= Super XIII 2024–2025 =

European rugby league competition

Super XIII 2024-25
- League: Super XIII
- Duration: 22 rounds + playoffs
- Teams: 11

2024–25 season
- Champions: Albi RL
- League leaders: Albi RL

The 2024–25 Super XIII season was the 90th season of France's domestic rugby league competition and the first as the Super XIII having previously been known as the Elite 1 Championship since 2002.

In March 2024, the French Rugby League Federation confirmed its plans to expand the top division to eleven teams in 2024–25, therefore there was no relegation from Elite 1 at the end of the 2023–24 season and the ten teams from Elite 1 were joined by Villefranche XIII Aveyron from Elite 2. The eleven teams in the competition each played 20 matches in the regular season. The top six teams then progressed to the finals series played in May 2025. The defending champions were Carcassonne who defeated Albi in the 2023–24 Grand Final to become national champions for a thirteenth time. The two teams met again in the 2024–25 final with Albi winning 26–16 to secure the first top division title for the Albigensians since winning the French Championship in the 1976–77 season.

== Teams ==
Location of teams in the 2024–25 season

Team	Stadium	Location
Albi RL	Stade Mazicou	Albi, Tarn
SO Avignon	Parc des Sports (Avignon)	Avignon, Vaucluse
AS Carcassonne	Stade Albert Domec	Carcassonne, Aude
FC Lézignan	Stade du Moulin	Lézignan-Corbières, Aude
Limoux Grizzlies	Stade de l'Aiguille	Limoux, Aude
Pia XIII	Stade Daniel-Ambert	Pia, Pyrénées-Orientales
Saint-Estève Catalan	Stade Municipal	Perpignan, Pyrénées-Orientales
Saint-Gaudens Bears	Stade Jules Ribet	Saint-Gaudens, Haute-Garonne
Toulouse Olympique Broncos	Stade des Minimes	Toulouse, Haute-Garonne
Villefranche XIII Aveyron	Stade Henri Lagarde	Villefranche-de-Rouergue, Aveyron
Villeneuve Leopards	Stade Max Rousie	Villeneuve-sur-Lot, Lot-et-Garonne

== Regular season ==
The regular season started on 21 September 2024 and ended on 30 April 2025. Each team played every other team twice, once at home and the other away making 20 games for each team and a total of 110 games over 22 rounds. It was originally scheduled to end on 27 April, but was extended due to two matches in the penultimate round being postponed.

=== Table and results ===
Pos	Team	Pld	W	D	L	PF	PA	PD	BP	Pts	Qualification	ALB	CAR	STE	PIA	LIM	VIL	VFA	LEZ	STG	AVI	TOU
1	Albi	20	16	0	4	554	292	+262	3	51	Semi-finals	—	58–16	16–20	26–10	28–20	26–12	22–14	38–18	38–6	30–16	30–12
2	Carcassonne	20	14	0	6	643	361	+282	5	47	Semi-finals	8–18	—	32–12	8–6	22–23	34–12	52–6	35–12	40–16	46–16	56–14
3	Saint-Estève Catalan	20	13	0	7	484	414	+70	4	43 (Note: Points differences for matches between teams level on points: Saint-Estève Catalan: +4 (92–88), Pia: +1 (79–78), Limoux: -5 (101–106))	Qualifiers	20–14	20–40	—	6–13	26–16	20–14 (Note: Played 7 December: postponed from 26 October as venue being used for a France–Wales international.)	22–14	30–22	38–24	24–28	44–4
4	Pia	20	12	0	8	547	335	+212	7	43	Qualifiers	38–20 (Note: Played on 17 November: match on 22 September was abandoned at half-time (Albi leading 10–6) as pitch was unplayable.)	26–24	22–24	—	26–18	22–10	50–24	36–18	54–12	28–10	76–0
5	Limoux	20	12	0	8	491	412	+79	7	43	Qualifiers	8–10	16–46	37–36	30–18	—	18–6	24–34	36–4	42–26 (Note: Played on 30 April: match on 19 April was abandoned after 20 minutes (Limoux leading 10–0) due to severe weather conditions.)	34–0	24–16
6	Villeneuve	20	10	0	10	404	382	+22	7	37	Qualifiers	6–16	38–18	28–24	6–4	14–28	—	48–6	22–28	40–16	26–18	32–12
7	Villefranche	20	10	0	10	410	506	−96	4	34		6–22	20–12	18–22	27–26	22–16	30–22	—	21–16	16–12	48–18	36–12
8	Lézignan	20	8	0	12	406	470	−64	7	31		18–16	12–38	28–12	16–26	14–20	18–20	34–14	—	35–18	20–18	36–10
9	Saint-Gaudens	20	8	0	12	480	546	−66	4	28 (Note: In October, Saint-Gaudens were fined and deducted 3 points after a member of the club was reported for using racist insults. The points were reinstated on appeal.)		22–36	20–24	16–20	18–14	26–22	16–18	46–22	20–17	—	38–18	28–10
10	Avignon	20	7	0	13	354	566	−212	4	25		4–30	24–32	18–34	28–22	26–34	12–6	22–12	22–18	18–58	—	20–18
11	Toulouse	20	0	0	20	232	721	−489	5	5		18–60	0–60	10–30	10–30	12–25	16–32	8–20	18–22	24–42	8–18	—

Notes:
- 3 points for a victory
- 1 point bonus for the losing team if the margin is less than 12
- If two teams have equal points then the separation factor is the point difference in head-to-head matches between the specific teams. If a team has a greater point difference they rank higher on the table. If still tied then overall points difference will be the tie-breaker.

== Finals ==
At the end of the regular season, the top six teams in the table advanced to the knockout stage. First and second received byes to the semi-finals where they faced the winners of the qualifying finals. Three teams finished the season on 43 points and despite having the inferior overall points difference Saint-Estève Catalan were seeded highest based on the outcome of matches between the three teams. They faced sixth-placed Villeneuve who defeated them 34–12 to advance to the semi-finals. In the other match Limoux won 24–22 at Pia. The semi-finals went to the higher seeded teams with Albi winning 26–8 over Limoux and Carcassonne defeating Villeneuve 11–6 to set up a repeat of the 2024–25 final. The Grand Final was played on 25 May 2025 at Parc des Sports et de l'Amitié in Narbonne. Albi, who had last won the national title in the 1976–77 season, defeated the defending champions 26–16 with two tries in the last five minutes to the lift the Max Rousiè Shield for the first time in 48 years.

=== Bracket ===
Qualifying Finals
4	Pia	22
5	Limoux	24
3	Saint-Estève Catalan	12
6	Villeneuve	34

Semi-Finals
1	Albi	26
5	Limoux	8
2	Carcassonne	11
6	Villeneuve	6

Final
1	Albi	26
2	Carcassonne	16

=== Grand Final ===
Sunday, 25 May 2025
16:30

Albi	26–16	Carcassonne
Tries: Rostang 32'; Budden 35'; Pedrero 60'; Tailhades 77'; Le Cam 79'; Goals: Gigit 32', 77', 79'		Tries: Gambaro 17'; Rogers-Smith 20'; Escaré 46'; Goals: Herrero 20', 46'

Parc des Sports et de l'Amitié, Narbonne
Attendance: 5,191
Referee: Stéphane Vincent
