= Elite One Championship 2023–2024 =

European rugby league competition

Elite One Championship 2023-24
- League: Elite One Championship
- Duration: 18 rounds + playoffs
- Teams: 10

2023–24 season
- Champions: AS Carcassonne
- League leaders: AS Carcassonne

The 2023–24 Elite One Championship was the 89th season of France's domestic rugby league competition and the 23rd season known as the Elite 1 championship.

The league had the same ten teams as the 2022–23 season with Villeneuve, who finished in last place, retaining their Elite 1 status and Ille declining promotion from Elite 2. The ten teams in the competition each played 18 matches in the regular season. The top six teams progressed to final series played in May 2024. The defending champions were Limoux who had defeated Carcassonne in the 2022–23 Grand Final. Carcassonne reached the Grand Final again in 2023–24 and defeated Albi 8–6 to become champions of France for a thirteenth time. They also achieved a league-cup double having won the Coupe de France Lord Derby earlier in the season. In March 2024, the French Rugby League Federation confirmed its plans to expand the top division to eleven teams in 2024–25, therefore there was no relegation from Elite 1 at the end of the 2023–24 season.

== Teams ==
Location of teams in 2023-24 season

Team	Stadium	Location
Albi RL	Stadium Mazicou	Albi, Tarn
SO Avignon	Parc des Sports (Avignon)	Avignon, Vaucluse
AS Carcassonne	Stade Albert Domec	Carcassonne, Aude
FC Lézignan	Stade du Moulin	Lézignan-Corbières, Aude
Limoux Grizzlies	Stade de l'Aiguille	Limoux, Aude
Pia Donkeys	Stade Daniel-Ambert	Pia, Pyrénées-Orientales
Saint-Estève Catalan	Stade Municipal	Perpignan, Pyrénées-Orientales
Saint-Gaudens Bears	Stade Jules Ribet	Saint-Gaudens, Haute-Garonne
Toulouse Olympique Broncos	Stade des Minimes	Toulouse, Haute-Garonne
Villeneuve Leopards	Stade Max Rousie	Villeneuve-sur-Lot, Lot-et-Garonne

== Regular season ==
The regular season started on 30 September 2023 and ended on 14 April 2024. Each team was scheduled to play every other team twice, once at home and the other away making 18 games for each team and a total of 90 games.

=== Table and results ===
Pos	Team	Pld	W	L	PF	PA	PD	BP	Pts	Qualification	CAR	ALB	LIM	PIA	LEZ	STE	AVI	STG	VIL	TOU
1	Carcassonne	18	16	2	636	296	+340	2	50	Semi-finals	—	30–32	28–8	38–16	38–20	30–12	36–12	52–16	58–6	50–28
2	Albi	18	15	3	515	238	+277	2	47	Semi-finals	20–14	—	4–0	16–0	18–10	36–10	44–12	50–6	40–4	42–18
3	Limoux	18	11	7	418	268	+150	4	37	Qualifiers	22–40	6–14	—	10–18	10–30	30–14	28–16	32–4	42–4	34–12
4	Pia	18	12	6	412	369	+43	1	37	Qualifiers	12–31	20–12	12–20	—	26–0	28–18	42–16	30–24	48–22	28–0
5	Lézignan	18	10	8	448	360	+88	5	35	Qualifiers	10–16	26–24	4–30	26–10	—	14–19	70–6	48–16	32–24	44–8
6	Saint-Estève Catalan	18	10	8	472	382	+90	3	33	Qualifiers	20–26	10–49	6–26	54–10	25–24	—	50–22	30–22	52–2	22–12
7	Avignon	18	7	11	378	539	−161	5	26		28–46	12–24	18–12	24–26	28–34	25–24	—	24–14	28–13	16–24
8	Saint-Gaudens	18	4	14	384	574	−190	7	19		16–36	46–24	18–34	14–26	20–10	10–28	28–39	—	22–18	28–40
9	Villeneuve	18	2	16	289	541	−252	8	14		12–13	4–14	12–20	20–34	22–24	12–24	14–28	37–36	—	25–10
10	Toulouse Olympique	18	3	15	258	643	−385	3	12		6–54	10–52	14–54	24–26	20–22	4–54	10–24	16–44	24–16	—

- 3 points for a victory
- 1 point bonus for the losing team if the margin is less than 12
- If two teams have equal points then the separation factor is the point difference in head-to-head matches between the specific teams. If a team has a greater point difference they rank higher on the table. If still tied then overall points difference will be the tie-breaker.

== Finals ==
At the end of the regular season, the top six teams in the table advanced to the knockout stage. First and second received a bye to the semi-finals where they faced the winners of the qualifying finals. The semi-finals were originally scheduled to be held at the neutral venue of Stade Michel Bendichou, Colomiers, but when the venue became unavailable due to the 2024 Summer Olympics torch relay the matches were moved to the home grounds of the highest seeded teams. The winners of the semi-finals played in the Grand Final on 26 May at Parc des Sports et de l'Amitié in Narbonne. In the Grand Final, Carcassonne, who had won the Lord Derby Cup in April, faced Albi, the only side to have beaten them in the regular season. In a low scoring match Carcassonne led 4–0 at half time. A converted try midway through the second half put Albi ahead 4–6 before Carcassonne regained the lead with a try three minutes from the end to win 8–6.

=== Bracket ===
Qualifying Finals
4	Pia	22
5	Lézignan	16
3	Limoux	44
6	Saint-Estève Catalan	10

Semi-Finals
1	Carcassonne	44
4	Pia	4
2	Albi	34
3	Limoux	18

Final
1	Carcassonne	8
2	Albi	6

=== Grand Final ===
26 May 2024
16:00

Carcassonne	8 – 6	Albi
Tries: Serelevu; Goals: Herrero (2)		Tries: Dupuy; Goals: Hellec

Parc des Sports et de l'Amitié, Narbonne
Attendance: 5,578
Referee: Geoffrey Poumes
