= 1938–39 French Rugby League Cup =

Fifth edition of the Coupe de France Lord Derby

1938–39 Coupe de France Lord Derby
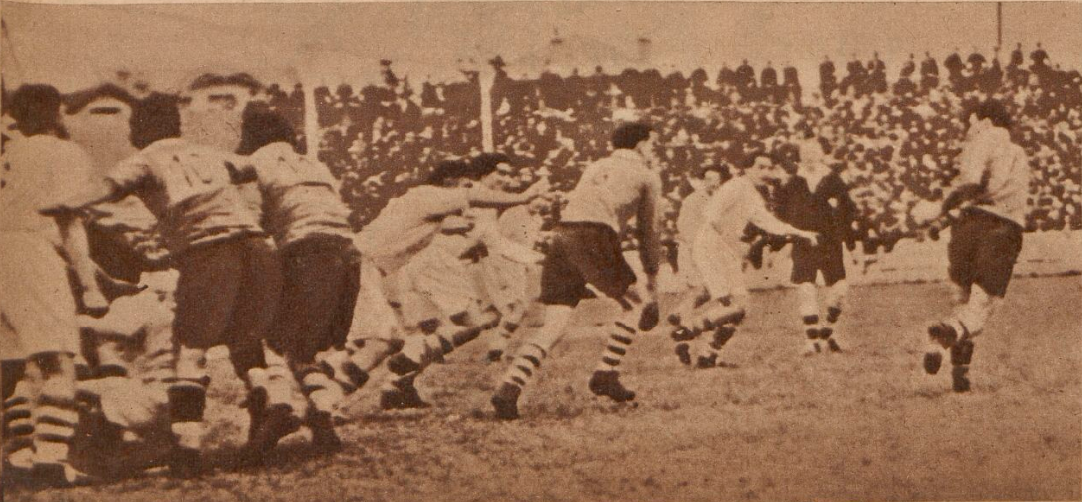
- XIII Catalan and Toulouse Olympique in the final
- Duration: 12 March – 21 May 1939
- Number of teams: 15
- Champions: XIII Catalan
- Runners-up: Toulouse Olympique XIII

The 1938–39 Coupe de France Lord Derby was the fifth edition of the Coupe de France Lord Derby, France's knockout rugby league cup competition. Organised by the Ligue française de rugby à XIII (French Rugby League), it brought together 15 clubs. XIII Catalan, based in Perpignan, won the competition by defeating Toulouse Olympique XIII at Stade Chapou in Toulouse. XIII Catalan were the last winners before the Second World War: the 1940 competition was not completed, and the Vichy regime subsequently banned rugby league in France.

The 1939 competition featured the thirteen clubs from the French first division, together with two amateur clubs, Courbevoie and Saint-Gaudens, which had emerged from a lengthy qualifying competition. The fifteen entrants joined the tournament at the round of 16, with the exception of defending champions RC Roanne, who received a bye into the quarter-finals following the withdrawal of Dax XIII for the season.

== Participating teams ==
AS Carcassonne, CA Brive, RC Narbonne and SU Cavaillon appeared in the competition for the first time. These four clubs had previously been affiliated with the French rugby union federation and joined the French Rugby League at the beginning of the 1938–39 season. The two amateur sides, Courbevoie and Saint-Gaudens, also made their first appearances.

First Division clubs (13)	Amateur clubs (2)
Enter in the round of 16	Enter in the round of 16
SA Villeneuve	Courbevoie
AS Carcassonne	Saint-Gaudens
Bordeaux XIII	
XIII Catalan	
Toulouse olympique XIII	
RC Albigeois	
US Lyon-Villeurbanne	
Côte basque XIII	
SU Cavaillon	
CA Brive	
RC Narbonne	
Pau XIII	
Enter in the quarter-finals	–
RC Roanne	

=== Results by round ===
Round of 16; 12 March 1939
Perpignan
XIII Catalan	25
CA Brive	10
Albi
SA Villeneuve	22
RC Narbonne	12
Bordeaux
Bordeaux XIII	30
Courbevoie	13
Narbonne
RC Albigeois	5 (Note: This was the result of the replay. The original match ended in an 8–8 draw. As extra time was not played, the match was replayed the following week, with Albi winning 5–0.)
US Lyon-Villeurbanne	0
Narbonne
Toulouse olympique XIII	15
SU Cavaillon	7
Bye
RC Roanne (Note: Only fifteen clubs took part in the competition following the withdrawal of Dax XIII from the 1938–39 season. As a result, Roanne, the league leaders at the time of the draw, received a bye into the quarter-finals.)
Arcachon
Côte Basque XIII	24
Pau XIII	8
Carcassonne
AS Carcassonne	40
Saint-Gaudens	0

Quarter-finals; 2 April 1939
Carcassonne
XIII Catalan	16
SA Villeneuve	5
Toulouse
Bordeaux XIII	8
RC Albigeois	3
Bordeaux
Toulouse olympique XIII	15
RC Roanne	3
Albi
Côte Basque XIII	22
AS Carcassonne	3

Semi-finals; 7 May 1939
Carcassonne
XIII Catalan	12
Bordeaux XIII	7
Bordeaux
Toulouse olympique XIII	20
Côte Basque XIII	15

Final; 21 May 1939
Toulouse
XIII Catalan	7
Toulouse olympique XIII	3

RC Roanne, the defending champions, received a bye into the quarter-finals because Dax XIII had withdrawn from the 1938–39 season. The exemption was awarded to the side leading the league table at the time of the draw. (Note: The French source explains that the cup had only fifteen entrants following Dax XIII's withdrawal and that the team at the top of the French championship at the time of the draw was exempted from the round of 16.)

=== Round of 16 ===
Round of 16 results
Matches	Score
Bordeaux def. Courbevoie	30–13
Carcassonne def. Saint-Gaudens	40–0
Toulouse def. Cavaillon	15–7
Villeneuve def. Narbonne	22–12
Côte Basque def. Pau	24–8
XIII Catalan def. Brive	25–10
Albi def. Lyon	5–0

The round of 16, the opening round of this edition of the Coupe de France, took place on 12 March 1939. As holders of the trophy, RC Roanne were exempt from this opening round, contested by fourteen teams. The fixtures produced no major upsets and generally followed pre-match expectations. The meeting between US Lyon-Villeurbanne and RC Albigeois, two teams of similar standing, was the only closely contested tie. An 8–8 draw forced the teams to meet again to determine the winner. Courbevoie's amateurs, led by Roger Claudel, forced the professionals of Bordeaux XIII to take their match seriously, as did Saint-Gaudens against AS Carcassonne. The principal incidents were disciplinary, including the dismissals of Joseph Carrère of Narbonne and Sylvain Bès of Toulouse.

=== Quarter-finals ===
The quarter-finals were held on Sunday, 2 April 1939.

==== XIII Catalan 16–5 SA Villeneuve ====
2 April 1939

XIII Catalan	16–5	SA Villeneuve
Tries: 4 Queroli, Bosc, Danoy, Fabre; Goals: 2 Bosc (2 conversions)	1st: 10–5	Tries: 1 Lacaze; Goals: 1 Puyuelo (penalty)

Carcassonne, France

The clubs had met in the league the previous weekend, when SA Villeneuve had won. XIII Catalan nevertheless entered the cup tie as favourites, owing to their experience in knockout matches. From the kick-off, the Catalans established themselves in Villeneuve's half and dominated territory. They built a 10–5 half-time lead, with tries from Jean Queroli and Émile Bosc in reply to André Lacaze's try for Villeneuve. In the second half, the Catalans scored two further tries through Ferdinand Danoy and Fabre, the latter following an individual break by François Rivière. The Catalan forwards, led by André Gau, stifled Villeneuve's attacking ambitions. Étienne Cougnenc, Maurice Brunetaud and Pierre Brinsolles were unable to gain the upper hand or create openings.

==== Bordeaux XIII 8–3 RC Albigeois ====
2 April 1939

Bordeaux XIII	8–3	RC Albigeois
Tries: 2 Labrousse, Cazaux; Goals: 1 Desclaux (conversion); Sent off: Larroche	1st: 5–3	Tries: 1 Barran; Sent off: Gimenez, Claverie

Stade des Minimes, Toulouse, France

At a rain-soaked Stade des Minimes in Toulouse, Bordeaux XIII, led by Raoul Bonamy and Joseph Desclaux, were favoured to defeat RC Albigeois. Although the reigning French champions, Albi had not enjoyed the same success that season, despite possessing a more complete forward pack than Bordeaux. Bordeaux began by building a defensive wall and waiting for an opportunity to counter-attack. Albi took the initiative and pressed into Bordeaux territory, but Labrousse scored on the counter-attack and Desclaux converted. Bordeaux resisted strongly after that opening try, giving Albi little reason to believe they could overturn the result. Robert Barran replied with an unconverted try, leaving Bordeaux 5–3 ahead at half-time. After the interval, Albi again pushed Bordeaux back towards their own line, but the intensity of their play led to the dismissals of Gimenez and Claverie. Bordeaux then exploited their numerical advantage, with Cazaux scoring a second try to complete an 8–3 victory. Desclaux was regarded as the outstanding player on the field.

==== Toulouse Olympique 15–3 RC Roanne ====
2 April 1939
16:00

Toulouse Olympique XIII	15–3	RC Roanne
Tries: 3 Saris, Bès; Goals: 2 Chevallier (2 conversions)	1st: 10–0	Tries: 1 Henri Gibert

Bordeaux, France
Attendance: 10,000

In Bordeaux, Toulouse Olympique fielded one of the most formidable forward packs in France. RC Roanne, the holders and league leaders, hoped that their attacking players would carry them to victory. The match was above all a forward battle, marked by confrontations and disrupted passages of play. Roanne fullback Gabriel Clément made a poor start, and Toulouse capitalised by scoring two tries within the opening fifteen minutes. Once ahead, Toulouse relied on their forwards to contain and neutralise Roanne's attacks. Roanne never seriously threatened to close the gap created early in the game. Toulouse's fullback Marcel Teychenné and scrum-half Sylvain Bès were particularly prominent.

==== Côte Basque XIII 22–3 AS Carcassonne ====
2 April 1939

Côte Basque XIII	22–3	AS Carcassonne
Tries: 4 Cussac, Audurau, Puchulu, Sanz; Goals: 4 Audurau (3 conversions, 1 penalty); Drop goals: 1 Audurau	1st: 7–0	Tries: 1 Fabre

Albi, France
Referee: Barbé

Côte Basque had demonstrated their ability in cup competition despite inconsistent league results, having won the trophy in 1936 and reached the semi-finals in 1938. They had repeatedly raised their performance level in cup ties, and the match at Albi was therefore expected to be evenly contested. Carcassonne enjoyed superiority in the scrums throughout the encounter but failed to develop an effective passing game. Côte Basque gradually built their victory through the kicking of Henri Audurau and the quality of their handling, which produced four tries. Carcassonne managed only one try and suffered a heavy 22–3 defeat.

=== Semi-finals ===
The semi-finals took place on Sunday, 7 May 1939, one week after the semi-finals of the French championship.

==== XIII Catalan 12–7 Bordeaux XIII ====
7 May 1939

XIII Catalan	12–7	Bordeaux XIII
Tries: 2 Penalty try, Rivière; Goals: 3 Bosc (2 conversions, 1 penalty)	1st: 2–2	Tries: 1 Dehès; Goals: 2 Desclaux (1 conversion, 1 penalty)

Stade de la Pépinière, Carcassonne, France
Referee: Peels

The first semi-final brought together two teams that had competed for fourth place in the French championship, a position ultimately secured by Bordeaux. Bordeaux were the only side to have reached the semi-finals of both major French competitions. However, after a demanding match against RC Roanne the preceding weekend, they appeared fatigued ahead of their meeting with XIII Catalan. The tie was played at the neutral venue of Carcassonne. Bordeaux had eliminated the amateurs of Courbevoie and RC Albigeois; XIII Catalan had beaten the rugby league newcomers CA Brive and then SA Villeneuve.

Bordeaux were missing several players, notably hooker André Saubion, fullback François Nouel and winger Cyprien Estoueigt. In dreadful weather conditions, neither side was able to produce high-quality play, and the teams were level at 2–2 at half-time. The Catalans eventually gained the upper hand through the strength of their forward pack, scoring two tries, one of them a penalty try. Fullback François Noguères also made an important contribution as a driving force in attack. Bordeaux struggled against the power of the Catalan forwards and, unable to reverse the course of the game, lost 12–7.

==== Toulouse Olympique 20–15 Côte Basque XIII ====
7 May 1939

Toulouse Olympique XIII	20–15	Côte Basque XIII
Tries: 4 Sahuc, Duprat, Brané, Saris; Goals: 3 Bès (1 penalty), Chevallier (2 penalties); Drop goals: 1 Labat; Sent off: Sabatié (10')	1st: 4–10	Tries: 3 Lacourt, Sanz, Puchulu; Goals: 3 Audurau (3 conversions)

Bordeaux, France

The second semi-final opposed two teams that had failed to qualify for the championship semi-finals, having fallen behind the leading teams earlier in the season. Both relied heavily on their forwards and had made the Coupe de France their main objective at the end of the campaign. The game was held at a neutral venue in Bordeaux. Toulouse Olympique had eliminated SU Cavaillon and the strongly favoured RC Roanne, while Côte Basque had overcome Pau XIII and AS Carcassonne.

The match on 7 May 1939 was disjointed overall. Toulouse were reduced to twelve men early on by the dismissal of Sabatier, but Côte Basque were unable to exploit their numerical advantage against a solid defence. Toulouse also drew on individual skill to turn the score around after trailing by six points. Their outstanding player was fullback Marcel Teychenné, supported by scrum-half Sylvain Bès and his kicking. For Côte Basque, the forwards performed reasonably well, particularly Antoine Blain, but only David Zabaleta, assisted by Henri Audurau and Laclédère, provided a sustained attacking threat. Côte Basque led 10–4 at the interval. After the restart, a try by André Duprat put Toulouse ahead. They retained that advantage, with Raphaël Saris extending the score to 20–10 before a late try by Puchulu reduced the deficit.

=== Final – 21 May 1939 ===
1938–39 Coupe de France Lord Derby final

21 May 1939

XIII Catalan	7–3	Toulouse Olympique XIII
Tries: 1 Bosc; Goals: 2 Noguères (pen 38', pen 50')	1st: 2–3	Tries: 1 Bès (35')

Stade Chapou, Toulouse, France
Attendance: ≈18,000
Referee: Wally Webb (England)

Score progression: 0–3, 2–3 (half-time), 4–3, 7–3.

Gate receipts: 135,000 French francs.

Team lists:

FB	1	François Noguères
WG	2	Joseph Ollet
CE	3	Raoul Lavagne
CE	4	Émile Bosc
WG	5	Jep Maso
FE	6	Augustin Saltraille
HB	7	Roger Vaills
PR	8	André Bruzy
HK	9	Jean Queroli
PR	10	François Forma
SR	11	Molins
SR	12	Ferdinand Danoy
LK	13	François Rivière
Coach:
Roger Ramis

FB	1	Marcel Teychenné
WG	2	Georges Bentouré
CE	3	André Duprat
CE	4	Frantz Sahuc
WG	5	Raphaël Saris
FE	6	Jean Labat
HB	7	Sylvain Bès
PR	8	Jean Avignon
HK	9	Georges Chevallier
PR	10	Germain Tournier
SR	11	Alexandre Salat
SR	12	Jean Londaitsbéhère
LK	13	René Barthère
Coach:
Not recorded

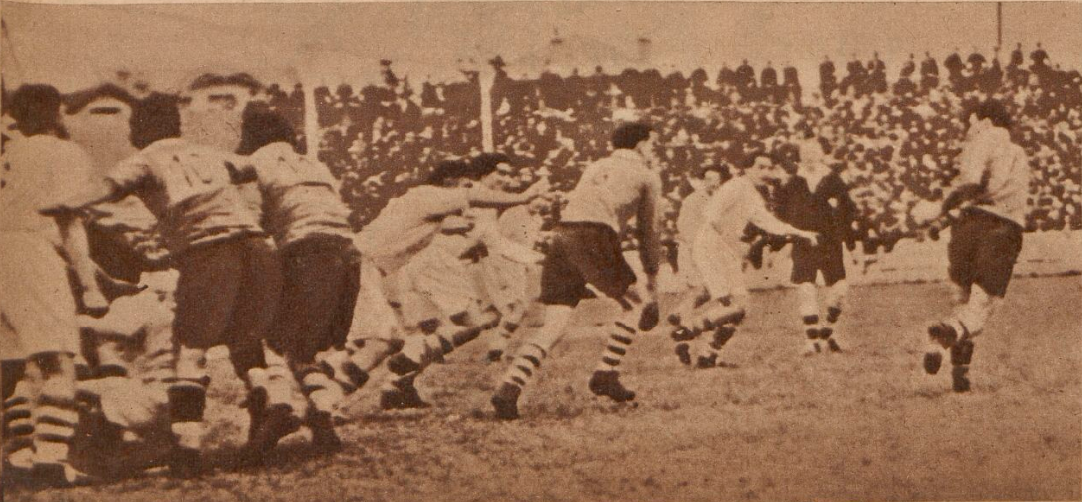
At Stade Chapou in Toulouse, XIII Catalan defeated Toulouse Olympique 7–3 in the Coupe de France final. Sylvain Bès initiated the attacking move from the scrum that led to Toulouse's only try of the match.

Toulouse Olympique reached their first Coupe de France final, played in their home city at Stade Chapou, the usual ground of the Toulouse OEC rugby union club. The stadium hosted rugby league for the first time following an agreement between the French Rugby League and the stadium's owner, Mr Mortera, with the help of two rugby union officials, Albert Ginesty and Jean Delbert. This was seen as a sign that the rivalry between the two rugby codes in Toulouse had come to an end. XIII Catalan were appearing in their third Coupe de France final, having eliminated Brive, Villeneuve-sur-Lot and Bordeaux along the way. Toulouse, meanwhile, had beaten Cavaillon, Roanne and Côte Basque. Neither finalist had qualified for the French championship semi-finals: they finished fifth and sixth respectively, level on points.

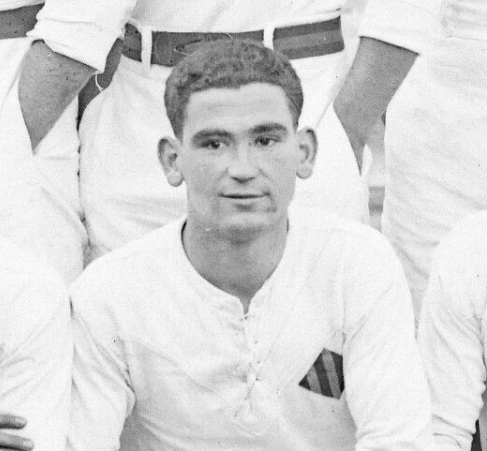
XIII Catalan fullback François Noguères was regarded as the outstanding player in the final.

Toulouse were without several players, including Louis Brané, a French international and regular member of their forward pack, who was prevented from taking part by his new employer. A cook by profession, Brané had accepted a job at a restaurant connected with the Brussels international exhibition. He had obtained permission to delay his start date to play in the semi-final, but his employer refused a further extension for the final. Toulouse were also missing Sabatier, who was suspended, and Adrien Maurel, who was ill, leaving three regular forwards unavailable. XIII Catalan, for their part, were without Fabre, the suspended Maurice Porra, and André Gau.

The final was therefore a meeting of two evenly matched teams. Toulouse and their forwards had the better of the first half, leading 3–2 at the interval thanks to a 35th-minute try by Sylvain Bès. From the scrum, Bès moved the ball to Labat, who combined with Frantz Sahuc before Bès finished the move. The try was not converted. François Noguères responded almost immediately with a penalty goal for the Catalans. Toulouse had clearly dominated the opening period, winning ample possession from scrums and playing expansively, frequently using tactical kicks. However, their stand-off Jean Labat left the field permanently with a knee injury before half-time. Toulouse were left to regret missed scoring opportunities, caused by poor ball use among the three-quarters and resolute Catalan defence, and led by only 3–2 at the break.

After the interval, Toulouse had to continue with twelve players. Noguères, who was particularly effective at countering Toulouse's overused attacking kicks, became the decisive figure. He kicked a second penalty goal in the 50th minute, then made a long counter-attacking run, using changes of direction to create the opportunity for Émile Bosc to score XIII Catalan's only try. XIII Catalan secured their first Coupe de France title with a 7–3 victory.

In the curtain-raiser, Villeneuve's juniors won the junior title by defeating Toulouse's juniors 29–17.

== See also ==
- Coupe de France Lord Derby
- 1938–39 French Rugby League Championship

== Bibliography ==
- Passamar, André (1984). L'Encyclopédie de Treize Magazine (in French). Toulouse: Treize Magazine. p. 168. OCLC 461737232.
- Bonnery, Louis (1996). Le rugby à XIII : le plus français du monde (in French). Cano & Frank. OCLC 45029080.
- Denis Arcas (2019). Rugby à XIII : Il était une fois ... Le rugby de Liberté (in French). Saint-Ouen: Les Éditions du Net. ISBN 9782312065854.
