= Lord Derby Cup 2025–2026 =

French rugby league football competition

2025–26 Lord Derby French Cup
- Duration: 20 December 2025 – 11 April 2026
- Number of teams: 15
- Broadcast partners: Youtube
- Winners: AS Carcassonne (18th title)
- Runners-up: Albi RL XIII

The 2025–26 Coupe de France Lord Derby was the 85th edition of the Coupe de France Lord Derby, the premier rugby league knockout competition in France. It began over the weekend of 20–21 December 2025 and concluded with the final on 11 April 2026.

The defending champions were Saint-Estève XIII Catalan who defeated Albi RL XIII in the 2024–25 final. In the 2025–26 final, AS Carcassonne defeated Albi 44–6 to win the trophy for the 18th time.

== Background ==
The 85th edition of the Coupe de France Lord Derby, started on 20 December 2025 and concluded with the final on 11 April 2026. Entry was limited to teams in the top two divisions: Super XIII (11 teams) and Elite 2 (4 of the 9 teams). The defending champions, Saint-Estève XIII Catalan, received a bye in the first round, and advanced to the quarter-finals were they were joined by the winning teams from the play-off round. The Elite 2 teams competing in the Lord Derby Cup were given an exemption from the draw for the play-off round of the Challenge Georges Aillères (the Elite 2 league cup).

=== Format and dates ===
Lord Derby French Cup competition format
| Round | Date | Clubs involved this round | Winners from previous round | New entries this round | Leagues entering at this round |
|---|---|---|---|---|---|
| Play-off round | 20–21 December | 14 | None | 14 | 10 teams from Super XIII and 4 teams from Elite 2 |
| Quarter-finals | 10–11 January | 8 | 7 | 1 | 1 team from Super XIII |
| Semi-finals | 7–8 March | 4 | 4 | None | |
| Final | 11 April | 2 | 2 | None | |

== Play-off round ==
The draws for the play-off round and the quarter-finals were made on 25 October. Ties were played over the weekend of 20–21 December.

Play-off round fixtures
| Home | Score | Away | Match Information | | |
| Home | Score | Away | Date and Time | Venue | Report |
|---|---|---|---|---|---|
| FC Lézignan XIII | 26–0 | Saint-Gaudens Bears | 20 December | Stade Du Moulin | Report |
| Villeneuve XIII RLLG | 18–19 | SO Avignon | 20 December | Stade de La Myre Mory | Report |
| Tonneins XIII | 6–52 | Baroudeurs de Pia XIII | 21 December | Stade Jean Bernege | Report |
| Pamiers XIII | 12–90 | AS Carcassonne | 21 December | Complexe Balussou | Report |
| Albi RL XIII | 42–0 | Toulouse Olympique Elite | 20 December | Stade Mazicou | Report |
| Villegailhenc-Aragon XIII | 30–16 | Ille-sur-Têt XIII | 21 December | Stade Jerome Rieu | Report |
| Villefranche XIII Aveyron | 16–28 | XIII Limouxin | 20 December | Stade Henri Lagarde | Report |

== Quarter-finals ==
Ties were played on the weekend of 10–11 January.

Quarter-final fixtures
| Home | Score | Away | Match Information | | |
| Home | Score | Away | Date and Time | Venue | Report |
|---|---|---|---|---|---|
| AS Carcassonne | 12–9 | XIII Limouxin | 10 January | Stade Albert Domec | Report |
| FC Lézignan XIII | 24–20 | Saint-Estève XIII Catalan | 11 January | Stade Du Moulin | Report |
| Baroudeurs de Pia XIII | 12–36 | Albi RL XIII | 11 January | Stade Jerome Rieu | Report |
| Villegailhenc-Aragon XIII | 30–18 | SO Avignon | 11 January | Stade Daniel Ambert | Report |

== Semi-finals ==
The draw for the semi-finals was made on 20 January. Ties were played on the weekend of 7–8 March at neutral venues.

Semi-final fixtures
| Home | Score | Away | Match Information | | |
| Home | Score | Away | Date and Time | Venue | Report |
|---|---|---|---|---|---|
| FC Lézignan XIII | 24–42 | AS Carcassonne | 7 March, 15:00 | Stade Arnauné, Toulouse | Report |
| Albi RL XIII | 22–2 | Villegailhenc-Aragon XIII | 8 March, 16:30 | Stade de la Chevalière, Mazamet | Report |

== Final ==
The final of the 2025–26 Coupe de France Lord Derby was originally scheduled to take place on the weekend of 18–19 April. However, in February 2026, it was announced that it had been brought forward to the weekend of 11–12 April and would be played at the Stade Gilbert Brutus, Perpignan.

Albi, the losing finalists in the 2024–25 competition, had previously only won the cup once, in the 1973–74 season. Carcassonne made their most recent final appearance in the 2023–24 competition when they won the title for a seventeenth time. In the 2025–26 final, AS Carcassonne led 16–6 at half time, and went on to win the match 44–6. The attendance for the final was approximately 3,500. Before the Lord Derby match, Albi defeated Toulouse Olympique 22–16 in the final of the Luc Nitard cup.

Final
| Home | Score | Away | Match Information | | | |
| Home | Score | Away | Date and Time | Venue | Referee | Report |
|---|---|---|---|---|---|---|
| AS Carcassonne | 44–6 | Albi RL XIII | 11 April | Stade Gilbert Brutus, Perpignan | Stéphane Vincent | Report |

=== Teams ===
AS Carcassonne: Morgan Escaré, Alexis Escamilla, Vincent Albert, Maika Serulevu, Georgy Gambaro, Clement Herrero, Lucas Albert, Clément Boyer, Nolan Lopez Buttignol, Thomas Malfaz, Paul Séguier, Edenn Rogers-Smith, Bastien Escamilla
Substitutes:Jowasa Drodrolagi, Djibryl Dauliac, Bastien Canet and Alexis Alberola

Albi RL XIII: Baptiste Fabre, Robin Brochon, Maia Sands, Clément Tailhades, Fouad Yaha, Ilan Boualem, Brad Wall, Chase Bernard, Thibault Correges, Dominique Peyroux, Corentin Le Cam, Tristan Dupuy, John Toleafoa
Substitutes: Louis Tailhades, Maxime Puech, Mathieu Liauzun, Jayson Goffin
