= Lord Derby Cup 2023–2024 =

French rugby league football competition

2023–24 Lord Derby French Cup
- Duration: 16 December 2023 – 27 April 2024
- Number of teams: 19
- Broadcast partners: Youtube
- Winners: AS Carcassonne (17th title)
- Runners-up: FC Lézignan XIII

The 2023–24 Coupe de France Lord Derby was the 83rd edition of the Coupe de France Lord Derby, the premier rugby league knockout competition in France. It began over the weekend of 16–17 December 2023 and ended with the final at the Stade Gilbert Brutus on 27 April 2024.

The defending champions were AS Carcassonne who defeated Albi RL XIII in the 2022–23 final to win the cup for the 16th time. In the 2023–24 competition, they retained the title by winning 22–6 against FC Lézignan XIII in the final.

== Background ==
The 83rd edition of the Coupe de France Lord Derby, started on 16 December 2023 and concluded with the final on 27 April 2024. Entry was limited to teams in the top two divisions, Elite 1 (10 teams) and Elite 2 (9 teams). Six teams from Elite 2 took part in a play-off round and the three winners advanced to the round of 16 where they were joined by the 13 teams who entered the competition at this stage.

=== Format and dates ===
Lord Derby French Cup competition format
Round	Date	Clubs involved this round	Winners from previous round	New entries this round	Leagues entering at this round
Play-off round	16–17 December	6	None	6	6 teams from Elite 2
Round of 16	6–7 January	16	3	13	3 teams from Elite 2 and all 10 teams from Elite 1
Quarter-finals	9–10 March	8	8	None	
Semi-finals	7 April	4	4	None	
Final	27 April	2	2	None	

== Play-off round ==
On 29 October 2023, the draws for the play-off round and the round of 16 were made in Carcassonne. Ties were played over the weekend of 16–17 December.

Round 1 fixtures
Home	Score	Away	Match Information			
Home	Score	Away	Date and Time	Venue	Referee	Report
Villefranche XIII Aveyron	52–4	RC Carpentras XIII	16 December, 15:00	Stade Henri Lagarde	M. Vincent	Report
Palau XIII Broncos	12–32	Villegailhenc-Aragon XIII	17 December, 15:00	Stade Georges Vaills	M. Crespo	Report
Ille-sur-Têt XIII	64–10	Tonneins XIII	17 December, 15:00	Stade Jean Galia	Mickaël Lannes	Report

== Round of 16 ==
Ties were played over the weekend of 6–7 January.

Round 2 fixtures
Home	Score	Away	Match Information			
Home	Score	Away	Date and Time	Venue	Referee	Report
US Entraigues XIII	6–54	XIII Limouxin	6 January, 15:00	Stade Georges Mauro		Report
Villegailhenc-Aragon XIII	18–34	Albi RL XIII	6 January, 15:00	Stade Jerome Rieux	M. Lannes	Report
RC Salon XIII	0–82	SO Avignon	7 January, 15:00	Stade Marcel Roustan		Report
Lescure-Arthes	14–16	Villeneuve XIII RLLG	7 January, 15:00	Stade Jean Vidal		Report
AS Carcassonne	52–0	Baroudeurs de Pia XIII	7 January, 15:00	Stade Albert Domec		Report
Toulouse Olympique Broncos	30–34	Saint-Estève XIII Catalan	7 January, 15:00	Stade des Minimes		Report
Villefranche XIII Aveyron	30–34	Saint-Gaudens Bears	7 January, 15:00	Stade Henri Lagarde	Fabien Nicaud	Report
Ille-sur-Têt XIII	0–24	FC Lézignan XIII	7 January, 15:00	Stade Jean Galia		Report

== Quarter-finals ==
The draw for the quarter-finals was made on 8 January. Ties were played on the weekend of 9–10 March.

Quarter-final fixtures
Home	Score	Away	Match Information			
Home	Score	Away	Date and Time	Venue	Referee	Report
FC Lézignan XIII	9–8	Albi RL XIII	9 March, 15:00	Stade du Moulin	M. Nicaud	Report
SO Avignon	16–8	Villeneuve XIII RLLG	9 March, 16:00	Parc des Sports Avignon	M. Drizza	Report
AS Carcassonne	48–0	Saint-Gaudens Bears	9 March, 18:00	Stade Albert Domec	M. Vincent	Report
Saint-Estève XIII Catalan	26–20	XIII Limouxin	10 March, 16:00	Stade Municipal Saint Esteve	Stéphane Vincent	Report

== Semi-finals ==
The draw for the semi-finals took place on 15 March. In September 2023, it was revealed that both semi-finals would be played in Marseille on the weekend of the 90th anniversary of the founding of the French Rugby League Federation.

Semi-final fixtures
Home	Score	Away	Match Information			
Home	Score	Away	Date and Time	Venue	Referee	Report
AS Carcassonne	32–20	Saint-Estève XIII Catalan	7 April, 14:00	Stade Delort, Marseille		Report
SO Avignon	48–0	FC Lézignan XIII	7 April, 16:30	Stade Delort, Marseille		Report

== Final ==
The final of the 2023–24 Coupe de France Lord Derby took place on 27 April at the Stade Gilbert Brutus, Perpignan. The match, which was the middle game of a triple header, was preceded by the women's final and followed by the Luc Nitard final (under-19s). The finals of the U15 and U17 categories were played at the Stade Daniel Ambert, Pia, earlier in the day. Defending champions, AS Carcassonne, had won the cup 16 times and were seeking a third consecutive title having won the cup in 2018–19 and 2022–23 (for three seasons no finals were held due to COVID). Their opponents, FC Lézignan, had previously won the cup in the 2014–5 season.

Final
Home	Score	Away	Match Information			
Home	Score	Away	Date and Time	Venue	Referee	Report
AS Carcassonne	22–6	FC Lézignan XIII	27 April, 15:00	Stade Gilbert Brutus, Perpignan	M. Drizza	Report

=== Teams ===
AS Carcassonne: Escaré, A. Escamilla (c), V. Albert, Franck, Gambaro, Herrero, L. Albert, Boyer, Artiga, Proctor, Serulevu, Bouregba, Canet
Interchanges: Dauliac, Malfaz, B. Escamilla, Drodrolagi
Head coach: Frédéric Camel

FC Lézignan: F. Flove, J. Flovie, Marty, Martin, Gouzy, Monteil, O'Beirne, Mason, Hack, Perramond, Brocas, Vasuturaga, Ors (c)
Interchanges: Cuellar, Albert, Mapapalangi, Reverdy
Head coach: Alan Walsh

== Broadcast matches ==
Broadcast matches
Round	Match	Date	Broadcast method
Semi-finals	Carcassonne vs Saint-Estève XIII Catalan	7 April 2024	Broadcast live on viàOccitanie and NA TV
Semi-finals	Avignon vs Lézignan	7 April 2024	Broadcast live on viàOccitanie and NA TV
Final	Carcassonne vs Lézignan	27 April 2024	Broadcast live on Sport en France, NA TV and viàOccitanie
