= Super XIII 2026–2027 =

Super XIII 2025–26
- League: Super XIII
- Duration: 22 rounds + playoffs
- Teams: 11
- Broadcast partners: YouTube

2025–26 season

The 2026-2027 Super XIII season is the 89th edition of the French Rugby League Championship, organiser by the French Rugby League Federation (FFR XIII), and the third season under the Super XIII name, following its rebranching from the Elite 1. The season began on 24 October 2026, later than usual dut to the 2026 Rugby League World Cup, and is scheduled to conclude with the Grand Final on 20 June 2027.

The competition features eleven clubs, unchanged from the previous season. The regular season consists of 22 rounds, with each team playing 20 matches on a home-and-away basis and receiving two byes. The six highest-ranked teams qualify for the playoffs, comprising an elimination round, semi-finals and the Grand Final.

A distinctive feature of the French rugby league system is that two French professional clubs, the Catalans Dragons and Toulouse Olympique, compete in the British Super League rather than the domestic championship. Both clubs are represented in Super XIII by their reserve teams, Saint-Estève XIII Catalan and Toulouse Olympique Élite, respectively.

The defending champions are Baroudeurs de Pia XIII, who defeated Carcassonne 31–30 after extra time in the 2025–26 Grand Final at the Stade Jean-Bouin in Paris. A decisive golden-point drop goal by Théo Fages secured Pia's first French championship title since the 2012–13 season.

== Format ==
The French Rugby League Championship is contested in two stages: a regular season followed by a playoff series. The regular season consists of 22 rounds, with the eleven participating teams playing each other twice, once at home and once away. Each team therefore plays 20 matches and receives two byes. The final league standings determine which clubs qualify for the playoffs. For the 2026–27 season, the opening round took place on the weekend of 24–25 October 2026, while the 22nd and final round is scheduled for 15–16 May 2027.

The playoffs comprise three stages. The elimination finals, scheduled for 29–30 May 2027, involve the teams finishing third to sixth in the regular season, with the third-placed team facing the sixth-placed team and the fourth-placed team meeting the fifth-placed team. The two winners advance to the semi-finals on 5–6 June 2027, where they face the two highest-ranked teams from the regular season, who qualify directly. The season concludes with the Grand Final, scheduled for the weekend of 19–20 June 2027, to determine the French champions.

Since 2016, the competition has generally featured between nine and eleven clubs, almost all based in the Occitania region or neighbouring areas, including Albi, Avignon, Carcassonne, Lézignan, Limoux, Saint-Estève, Saint-Gaudens, Toulouse, Villeneuve-sur-Lot, Pia and Villefranche-de-Rouergue. Although officially designated as a national championship, the competition has increasingly operated as a largely closed league, with no regular system of promotion and relegation. The admission of clubs from lower divisions has occasionally been considered, but promotion has not been implemented on a consistent basis.

== Teams ==
The eleven clubs competing in the 2026–27 Super XIII season are predominantly based in southern France. Nine are located in the Occitania region, while the remaining two, Villeneuve XIII RL and SO Avignon, are based in neighbouring Nouvelle-Aquitaine and Provence-Alpes-Côte d'Azur, respectively.

Although the championship has traditionally been associated with the rugby league strongholds of Aude and Pyrénées-Orientales, its geographical distribution extends across several departments of southern France. Aude has the largest representation, with three clubs (Carcassonne, Lézignan and Limoux), while Pyrénées-Orientales (Pia and Saint-Estève) and Haute-Garonne (Saint-Gaudens and Toulouse) each have two. The remaining teams represent Tarn, Aveyron, Lot-et-Garonne and Vaucluse.

=== Location of teams ===
Location of clubs competing in the 2026–27 Super XIII season: 1. Albi RL • 2. AS Carcassonne • 3. XIII Limouxin • 4. Villeneuve XIII RL • 5. Saint-Estève XIII Catalan • 6. XIII Baroudeur de Pia • 7. Villefranche XIII Aveyron • 8. FC Lézignan • 9. RC Saint-Gaudens • 10. SO Avignon • 11. Toulouse Olympique Élite

=== Participating clubs ===
Clubs competing in the 2026–27 Super XIII season
Club	Last promotion	2026–27 budget	2025–26 result	Head coach(es)	Home ground	Capacity
Albi RL	2015	€900,000	Semi-finalists	(France) Tony Gigot (Australia) Ben Shea	Stade Mazicou (Albi)	12,000
SO Avignon	2008	€350,000	Elimination finalists	(France) Julien Scaramuzza	Parc des Sports (Avignon)	17,518
AS Carcassonne	2000	€700,000	Runners-up	(France) Teddy Sadaoui (France) Mickaël Simon (France) Florent Tost	Stade Albert Domec (Carcassonne)	10,200
FC Lézignan	1990	€700,000	8th	(France) Rémi Casty	Stade du Moulin (Lézignan-Corbières)	6,000
XIII limouxin	1962	€500,000	Semi-finalists	(France) Maxime Grésèque	Stade de l'Aiguille (Limoux)	5,000
XIII Baroudeur de Pia	2022	€550,000	Champions	(France) Benoît Albert	Stade Daniel-Ambert (Pia)	6,000
Saint-Estève XIII Catalan	2000	€600,000	Elimination finalists	(England) Liam Duffy	Stade Municipal (Saint-Estève)	2,000
RC Saint-Gaudens	2016	€580,000	11th	(France) Joris Canton	Stade Jules Ribet (Saint-Gaudens)	4,000
Toulouse Olympique élite	2015	Not disclosed	7th	(France) Sébastien Raguin	Stade des Minimes (Toulouse)	4,000
Villefranche XIII Aveyron	2024	Not disclosed	9th	(Australia) Johnathon Ford (Serbia) Vladica Nikolic	Stade Henri-Lagarde (Villefranche-de-Rouergue)	2,700
Villeneuve XIII RL	1934	€300,000	10th	(France) Constant Villegas	Stade Max Rousié (Villeneuve-sur-Lot)	1,700

== Regular season ==
The regular season started on October 24, 2025. The grand final is set for the weekend of June 19–20.

=== League table ===
Super XIII standings as of 16 November 2026
Pos	Team	Pld	W	D	L	PF	PA	PD	BP	Pts	Qualification
1	AS Carcassonne	4	12	0	0	145	28	+117	0	12	Semi-finals
2	SO Avignon	4	3	0	1	104	85	+19	1	10	Semi-finals
3	XIII Limouxin	3	3	0	0	134	38	+96	0	9	Elimination finals
4	FC Lézignan	4	2	0	2	80	98	-18	1	7	Elimination finals
5	XIII Baroudeur de Pia	3	2	0	1	62	66	-4	0	6	Elimination finals
6	Saint-Estève XIII Catalan	4	2	0	2	108	122	-14	0	6	Elimination finals
7	Albi RL	3	1	0	2	92	72	+20	1	4	
8	Villefranche XIII Aveyron	3	1	0	2	31	60	-29	1	4	
9	Toulouse Olympique élite	4	1	0	3	78	127	-49	1	4	
10	RC Saint-Gaudens	4	1	0	3	62	162	-100	1	4	
11	Villeneuve XIII RL	4	0	0	4	68	106	-38	2	2	

Key: Pld = Matches played; W = Wins; D = Draws; L = Losses; PF = Points for; PA = Points against; PD = Points difference; BP = Bonus points; Pts = Competition points.

Points system: A win is worth three competition points, while a defeat by 12 points or fewer earns one defensive bonus point. No points are awarded for a defeat by more than 12 points. During the Magic Weekend, a win is worth four competition points.

Tie-breaking criteria: When two teams are level on competition points, their head-to-head points difference is used to determine their ranking.

Playoff qualification: The top two teams qualify directly for the semi-finals, while teams finishing third to sixth enter the elimination finals.

Source: Treize Mondial – Super XIII standings 2026–27.

==== Round one ====
Home	Score	Away	Match information	
Home	Score	Away	Day & time	Venue
XIII Limouxin	48–22	Villeneuve XIII RL	Saturday 24 October, 3:00pm	Stade De L'aiguille
FC Lézignan	18–28	Saint-Estève XIII Catalan	Saturday 24 October, 5:00pm	Stade du Moulin
RC Saint-Gaudens	0–52	AS Carcassonne	Saturday 24 October, 6:00pm	Stade Jules Ribet
Toulouse Olympique élite	14–48	Albi RL	Saturday 24 October, 7:00pm	Stade Arnaune
Villefranche XIII Aveyron	17–18	SO Avignon	Sunday 25 October, 3:30pm	Stade Henri Lagarde
Bye: XIII Baroudeur de Pia

==== Round two ====
Home	Score	Away	Match information	
Home	Score	Away	Day & time	Venue
SO Avignon	42–30	RC Saint-Gaudens	Saturday 31 October, 3:00pm	Parc des Sports
Villeneuve XIII RL	8–10	Villefranche XIII Aveyron	Saturday 31 October, 3:00pm	Stade De La Myre Mory
Albi RL	16–18	XIII Baroudeur de Pia	Saturday 31 October, 3:00pm	Stade Mazicou
Saint-Estève XIII Catalan	24–38	Toulouse Olympique élite	Saturday 31 October, 4:30pm	Stade Gilbert Brutus
AS Carcassonne	34–8	FC Lézignan	Sunday 1 November, 4:30pm	Stade Albert Domec
Bye: XIII Limouxin

==== Round three ====
Home	Score	Away	Match information	
Home	Score	Away	Day & time	Venue
FC Lézignan	26–14	SO Avignon	Saturday 7 November, 5:00pm	Stade Du Moulin
XIII Baroudeur de Pia	38–18	Saint-Estève XIII Catalan	Saturday 7 November, 5:30pm	Stade Daniel Ambert
Toulouse Olympique élite	14–25	AS Carcassonne	Saturday 7 November, 7:00pm	Stade Jules Ribet
Villefranche XIII Aveyron	4–34	XIII Limouxin	Sunday 8 November, 3:00pm	Stade Henri Lagarde
RC Saint-Gaudens	20–16	Villeneuve XIII RL	Sunday 8 November, 3:30pm	Stade Jules Ribet
Bye: Albi RL

==== Round four ====
Home	Score	Away	Match information	
Home	Score	Away	Day & time	Venue
Saint-Estève XIII Catalan	40–28	Albi RL	Saturday 14 November, 4:30pm	Stade Municipal
SO Avignon	30–12	Toulouse Olympique élite	Saturday 14 November, 6:00pm	Parc Des Sports
AS Carcassonne	34–6	XIII Baroudeur de Pia	Saturday 14 November, 6:00pm	Stade Albert Domec
XIII Limouxin	52–12	RC Saint-Gaudens	Sunday 15 November, 3:00pm	Stade De L'aiguille
Villeneuve XIII RL	22–28	FC Lézignan	Sunday 15 November, 3:00pm	Stade Jules Ribet
Bye: Villefranche XIII Aveyron

==== Round five ====
Home	Score	Away	Match information	
Home	Score	Away	Day & time	Venue
FC Lézignan	–	XIII Limouxin	Saturday 28 November, 5:00pm	Stade Du Moulin
Albi RL	–	AS Carcassonne	Saturday 28 November, 6:30pm	Stade Mazicou
Toulouse Olympique élite	–	Villeneuve XIII RL	Saturday 28 November, 7:00pm	Stade Arnaune
XIII Baroudeur de Pia	–	SO Avignon	Sunday 29 November, 3:00pm	Stade Daniel Ambert
RC Saint-Gaudens	–	Villefranche XIII Aveyron	Sunday 29 November, 3:00pm	Stade Jules Ribet
Bye: Saint-Estève XIII Catalan

== See also ==
- 2026 NRL season
- 2026 Super League season
