= Thirteen-a-side-game =

The Thirteen-a-side-game ( "jeu à XIII" in French) was the official name of rugby league in France from 1947 to 1993.

According to some Historians, French Rugby League, reborn after the war, was not allowed to use the word "rugby" to prevent the French Rugby League Federation from reclaiming "the assets which were stolen from it".

The banning of rugby league was indeed "decided in 1941, by the Director of Sports [Colonel Pascot], who was himself a rugby union player, and who was convinced that the disappearance of rugby league would favour the development of rugby [union]".

Therefore, "Jeu à XIII", a word which was created by Jean Galia in the 30s, became the only way to name Rugby League in official documents.

The expression is now outdated and may be used nowadays either by lack of knowledge or in a pejorative way.
