= Maxime Puech =

France international rugby league footballer

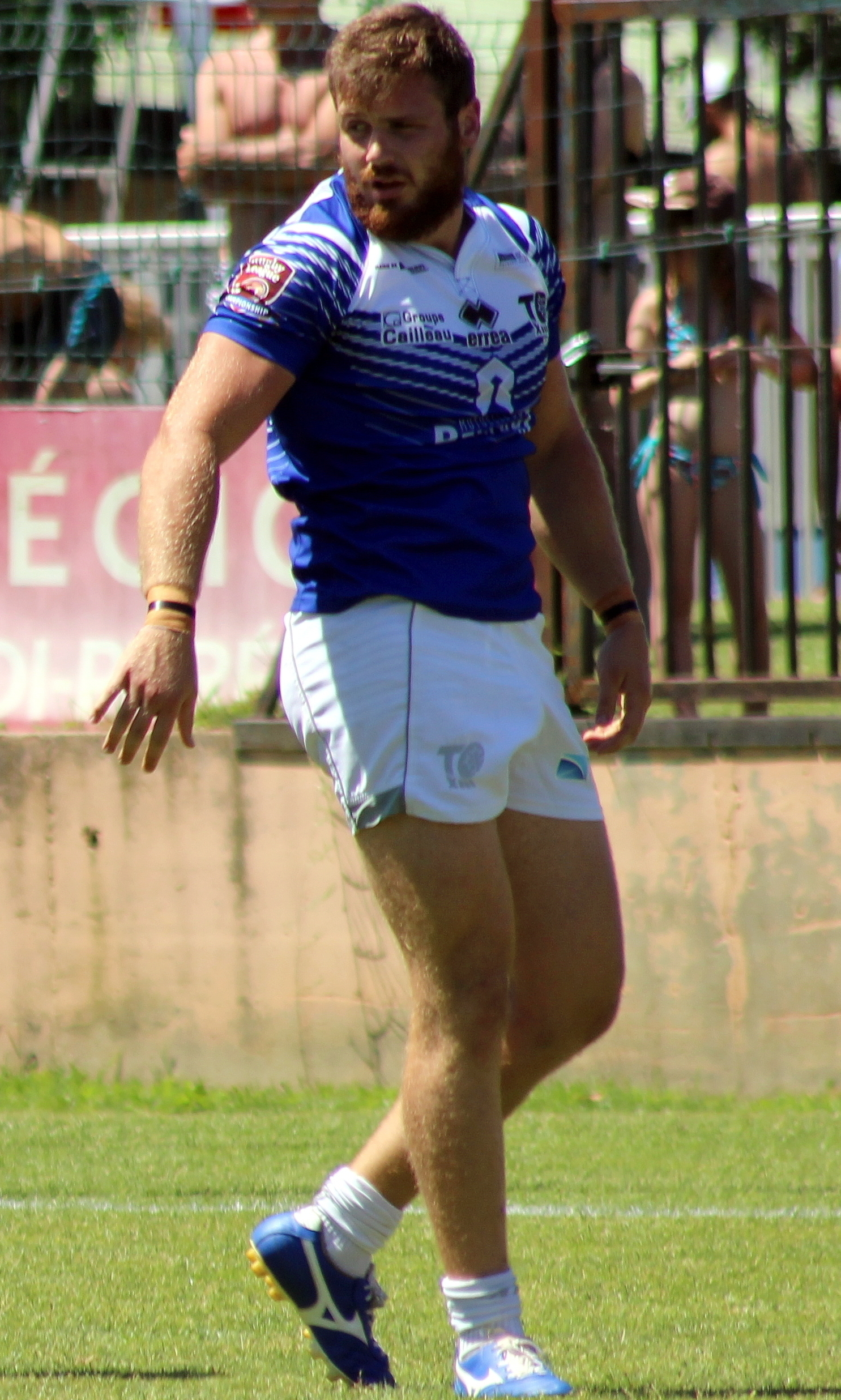

Personal information
- Born: 16 March 1994 (age 32) Tarn, France
- Height: 6 ft 0 in (1.84 m)
- Weight: 16 st 1 lb (102 kg)

Playing information
- Position: Prop, Loose forward
Club
Years	Team	Pld	T	G	FG	P
2014–22	Toulouse Olympique	65	6	0	0	24
2015(loan)	→ Toulouse Broncos	9	0	0	0	0
2018(loan)	→ Toulouse Broncos	2	0	0	0	0
2023–	Albi XIII	0	0	0	0	0
	Total	76	6	0	0	24
Representative
Years	Team	Pld	T	G	FG	P
2019–	France	2	0	0	0	0
- Source: As of 3 January 2023

Maxime Puech (born 16 March 1994) is a French professional rugby league footballer who plays as a prop for Albi XIII in the Elite One Championship and France at international level.

== Background ==
Puech was born in Tarn, France.

== International ==
He made his international debut in the 62-4 defeat on 25 Oct 2019 against the Junior Kangaroos.
