= Coupe de France Lord Derby =

French rugby league football competition

- Current season or competition: Lord Derby Cup 2025–2026
- Sport: Rugby league
- Instituted: 1934
- Country: France (FFR XIII)
- Holders: AS Carcassonne (2025–26)
- Most titles: AS Carcassonne (18 titles)
- Website: Lord Derby Cup on FFR13.fr
- Broadcast partner: viàOccitanie

The Coupe de France Lord Derby (lit. 'Lord Derby French Cup'), or just Coupe Lord Derby ('Lord Derby Cup'), is the premier knockout competition for the sport of rugby league football in France, as well as the name of its championship trophy. The tournament was first contested in 1934–35, which also marked the inaugural season of the French Rugby League Championship.

Each round is played in single-elimination mode. The Lord Derby Cup was previously open to all professional and amateur clubs, but since the 2023–2024 edition has been limited to teams in the top two divisions.

== Format ==
For much of the tournament's history, games played at predetermined or mutually agreed upon neutral sites were the norm. While Toulouse struggled to field a stable team in the new code until 1937, it was still the go-to host city for many games during the tournament's formative years, both because it was viewed as a key market and because the relationship with rugby union authorities was much less contentious there than elsewhere in the country. In fact, Stade Toulousain considered renting its Stade Ernest-Wallon to the French Rugby League for the 1939 Lord Derby Cup final, before organizers settled on Stade du TOEC. In the modern era, games at predetermined sites were gradually reduced to encourage fan attendance, and are typically only used in the last two rounds.

While all divisions have been actively encouraged to send teams in recent times, the level of amateur participation has varied over the years. In the 2023–24 season, only teams in the top two divisions, Elite 1 and Elite 2, took part in the competition.

== Trophy ==
Following in the footsteps of his father Frederick, patron of ice hockey's Stanley Cup, Edward Stanley, 17th Earl of Derby, donated the silver trophy that bears his name to inaugural French Cup champions US Lyon-Villeurbanne in 1935. Stanley was honorary president of the Rugby Football League, a former minister and former British ambassador in Paris. The trophy was actually not presented to the Lyon players during the French Cup final. Rather, it was handed over to them one week later on 12 May 1935 by John Wilson, general secretary of the Rugby Football League, at Stade Buffalo near Paris, during a special Cup Winners' Match against Challenge Cup champions Castleford, for which Lyon had qualified by virtue of their domestic cup win.

The actual name of the trophy, as engraved on the bowl, is Coupe de Lord Derby, although the more natural-sounding "Coupe Lord Derby" is almost always preferred. Among the rugby league crowd, the cup is affectionately known as La vieille dame ('The Old Lady'). Since 2017, each player from the winning team has received a replica of the cup for him to keep, which is slightly smaller than the original at 30 cm (12 in) in height.

== Notable cup runs ==
=== Cinderella runs ===
The Lord Derby Cup has historically been dominated by first division teams. Nonetheless, one-off wins by lower division clubs are not unheard of, and a handful of underdogs have produced cinderella runs over the years. In 1983, fourth-level side Le Soler advanced to the semifinals, beating top-flight club Pia in the process, before losing to powerhouse XIII Catalan. In 2005, third-level team Salses beat two Elite 1 teams (Lyon-Villeurbanne and Villeneuve-sur-Lot) before bowing out in the semifinals as well, this time to Limoux.

=== Toulouse curse ===
Toulouse Olympique has endured many heartbreaks in the Lord Derby Cup, losing all of its first six finals, including three straight between 1962 and 1964. One of star player Georges Aillères' career regrets was never hoisting the Lord Derby Cup while playing for his longtime club, despite making it to four finals with them. Ironically, he won the trophy in his only season played away from Toulouse, in 1965 with Lézignan. Toulouse would eventually break the curse in 2014, in their seventh final appearance.

== Satellite tournaments ==
=== Junior French Cup ===
The equivalent of the Lord Derby Cup for Under-19 players is the Coupe Luc-Nitard ('Luc Nitard Cup'), whose final has traditionally been played as a curtain-raiser to the Lord Derby Cup final.

=== Other cup competitions ===
To provide minor league clubs with a more accessible level of competition, the French federation has maintained a trio of secondary cup tournaments which are reserved for them. Each of these tournaments is marketed as a "Coupe de France" in its own right, although in practice they more closely fit the definition of a league cup. They are:

- The Coupe Georges-Aillères ('Georges Aillères Cup'), for clubs at the Elite 2 level
- The Coupe Paul-Dejean ('Paul Dejean Cup'), for clubs at the National Division level
- The Coupe Albert-Falcou ('Albert Falcou Cup'), for clubs at the Federal Division level.

== List of Finals ==
=== Results ===
| Year | Winners | Score | Runner-up | Venue | Attendance | Ref. |
|---|---|---|---|---|---|---|
| 1934–35 | Lyon | 22–7 | XIII Catalan | Stade Jacques-Thomas, Toulouse | 6,000 | |
| 1935–36 | Côte Basque | 15–8 | Villeneuve | Parc de Suzon, Talence | 12,600 | |
| 1936–37 | Villeneuve | 12–6 | XIII Catalan | Parc de Suzon, Talence | 12,100 | |
| 1937–38 | Roanne | 36–12 | Villeneuve | Stade des Minimes, Toulouse | 11,000 | |
| 1938–39 | XIII Catalan | 7–3 | Toulouse | Stade du TOEC, Toulouse | 15,200 | |
| 1939–40 | Final did not take place due to the Second World War | | | | | (Note: Both semifinals were scheduled for 5 May 1940. Côte Basque beat XIII Catalan 14–5 in Bordeaux for the first final spot, but prior commitments at Toulouse's Stade des Minimes forced the postponement of the second semifinal between Pau and Carcassonne to 12 May. On 10 May, German troops invaded Belgium, the Netherlands and Luxembourg, forcing the cancellation of the remainder of the competition, whose final was scheduled for 19 May 1940 in Bordeaux.) |
| 1940–44 | Rugby league banned by Vichy regime | | | | | |
| 1944–45 | XIII Catalan | 23–14 | Carcassonne | Parc des Princes, Paris | | |
| 1945–46 | Carcassonne | 27–7 | XIII Catalan | Stade Jacques-Chapou, Toulouse | 18,000 | |
| 1946–47 | Carcassonne | 24–5 | Avignon | Stade Vélodrome, Marseille | | |
| 1947–48 | Marseille | 5–4 | Carcassonne | Stade Jacques-Chapou, Toulouse | | |
| 1948–49 | Marseille | 12–9 | Carcassonne | Stade Vélodrome, Marseille | 24,000 | |
| 1949–50 | XIII Catalan | 12–5 | Lyon | Stade Albert-Domec, Carcassonne | 13,500 | |
| 1950–51 | Carcassonne | 22–10 | Lyon | Stade Vélodrome, Marseille | | |
| 1951–52 | Carcassonne | 28–9 | XIII Catalan | Stade Vélodrome, Marseille | 14,384 | |
| 1952–53 | Lyon | 9–8 | Villeneuve | Stade Jean-Laffon, Perpignan | 12,200 | |
| 1953–54 | Lyon | 17–15 | XIII Catalan | Stade Joseph-Lombard, Cavaillon | 8,000 | |
| 1954–55 | Avignon | 18–10 | Marseille | Stade de la Roseraie, Carpentras | 11,600 | |
| 1955–56 | Avignon | 25–12 | Bordeaux | Stade Jean-Laffon, Perpignan | 5,800 | |
| 1956–57 | Marseille | 11–0 | XIII Catalan | Stade Albert-Domec, Carcassonne | 16,633 | |
| 1957–58 | Villeneuve | 20–8 | Avignon | Stade Jean-Laffon, Perpignan | 5,473 | |
| 1958–59 | XIII Catalan | 7–0 | Avignon | Stade Albert-Domec, Carcassonne | 11,000 | |
| 1959–60 | Lézignan | 7–4 | Carcassonne | Stade Jean-Laffon, Perpignan | 15,800 | |
| 1960–61 | Carcassonne | 5–2 | Lézignan | Stade Jean-Laffon, Perpignan | | |
| 1961–62 | Roanne | 16–10 | Toulouse | Stade Gilbert-Brutus, Perpignan | 8,395 | |
| 1962–63 | Carcassonne | 5–0 | Toulouse | Stade Gilbert-Brutus, Perpignan | 5,100 | |
| 1963–64 | Villeneuve | 10–2 | Toulouse | Stade Gilbert-Brutus, Perpignan | 5,166 | |
| 1964–65 | Marseille | 13–8 | Carcassonne | Stade Gilbert-Brutus, Perpignan | 8,294 | |
| 1965–66 | Lézignan | 22–7 | Villeneuve | Stade Albert-Domec, Carcassonne | 10,067 | |
| 1966–67 | Carcassonne | 10–4 | XIII Catalan | Stade Gilbert-Brutus, Perpignan | 16,250 | |
| 1967–68 | Carcassonne | 9–2 | Toulouse | Stade Gilbert-Brutus, Perpignan | 6,400 | |
| 1968–69 | XIII Catalan | 15–8 | Villeneuve | Stade Gilbert-Brutus, Perpignan | 9,532 | |
| 1969–70 | Lézignan | 14–8 | Villeneuve | Stade Gilbert-Brutus, Perpignan | 7,460 | |
| 1970–71 | Marseille | 17–2 | Lézignan | Stade Gilbert-Brutus, Perpignan | 6,310 | |
| 1971–72 | Saint-Estève | 12–5 | Villeneuve | Stade Gilbert-Brutus, Perpignan | 8,250 | |
| 1972–73 | Saint-Gaudens | 22–8 | Carcassonne | Stade Albert-Domec, Carcassonne | 10,300 | |
| 1973–74 | Albi | 21–11 | Lézignan | Stade Gilbert-Brutus, Perpignan | 6,580 | |
| 1974–75 | Pia | 9–4 | Marseille | Stade Gilbert-Brutus, Perpignan | 9,021 | |
| 1975–76 | XIII Catalan | 23–8 | Toulouse | Stade Gilbert-Brutus, Perpignan | 6,395 | |
| 1976–77 | Carcassonne | 21–16 | XIII Catalan | Parc des Sports et de l'Amitié, Narbonne | 10,085 | |
| 1977–78 | XIII Catalan | 18–7 | Lézignan | Parc des Sports et de l'Amitié, Narbonne | 15,939 | |
| 1978–79 | Villeneuve | 15–5 | Carcassonne | Stadium Municipal, Albi | 6,642 | |
| 1979–80 | XIII Catalan | 18–8 | Carcassonne | Parc des Sports et de l'Amitié, Narbonne | 8,783 | |
| 1980–81 | Final cancelled | | | | | (Note: The final between AS Carcassonne and XIII Catalan was cancelled as a result of a game-ending brawl involving XIII Catalan at the championship final the previous week.) |
| 1981–82 | Avignon | 18–12 | Carcassonne | Parc des Sports et de l'Amitié, Narbonne | 4,663 | |
| 1982–83 | Carcassonne | 10–3 | XIII Catalan | Parc des Sports et de l'Amitié, Narbonne | 7,235 | |
| 1983–84 | Villeneuve | 18–7 | Limoux | Parc des Sports et de l'Amitié, Narbonne | 6,851 | |
| 1984–85 | XIII Catalan | 24–7 | Limoux | Parc des Sports et de l'Amitié, Narbonne | 11,362 | |
| 1985–86 | Le Pontet | 35–10 | Saint-Estève | Parc des Sports et de l'Amitié, Narbonne | | |
| 1986–87 | Saint-Estève | 20–10 | XIII Catalan | Parc des Sports et de l'Amitié, Narbonne | 8590 | |
| 1987–88 | Le Pontet | 5–2 | Saint-Estève | Parc des Sports et de l'Amitié, Narbonne | 5,000 | |
| 1988–89 | Avignon | 12–11 | Saint-Estève | Stadium Municipal, Albi | 6,000 | |
| 1989–90 | Carcassonne | 22–8 | Saint-Estève | Stadium Municipal, Albi | 6,832 | |
| 1990–91 | Saint-Gaudens | 30–4 | Pia | Stade Albert-Domec, Carcassonne | 6,000 | |
| 1991–92 | Saint-Gaudens | 22–10 | RC Carpentras | Parc des Sports et de l'Amitié, Narbonne | 7,000 | |
| 1992–93 | Saint-Estève | 12–10 | XIII Catalan | Parc des Sports et de l'Amitié, Narbonne | 6,401 | |
| 1993–94 | Saint-Estève | 14–12 | XIII Catalan | Stade Albert-Domec, Carcassonne | | |
| 1994–95 | Saint-Estève | 28–8 | Pia | Stade Gilbert-Brutus, Perpignan | 6,000 | |
| 1995–96 | Limoux | 39–12 | Carcassonne | Stade Gilbert-Brutus, Perpignan | 9,000 | |
| 1996–97 | XIII Catalan | 25–24 (Note: After extra time) | Limoux | Stade Albert-Domec, Carcassonne | 8,000 | |
| 1997–98 | Saint-Estève | 38–0 | Avignon | Stade Albert-Domec, Carcassonne | 7,000 | |
| 1998–99 | Villeneuve | 20–5 | Lézignan | Parc des Sports et de l'Amitié, Narbonne | 9,000 | |
| 1999–2000 | Villeneuve | 34–14 | XIII Catalan | Parc des Sports et de l'Amitié, Narbonne | 9,000 | |
| 2000–01 | Union Treiziste Catalane | 38–17 | Limoux | Parc des Sports et de l'Amitié, Narbonne | 8,000 | |
| 2001–02 | Villeneuve | 27–18 | Pia | Stade Albert-Domec, Carcassonne | 8,500 | |
| 2002–03 | Villeneuve | 16–14 | Pia | Stade Albert-Domec, Carcassonne | 7,000 | |
| 2003–04 | Union Treiziste Catalane | 36–24 | Carcassonne | Stade Albert-Domec, Carcassonne | 10,500 | |
| 2004–05 | Union Treiziste Catalane | 31–12 | Limoux | Stade Albert-Domec, Carcassonne | 11,000 | |
| 2005–06 | Pia | 36–20 | Lézignan | Stade Albert-Domec, Carcassonne | 9,344 | |
| 2006–07 | Pia | 30–14 | Carcassonne | Stade Albert-Domec, Carcassonne | 5,500 | |
| 2007–08 | Limoux | 17–14 | Albi | Stade Albert-Domec, Carcassonne | 7,751 | |
| 2008–09 | Carcassonne | 18–16 | Limoux | Stadium Municipal, Albi | 6,697 | |
| 2009–10 | Lézignan | 18–14 | Limoux | Parc des Sports, Avignon | 8,140 | |
| 2010–11 | Lézignan | 27–18 | Pia | Stade Albert-Domec, Carcassonne | 5,350 | |
| 2011–12 | Carcassonne | 14–12 | Pia | Parc des Sports et de l'Amitié, Narbonne | 6,892 | |
| 2012–13 | Avignon | 38–37 | Limoux | Stade Albert-Domec, Carcassonne | 6,877 | |
| 2013–14 | Toulouse | 46–10 | Carcassonne | Stade Albert-Domec, Carcassonne | 6,763 | |
| 2014–15 | Lézignan | 27–25 | Saint-Estève XIII Catalan | Stade Albert-Domec, Carcassonne | 4,124 | |
| 2015–16 | Saint-Estève XIII Catalan | 33–16 | Limoux | Stade Albert-Domec, Carcassonne | 4,200 | |
| 2016–17 | Carcassonne | 30–24 | Lézignan | Parc des Sports, Avignon | 5,500 | |
| 2017–18 | Saint-Estève XIII Catalan | 30–26 (Note: Golden point) | Limoux | Stade Gilbert-Brutus, Perpignan | 5,243 | |
| 2018–19 | Carcassonne | 22–6 | Saint-Estève XIII Catalan | Stade Gilbert-Brutus, Perpignan | 5,000 | |
| 2019–20 | Competition abandoned due to the COVID-19 pandemic in France | | | | | |
| 2020–21 | Competition cancelled due to the COVID-19 pandemic in France | | | | | |
| 2021–22 | Competition abandoned due to a resurgence of COVID-19 induced by the Omicron variant | | | | | |
| 2022–23 | Carcassonne | 36–12 | Albi | Stade Gilbert-Brutus, Perpignan | 4,102 | |
| 2023–24 | Carcassonne | 22–6 | Lézignan | Stade Gilbert-Brutus, Perpignan | | |
| 2024–25 | Saint-Estève XIII Catalan | 26–18 | Albi | Parc des Sports et de l'Amitié, Narbonne | | |
| 2025–26 | Carcassonne | 44–6 | Albi | Stade Gilbert-Brutus, Perpignan | 3,500 | |

== Gallery ==
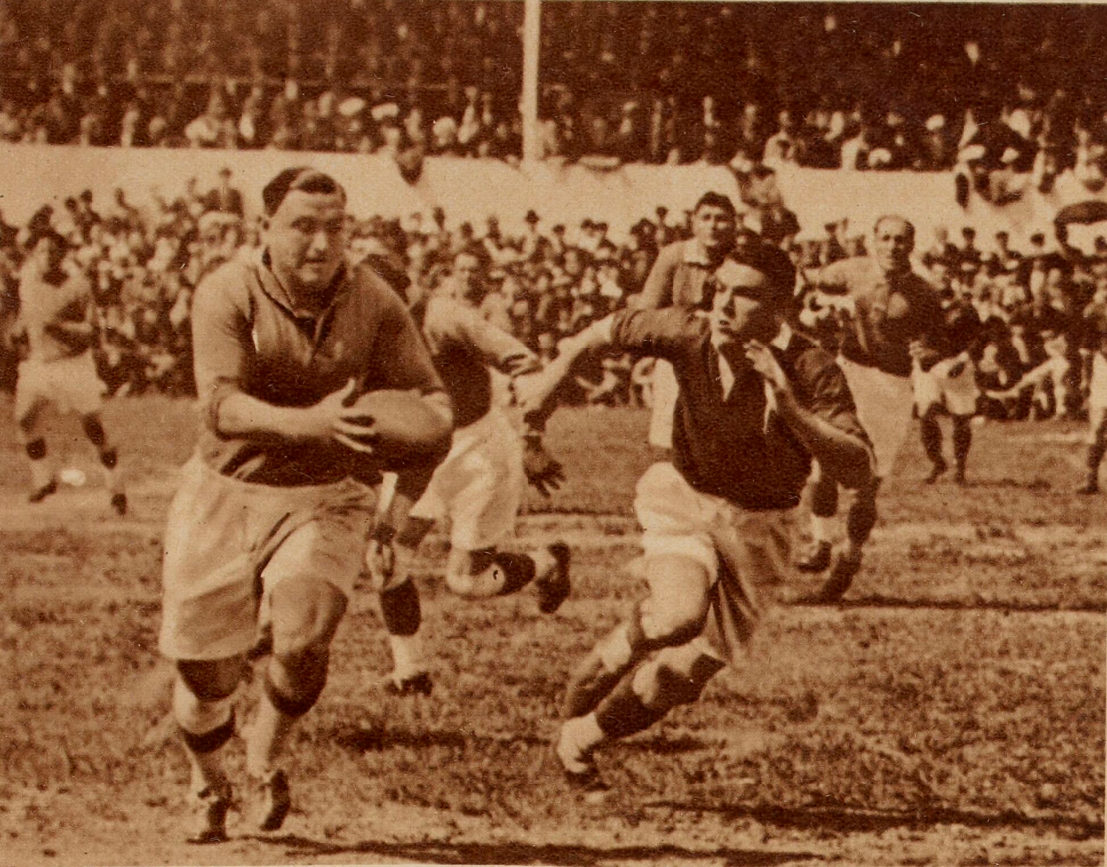
Roanne vs Villeneuve in the 1938 Final

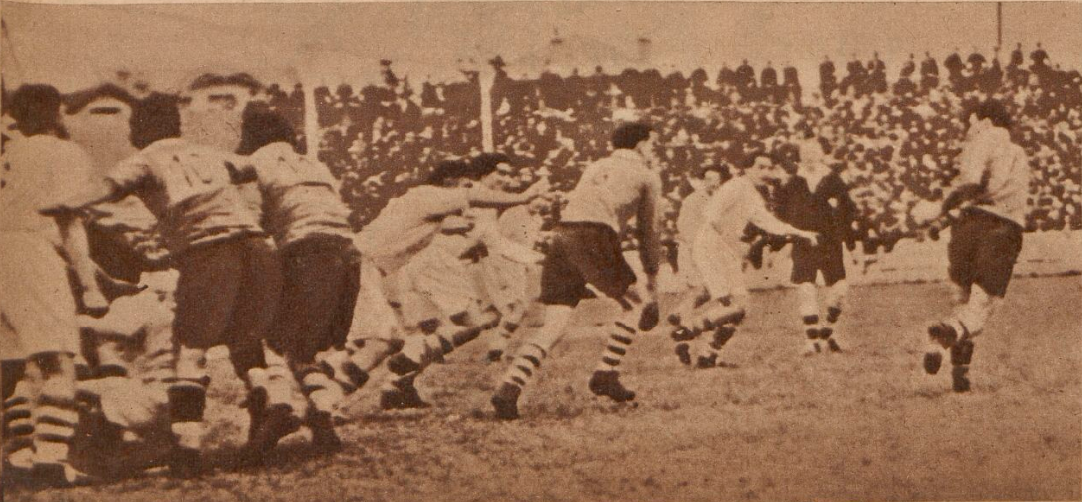
Catalan vs Toulouse in the 1939 Final

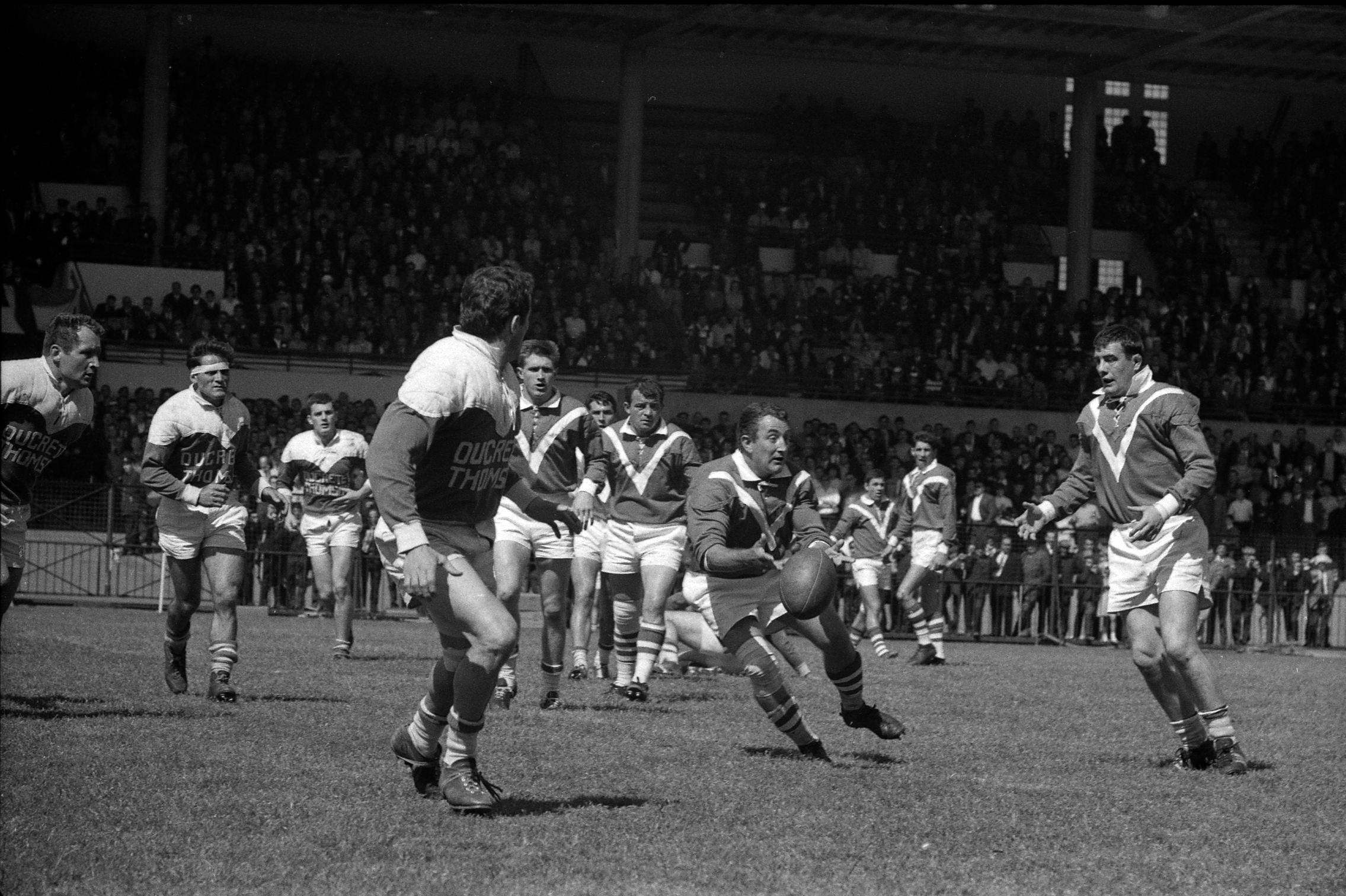
Villeneuve vs Toulouse in the 1964 Final

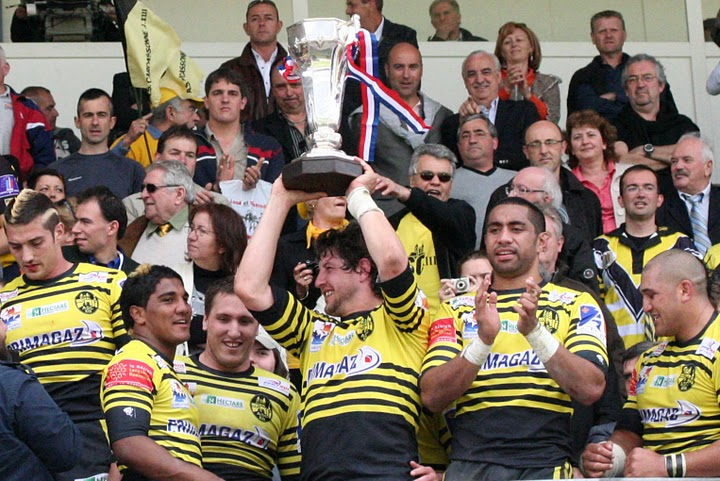
Carcassonne celebrating winning the 2008-09 competition

== See also ==
- Rugby league in France
- French rugby league system
- Challenge Cup
