= Ban of rugby league in France =

Decree of 19 December 1941

Vichy France
- Long title: Decree of 19 December 1941 dissolving the association known as the French Rugby League
- Citation: Decree No. 5285
- Territorial extent: France
- Signed by: Philippe Pétain
- Signed: 19 December 1941
- Effective: January 1942

Summary
- Dissolution of the French Rugby League and confiscation of its assets
- Status: Repealed

The ban of rugby league in France was imposed by the Vichy government during the Second World War. On 19 December 1941, a decree signed by Marshal Philippe Pétain ordered the dissolution of the French Rugby League, the governing body of rugby league in France. Published in the Journal officiel on 27 December 1941, the decree brought an end to the official organisation of the sport and provided for the liquidation of the federation's assets.

Introduced to France in 1934 by Jean Galia, rugby league had developed rapidly during the 1930s, establishing professional and amateur competitions and attracting players from rugby union. Its expansion intensified an existing rivalry with the French Rugby Federation, which governed rugby union. The suppression of rugby league took place within the wider reorganisation of French sport undertaken by the Vichy regime, whose policy favoured amateurism and placed sporting federations under closer state supervision. According to a historical report commissioned by the French Ministry of Youth and Sports and submitted in 2002, leading officials of French rugby union also played a significant role in securing the prohibition of the rival code.

Rugby league resumed in France following the Liberation in 1944, with its national competitions being re-established. However, the federation did not recover its former assets or immediately regain the same administrative status as other sporting bodies. In 1946, it received only provisional recognition from the state, while restrictions surrounding the use of the term "rugby" continued for decades. The federation eventually recovered its official name, Fédération française de rugby à XIII, following a legal dispute that concluded in 1993.

== Background ==
=== Ideology of the National Revolution ===
This decision originated in the sporting component of the National Revolution promoted by the Vichy regime, which sought to ban professionalism from sport.

It was based on the principle that the moral revival of France had to be achieved through improved physical fitness, expressed in the slogans "Be strong to serve better" and "Be strong to be useful".

The Vichy regime regarded professional sport as a drift towards excessive competition and specialisation, considered morally and physically pointless because it could only lead to spectacle and professionalism.

This outlook was inspired by the views of Pierre de Coubertin, a staunch advocate of pure sporting amateurism, and naval officer Georges Hébert, who promoted a natural method of physical education, known as Hébertisme, opposed to Swedish gymnastics and sporting specialisation imported from the Anglo-Saxon world.

Behind these two slogans, the aim was to exercise strict control over young people, sports associations and their respective federations. It was also during this period that French schoolchildren learned to run, jump and climb, while the CREPS and the USSU were established.

=== Conflicts and rivalries within rugby's governing bodies against a backdrop of economic crisis ===
By the 1930s, rugby had been played in France since the 1870s and, as in Britain, the sport was becoming increasingly professional (payment of players, recruitment between clubs, etc.), leading to unregulated transfers and economic inequalities that profoundly disrupted the championships.

A majority of clubs denounced this situation and broke away in December 1930 to establish the Union française de rugby amateur, refusing to allow their players to be selected for the French national team and thereby weakening its standard of play. This temporary split lasted until May 1932 and ended with reunification accompanied by strict and restrictive regulations prohibiting transfers without the consent of the player's original club.

Heavy suspensions were imposed on certain players who failed to comply with these rules. One of them was Jean Galia, who subsequently introduced professional rugby league to France in 1934.

Meanwhile, in 1931, the French national rugby team was suspended from the Five Nations Championship because of professionalism, while the British federations refused to play any further matches against France until further notice, "in view of the unsatisfactory conditions under which Rugby Football is played in France" and until they were satisfied that the control and conduct of the game had been organised on a satisfactory basis.

Alongside these political conflicts, the French Rugby Federation saw its membership decline: the number of affiliated clubs fell from 784 in 1930 to 663 in 1934 and then to 558 in 1939. This was partly due to the Great Depression, which forced many clubs to cease their activities altogether, but also to an extremely violent style of play that discouraged prospective players.

The rugby league federation, which had started from nothing in 1934, was expanding rapidly with considerable support from the press and sponsors. By 1939, it comprised between 155 and 160 clubs, while its professional championship included 14 teams.

== Implementation under Vichy ==
At least three men contributed to implementing this interventionist policy, one of whose central aims was the elimination of professional sport imported from the United Kingdom:

- Jean Ybarnégaray: founding president of the French and International Basque Pelota Federations, a deputy and member of the French Social Party (PSF), he was appointed Minister of State responsible for Youth and the Family in May 1940;
- Jean Borotra: a former internationally renowned tennis player and member of the French Social Party (PSF), he served as Commissioner-General for Sport from August 1940 to April 1942;
- Joseph Pascot: a former rugby player and French champion with Perpignan, he was Director of Sports under Borotra before succeeding him as Commissioner-General for Sport from April 1942 to July 1944.

On 22 August 1940, Jean Ybarnégaray declared: "The fate of rugby league is clear: it has had its day and has been purely and simply erased from French sport."

On 17 October 1940, Albert Ginesty, president of the French Rugby Federation (rugby union), and Paul Voivenel, honorary president of the FFR and author of the 1942 book Mon beau rugby, which denied the existence of rugby league (a passage removed from later editions), campaigned for rugby league to be banned. A report to this effect was submitted to Jean Borotra, Commissioner-General for General Education and Sport from July 1940 to April 1942.

According to historian Jean-Louis Gay-Lescot, the suppression of rugby league was largely the result of efforts by leading officials of the French Rugby Federation, the governing body of rugby union, who took advantage of the circumstances under the Vichy regime to eliminate a rival sport. Rugby league, introduced to France in 1934, had grown rapidly and attracted prominent rugby union players, while the latter code was experiencing difficulties. Among those advocating the suppression of rugby league was Dr Paul Voivenel, honorary president of the French Rugby Federation.

Meanwhile, the new Minister of Sport in the Laval government of 1942, Joseph Pascot, attacked professionalism in sport, a practice imported from the United Kingdom, in favour of pure amateurism.

The practice of rugby league was banned on 19 December 1941, with immediate consequences for the federation:

- dissolution and loss of assets for both the 13 "professional" clubs (that is, those which compensated their players) and the 142 to 146 amateur clubs belonging to the French Rugby League;
- seizure of the movable and immovable property of the French Rugby League and its clubs, amounting to between two and three million francs at the time (equivalent to €0.60–0.91 million in 2006). Some of these assets may have been partially appropriated by the French Rugby Union Federation.

By the time the decree was issued, many of the 155 to 159 rugby league clubs concerned had already ceased their activities, taken up other sports or switched to rugby union under the French Rugby Federation (FFR), as early as October 1940. The decree therefore primarily affected the French Rugby League itself, whose organisational structure had already been severely weakened.

During the same period, tennis and wrestling were simply required to adopt amateur status, while association football, cycling, boxing and Basque pelota were granted a three-year period. Professional tennis players such as Henri Cochet and Robert Ramillon were thus reinstated as amateurs and allowed to compete against the leading amateur players.

Vichy also removed other smaller single-sport amateur federations from the French sporting landscape by placing them under the authority of another federation and transferring their assets to it. These included table tennis, real tennis and badminton, which were placed under the supervision of the tennis federation. The regime also seized the movable and immovable property of multi-sport amateur federations such as the FSGT, UFOLEP and USEP. It also banned women's football and cycling competitions, deemed "harmful to women", as well as one rugby union club, US Lectoure in the Gers department.

At the same time, between June and September 1941, the Vichy regime authorised the establishment of a new sports federation in France: handball, a sport of German origin (codified between 1917 and 1920 and derived from another German game, torball). However, at the end of 1944, in accordance with Article 3 of the Algiers ordinance, the establishment of the French Handball Federation was annulled. Following several investigations, the FFHB was not able to be established until July 1952.

The final blow to rugby league, delivered by Decree No. 5285 of 19 December 1941, signed by Pétain on 20 December 1941 and applicable from January 1942, may well have originated in Berlin, in parallel with the emergence of the French Handball Federation.

Rugby league was also banned in November 1940 from school, secondary school and university clubs that had practised it since the 1935–36 season. Their number had increased from 52 to 79 by the 1938–39 season. These clubs were not members of the French Rugby League but belonged to the sports federations responsible for sport in schools, secondary schools and universities. They were affiliated with UFOLEP (founded in 1928), OSU (founded in 1931, renamed OSSU in 1938, ASSU in 1962 and UNSS in 1975), or USEP (founded in 1939).

In 2013, the weekly magazine L'Équipe Magazine described the ban on rugby league as "one of the greatest scandals in French sporting history".

== Post-war period ==
Under an ordinance issued on 2 October 1943 by the French Committee of National Liberation, made applicable by the ordinance of 9 August 1944 of the Provisional Government of the French Republic (GPRF, 3 June 1944 – 30 August 1944, in Algiers), associations that had been dissolved automatically regained their legal existence and were entitled to the restitution or return of their assets, provided they were legally constituted groups, associations or sports federations that had existed on 16 June 1940.

State control over sports federations nevertheless continued through the system of official approval of sporting groups and associations established by the Vichy regime. In contrast to the Vichy conception, all forms of state control, politicisation, regimentation and subsidies to religious movements were firmly rejected, and state supervision was strictly technical and material.

On the basis of this legislation, the French Rugby League was reconstituted and resumed its championships and cup competitions in October 1944, under the leadership of former and new club officials. The vast majority of its former players, who had been forced to move to rugby union clubs in order to continue playing rugby, returned. With the support of Paul Barrière, the league regained official recognition from the National Sports Council, chaired by Alfred Eluère (president of the FFR), in 1946.

The French Rugby League did not, however, recover all its movable property, some of which had been allocated to rugby union or other sports, such as handball, introduced into France in September 1941, or simply transferred to the Comité national des sports (CNS).

The difficulties faced by French rugby league persisted after the Liberation. Under the order of 25 November 1946, the French Rugby League did not receive the same permanent delegation of authority as the 43 federations recognised by the state. Instead, it was granted only provisional delegation, alongside a small number of other sporting organisations. According to the 2002 report on sport under the Occupation, rugby league remained outside the ordinary legal framework and had still not recovered its assets.

In July 1947 and again in July 1948, having suffered persecution under the Vichy regime and unwilling to be excluded from French sport or to bring about its own demise, or being unable to cope with the situation, the league was forced to adopt a new name, established by the order of 11 April 1949, published in the Journal officiel on 22 April 1949:

- Jeu à XIII for its amateur form (Jean Galia had coined the term jeu à treize in March–April 1934);
- Ligue de rugby à XIII for its semi-professional or professional form.

== Legal battle ==
In 1985, Jacques Soppelsa, president of the French Federation of Jeu à XIII, launched legal proceedings to restore the name "rugby à XIII" (rugby league).

He eventually succeeded following a legal battle with the French Rugby Federation, initially presided over by Albert Ferrasse (1968–1991) and subsequently by Bernard Lapasset (1991–2008). Ferrasse declared: "I will simply say this, and it is a free warning: we will not allow this to happen! [...] I do not want war, but I tell you, gentlemen, that if we have to fight it, we will wage it to the end! And too bad if we bring down the Federation of Jeu à XIII."

On 31 March 1989, the Conseil d'État, ruling in an administrative dispute, issued a judgment against the Ministry of Youth and Sports, which continued to use the name "Fédération française de jeu à XIII" when delegating powers to sports federations (whether through persistence or an administrative error), even though that designation no longer had any legal basis or validity under the laws of the Republic.

In a ruling of 4 June 1993, the Court of Cassation allowed the federation to resume the name "Fédération française de rugby à XIII" (FFR à XIII). The Court of Cassation definitively dismissed the appeal brought by the French Rugby Union Federation, which had appealed after losing its case before the Paris Court of Appeal two years earlier. The Court of Appeal had upheld the judgment of the Paris Tribunal de grande instance of 29 September 1987, which had ruled that, as a generic term, the word "rugby" could not be the exclusive property of a single federation. The French Rugby Union Federation was ordered to pay the legal costs.

== Remembrance ==
Founded in 1997 and led notably by Robert Fassolette and the British national Cliff Spracklen, the association "XIII actif" set itself, among other objectives, the task of "working towards the historical rehabilitation of rugby league" and "bringing to public attention the present-day consequences of the ban on this sport and the confiscation of its assets under the Vichy regime, in order to obtain any possible lawful and legitimate compensation".

The report, entitled La politique du sport et de l'éducation physique en France pendant l'Occupation, was submitted to Minister Marie-George Buffet on 19 March 2002. Initially printed in a limited edition of 50 numbered copies, it examined the policies implemented by the Vichy regime towards French sport, including the suppression of rugby league. The report highlighted the role played by certain senior rugby union officials in securing the ban on the rival code. It was subsequently published by INSEP Éditions in 2018, making its findings more widely accessible.

In March 2000, Marie-George Buffet, Minister of Youth and Sports, commissioned a group of twelve historians and researchers, chaired by historian Jean-Pierre Azéma, to investigate sporting policies under the Vichy regime. Their report, entitled La politique du sport et de l'éducation physique en France pendant l'Occupation, was submitted to the minister on 19 March 2002. Initially printed in a limited edition of 50 numbered copies, the report examined the policies implemented by Vichy towards French sport, including the suppression of rugby league. It highlighted the role played by certain senior rugby union officials in securing the ban on the rival code. The report was subsequently published by INSEP Éditions in 2018. The commission submitted its report in March 2002, consisting of approximately 190 pages and printed in 50 copies, of which one and a half pages were devoted to rugby league. It confirmed the influence exerted on the Vichy regime by two or three pro-Vichy officials from the national governing bodies of rugby union in securing the ban on its rival.

Apart from Marie-George Buffet in May 2000, no minister or major political figure had attended a rugby league final (championship or Lord Derby Cup) for several decades. Furthermore, no member of the French national rugby league teams, with the exception of Puig Aubert, had been awarded the Legion of Honour in recognition of their contribution to the nation through their sport.

== Media coverage ==
Paradoxically, it is in the English-speaking rugby league world that this tragic episode in the history of French rugby league has received the greatest attention, particularly since the British author Mike Rylance published a book on the subject in English and French in 2006, Le rugby interdit : L'histoire occultée du rugby à XIII en France (The Forbidden Rugby: The Hidden History of Rugby League in France). English-language media regularly cover the subject, repeatedly calling on the French state or the French Rugby Federation to account for what happened.

== Bibliography ==
- Jean-Pierre Azéma, ed. (March 2002). La politique du sport et de l'éducation physique en France pendant l'Occupation (Report) (in French). Ministère de la Jeunesse et des Sports.
- Collin, Jean-Christophe (11 May 2013). "La grande spoliation". L'Équipe magazine (in French) (1608): 39–49.
- Fassolette, Robert (12 October 2023). "Ce que le XV doit au XIII. Une histoire occultée, en France plus qu'ailleurs". Football(s). Histoire, culture, économie, société (in French) (3): 79–92. doi:10.58335/football-s.497.
