= Clément Boyer =

France international rugby league footballer

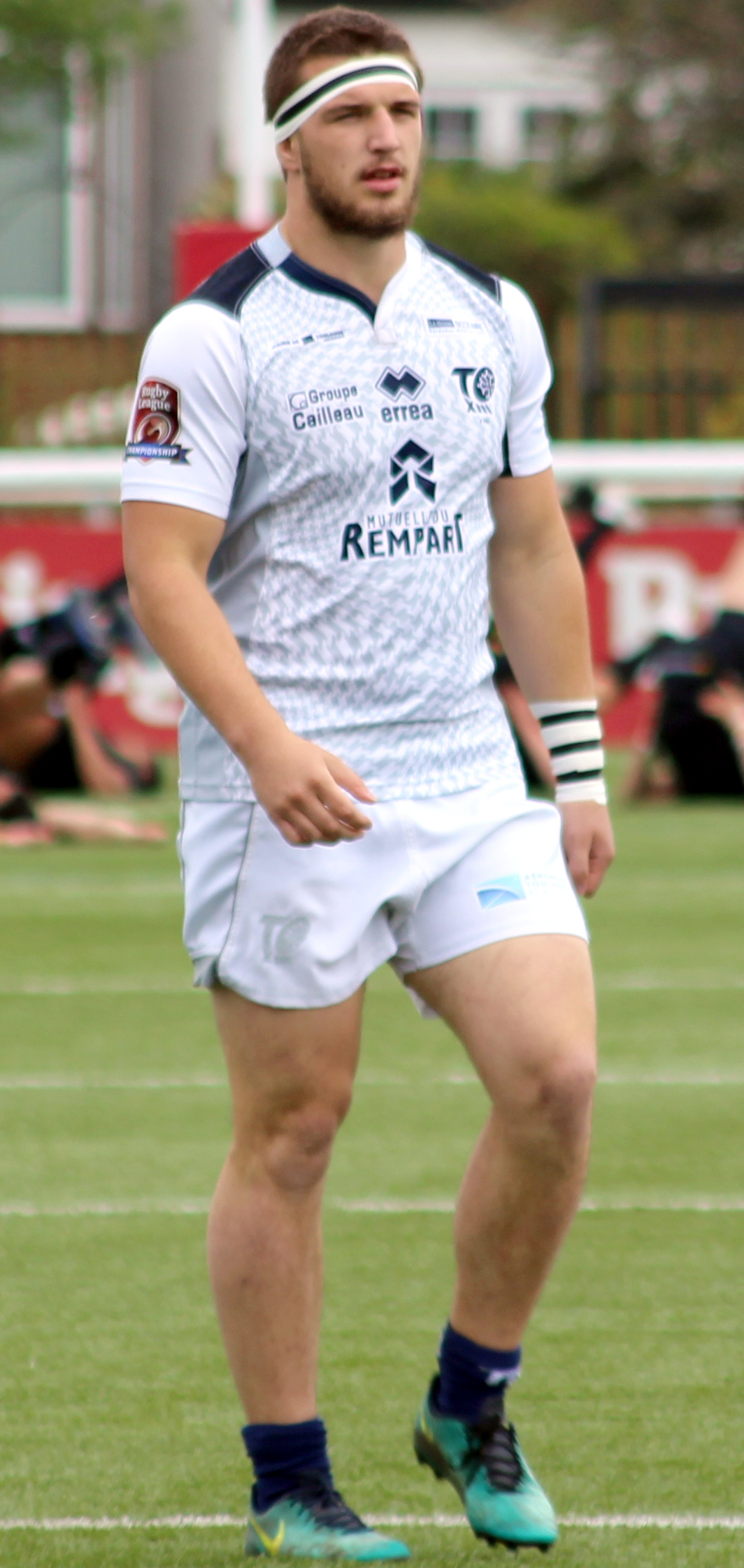

Personal information
- Born: 27 July 1994 (age 32) Tarn, France
- Height: 6 ft 0 in (1.83 m)
- Weight: 16 st 4 lb (103 kg)

Playing information
- Position: Prop, Second-row
Club
Years	Team	Pld	T	G	FG	P
2012–15	Toulouse Olympique	38	7	0	0	28
2015–15	Halifax	2	0	0	0	0
2015–15	Racing Club Albi XIII	1	0	0	0	0
2016–21	Toulouse Olympique	145	22	0	0	88
2016(DR)–21	→Toulouse Olympique Broncos	18	2	0	0	8
2021–	AS Carcassonne	17	4	0	0	16
2024(loan)	→Halifax Panthers	0	0	0	0	0
	Total	221	35	0	0	140
Representative
Years	Team	Pld	T	G	FG	P
2014–24	France	3	1	0	0	4
- Source: As of 27 October 2024

Clément Boyer (born 27 July 1994) is a French professional rugby league footballer who plays as a prop or second-row forward for AS Carcassonne in the Super XIII. He also had brief spells with Halifax Panthers and Albi.

== Background ==
Boyer was born in Tarn, France.

== Club career ==
=== Toulouse Olympique ===
Boyer made his Toulouse debut on 14 October 2012 in a 42-16 win at Villeneuve in Elite 1. He went on to make 163 appearances for Toulouse for both the first team (in England and France) and for the Toulouse Olympique Broncos in Elite 1. He scored 24 tries. His last appearance came on 15 May 2021 in the 20-12 defeat at home to AS Carcassonne in Elite 1.

In 2016, he was nominated for the Kingstone Press League 1 Young Player of the Year.

On 20 August 2020, Toulouse announced that Boyer's contract with the first team would not be renewed. However, it was not the end of the TO connection for Boyer, as he joined the reserve side Toulouse Olympique Broncos in Elite 1 for 2020/21 and made one more appearance for the first team in 2021, coming off the bench in the 44-34 win at Halifax on 25 April.

=== Halifax ===
Boyer joined Halifax from Toulouse in July 2015 and played two matches for them in the 2015 RFL Championship before returning to France.

=== Albi ===
He played three matches for Albi at the start of the 2015/16 season.

=== Carcassonne ===
Boyer joined Carcassonne for the 2021/22 season upon his release from Toulouse. In November 2021, he announced that he had engaged an Australian agent to try and secure him a club in the Australian lower leagues for 2022.

=== Halifax Panthers ===
On 8 Jun 2024 it was reported that he had signed for Halifax Panthers in the RFL Championship

== International career ==
Boyer is a French international.
