= Côte Basque XIII =

Defunct French rugby league club

Club information
- Founded: 1934; 91 years ago
- Exited: 1958; 67 years ago

Former details
- Competition: French rugby league championship

Côte Basque XIII (lit. 'Basque Coast XIII'), also known by the Basque name Euskal kostaldea XIII, was a French rugby league football team representing the Biarritz–Anglet–Bayonne agglomeration, which is part of the administrative department of Pyrénées-Atlantiques (then called Basses-Pyrénées), and the cultural region of the French Basque Country. It was active for most of the period between 1934 and 1958.

== History ==
Côte Basque XIII was founded on 16 août 1934 by Dr. Dejeant, who also served as its first president. One month later on 16 September 1934, it played its first official game at Roanne, which finished in a 31–13 loss. Like many rugby league clubs, especially in France, Côte Basque XIII struggled to find a local ground due to the influence of rugby union authorities, who were ardently opposed to the new code. As a result, it played its early "home" games at Stade Bourbaki in Pau. A fitting location was eventually found in downtown Anglet, where a purpose-built venue, named Stade Saint-Jean after the surrounding neighbourhood, opened in early 1935.

The Rugby Football League, which actively supported the code's early development in France, arranged for Welsh international Tommy Parker to coach and play for the team between late 1934 and 1937. Côte Basque was one of the better teams in the country during the game's pioneer years, culminating in a Coupe de France (Lord Derby Cup) win in 1936. The club had a brief brush with the French Rugby League in early 1938, threatening to withdraw from competition due to a decision by the governing body that impacted the eligibility of one of their players, but cooler heads soon prevailed.

In 1940, the sport of rugby league was banned for professionalism by the Vichy government at the request of rugby union authorities, and the team suspended operations. After the liberation, it resumed its activities, but now played out of Parc des sports Saint-Léon (today Stade Jean-Dauger), in neighbouring Bayonne. Pushed by financial escalation within the league, Côte Basque XIII merged its men's team with Bordeaux XIII for the 1946–47 and 1947–48 seasons. In 1948, the club quit its partnership with Bordeaux, as the rugby union section of multisports club Société Nautique de Bayonne crossed over to league and fused with Côte Basque XIII to form the new Nautique XIII.

In 1954, Nautique XIII merged with the embattled rugby league section of Biarritz Athletic Club, which was on the losing side of a conflict with rugby union's Biarritz Olympique. The resulting organization took the name Côte Basque again. In 1958, harmstrung by insufficient financial resources, the club closed its doors. An attempt was made to revive the organization in 1977, but according to a specialized rugby league Who's Who released by French publisher L'Ixcéa, the project was "quickly snuffed out".

== Notable personnel ==
- Tommy Parker

== Honours ==
- Lord Derby Cup (1): 1936
