= Saint-Gaudens =

Saint-Gaudens, Saint Gaudens, and St. Gaudens may refer to:

== Places ==
- Arrondissement of Saint-Gaudens, an arrondissement (district) of France
- Saint-Gaudens, Haute-Garonne, a commune in the Haute-Garonne department in southwestern France
- Saint-Gaudens National Historic Site, the home, gardens, and studios of Augustus Saint-Gaudens in Cornish, New Hampshire

== People ==
- Augustus Saint-Gaudens (1848-1907), an Irish-born American sculptor
- Louis St. Gaudens (1854-1913), an American sculptor and brother of Augustus
- Homer Saint-Gaudens (1880-1958), American academic and son of Augustus

== Other uses ==
- Open Saint-Gaudens Occitanie, a tennis tournament in Saint-Gaudens, Haute-Garonne
- Saint-Gaudens Bears, a French rugby league team
- St. Gaudens Double Eagle, a twenty dollar gold coin designed by Augustus Saint-Gaudens
