= Corentin Le Cam =

France international rugby league footballer

Personal information
- Full name: Corentin Le Cam
- Born: 8 June 1999 (age 26) Perpignan, Pyrénées-Orientales, Occitania, France
- Height: 6 ft 10 in (2.08 m)
- Weight: 18 st 8 lb (118 kg)

Playing information

Rugby league
- Position: Prop, Second-row, Loose forward
Club
Years	Team	Pld	T	G	FG	P
2021–22	Catalans Dragons	11	0	0	0	0
2022(loan)	→ Whitehaven RLFC	2	1	0	0	4
2023	Catalans Dragons	1	0	0	0	0
2023(DR)	→ St Estève	10	5	0	0	0
	Total	24	6	0	0	4
Representative
Years	Team	Pld	T	G	FG	P
2022	France	6	5	0	0	4

Rugby union
Club
Years	Team	Pld	T	G	FG	P
2022–23	Céret Sportif Vallespir	3	0	0	0	0
- Source: As of 27 July 2023

Corentin Le Cam (born 8 June 1999) is a French rugby league & rugby union footballer who plays as second-row forward for RC Albi XIII in the Super XIII. He previously played for Catalans Dragons in the Super League and France at international level.

He is the tallest man ever to play English Super League at 209 cm.

Corentin scored a try against England in the end of year test against England.

He was “one of the players to watch” for France in the delayed 2021 Rugby League World Cup.

In 2021 he made his Catalans debut in the Super League against St Helens.
