= Stade Chapou =

Stadium in Toulouse, France

- Stade Chapou
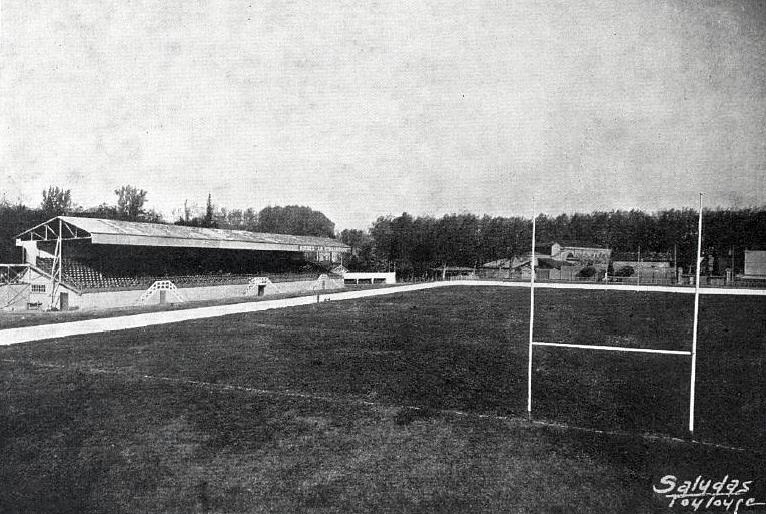
- Stade Chapou in 1934
- Interactive map of Stade Chapou
- Address: Rue des Amidonniers, 31000 Toulouse; Toulouse; France
- Coordinates: 43°36′31″N 1°25′9″E
- Capacity: 15 000
- Type: Association football and athletics stadium

Construction
- Opened: 1908
- Renovated: 1922
- Demolished: 1965

Tenants
- Toulouse olympique employés club (1912–1965); Toulouse FC (1937–1949)

Le Stade Chapou (or Stade Jacques-Chapou) was a stadium that was located on rue des Amidonniers in Toulouse. It was called Stade du T.O.E.C. before World War II, then Stade du Général Huntziger during the war, then Stade Chapou after the war (in tribute to Jacques Chapou (1909-1944), French Resistant).

The stadium was destroyed in 1965 for building a residence of students for the faculty.

== 1938 FIFA World Cup ==
The Stade du T.O.E.C. in the old Parc des Sports was one of the venues of the 1938 FIFA World Cup, and held the following matches (initially planned to the new stadium of the new Parc des Sports):

Date	Team #1	Res.	Team #2	Round	Attendance
5 June 1938	Cuba	3–3	Romania	First round	7,000
9 June 1938	Cuba	2–1	Romania	First round replay	8,000
