= Stade Albert Domec =

Municipal stadium

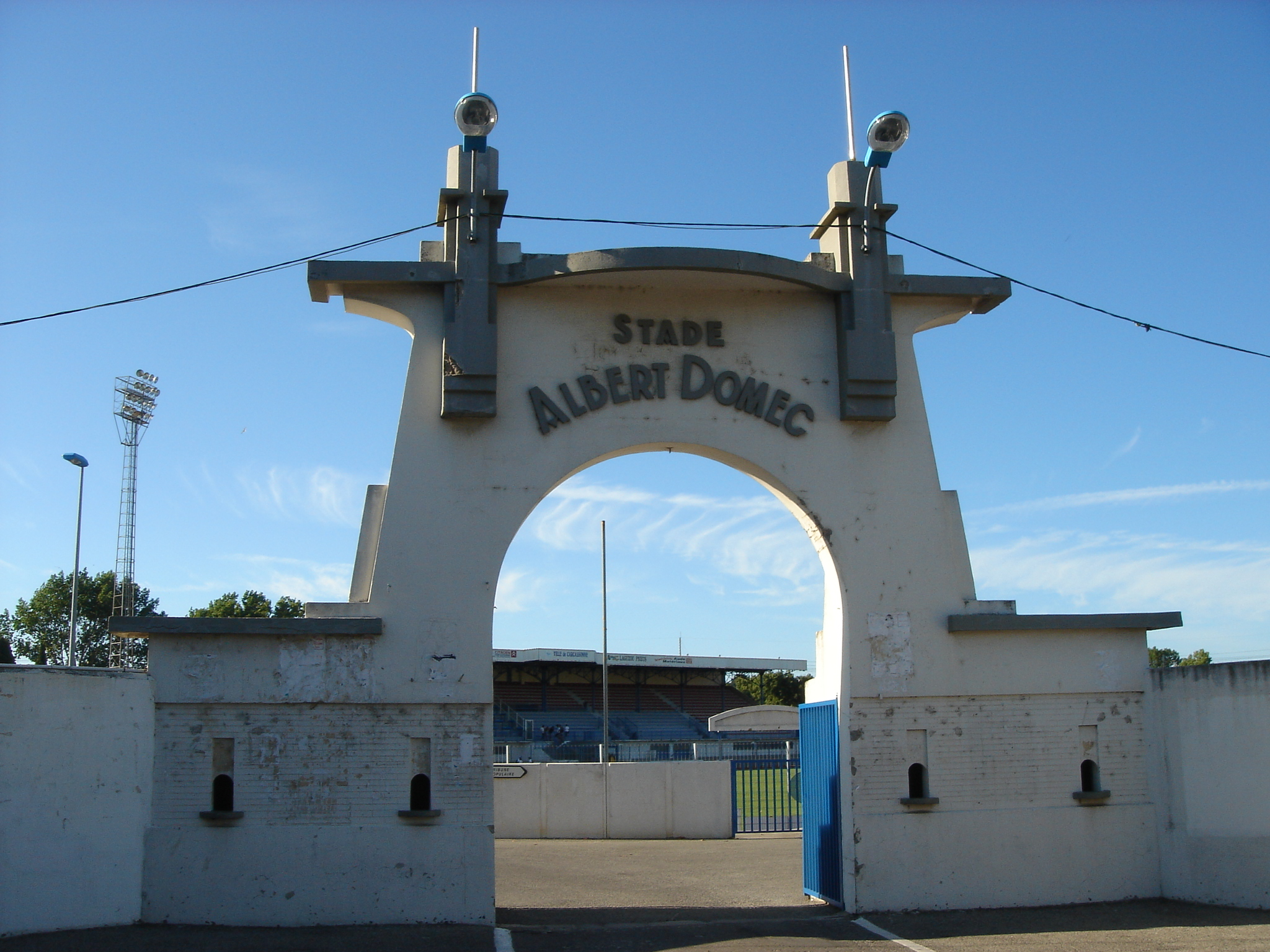
- The entrance to Stade Albert Domec
- Interactive map of Stade Albert Domec
- Full name: Stade Albert Domec
- Former names: Stade de la Pépinière (1899-1948)
- Location: Carcassonne, France
- Coordinates: 43°13′4″N 2°21′52″E
- Capacity: 10,000
- Surface: Grass
- Record attendance: 23,500

Construction
- Built: 1899
- Opened: 1899
- Renovated: 2002, 2012

Tenants
- AS Carcassonne; US Carcassonne

Stade Albert Domec is a multi-use municipal stadium in Carcassonne, France. It has a capacity of 10,000 spectators. It is the home ground of Pro D2 rugby union club Union Sportive Carcassonnaise and Elite One Championship rugby league club Association Sportive de Carcassonne XIII. It is also used by the association football club Football Agglomération Carcassonne for their big matches. Built in 1899, it is one of the oldest stadiums in France, and was renovated in 2002, and again in 2012 when US Carcassonne entered the Pro D2. The stadium is named after the French rugby union player Albert Domec, who died 20 September 1948, and who represented France in 1939. The stadium is also equipped for athletics and has an eight lane 400m track.

The stadium has been used in Rugby League World Cups. The ground has hosted many French rugby league championship and cup finals as well as French rugby league internationals, the first being in 1967 when Great Britain national rugby league team won 16–13 in front of 10,650 spectators

== History ==
Formerly called 'le stade de la Pepiniere' the ground was built and opened in 1899 and sits within the medieval castle walls of the city. In 1919 the rugby club paid 95,000 francs for the site then sold it to the local council a year later. The council built the two main stands that run along the length of the pitch each able to hold 3,000 spectators, floodlights and a cycle track were also installed. The stadium has been renovated twice since in 2002 and in 2012. The ground is named after the former US Carcassonne and French rugby union international player Albert Domec who played as a centre during the 1920s and 1930s. The stadium has a bronze statue of AS Carcassonne's most famous player, former captain of the French national rugby league team, Puig Aubert at its entrance. The record attendance at the ground is 23,500 for the French rugby league championship final in 1949 between AS Carcassonne and Marseille XIII.

== International Rugby League Matches ==
Date	Teams	Score	Attendance	Competition
22 January 1967	France v Great Britain	13-16	10,650	Test Match
24 December 1967	France v Australia	10-3	4,193	1967-68 Kangaroo tour of Great Britain and France
21 November 1971	France v New Zealand	2-24	7,200	1971 New Zealand rugby league tour of Great Britain and France
20 March 1977	France v England	28-15	12,000	1977 European Rugby League Championship
26 November 1978	France v Australia	13-10	7,000	1978 Kangaroo tour of Great Britain and France
28 October 1979	France v Papua New Guinea	15-2	3,500	Test Match
20 February 1983	France v Great Britain	5-20	3,826	Test Match
13 December 1986	France v Australia	0-52	5,000	1985-1988 Rugby League World Cup
8 February 1987	France v Great Britain	10-20	2,000	Test Match
15 November 1987	France v Papua New Guinea	21-4	5,000	1985-1988 Rugby League World Cup
19 November 1989	France v New Zealand	14-16	3,500	1989 New Zealand rugby league tour of Great Britain and France
3 December 1989	France v New Zealand	0-34	4,208	1989-1992 Rugby League World Cup
24 November 1991	France v Papua New Guinea	28-14	1,440	1989-1992 Rugby League World Cup
7 March 1993	France v Great Britain	6-48	5,500	Test Match
21 November 1993	France v New Zealand	11-36	3,500	1993 New Zealand rugby league tour of Great Britain and France
20 March 1994	France v Great Britain	4-12	7,000	Test Match
5 March 1995	France v Wales	10-22	6,000	1995 European Rugby League Championship
5 June 1996	France v Wales	14-34	4,300	1996 European Rugby League Championship
13 October 1999	France v England	20-28	3,000	Friendly
1 November 2000	France v Tonga	28-8	10,288	2000 Rugby League World Cup
25 October 2003	France v Australia	10-34	7,813	2003 Kangaroo tour of Great Britain and France
11 November 2004	France v New Zealand	20-24	8,000	Friendly
5 November 2005	France v Wales	38-16	3,000	2005 European Nations Cup

== Representative Rugby League Matches ==
Date	Teams	Score	Attendance	Competition
2 January 1949	AS Carcassonne v Australia	8-13	7,990	1948-49 Kangaroo tour of Great Britain and France
4 January 1953	AS Carcassonne v Australia	5-18	4,881	1952-53 Kangaroo tour of Great Britain and France
26 December 1956	AS Carcassonne v Australia	12-26	3,493	1956-57 Kangaroo tour of Great Britain and France
31 December 1959	Carcassonne/Lézignan Sangliers v Australia	32-9	6,364	1959-60 Kangaroo tour of Great Britain and France
1 November 1962	France v Eastern Division	16-23	4,920	Tour Match
29 December 1963	Languedoc v Australia	12-16	6,143	1963-64 Kangaroo tour of Great Britain and France
5 December 1990	Languedoc-Rousillon v Australia	9-38	600	1990 Kangaroo tour of Great Britain and France
May 2015	France u18 v England u18	30-28		Friendly

== French Rugby League Championship Finals (Elite 1) ==
Season	Winners	Score	Runner-up	Attendance
1948-49	Marseille XIII	12-5	AS Carcassonne	23,500
2008-09	Lézignan Sangliers	40-32	Limoux Grizzlies	11,263

== Lord Derby Cup Finals ==
Season	Winners	Score	Runner-up	Attendance
1949-50	XIII Catalan	12-5	Lyon Villeurbanne	13,500
1956-57	Marseille XIII	11-0	XIII Catalan	16,633
1958-59	XIII Catalan	7-0	SO Avignon	11,000
1965-66	Lézignan Sangliers	22-7	US Villeneuve	10,067
1972-73	RC Saint-Gaudens	22-8	AS Carcassonne	10,300
1990-91	RC Saint-Gaudens	30-4	Pia XIII	6,000
1993-94	AS Saint Esteve	14-12	XIII Catalan	
1996-97	XIII Catalan	25-24	Limoux Grizzlies	8,000
1997-98	AS Saint Esteve	38-0	SO Avignon	7,000
2001-02	Villeneuve Leopards	27-18	Pia XIII	8,500
2002-03	Villeneuve Leopards	16-14	Pia XIII	7,000
2003-04	Union Treiziste Catalane	36-24	AS Carcassonne	10,500
2004-05	Union Treiziste Catalane	31-12	Limoux Grizzlies	11,000
2005-06	Pia XIII	36-20	Lézignan Sangliers	9,344
2006-07	Pia XIII	30-14	AS Carcassonne	5,500
2007-08	Limoux Grizzlies	17-14	RC Albi	9,000
2010-11	Lézignan Sangliers	27-18	Pia XIII	5,350
2012-13	SO Avignon	38-37	Limoux Grizzlies	5,000
2013-14	Toulouse Olympique	46-10	AS Carcassonne	6,763
2014-15	Lézignan Sangliers	27-25	Saint-Esteve XIII Catalan	4,124
2015-16	Saint-Esteve XIII Catalan	33-16	Limoux Grizzlies	4,200

== See also ==
- List of rugby league stadiums by capacity
- List of rugby union stadiums by capacity
