= Stade Jules Ribet =

Rugby stadium in Saint-Gaudens, France

- Interactive map of Stade Jules Ribet
- Full name: Stade Jules Ribet
- Location: 69 Avenue de l'Isle, 31800 Saint-Gaudens, France
- Coordinates: 43°07′02″N 0°43′37″E
- Owner: Mairie Saint-Gaudens (Saint-Gaudens town council)
- Capacity: 5,000 (2,000 seated)
- Surface: Grass

Construction
- Built: 1898
- Opened: 1898

Tenant
- Saint-Gaudens Bears (1958-)

The Stade Jules Ribet is a rugby stadium in Saint-Gaudens in France. It is the current home ground of Super XIII side Saint-Gaudens Bears. The current capacity is 5,000 with 2,000 seated.

== History ==
Rugby has been played on the site since 1898. When in 1958 a new rugby league club was formed this was the obvious venue for the club. The ground currently has one main stand which seats 2,000 spectators. The ground has also hosted the touring Australia national rugby league team during the 1960s, and more recently in 2011. In 2002 the rugby league Challenge Cup came to town when Saint-Gaudens Bears hosted English side Halifax losing the game 26–48 in front of a crowd of 3,200

== Representative Rugby League Matches ==
Date	Teams	Score	Attendance	Game
19 December 1963	Pyrenees XIII v Australia	10-14	2,059	1963-64 Kangaroo tour of Great Britain and France
4 January 1968	South West France XIII v Australia	0-15	1,205	1967-68 Kangaroo tour of Great Britain and France
23 November 2011	France u19 v Australia u19	12-40	2,000	International

On February 27, 2015, it hosted a Six Nations Under 20s Championship match between France and Wales with France winning 27 - 5.
