= Saint-Gaudens Bears =

French professional rugby league club

Club information
- Full name: Racing Club Saint-Gaudens XIII
- Nickname: Les Ours
- Founded: 1958; 68 years ago
- Website: Official site

Current details
- Ground: Stade Jules Ribet (5,000)
- Chairman: Anthony Geyzes, Dominique Berre
- Coach: Joseph Besgrove
- Competition: Super XIII
- 2024–25: 9th

Uniforms
Home colours	Away colours

The Saint-Gaudens Bears are a professional rugby league club based in the town of Saint-Gaudens, in the Haute-Garonne region of south-western France. They play in the Super XIII. The club was formed in 1958. They have won the French rugby league championship on four occasions and lifted the Lord Derby Cup three times. Their home ground is the Stade Jules Ribet.

== History ==
The club was founded in 1958 as Racing Club Saint-Gaudinois Comminges XIII. It was during the 1960s and early 1970s that they enjoyed their best spell. Having been runners up in the league on four occasions 1963, 66, 67 and 69 they finally won it in 1970 when they beat the favourites XIII Catalan 33–10. Two more runners up spots in 1971 and 72 showed that they were consistent if not successful. In 1973 they lifted the cup in their first appearance in the final, beating AS Carcassonne on their own ground 22–8. The following season brought more silverware when they won the title again. There then followed a lean period, in fact it would be 27 years before any more success occurred but in that season of 1990-91 they registered a league and cup double. In the cup they beat Pia XIII 30-4 and the league was won thanks to a 10–8 win against US Villeneuve. They retained the cup the following season beating RC Carpentras 22–10 in the final. The league title was won again in 2004 a year after finishing runner up. The 2004 final in Perpignan was won against Union Treiziste Catalane 14–10. A steady decline began after this and the club finished bottom of the league in both 2009 and 2010 escaping relegation but in 2011 the club was relegated to the Elite Two Championship After five seasons in the 2nd tier they were promoted back to the top division when the league was increased.

== Stadium ==
The club have always played at the Stade Jules Ribet. Rugby had been played at the venue since 1898, it currently has a main stand that seats 2,000 with a total capacity of 5,000. On 23 November 2011 the ground hosted an under 19 game between France and the touring Australians the visitors winning 40-12

== Current squad ==
Squad for the 2026-2027 Super XIII season.

- (France) Matthieu Bassin (Wing)
- (France) Joris Beranger (Second-row)
- (France) Kylian Bernoville (Hooker)
- (England) Joe Bretherton (Prop)
- (France) Alexandre Caparros (Prop)
- (France) Valentin Dumas (Halfback)
- (France) Mathis Ferreol-Bezolles
- (France) Mathias Formosa (Prop)
- (Australia) Jake Goodwin (Prop)
- (France) Bastien Gorka (Prop)
- (Australia) Kade Hill (Halfback)
- (France) Jeremy Ruffie (Wing)
- (France) Ronan Skandine (Prop)
- (New Caledonia) Atonio Tokotu'u (Prop)
- (France) Tom Vadillo (Centre)
- (Fiji) Jale Vatubua (Centre)
- (France) Jules Vigneau (Second-row)
- (Australia) Brad Wall (Five-eighth)
- (Australia) Liam Wiscombe (Prop)

== Honours ==
- French Rugby League Championship (4): 1969–70, 1973–74, 1990–91, 2003-4
- Lord Derby Cup (3): 1973, 1991, 1992
