= Racing Club Albi XIII =

French semi-professional rugby league club

Albi Rugby League

Club information
- Nickname: The Tigers
- Founded: 1934; 92 years ago
- Website: Official website

Current details
- Ground: Stade Mazicou (5,000)
- Coach: Tony Gigot Ben Shea
- Competition: Super XIII
- 2024-25: 1st

Uniforms
Home colours

Albi Rugby League XIII originally called Racing Club Albigeois XIII and more recently also known as RC Albi XIII are a semi-professional rugby league team based in Albi in the Occitanie region in southern France. Formed in 1934 the club compete in the Super XIII the highest level of competition in France. They have won the French title on six occasions and the Lord Derby Cup once. Their current home stadium is Stade Mazicou.

== History ==
Racing Club Albigeois XIII were one of the founder clubs of rugby league in France indeed they were the second club formed after US Villeneuve in May 1934. They were formed by Jean-Marie Vignal one of Jean Galia's pioneers who would be the club's first captain/coach and Simon Bompunt who would be the club's first chairman. Initially the club recruited from nearby Toulouse as the local Rugby Union club SC Albi refused players to move to the new club, only two would move in the early years. The club finished 7th in their debut season their first ever match finishing in a 6–26 defeat at Bordeaux XIII

In season 1937-38 despite finishing 7th the club won through the play-offs to reach the final and then caused a major upset, beating US Villeneuve 8–3 to lift their first trophy. They reached the semi-final in 1939–40 in what would be the last championship before war broke out. During the war the Vichy Government banned Rugby League in France and the club were forced to join with the rugby union club in the town SC Albi under a new name Albi Olympique. After the war the club went back to Rugby League, they enjoyed a good spell at the end of the 1950s as they won the French rugby league championship three times in six years. They also hosted the touring Australia national rugby league team, losing 22–31 in 1952 and 20–25 in 1956, but in 1959 they earned a 19–10 win against them in front of 5,845 spectators.

The club won the Lord Derby Cup in 1974 and won the league championship for a fifth time in 1977.

The club withdrew from the Elite One Championship at the end of the 2007–08 season due to financial reasons but in 2014–15 they won the Elite Two Championship and returned to the top flight finishing a creditable 5th in 2015–16.

In the 2024–25 season, Albi won the Super XIII title by defeating AS Carcassone 26–16 in the final.

The club currently runs youth sides and a ladies team.

== Colours and Badge ==
The club have always played in amber and black. The Badge has been changed originally it was a French cockerel stood on a rugby ball with the number 13 on the ball. This was changed to a tiger next to a tower logo before the current one was used. The reference to 'Tigers' comes from the 90s when they followed many other clubs in adopting a moniker, possibly along the lines of Castleford Tigers who happen to play in the same colours

== Stadium ==
They club are currently based at Stade Mazicou.

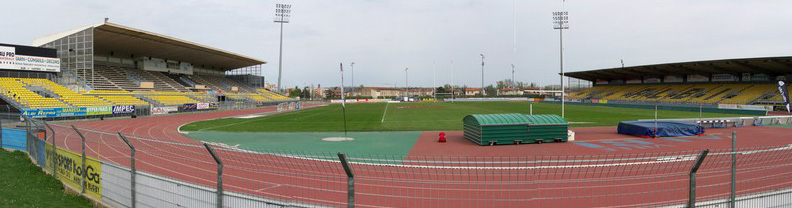
Stadium Municipal d'Albi

They were previously based at the Stadium Municipal d'Albi which had been the club's home ground since it opened for rugby in 1964. The main stand is a cantilever grandstand while opposite is newer stand both these stands are all seated, at either end there is terracing. In 1977 the French rugby league championship was held here despite RC Albi being in the final against AS Carcassonne. A record rugby crowd of 20,000 witnessed an Albi win, their last to date. In 1979 France national rugby league team beat the touring Papua New Guinea national rugby league team 16–9. The stadium underwent a major revamp in 2007 resulting in the now 13,058 capacity including 8,000 seated.

== Current squad ==
Squad for the 2026-27 Super XIII season.

- (France) Yannis Ballet (Lock)
- (France) Ilan Boualem (Halfback)
- (France) Robin Brochon (Centre)
- (France) Paul Clergue (Wing)
- (France) Thibault Correges (Hooker)
- (France) Enzo Delbe (Lock)
- (France) Tristan Dupuy (Second-row)
- (Australia) Matt Frawley (Five-eighth)
- (Malta) Josh Gatt (Second-row
- (France) Jayson Goffin (Second-row)
- (France) Camille Jarreau (Lock)
- (France) Theo Lardot (Prop)
- (France) Corentin Le Cam (Second-row)
- (France) Mathias Leveille (Prop)
- (France) Mathieu Liauzun (Hooker)
- (France) Pierre-Jean Lima (Second-row)
- (France) Nittim Pedrero (Wing)
- (France) Noah Phalp (Hooker)
- (France) Maxime Puech (Prop)
- (France) Axel Rodrigues (Prop)
- (France) Maxime Rostang (Halfback)
- (France) Adrien Salies-Bardes (Centre)
- (Australia) Matt Soper-Lawler (Wing)
- (New Zealand) Dredin Sorensen McGee (Centre)
- (France) Clement Tailhades (Centre)
- (France) Louis Tailhades (Prop)
- (France) Fouad Yaha (Centre)

== Honours ==
- French Championship / Super XIII (6): 1937–38, 1955–56, 1957–58, 1961–62, 1976–77, 2024–25
- Elite 2 (2): 1990–91, 2014–15
- Lord Derby Cup (1): 1973-74
