= AS Carcassonne =

French semi-professional rugby league club

Club information
- Full name: Association Sportive de Carcassonne XIII
- Nickname: Canaries
- Founded: 1938; 88 years ago
- Website: Official site

Current details
- Ground: Stade Albert Domec (10,000)
- CEO: Jean Guilhem Nathalie Bardou
- Chairman: Jerome Escourrou
- Coach: Frederic Camel
- Manager: Jean-Francois Albert
- Competition: Super XIII
- 2024–25: 2nd

Uniforms
Home colours

Association Sportive of Carcassonne are a semi-professional rugby league football club based in Carcassonne in the region of Occitanie in the south of France. They play in the French Super XIII and are one of the most successful clubs in French rugby league, having won a total of twelve French rugby league championship titles and eighteen Lord Derby Cups.

The club was founded in 1938 and to date has produced debatably the best ever French Rugby league footballer in Puig Aubert. The club plays its home matches at the Stade Albert Domec.

The club runs both youth teams and a ladies' team.

== History ==
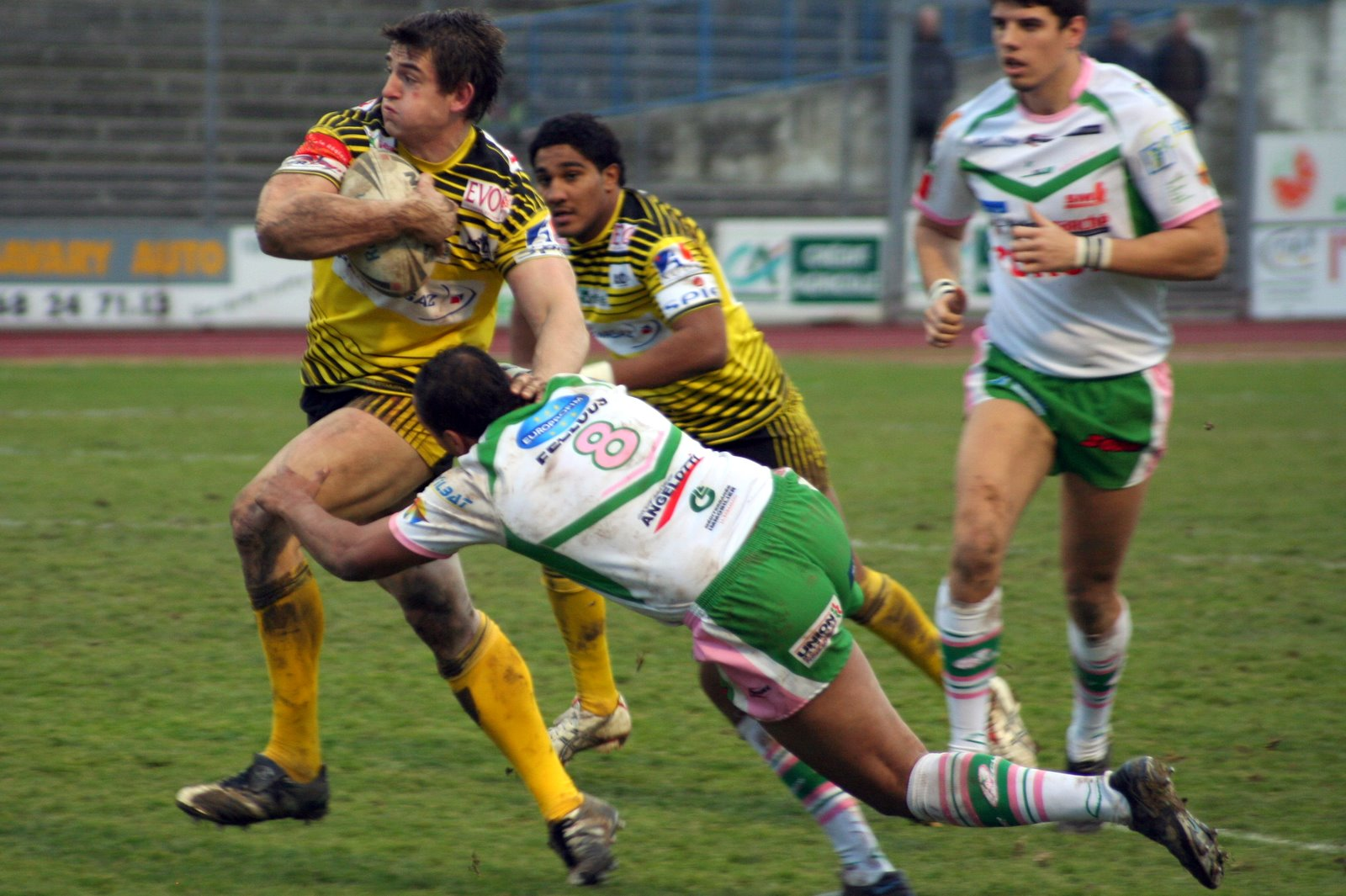
Teddy Sadaoui and Amar Sabri playing for Carcassonne in a match against Lezignan (January 2010).

As early as 1899 rugby was introduced to the rich and well off in Carcassonne. The club reached the rugby championship final in 1925, then in 1930 along with 11 other clubs they broke away from the French rugby union and began their own competition. With the creation of the French rugby league championship in 1934 several rugby league clubs began springing up throughout the France. It was not until May 1938 though that AS Carcassonne would join. Their debut season saw them finish 3rd before losing in the semi-finals to US Villeneuve. The following season they reached the cup semi-final, but before it could be played war broke out and the season was ended.

The French Vichy government placed a ban on rugby league as of 19 December 1941.

After the war AS Carcassonne returned to rugby league under the direction of Paul Barriere. Several new players joined the club, most notably nineteen-year-old Puig Aubert; this influx of players would signal both new ambition and success for the club who would go on to win five Championship titles over the next ten years coupled with four Lord Derby Cups.

With the completion of the golden years in early 1950s the club went through a somewhat lean period where silverware would evade them for several years until the early 1960s when the club would have a semi-return to their glory days winning back to back Lord Derby Cups and another four French Championships between 1966 and 1976.

Since the completion of the 1977 season the club's fortunes took something of a slide by their standards. The club managed only a single French Championship in 1992 and two Lord Derby Cups in 1983 and 1990. In seasons 1992–93 and 1993–94 they competed in the British cup competition the Regal Trophy losing in the opening round on both occasions firstly to Wigan 0-52, and then Carlisle 24-36 the following season.

The new millennium didn't bring too much silverware either but having been runner up in the cup in 2004 and 2007 they lifted the trophy again in 2009. 2012 was a memorable campaign that ended with them completing a league and cup double beating Pia XIII in both finals. The reward for winning the title was a place in the British rugby league Challenge Cup in 2013, they lost 16–24 away at Workington Town. Runners up in 2014 v Toulouse Olympique in the cup and a year later they were runners up again this time in the league against the same opponents. Season 2016-17 saw them win the Lord Derby Cup for a record 14th time after beating Lezignan Sangliers 30–24. In 2023 Carcassonne added a sixteenth Lord Derby Cup by beating Albi in Perpignan.

In December 2023, the club submitted an application to join the British rugby league system starting in League 1 from 2026.

== AS Carcassonne v Australia ==
Date	Score	Attendance
2 January 1949	8-13	7,990
4 January 1953	5-18	4,881
26 December 1956	12-26	3,493

== Colours and badge ==
The crest for AS Carcassonne originated when the club decided to design itself a badge that was unique and represented the Carcassonne area. It was subsequently decided to have the city's main feature of the castle-like fortified city appear on the crest, a decision that has proven popular and remains until this day.

== Stadium ==
Stade Albert Domec originally called 'le stade de la Pepiniere' was built in 1899 the ground sits within the medieval castle walls. When the rugby club sold it to the local council in 1919 they set about work on the ground. Two new stands which are still in use were built, each holding 3,000 spectators, along with some floodlights. The ground is named after a former player of AS Carcassonne and a former French international. The grounds current capacity is 10,000 well below the record attendance OF 23,500 set on 22 May 1949 when it hosted the French rugby league championship Final between AS Carcassonne and Marseille XIII.

== Current squad ==
Squad for the 2026-27 Super XIII season.

- (New Zealand) Jack Aiken (Centre)
- (France) Alexis Alberola (Hooker)
- (France) Lucas Albert (Halfback)
- (France) Vincent Albert (Centre)
- (France) Julien Ballarin (Second-row)
- (France) Maxime Belondrade (Hooker)
- (France) Diego Berail-Torres (Halfback)
- (France) Thomas Boully (Centre)
- (France) Clement Boyer (Prop)
- (Australia) Jack Boyling (Second-row)
- (France) Bastien Canet (Second-row)
- (France) Djibryl Dauliac (Hooker)
- (France) Jowasa Drodrolagi (Prop)
- (France) Alexis Escamilla (Wing)
- (France) Bastien Escamilla (Prop)
- (France) Paul Galy (Prop)
- (France) Georgy Gambaro (Wing)
- (France) Clement Herrero (Five-eighth)
- (France) Yanis Hettat (Prop)
- (France) Nolan Lopez-Buttignol (Hooker)
- (France) Thomas Malfaz (Lock)
- (France) Germain Rigaud (Wing)
- (France) Lucas Rodriguez (Prop)
- (France) Paul Seguier (Second-row)
- (Fiji) Maika Serulevu (Second-row)

== Notable players ==
- Puig Aubert: The most notable player to come from the Carcassonne club, Aubert captained both AS Carcassonne and the French national side to glory on many occasions throughout his illustrious career. Originally signed to the club in the 1944 season and would become a vital part of the club's glory years from 1945 to 1953 where the club would go on to win five Championships in nine years. After his professional retirement in the early-1960s Aubert would end up residing in Carcassonne where he eventually would die on 3 June 1994 of a heart attack. Later that year the club would honour Aubert with a statue at the ground that he played at for the majority of his career.
- Jean Barthe/Gilbert Benausse/Édouard Ponsinet: Three other famous French internationals from the all conquering France side of the 1950s.
- Clément Soubeyras/Teddy Sadaoui/Younes Khattabi: The three most recent French international players to come from the AS Carcassonne club.

== Honours ==
- French Rugby League Championship / Elite One Championship (13)

1944–45, 1945–46, 1949–50, 1951–52, 1952–53, 1965–66, 1966–67, 1971–72, 1975–76, 1991–92, 2011–12, 2021–22, 2023–24

- Lord Derby Cup (18)

1946, 1947, 1951, 1952, 1961, 1963, 1967, 1968, 1977, 1983, 1990, 2009, 2012, 2017, 2019, 2023, 2024, 2026.
