= Toulouse Olympique Broncos =

French semi-professional rugby league club

Toulouse Olympique Elite

Club information
- Full name: Toulouse Olympique Elite
- Nickname: Broncos
- Founded: 1980; 46 years ago
- Website: Website

Current details
- Ground: Stade Philippe Struxiano (1980-2014), Stade des Minimes (2014-) (4,066)
- Chairman: Jean-Lou Pecetto
- Coach: Sébastien Raguin
- Competition: Super XIII
- 2024–25: 11th

Uniforms
Home colours	Away colours

Toulouse Olympique Elite are a semi-professional rugby league team based in Toulouse in the south-west of France. Formerly called Toulouse Jules-Julien Broncos XIII, the club changed its name at the end of the 2011-12 season after being taken over by Toulouse Olympique becoming known as Toulouse Olympique Broncos until the end of the 2016–17 season. Formed in 1980, they currently play in the Super XIII

== History ==
Founded in 1980 as Association Sportive Toulouse Jules-Julien XIII the club joined the amateur ranks in rugby league. In 1987 a youth academy was set up running teams from 4 years and up. The club was promoted in 1994 after winning the National Division 2 title. During the following season the club, after getting into financial trouble, had to withdraw from the league. It wasn't until 2010 that a senior side reappeared, they were created to compete in the Elite Two Championship. During this time the youth sides had still competed. Before the 2012/13 season had started, the senior side moved under the umbrella of city neighbours Toulouse Olympique changing their name to the current one used today. In 2015 following Toulouse Olympique's acceptance into the British League 1 competition, the Broncos were moved up to the Elite One Championship to replace the departing Toulouse club and to also act as their feeder team, while also maintaining a Toulouse presence in the French League. The team retained their nickname 'Broncos' with the club website using this until the end of the 2016–17 season. (Note: Articles on the French Rugby League Federation still used this name for the team until 2020.) The following season the team started being referred to as the 'Elite' or 'Elite 1' team, named after the competition they competed in.

The original club name Toulouse Jules-Julien XIII lives on to this day at the academy level with teams from ages 4 to 20.

== Colours and badge ==
Toulouse Jules-Julien badge

The original club played in predominantly red with yellow, after being taken over the club used the same colours as its parent club, blue and white. The academy sides still play in the original colours

== Stadium ==
The club's first stadium was the Stade Philippe Struxiano named after a former player from the 1920s. In 2014 they moved to their current home the Stade des Minimes or as its also known Stade Arnauné the current capacity is 4,066.

== Current squad ==
Squad for 2026-2027 Super XIII season.

- (France) Kiyam Benabbou (Lock
- (France) Florian Burgat (Second-row)
- (France) Abel Drigui (Wing)
- (France) Noa Frayssinous
- (France) Tom Guilhaumou
- (France) Stephane Guillon (Hooker)
- (France) Lucas Hangard (Centre)
- (France) Robin Hugues (Prop)
- (France) Oscar Jocelyn (Prop)
- (France) Tony Maurel (Five-eighth)
- (France) Charles Nies (Lock)
- (France) Axel Palin (Halfback
- (France) Hugo Pezet (Centre
- (France) Yoann Reynaud (Wing)
- (France) Stevy Richmond (Wing)
- (France) Nolan Sosse (Fullback)
- (France) Matteo Stefani (Centre)

== Honours ==
- National Division 2 (1): 1993-94
