= French Rugby League Federation =

Governing body for the sport of rugby league football in France

- Fédération Française de Rugby à XIII
- Founded: 6 April 1934
- Formerly named: Ligue Française de rugby à treize Federation française de jeu à treize
- IRL affiliation: 1948
- RLEF affiliation: 2003 (Full member)
- Responsibility: France
- Headquarters: 30 rue de l'Echiquier, 75010 PARIS
- Key people: Nicolas Larrat (Chair)
- Website: ffr13.fr

(France)
- As of 30 June 2009

The French Rugby League Federation (French: Fédération Française de Rugby à XIII; FFR) is the governing body for the sport of rugby league in France. The federation was formed during 1934 and since then has organised and governed the French rugby league championship, the Lord Derby Cup and all of the clubs that are contained within those organisations.

The FFR also controls the France national rugby league team organizing fixtures that they compete in, they also have a major voting position in the Rugby League International Federation where they help organise many aspects of rugby league worldwide.

Following development work by both Harry Sunderland (on behalf of the Australian Rugby League) and the Rugby Football League based in England, the Australian and Great British Test teams played an exhibition game at Stade Pershing in Paris in late December 1933. The French Rugby League was formed on 6 April 1934.

The federation was arguably at its most progressive under the presidency of Paul Barrière. Barrière was a driving force in the formation of an International Board for the sport in 1948 and the institution of a World Cup in 1954.

== See also ==
- France national rugby league team
- France women's national rugby league team
- Rugby league in France
- French rugby league championship
