= Lord Derby Cup 2018–2019 =

French rugby league football competition

2018–19 Lord Derby French Cup
- Duration: 25 November 2018 – 9 June 2019
- Number of teams: 30
- Winners: AS Carcassonne (15th title)
- Runners-up: Saint-Estève XIII Catalan

The 2018–19 Coupe de France Lord Derby was the 81st edition of the Coupe de France Lord Derby, the premier rugby league knockout competition in France. It began on 25 November 2018 and ended with the final at the Stade Gilbert Brutus on 9 June 2019.

The defending champions were Saint-Estève XIII Catalan who defeated XIII Limouxin in the 2017–18 final. In the 2018–19 competition, they reached the final but lost 22–6 to AS Carcassonne.

== Background ==
The 81st edition of the Coupe de France Lord Derby, started on 25 November 2018 and concluded with the final on 9 June 2019. The 55 teams taking part were from Elite 1 (10 teams), Elite 2 (12 teams), and the National and Federal divisions (33 teams). Only one match was played in Round 1. The majority of teams entered the competition in Round 2 and Elite 1 teams joined in Round 3. In matches between teams from different divisions, the venue was the stadium of the team from the lower division.

=== Format and dates ===
Lord Derby French Cup competition format
Round	Date	Clubs involved this round	Winners from previous round	New entries this round	Leagues entering at this round
Round 1	25 November	2	None	2	2 National/Federal Division teams
Round 2	15–16 December	44	1	43	All 12 teams from Elite 2 and 31 National/Federal Division teams
Round 3	12–13 January	32	22	10	All 10 teams from Elite 1
Round of 16	9–10 March	16	16	None	
Quarter-finals	30–31 March	8	8	None	
Semi-finals	4–5 May	4	4	None	
Final	9 June	2	2	None	

== Round 1 ==
The Round 1 tie was played on 25 November.

Round 1 fixtures
Home	Score	Away	Match Information			
Home	Score	Away	Date and Time	Venue	Referee	Report
Saluzzo	6–16	Cheval Blanc XIII	25 November			

== Round 2 ==
The draw for Round 2 was made on 17 November. One match was played on 9 December and the other ties were played over the weekend of 15–16 December.

Round 2 fixtures
Home	Score	Away	Match Information			
Home	Score	Away	Date and Time	Venue	Referee	Report
Villefranche d'Albi	14–38	Tonneins XIII	9 December			Report
AS Pomas XIII	23–48	RC Baho XIII (Note: Icons indicate clubs that competed in Elite 1 or Elite 2 this season)	15 December, 15:00			
Val d'Orbieu XIII	16–76	US Ferrals XIII	15 December, 15:00			
RC Lescure-Arthes XIII (2nd)	10–26	Villefranche XIII Aveyron	15 December, 18:00			Report
Villefranche XIII Aveyron (2nd)	8–34	Cahors Lot XIII	15 December, 20:30			Report
Villegailhenc-Aragon XIII (2nd)	4–34	Baroudeurs de Pia XIII	15 December, 15:00			
Paris Châtillon XIII	8–14	US Entraigues XIII	16 December, 15:00			
Montpellier Red Devils	0–68	Lyon Villeurbanne XIII	16 December, 15:00			Report
RC Caumont XIII	20–46	Toulon XIII Métropole	16 December, 15:00			Report
Saint-Martin XIII	44–8	Vendene XIII	16 December, 15:00			
Cheval Blanc XIII	18–30	RC Carpentras XIII	16 December, 15:00			
US Apt XIII	27–12	RC Salon XIII	16 December, 15:00			
École du XIII St Pierrais	4–38	RC Lescure-Arthes XIII	16 December, 15:00			
RC Aspet XIII	20–10	Gratentour XIII	16 December, 15:00			
AS Clairac XIII	16–48	US Pujols XIII	16 December, 15:00			
La Réole XIII	10–34	US Trentels XIII	16 December, 15:00			
Ramonville XIII	16–10	Realmont XIII	16 December, 15:00			
SC Saint-Laurent	6–42	Villeneuve Minervois XIII	16 December, 15:00		Christophe Grandjean	Report
Pamiers XIII	24–26	Barcarès	16 December, 15:00			Report
Ille-sur-Têt XIII	10–52	Villegailhenc-Aragon XIII	16 December, 15:00		M. Lannes	Report
Saint-Estève XIII Mavericks	0–32	Toulouges XIII Panthers	16 December, 15:00		Frédéric Cau	Report
Val de Dagne XIII	16–14	Salses XIII	16 December, 15:00		Kevin Delarose	Report

== Round 3 ==
The draw for Round 3 was made on 22 December. Ties were played over the weekend of 12–13 January.

Round 3 fixtures
Home	Score	Away	Match Information			
Home	Score	Away	Date and Time	Venue	Referee	Report
US Apt XIII	18–34	Lyon Villeurbanne XIII	12 January, 15:00		M. Matter	Report
US Ferrals XIII	12–54	Saint-Estève XIII Catalan	12 January, 15:00		Patrice Benausse	Report
Toulouges XIII Panthers	10–58	AS Carcassonne	12 January, 15:00			Report
Baroudeurs de Pia XIII	40–28	Villeneuve Minervois XIII	12 January, 17:00		Cyril Vergnes	Report
Tonneins XIII	0–58	Albi RL XIII	12 January, 17:30		Jérémy Vincent	Report
RC Aspet XIII	2–62	Toulouse Olympique Broncos	13 January, 15:00			
RC Baho XIII	14–36	XIII Limouxin	13 January, 15:00		Mohamed Drizza	Report
Barcarès	18–42	Palau XIII Broncos	13 January, 15:00		M. Bessières	Report
Cahors Lot XIII	2–64	Villefranche XIII Aveyron	13 January, 15:00			
FC Lézignan XIII	16–9	SO Avignon	13 January, 15:00		José Pereira	Report
Ramonville XIII	8–56	Saint-Gaudens Bears	13 January, 15:00			
Saint-Martin XIII	24–40	US Entraigues XIII	13 January, 15:00			
Toulon XIII Métropole	12–16 (Note: After extra time)	RC Carpentras XIII	13 January, 15:00			
US Trentels XIII	18–14	RC Lescure-Arthes XIII	13 January, 15:00			Report
Val de Dagne XIII	14–44	Villegailhenc-Aragon XIII	13 January, 15:00			Report
US Pujols XIII	12–56	Villeneuve XIII RLLG	13 January, 15:30		Fabien Nicaud	Report

== Round of 16 ==
The draw for Round of 16 was made on 19 January. Ties were played over the weekend of 9–10 March.

Round of 16 fixtures
Home	Score	Away	Match Information			
Home	Score	Away	Date and Time	Venue	Referee	Report
Lyon Villeurbanne XIII	12–24	RC Carpentras XIII	9 March, 16:00		M. Matter	Report
Baroudeurs de Pia XIII	14–44	Palau XIII Broncos	10 March, 15:00		José Pereira	Report
Saint-Gaudens Bears	30–46	Saint-Estève XIII Catalan	10 March, 15:00		Stéphane Vincent	Report
Toulouse Olympique Broncos	16–38	XIII Limouxin	10 March, 15:00		Cyril Vergnes	Report
US Trentels XIII	4–106	AS Carcassonne	10 March, 15:00			Report
Villefranche XIII Aveyron	0–58	FC Lézignan XIII	10 March, 15:00			Report
Villegailhenc-Aragon XIII	84–6	US Entraigues XIII	10 March, 15:00			Report
Albi RL XIII	14–12	Villeneuve XIII RLLG	10 March, 16:30		Mohamed Drizza	Report

== Quarter-finals ==
The draw for quarter-finals was made on 17 March. Ties were played over the weekend of 30–31 March.

Quarter-final fixtures
Home	Score	Away	Match Information			
Home	Score	Away	Date and Time	Venue	Referee	Report
Albi RL XIII	20–45	AS Carcassonne	30 March, 19:00	Stade Mazicou	Mohamed Drizza / Cyril Vergnes	Report
RC Carpentras XIII	14–50	Saint-Estève XIII Catalan	31 March, 15:30	Stade de la Roseraie	Benjamin Casty	Report
Palau XIII Broncos	14–40	XIII Limouxin	31 March, 16:00	Stade Georges-Vaills	Stéphane Vincent	Report
Villegailhenc-Aragon XIII	20–28	FC Lézignan XIII	31 March, 16:00	Stade Jérôme-Rieux	José Pereira	Report

== Semi-finals ==
The draw for semi-finals was made on 13 April. Ties were played on 4 May at the Stade Albert Domec, Carcassonne.

Semi-final fixtures
Home	Score	Away	Match Information			
Home	Score	Away	Date and Time	Venue	Referee	Report
XIII Limouxin	12–47	Saint-Estève XIII Catalan	4 May, 15:00	Stade Albert Domec	Mohamed Drizza / Benjamin Casty	Report
FC Lézignan XIII	18–30	AS Carcassonne	4 May, 17:30	Stade Albert Domec	Stéphane Vincent / Kevin Delarose	Report

== Final ==
The final of the 2018–19 Coupe de France Lord Derby took place on 9 June at the Stade Gilbert Brutus, Perpignan. The match, which was part of a triple header, was preceded by the finals of the Luc Nitard Cup (under 19s) and the Women's Elite 1 competition.

The final was between the two most recent winners of the competition, defending champions, Saint-Estève XIII Catalan, who had defeated XIII Limouxin 30–26 the previous season, and AS Carcassonne, who had won the cup 14 times, most recently in the 2016–17 season.

Final
Home	Score	Away	Match Information			
Home	Score	Away	Date and Time	Venue	Referee	Report
Saint-Estève XIII Catalan	6–22	AS Carcassonne	9 June, 18:30	Stade Gilbert Brutus, Perpignan	Mohamed Drizza / Benjamin Casty	Report

=== Teams ===
Saint-Estève XIII Catalan: Brochon, Martin, Pomeroy, Ambert, R. Franco, Mougues, J. Guasch, Bartès, Mresta-Doucet, Cozza, U. Perez, Séguier, Th. Margalet
Substitutes: Salabio, Le Cam, Bled, Zafra
Head coach: Benoit Albert

AS Carcassonne: Tumusa, Soubeyras, N. Djalout, V. Albert, Lo, L. Franco, Alberola, B. Escamilla, Khedimi, Rouanet, Canet, Baile, Sabri
Substitutes: J. Anderson, Soum, Zava
Head coach: Patrick Alberola

== Broadcast matches ==
Broadcast matches
Round	Match	Date	Broadcast method
Semi-finals	XIII Limouxin v Saint-Estève XIII Catalan	4 May 2019	Broadcast live on Radio Marseillette
Semi-finals	Lézignan vs Carcassonne	4 May 2019	Broadcast live on Radio Marseillette
Final	Saint-Estève XIII Catalan v Carcassonne	9 June 2019	Broadcast live on viàOccitanie and Radio Marseillette
