= Lord Derby Cup 2017–2018 =

French rugby league football competition

2017–18 Lord Derby French Cup
- Duration: 4 November 2017 – 10 June 2018
- Winners: Saint-Estève XIII Catalan
- Runners-up: XIII Limouxin

The 2017–18 Coupe de France Lord Derby was the 80th edition of the Coupe de France Lord Derby, the premier rugby league knockout competition in France. It began on 4 November 2017 and ended with the final at the Stade Gilbert Brutus on 10 June 2018.

The defending champions were AS Carcassonne who defeated FC Lézignan XIII in the 2016–17 final. In the 2017–18 competition, Carcassonne were knocked out in the quarter-finals by Lézignan who then lost in the semi-final to eventual champions Saint-Estève XIII Catalan who defeated XIII Limouxin 26–30 in the final.

== Background ==
The 80th edition of the Coupe de France Lord Derby, started on 4 November 2017 and concluded with the final on 10 June 2018.

The 60 teams taking part were from Elite 1 (10 teams), Elite 2 (10 teams), and the National and Federal divisions (40 teams). The majority of teams entered the competition in Round 2 and Elite 1 teams joined in Round 3. In matches between teams from different divisions, the venue was the stadium of the team from the lower division.

=== Format and dates ===
Lord Derby French Cup competition format
Round	Date	Clubs involved this round	Winners from previous round	New entries this round	Leagues entering at this round
Round 1	4–5 November	12	None	12	12 National/Federal Division teams
Round 2	16–17 December	44	6	38	All 10 teams from Elite 2 and 28 National/Federal Division teams
Round 3	13–14 January	32	22	10	All 10 teams from Elite 1
Round 4	17–18 February	16	16	None	
Quarter-finals	31 March – 2 April	8	8	None	
Semi-finals	5 May	4	4	None	
Final	10 June	2	2	None	

== Round 1 ==
The draw for the Round 1 took place in October 2017. Ties was played over the weekend of 4–5 November.

Round 1 fixtures
Home	Score	Away	Match Information			
Home	Score	Away	Date and Time	Venue	Referee	Report
Arles Moulès XIII	18–48	Montpellier Red Devils	5 November			
RC Caumont XIII	30–24	Saint-Martin XIII	5 November			
Plaisance du Touch XIII	12–10	RC Lescure-Arthes XIII (2nd)	5 November			
Villefranche XIII Aveyron (2nd)	18–14	Ramonville XIII	5 November			
Salses XIII	50–12	Realmont XIII	5 November			
St Laurent de la Cabrerisse	30–0	RC Salon XIII (2nd)	5 November			

== Round 2 ==
The draw for Round 2 was made in November. Ties were played over the weekend of 16–17 December. Because US Entraigues XIII (2nd) withdrew from competition, the last team in the draw, Tonneins XIII, were given a bye.

Round 2 fixtures
Home	Score	Away	Match Information			
Home	Score	Away	Date and Time	Venue	Referee	Report
Saluzzo	0–70	US Entraigues XIII (Note: Icons indicate clubs that competed in Elite 1 or Elite 2 this season)		Saluzzo		
RC Carpentras XIII (2nd)	10–28	Le Barcarès XIII Laurentin			M. Werel	
Cheval Blanc XIII	20–46	Sporting Treiziste Toulonnais				
Paris Châtillon XIII	20–36	Lyon Villeurbanne XIII		Paris		
Plaisance du Touch XIII	6–40	RC Lescure-Arthes XIII				
Ecole du XIII St Pierrais	12–42	US Ferrals XIII				
Ille-sur-Têt XIII	48–8	Val de Dagne XIII		Ille-sur-Têt	Frédéric Cau	
Marseille XIII	24–50	RC Carpentras XIII		Roger Couderc stadium, Marseille		
Cahors Lot XIII	6–52	US Pujols XIII				
Villegailhenc-Aragon XIII (2nd)	12–52	Baroudeurs de Pia XIII		Villegailhenc	Patrice Benausse	
Gratentour XIII	16–44	Villegailhenc-Aragon XIII				
St Laurent de la Cabrerisse	0–72	RC Baho XIII		St Laurent	M. Delarose	
Pomas XIII	50–14	Montpellier Red Devils			M. Granjean	
Salses XIII	31–18	Villeneuve Minervois XIII			Mickaël Lannes	Report
Villefranche XIII Aveyron (2nd)	46–6	Val d'Orbieu XIII				
RC Aspet XIII	10–38	US Trentels XIII		Aspet		
Toulouges XIII Panthers	10–54	Villefranche XIII Aveyron		Toulouges	Arnaud Capsié	Report
RC Caumont XIII	48–11	Aussillon XIII				
AS Clairac XIII	0–30	La Réole XIII	forfeited by AS Clairac			
Pamiers XIII	0–30	RC Salon XIII	forfeited by Pamiers			
Villefranche d'Albi XIII	30–0	Saint-Estève XIII (2nd)	forfeited by Saint-Estève			
Tonneins XIII	bye	—N/a				

== Round 3 ==
The draw for Round 3 was made on 20 December. Ties were played over the weekend of 13–14 January.

Round 3 fixtures
Home	Score	Away	Match Information			
Home	Score	Away	Date and Time	Venue	Referee	Report
AS Pomas XIII	19–33	US Ferrals XIII	13 January		M. Delarose	
Lyon Villeurbanne XIII	4–38	AS Carcassonne	13 January		M. Crespo	
RC Baho XIII	13–48	Saint-Estève XIII Catalan	13 January		M. Vincent	
Villefranche d'Albi XIII	14–26	US Trentels XIII	14 January			
Sporting Treiziste Toulonnais	10–44	Toulouse Olympique Broncos	14 January			
Villefranche XIII Aveyron	20–28	FC Lézignan XIII	14 January		M. Vergnes	
RC Caumont XIII	21–18	Le Barcarès XIII Laurentin	14 January			
US Entraigues XIII	14–46	XIII Limouxin	14 January		Christophe Grandjean	
US Pujols XIII	6–32	Palau XIII Broncos	14 January		Fabien Nicaud	
Ille-sur-Têt XIII	72–0	Villefranche XIII Aveyron (2nd)	14 January		David Albafouille	
La Réole XIII	12–58	Villegailhenc-Aragon XIII	14 January		M. Vincent	
Salses XIII	34–24	RC Lescure-Arthes XIII	14 January		Robert Gallego	
Tonneins XIII	18–34	RC Salon XIII	14 January			
Baroudeurs de Pia XIII	4–59	Saint-Gaudens Bears	14 January	Stade de la Basse	Frédéric Cau	
RC Carpentras XIII	10–66	SO Avignon	14 January	Stade de la Roseraie	Benjamin Casty	Report
Albi RL XIII	44–6	Villeneuve XIII RLLG	14 January		M. Drizza	Report

== Round 4 ==
The draw for Round 4 was made on 27 January. Ties were played over the weekend of 17–18 February.

Round of 16 fixtures
Home	Score	Away	Match Information			
Home	Score	Away	Date and Time	Venue	Referee	Report
Villegailhenc-Aragon XIII	16–12	Saint-Gaudens Bears	17 February, 15:00		M. Crespo	
RC Salon XIII	36–60	Palau XIII Broncos	17 February, 17:30		M. Drizza	
Ille-sur-Têt XIII	9–54	Saint-Estève XIII Catalan	18 February, 15:00		M. Pereira	
Salses XIII	8–54	FC Lézignan XIII	18 February, 15:00		M. Lannes	
US Trentels XIII	14–54	Albi RL XIII	18 February, 15:00		M. Nicaud	
US Ferrals XIII	10–68	SO Avignon	18 February, 15:00		M. Vergnes	
AS Carcassonne	26–17	Toulouse Olympique Broncos	18 February, 15:00		M. Poumès	
RC Caumont XIII	4–70	XIII Limouxin	18 February, 15:00		M. Gallego	

== Quarter-finals ==
The draw for quarter-finals was made on 26 February. Ties were played over the weekend of 30 March to 2 April.

Quarter-final fixtures
Home	Score	Away	Match Information			
Home	Score	Away	Date and Time	Venue	Referee	Report
Villegailhenc-Aragon XIII	20–28	Albi RL XIII	31 March		Geoffrey Poumès	Report
AS Carcassonne	8–10	FC Lézignan XIII	31 March		Cyril Vergnes	Report
XIII Limouxin	30–18	Palau XIII Broncos	1 April			
Saint-Estève XIII Catalan	50–12	SO Avignon	2 April		Benjamin Casty	Report

== Semi-finals ==
The draw for semi-finals was made on 11 April. Ties were played on 5 May at the Stade Albert Domec, Carcassonne.

Semi-final fixtures
Home	Score	Away	Match Information			
Home	Score	Away	Date and Time	Venue	Referee	Report
Albi RL XIII	16–28	XIII Limouxin	5 May, 15:30	Stade Albert Domec		Report
Saint-Estève XIII Catalan	38–26	FC Lézignan XIII	5 May, 18:00	Stade Albert Domec		Report

== Final ==
The final of the 2017–18 Coupe de France Lord Derby took place on 10 June at the Stade Gilbert Brutus, Perpignan. The match was preceded by the final of the (under 19s) Luc Nitard Cup.

XIII Limouxin had won the competition twice before, in the 1995–96 and 2007–08 seasons. Since their last win they had reached the final several times, most recently in the 2015–16 competition in which they lost to Saint-Estève XIII Catalan. The 2016 final was the team's first win as Saint-Estève XIII Catalan, though the cup had been won three times in the early 2000s as Union Treiziste Catalane.

The score was level at 26–26 after 80 minutes. Saint-Estève XIII Catalan won the match 30–26 with a golden point try in extra time.

Final
Home	Score	Away	Match Information			
Home	Score	Away	Date and Time	Venue	Referee	Report
XIII Limouxin	26–30	Saint-Estève XIII Catalan	10 June, 17:00	Stade Gilbert Brutus, Perpignan	M. Poumes / M. Casty	Report

=== Teams ===
XIII Limouxin: Th. Lasvenes, L. Franco, Mayans, Garrouste, R. Péault, Torreilles, Murcia, D. Pelo, S. Teixido, Herold, Puso, J. Edwards, Rouch
Substitutes: Fl. Bousquet, Yesa, Bartuziak, Gonzalez-Trique
Head coach:

Saint-Estève XIII Catalan: Jouffret, J. Nègre, Mat. Pala, Ambert, J. Flovie, Lu. Albert, Guasch, Th. Margalet, Meresta-Doucet, Belmas, B. Vergniol, Peez, Goudemand
Substitutes: A. Da Costa, Bartès, Saloty, Séguier
Head coach:

== Broadcast matches ==
Broadcast matches
Round	Match	Date	Broadcast method
Semi-finals	XIII Limouxin v Albi	5 May 2018	Broadcast live on Radio Marseillette
Semi-finals	Lézignan vs Saint-Estève XIII Catalan	5 May 2018	Broadcast live on Radio Marseillette
Final	XIII Limouxin v Saint-Estève XIII Catalan	10 June 2018	Broadcast live on FFRXIII TV
