= Lord Derby Cup 2022–2023 =

French rugby league football competition

2022–23 Lord Derby French Cup
- Duration: 6 November 2022 – 22 April 2023
- Number of teams: 30
- Winners: AS Carcassonne (16th title)
- Runners-up: Albi RL XIII

The 2022–23 Coupe de France Lord Derby was the 82nd edition of the Coupe de France Lord Derby, the premier rugby league knockout competition in France. It began on 6 November 2022 and ended with the final at the Stade Gilbert Brutus on 22 April 2023.

As no finals were played in the previous three seasons, the defending champions were AS Carcassonne who defeated Saint-Estève XIII Catalan in the 2018–19 final to win the cup for the 15th time. In the 2022–23 competition, they retained the title by winning 36–12 against Albi RL XIII in the final.

== Background ==
The 82nd edition of the Coupe de France Lord Derby, started on 6 November 2022 and concluded with the final on 22 April 2023. The 30 teams taking part were from Elite 1 (10 teams), Elite 2 (9 teams), the National Division (7 teams) and the Federal Division (4 teams). Teams entered at different stages the competition based on their division with Elite 2 teams joining in Round 4 and Elite 1 teams joining in the Round of 16. In matches between teams from different divisions, the venue was the stadium of the team from the lower division.

=== Format and dates ===
Lord Derby French Cup competition format
Round	Date	Clubs involved this round	Winners from previous round	New entries this round	Leagues entering at this round
Round 1	6 November	4	None	4	4 Federal Division teams
Round 2	20 November	6	2	4	4 National Division teams
Round 3	18 December	6	3	3	3 National Division teams
Round 4	22–23 January	12	3	9	All 9 teams from Elite 2
Round of 16	18–19 February	16	6	10	All 10 teams from Elite 1
Quarter-finals	4–5 March	8	8	None	
Semi-finals	9 April	4	4	None	
Final	22 April	2	2	None	

== Round 1 ==
The draw for the first three rounds was announced on 26 October 2022. Round 1 ties were played on 6 November.

Round 1 fixtures
Home	Score	Away	Match Information			
Home	Score	Away	Date and Time	Venue	Referee	Report
US Trentels XIII	37–22	AS Clairac XIII	6 November, 15:00			
Toulouges XIII Panthers	–	Val XIII	6 November, 15:00			

== Round 2 ==
Ties were played on 20 November.

Round 2 fixtures
Home	Score	Away	Match Information			
Home	Score	Away	Date and Time	Venue	Referee	Report
Pamiers XIII	48–0	Villefranche d'Albigeois	20 November, 15:00			
Salses XIII	14–22	US Ferrals XIII	20 November, 15:00		M. Sabri	
Val XIII	38–6	US Trentels XIII	20 November, 15:00	Stade Municipal, Serviès-en-Val	M. Grandjean	

== Round 3 ==
Ties were played on 18 December.

Round 3 fixtures
Home	Score	Away	Match Information			
Home	Score	Away	Date and Time	Venue	Referee	Report
Pamiers XIII	16–18	Palau XIII Broncos	18 December, 15:00			
US Ferrals XIII	38–30	Saint-Martin XIII	18 December, 15:00			
Val XIII	31–32	Baroudeur XIII Laurentin	18 December, 15:00			

== Round 4 ==
The draws for Round 4 and the Round of 16 were made on 10 December 2022. Round 4 ties were played on 22 January with one match postponed until 5 February.

Round 4 fixtures
Home	Score	Away	Match Information			
Home	Score	Away	Date and Time	Venue	Referee	Report
US Entraigues XIII (Note: Icons indicate clubs that competed in Elite 1 or Elite 2 this season)	44–22	Ille-sur-Têt XIII	22 January, 15:00	Stade Georges Mauro		Report
US Ferrals XIII	26–14	RC Salon XIII	22 January, 15:00	Stade de la Fontaine	M. De La Rose	Report
RC Baho XIII	18–26	RC Carpentras XIII	22 January, 15:00	Stade Michel Bardes		Report
Palau XIII Broncos	11–16	Villegailhenc-Aragon XIII	22 January, 15:00	Stade Georges-Vaills	Salim Sabri	Report
RC Lescure-Arthes XIII	34–22	Tonneins XIII	5 February (Note: Postponed from 22 January due to weather conditions)	Stade Jean Vidal		Report
Baroudeur XIII Laurentin	0–30	Villefranche XIII Aveyron	Match forfeited by Baroudeur XIII Laurentin			

== Round of 16 ==
Ties were played over the weekend of 18–19 February.

Round of 16 fixtures
Home	Score	Away	Match Information			
Home	Score	Away	Date and Time	Venue	Referee	Report
RC Carpentras XIII	6–88	AS Carcassonne	18 February	Stade de la Roseraie		Report
Saint-Estève XIII Catalan	16–29	SO Avignon	18 February	Stade Municipal		Report
Albi RL XIII	52–18	Villeneuve XIII RLLG	18 February	Stade Mazicou	M. Vincent	Report
US Entraigues XIII	12–68	FC Lézignan XIII	19 February	Stade Georges Mauro		Report
Villefranche XIII Aveyron	20–30	Saint-Gaudens Bears	19 February	Stade Henri Legarde		Report
US Ferrals XIII	22–78	Baroudeurs de Pia XIII	19 February	Stade de la Fontaine		Report
RC Lescure-Arthes XIII	0–88	XIII Limouxin	19 February	Stade Jean Vidal		Report
Villegailhenc-Aragon XIII	44–28	Toulouse Olympique Broncos	19 February	Stade Jérôme-Rieux	M. Grandjean	Report

== Quarter-finals ==
Ties were played over the weekend of 4–5 March.

Quarter-final fixtures
Home	Score	Away	Match Information			
Home	Score	Away	Date and Time	Venue	Referee	Report
XIII Limouxin	42–6	Saint-Gaudens Bears	4 March, 15:00	Stade Jérome-Rieux	M. Caffin	Report
SO Avignon	18–8	Baroudeurs de Pia XIII	4 March, 17:00	Parc des Sports		Report
AS Carcassonne	28–14	FC Lézignan XIII	4 March, 18:00	Stade Albert Domec	M. Crespo	Report
Villegailhenc-Aragon XIII	20–42	Albi RL XIII	5 March, 16:00	Stade Jérôme-Rieux		Report

== Semi-finals ==
The semi-finals took place on 9 April. They were played as part of a triple header with a Coupe de France Luc Nitard (under-19s) semi-final match.

Semi-final fixtures
Home	Score	Away	Match Information			
Home	Score	Away	Date and Time	Venue	Referee	Report
SO Avignon	14–46	AS Carcassonne	9 April, 17:00	Stadium d'Albi	M. Vincent	Report
XIII Limouxin	28–34	Albi RL XIII	9 April, 19:00	Stadium d'Albi	M. Delarose	Report

== Final ==
The final of the 2022–23 Coupe de France Lord Derby took place on 22 April at the Stade Gilbert Brutus, Perpignan. The match, which was part of a triple header, was preceded by the finals of the U15 and U17 competitions. AS Carcassonne, had won the cup 15 times and were defending champions having won the cup in 2018–19 (for three seasons no competition was held due to COVID). Their opponents, Albi, had previously won the cup once, in the 1973–74 season, and last reached the final in the 2007–08 season.

Final
Home	Score	Away	Match Information			
Home	Score	Away	Date and Time	Venue	Referee	Report
AS Carcassonne	36–12	Albi RL XIII	22 April, 17:15	Stade Gilbert Brutus, Perpignan	M. Delarose	Report

=== Teams ===
AS Carcassonne: Escaré, A. Escamilla, Bouregba, V. Albert, Gambaro, Herrero, O'Beirne, Boyer, Artiga, Canet, Surulevu, Mulhall, Khedimi
Interchanges: Drodrolagi, B. Escamilla, Dauliac, Alberola
Head coach: Frédéric Camel

Albi RL: Miloudi, Pedrero, Thilhades, Guiguet, Cancé, Wall, Gigot, Rodrigues, S. Cook, Diakhaté, Dupuy, Goffin, Bernard
Interchanges: J. Cook, Liauzun, Puech, Mazars
Head coach: Joris Canton

== Broadcast matches ==
Broadcast matches
Round	Match	Date	Broadcast method
Semi-finals	Avignon v Carcassonne	9 April 2023	Broadcast live on Albi TV
Semi-finals	Limouxin vs Albi	9 April 2023	Broadcast live on Albi TV
Final	Carcassonne vs Albi	22 April 2023	Broadcast live on Sport en France and viàOccitanie
