= Coupe de France Georges-Aillères =

French rugby league tournament

Challenge Georges Aillères
- Sport: Rugby league
- Formerly known as: Coupe de France Georges Aillères
- Instituted: 2012 (Invitational); 2016 (National)
- Country: France (FFR XIII)
- Holders: Villegailhenc-Aragon XIII (2025-26)
- Website: Georges Aillères Cup on FFR13.fr
- Related competition: Elite 2

The Challenge Georges Aillères, known in 2019 and 2020 as the Georges Aillères French Cup (French: Coupe de France Georges Aillères), is a French rugby league tournament. It was originally held as an invitational event, but then became a league cup competition for Elite 2 teams.

Poster for the 2012 edition, showing host team Toulouse Broncos in their original colors.

== History ==
=== Early years ===
The Challenge Georges Aillères started as an invitational preseason tournament hosted by Toulouse XIII Broncos at their home venue Stade Philippe-Struxiano. It was named after retired player Georges Aillères, who played most of his career for Toulouse area rugby league and rugby union clubs.

The original format was a single-day round-robin consisting of abridged 30-minute games. Toulouse's two main teams, the home side Broncos (Elite 2) and the Olympique (Elite 1), were mainstays while the two remaining spots were filled on a year-to-year basis. The Broncos won the 2012 edition, the earliest on record, losing to fellow Elite 2 members Lescure d'Albigeois, but beating both Elite 1 participants Toulouse Olympique and Limoux. The 2013 edition was won by Lézignan, with Limoux finishing second. In 2014, Toulouse Olympique won the tournament in which Lézignan and the Royal Artillery were invited to compete. In 2015, tournament hosts Toulouse Broncos were absorbed by the Toulouse Olympique organization and the event went dormant. Instead, the preseason featured a "Friendship Trophy" game between Toulouse's newly merged team and Albi, with the proceeds going to Albi product and Toulouse Olympique player Yoann Didone, who had recently suffered grave injuries in a road accident.

=== Relaunch ===
In 2016, the French Rugby League Federation took over the tournament's name and relaunched it under an entirely different format. This version served as a secondary cup competition open to all Elite 2 teams, using full-length games and a more spread-out schedule akin to other league cups. In 2019, the tournament was renamed Coupe de France Georges-Aillères, as part of a general strategy by the federation to brand its various cup competitions "Coupe de France", regardless of their level. In the 2019–20 competition Villefranche XIII Aveyron and Villegailhenc-Aragon XIII had qualified for the final at the time the competition was suspended due to the COVID-19 pandemic in France No competition was held in the following seasons, but the French Rugby League Federation announced that it would return in the 2025–26 season under its original name of the Challenge Georges Aillères.

== In the French rugby league pyramid ==
The country's major cup tournament, the Lord Derby Cup (French: Coupe Lord Derby), was open to clubs from all divisions until the 2023–24 season when it was restricted to teams from the top two leagues. The Challenge Georges Aillères is one of the minor French Cups offered for competition by the national federation, together with the National Division Cup. (Note: Before the merger of the National and Federal Divisions at the start of the 2023–24 season the teams competed in separate cup competitions: the Paul Dejean Cup (French: Coupe Paul-Dejean) for National Division clubs, and the Albert Falcou Cup (French: Coupe Albert-Falcou) for Federal Division clubs.)

== Results ==
List of winners and finals
Season	Champions	Score	Runners-up	Ref.
2012–13	Toulouse XIII Broncos	No final played (round-robin tournament)		
2013–14	FC Lézignan XIII	No final played (round-robin tournament)		
2014–15	Toulouse Olympique	No final played (round-robin tournament)		
2015–16	No competition			
2016–17	RC Baho XIII	33–29	Villefranche XIII Aveyron	
2017–18	Villegailhenc-Aragon XIII	20–17	Villefranche XIII Aveyron	
2018–19	RC Baho XIII	40–12	Baroudeurs de Pia XIII	
2019–20	Cancelled due to COVID-19			
2020–21 to 2024–25	No competition			
2025–26	Villegailhenc-Aragon XIII	50–16	RC Lescure-Arthes XIII	

== See also ==
- Rugby league in France
- French rugby league system
