= Opoul XIII =

Defunct French rugby league club

Club information
- Full name: Opoul XIII
- Exited: 2011; 14 years ago

Former details
- Ground(s): Stade de la Lime

Uniforms
Home colours

Opoul XIII were a French Rugby league club based in Opoul-Périllos, Pyrénées Orientales in the Languedoc-Roussillon region. The club played in the Languedoc-Rousillon League in the French National Division 2. Home games were played at the Stade de la Lime.

== History ==
Opoul XIII had a rather undistinguished and uneventful early years until the 1984–85 season while they were in the bottom league Federal Division now called the National Division 2 when they surprisingly reached the league final, but were beaten 19–8 by Mazan XIII. In the 1988–89 season, they went one better and won the competition after victory over Saint-Hyppolite XIII 27–12. After another decade of no trophies, it was announced in 2000 that they were going to merge with close neighbours Salses XIII and become Salses Opoul XIII. Under the new banner, the club enjoyed their most successful period. Over the next seven years, they reached and won 5 finals, starting with the Federal Division following victory over Le Mas Agenais XIII 36–22. The next two seasons brought consecutive Coupe Falcou victories. The 2005 victory was the first stage of a league and cup double completed when they beat Baroudeurs de Pia XIII 36–20. The final trophy was picked up with a win over Montpellier Red Devils in the Paul Dejean Cup. Following this cup winning season, the two clubs went their separate ways again. By 2011, Opoul XIII decided to call it a day and closed.

== Club honours ==
- National Division 1 (National 2) (1): 2004-05
- National Division 2 (Fédéral Division) (2): 1988–89, 2002–03
- Coupe Falcou (2): 2004, 2005
- Paul Dejean Cup (1): 2007
