= Le Soler XIII =

French rugby league club

Club information
- Full name: Le Soler XIII
- Nickname(s): Los Diablos
- Founded: 1955 (Refounded 2008; 17 years ago)
- Website: Website

Current details
- Ground(s): Stade Municipal Le Soler
- Chairman: Georges Llado, Eric Navarro, Vincent Guittard
- Coach: Damien Charles
- Manager: Jean-Baptiste Llado
- Competition: National Division 2 (Languedoc-Rousillon Region)
- 2018/19: 3rd

Uniforms
Home colours

Le Soler XIII are a French Rugby league club based in Le Soler, Pyrénées Orientales in the Languedoc-Roussillon region. Founded in 1955 and refounded in 2008 the club plays in the Languedoc-Roussillon League in the French National Division 2. Home matches are played at the Stade Municipal Le Soler

== History ==
Founded in 1955 as RC Le Soler XIII by Noel Amoros and Pierre Aspaillange the new club reached their first league title final in 1959 when they finished runner-up to RC Salon XIII in the 2nd Division now called the National Division 1 league, losing by 10-21. The following season they finished runner-up again this time in the regional Rousillon League. It was during the early 1980s that the club enjoyed their best spell. Under player-coach Cesar Rodriguez the club not only produced future top flight players like Jacques Jorda, Michel Charcos, Antoine Gonzalez and their own captain at the time Jo Bruzy they also enjoyed on the field success with these players. In season 82/83 they convincingly won the Federal Division nowadays called the National Division 2 thrashing RC Lescure-Arthes XIII in the final 47-0. Season 83/84 brought continued success as they went on to lift the National 2 title after beating Saint-Paul Fenouilledes XIII in the final 16-10 and winning promotion to the 2nd tier. During this season they also embarked on their best Lord Derby cup run. After despatching Palau XIII Broncos, top tier club Limoux Grizzlies and Pennautier XIII in the group stages they went and beat top flight club SM Pia XIII in the Quarter-Finals. At the Semi-Final Stage they were drawn against the current champions and powerhouses XIII Catalan. The game was played at the Stade Aime-Giral in Perpignan in front of a crowd of 5,000 and the minnows from the 3rd tier Le Soler did themselves proud in only going down 5-15. There then followed some fallow times including a couple of relegations and by the new millennium the club was struggling both on and off the field. In 2008 the club closed down but was quickly reformed under a new name Le Soler XIII. a new board was announced and the club colours were changed from the original red shirts and yellow shorts and socks (Catalan colours) to black and white hoops. The old colours remain on the club logo. In 2010 the newly reformed club won the National Division 2 Languedoc-Rousillon League and in 2011/12 they went one better and won the overall National Division 2 title beating US Trentels XIII 23-12 earning promotion in the process. After a couple of struggling seasons in the National Division 1 they were relegated back to the 4th tier.

== Club honours ==
- National Division 1 (National 2) (1): 1983-84
- National Division 2 (Fédéral Championship) (2): 1982-83, 2011–12
