= US Plaisance XIII =

French rugby league club

Club information
- Full name: Union Sportive Plaisance XIII
- Founded: 2015; 11 years ago
- Website: Official site

Current details
- Ground: Stade de Plaisance
- Coach: Patrice Henrat
- Competition: National Division 2 (Aquitaine Region)
- 2018/19: 3rd

Uniforms
Home colours

US Plaisance XIII are a French rugby league club based in Plaisance-du-Touch in the region of Haute-Garonne. Founded in 2015, they competed in the National Division 2 Aquitaine region. Home matches are played at the Stade de Plaisance.

== History ==
Union Sportive Plaisance XIII were formed in 2015 on the back of successful youth and ladies teams. In season 2015/16, their debut season, they finished a respectful 3rd in the regional Midi-Pyrenees league.

In 2017, the club reached in the second round of the Lord Derby Cup.
