= Léo Laurent =

French professional rugby league footballer

Leo Laurent
Personal information
- Full name: Léo Laurent
- Born: 8 May 2001 (age 25) Pyrénées-Orientales, Occitania, France
- Height: 6 ft 0 in (1.83 m)
- Weight: 13 st 12 lb (88 kg)

Playing information
- Position: Second-row, Loose forward
Club
Years	Team	Pld	T	G	FG	P
2020–	Saint-Estève XIII Catalan	30	4	0	0	16
2022–	Catalans Dragons	1	0	0	0	0
	Total	31	4	0	0	16
- Source: As of 2 April 2023

Léo Laurent (born 8 May 2001) is a French professional rugby league footballer who plays as a second-row or loose forward for the Catalans Dragons in the Super League.

In 2022, he made his Catalans debut in the Super League against the Wigan Warriors.
