= ES Montgeron XIII =

French rugby league club

Club information
- Full name: Entente Sportive Montgeron XIII
- Nickname: Les Rams
- Founded: 1972; 54 years ago

Current details
- Ground: Stade Georges Pompidou (COSEC)
- Chairman: Daniel Urbino
- Competition: National Division 2 (Ile de France Region)
- 2018/19: 5th

Uniforms
Home colours

Entente Sportive Montgeron XIII are a French Rugby league club based in Montgeron, Essonne in the Île-de-France region. Founded in 1972. The club plays in the Île-de-France regional league of the French National Division 2.

== History ==
In 1945 Entente Sportive Montgeronnaise were formed as a multi sports club incorporating football, athletics and basketball at the local college. A rugby league club Entente Sportive Montgeron XIII were formed in 1972 and currently runs senior, ladies and junior clubs.
