= Ille-sur-Têt XIII =

French semi-professional rugby league club

Club information
- Full name: Ille-sur-Têt XIII
- Nickname: Devils
- Founded: 1945; 81 years ago
- Website: ille13.com

Current details
- Ground: Stade Jean Galia
- Chairman: Eric Sibieude
- Competition: Elite Two Championship

Uniforms
Home colours

Ille-sur-Têt XIII are a French Rugby league club based in Ille-sur-Têt, Pyrénées Orientales in the Languedoc-Roussillon region. The club plays in the French Elite Two Championship. Founded in 1945 they play their home games at the Stade Jean Galia.

== History ==
Ille-sur-Tet was the birthplace of legendary French Rugby league pioneer Jean Galia, and in 1945 local businessman Henri Rous founded Ille-sur-Tet XIII. During the club's early years the local Rugby union club, U.S. Illois, did try on a number of occasions to stop the rugby league club from starting up and deny them access to the towns venues, but they failed.

In 1955, the club won the regional Rousillon League beating Caramany XIII. They once again won the Rousillon League in 59/60 beating Le Soler XIII in the final, played in Elne, by a score of 10-8. The following season brought yet more success as they reached the 2nd Division title final (later renamed the National Division 1) and were victorious over ASPTT Marseille 10-8 in Nimes. The Rousillon League was won again in 61/62, after beating new club SM Pia XIII 11-7.

It would be another three decades before the Ille-sur-Tet XIII had a strong season, reaching the 2nd Division final in 91/92, but lost 5-10 against Le Pontet XIII in a game played at the Stade Albert Domec in Carcassonne. They reached the final again in 94/95.

The Ille-sur-Tet XIII juniors were crowned champions in 1967 and 1992 and lifted the cup in 1994. A number of the successful 1994 juniors joined the main team at the end of that season, as it reached the Federal Division (4th tier of National Division 2) final, but lost to AS Clairac XIII 12-20.

In 1995, Australian Klaus Perksvic became the club's first overseas player.

In 1999, Ille-sur-Tet XIII reached the Federal Division Final, losing 15-30 to the Montpellier Red Devils in front of a crowd of 1,500. Still in the 4th tier Federal Division in the 1999/2000 season, Ille-sur-Tet XIII were drawn at home against tier-1 club Lézignan Sangliers in the Lord Derby Cup, losing 14-34 in front of a record home crowd of 2,500. That season they also reached the Federal Division Final, losing the Coupe Falcou 4-8 against Sainte-Livrade XIII. The team was promoted to tier 3 for the 2000/01 season, losing the 2001 final against Homps Minervois XIII 5-12 at the Stade Jean-Laffon in Perpignan in the National 2 (today's National Division 1, 3rd tier).

A strong 2001/02 took the team to the National Division 1 final, where they defeated Le Barcares XIII 20-6, winning their second ever trophy after a 41 year delay.

After a league re-structure in 2008 the club opted to drop down to the 4th tier regional National Division 2 competition. In season 2009/10 they reached the Languedoc-Rousillon regional National Division 2 league final but were beaten by Le Soler XIII 7-38

== Notable players ==
- Thibaud Margalet

== Club honours ==
- National Division 1 (National 2) (2): 1960-61, 2001–02
- Elite 2 (1): 2022–23
- Coupe de France fédérale (Coupe Falcou): 2018
