= Stade Georges Vaills =

Rugby stadium in Palau-del-Vidre, France

- Interactive map of Stade Georges Vaills
- Full name: Stade Georges Vialls
- Coordinates: 42.5758°N 2.9676°E
- Surface: Grass

Tenant
- Palau XIII Broncos (1920-)

The Stade Georges Vialls is a rugby stadium in Palau-del-Vidre in France. Palau XIII Broncos the local rugby league team who play in the Elite 2 have, since their founding in 1920 always used the ground. The ground is named after a former player who was born in the area and played for the first team. The ground is situated next to the Tech river and has one main stand. Some British clubs when they are in France to play Catalans Dragons they use the ground prior to the match to train on. The ground hosted two youth internationals in 2009 and in 2011.

== International rugby League Games ==
Date	Teams	Score	Attendance	Match
11 November 2009	France u19 v England u19	22-14		Youth International
3 June 2011	France u19 v England u19	19-28		Youth International
