= Nanterre Rugby League =

French rugby league club

Club information
- Full name: Nanterre Rugby League
- Nickname: Les Hussards
- Founded: 2013; 13 years ago

Current details
- Ground: Stade Jean Guimier
- Chairman: Vince Marin
- Competition: National Division 2 (Ile de France regional league)
- 2017/18: 1st

Uniforms
Home colours

Nanterre Rugby League are a French Rugby league club based in Nanterre, Hauts-de-Seine in the western suburbs of Paris. Founded in 2013 the club plays in the Ile de France regional National Division 2 league. Home games are played at the Stade Jean Guimier.

== History ==
Founded in 2013 rugby league joins a list of prominent sports and teams played in the region including basketball (Nanterre 92), football (Racing club de France Colombes 92) and (ES Nanterre) and rugby union (Racing 92). International rugby league has been played in Nanterre at both the Stade Jean Guimier and the Stade Gabriel Peri when they hosted a student tournament involving Paris XIII, Italy and Hungary as well as a one off international between Australia students and their French counterparts in June 2013 at both men's and women's levels. The club itself has enjoyed some success in finishing top in the Ile de France region in 2015.
