= Nantes Rugby XIII =

French rugby league club

Club information
- Full name: Bretagne Nantes Rugby XIII
- Nickname: Vikings
- Founded: 1936; 90 years ago
- Website: Official site

Current details
- Ground: Stade Michel Lecointre
- Chairman: Guillaume Renvez
- Coach: Sylvain Vidaillac
- Competition: National Division 4 (Pool 1)
- 2023–24: 3rd

Uniforms
Home colours

Nantes Rugby XIII are a French rugby league club based in Nantes, Loire-Atlantique in the Pays de la Loire region. In the 2023–24 season, the club played in the North Pool of the French National Division 3 & 4 and then Pool 1 of National Division 4.

== History ==
Founded in 1936 as Bretagne Nantes XIII they were one of the earliest rugby league clubs in France. In the 1963–64 season, the club played in the final of the old 2nd Division, now called National Division 1, where they lost to SM Pia XIII.
