= Toulon XIII Métropole =

French semi-professional rugby league club

Club information
- Full name: Toulon XIII Metropole Marlins
- Founded: 2011; 15 years ago
- Website: website

Current details
- Ground: Stade Delaune
- Chairman: Chantal Ruidavets
- Coach: Chahery Mouridi
- Manager: Bernard Capitani
- Competition: National Division 2

Uniforms
Home colours	Away colours

Toulon XIII Metropole Marlins are French rugby league side based in Toulon, in the region of Provence-Alpes-Cote-d'Azur. Founded in 2011, their home matches are currently played at the Stade Delaune.

== History ==
Founded on 16 July 2011 by Walid Kadir, Sporting Treiziste Toulonnais played their first match on 18 September 2011 against Marseille XIII Avenir at the Stade Jean Alex-Fernandez in Toulon winning 40-24. That first season in National Division 2 saw the club finish a respectful 5th. The following season 2012/13 they finished second behind Saint-Martin XIII and were promoted. They lasted just one season in National Division 1, losing their only to that date coach, former French international player Gael Tallec, who resigned. 2014/15 they bounced back immediately and were promoted back to National Division 1 as champions. This time they stayed up finishing 6th. In 2017 they beat US Trentels XIII 28-24 to lift the Paul Dejean Cup. They were promoted to the Elite Two Championship for the 2018-19 season. For the 2019-20 season, the club launched a reserve team competing in the Federal championship. The club withdrew its team from the Elite 2 at the start of the 2021-22 season and forfeited a place in the National Division the following season.

== Stadium ==
Despite their short history Toulonnais have already used three stadiums. From 2011-2013 they played at Stade Jean Alex-Fernandez. They are based at Stade Leo-Lagrange and Stade Delaune.

== Honours ==
- National Division 2 (1): 2014-15
- Paul Dejean Cup (1): 2017
