= AS Corbeil-Essonnes XIII Spartans =

French semi-professional rugby league club

AS Corbeil Essonnes (Spartiates XIII)

Club information
- Full name: Association Sportive Corbeil Essonnes XIII Spartiates
- Nickname(s): Les Spartiates
- Founded: 1945; 80 years ago

Current details
- Ground(s): Stade Robinson
- Chairman: Khaled Maïza
- Competition: National Division 2 (Ile de France Region)
- 2018/19: 4th

Uniforms
Home colours

AS Corbeil Essonne XIII Spartiates are a French Rugby league club based in Essonnes, Paris in the Île-de-France region. The club plays in the Île-de-France regional league of the French National Division 2.

== History ==
- It wasn't until 2009 that AS Corbeil XIII, as they were originally called, made an impact in French rugby league. It was that season that the club recorded their highest ever league position, winning the second tier Elite Two Championship by beating RC Baho XIII in the final 30-14 under Australian coach Jamie Papa.
- Unable to earn promotion to the top flight, the club went into administration after overstretching themselves and were forced to drop down to the bottom tier.
- The new owners renamed the club The Spartiates XIII after the club relocated to Essonnes and were brought under the same banner as the football club of the same name.
- The club also left their home ground Stade de Robinson and moved to the Stade Albert Mercier.
- In the 2010–2011 season they won the National Division 2 title.
- In 2015 the name Spartans was added to the club name.

== Honours ==
- Elite Two Championship (1): 2008-09
- National Division 2 (1): 2010-11
