= Gratentour XIII =

French semi-professional rugby league club

Club information
- Full name: Gratentour Rugby XIII
- Nickname(s): Les Mustangs
- Founded: 1982; 43 years ago
- Website: Website

Current details
- Ground(s): Stade de Gratentour
- Chairman: Christophe Garcia

Uniforms
Home colours

Gratentour XIII are a French Rugby league club based in Gratentour, Haute-Garonne in the Occitania region. In the 2024–25 season, the club plays in the French National Division 2/3.

== History ==
Gratentour Rugby XIII have won two Coupe Falcou in 2010 and 2019. They had lost out to AS Clairac XIII in the National 2, now called the National Division 1, league final 4-34 one year before. In 2012–13 season, they reached the regional Midi-Pyrenees National Division 2 league final against Cahors Lot XIII and the final of French National Division 2 league final in the 2018–19 season against Saint-Estève XIII catalan reserve grade.

In the 2021–22 season, Gratentour were promoted to the Elite 2 championship. They also formed partnership agreements to become the reserve side for Toulouse Olympique and for Ramonville XIII to become the reserve side of Gratentour. In the 2022–23 season, Gratentour dropped back down to the National Division. In the 2024–25 season, Grantentour defeated US Trentels XIII 42–30 to win the National Division 2 (DN2) final.

== Club honours ==
- Coupe Falcou (2): 2010, 2019
- National Division 2 (DN2) (1): 2024–25
