= Homps Minervois XIII =

French rugby league club

Club information
- Full name: Homps Minervois XIII
- Colours: White, Red and Black
- Founded: 2008; 18 years ago
- Website: Website

Current details
- Ground: Stade de l'Enclos Bourdier
- Competition: National Division 2

Homps Minervois XIII are a French Rugby league club based in Homps, Aude in the Languedoc-Roussillon region. The club plays in Pool A of the Languedoc-Roussillon League in the French National Division 2.

== History ==
The current Homps open age team was reformed in the summer of 2008 after an absence of seven years. The previous incarnation won the French National 2 title in 2001.

== Club honours ==
- French National 2
  - Winners - 2001
