= Ecole du XIII St Pierrais =

French rugby league club

Club information
- Full name: Ecole du XIII St Pierrais
- Founded: 1981; 44 years ago

Current details
- Competition: National Division 2 (Midi-Pyrenees Region)
- 2016/17: 7th

Uniforms
Home colours

Ecole du XIII St Pierrais are a French Rugby league club based in Saint-Pierre-de-Trivisy, Tarn in the Occitania region. Founded in 1981. The club played in the Midi-Pyrénées League in the French National Division 2. The club runs both senior and ladies teams. In the 2018–19 season, the club reached the quarter-finals of the Coupe de France Albert-Falcou but due to lack of players the senior team withdrew from the Federal Division before the start of the 2019–20 season.
