= Gifi Bias XIII =

Defunct French rugby league club

Club information
- Full name: Gifi Bias XIII
- Nickname: The Lions
- Colours: Plum and White
- Founded: 1961; 64 years ago
- Exited: 2014; 11 years ago

Uniforms
Home colours

Gifi Bias XIII were a French Rugby league club based in Bias, Lot-et-Garonne, in the Aquitaine region. The club played in the French National Division 1 and National Division 2 leagues during its time. Founded in 1961, the club moved to Pujols, Lot-et-Garonne in 2014 and changed names to US Pujols XIII

== History ==
Gifi Bias XIII were founded in 1961 but the club would have to wait for over 30 years before their first final appearance. That came in 1995 when they won the Coupe Falcou and by the end of the season they had completed a league and cup double after defeating RC Lescure-Arthes XIII in the National 2 nowadays the National Division 1 league final 34-12. By the time of the new millennium though the club found itself back in the bottom tier. In season 2001/02 they won promotion back to the National 2 after winning against Aspet XIII 18-10. Back in the National 2 the club enjoyed a successful season winning the Coupe Falcou for a second time and reaching the league final against Aspet XIII in a repeat of the previous Federal Division final, this time though they lost out 9-16 but were promoted to the 2nd tier for the first time. After a couple of seasons in the Elite Two Championship Gifi Bias reached the league final in 2007 and against all odds won 16-14 against Racing Club Albi XIII. The club decided not to take up the offer if promotion to the top flight and this led to the team slowly breaking up. In the 2009–10 season, the club were competing in the National Division 1 and reached the final of the Coupe de France Paul-Dejean, which they lost 22–16 to Tonneins XIII. By 2012 the club were back in the 4th tier after suffering successive relegations. The club were dormant during the 2012–13 season and when they announced their return to the National Division 2 the following season their home ground was unavailable so their matches were to be played in Pujols. In 2014 the club also decided to change the name of the club to reflect their change of location, thus becoming US Pujols XIII. The 'Lion' was maintained in the new club's logo.

== Honours ==
- Elite Two Championship (1): 2006–07
- National Division 1 (National 2) (1): 1994–95
- National Division 2 (Federal Division) (1): 2001–02
- Coupe Falcou (2): 1995, 2003
