= National Division 1 =

French third tier rugby league championship

- Founded: 1949
- Country: France
- Number of clubs: 8
- Level on pyramid: 3
- Promotion to: Elite 2
- Relegation to: National Division 2
- Domestic cup: Lord Derby Cup
- League cup: Paul Dejean Cup

The National Division 1 is the third tier of rugby league in France, below the Elite 2 Championship and above the National Division 2. The season runs from September to April.

The winner can be promoted to Elite Two subject to having adequate finances and facilities. Occasionally if the winners are not able to be promoted, or opt out, then the team finishing second could be promoted.

== History ==
The league was first played for in 1949-50 under the title 2nd Division. The 2nd Division was played for until 1966 when the competition, after a league restructure, was ended. Brought back in 1976 under the title National 2 representing clubs at the 3rd tier. In 2008 the competition was rebranded and called National Division 1. For the start of season 2012–13 the league was split into East and West regional divisions where each team plays each other in their regional league home and away with the top sides then meeting in a series of play-off matches resulting in a Grand Final.

In 2023, the Federal and National Division merged in a restructuring of the French rugby league system. For the 2023–24 season there were four national divisions grouped in pairs: National Division 1 & 2 and National Division 3 & 4. In the first part of the season teams were divided into regional pools from which they qualified for the finals stage. In the 2024–25 season, the league was altered again to have a single National Division 1 and, following the withdrawal of several clubs, a National Division 2/3.

== Teams ==
Teams for the 2024–25 season:

- Cahors Lot XIII
- US Entraigues XIII
- US Ferrals XIII
- A.S. Pomas XIII
- Saint-Martin XIII
- Salses XIII
- Toulouges-Baho Falcons
- Villefranche D'Albi XIII

== Past winners ==
Year	Champions	Score	Runner up
1949-50	RC Carpentras XIII	Won on points	
1950-51			
1951-52			
1952-53			
1953-54	Lavardac XIII	2-0	AS Carcassonne XIII 'A'
1954-55			
1955-56	Lavardac XIII	10-5	Bordeaux Facture XIII
1956-57	Libourne XIII	8-5	Palau XIII Broncos
1957-58	US Apt XIII	18-8	AS Clairac XIII
1958-59	RC Salon XIII	21-10	RC Le Soler XIII
1959-60	Armée II XIII	51-10	Castelnaudary XIII
1960-61	Ille-sur-Tet XIII	10-8	ASPTT Marseille
1961-62			
1962-63	Le Pontet XIII	10-5	Ille-sur-Tet XIII
1963-64	SM Pia XIII		Nantes Rugby XIII
1964-65	Vedene XIII		Paris XIII
1965-66	US Entraigues XIII		SO Avignon
1975-76	RC Salon XIII	13-2	US Entraigues XIII
1976-77	Saint-Cyprien	16-15	US Ferrals XIII
1977-78	Realmont XIII	14-13	Sainte-Livrade XIII
1978-79	Aspet XIII	11-5	Lestelle XIII
1979-80	Aspet XIII	18-9	La Redorte XIII
1980-81	La Redorte XIII	17-9	Le Barcarès XIII
1981-82	Auterive XIII	20-9	Pennautier XIII
1982-83	Pennautier XIII	25-17	Narbonne XIII
1983-84	RC Le Soler XIII	16-10	Saint-Paul Fenouilledes XIII
1984-85	Palau XIII Broncos	24-15	RC Baho XIII
1985-86	RC Baho XIII	34-20	Palau XIII Broncos
1986-87	US Trentels XIII	7-6	RC Baho XIII
1987-88	AS Cadurcienne	17-6	RC Lescure-Arthes XIII
1988-89	Le Pontet XIII	15-9	US Entraigues XIII
1989-90	La Réole XIII	8-6	Saint-Hyppolite XIII
1990-91	Saint-Hyppolite XIII	17-9	US Entraigues XIII
1991-92	Saint-Hyppolite XIII	20-12	Tonneins XIII
1992-93	Cabestany XIII	16-14	Palau XIII Broncos
1993-94	Toulouse Jules-Julien	12-8	RC Lescure-Arthes XIII
1994-95	Gifi Bias XIII	34-12	RC Lescure-Arthes XIII
1995-96	Le Barcarès XIII	20-15	RC Lescure-Arthes XIII
1996-97	Morières XIII	12-8	SU Cavaillon XIII
1997-98	Puygouzon XIII	17-15	Realmont XIII
1998-99	AS Clairac XIII	34- 4	Gratentour XIII
1999-2000	Palau XIII Broncos	28-12	Realmont XIII
2000-01	Homps Minervois XIII	12-5	Ille-sur-Tet XIII
2001-02	Ille-sur-Tet XIII	20-6	Le Barcarès XIII
2002-03	Aspet XIII	16-9	Gifi Bias XIII
2003-04	Vedene XIII	42-6	Baroudeurs de Pia XIII
2004-05	Salses XIII	36-20	Baroudeurs de Pia XIII
2005-06	Villeneuve Tolosane	30-14	Baroudeurs de Pia XIII
2006-07	Ornaisons XIII	26-14	Pieusse Blanquette XIII
2007-08	Palau XIII Broncos	34-26	Ornaisons XIII
2008-09	Villefranche XIII-Aveyron	24-20	Realmont XIII
2009-10	Le Barcares XIII	33-16	Tonneins XIII
2010-11	Tonneins XIII	20-16	Sauveterre de Comminges XIII
2011-12	Sauveterre de Comminges XIII	28-4	Ornaisons XIII
2012-13	Realmont XIII	23-4	La Reole XIII
2013-14	La Reole XIII	30-26	US Entraigues XIII
2014-15	US Ferrals XIII	24-22	Villegailhenc-Aragon XIII
2015-16	US Ferrals XIII	34-20	US Entraigues XIII
2016-17	US Pujols XIII	26-23	Realmont XIII
2017-18	Baroudeurs de Pia XIII	34-21	Toulon XIII Métropole
2018-19	Ille-sur-Têt XIII	22-18	Realmont XIII
2021-22	Tonneins XIII	24-14	Realmont XIII
2022-23	Palau XIII Broncos	23-20	US Ferrals XIII
2023-24	Realmont XIII	29-26	Pamiers XIII

== See also ==
- French rugby league system
- Rugby league in France
- Lord Derby Cup
- Coupe Falcou
- Paul Dejean Cup
