= US Villeneuvoise XIII =

French rugby league club

Club information
- Full name: Union Sportive Villeneuvoise XIII
- Nickname: Les Viperes
- Founded: 1965; 61 years ago
- Website: site

Current details
- Ground: Stade Municipal Villeneuve-de-Riviere
- Chairman: Gilbert Martin
- Competition: National Division 2 (Midi-Pyrennes Region)
- 2018/19: 8th

Uniforms
Home colours

Union Sportive Villeneuvoise XIII are a French Rugby league club based in Villeneuve-de-Riviere in the region of Haute-Garonne in the south of France. The club was founded in 1965 and currently plays in the Midi-Pyrenees regional National Division 2 league which is the 4th tier of rugby league in France. Home games are played at the Stade Municipal.

== History ==
Leon Gauthier formed the first club on the 22 July 1965 and became their first president. The original club was called Association Sportive Jeu XIII this remained the club's name until 1972 when the team's current title was first introduced. In 2003 the club became a feeder club to Saint-Gaudens Bears and in 2007 the club's first youth teams were set up.
