= Salses XIII =

French rugby league club

Club information
- Full name: Salses XIII
- Founded: 1955; 71 years ago

Current details
- Ground: Stade Fontvielle (3,000)
- Chairman: Jean-Baptiste Lautrey and Medhi Fraihat
- Coach: Marcello Moreno
- Competition: National Division 1 (Languedoc-Rousillon Region)

Uniforms
Home colours

Salses XIII are a French Rugby league club based in Salses-le-Château, Pyrénées-Orientales in the Languedoc-Roussillon region. They play in the French National Division 2 Languedoc-Rousillon League. Home games are played at the Stade Fontvielle

== History ==
The club was founded in 1955 at a time when new clubs were starting up in rugby league, as the French national team were enjoying what would be their best period at international level. It would take Salses until 1986 to appear in their first final, defeated by Ornaisons XIII 10-16 in the Federal Division', now known as the National Division 2 league. In 2000 they merged with local side Opoul XIII to become Salses Opoul XIII this partnership would last for seven years, when both clubs reverted to their original names. During this joint partnership the newly named club reached five finals and won them all. In 2002/03 they lifted the Federal Division and earned promotion after defeating Le Mas Agenais XIII 36-22 in the final. Two Coupe Falcou wins arrived in 2004 and 2005 the latter was the start of a league and cup double as they went on and won the National 2 now called National Division 1 league final against Baroudeurs de Pia XIII 36-20. In 2007 the Paul Dejean Cup was won for the first time after victory over Montpellier Red Devils 38-20. After the two clubs went their separate ways Salses continued to be the more prominent of the two, despite a double relegation back to the bottom tier, the fortunes of their former partners Opoul XIII were worse as they called it a day. In 2013 Salses reached their second Paul Dejean Cup final but this time went down 10-37 against Villegailhenc-Aragon XIII. Season 2015/16 brought both joy and pain, joy when they won a third Coupe Falcou with victory over US Pujols XIII 30-11 and pain when they lost to the same opponents in the National Division 2 league final 22-38

== Honours ==
- National Division 1 (National 2) (1): 2004-05
- National Division 2 (Federal Division) (1): 2002-03
- Coupe Falcou (3): 2004, 2005, 2016
- Paul Dejean Cup (1): 2007
