= Sporting Club Saint-Laurent Treize =

French rugby league club

Club information
- Full name: Sporting Club Saint-Laurent Treize
- Founded: 2011; 14 years ago

Current details
- Ground(s): Stade de la Gare
- Chairman: Christian Bensen, Jerome Desnarnaud
- Coach: Yannick Sibade, Damien Aussaguel
- Competition: National Division 2 (Languedoc-Rousillon Region)
- 2017/18: 5th

Uniforms
Home colours

Sporting Club Saint-Laurent Treize are a French Rugby league club based in Saint-Laurent-de-la-Cabrerisse, in the region of Pyrenees-Orientales. Founded in 2011 they play in the French National Division 2 Languedoc-Rousillon Regional League. Home games are played at the Stade de la Gare

== History ==
Sporting Club Saint-Laurent Treize were founded in 2011 by local businessmen and current chairmen Christian Bensen and Jerome Desnarnaud. In just their second season they won the Coupe Falcou and the Aude Cup and reached the National Division 2 play-offs. The following season brought yet more success when they retained the Coupe Falcou and once again reached the league play-offs. In the 2014–15 season, the club won the Coupe Falcou for the third time by defeating RC Aussillon Mazamet 22–21 in the final. In the 2016–17 season, Saint-Laurent won their fourth Coupe Falcou.

== Honours ==
- Coupe Falcou (4): 2013, 2014, 2015, 2017
