= Pamiers XIII =

French semi-professional rugby league club

Club information
- Full name: Pamiers-Vernajoul XIII
- Colours: White and Red
- Founded: 1964; 62 years ago
- Website: Website

Current details
- Ground: Stade Magnagounet
- Competition: Elite 2

Pamiers-Vernajoul XIII are a French Rugby league club based in Pamiers, Ariège department, Occitanie region.

In the 1988–89 season, Pamiers won the France Group B championship (the second tier of French rugby league) by defeating Le Barcarès XIII the final.

Following the 2021–22 season, Pamiers moved up from the Federal Division to the National Division 1. At the start of the 2023–24 season, it was announced that Pamiers were to become the reserve team for Toulouse Olympique Broncos of the Elite 1. In May 2024, Pamiers won the National Divisions Cup by defeating Salses XIII 42–22 in the final. In the National Division 1, Pamiers went undefeated through the regular season, but lost 29–26 to Realmont XIII in the final. Both clubs were promoted to the Elite 2 Championship at the start of the 2024–25 season.

== Club honours ==
- France Group B Championship
  - Winners: 1988–89
- National Divisions Cup
  - Winners: 2023–24
