= Coupe de France Albert-Falcou =

French amateur rugby league competition

- Sport: rugby league
- Founded: 1937
- Country: France
- Website: FFR XIII

The Albert Falcou Cup (French: Coupe Albert-Falcou), also called Albert Falcou French Cup (French: Coupe de France Albert-Falcou), is an annual knock-out competition organised by the Fédération Française de Rugby à XIII for amateur rugby league clubs in France.

== History ==
The competition was introduced in 1937 and was originally known as the French Amateur Cup. The inaugural winners were the short-lived La Rochelle club (during World War II the club was forced to merge with the city's rugby union club, Atlantique Stade Rochelais, by the Vichy Government of the time).

When rugby league was legalised again at the end of the war, the cup was re-instituted as the National Cup. This incarnation was contested between 1945 and 1962. Two now-defunct clubs dominated the post war years; the Biganos-based Facture XIII won the cup five times and Lavardac XIII (from the eponymous Lot-et-Garonne town), which folded in the 1980s, won it on four occasions.

The tournament was not played between 1963 and 1976.

It was relaunched in 1977 as the French Federal Cup. Since 1992, the competing clubs have vied for the Albert Falcou Cup, named in memory of audois rugby league official Albert Falcou (1911–1990), one of the main protagonists of the game's post World War II resurgence.

== Past winners ==
French Amateur Cup

- 1937 : La Rochelle XIII
- 1938 : Arcachon XIII
- 1939 : RC Saint-Gaudens

National Cup

- 1945 : Orange XIII
- 1946 : Orange XIII
- 1947 : Figeac XIII
- 1948 : RC Carpentras
- 1949 : Arachon XIII
- 1950 : Lavardac XIII
- 1951 : Lavardac XIII
- 1952 : Lavardac XIII
- 1953 : Lavardac XIII
- 1954 : La Réole XIII
- 1955 : Bordeaux Facture XIII
- 1956 : Limoux Grizzlies
- 1957 : Bordeaux Facture XIII
- 1958 : Bordeaux Facture XIII
- 1959 : Miramont XIII
- 1960 : Bordeaux Facture XIII
- 1961 : Saint-Gaudens Bears 'A'
- 1962 : Bordeaux Facture XIII

Federal Cup

- 1977 : La Réole XIII
- 1978 : Not Played
- 1979 : Montpellier Red Devils
- 1980 : AS Clairac XIII
- 1981 : Aspet XIII
- 1982 : Saint-Laurent XIII
- 1983 : US Apt XIII
- 1984 : Palau XIII Broncos
- 1985 : Not Played
- 1986 : RC Lescure-Arthes XIII
- 1987 : Sainte-Livrade XIII
- 1988 : La Réole XIII
- 1989 : Le Pontet XIII
- 1990 : Tonneins XIII
- 1991 : RC Lescure-Arthes XIII

Coupe Falcou

- 1992 : Cabestany XIII
- 1993 : Cabestany XIII
- 1994 : Sainte-Livrade XIII
- 1995 : Gifi Bias XIII
- 1996 : Saint-Cyprien
- 1997 : Morières XIII
- 1998 : Castelnau XIII
- 1999 : Le Barcarès XIII
- 2000 : Sainte-Livrade XIII
- 2001 : Palau XIII Broncos
- 2002 : Sainte-Livrade XIII
- 2003 : Gifi Bias XIII
- 2004 : Salses XIII
- 2005 : Salses XIII
- 2006 : Baroudeurs de Pia XIII
- 2007 : Sauveterre de Comminges XIII
- 2008 : Baroudeurs de Pia XIII
- 2009 : Le Barcares XIII
- 2010 : Gratentour XIII
- 2011 : Ornaisons XIII
- 2012 : US Ferrals XIII
- 2013 : Sporting Club Saint-Laurent Treize
- 2014 : Sporting Club Saint-Laurent Treize
- 2015 : Sporting Club Saint-Laurent Treize
- 2016 : Salses XIII
- 2017 : Sporting Club Saint-Laurent Treize
- 2018 : Ille-sur-Têt XIII
- 2019 : Gratentour XIII
- 2020–22 : Not played
- 2023 : Val XIII

== See also ==
- Rugby league in France
- French rugby league system
- National Division 2
- Lord Derby Cup
- Paul Dejean Cup
