= Valderiès XIII =

French rugby league club

Racing Club Valderiès XIII

Club information
- Full name: Racing Club Valderiès XIII
- Colours: Red and Green
- Founded: 1971; 55 years ago
- Website: Website

Current details
- Ground: Stade Municipal de Valderiès
- Competition: National Division 2 & 3

Racing Club Valderiès XIII are a French Rugby league club based in Valderiès, Tarn in the Midi-Pyrénées region. The club plays in the French National Division 2 & 3 and the Coupe de France Nationale.

In the 2023-24 season the club was revived after a number of years of dormancy and reached the semi-finals of National Division 4.
