= Paris-Charenton Mennecy XIII =

French rugby league club

Club information
- Full name: Paris-Charenton Mennecy XIII
- Founded: 1934; 91 years ago, 1946; 79 years ago
- Website: Website

Current details
- Ground(s): Stade Jacques Anquetil
- Competition: National Division 1
- 2017/18: 2nd

Uniforms
Home colours	Away colours

Paris-Charenton Mennecy XIII are a French rugby league club based in Paris in the Île-de-France region. The club plays in the 3rd tier National Division 1. There BC climb wear founded in 1934 then re-founded in 1946, and plays its home games at the Stade Jean-Jacques Robert

== History ==
The first rugby club in Paris were started by French students in 1879 who called themselves Paris Football Club. In the 1920s the new sport of Rugby League was first played in France and Paris emerged as a leading venue. In 1922 the Australia national rugby league team and in 1927 the New Zealand national rugby league team tried to play internationals against England national rugby league team. On both occasions the French rugby union authorities managed to get the games cancelled after threatening to boycott any stadium used. In 1933 though the French public got the chance to see rugby league played when Australia met and beat England at the Stade Pershing.

== Start & Withdrawal ==
After this historic match, Victor Breyer a prominent figure in bringing the game to Paris helped found the first official club in France, Sports Olympique de Paris, on 24 January 1934. A second team was quickly set up in Paris based around the university and called Quartier Etudiants Club. In 1934 the first French Rugby League Championship was played and a Paris club was there, namely Paris XIII. During that debut season the club didn't play a home match until 9 December because they had no ground to use amid continued pressure from the French rugby union. Eventually the club secured the Stade Buffalo. On the field the club finished 8th and reached the cup semi-finals losing to XIII Catalan 15-22. This still represents their best ever season in both league and cup. Problems continued into the second season regarding stadium use, when with the club due to meet SA Villeneuve in October, the match had to be postponed when the football club claimed the right to play on the same day. A second Parisian club, Celtic de Paris, competed in season 35/36, their only season. After finishing 9th in 1936/37 and in 1937/38 Paris XIII decided to resign from the league.

== Post-War Reformed ==
After the war in 1946 it was decided to re-form the club this time at a lower level, thus Paris XIII started in the 2nd Division. The club had to wait until the 1960s before competing for silverware. They finished runner up in the league on three occasions 1965, 1968 and 1974 relegation soon followed to the 4th tier. In season 1983/84 they were runners up again this time to US Trentels XIII. In the Paul Dejean Cup they were also runners up in 1981 and 1984. By the new millennium they were still in the 4th tier but were now called Paris-Charenton XIII and were playing at the Stade Jacques Arquetil, the newly named club won three consecutive 4th tier regional leagues in 2001, 2002 and 2003 but lost in the play-offs. Around 2012 the club changed its name again, this time to Paris-Charenton Mennecy XIII. In June 2015 long time president and former player and coach Jean Pierre Martinet died.
