= Le Mas Agenais XIII =

French rugby league club

Club information
- Full name: Le Mas Agenais XIII
- Website: Website

Current details
- Ground: Stade Municipal Norbert Tessier
- Chairman: Franck Labeyrie
- Coach: Alain Vergniol
- Competition: National Division 2 (Midi-Pyrenees Region)

Uniforms
Home colours

Le Mas Agenais XIII are a French Rugby league club based in Le Mas-d'Agenais, Lot-et-Garonne in the Aquitaine region. The club plays in the Midi-Pyrenees regional League in the French National Division 2. Home matches are played at the Stade Municipal Norbert Tessier.

== History ==
Le Mas Agenais XIII have always played in the lower reaches of the French Rugby League system. In season 74/75 they won the Federal Division now called the National Division 2 but did not go up. Since then they have finished runner-up twice, firstly in 96/97 when they lost out to Castelnau XIII 26-38 and then in season 2002/03 when they were beaten by Salses Opoul XIII 22–36. More recently they finished runner-up in the Midi-Pyrenees regional league in 2016.

== Club honours ==
- National Division 2 (Fédéral Division) (1): 1974-75
