= Villefranche XIII Aveyron =

French rugby league club

Club information
- Full name: Villefranche XIII Aveyron
- Nickname: Les Loups
- Founded: 1950; 76 years ago
- Website: Website

Current details
- Ground: Stade Henri Lagarde (2,700)
- Coach: (Cook Islands) Johnathon Ford, (Serbia) Vladica Nikolic
- Competition: Super XIII
- 2024–25: 7th

Uniforms
Home colours

Villefranche XIII Aveyron is a semi-professional rugby league club based in Villefranche-de-Rouergue, Aveyron in southern France. Formed in 1950, they currently play in the Super XIII. Their home stadium is currently the Stade Henri Lagarde.

== History ==
The club was founded in 1950 under the name Villefranche XIII, after the towns rugby union club Stade Villefranchois switched codes after several disagreements with the French rugby union authorities. On 8 January 1950 the club's president Andre Rotambourg applied to join the French rugby league and the club was accepted and began the following season in the amateur 2nd Division. In 1953 they lost the 2nd Division final 10-13 against Arcachon. Four years later they reached their only Coupe Falcou final but lost to Facture. It would take until 1962 for the club to be crowned 2nd Division champions, defeating La Reole XIII 21-3 to gain promotion to the National League 1 now the 2nd tier Elite Two. They remained in the 2nd tier until 1976 when they were relegated. They immediately won promotion back, but their stay was short-lived just the one season again.

In 1982 the club signed their first overseas players when they brought over three Australians from North Sydney Bears, Michael Glascock, Richard Lewis and Craig Ebert.

In 1990 Le Barcares XIII defeated Villefranche 12-6 in the Elite Two Championship final to deny the club promotion. The feat was achieved in 1992 when they beat Limoux Grizzlies 12-6 and won promotion. They were relegated after only twelve months and had to wait six years to return, courtesy of a 38-18 win over Saint-Cyprien in 1999. The club also changed their name to Villefranche XIII Aveyron to encompass the local area of Aveyron and a new nickname was added Les Loups (The Wolves). Financial problems off the pitch almost led to the club's demise and in 2004, they then merged with Cahors XIII to form Union Villefranche-Cahors XIII. In 2008 the club cancelled its merger with "Cahors XIII" and reverted to the club name Villefranche XIII Aveyron. By this time the club was back in the 3rd tier but in 2009 they won promotion back to the 2nd tier after beating Realmont XIII 24-20 in the National Division 1 final.

Season 2016–17 saw them finish 2nd in the table but they beat favourites and table toppers RC Baho XIII in the final 13-10 to win their first silverware for 8 years. The club runs junior and women's teams.

In the 2023–24 season, Villefranche won the Elite 2 championship by defeating Villegailhenc-Aragon XIII 37–14 in the final. Villefranche agreed to move up to the Super XIII for the 2024–25 season.

== Crest ==
The Villefranche XIII Aveyron club's crest of the wolf was most likely selected because of the Cévennes National Park a local tourist attraction in Aveyron where wolves are sometimes seen, although numbers have decreased greatly over the years. There is also a local folklore story about a Beast of Gevaudan that would reside in and around the local areas, with many tales describing the beast as a large wolf or wolf-like creature.

== Stadium ==
The Stade Henri Lagarde is a rugby stadium in Villefranche with one main stand with a cinder track and perimeter fence around the pitch.

== Current squad ==
Squad for the 2026-2027 Super XIII season.

- (France) Yassine Al Ghannoufi (Prop)
- (France) Morgan Andral (Hooker)
- (France) Gabriel Bouscayrol (Hooker)
- (France) Shann Brugel (Wing)
- (Australia) Campbell Duffy (Lock)
- (France) Hakim Ed Dermoune (Hooker)
- (New Zealand) James Flack (Prop)
- (France) Mathias Gimenez (Prop)
- (France) Jeremy Ginestet (Second-row)
- (France) Christopher Hellec (Halfback)
- (France) Simon Juarez (Centre)
- (France) Jean Marques (Hooker)
- (France) Romain Pallares (Halfback)
- (France) Aymeric Papailhau (Five-eighth)
- (Samoa) Dominique Peyroux (Second-row)
- (Italy) Radean Robinson (Halfback)
- (France) Jordan Rubio (Second-row)
- (France) Paul Sangare (Prop)
- (France) Kevin Sournac (Prop)
- (Fiji) Tevita Toloi (Centre)
- (France) Louis Trainer (Centre)
- (France) Noe Trainer (Prop)
- (France) Romain Verdie (Centre)

== Internationals ==
- France
  - Yves Bégou 3 Apps (15 in total)
  - Jean Pierre Sauret 7 Apps (16 in total)
  - Jacques Gayral 1 App
  - Francis Theron 9 Apps
  - Christian Laumond 10 Apps (11 in total)
  - Patrick Wosniak 2 Apps (3 in total)
  - Charles Frison 2 Apps (3 in total)
  - Mikhail Piskunov 1 App
  - Jason Sands 7 Apps

== Notable players ==
The following is a list of professional or international rugby league players who have played for Villefranche XIII Aveyron:

- Jared Taylor
- Leroy Rivett
- Ray Nasso
- Mark Faumuina

== Honours ==
- Elite Two Championship (4): 1991-92, 1998–99, 2016–17, 2023–24
- 2nd Division (1): 1961-62
- National Division 1 (1): 2008-09
