= Ornaisons XIII =

Defunct French rugby league club

Ornaisons XIII were a French Rugby league club based in Ornaisons, Aude in the Languedoc-Roussillon region. The club played in the lower leagues of French rugby league and were the reserve team of Elite One Championship club Lézignan Sangliers.

== Honours ==
- National Division 1 (1): 2006–07
- National Division 2 / Federal Division (4): 1977–78, 1985–86, 2004–05, 2010–11
