= French rugby league system =

- Country: France
- Sport: Rugby league
- Promotion and relegation: Yes

National system
- Federation: French Rugby League Federation
- Confederation: European Rugby League
- Top division: Super XIII
- Second division: Elite 2
- Cup competition: Lord Derby Cup

The French rugby league system is a four tiered structure with the major national club competition being the Super XIII. Below this is Elite 2 and a number of regional leagues. The teams in each competition can change each year depending on final standings and relegation/promotion.

There is no set structure for promotion and relegation. If a club wants to go up or down a level then they will consult the Fédération Française de Rugby à XIII who will make the decision.

French clubs can also apply to the Rugby Football League to compete in any level of the British rugby league system.

== Super XIII ==
Known as the Elite 1 until 2024, Super XIII it is the top tier of rugby league in France and sees teams relegated to and promoted from the Elite 2 Championship. In the 2024–2025 season Super XIII has eleven teams.

== Elite 2 ==
Elite 2 is the second tier of rugby league in France. Winning teams are promoted to Super XIII, providing they meet stadium/financial requirements. Team's finishing bottom can be relegated to the National Division. In the 2024–2025 season there are nine teams in the division.

== National Division 1 ==
The National Division is the third tier of French rugby league. In the 2024–2025 season it has 8 teams.

== National Division 2/3 ==
For the 2024–2025 season, the National Division 2/3 season is played in two phases with 25 teams initially divided into six pools and then reorganised into two divisions based on their ranking after the first phase.

== Pyramid ==
Level	League(s)/Division(s)
1	Super XIII; 11 clubs
2	Elite 2; 9 clubs
3	National Division 1; 8 clubs
4	National Division 2/3; 25 clubs

== French teams to play in the British RFL ==
- Catalans Dragons: Super League (2006–present)
- Toulouse Olympique: Super League (2022; 2026–present), Championship (2009–2011; 2017–2021; 2023–2025), League 1 (2016)
- PSG: Super League (1996–1997) defunct

=== Super League ===
As of 2022 France has two teams competing on the British Super League – Catalans Dragons and Toulouse Olympique. There is no automatic promotion and relegation between Super League and French domestic leagues, and Transitions between the leagues is done by Application to the Rugby Football League. Catalans Dragons have been a Super League team since their application was approved ahead of the 2006 season, whereas Toulouse played in the 2022 season after gaining promotion from the lower British divisions, however were relegated the season after. Toulouse regained promotion in for 2026. PSG also competed in Super League for two seasons between 1996 and 1997.

=== Championship ===
Toulouse Olympique are the only French team to have played in the Championship, playing two seasons in 2009 and 2010, before rejoining the French league system. They spent a further five years between 2017 and 2021, after reapplication to the British rugby league system saw them enter at League 1. They spent one year in the British third division, and were promoted to the Super League following winning the 2021 Championship Grand Final, which they repeated in 2025.

=== League 1 ===
Toulouse Olympique are the only French team to have competed in League 1, having done so in 2016.

== See also ==
- Rugby league in France
- Australian rugby league system
- British rugby league system
- France national rugby league team
- France women's national rugby league team
- French Rugby League Championship
- Lord Derby Cup
- Coupe Falcou
- Paul Dejean Cup
