= Toulouges XIII Panthers =

French rugby league club

Club information
- Full name: Toulouges XIII Panthers
- Nickname: Panthers
- Founded: 2009; 17 years ago

Current details
- Ground: Stade Clairfont
- Coach: Olivier Mendes and David Montoya
- Competition: National Division 2 (Languedoc-Rousillon Region)
- 2017/18: 8th

Uniforms
Home colours

Toulouges XIII Panthers are a French Rugby league club based in Toulouges in the southern region of Pyrenees-Orientales. The club plays in the Languedoc-Rousillon regional National Division 2 league. Home games are played at the Stade Clairfont.

== History ==
Toulouges XIII Panthers or as they are also known ETC XIII were originally a junior team and were part of the Catalans Dragons youth system. Whereby they would nurture talent before hopefully leading them to the Dragons first team squad. In 2009 it was decided to form a senior side to aid with the pathway. The club have always played in the French league's 4th tier. The junior side of the team have won many honours since their formation in 2002. The juniors have lifted the title on 5 occasions in 2004, 05, 06, 07 and 2012 along with the cup in 2004 and 2007. The cadet side have been crowned league champs in 2006, 2009 and 2012 as well as lifting the cup in 2006 and 2009. The club are still part of the Catalan Dragons youth system.

== See also ==
- National Division 2
