= National Division 2 =

French fourth tier rugby league competition

- Founded: 1974
- Country: France
- Number of clubs: 24
- Level on pyramid: 4
- Promotion to: National Division 1
- Domestic cup: Lord Derby Cup
- League cup: Coupe Falcou

National Division 2 is the fourth tier of rugby league in France, below the National Division 1. The season runs from September to April. The Division is split into 5 regional leagues, East, South 1, South 2, South-East, South-West and West. Clubs play each other home and away in their respective regional league with the top clubs progressing into a series of play-off matches to determine the champions. The champions can apply for promotion to the National Division 1. This tier was formerly known as the Federal Championship.

== History ==
The league was first played for in 1974/75 under the title Federal Division. In 2008 the competition was rebranded as the National Division 2. The domestic cup for clubs in the league is the Coupe Falcou which was formerly called the French Federal Cup.

In 2023, the Federal and National Division merged in a restructuring of the French rugby league system. For the 2023–24 season there were four National Divisions grouped in pairs: National Division 1 & 2 and National Division 3 & 4. The lower divisions took the place of the Federal Division and clubs in Division 4 had the option of playing nine-a-side matches. In the first part of the season teams were divided into regional pools from which they qualified for the finals stage. In the 2024–25 season, the league was altered again to have a single National Division 1 and, following the withdrawal of several clubs, a National Division 2/3.

== Teams ==
National Division 2/3 teams for the 2024–25 season:

- Tonneins XIII 2
- La Réole/Bègles
- XIII Gascon
- US Trentels XIII
- Toulouse JJ
- Valderiès XIII
- Ecole du XIII St Pierrais
- US Villeneuvoise XIII
- Belvèze/Razes
- Pamiers XIII 2
- Villeneuve Minervois XIII
- Gratentour XIII
- AS Clairac XIII
- Le Barcarès XIII Laurentin Baroudeur
- VAL 13
- XIII Catalan
- Montpellier XIII
- Paris Châtillon XIII
- Lyon
- Racing Club Caumont XIII
- SU Cavaillon XIII
- US Apt XIII
- Nice XIII
- Corbeil XIII
- Montpellier Hérault Rugby League

== Past winners ==
Year	Champions	Score	Runner-up
1974-75	Le Mas Agenais XIII		
1975-76			
1976-77			
1977-78	Ornaisons XIII	23-20	Lestelle XIII
1978-79	La Reole XIII	19-6	Talence XIII
1979-80	Saint-Juéry XIII	29-3	US Pineuilh XIII
1980-81	Pennautier XIII	10-7	Rivesaltes XIII
1981-82	Saint-Paul Fenouilledes XIII	13-3	SC Cheval-Blanc XIII
1982-83	RC Le Soler XIII	47-0	RC Lescure-Arthes XIII
1983-84	US Trentels XIII	15-10	Paris XIII
1984-85	Mazan XIII	19-8	Opoul XIII
1985-86	Ornaisons XIII	16-10	Salses XIII
1986-87	Le Barcares XIII	16-9	Villegailhenc-Aragon XIII
1987-88	Mazan XIII	18-10	Narbonne XIII
1988-89	Opoul XIII	27-12	Saint-Hyppolite XIII
1989-90	Palau XIII Broncos	28-12	Cabestany XIII
1990-91	Saint Esteve 'A'	16-8	US Villeneuve 'A'
1991-92	Le Barcares XIII	19-6	US Apt XIII
1992-93	Le Lauquet/Palaja XIII	18-15	Villegailhenc-Aragon XIII
1993-94	Morieres XIII	25-12	Estagel XIII
1994-95	AS Clairac XIII	20-12	Ille-sur-Tet XIII
1995-96	Saint-Cyprien	30-13	Castelnau XIII
1996-97	Castelnau XIII	38-26	Le Mas Agenais XIII
1997-98	AS Clairac XIII	23-17	Cabardes XIII
1998-99	Montpellier Red Devils	30-15	Ille-sur-Tet XIII
1999-2000			
2000-01	Saint-Paul Fenouilledes XIII		
2001-02	Gifi Bias XIII	18-10	Aspet XIII
2002-03	Salses Opoul	36-22	Le Mas Agenais XIII
2003-04	Racing Club Caumont XIII	26-24	Villeneuve Tolosane
2004-05	Ornaisons XIII	28-11	SU Cavaillon XIII
2005-06	Sauveterre de Comminges XIII	20-14	Tonneins XIII
2006-07	AS Clairac XIII	30-8	Saint-Laurent XIII
2007-08	Baroudeurs de Pia XIII	30-6	RC Lescure-Arthes XIII 'A'
2008-09			
2009-10			
2010-11	Ornaisons XIII	41–26	US Ferrals XIII
2011-12	Le Soler XIII	23-12	US Trentels XIII
2012-13	AS Clairac XIII		US Ferrals XIII
2013-14	Ramonville XIII		RC Lescure-Arthes XIII 'A'
2014-15			
2015-16	US Pujols XIII	38-22	Salses XIII
2016-17	Pia XIII	28-10	Le Soler XIII
2017-18			
2018-19			

== See also ==
- French rugby league system
- Rugby league in France
- Lord Derby Cup
- Coupe Falcou
- Paul Dejean Cup
