= Rugby league in France =

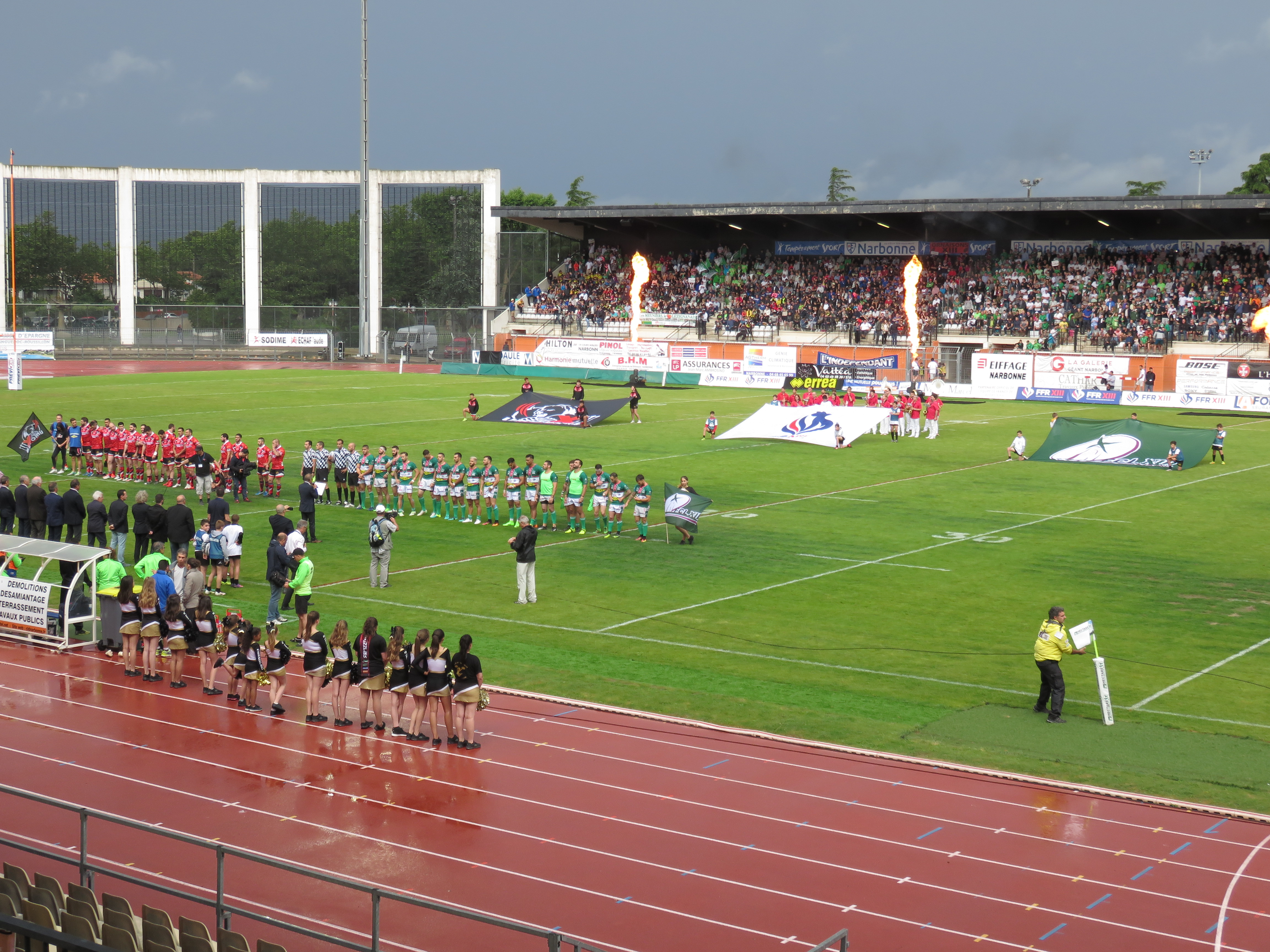
- The Grand Final of the Elite One Championship 2016–2017
- Country: France
- Governing body: Fédération Française de Rugby à XIII
- National team: France
- Nickname: The Chanticleers (for the Anglophone media) or les Bleus or les Tricolores
- First played: 1934
- Registered players: 10,315

National competitions
- Rugby League World Cup; Four Nations

Club competitions
- Super XIII; Elite 2 Lord Derby Cup

Rugby league has been played in France since 1934. As with rugby union, rugby league was introduced by the English and the heartland of the game is in the south of France.

During the Second World War, in association with the French Rugby Federation (FFR), the sport was banned by the Vichy government, an act from which the code has struggled to recover. There has been a recent resurgence of the sport following the admission of Catalans Dragons and Toulouse Olympique to the professional RFL system, with Catalans a mainstay in the Super League who most recently made the Grand Final in 2023.

In 2025, there were approximately 10,000 active participants.

== History ==
=== Introduction of the sport to WWII ===
Rugby football was introduced into France by the British in the early 1870s. It began to flourish quickly in the poorer, more rural south. The French rugby clubs remained aligned with the Home Nation unions when rugby split into Rugby Union and Northern Union (later renamed Rugby League) in 1895.

Allegations of professionalism and on-field violence in internationals led to France's suspension from the rugby union Five Nations Championship in 1931. Following development work by both Harry Sunderland (on behalf of the Australian Rugby League) and the British Rugby Football League, the Australian and British Test teams played an exhibition game at Stade Pershing in Paris in late December 1933. An earlier exhibition match between the two teams had been attempted to be played in Paris during the 1921-22 Kangaroo tour of Great Britain, but this had been blocked by the FFR. Then in 1934, Jean Galia took a French team that had never played rugby league to Yorkshire and Lancashire in England. The French Rugby League was formed on 6 April 1934.

With France's continued suspension from the Five Nations Championship preventing its players from participating in quality international competition, many began to consider the newly introduced 13-man code. With rugby league's acceptance of professionalism and spectator-friendly rules, the French viewed it as a modern and innovative game, and it grew quickly in popularity. Within five years, the number of rugby league clubs was approaching the number of rugby union clubs. By 1939, the French league had 225 clubs and the national side beat England and Wales to take the 1938-39 European Championship, their first. In the same year, three leading rugby union clubs – Narbonne, Carcassonne and Brive – switched to rugby league.

The invasion of France by Germany in May 1940 divided the country into Occupied France in the north and a southern pro-Nazi Vichy France, the latter of which roughly corresponded to the rugby-playing heartlands. The Vichy Government under Philippe Pétain associated rugby league with the pre-war socialist government, the United Kingdom and General Charles de Gaulle. Some of the French Rugby Union's senior administrators took advantage of their close relationship with the new regime to have rugby league outlawed as a "corrupter" of French youth. All funds as well as grounds and equipment belonging to the French Rugby League Federation were confiscated and handed over to rugby union. The figure of assets stripped has been estimated at two million 1940 French francs, none of which was ever returned. In addition, rugby league players were forced to switch to rugby union or other sports or quit sport altogether.

The banning of rugby league was "decided in 1941, by the Director of Sports [Colonel Pascot], who was himself a rugby union player, and who was convinced that the disappearance of rugby league would favour the development of rugby [union]".

The federation was reinstated in September 1944, but the damage caused by the Vichy Government's actions proved to be long-lasting and rugby league struggled to regain its pre-war momentum.

=== Post-war to the present ===
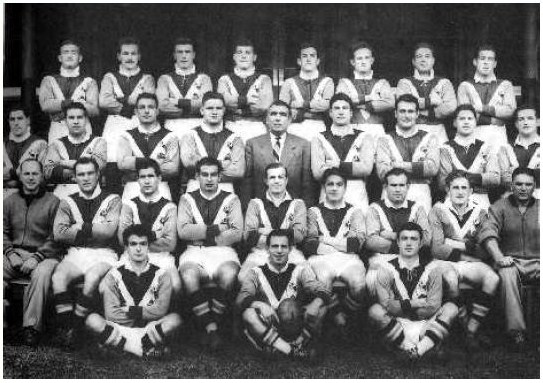
The France national rugby league team in 1951

On 10 July 1947, a "gentleman's agreement" was signed between the Ligue Française de rugby à treize (Paul Barrière as representative), the French republic and the French rugby union for division of the Ligue Française de rugby à treize in two parts: a Federation française de jeu à treize as the governing body of the amateur game and a Ligue de rugby à XIII as the governing body for the semi-professional game. Although the ban on rugby league was lifted, it was prevented from using the word rugby in its title from 24 April 1949 until 26 June 1991, having to use the name Jeu à Treize (Game of Thirteen). Rugby league remained banned in schools and was limited to 200 professional players under this dubious arrangement.

After the war the French game was re-established and the French became one of rugby league's major powers. France was the driving force behind the establishment of the Rugby League World Cup following the war. The first Rugby League World Cup was held in France in 1954; the final at Parc des Princes was narrowly lost by France 12–16 to a young, underdog Great Britain. France played major international series against Great Britain, Australia and New Zealand. In 1951 and 1955, the France national team toured Australia and won both Test series 2–1; these squads are still regarded as two of the strongest sides ever to tour Australia.

The French maintained an excellent record in international rugby league until the 1980s, triumphing over Australia again in the home 1967-68 series and finishing as runner-up to Australia in the 1968 Rugby League World Cup. The Chanticleers also defeated Australia in the home 1978 Test series by 2 Tests to nil - a feat not repeated over Australia by another international team until the 2005 Rugby League Tri-Nations series win by New Zealand. Their competitiveness against Australia, Great Britain and New Zealand began to decline in the 1980s and they have yet to recover their former strength, with their last win over one of those teams being in 1990 against Great Britain.

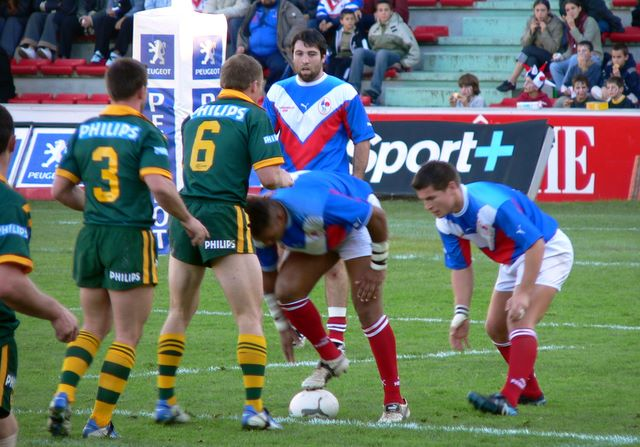
France playing Australia, November 2004

The original proposal for the Super League in 1995 was for two French clubs, with both Paris and Toulouse being proposed. This was subsequently reduced to one, after much discussion among clubs. In February 1996, a French team, Paris Saint-Germain was formed to take part in the otherwise English Super League. The players being drawn from the French league. It was abandoned in October 1997, partly because Paris was not in the southern heartland of French rugby league and partly because the players had the double burden of playing for both Paris and their original club.

In 1998, XIII Actif were formed under the Chairmanship of French rugby league historian Robert Fassolette, to put pressure on the French government over the Vichy banning of the sport and the return of stolen assets. The French Minister of Sport commissioned an enquiry, which found in favour of XIII Actif but nothing was done to ameliorate the damage done to rugby league.

The Court then ruled that only the French rugby league federation could take action under its former name - a name it had been forced to change.

Professional rugby league returned to France in February 2006 when Perpignan-based club Catalans Dragons joined Super League. They provided French rugby league with a major boost by demonstrating their prowess before nearly 85,000 people at Wembley in the Final of the 2007 Rugby League Challenge Cup. In 2018 they won the RL Challenge Cup, beating Warrington Wolves 20 - 14 before a 50,672 crowd at Wembley.

In 2022, France were awarded hosting duties for the 2025 Rugby League World Cup. However, in 2023, they withdrew as hosts.

== Governing body ==
Since 26 June 1991 the governing body for rugby league in France has been the Fédération Française de Rugby à XIII (i.e. formerly Ligue Française de Rugby à XIII then, Fédération Française de Jeu à XIII). The Federation is a founding member of and a full member of the Rugby League International Federation (i.e. IRLB Jan. 1948) and of the Rugby League European Federation (i.e. May 2003).

== Competitions ==
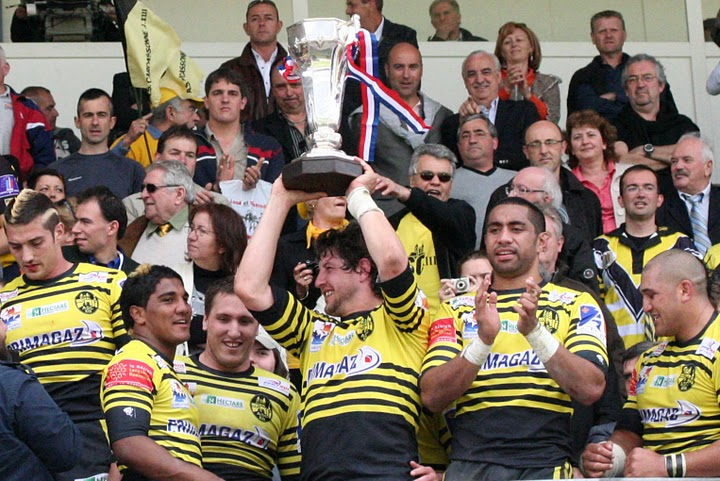
AS Carcassonne, who are France's most successful team, won their thirteenth league title in 2024. They are pictured here after winning the Lord Derby Cup in 2009.

The French Rugby League Championship has been the major rugby league tournament for semi-professional clubs in France since the sport was introduced to the country in the 1930s. The championship is divided into several divisions; the top league being Super XIII (known as Elite 1 until 2024), below that is the Elite 2 championship. There are several lower and regional divisions below them. The premier knock-out cup is the Lord Derby Cup and there is the Coupe Falcou for National Division One and Federal clubs.

At its height, the French Championship maintained teams from the cities of Paris, Marseille, Lyon, Bordeaux and Toulouse, as well as the rugby league towns of Carcassonne, Avignon, Lezignan, Albi, Villeneuve and Perpignan.

=== French teams in the RFL ===
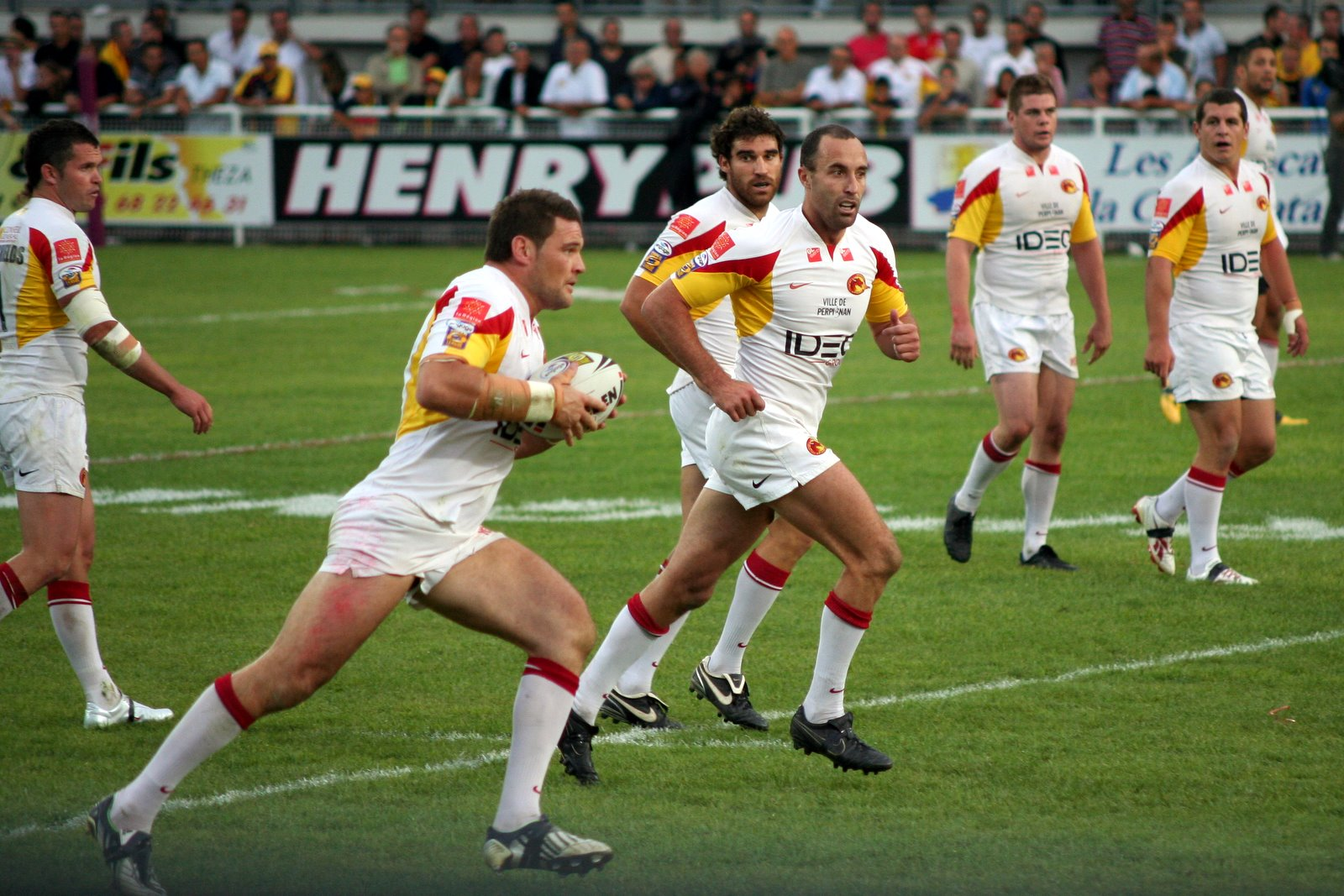
Catalans Dragons are France's most successful team to compete in the RFL

French teams may apply to the RFL to play in tiers one, two, or three of the British rugby league system (providing they meet certain criteria) as this is generally considered a higher standard of rugby league.

In addition French teams also take part in the Rugby League Challenge Cup, with Catalans Dragons (formerly known as Union Treiziste Catalan), Toulouse Olympique, Limoux Grizzlies, and Pia having done so.

In terms of league membership, Catalans Dragons play in the Super League, and have done so since 2006. Toulouse Olympique also bid for a Super League franchise in 2009 but were rejected. They were however accepted in the second-tier Championship, and played two mostly unsuccessful seasons in that league before returning to the French league in 2012. Toulouse Olympique later returned to the British league system, beginning play in the third-tier League 1 in 2016 and earning promotion to the Championship for 2017. The city of Toulouse maintains a presence in the French leagues through Toulouse Olympique Broncos, which have been the official reserve side for Toulouse Olympique since being taken over by that club in 2012.

In 2021, Catalans and Toulouse made history as both sides won the League Leaders' Shield for the Super League and Championship respectively. This marked the first time that a French side had won either division. Toulouse later went on to win the Million Pound Game, thus gaining promotion to the Super League. Toulouse were relegated in 2022.

Teams that have played in RFL leagues are summarised below:

Team	Current Division	Stadium	City/Area	Founded	Time in RFL
PSG	—N/a	Stade Sébastien Charléty	Paris	1995	1996–1997
Catalans Dragons	Super League	Stade Gilbert Brutus	Perpignan, Pyrénées-Orientales	2000 (XIII Catalan, 1935)	2006 – present
Toulouse Olympique	Super League	Stade Ernest-Wallon	Toulouse	1937	2009–2010; 2016 – present

== Popularity ==
Division of popularity of Rugby League (red) and Rugby Union (blue) by department in 2009.

Rugby league is most popular in the south of France. The game struggles for attention in the national media, but it is covered by regional outlets in the south. However, the introduction of Catalans Dragons into Super League in 2006 and Toulouse Olympique into RFL Championship in 2009 has seen increased coverage with articles appearing in national newspapers such as L'Équipe, Libération and Le Figaro. As of 2025, there were approximately 10,000 active participants.

== National teams ==
=== Men's national team ===
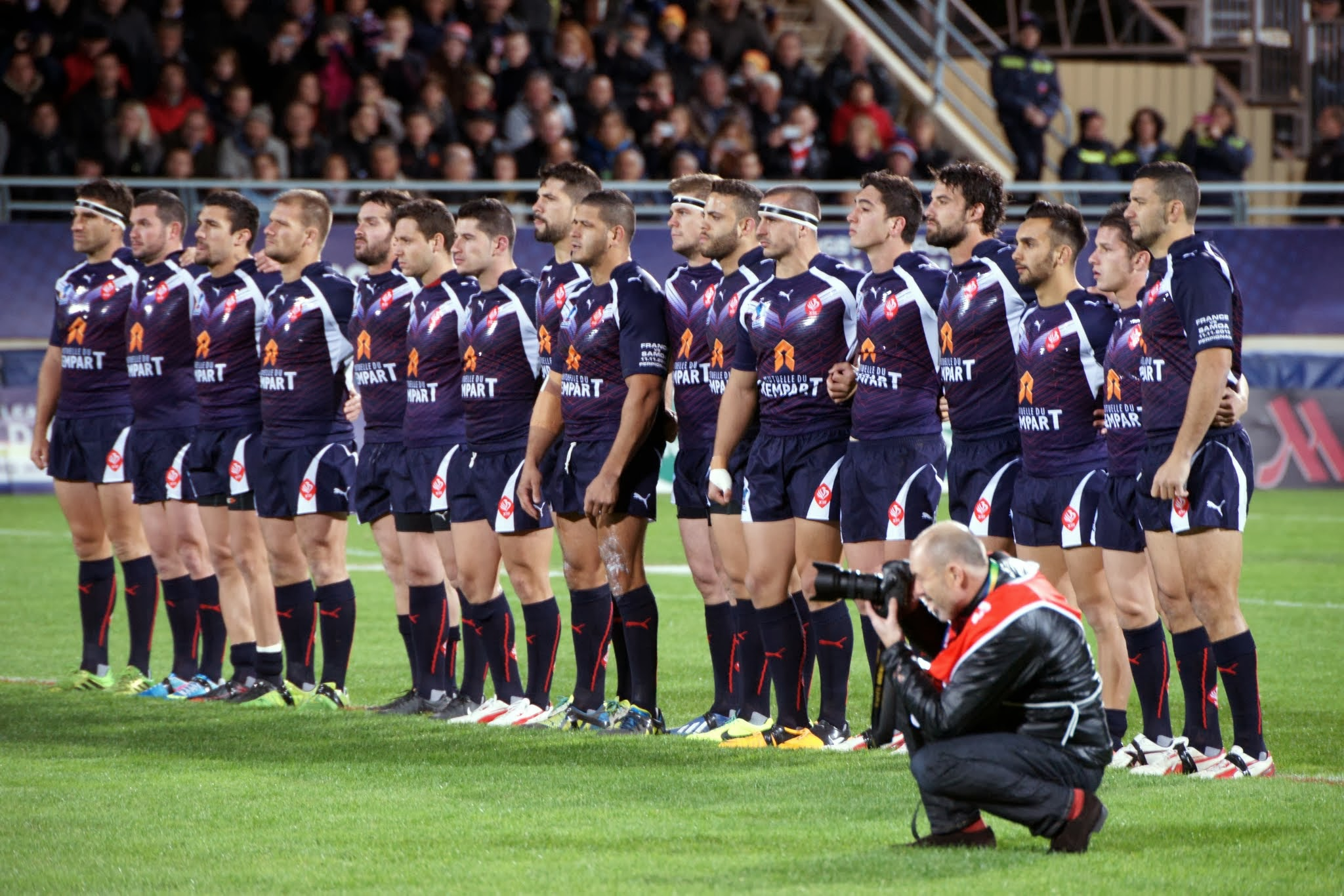
The France national rugby league team during the 2013 Rugby League World Cup

Locally, the France national rugby league team are often nicknamed les Bleus, after the colour of their home jersey or as les Tricolores. They have competed in every World Cup and Rugby League European Cup, as well as playing in other tournaments such as the Victory Cup.

In 2009, it was announced that France would enter the Tri-Nations tournament as a fourth team (necessitating its renaming to the Rugby League Four Nations), playing alongside Australia, New Zealand and England. The introduction of Catalans Dragons into the Super League and recent strong performances from the international side led to this decision. Until the tournament's suspension in 2017, the winner of the Rugby League European Cup qualified as the fourth team when the competition was held in the northern hemisphere and the winner of the Pacific Cup was the fourth team when it was held in the southern hemisphere. 2009 remains the only year France has played in this tournament.

The French territory of New Caledonia had its own rugby league team from 2003 to 2006, which was run by the Fédération Francaise de Rugby à Treize.

=== Women's national team ===
The France women's national rugby league team, also known as the Chanticleers ( for the Anglophone media) or locally as Les Tricolores, represents France in Women's rugby league. They are administered by the French Rugby League Federation.

=== Wheelchair national team ===
The France national wheelchair rugby league team represent France at wheelchair rugby league. They have competed at the World Cup since the inaugural competition in 2008 and won the tournament in 2013 and 2017.

== Media ==
=== Television ===
Unlike, for instance, the BBC, France Television don't offer any programme to the French public about Rugby League. This has been a real issue for the game. Explanations usually given are the low number of participants in France but also pressure which would be made by the Union authorities on the French Public Television Group.

In the early 2000s, Orange TV showed every Catalans Dragons home match live. Selected games from the Elite Championship were also broadcast live on Orange TV and summaries of each match Elite 1 were available to subscribers. They also broadcast some of Toulouse Olympique's home games live. Orange TV had also secured to rights to broadcast Super League, the Four Nations and the European Cup in 2009.

In 2010, Direct 8 gained the rights to four international matches involving France: a test match against England on 12 June and the three French games of the 2010 European Cup. This marked the first time rugby league has been shown on French free-to-air television for at least two decades.

Afterwards, in the 2010s, Rugby League was confined to the pay television again: Beinsport has been broadcasting the NRL games and televised the Catalan Dragons Super League matches with an interruption in 2019.

In the early 2020s, some Elite 1 games are televised by a local channel Vià Occitanie; this is a free-to-air channel in the South of France but they are also available on the internet and via the triple play internet devices. Therefore, they offer, indirectly, a nationwide coverage of the domestic championship.

Presently, French clubs have to fund the broadcast of their own games (e.g., Dragons Catalans) or to televise their own matches themselves via the social networks or YouTube.

=== Radio ===
Radio Marseillette has rugby league debate and news every Saturday from 10:00 to 12:00. They also have exclusive live commentary of all Catalans Dragons home matches and Toulouse Olympique home matches. They also have commentary on some Elite League games.

Radio France Bleu Roussillon carries commentary on every Catalans Dragons away match played in the UK.

=== Press ===
The French national mainstream media barely follow the game. Very occasionally, some articles about the sport are published in newspapers such as Le Monde, Le Figaro or the national Sport newspaper L'Équipe.

Nevertheless, there is undoubtedly a French specificity : the Weekly Rugby Union magazine Midi Olympique has a one-page section devoted to Rugby League. However, only two local newspapers genuinely cover the game; L'Indépendant ( based in the South of France) and la Dépêche du Midi ( based in the South west of the country).

== See also ==
- French rugby league system
- Sport in France
- Rugby union in France
