= US Pujols XIII =

French semi-professional rugby league club

Club information
- Full name: Union Sportive Pujols XIII
- Nickname(s): The Lions
- Founded: 2014; 11 years ago

Current details
- Ground(s): Lacassagne Sports Complex
- Competition: National Division 1
- 2018/19: 3rd

Uniforms
Home colours

US Pujols XIII are a French Rugby league club based in Pujols, Lot-et-Garonne in the south-west of France. The club plays in National Division 1. Home games are played at the Lacassagne Sports Complex.

== History ==
Founded in 2014, US Pujols XIII can trace their history back through former Rugby League club Gifi Bias XIII who moved from their former base in Bias relocating to Pujols and becoming US Pujols XIII. The new club didn't have too long to wait for their first silverware as in just their second season they won the National Division 2 title after beating Salses XIII in the final 38-22. The following season after accepting promotion they finished 3rd and reached the final where they beat Realmont XIII 26-23.

== Club Honours ==
- National Division 2 (1): 2015-16
- National Division 1 (1): 2016-17
