= Villeneuve Minervois XIII =

French rugby league club

Club information
- Full name: Villeneuve Minervois XIII
- Nickname(s): Les Aigles
- Founded: 2008; 17 years ago

Current details
- Ground(s): Stade Vitali Cros
- Chairman: Alain Ginies
- Competition: National Division 1

Uniforms
Home colours	Away colours

Villeneuve Minervois XIII are a French Rugby league team based in Villeneuve-Minervois in the region of Aude in the south of France. Founded in 2008 they currently compete in the National Division 1. Home games are played at the Stade Vitali Cros.

Founded in 2008 by current chairman Alain Ginies the club entered the French Rugby League pyramid at the 3rd tier National Division 1 level after a league re-structure. In season 2015/16 the club enjoyed their best campaign finishing 3rd

== Current squad ==
Squad for 2022-23 season;

- Julien Agullo – Hooker
- Clement Arrans
- Mathieu Bardou
- Yassine Belkacemi
- Mehdi Belkoniene
- Jeremy Bernardo
- Clement Cartier – Five-eighth
- Sebastien Chapelet
- Tristan De Souza
- Benjamin Diaz – Wing
- Leopold Eldine – Wing
- Mounir El Jaghmati
- Romain Frezouls
- Guillaume Gres
- Ismail Jyed
- Yacine Laaras
- Brandon Lo
- Remi Loup
- Matthias Martinez
- Mickael Mayans
- Kevin Prainito
- Abdessamad Rachid – Prop
- Terrence Rouibah
- Christophe Second – Centre
- Jonathan Soum – Hooker
- Julien Talieu – Fullback
- Damien Tetart – Prop
- Florent Tost – Wing
- Theau Traquini
- Geoffrey Zava – Prop
- Fahed Zine – Prop
