= RC Baho XIII =

French semi-professional rugby league club

Club information
- Full name: Racing Club Baho XIII
- Nickname: Les Geckos
- Founded: 2008; 18 years ago
- Website: Official site

Current details
- Ground: Stade Municipal de Baho (Stade Michel Bardes)
- Chairman: Colette Tigneres
- Coach: Didier Meynard
- Manager: Christophe Blachier

Uniforms
Home colours	Away colours

Racing Club Baho XIII who are more commonly known as RC Baho XIII are a semi-professional rugby league team based in the town of Baho in the region of Pyrenees-Orientales in southern France. Their home ground is the Stade Municipal de Baho and they are coached by Didier Meynard.

== History ==
During the mid eighties RC Baho XIII reached three consecutive National 2 now called National Division 1 finals. Losing the first one in season 84/85 against Palau XIII Broncos 15-24, they gained revenge in 1985/86 beating Palau XIII Broncos 34-20, then lost 6-7 against US Trentels XIII in 1987. This sudden burst of finals appearances was quickly extinguished and the club wouldn't reach another final for another 22 years. 2008/09 was the season when the club would embark on another flurry of finals appearances but this time with more success and for a more sustained period and at the higher second tier level the Elite Two Championship. In that first season they finished runner-up behind Corbeil XIII having lost the final 14-30, semi-finalists the following season was followed by another runners-up spot losing this time to RC Lescure-Arthes XIII 0-12. After another semi-final appearance in 2011/12 more disappointment followed the next season when they had to settle for runner-up again, losing on this occasion to their rivals from the eighties, Palau XIII Broncos 22-26, Finally in 2013/14 they lifted the title when they beat the favourites Albi RL XIII 18-12. Semi-finalists in 2015 preceded a 5th place in 2015/16. The following season the club finished top of the table again but were beaten in the final by Villefranche XIII Aveyron. Back in 2009 the club set up its first rugby school and in 2014 the juniors won the Coupe de France Tarbouriech (National Juniors).

In July 2023, with the club suffering from financial difficulties, it was announced that they had withdrawn from the Elite 2 championship and that the club would go dormant for the 2023–24 season. In August 2023, the formation of a new club, Toulouges-Baho Falcons, was announced. The new venture proved successful in their first season with the Falcons winning the National Division 3 by defeating Villeneuve Minervois XIII 28–6 in the final.

== Stadium ==
The club have always played at the Stade Municipal de Baho a ground owned by the local town council. Both rugby and football are played. A renovation took place in 2015 which included the installing of three small seating stands each holding 70 spectators.

== Honours ==
- Elite Two (2): 2013-14, 2018–19
- National 2 (National Division 1) (1): 1985-86
