= Montpellier Red Devils =

French semi-professional rugby league club

Montpellier XIII

Club information
- Full name: Montpellier XIII Red Devils
- Nickname(s): Red Devils
- Founded: 1953; 72 years ago
- Website: Site

Current details
- Ground(s): Stade du Pont (1953–1971), Stade Sabathé (1971–) (8,000 (2,800 seated))
- CEO: Thierry Arcas
- Chairman: Audrey Woelfing
- Coach: Audrey Zitter
- Captain: Arnaud Barthes
- Competition: National Division 2 (Zone 1)

Uniforms
Home colours	Away colours

Montpellier XIII Red Devils ( fr:Montpellier Diables Rouges Rugby a XIII ) are a semi-professional rugby league club based in Montpellier, in the region of Herault, France. They currently play in the National Division 2. Their home ground is the Stade Sabathé.

== History ==
Founded in 1953 as Montpellier Diables Rouges and named after the first club side to tour France in the 1930s, Salford, who were nicknamed the Diables Rouges in reference to their red playing shirts, Montpellier reached the top tier in 1957 and until the 1990s very little else occurred apart from them moving grounds in 1971 when their original stadium the Stade du Pont was closed down and demolished. For season 1997/98, heavy recruitment began with the intent of getting the club back to the top tier. Players like Australian Steven Bye, along with talented local players like Cobos, Simon, Bouteloup, Trinquier and David Fraysse, were brought to the club. In 1998-99, they won their first trophy, the Federal Championship now called National Division 2 beating Ille-sur-Tet XIII 30-15 and that was followed the following season when they won the National 2 now called National Division 1 the 3rd tier, they beat Ille-sur-Tet XIII again and Cabardes XIII in the play-offs before beating Homps XIII in the final 40-4 earning promotion to the 2nd tier. They would spend the next ten years in the Elite Two Championship, they were runner-up in 2008 to Le Bacares XIII, until season 2009-10. In that season the club finished runner-up behind Palau XIII Broncos and then lost to them in the play-off final 12-18 but were promoted to the top tier when their victors declined. The following season the club struggled in the Elite One Championship eventually finishing 10th and bottom with just two wins. The following season was the same with just two wins collected and the club was back in the 2nd tier. Worse was to come when the club after a tumultuous season went under. A new club was quickly reformed as Montpellier XIII and started life in the National Division 1, the 3rd tier. At the end of season 2013/14 the club was back in the 2nd tier

The club runs both youth and ladies teams.

== Stadium ==
The Stade du Pont was the club's first home ground, built in 1923 with a 10,000 capacity, the ground was used until 1971 when it was demolished to make way for housing and a shopping centre. The ground was also used by football club Stade Olympique Montpellier from 1923. At its peak the stadium had two stands down the length of the pitch with open ended earthen banks behind the sticks giving it an 18,000 capacity. A storm in 1963 caused much damage to the two stands. In 1971 the club moved to their current home the Stade Sabathe but had to use a secondary stadium, Stade Veyrassi, since the use of Stade Sabathe was granted to the local Rugby Union, the MRC. The stadium is a rugby ground with an 8,000 capacity of which 2,800 are seated.

== Honours ==
- Federal Championship (National Div 2) (1): 1998-99
- National 2 (National Div 1) (1): 1999-2000
