= RC Carpentras XIII =

French semi-professional rugby league club

Club information
- Full name: Racing Club de Carpentras XIII du Comtat
- Nickname(s): The Bulls
- Founded: 1938; 87 years ago

Current details
- Ground(s): Stade Municipal (1938–1947), Stade de la Roseraie (1947–) (5,000 (700 seated))
- Coach: Jerome Alonso
- Manager: Maxime Pala
- Competition: Elite Two Championship

Uniforms
Home colours	Away colours

RC Carpentras XIII are a semi-professional rugby league club based in the city of Carpentras, Vaucluse in the south of France. Formed in 1938, they play in the Elite Two Championship in France, which is the 2nd tier. Their home ground is the Stade de la Roseraire.

== History ==
The club was founded in 1938 under their original name Racing Club de Carpentras XIII du Comtat. The club competed in the amateur rugby league but at the end of just their second season war broke out and brought an end to French sport. Worse was to come when the Vichy Government sanctioned sport to restart but banned rugby league. The club had to change their name to Union Sportive Carpentrassienne and were forced to play rugby union. After the war the club reverted to their original name and gained almost immediate success winning back-to-back amateur titles in 1949 and 1950 in front of regular crowds of between 1,000 and 1,500. The club turned semi-professional in 1951 after their promotion but would have to wait until 1983 to win their next silverware. The National League 1, now called the Elite Two Championship was won when they beat Toulouse Olympique in the final 14-6. In 1992, the club reached the final of the Lord Derby Cup. In season 2000-01 they once again lifted the National League 1 title this time beating RC Albi in the final 20-15 and in 2004 they made it three 2nd tier titles when they beat UTC 2 14-10. None of these victories brought promotion for one reason or another but the following season 2004-05 promotion was secured despite losing the final to Marseille XIII 10-12. Top flight finishes followed of 10th, 10th, 5th, 6th and then 8th the last of which sent them back down to the Elite Two Championship in 2011.

== Crest ==
The club's logo is a red bull uncannily similar in style to that of the club logo of American basketball team the Chicago Bulls; it has only adopted this logo in more recent times.

== Stadium ==
The Stade Municipal (Carpentras) was the club's first stadium. The first rugby league match played in Carpentras came at this ground when it hosted an exhibition game between RC Roanne XIII and Lyon Villeurbanne in 1938. The Stade Municipal had a 2,000 capacity of which 300 were seated. In 1947 the club moved to a purpose built rugby ground in the town. The Stade de la Roseraie hosted the 1955 Lord Derby Cup final when SO Avignon beat Marseille XIII 18-10 in front of a record crowd for any rugby match in Carpentras of 11,600. The current capacity is set at 5,000. The ground underwent a major refurbishment in 1997.

== Honours ==
- National League 1 (Elite Two) (3): 1982-83, 2000–01, 2003–04
- Federal Division (National Division 2) (2): 1948-49, 1949–50
- Coupe Falcou (1): 1948
