= Le Barcarès XIII =

French rugby league club

Club information
- Full name: Barcarès Treize Laurentin Baroudeur
- Colours: Red, White and Blue
- Founded: 1976; 50 years ago

Current details
- Ground: Stade de la Mer
- Competition: National Division 2

Le Barcarès XIII are a French Rugby league club based in Le Barcares, Pyrénées Orientales in the Languedoc-Roussillon region. The club plays in Pool B of the Languedoc-Roussillon League in the French National Division 2.

== Club honours ==
- Elite 2 / France Group B
  - Winners – 1990, 2006
  - Runners Up – 1989
- French National 2
  - Winners – 1996
  - Runners Up - 2002
- Fédéral Championship
  - Winners – 1987, 1992
- Coupe Falcou
  - Winners - 1999
