= Villegailhenc-Aragon XIII =

French semi-professional rugby league club

Club information
- Full name: Villegailhenc-Aragon XIII

Current details
- Ground: Stade Jerome Rieux
- Captain: Vinnie Anderson
- Competition: Elite Two Championship
- 2025/26: 1st (Winners)

Uniforms
Home colours	Away colours

Villegailhenc-Aragon XIII are a semi-professional rugby league team based in Villegailhenc, Aude in Languedoc-Rousillon in southern France. They currently play in the second tier competition the Elite Two Championship. Their home stadium is the Stade Jerome Rieux.

== History ==
Originally being an amateur club they competed in the French rugby league amateur competition the Federal Championship. In 1987 they reached their first 'Federal Championship' final, now called National Division 2, but lost out to Le Barcares 9-16. In 1993 they once again reached the final but lost again this time to Le Lauquet-Palaja 15-18. By the first decade of the millennium they were still playing in the National Division 2 but that changed when in season 2011/12 they once again reached the final but this time they won beating Le Soler 11-6 and thus clinching promotion. The next two seasons brought success in the Paul Dejean Cup then in season 2014/15 they won through to the National Division 1 play-off final and despite losing to US Ferrals XIII they were promoted to the 2nd tier for the very first time, they struggled at the higher level and finished the season bottom with no wins, but they escaped relegation when the top two tier leagues were increased. They also became top flight club AS Carcassonne's official feeder team.

== Current squad ==
2025-26 Squad;

- Mohand Ait Ouaret
- Loic Banquet
- Maxime Banquet
- Nicolas Bertolas
- Enzo Chaumond
- Gregory Delarose
- Anthony Delgado
- Alex Durou
- Robin Escanuela
- Djamel Remok
- Clement Cartier
- Antonine Gau
- Douglas Gauvin
- Thomas Limongi
- Saia Makisi
- Yann Marchio
- Valentin Marot
- Alexandre Mickalezyk
- Victor Monclus
- Denis Montero
- Quentin Nicol
- Tyrone Pau
- Maxime Peault
- Romain Peault
- Tely Pelo
- Dorian Percheron
- Nicolas Puyal
- Ludovic Renu
- Benjamin Tiquet
- Kevin Tisseyre

== Honours ==
- Elite Two Championship (2): 2017–18, 2025–26
- National Division 2 (1): 2011–12
- Paul Dejean Cup (2): 2013, 2014
- Coupe de France Georges-Aillères / Challenge Georges Aillères (2): 2017–18 2025–26
