= RC Salon XIII =

French semi-professional rugby league club

Club information
- Full name: Rugby Club Salon XIII
- Nickname(s): The Jaguars
- Founded: 1947; 78 years ago
- Website: Official Website

Current details
- Ground(s): Stade Marcel Roustan
- Competition: Elite Two Championship

Uniforms
| Home colours | Away colours |

Rugby Club Salon XIII, nicknamed the Jaguars, are a French Rugby league club based in Salon-de-Provence, Bouches-du-Rhône in the Provence-Alpes-Côte d'Azur region. The club plays in the French Elite Two Championship.

== History ==
Founded in 1947 RC Salon lifted their first silverware in 1959 when they won the National 2 (now called National Division 1) title beating Le Soler in the final 21–10. It would be another 17 years before another trophy was won and once again it was the National 2 league title this time following a 13–2 win against US Entraigues XIII . After promotion to the 2nd tier the club became a permanent if not a successful club in the Elite Two Championship. Until that is the mid nineties when from nowhere the club won back to back titles. In 95/96 they beat Tonneins XIII 30-16 and the following season they beat Saint-Cyprien 34–8. The club is currently back playing in the 3rd tier. In season 2016/17 they finished top of the National Division 1 East league.

== Current squad ==
Squad for 2022-23 Season;

Salon Rugby league squad
| Fullbacks: Benjamin Laguerre; Romain Serre; Wingers: Joris Armand; Fatah Benhamida; Erwan Darlot; Jason Duranthon; Tony Ferraioli; Mathieu Fort; Guillaume Liberge; Nicolas Martinod; Centres: Fakih Madi; Shun Peru; Jahoiyakim Afoa; Halves: Jeremy Bertho; Joaquim Gross; Benjamin Jourdan | Props: Amine Allafedy; Erdem Cagdas; Victor Erigozzi; Guillaume Isoird; Anthony Meynier; Chems Mrenda; Vincent Parra; Hookers: Tom Cotot; Theo Jourdan; Kharim Tikhfist; Back Rowers: Alexandre Barrau; Sabri Bendehina; Seydou Diallo; Baptiste Jourdan; Anthony Reynaud |

== Honours ==
- Elite Two Championship (2): 1995–96, 1996–97
- National 2 (National Division 1) (2): 1958–59, 1975–76
