= US Trentels XIII =

French rugby league club

Club information
- Full name: Union Sportive Trentels XIII

Current details
- Ground(s): Stade de Lustrac
- Chairman: Maurice Belbes
- Competition: National Division 1
- 2018/19: 2nd

Uniforms
Home colours

U.S. Trentels XIII are a French Rugby league club based in Trentels, Lot-et-Garonne in the Aquitaine region. The club plays in the French National Division 1. Their home ground is the Stade de Lustrac.

== History ==
Founded as Union Sportive Trentels XIII the club can count on only a brief spell during the 1980s as a successful period. In season 83/84 they reached and won the Federal Division now called the National Division 2 in the final they beat Paris XIII 15-10 thus earning promotion. Three years later they lifted the National 2 title, nowadays known as the National Division 1, when they beat RC Baho XIII in the final 7-6. In season 2011/12 the club reached the National Division 2 final losing to Le Soler XIII 12-23 but despite losing they were also promoted alongside their victors to the 3rd tier. The club still plays at the 3rd tier National Division 1 level

== Club honours ==
- National Division 1 (National 2) (1): 1986-87
- National Division 2 (Fédéral Division) (1): 1983-84
