= Elite 2 (rugby league) =

French second tier rugby league championship

- Sport: Rugby league
- Founded: 2002
- No. of teams: 10
- Country: France
- Most recent champion: Villegailhenc-Aragon XIII (2025–26)
- Level on pyramid: 2
- Promotion to: Super XIII
- Relegation to: National Division 1
- Domestic cup: Lord Derby Cup
- Website: Official site

Elite 2 (formerly the Elite Two Championship) is the second tier semi-professional rugby league competition in France below Super XIII, but above the National Division 1. The regular season runs from September/October to April. The clubs play each other home and away before entering into a series of play-off matches resulting in a Grand Final. The winners can gain promotion to Super XIII providing they meet a minimum criteria. Occasionally the runners-up could be offered promotion. Promotion to Elite 2 from the National Divisions is also based on similar criteria.

== History ==
The Elite Two Championship was formed in 2002 when the French Rugby League Championship was split into two Elite One and Elite Two.

== Teams for 2026–27 season ==
There are ten teams competing in the 2026–27 season.

Teams participating in Elite 2 in the 2026–27 season
Teams participating in Elite 2 in the 2026–27 season located in Occitania region

| Club | Stadium | Capacity | City/Area |
|---|---|---|---|
| RC Carpentras XIII | Stade de la Roseraie | 5,000 | Carpentras, Vaucluse |
| Ille-sur-Tet XIII | Stade Jean Galia | 2,000 | Ille-sur-Tet, Pyrenees Orientales |
| RC Lescure-Arthes XIII | Stade de Lescure d'Albigeois | 2,000 | Lescure-d'Albigeois, Tarn |
| Palau XIII Broncos | Georges Vaills Stadium | | Palau-del-Vidre, Pyrénées-Orientales |
| Pamiers XIII | Stade Magnagounet | | Pamiers, Ariège |
| Realmont XIII | Stade Claude Andre | | Realmont, Tarn |
| RC Salon XIII | Stade Marcel Roustan | 2,000 | Salon-de-Provence, Bouches-du-Rhône |
| Tonneins XIII | Stade Jean Bernège | | Tonneins, Lot-et-Garonne |
| Toulouges-Baho-Le Soler Falcons | Stade Clairfont | | Toulouges, Pyrénées-Orientales |
| Villegailhenc-Aragon XIII | Stade Municipal Conques sur Orbiel | 2,000 | Villegailhenc, Aude |

== Past winners ==
| Year | Winner | Score | Runner Up | Ref. |
|---|---|---|---|---|
| 2002–03 | Sainte-Livrade XIII | 25 – 15 | UTC 2 | |
| 2003–04 | RC Carpentras XIII | 14 – 10 | UTC 2 | |
| 2004–05 | Marseille XIII | 12 – 10 | RC Carpentras XIII | |
| 2005–06 | Le Barcarès XIII | 25 – 19 | Palau XIII Broncos | |
| 2006–07 | Gifi Bias XIII | 16 – 14 | Racing Club Albi XIII | |
| 2007–08 | Le Barcarès XIII | 30 – 16 | Montpellier Red Devils | |
| 2008–09 | AS Corbeil | 30 – 14 | RC Baho XIII | |
| 2009–10 | Palau XIII Broncos | 18 – 12 | Montpellier Red Devils | |
| 2010–11 | RC Lescure-Arthes XIII | 12 – 0 | RC Baho XIII | |
| 2011–12 | Palau XIII Broncos | 34 – 17 | Toulouse Jules-Julien XIII | |
| 2012–13 | Palau XIII Broncos | 26 – 22 | RC Baho XIII | |
| 2013–14 | RC Baho XIII | 18 – 12 | Racing Club Albi XIII | |
| 2014–15 | Racing Club Albi XIII | 21 – 14 | RC Lescure-Arthes XIII | |
| 2015–16 | La Reole XIII | 20 – 16 | RC Lescure-Arthes XIII | |
| 2016–17 | Villefranche XIII Aveyron | 13 – 10 | RC Baho XIII | |
| 2017–18 | Villegailhenc-Aragon XIII | 23 – 16 | RC Lescure-Arthes XIII | |
| 2018–19 | RC Baho XIII | 35 – 20 | Villegailhenc-Aragon XIII | |
| 2019–20 | Cancelled due to the COVID-19 pandemic. | | | |
| 2020–21 | Cancelled due to the COVID-19 pandemic. | | | |
| 2021–22 | Baroudeurs de Pia XIII | 15 – 14 | RC Baho XIII | |
| 2022–23 | Ille-sur-Têt XIII | 25 – 18 | Villefranche XIII Aveyron | |
| 2023–24 | Villefranche XIII Aveyron | 37 – 14 | Villegailhenc-Aragon XIII | |
| 2024–25 | Palau XIII Broncos | 20 – 17 | Villegailhenc-Aragon XIII | |
| 2025–26 | Villegailhenc-Aragon XIII | 30 – 18 | Palau XIII Broncos | |

== See also ==
- French rugby league system
- Rugby league in France
- Lord Derby Cup
- Coupe Falcou
