= Baroudeurs de Pia XIII =

French semi-professional rugby league club

Club information
- Full name: Baroudeurs de Pia XIII
- Nickname: Burros (donkeys)
- Founded: 1960; 66 years ago

Current details
- Ground: Stade Daniel-Ambert (4,500)
- Coach: Benoît Albert
- Captain: Théo Fages
- Competition: Super XIII
- 2025–26: 2nd (Champions)

Uniforms
Home colours

Baroudeurs de Pia XIII are a French Rugby league team based in Pia, Pyrénées-Orientales in the Languedoc-Roussillon region. SM Pia XIII was founded in 1960 and were national champions four times before they dropped out of the Elite 1 division after the 2012–13 season. Baroudeurs de Pia, who were formed in 1999, were a reserve team of SM Pia playing in the lower divisions and went dormant shortly after SM Pia had done so. When they were revived two years later they became the principal club in Pia. They play in the Super XIII the top level of rugby league in France. Home games are played at the Stade Daniel-Ambert.

== History ==
=== Salanque Méditérranée Pia rugby XIII ===
SM Pia XIII was established in 1960, winning the Lord Derby Cup in 1975 and the French Rugby League Championship in the 1994–95 season. The most successful period for SM Pia came in the 2000s when in the Elite 1 Championship and Lord Derby Cup they won consecutive league and cup doubles in the 2005–06 and 2006–07 seasons The club won a third Elite 1 championship in the 2012–13 season before withdrawing from the league.

=== XIII Baroudeurs de Pia ===
Baroudeurs de Pia were formed in 1999 and were the reserve side of Pia. In the 2003–04 season they reached their first league final in the National Division 1 but lost against Vedene XIII 6-42. The next two seasons they lost two more finals firstly against Salses XIII 20-36 and then to Villeneuve Tolosane 14–30. However, the 2005–06 season did bring some success when they won the Coupe Falcou to win their first trophy. 2006–07 brought relegation but the following season they registered a league and cup double. They beat RC Lescure-Arthes XIII 'A' in the league 30-6 and also lifted the Coupe Falcou for a second time.

=== Revival ===
Following a period of dormancy for the clubs in Pia, Baroudeurs de Pia restarted in the lower leagues and were promoted several times over the following seasons. They reached the National Division 2 final in the 2016-2017 season and moved up to the National Division 1 in the 2017–18 season. In 2018, Pia won the Coupe de France Paul-Dejean by defeating US Trentels XIII 26–22 in the final. In the 2018–19 season Pia returned to the Elite 2. In the 2021–22 season, Pia defeated RC Baho XIII 15–14 with a golden point in the Elite 2 final and moved up to the Elite 1 Championship.

In the 2025–26 season, Pian defeated Carcassonne 31–30 in golden point extra time to win the Super XIII final.

== Current squad ==
Squad for the 2026-2027 Super XIII season.

- (France) Kylian Benavent (Wing)
- (France) Hamish Bentley (Lock)
- (France) Ilias Bergal (Wing)
- (France) Loan Castano (Prop)
- (France) Lenny Chachoua (Five-eighth)
- (France) Mathis Dumont (Five-eighth)
- (France) Theo Fages (Five-eighth)
- (France) Jordan Flovie (Wing)
- (France) Alexandre Huescar (Hooker)
- (France) Damien Huescar (Fullback)
- (France) Leo Llong (Second-row)
- (France) Maxime Masaute (Centre)
- (Italy) Ethan Natoli (Second-row)
- (France) David Pena (Centre)
- (France) Marc Pena (Prop)
- (France) Eloi Pelissier (Hooker)
- (France) Justin Sangaré (Prop)
- (Samoa) Fua Schwalger (Centre)
- (France) Alexis Scimone (Lock)
- (France) Bastien Scimone (Lock)
- (Tokelau) Ilai Tuia (Prop)
- (Tokelau) Nonu Tuia (Prop)
- (France) Florian Vailhen (Prop)

== Honours ==
SM Pia

- French Championship / Elite 1 / Super XIII (5): 1994–95, 2005–06, 2006–07, 2012–13, 2025–26
- Lord Derby Cup (3): 1975, 2006, 2007

Baroudeurs de Pia

- National Division 2 (1): 2016–17
- Paul Dejean Cup (1): 2018
- Albert Falcou Cup (2): 2006, 2007
