= Saint-Estève XIII Catalan =

French semi-professional rugby league club

Club information
- Nickname: Les Baby Dracs
- Founded: 2006; 20 years ago
- Website: http://www.catalansdragons.com/equipe-elite/

Current details
- Ground: Stade Municipal (6,000)
- Chairman: Rémi Delherbe, Geoffrey Reiser
- Coach: Liam Duffy
- Captain: Valentin Fernandez
- Competition: Super XIII
- 2025–26: 6th

Uniforms
Home colours

Saint-Estève XIII Catalan are a semi-professional rugby league team based in Perpignan in the region of Pyrénées-Orientales in the south of France.

Founded in 2006 following the transfer of Catalans Dragons from the French to British rugby league system, the club plays in the Super XIII (the top tier rugby league competition in France), and effectively replaced Catalans Dragons in the French league, and thus is, in effect, Catalans Dragons reserves.

The club takes its name from AS Saint-Estève and XIII Catalan, the two clubs that merged to form Catalans Dragons. They have won the league title once and the cup four times. Their current home stadium is the Stade Municipal and they are coached by Liam Duffy.

== History ==
=== Background ===
In 2000 Bernard Guasch managed to bring together two highly successful Perpignan rugby league clubs in AS Saint Estève and XIII Catalan to form one club which he named Union Treiziste Catalane. The ultimate aim was to join the British Super League. After just one season the club won the Lord Derby Cup beating Limoux Grizzlies 38–17. Saint-Cyprien XIII of the Elite Two Championship and also based in Perpignan joined the merger in 2002. After another cup win in 2003, in season 2004–05 they completed a league and cup double and it was at this time that the club presented a business plan to join the Super League. In 2006 they were admitted into the Super League under a new name Catalans Dragons.

=== Formation ===
Saint-Estève XIII Catalan was formed following the Dragons' transfer to the Super League, and began competing in the Elite One Championship, bringing back the names of the original clubs pre-2000. The club acts as a feeder team for Catalans Dragons while also providing a Perpignan presence in the French league. In 2016 the club lifted the cup again.

== Colours and Badge ==
The team's playing colours are white, red, blue and yellow which are the colours of Catalans Dragons, incorporating the colours of the original clubs from the merger. They also share very similar badges the difference being the team name

== Stadium ==
When the merged team began, they played at the Stade Gilbert Brutus and stayed here until 2015 when they switched to the ground formerly used by AS Saint-Estève in the district of the same name on the outskirts of Perpignan. The ground has floodlights and a main stand that has 2,000 seats.

== Current squad ==
Squad for 2026-27 Season

Saint-Estève XIII Catalan Squad
(France) Alan Baby; (France) Sophien Bitigri; (France) Théo Bonneriez; (France) Paul Carrion; (France) Elio Cazanave; (France) Giordano Descalzi; (France) Samy Devoyon; (France) Yann Doutres; (France) Valentín Fernandez (captain); (France) Mathis Frayssinous; (France) Nathan Gandou; (France) Félix Gautier; (France) Liam Giacobbi; (France) Romain Humbert; (France) Matéo Jimenez-Lopez	(France) Maxime Jobe; (France) Matthis Kehres; (France) Lorik Lejeune; (France) Joris Martignoles; (France) Sylvain Masuaute; (France) Salim Nahal; (France) Lucas Neveu; (France) Tom Poncelot; (France) Timéo Portier; (France) Baptise Pourchi; (France) Léo Ricard; (Tonga) Chris Satae; (France) Lucas Tignol; (France) Clément Troni

== Honours ==
- Elite One Championship

Winners (1): 2018–19
Runners-up (1): 2012–13

- Lord Derby Cup

Winners (3): 2015–16, 2017–18, 2024–2025
Runners-up (2): 2014–15, 2018–19
