= RC Lescure-Arthes XIII =

French semi-professional rugby league club

RC Lescure-Arthès XIII

Club information
- Full name: Racing Club Lescure-Arthès XIII
- Nickname: The Minotaurs
- Founded: 1964; 62 years ago
- Website: Website

Current details
- Ground: Stade Jean Vidal
- Chairman: Benoit Tollot, Pascal Assie
- Coach: Fabien Denis
- Competition: Elite Two Championship
- 2017/18: 2nd

Uniforms
Home colours	Away colours

Racing Club Lescure-Arthès XIII are a French Rugby league club based in Lescure-d'Albigeois, Tarn in the Midi-Pyrénées region. The club plays in the French Elite Two Championship. Founded in 1964 as a youth side, their home ground is the Stade Jean Vidal.

== History ==
Racing Club Lescure XIII as they were originally called were founded in 1964 by school teacher Jean Carayon as a youth team. Helped by fellow teachers Pierre Lapeyre and Henri Papailhau the team used to train and play anywhere they could until the Stade Jean Vidal was secured and became their base. In 1974 it was decided to start a senior team but with their ground not up to league standard they played their first season at the Stade Mazicou in nearby Albi. During the debut season work on their own ground got under way, the old wooden stand was replaced along with new changing rooms, floodlights installed and a new clubhouse built, so that the following season the first team could play at the Stade Jean Vidal. In 1983 the club reached their first final but lost the Federal Championship to Le Soler 0-47. Apart from two cup wins in the amateur Coupe Falcou in 1986 and 1991 all the National 2 finals they reached they lost. In 1988 it was Cahors XIII who beat them 17-6 and for three consecutive seasons during the mid 90s there were defeats against Toulouse Jules-Julien 8–12 in 1994, Gifi Bias XIII 12–34 in 1995 and Le Barcares XIII 15–20 in 1996. It was during this era though that the youth team completed a league and cup double in 1980 and in 1988 the club broadened its horizons by changing its name to include the nearby town of Arthes thus becoming RC Lescure-Arthes XIII. In 2002 a ladies and girls teams were started and the senior men's team due to the expansion and reorganisation of the French leagues found themselves by 2010 in the 2nd tier Elite Two Championship and by the end of season 2010-11 they'd won promotion to the top flight by beating RC Baho XIII 12–0 in the final. Their stay in the Elite One Championship lasted two seasons in which they finished bottom in both. The bridesmaid tag returned on their return to the 2nd tier, runner-up in 2015 to Albi RL XIII 14-21 and in 2016 to La Reole XIII 16–20. Below the first team the 'u15' were crowned champions of France and the women's team reached the league semi-finals to record their best ever season.

== Stadium ==
The Stade Jean Vidal previously called the Stade de Lescure d'Albigeios has been the club's regular home ground, apart from their debut season when they played at the Stade Mazicou in Albi. A multi-use complex which hosts rugby league, football and athletics. Jean Vidal was a local miner and trade union rep born in nearby Albi.

== Current squad ==
Squad for 2021–22 season;

- Marc Alarcon - Wing
- Fabien Bernard - Hooker
- Louis Bonnafont - Wing
- Alexandre Boullier - Centre
- Emmanuel Canac - Prop
- Julien Cance - Fullback
- Thibault Cousinie - Hooker
- Thomas Fabre - Five-eighth
- Damien Fedou - Centre
- Kyle Flies - Wing
- Flavien Fontrouge - Prop
- Julien Galibert - Prop
- Romain Gandouin - Prop
- Enzo Gauci - Lock
- Jerome Huchede - Prop
- Philippe Heral - Second-row
- Damien Jacquet - Lock
- Clement Juarez - Prop
- Benoit Loubiere - Hooker
- Kevin Martinez - Five-eighth
- Maxime Mongeot - Wing
- Romain Neuville - Centre
- Nicolas Pomie - Second-row
- Killian Portal - Prop
- Loic Pepin - Prop
- Anthony Ricard - Prop
- Pierre-Jean Ricard - Centre
- Benoit Rigal - Lock
- Clement Salacroup - Prop
- Martyn Smith - Hooker
- Remy Tuzik - Second-row
- Damien Vernier - Prop
- Romain Vigroux - Five-eighth

== Honours ==
- Elite Two (1): 2010–11
- Elite Two runners-up (3): 2014–15, 2015–16, 2017–18
- Coupe Falcou (2): 1986, 1991
- French 9's Champions (1) 2015-16
