= Palau XIII Broncos =

French professional rugby league club

Palau XIII

Club information
- Full name: Palau XIII Broncos
- Nickname: Broncos of Palau
- Founded: 1920; 106 years ago

Current details
- Ground: Stade Georges Vaills
- Coach: Benoit Albert
- Manager: Antoine Noguera
- Competition: Elite 2
- 2025/26: 2nd (Runners-up)

Uniforms
Home colours

Palau XIII Broncos also known as Palau XIII or Palau Broncos are a professional rugby league team based in Palau-del-Vidre in the Occitanie region in the south of France. They currently play in the Elite 2 championship which is the second level in France. The club was founded in 1920. They play their matches at the Stade Georges Vaills.

== History ==
In 1920 Racing Club Palauenc was formed as a rugby club. They were a feeder team for USA Perpignan. Their first silverware arrived in 1928 when they were crowned champion of France's 3rd series. The club switched to Rugby League in 1952 where they competed in the amateur 3rd Division. In 1956 they won the 3rd Division title – their first as a Rugby League club.

In 2008 the club completed a league and cup double winning the Paul Dejean Cup and the National Division 1 league, after this success the club decided to move up to the semi professional ranks of the Elite Two Championship. After five seasons at this level in which they won the competition three times the club decided to move up to the top tier in 2013, promotion being optional.

In July 2021, the club withdrew from the Elite 1 championship and moved down to the National Division. In the 2022–23 season Palau defeated Realmont XIII 46–12 to win the final of the Paul Dejean Cup and then won 23–20 against US Ferrals XIII in the National Division final and were promoted to Elite 2.

The club runs youth teams and reserve teams through which the club have produced many top class players including former internationals Jacques Jorda, Julien Touxagas and David Berthezene.

== Colours and badge ==
Palau XIII Broncos play in red and yellow in various designs, the Broncos moniker was added following their successful promotion in 2008

== Stadium ==
Stade Georges Vaills has been the only stadium ever used by the club. The ground is named after a former player of theirs who was born in the area. The ground is situated next to the River Tech and has one main stand. When visiting British clubs are in France to play the Catalans Dragons they frequently use the ground to train on. The ground has hosted two youth Internationals between France and England, on 11 November 2009 France won 22-14 and on 3 June 2011 England won 28-19

== Honours ==
- Elite Two (4): 1993–94, 2009–10, 2011–12, 2012–13
- National Division 1 (1): 2007–8
- 2nd Division (3): 1958–59, 1984–85, 1999–2000
- 3rd Division (3): 1955–56, 1987–88, 1989–90
- Division Federal (1): 1964–65
- Federal Cup Winners (2): 1984, 2001
- Paul Dejean Cup Winners (2): 2008, 2023
