= List of France national rugby league team players =

This article contains a list in alphabetical order of rugby league players who have played for France in full international matches since the team's first match in 1934.

As of 10 July 2022

== A ==
- Fourcade Abasse
- Patrick Accroué
- Darren Adams
- Bastien Ader
- Georges Aillères
- Pierre Aillères
- Guy Alard
- Lucas Albert
- Gilbert Alberti
- Adolphe Alésina
- Adolphe Alésina Sr.
- Vincent Almuzara
- Richard Alonso
- Yves Alvernhe
- David Amat
- Auguste Ambert
- Marc Ambert
- Theo Anast
- Guy Andrieu
- Clement Andrinople
- Michel Anglade
- Éric Anselme
- Antranick Apelian
- Jean-Marie Armand
- Olivier Arnaud
- René Arne
- Ezzedine Attia
- Jean Aubert
- Puig Aubert
- Jose Audignon
- Jean Audoubert
- André Audy
- Christophe Auroy
- Célestin Ayme
- Pierre Azalbert
- Sébastien Azéma

== B ==
- Abdrajah Baba
- Patrick Baco
- Christian Baile
- Jean-Philippe Baile
- Jason Baitieri
- Marc Balleroy
- Bertrand Ballouhey
- Dominique Baloup
- Vincent Banet
- Frédéric Banquet
- Emmanuel Bansept
- Antonin Barbazanges
- Antoine Barbes
- Aimé Barcelli
- Michel Barde
- Aimé Bardes
- René Barnoud
- Jean Barreteau
- Lucien Barris
- William Barthau
- Jean Barthe
- Paul Bartoletti
- Cyril Baudouin
- Yves Bégou
- Gerard Bélivaud
- Maurice Bellan
- Lambert Belmas
- Romaric Bemba
- Gilbert Benausse
- Patrice Benausse
- René Benausse
- Andrew Bentley
- Kane Bentley
- Fabien Beranger
- Andre Béraud
- Ilias Bergal
- Denis Bergé
- Thierry Bernabé
- Didier Bernard
- Rene Bernard
- Gaston Berteloitte
- David Berthezène
- Gabriel Berthomieu
- Sylvain Bès
- Marcel Bescos
- Jean-Louis Bézard
- Alexandre Biblocque
- Denis Bienès
- Roger Biffi
- Joris Bissière
- Jerôme Bisson
- Antoine Blain
- Georges Blanc
- Marcel Blanc
- Vea Bloomfield
- Angelo Boldini
- Pascal Bomati
- Jean Bombail
- Élie Bonal
- Jean-Marie Bonal
- Raoul Bonamy
- Floréal Bonet
- Hervé Bonet
- Christophe Bonnafous
- Louis Bonnery
- Ėric Bonnet
- Georges Bonnet
- Guillaume Bonnet
- Marcel Bonnet
- Jean-Christophe Borlin
- Gérard Borreil
- Jean-Marie Bosc
- Thomas Bosc
- Émile Bosch
- Hadj Boudebza
- John Boudebza
- Michel Boule
- Mark Bourneville
- Gérard Bourreil
- Benoît Bourrel
- Frederic Bourrel
- Pierre-Louis Bourrel
- Jean-Marc Bourret
- Julian Bousquet
- Alain Bouzer
- Charles Bouzinac
- Gérard Boyals
- Clément Boyer
- Louis Brané
- Serge Bret
- Jean-Louis Brial
- Marcel Brinsolles
- Régis Brioux
- Élie Brousse
- Lambert Brunet
- Maurice Brunetaud
- André Bruzy
- Guy Bruzy
- Thierry Buttignol

== C ==
- Jacques Cabero
- Didier Cabestany
- Robert Caillou
- Germain Calbète
- Christophe Calegari
- Gaston Calixte
- José Calle
- Christian Calvo
- Laurent Cambres
- Daniel Camiade
- Patrice Campana
- Bastien Canet
- Vincent Cantoni
- Jean Capdouze
- Manuel Caravaca
- Damien Cardace
- Guy Cardonna
- Laurent Carrasco
- Christian Carre
- André Carrère
- Irenée Carrère
- Joseph Carrère
- Patrick Carrias
- Bernard Cartier
- Andre Casas
- Jean Cassagneau
- Robert Casse
- Jean-Emmanuel Cassin
- Michel Cassin
- Delphin Castanon
- Bruno Castany
- Éric Castel
- Henri Castel
- Jean-Louis Castel
- Rémi Casty
- Paul Caujolle
- Georges Caussarieu
- Guy Cénet
- Arnaud Cervello
- Bernard Cesse
- Robert Chabannes
- Yves Chabert
- Henri Chamorin
- Pierre Chamorin
- Max Chantal
- Olivier Charles
- Florian Chaubet
- Eugène Chaud
- Florian Chautard
- Patrick Chauvet
- Philippe Chiron
- Dane Chisholm
- Yves Civil
- Christian Clar
- Jean-Pierre Clar
- Richard Clarke
- Roger Claudel
- Sylvain Claverie
- Trent Clayton
- André Clerc
- Philippe Clergeau
- Brian Coles
- David Collado
- Aurélien Cologni
- Jean-Jacques Cologni
- Jean Colombies
- Camille Combeau
- Gaston Combes
- Jean-Luc Combettes
- Gaston Comes
- Honoré Conti
- Raymond Contrastin
- Gilles Cornut
- Serge Costals
- Étienne Cougnenc
- Bouatou Coulibaly
- Étienne Courtine
- Regis Courty
- Michael Cousseau
- Didier Couston
- Alexandre Couttet
- Damien Couturier
- Gerard Cremoux
- Joseph Crespo
- Marcel Criotier
- Jean-Claude Cros
- Rhys Curran
- Bernard Curt
- André Cussac

== D ==
- Alrix Da Costa
- Marcel Daffis
- Henri Daniel
- Jean Darricau
- Jean Dauger
- Serge Dauphin
- Gérard Dautant
- Justin Davant
- Lucien de Macedo
- Maurice de Matos
- Francis de Nadaï
- Aurelien Decarnin
- Jean Dedieu
- Paul Dejean
- Yacine Dekkiche
- Guy Delaunay
- Guy Delaye
- Henri Delhommeau
- Henri Delhoste
- Guy Delpech
- André Delpoux
- Joseph Denarnaud
- Joseph Desclaux
- David Despin
- Raymond Detchart
- Fabien Devecchi
- Jordan Dezaria
- Daniel Divet
- Nabil Djalout
- Elysée Domercq
- Jean Dop
- Alain Doulieu
- Pierre Dubié
- Jacques Dubon
- André Ducasse
- René Duffort
- Jean Duhau
- Arnaud Dulac
- André Dumas
- Gilles Dumas
- Christian Duplé
- Vincent Duport
- Henri Durand
- Luc Durand
- Édouard Dusseigneur
- Francis Duthil

== E ==
- Pascal Eito
- Abderazak El Khalouki
- Olivier Elima
- Patrick Entat
- Robert Eramouspe
- Alexis Escamilla
- Bastien Escamilla
- Morgan Escaré
- Pierre Escourrou
- Franck Esponda
- Dominique Espugna
- Fabrice Estebanez
- Serge Estiau
- Cyprien Estoueight
- Roger Estrada
- Pierre Etchart
- Jean Etcheberry

== F ==
- Bernard Fabre
- Jacques Fabre
- André Fabry
- Georges Fages
- Pascal Fages
- Théo Fages
- Jamal Fakir
- Laurent Faletti
- Marc Faumuina
- Daniel Fédou
- Adel Fellous
- Andre Ferren
- René Ferrero
- David Ferriol
- Philippe Fourcade
- Philippe Fourquet
- Jean Foussat
- David Fraisse
- Jacques Franc
- Roger Frassi
- Marius Frattini
- Éric Frayssinet
- Laurent Frayssinous
- Charles Frison
- Jean Frison
- Léopold Fabre

== G ==
- Marcel Gacia
- Romain Gagliazzo
- Charles Galaup
- Jean Galia
- Benjamin Garcia
- Guy Garcia
- Jean-Marc Garcia
- Roger Gardon
- Roger Garnung
- Roger Garrigue
- Jacques Garzino
- Andre Gau
- Cédric Gay
- Bernard Gaye
- Jacques Gayral
- Gabriel Genoud
- Julien Gerin
- Pierre Germineau
- Philippe Gestas
- Henri Gibert
- Tony Gigot
- Jose Giné
- Jean-Charles Giorgi
- Laurent Girardet
- Gilles Gironella
- Serge Gleyzes
- Antoine Gonzalès
- Jean-Marc Gonzalès
- Michel Gonzalès
- Pierre Gonzalès
- Roland Gorse
- Cyrille Gossard
- Mickaël Goudemand
- Yvon Gourbal
- Jean Graciet
- Christophe Grandjean
- Georges Grandjean
- Jean-François Grechi
- Clint Greenshields
- Ivan Grésèque
- Maxime Grésèque
- Joseph Griffard
- Mathieu Griffi
- Jacques Gruppi
- Raymond Gruppi
- Bruno Guasch
- Jacques Guigue
- Renaud Guigue
- Bernard Guilhem
- Roger Guilhem
- Marius Guiral
- Germaine Guiraud
- Hervé Guiraud
- Joseph Guiraud
- Jérôme Guisset

== H ==
- Jean Hatchondo
- Lilian Hebert
- Rachid Hechiche
- Didier Hermet
- Jérôme Hermet
- Maxime Hérold
- Sylvain Houles
- Guy Husson

== I ==
- Bernard Imbert
- Jacques Imbert
- Jean-Marie Imbert
- Adam Innes

== J ==
- Karl Jaavuo
- Jean Jammes
- Pascal Jampy
- Olivier Janzac
- Bernard Jean
- René Jean
- Henri Jensous
- Antoine Jimenez
- Robert Joanblancq
- Robert Joly
- Mathieu Julia
- Benjamin Jullien
- Mathieu Jussaume

== K ==
- Jean Kaczmareck
- Albert Kaempf
- Étienne Kaminski
- Fernand Kaminski
- Younes Khattabi
- Mathieu Khedimi
- Mark Kheirallah
- Joseph Krawzyck
- Mourad Kriouache

== L ==
- Philippe Labache
- Roger Lacans
- Andre Lacaze
- Pierre Lacaze
- Jean-Pierre Lacoste
- Michel Laffargue
- Francis Laforgue
- Guy Laforgue
- Mathieu Laguerre
- Charles Lamarque
- Laurent Lambert
- Roger Lanta
- Joseph Lapoterie
- Pascal Laroche
- Kevin Larroyer
- Hervé Larrue
- Christian Laskawiec
- Gabriel Laskawiec
- Christian Lassale
- Christian Laumond
- Pierre Laurent
- Georges Lavielle
- Guy Lavigne
- Michel Laville
- Corentin Le Cam
- Jean-Pierre Lecompte
- Jean-Rene Ledru
- Odé Lepes
- Francis Lévy
- Patrick Limongi
- Roger Llanas
- Roger Llari
- Bernard Llong
- Francis Lope
- Michael Lopez
- Serge Loubet
- Moussa Loukili
- Laurent Lucchese
- Guy Lucia

== M ==
- Christian Macalli
- Jean-Pierre Magagnin
- Jean-Pierre Magnac
- Michel Maique
- Roger Majoral
- Robert Majorel
- Andre Malacamp
- Yannick Mantese
- Claude Mantoulan
- Paul Marcon
- Thibaut Margalet
- Patrick Marginet
- Rémy Marginet
- Gavin Marguerite
- Antoni Maria
- Anthony Marion
- Henri Marracq
- Herv Marrot
- Serge Marsolan
- Frantz Martial
- Martin Martin
- Christophe Martinez
- Sébastien Martins
- Denis Martiquet
- Andre Marty
- Jean-Claude Marty
- Francis Mas
- Joseph Maso
- Samy Masselot
- Thierry Mater
- Charles Mathon
- Thierry Matteo
- Tony Maurel
- Alain Maury
- Jean-Claude Mayorgas
- Hervé Mazard
- Michel Mazaré
- Louis Mazon
- Robert Médus
- Luc Mendes
- Jacques Merquey
- Jean-Louis Meurin
- Yves Mézard
- Louis Michel
- Stéphane Millet
- Hakim Miloudi
- Jacques Moliner
- Michel Molinier
- Christophe Moly
- Pascal Mons
- Antione Montcel
- Pierre Montgaillard
- François Montrucolis
- Robert Moulinas
- René Moulis
- Henri Mounes
- Grégory Mounis
- Arthur Mourgue
- Michel Moussard
- José Moya
- Nicolas Munoz
- Mikaël Murcia
- Justin Murphy

== N ==
- Michel Naudo
- Patrick Nauroy
- Quentin Nauroy
- Romain Navarrete
- Jean Nédorezoff
- Ulysse Negrier
- Patrick Noguera
- François Noguères
- François Nouel
- Marcel Nourrit

== O ==
- Roger Ourliac

== P ==
- Jacques Pacull
- Mathias Pala
- Marc Palanques
- Roger Palisses
- Serge Pallares
- Jean Pambrun
- Jean Pano
- Augustin Parent
- Regis Pastre-Courtine
- Jacques Pech
- Éloi Pélissier
- Daniel Pellerin
- Dimitri Pelo
- Alain Perducat
- Marcel Pere
- Andre Perez
- Raoul Perez
- Serge Perez
- Ugo Perez
- Charles Petit
- Serge Pialat
- Francis Pierre
- Marcel Pillon
- Nicolas Piquemal
- Mikhail Piskunov
- Sébastien Planas
- Bernard Plante
- Jean Plante
- Pierre Plo
- Jean Poch
- Louis Poletti
- Cyril Pons
- Edouard Ponsinet
- Maurice Porra
- Jean-Philippe Pougeau
- Romain Pourret
- Jacques Poux
- Olivier Pramil
- Maxime Puech
- Robert Aubert Puig

== Q ==
- Aldo Quaglio
- Jean-Louis Quintilla

== R ==
- Jean-Luc Rabot
- Sébastien Raguin
- Hugues Ratier
- Yves Raynaud
- Raymond Rebujent
- François Recaborde
- Eric Remirez
- Roger Rey
- Nicolas Reyre
- Francis Ribere
- Guy Ribot
- Francois Rinaldi
- Julien Rinaldi
- Henri Riu
- Andre Rives
- Patrick Rives
- Stanislas Robin
- Patrick Rocci
- Guy Rodriguez
- Sebastian Rodriguez
- Laurent Roldos
- Arthur Romano
- Franck Romano
- Joel Roosebrouck
- Michel Roses
- Francis Rossi
- Florent Rouanet
- Gilbert Rouanet
- Mickaël Rouch
- César Rougé
- Jean Rouqueirol
- Jacques Rouscayrol
- Max Rousié
- Andre Rousse
- Franck Rovira
- Andre Ruiz
- Jean Ruiz

== S ==
- Christian Sabatie
- Pierre Sabatié
- Pierre Saboureau
- Teddy Sadaoui
- Jean Salat
- Robert Samatan
- Frederick Sana
- Jason Sands
- Justin Sangaré
- Henri Sanz
- Raphael Sarris
- Jean-Bernard Saumitou
- Jean-Pierre Sauret
- Armand Save
- Andre Savonne
- Gerard Savonne
- Christian Scicchitano
- Paul Séguier
- Rene Segura
- Victor Serrano
- Frederic Serret
- Artie Shead
- Jordan Sigismeau
- Mickaël Simon
- Jean-Pierre Sire
- Claude Sirvent
- Philippe Sokolow
- Patrick Solal
- Jean-Luc Solier
- Henri Sorondo
- Romain Sort
- Clément Soubeyras
- Gadwin Springer
- Cyril Stacul
- Yves Storer
- Pierre Surre

== T ==
- Pierre Taillantou
- Gael Tallec
- Amar Tamghart
- Ernest Tarozzi
- Jared Taylor
- Claude Teisseire
- Frédéric Teixido
- Stephane Tena
- Sébastien Terrado
- Rene Terrats
- Charles Thenegal
- Max Theron
- Marc Tisseyre
- Yoan Tisseyre
- Serge Titeux
- Serge Tonus
- Patrick Torreilles
- Alain Touchagues
- Raymond Toujas
- Julien Touxagas
- Francis Tranier
- Yves Treilhes
- Jean-Pierre Tremouille
- Fredo Trescazes
- Patrick Trinque

== U ==
- Ambroise Ulma

== V ==
- Frédéric Vaccari
- Andre Vadon
- Thierry Valero
- Eric van Brussell
- Michael van Snick
- Henri Vaslin
- Daniel Verdes
- Gilbert Verdie
- Dominique Verdieres
- Louis Verge
- Bruno Verges
- Jean Verges
- Eric Vergniol
- Guy Vigouroux
- Jean-Jacques Vila
- Constant Villegas
- Jean Villeneuve
- Yves Viloni
- Jean-Marc Vincent
- Jerome Vincent
- Robert Viscay
- Marcel Volot
- Maurice Voron

== W ==
- Eric Waligunda
- John Wiagafa
- John Wilson
- Aaron Wood
- Patrick Wosniack
- Vincent Wulf
- James Wynne

== Y ==
- Bagdad Yaha
- Fouad Yaha
- Valentin Yesa

== Z ==
- Charles Zalduendo
- Frédéric Zitter
