= 1981 European Rugby League Championship =

European rugby league championship

1981 European Championship
- Number of teams: 3
- Winner: France (6th title)
- Matches played: 3
- Top scorer: José Moya (10)
- Top try scorer: Joël Roosebrouck (2)

The 1981 European Rugby League Championship was the 22nd edition of the Rugby League European Championship, a rugby league tournament that took place in Europe. The tournament saw the same three teams that competed in the previous edition in 1980.

The format was a single round-robin format, with the matches being played between January and March 1981. After the three matches were played, France took out their 11th title by defeating the other two opponents in England and Wales.

== Venues ==
(England) Hull	(France) Narbonne	(England) Leeds
Boothferry Park, Hull	Stade de l'Egassiarial, Narbonne	Headingley
Capacity: 15,160	Capacity: 12,000	Capacity: 30,000

== Squads ==
=== France ===
- Marc Ambert (Pia)
- Manuel Caravaca (Carcassonne)
- Delphin Castanon (Lézignan)
- Max Chantal (Villeneuve-sur-Lot)
- Philippe Fourquet (Villeneuve-sur-Lot)
- José Giné (Roanne)
- Ivan Grésèque (XIII Catalan)
- Hervé Guiraud (Lézignan)
- Christian Maccali (Villeneuve-sur-Lot)
- José Moya (Carcassonne)
- Michel Naudo (Pia)
- Marcel Pillon (Saint-Estève)
- Hugues Ratier (Lézignan)
- Joël Roosebrouck (Villeneuve-sur-Lot) (Captain)
- Sébastien Rodriguez (Pia)
- Jean-Pierre Trémouille (Tonneins)
- Éric Waligunda (Lézignan)

=== England ===
- Mick Adams
- Brian Case
- Len Casey
- Des Drummond
- George Fairbairn (Captain)
- Steve Fenton
- Roy Holdstock
- John Joyner
- Ken Kelly
- Steve Nash
- Steve Norton
- Steve O'Neill
- Bill Pattinson
- Harry Pinner
- Terry Richardson
- Mike Smith
- Ian Potter
- Arnold Walker
- David Ward
- John Woods

=== Wales ===
- John Bevan (Captain)
- Harold Box
- Adrian Cambriani
- Steve Diamond
- Colin Dixon
- Clive Griffiths
- Martin Herdman
- Mel James
- Brian Juliff
- Roy Mathias
- Gareth Owen
- Roger Owen
- Donald Parry
- Paul Prendiville
- Steve Rule
- Trevor Skerrett
- Graham Walters
- Danny Wilson
- Paul Woods

== Results ==
31 January

France	23 – 5	Wales
Tries: Joël Roosebrouck (2); Philippe Fourquet; Ivan Grésèque; Jean-Philippe Trémouille; Goals: José Moya (4); Field Goals:		Tries: Donald Parry Goals: Danny Wilson (2)

Stade de l'Egassiarial, Narbonne
Attendance: 4,120

21 February

England	1 – 5	France
Tries: Goals: Field Goals: George Fairbairn		Tries: Hervé Guiraud; Goals: José Moya (1)

Headingley, Leeds
Attendance: 3,229

18 March

England	17 – 4	Wales
Tries: John Joyner; Ken Kelly; John Woods; Goals: George Fairbairn (4); Field Goals:		Tries: Goals: Steve Rule (2)

Boothferry Park, Hull
Attendance: 4,786

=== Final standings ===
Team	Played	Won	Drew	Lost	For	Against	Diff	Points
France	2	2	0	0	28	6	+22	4
England	2	1	0	1	18	9	+9	2
Wales	2	0	0	2	9	40	−31	0
