= 1980 European Rugby League Championship =

1980 European Championship
- Number of teams: 3
- Winner: England (11th title)
- Matches played: 3
- Top scorer: (England) George Fairbairn (15)
- Top try scorer: (France) Joël Roosebrouck (2)

The 1980 European Rugby League Championship was the 21st edition of the Rugby League European Championship, a rugby league tournament that took place in Europe. The tournament saw the same three teams that competed in the previous edition in 1979.

The format was a single round-robin format, with the matches being played between January and March 1980. After the three matches were played, England took out their 11th title by defeating the other two opponents in France and Wales.

== Venues ==
(England) Hull	(France) Narbonne	(England) Widnes
Boothferry Park, Hull	Stade de l'Egassiarial, Narbonne	Naughton Park
Capacity: 15,160	Capacity: 12,000	Capacity: 13,000

== Squads ==
=== France ===
- Jean-Paul Baile (Carcassonne)
- Jean-Marc Bourrel (Carcassonne)
- Delphin Castanon (Lézignan)
- Max Chantal (Villeneuve-sur-Lot)
- Henri Daniel (Pia)
- José Giné (Roanne)
- Jean-Marc Gonzalès (Limoux)
- Ivan Grésèque (XIII Catalan)
- Jacques Guigue (Avignon)
- Didier Hermet (Villeneuve-sur-Lot)
- Christian Laumond (Villfranche)
- Christian Macalli (Villeneuve-sur-Lot)
- André Malacamp (Carcassonne)
- Michel Mazaré (Villeneuve-sur-Lot)
- Michel Naudo (Pia)
- Marcel Pillon (Saint-Estève)
- Sébastien Rodriguez (Toulouse)
- Joël Roosebrouck (Villeneuve-sur-Lot) (Captain)
- Francis Tranier (Villefranche)
- Charles Zalduendo (Toulouse)

=== England ===
- Len Casey
- Des Drummond
- Steve Evans
- George Fairbairn (Captain)
- Peter Gorley
- Jeff Grayshon
- Neil Holding
- Roy Holdstock
- John Joyner
- Harry Pinner
- Keith Rayne
- Alan Redfearn
- Peter Smith
- Mike Smith
- David Ward
- John Woods
- Stuart Wright

=== Wales ===
- John Bevan (Captain)
- Harold Box
- Chris Camilleri
- Steve Diamond
- Colin Dixon
- Clive Griffiths
- Mel James
- Brian Juliff
- Roy Mathias
- Mark McJennett
- Donald Parry
- Paul Prendiville
- Chris Seldon
- Glyn Shaw
- Trevor Skerrett
- Graham Walters
- Paul Woods

== Results ==
26 January

Wales	7 – 21	France
Tries: John Bevan; Goals: Steve Diamond (2); Field Goals:		Tries:Joël Roosebrouck; Jean-Marc Gonzalès; Ivan Grésèque; Goals: Jean-Marc Gonzalès (4); Field Goals: Michel Mazaré

Naughton Park, Widnes
Attendance: 2,804

29 February

England	26 – 9	Wales
Tries: George Fairbairn; Roy Holdstock; John Joyner; Keith Rayne; Goals: George Fairbairn (6); Field Goals: Harry Pinner (2)		Tries: Brian Juliff; Goals: Paul Woods (3)

Boothferry Park, Hull
Attendance: 7,557

16 March

France	2 – 4	England
Tries: Goals: Jean-Marc Bourret (1); Field Goals:		Tries: Goals: Steve Evans; Field Goals: Alan Redfearn

Stade de l'Egassiarial, Narbonne
Attendance: 20,000

=== Final standings ===
Team	Played	Won	Drew	Lost	For	Against	Diff	Points
England	2	2	0	0	30	11	+19	4
France	2	1	0	1	23	11	+12	2
Wales	2	0	0	2	16	47	−31	0
