= Raymond Gruppi =

Former France international rugby league footballer

Personal information
- Born: 30 October 1937 (age 88) Villeneuve-sur-Lot, France
- Height: 5 ft 10 in (1.78 m)
- Weight: 12 st 5 lb (78 kg)

Playing information
- Position: centre, wing
Club
Years	Team	Pld	T	G	FG	P
1955–57	Villeneuve-sur-Lot
1957–59	Battaillon de Joinville
1959–69	Villeneuve-sur-Lot
	Total	0	0	0	0	0
Representative
Years	Team	Pld	T	G	FG	P
1959–71	France	16	9	0	0	27
1960	Rest of the World	6	2		0	6

Coaching information
Club
Years	Team	Gms	W	D	L	W%
1978–82	Villeneuve-sur-Lot
Representative
Years	Team	Gms	W	D	L	W%
1985	France
- Source: As of 19 November 2023
- Relatives: Jacques Gruppi (brother)

Raymond Gruppi (born in Villeneuve-sur-Lot, on 30 September 1937), is a French former rugby league player who played as centre and wing and later was a coach.

== Personal life ==
He is the brother of the former rugby league player Jacques Gruppi, as well of the former rugby union player Pierre Gruppi. His sons are Enzo Gruppi and Thibaut Gruppi, who play for Villeneuve XIII RLLG. In the civil life, outside the field, he worked as a seedsman. He is also a horse trainer

== Biography ==
He spent most of his playing career at Villeneuve-sur-Lot, playing the French Championship, which eventually ended as runner-up in 1965, and at the Lord Derby Cup a season later. With his club performances, he was called up several times for the French national team between 1959 and 1971, taking part in the 1960 and 1970 World Cups.

Later, he was appointed as coach for Villeneuve-sur-Lot with new successes with the victory at the Lord Derby Cup in 1979 and in the French Championship in 1980. He was also appointed as coach for France alongside Jean Panno, debuting with a 24-16 win against Great Britain on 17 March 1985.

He was called up for the France squad at the 1960 Rugby League World Cup alongside his teammates Angélo Boldini, Jacques Dubon, André Lacaze and Jacques Merquey. Later, he was called up again to represent France at the 1970 Rugby League World Cup with his new team mates Jean-Pierre Clar, Gérard Cremoux, Daniel Pellerin and Christian Sabatié.

== Honours ==
=== As player ===
- Team honours :
  - Winner of the French Championship : 1964 (Villeneuve-sur-Lot).
  - Winner of the Lord Derby Cup : 1964 (Villeneuve-sur-Lot).
  - Runner-up at the French Championship : 1962 et 1965 (Villeneuve-sur-Lot).
  - Runner-up at the Lord Derby Cup : 1966 et 1969 (Villeneuve-sur-Lot).

=== As coach ===
- Team honours :
  - Winner of the French Championship : 1980 (Villeneuve-sur-Lot).
  - Winner of the Lord Derby Cup : 1979 (Villeneuve-sur-Lot).
  - Runner-up at the French Championship : 1981 (Villeneuve-sur-Lot).
