= André Vadon =

France rugby league footballer (1934–2024)

Personal information
- Born: 22 June 1934 Marseille, France
- Died: 18 September 2024 (aged 90)

Playing information
- Height: 5 ft 8 in (1.73 m)
- Weight: 12 st 10 lb (81 kg)
- Position: hooker
Club
Years	Team	Pld	T	G	FG	P
19??–19??	Cavaillon
19??–57	Bataillon de Joinville
1957–66	Albi
1966–??	Cavaillon
	Total	0	0	0	0	0
Representative
Years	Team	Pld	T	G	FG	P
1960–63	France	8	2	0	0	0
- Source: As of 12 February 2021

André Vadon (22 July 1934 – 18 September 2024) was a French rugby league footballer who played as hooker.

== Career ==
Debuting for Cavaillon, he made his first steps at the French Championship. He was later called up for the conscription and played for Bataillon de Joinville for two years. Subsequently, Vadon joined the Albi club, where he constituted a formidable forward pack alongside Guy Berthomieu, Jean-Marie Bez, Marcel Bescos and Honoré Conti. Three times he disputed the French Championship final winning two titles in 1958 and 1962 and losing one in 1960 against Roanne with its top players Jean Barthe and Claude Mantoulan. In 1966, he returned to Cavaillon following Georges Fages, to end his career.

Scouted very soon, he was a junior international for France in March 1954 with Jean Vergès (XIII Catalan), Gilbert Alberti (Carcassonne), Georges Fages (Albi), Jean Rouqueirol (Avignon) and his teammates for Cavaillon René Ovili and Jean Leydier. Before a tour of France, Vadon was deemed responsible for pushing a referee Vic Belsham, who collided with Alain Perducat. Said incident had Vadon and Perducat banned from returning to New Zealand. After his sports career, Vadon occupied important roles at FFR XIII. In 1978, he was appointed to the coaching staff of the French national team alongside Roger Garrigue, Pierre Escourrou and José Calle, until 1981, alongside Michel Maïque, Francis Lévy and Jean-Pierre Clar. Thanks to his club-level performances, he represented France between 1956 and 1961, taking part at the 1960 Rugby League World Cup.

== Personal life and death ==
Outside the pitch, Vadon worked as farmer. He died on 18 September 2024, at the age of 90.

== Honours ==
=== As player ===
- Team honours :
  - French Champion in 1958 and 1962 (Albi)
  - Runner-up at the French Championship : 1960 (Toulouse).
