= 1980 European Championship =

1980 European Championship may refer to European Championships held in several sports:

- 1980 European Rugby League Championship
- UEFA Euro 1980 football championship
