= 1981 European Championship =

1981 European Championship can refer to European Championships held in several sports:

- 1981 European Rugby League Championship
- EuroBasket 1981
