= Gérard Crémoux =

France international rugby league player

Personal information
- Born: 4 November 1943 Narbonne, Occitania, France
- Died: 19 August 2023 (aged 79) Villeneuve-sur-Lot, France

Playing information
- Height: 5 ft 7 in (1.70 m)

Rugby union
- Position: Lock
Club
Years	Team	Pld	T	G	FG	P
	Stade Cadurcien

Rugby league
- Position: Second-row
Club
Years	Team	Pld	T	G	FG	P
1968–??	Villeneuve-sur-Lot
Representative
Years	Team	Pld	T	G	FG	P
1969–70	France	2				0

Gérard Crémoux (4 November 1943 in Narbonne – 18 August 2023 in Villeneuve-sur-Lot) was a French rugby league international after debuting in rugby union.

== Biography ==
Crémoux started his sports career by playing rugby union for Cahors Rugby until 1966, when he switched code to rugby league and play for Villeneuve-sur-Lot, with which he played and ended runner-up in the 1969, 1970 and 1972 editions of the Lord Derby Cup. With his club performances, he was called up for the France national team, where he had two caps, taking part also to the 1970 Rugby League World Cup with his teammates Jean-Pierre Clar, Raymond Gruppi, Daniel Pellerin and Christian Sabatié.

== Honours ==
- Team honours:
  - Runner up at the Lord Derby Cup:1969, 1970 and 1972 (Villeneuve-sur-Lot).
