= Darricau =

Darricau is a French surname. Notable people with the surname include:

- Henri Darricau (born 1955), Lebanese fencer
- Jean Darricau (born 1931), French rugby player
- Yves Daniel Darricau (born 1953), Lebanese fencer
- Darry Cowl, born André Darricau
