= René Ferrero =

France international rugby league player

Personal information
- Born: 12 October 1926 Saint-Fons, Lyon Metropolis, Auvergne-Rhône-Alpes, France
- Died: 11 January 1999 (aged 72) Bron, France

Playing information
- Position: Prop
Club
| Years | Team | Pld | T | G | FG | P |
|---|---|---|---|---|---|---|
| | Marseille |
Representative
| Years | Team | Pld | T | G | FG | P |
| 1957 | France | 4 | | | | 1 |

René Ferrero (12 October 1926, Saint-Fons – 11 January 1999, Bron) was a French rugby league footballer. He played as prop.

== Career ==
Ferrero notably played for Marseille XIII and won the Lord Derby Cup in 1957. With his club performances, he was capped four times for the France national team in 1957, contending also the 1957 Rugby League World Cup, where he was called up alongside his teammate Antranick Apellian.

== Honours ==
=== Rugby league ===
- Champion of the Lord Derby Cup: 1957 (Marseille)
- Runner up at the French Rugby League Championship: 1954 (Marseille)
- Runner-up at the Lord Derby Cup: 1955 (Marseille)
