= Daniel Camiade =

France international rugby league & union player (1940–2020)

- Born: 9 April 1940 Millas, Pyrénées-Orientales, Occitania, France
- Died: 12 April 2020 (aged 80) Carcassonne, France

Rugby union career
- Position: Scrum-half
Senior career
Years	Team	Apps	(Points)
- USA Perpignan
- US Quillan
Coaching career
- Years: Team
- 1981–: US Quillan
- Rugby league career

Playing information
Club
Years	Team	Pld	T	G	FG	P
–1978	Saint-Estève XIII Mavericks
Representative
Years	Team	Pld	T	G	FG	P
1971	France	1				8

Coaching information
Club
Years	Team	Gms	W	D	L	W%
1977–	Limoux Grizzlies

Daniel Robert Marie Camiade (9 April 1940 – 12 April 2020) was a French rugby league and rugby union player, who played at the scrum-half position.

== Biography ==
Camiade joined USA Perpignan at a young age. The club made it to the final of the Challenge Yves du Manoir in 1956 against FC Lourdes. He then joined US Quillan, winning a Rugby Pro D2 championship in 1964. He then switched to rugby league with the Saint-Estève XIII Mavericks, winning a French Rugby League Championship in 1971 and the Lord Derby Cup in 1972. He played one game for the French national team in 1971, scoring 8 points. After his playing career, Camiade coached for the Limoux Grizzlies and US Quillan.
