= Rachid Hechiche =

France international rugby league footballer (born 1973)

Personal information
- Born: 4 July 1973 (age 52) France

Playing information
- Position: Prop
Club
Years	Team	Pld	T	G	FG	P
	Lyon Villeurbanne
Representative
Years	Team	Pld	T	G	FG	P
2000–03	France	10	3	0	0	12

Rachid Hechiche is a French rugby league footballer who represented France at the 2000 World Cup.

== Playing career ==
Hechiche played for the Lyon Villeurbanne club in the local French Rugby League Championship. He made his international debut for France in the 2000 World Cup, playing in four matches. In 2001 he was part of the French tour of New Zealand and Papua New Guinea. He last played for France in 2003.
