= Cédric Gay =

France international rugby league player (b.1982)

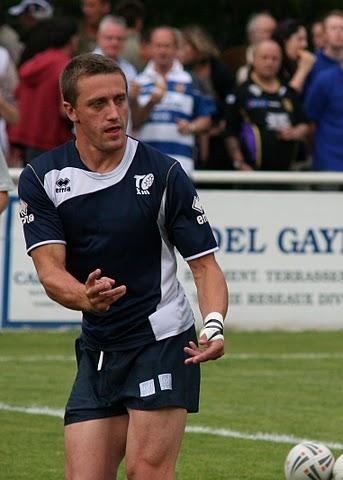

Personal information
- Born: 12 March 1982 (age 43); France

Playing information
- Height: 1.75 m (5 ft 9 in)
- Weight: 79 kg (12 st 6 lb)
- Position: Hooker
Club
Years	Team	Pld	T	G	FG	P
2007–08	Toulouse Olympique in Elite One	9	4	0	0	16
2009	Toulouse Olympique in Championship	9	4	0	0	16
	Total	18	8	0	0	32
Representative
Years	Team	Pld	T	G	FG	P
2003–05	France	4	0	0	0	0

Cédric Gay is a French former professional rugby league footballer who played in the 2000s. He played for Toulouse Olympique in Championship, as a hooker.
