= Abderazak El Khalouki =

France international rugby league footballer (born 1975)

Personal information
- Born: 20 May 1975 (age 51) France

Playing information
- Position: Prop
Club
Years	Team	Pld	T	G	FG	P
1997	Paris Saint-Germain	1	0	0	0	0
2000	Toulouse Olympique
2001	Villeneuve Leopards
2001–11	Villefranche XIII Aveyron
	Total	1	0	0	0	0
Representative
Years	Team	Pld	T	G	FG	P
1997–01	France	9	0	0	0	0

Coaching information
Club
Years	Team	Gms	W	D	L	W%
2007–11	Villefranche XIII Aveyron

Abderazak El Khalouki is a French rugby league footballer who represented France in the 2000 World Cup.

== Playing career ==
Of Moroccan descent, El Khalouki played for Paris Saint-Germain in the Super League competition and also made his début for France in 1997 against South Africa.

Now playing for Toulouse Olympique, El Khalouki was selected in the French squad for the 2000 World Cup. He only played in one match at the tournament, despite being predicted to be the team's star player.

In 2001 he played for the Villeneuve Leopards and was selected in the French squad to play Great Britain.
