= Angélo Boldini =

France international rugby league footballer

Personal information
- Born: 24 October 1929 Labastide-Castel-Amouroux, Lot-et-Garonne, Nouvelle-Aquitaine, France
- Died: 5 April 1994 (aged 64) Libourne, France

Playing information
- Height: 5 ft 11 in (1.80 m)
- Weight: 15 st 7 lb (98 kg)
- Position: prop
Club
Years	Team	Pld	T	G	FG	P
	Libourne
	Bordeaux
	Villeneuve XIII RLLG
	Total	0	0	0	0	0
Representative
Years	Team	Pld	T	G	FG	P
1956–60	France	11
- As of 18 January 2021

Angelo Boldini, (Labastide-Castel-Amouroux (Lot-et-Garonne), 24 October 1929 - Libourne, 5 April 1994) was a French rugby league footballer. He played as a prop, notably for Villeneuve-sur-Lot. Boldini also represented his country at the 1960 Rugby League World Cup.

Outside the field, he worked as a truck driver.

== Rugby league career ==
=== Club ===
- Bordeaux
- Villeneuve-sur-Lot

==== "Honours" ====
- Champion of France: 1954 (Bordeaux), 1958, 1959, (Villeneuve-sur-Lot
- Champion of the Lord Derby Cup: 1958 (Villeneuve-sur-Lot)

=== International ===
- France (11 caps) 1956-60
