= Jacques Gruppi =

France international rugby league player

Personal information
- Born: 6 April 1941 (age 83); Villeneuve-sur-Lot, France
- Height: 5 ft 7.5 in (1.715 m)
- Weight: 12 st 6 lb (79 kg)

Playing information
- Position: Centre
Club
Years	Team	Pld	T	G	FG	P
	Villeneuve-sur-Lot
Representative
Years	Team	Pld	T	G	FG	P
1963–72	France	11	1	0	0	3

Coaching information
Club
Years	Team	Gms	W	D	L	W%
1985–86	Villeneuve-sur-Lot
- Relatives: Raymond Gruppi (brother)

Jacques Gruppi, born in Villeneuve-sur-Lot, on 6 April 1941) is a French former rugby league player, who played as centre. His brothers are Raymond Gruppi, who also was a rugby league player and Pierre Gruppi, a former rugby union player.

== Biography ==
He played for Villeneuve-sur-Lot and also represented France during the 1968 Rugby League World Cup, where he played also in the final lost against Australia.

Outside the sport, he worked as a salesman.

Between 1985 and 1986, Gruppi coached his former club, Villeneuve-sur-Lot.

== Honours ==
- Rugby league :
- World Cup :
  - 1 time runner-up in 1968 (France).
- French Championship :
  - 1-time champion in 1964 (Villeneuve-sur-Lot).
  - 1 time finalist in 1965 (Villeneuve-sur-Lot).
- Lord Derby Cup :
  - 1-time champion in 1964 (Villeneuve-sur-Lot).
  - 4 times finalist in 1966, 1969, 1970 and 1972 (Villeneuve-sur-Lot).

=== International caps ===
==== Cap details ====
Jacques Gruppi international caps
	Date	Venue	Opponent	Result	Competition	Position	Points	Tries	Pen.	Drops
Playing for France
.	8 June 1968	Lang Park, Brisbane, Australia	Australia	4-37	World Cup	Centre	-	-	-	-
.	10 June 1968	Sydney Cricket Ground, Sydney, Australia	Australia	2-20	World Cup	Centre	-	-	-	-
.	1 November 1970	Bradford, England	Australia	17-15	World Cup	Wing	-	-	-	-
