= Jean Foussat =

France international rugby league footballer

Personal information
- Born: 14 December 1931 Brive-la-Gaillarde, Corrèze, Nouvelle-Aquitaine, France
- Died: 3 March 2015 (aged 83) Brive-la-Gaillarde, France

Playing information
- Height: 5 ft 8 in (1.73 m)
- Weight: 12 st 5 lb (78 kg)
- Position: Centre, Wing
Club
Years	Team	Pld	T	G	FG	P
19??–??	Villeneuve-sur-Lot
Representative
Years	Team	Pld	T	G	FG	P
1957–61	France	10	6	0	0	18

Jean Foussat (Brive-la-Gaillarde, 14 December 1931- Brive-la-Gaillarde, 3 March 2015), was a former French rugby league footballer who played as centre or wing.

== Biography ==
During his entire career, Foussat played for Villeneuve-sur-Lot, which he won a French Championship title in 1959. Thanks to his club performances, he represented France at the 1957 Rugby League World Cup.

== Personal life ==
Outside the pitch, he worked as an electrician.

=== Honours ===
- Team :
  - French Champion : in 1959 (Villeneuve-sur-Lot).
