= Samy Masselot =

France international rugby league footballer

Personal information
- Full name: Samy Masselot
- Born: 9 January 1989 (age 37)
- Height: 6 ft 2 in (1.88 m)
- Weight: 17 st 0 lb (108 kg)

Playing information
- Position: Prop, Second-row
Club
Years	Team	Pld	T	G	FG	P
2008–11	Villeneuve Leopards	46	6	0	0	24
2011–12	Wakefield Trinity Wildcats	1	0	0	0	0
2012	Villeneuve Leopards	11	2	0	0	8
2012–16	Toulouse Olympique	59	5	0	0	20
2016–	Villeneuve Leopards	49	6	0	0	24
	Total	166	19	0	0	76
Representative
Years	Team	Pld	T	G	FG	P
2015	France	1	1	0	0	4
- Source: As of 11 January 2021

Samy Masselot (born 9 January 1989) is a French professional rugby league footballer who plays as a prop or second-row forward for Villeneuve XIII RLLG in the Elite One Championship and France at international level.

== Background ==
Masselot was originally from northern France and moved to Pujols, Lot-et-Garonne during his youth.

== Career ==
Masselot has represented French international.

Masselot previously played for Wakefield Trinity Wildcats in the Super League.
