= Guy Husson (rugby) =

France international rugby league & union player

- Full name: Georges Jules Antoine Husson
- Born: 22 November 1931 Toulouse, France
- Died: 26 July 2015 (aged 83) Toulouse, France

Rugby union career
- Position: Wing
Senior career
Years	Team	Apps	(Points)
- Toulouse
- Lourdes
Coaching career
- Years: Team
- Pamiers
- Saverdun
- Toulouse (youth team)
- Rugby league career

Playing information
- Position: Wing
Club
Years	Team	Pld	T	G	FG	P
1954–57	Carcassonne
1957–65	Albi
	Total	0	0	0	0	0
Representative
Years	Team	Pld	T	G	FG	P
1955	France	3

Georges Jules Antoine Husson (Toulouse, 22 November 1931-26 July 2015), better known as Guy Husson, was a French rugby union and league footballer, who played as wing.

== Biography ==
Husson started his career at rugby union for Stade Toulousain, becoming a senior player for said team. He later joined FC Lourdes, playing alongside Maurice Prat, Jean Prat and Jean Barthe.In 1954, Husson switched codes by playing rugby league, doing so by first, playing for AS Carcassonne until 1957, and then, for Albi, where he would play until the end of his playing career. With his performances at club level, Husson represented France three times in 1957, taking part at the Rugby League World Cup of that year.

After his playing career, Husson became a rugby union coach for Pamiers, Saverdun and the Stade Toulousain junior team. He later became technical director for Stade Toulousain.

== Personal life ==
His son, Laurent Husson, is a former rugby union player, who was French Champion with Stade Toulousain in 1985.

== Honours ==
Rugby league:

- Champion of the French Rugby League Championship: 1958 (Albi)
- Runner-up at the French Rugby League Championship: 1955 (Carcassonne)
