= Joël Roosebrouck =

Former France international rugby league player

Personal information
- Full name: Joël Roosebrouck
- Born: 9 September 1953 (age 72) La Cavalerie, Aveyron, Occitania, France

Playing information
- Position: Lock
Club
Years	Team	Pld	T	G	FG	P
1973–74	Bias XIII
1974–86	Villeneuve-Sur-Lot
1986–90	US Trentels XIII
	Total	0	0	0	0	0
Representative
Years	Team	Pld	T	G	FG	P
1977–83	France	22	7	0	0	21
- As of 9 February 2021

Joël Roosebrouck (born in La Cavalerie, 9 September 1953) is a French rugby league player who played as lock forward.

== Biography ==
In 1973, at the age of 19, Roosebrouck started his rugby career. He joined the small club Bias XIII in Lot-et-Garonne before being scouted by Villeneuve-sur-Lot, where he proved himself in a sport which was a passion for him since the beginning. He, who was nicknamed La Rouille (the rust) due to his hair colour, became the emblematic lock forward of the Villeneuve club, giving him "the chance to play with Hermet, to play in tandem with Mazaré and take advantage from Gruppi's advice". Called up for the France junior team since 1976, a year later, he joined the senior team in 1977 for his first tour in Oceania.

After a rookie period at Bias, he joined Villeneuve-sur-Lot, where he played for a great part of his career before ending it playing for Trentels.

His spell at Villeneuve was marked by a French Championship title in 1980. His club performances made him eligible for the France national team which he captained. He notably took part in the 1977 Rugby League World Cup and also took part in several French tours in Australia and New Zealand in the 1980s.

Elected various times as "man of the match", "sportsman of the month", "of the year", "best sportsman from Lot-et-Garonne" at the Oscar du Sud-Ouest and also enthroned as "Paladin", of several marks of recognition gratified him.

From 1984, Roosebrouck started gradually to retire from the French national team to end his rugby career in his club, Villeneuve-sur-Lot, with which he won the Lord Derby Cup that year. Later, in 1986, he joined the Second Division club Trentels-Ladignac and would retire himself after the club won a French second division title.

== Honours ==
=== Club ===
- Champion of the French Championship : 1980 (Villeneuve-sur-Lot).
- Champion of the Lord Derby Cup : 1979 and 1984 (Villeneuve-sur-Lot).
- Runner-up at the French Championship : 1983 and 1984 (Villeneuve-sur-Lot).

=== International ===
- Champion of the Rugby League European Championship: 1977 (France)
