= Yves Mézard =

France international rugby league footballer (1932-2018)

Personal information
- Born: 3 July 1932 Miramas, Bouches-du-Rhône; Provence-Alpes-Côte d'Azur, France
- Died: 7 January 2018 (aged 85) Plan-d'Orgon, France

Playing information
- Height: 5 ft 11 in (1.80 m)
- Weight: 15 st 5 lb (98 kg)
- Position: second-row
Club
Years	Team	Pld	T	G	FG	P
19??–??	Cavaillon
Representative
Years	Team	Pld	T	G	FG	P
1960	France	1	0	0	0	0

Coaching information
Club
Years	Team	Gms	W	D	L	W%
	Cavaillon
- Source: As of 12 February 2021

Yves Mézard (Miramas, 3 July 1932 - Plan-d'Orgon, 7 January 2018), was a French rugby league player in the 1950s and 1960s.

He played his entire club career for Cavaillon with which he competed in the French Championship.

Thanks to his club performances, he was selected to play for France in 1960. Being the only representative of his club, he played the 1960 Rugby League World Cup.

== Biography ==
Being the only representative for Cavaillon, he was part of the 18 players called up to represent France at the 1960 Rugby League World Cup in England. Outside the pitches, he worked as a railroad employee.

== Honours ==
=== International caps ===
International matches
	Date	Opponent	Result	Competition	Position	Points	Tries	Field goals	Drops
1.	1	Great Britain	7-33	World Cup	Second row	0	0	0	0
