= Mourad Kriouache =

France international rugby league footballer

Mourad Kriouche
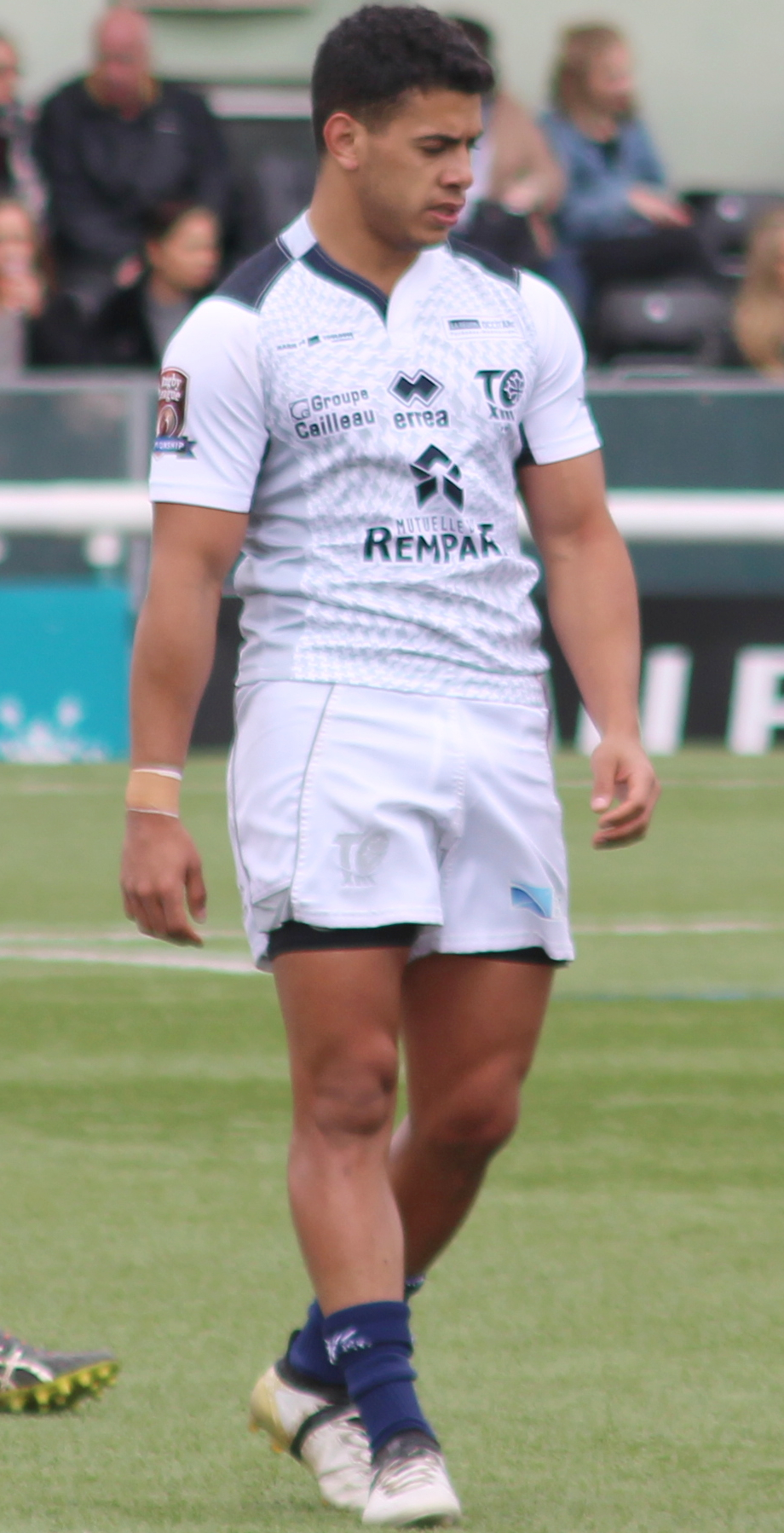

Personal information
- Born: 10 March 1991 (age 35) France
- Height: 5 ft 8 in (1.73 m)
- Weight: 13 st 2 lb (83 kg)

Playing information
- Position: Scrum-half, Hooker
Club
Years	Team	Pld	T	G	FG	P
2010–11	Carcassonne XIII	19	10	27	0	94
2011	London Skolars	7	1	0	0	4
2011–18	Toulouse Olympique	134	35	22	0	184
2019–20	Limoux Grizzlies
2020–	Villeneuve Leopards
	Total	160	46	49	0	282
Representative
Years	Team	Pld	T	G	FG	P
2015	France	1	1	0	0	4
- Source: As of 11 January 2021

Mourad Kriouache (born 10 March 1991) is a French professional rugby league footballer who plays as a scrum-half or hooker for Villeneuve in the Elite One Championship.

== Playing career ==
Kriouache has previously played for the London Skolars. He has also played for Carcassonne XIII, Toulouse Olympique Broncos in the French competition and Toulouse Olympique in the Championship.

=== Villeneuve XIII RLLG ===
On 20 Oct 2020 it was reported that he had signed for Villeneuve XIII RLLG in the Elite One Championship

== International ==
Kriouache is a French international. He has also represented France at junior level.

== Personal ==
His brother Hosni Kriouache is also a professional rugby league footballer.
