= Éric Anselme =

French rugby league footballer

Eric Anselme
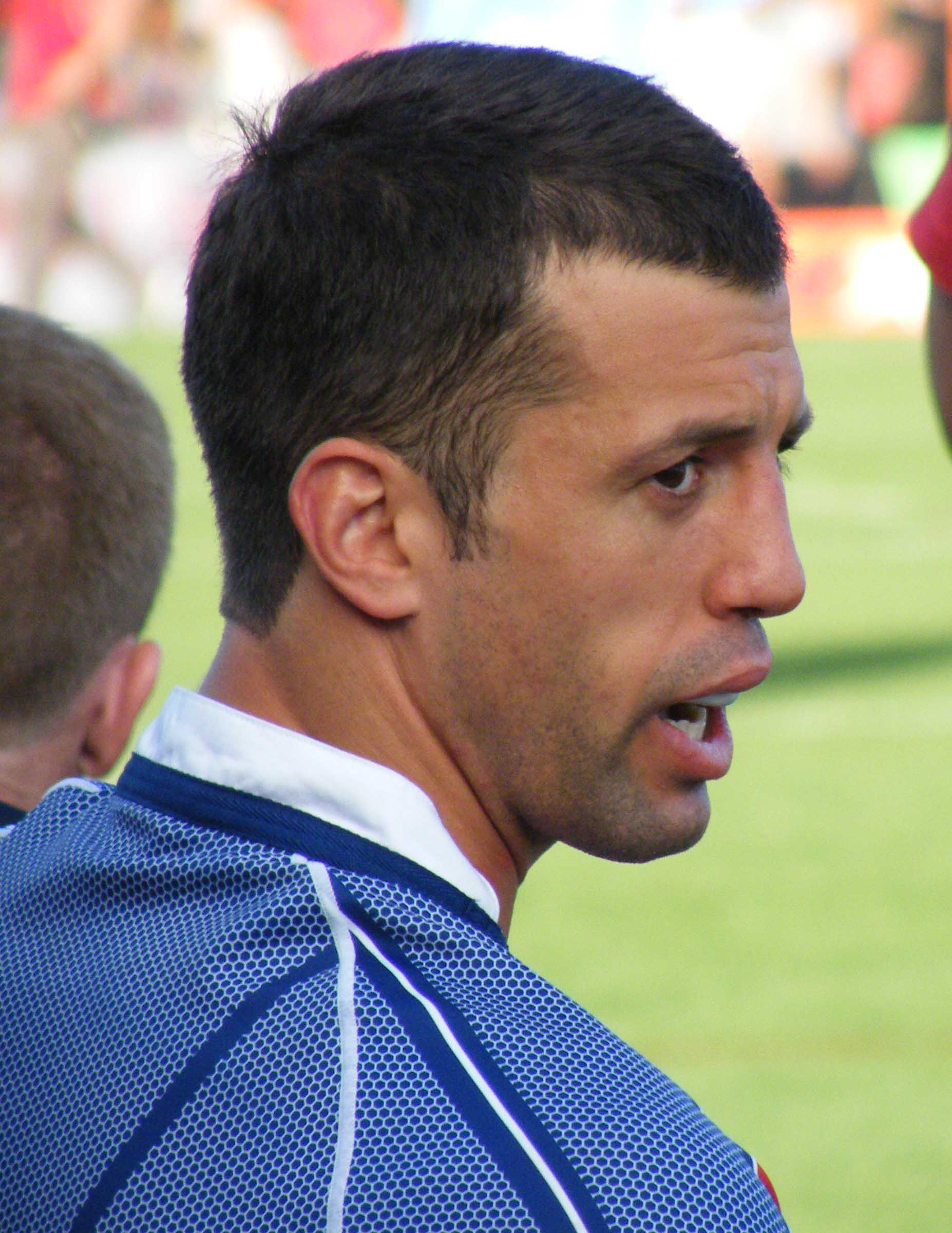

Personal information
- Full name: Éric Anselme
- Born: 20 May 1978 (age 47) Toulouse, France

Playing information
- Height: 6 ft 2 in (1.87 m)
- Weight: 14 st 13 lb (95 kg)
- Position: Centre, Second-row
Club
Years	Team	Pld	T	G	FG	P
1991–95	RC Albi
1996–98	Halifax Blue Sox	12	3	0	0	0
1999–01	Penrith Panthers	0	0	0	0	0
2001–06	St Gaudens	104	16	2	0	68
2007–08	RC Albi	27	7	0	0	28
2008–09	Leeds Rhinos	8	2	0	0	8
2009–11	Toulouse Olympique	66	9	0	0	36
	Total	217	37	2	0	140
Representative
Years	Team	Pld	T	G	FG	P
2000–09	France	29	8	0	0	32

Éric Anselme (born 20 May 1978) is a French professional rugby league coach who is the assistant coach at Toulouse Olympique in the Super League and a former professional rugby league footballer who played in the 1990s and 2000s, former head coach of RC Albi XIII in the Elite One Championship and of the U19 French national team.

He played at club level for Toulouse Olympique and Leeds Rhinos Heritage number 1373. He has previously played for St Gaudens and Racing Club Albi XIII in the French Rugby League Championship competition.

== Playing career ==
In the early part of his career he played numerous times in the Halifax RLFC Alliance team Heritage number 1105, and made his début in the 32–0 defeat by Paris, played in Narbonne.

He has also appeared for the French national side on 29 occasions, including on the 2001 tour of New Zealand and Papua New Guinea, and at the 2008 Rugby League World Cup.

== Coaching career ==
Anselme was the head coach at RC Albi XIII from 2016 to 2019. In January 2022, he was appointed as the head coach of the U19 French national team. Anselme joined Toulouse Olympique as an assistant coach ahead of the 2023 season.
