= Rudi Wulf =

NZ international rugby union player

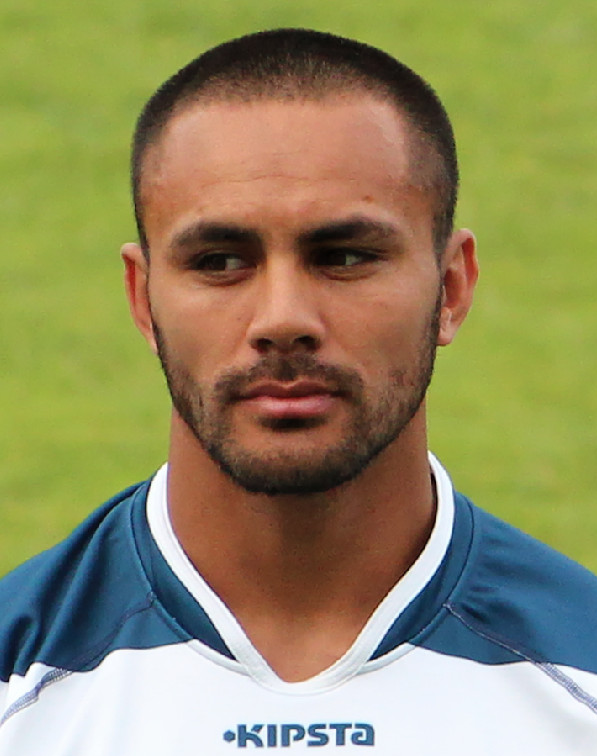
- Wulf in 2015
- Born: Rudolffe Wulf; 2 February 1984 (age 42) Gisborne, New Zealand
- Height: 1.82 m (6 ft 0 in)
- Weight: 91 kg (14 st 5 lb)
- School: Rosmini College

Rugby union career
- Position: Utility back
Senior career
Years	Team	Apps	(Points)
2010–11, 2012–15	Toulon	84	(90)
2016	Castres Olympique	14	(5)
2016–	Lyon OU	87	(35)
- Correct as of 1 September 2021
Provincial / State sides
Years	Team	Apps	(Points)
2003–09, 11–12	North Harbour	71	(85)
- Correct as of 7 July 2014
Super Rugby
Years	Team	Apps	(Points)
2005–10, 2012	Blues	50	(100)
- Correct as of 12 February 2017
International career
Years	Team	Apps	(Points)
2007	Junior All Blacks	1	(5)
2008	New Zealand	4	(0)
- Correct as of 14 July 2012

Rudi Wulf (born 2 February 1984) is a New Zealand rugby union player who plays for Lyon in the French Top 14. He previously played for Toulon and Castres Olympique.

Wulf has also played for North Harbour in the Air New Zealand Cup and the Auckland-based Blues in the Super 14 competition. He played for Marist in the North Harbour premier competition.

Wulf is regarded as a three quarter, in that he can play wing, fullback and outside centre.

He attended high school at Rosmini College where he played 1st XV rugby alongside fellow former All Black, Anthony Boric.

Wulf's career almost ended before it began when, in June 2005, he suffered a serious injury by diving into the shallow end of a swimming pool and fracturing vertebrae in his neck. He made a full recovery.

He is related to French rugby league international Vincent Wulf.
