= Patrick Baco =

Former France international rugby league footballer

Personal information
- Born: 7 February 1962 (age 63) France

Playing information
- Position: hooker
Club
Years	Team	Pld	T	G	FG	P
1982–88	XIII Catalan
Representative
Years	Team	Pld	T	G	FG	P
1986	France	2	0	0	0	0
- Source: http://www.rugbyleagueproject.org/players/patrick-baco/summary.html

Patrick Baco (born on 7 February 1962) is a French former rugby league player who played as hooker.

== Rugby league career ==
=== Club ===
- XIII Catalan

==== Honours ====
French Championship

- Champion in 1983, 1984 and 1985
- Runner-up in 1986, 1988

Lord Derby Cup

- Champion in 1985
- Runner-up in 1983, 1987

=== International caps ===
- France (2 caps) 1986, against :
  - Great Britain
