= Jean-Christophe Borlin =

Former France international rugby league footballer

Personal information
- Born: 21 December 1976 (age 49) France

Playing information
- Position: Prop, Second-row
Club
Years	Team	Pld	T	G	FG	P
2002	Saint-Gaudens Bears
2008	Doncaster R.L.F.C.	4	1	0	0	4
2009	Toulouse Olympique	12	1	0	0	4
	Total	16	2	0	0	8
Representative
Years	Team	Pld	T	G	FG	P
1999–08	France	19	3	0	0	12

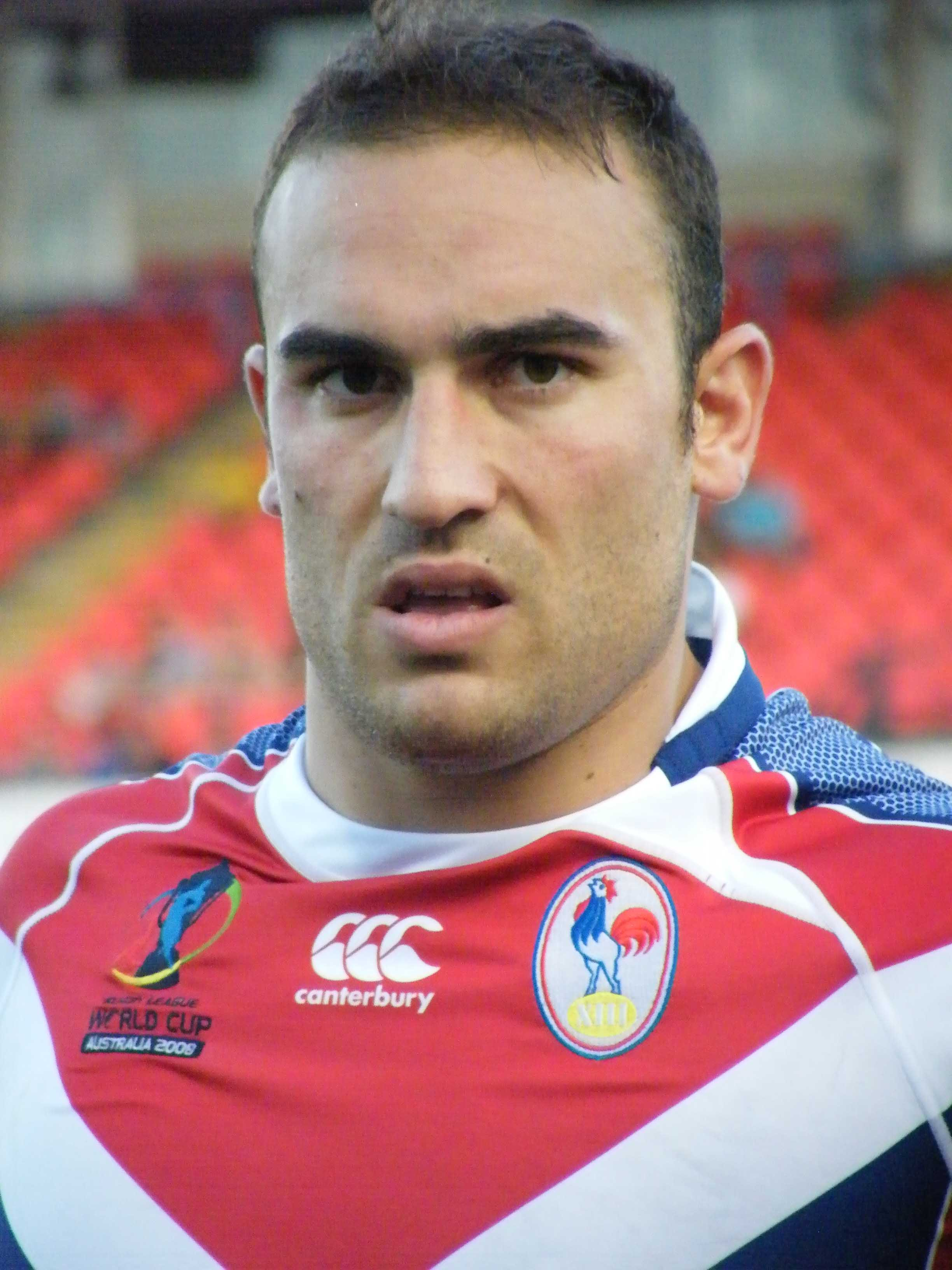
RLWC 2008 - Jean-Christophe

Jean-Christophe Borlin (born 21 December 1976) is a French former professional rugby league footballer who played for Toulouse Olympique in the Co-operative Championship rugby league competition and for St Gaudens club in the French Rugby League Championship competition. He also had a spell at Championship 1 club Doncaster.

He played on the 2001 tour of New Zealand and Papua New Guinea. He was in the French squad for the 2008 World Cup.
