= 2001 France rugby league tour of New Zealand and Papua New Guinea =

The 2001 French rugby league tour of New Zealand and Papua New Guinea was a tour by the France national rugby league team.

== Background ==
The French arrived in the Southern Hemisphere having put in mediocre performance in the 2000 World Cup. The side finished with a 2-win, 2 loss record. The two losses being to Papua New Guinea (20-23) and New Zealand (6-54 in the quarterfinals).

== Squad ==
The French squad included Eric Anselme (St Gaudens), Frederic Banquet (Villeneueve), Patrice Benausse (Carcassonne), David Berthezene (UTC), Laurent Carrasco (Villeneueve), Jean-Emmanuel Cassin (Toulouse), Gilles Cornut, Fabien Devecchi (c - Avignon), Yaccine Dekkiche (Avignon), Arnaud Dulac (St Gaudens), Laurent Frayssinous (Villeneueve), Romain Gagilazzo (Villeneueve), Renaud Guigue (Avignon), Rachid Hechiche (Lyon), Sylvain Houles (UTC), Pascal Jampy (UTC), Patrick Noguerra (Pia), Nicholas Piccolo (Limoux), Artie Shead (Villeneueve), Romain Sort (Villeneueve), Gael Tallec (UTC), Michael Van Snick, Jerome Vincent (Toulouse), Frédéric Teixido (Limoux), Jean-Christophe Borlin (St Gaudens) and Vincent Wulf (Villeneueve).

They were coached by Gilles Dumas.

== Fixtures ==
The test match against New Zealand was celebrating the 50th Anniversary of the first test match held between the two nations in New Zealand, held during the 1951 French tour of New Zealand.

The French team also played three matches against regional selections; Northern Districts, Central Districts and the South Island. France won all three of these games, defeating the South Island 24–11 at Lancaster Park, Central Districts 28–26 at the Palmerston North Showgrounds and Northern Districts 40–16 in Huntly. Jeff Whittaker coached the South Island team that featured mainly Canterbury Bulls players. The team was captained by Shane Beyers and included Aaron Whittaker. Northern Districts included Lance Hohaia and Hare Te Rangi.

Date	Opponent	Venue	Result	Score	Attendance	Report
2 June	South Island	Lancaster Park, Christchurch	Won	24-18		
6 June	Central Districts	Palmerston North Showgrounds, Palmerston North	Won	28-26		
10 June	New Zealand	Ericsson Stadium, Auckland	Loss	0-36	4,500	
13 June	Northern Districts	Davis Park, Huntly	Won	40-16		
17 June	Papua New Guinea	Lloyd Robson Oval, Port Moresby	Won	27-16	15,000	
20 June	Papua New Guinea	Danny Leahy Oval, Goroka	Loss	24-34	12,000	
