= Laurent Carrasco =

Former France international rugby league footballer

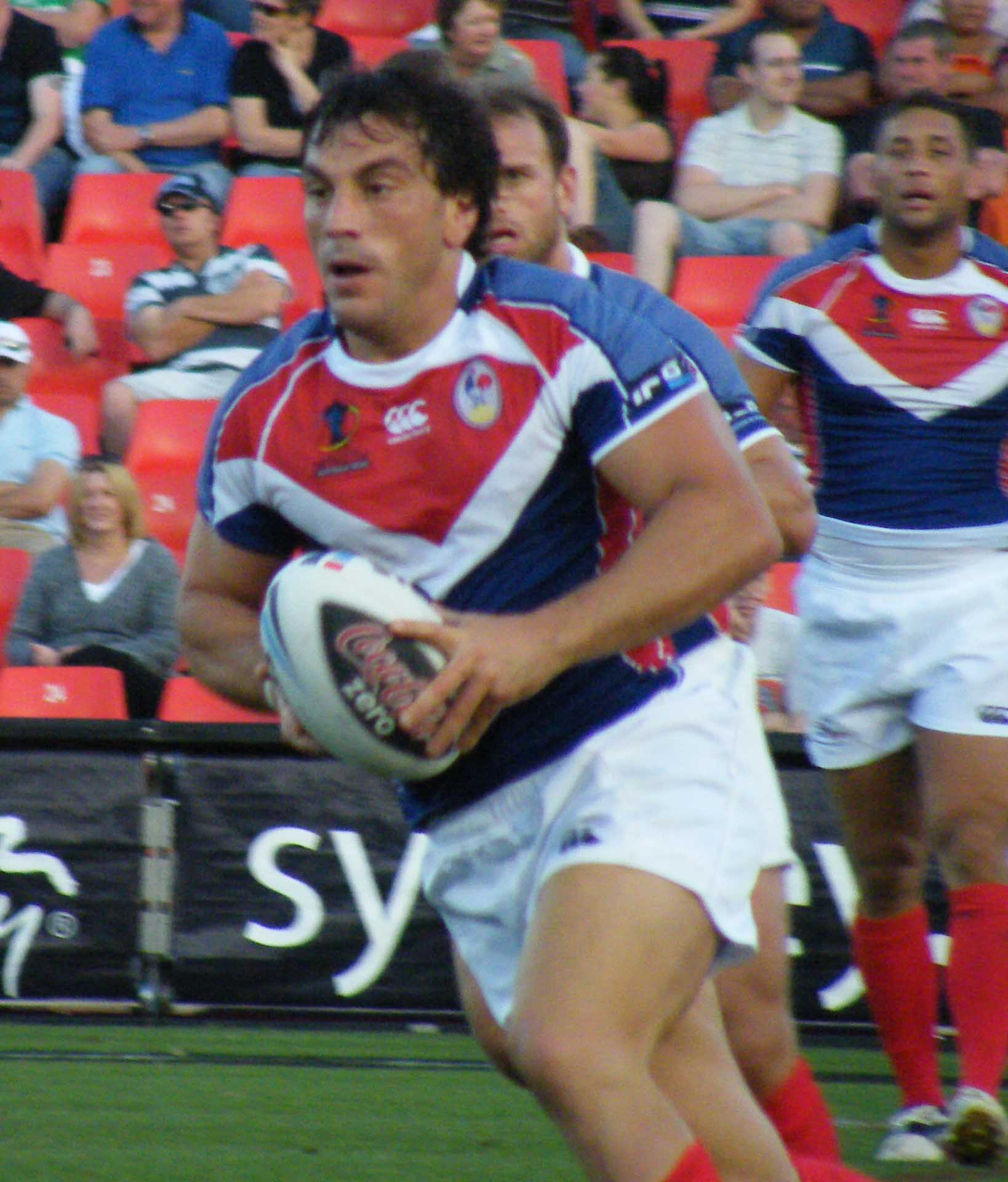
- Carrasco playing for France at the 2008 Rugby League World Cup

Personal information
- Full name: Laurent Carrasco
- Born: 6 September 1976 (age 50) Villeneuve-sur-Lot, Lot-et-Garonne, Nouvelle-Aquitaine, France

Playing information
- Position: loose forward
Club
Years	Team	Pld	T	G	FG	P
2000–02	Villeneuve Leopards	8
2008	Toulouse Olympique	1
	Total	9	0	0	0	0
Representative
Years	Team	Pld	T	G	FG	P
1998–2008	France	38	1	0	0	4
- Source: As of 18 January 2021

Laurent Carrasco (born 6 September 1976) is a former French rugby league footballer who last played as a loose forward for Villeneuve XIII RLLG in the Elite One Championship.

== Background ==
Laurent Carrasco was born in Villeneuve-sur-Lot, Lot-et-Garonne, France.

== Representative career ==
Carrasco is a French international and played at the 2000 and 2008 World Cups and on the 2001 tour to New Zealand and Papua New Guinea.
