= Maxime Grésèque =

French professional rugby league footballer

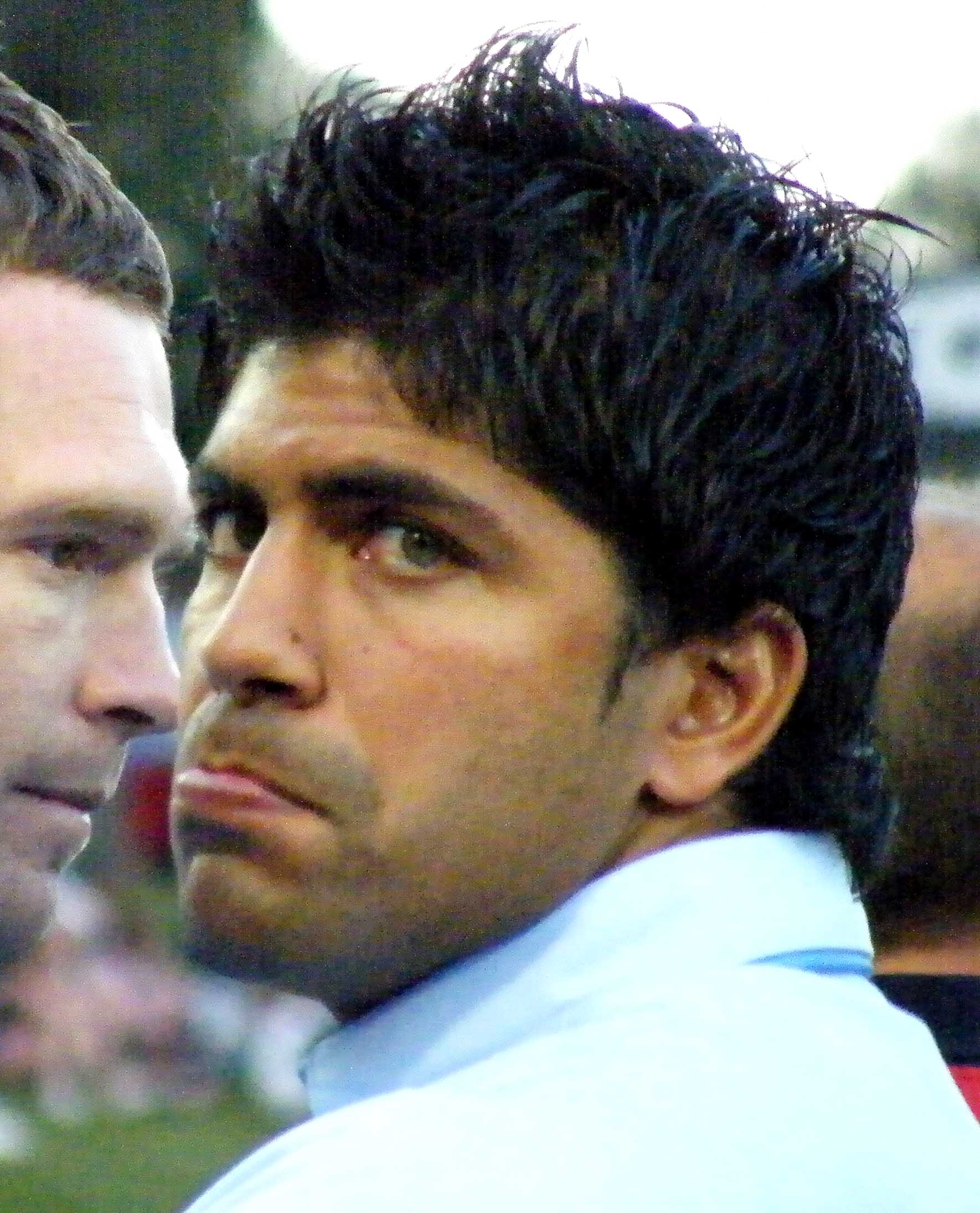

Personal information
- Born: 18 March 1981 (age 45) Perpignan, Pyrénées-Orientales, France

Playing information
- Position: Scrum-half
Club
Years	Team	Pld	T	G	FG	P
2004	Featherstone Rovers	11	3	17	3	49
2005–13	Pia	89	68	24	10	240
2007(loan)	→Wakefield Trinity Wildcats	3	0	0	0	0
2013–17	AS Carcassonne	71	25	47	13	228
	Total	174	96	88	26	517
Representative
Years	Team	Pld	T	G	FG	P
2003–11	France	25	22	64	0	216

Coaching information
Club
Years	Team	Gms	W	D	L	W%
	Limoux Grizzlies
- Father: Ivan Grésèque

Maxime Grésèque (born 18 March 1981) is a French former professional rugby league footballer who is currently head coach of the Limoux Grizzlies. He was a France international representative goal-kicking stand-off or scrum-half.

He has previously played for SM Pia XIII, AS Carcassonne and the Wakefield Trinity Wildcats in the Super League.

Grésèque is the son of former French international and coach, Ivan Grésèque.

== Playing career ==
Greseque played from the bench for France against the touring Australian Kangaroos at the end of the 2005 season, scoring a try.

He was named in the France squad for the 2008 Rugby League World Cup.

He was also named in the French national squad for the 2009 Four Nations, involving the French, English, New Zealand and Australian sides. Grésèque played for France again in the 2010 European Cup.
