= Chris Seldon =

Wales international rugby league footballer

Personal information
- Full name: Christopher Seldon
- Born: 18 July 1953 (age 71); Glyncoch, Wales

Playing information

Rugby union
- Position: Back row
Club
Years	Team	Pld	T	G	FG	P
1973–79	Pontypridd RFC
Representative
Years	Team	Pld	T	G	FG	P
1975	Wales 'B'

Rugby league
- Position: Prop, Second-row
Club
Years	Team	Pld	T	G	FG	P
1979–81	St. Helens	26	1	0	0	3
1981–84	Cardiff City Blue Dragons
1984–85	Southend Invicta
	Total	26	1	0	0	3
Representative
Years	Team	Pld	T	G	FG	P
1980	Wales	2

Christopher Seldon (born 18 July 1953) is a Welsh former rugby union and professional rugby league footballer who played in the 1970s and 1980s. He played representative level rugby union (RU) for Wales 'B', and at club level for Pontypridd RFC, as a back row, i.e. flanker, or number eight, and representative level rugby league (RL) for Wales, and at club level for St. Helens and Cardiff City Blue Dragons, as a prop, or second-row.

== Background ==
Chris Seldon was born in Glyncoch, Wales, having originally worked as a machine operator, and served in the Welsh Guards, he later set up his own insurance company in Pontypridd.

== Playing career ==
Chris Seldon came up through the ranks of Pontypridd Youth before progressing to the club's senior team in 1973.

Time spent in service with the Welsh Guards, alongside his Ponty back row partner, Michael "Mike" Shellard, helped mould Chris into a hard as nails back row forward who gave nor asked any quarter on the field of play.

Gaining honours with Wales 'B' against the touring Pumas of Argentina in 1975, Chris was a member of the senior national squad, but unlucky not to win a full Welsh cap.

== International honours ==
Chris Seldon represented Wales 'B' (RU) in 1975 while at Pontypridd against Argentina (Los Pumas), and was a member of the senior squad, and won caps for Wales (RL) while at St. Helens in 1980 1-cap + 1-cap (interchange/substitute).
