= Max Chantal =

French rugby league footballer (1958–2023)

Personal information
- Born: 21 August 1958 Villeneuve-sur-Lot, France
- Died: 9 January 2023 (aged 64)

Playing information
- Position: Prop, Second-row
Club
| Years | Team | Pld | T | G | FG | P |
|---|---|---|---|---|---|---|
| | US Villeneuve XIII |
Representative
| Years | Team | Pld | T | G | FG | P |
| 1977–86 | France | 27 | 0 | 0 | 0 | 0 |

Max Chantal (21 August 1958 – 9 January 2023) was a French rugby league player who represented France in the 1977 and 1985–1988 Rugby League World Cups.

== Honours ==
- Team Honours:
  - Winner of the European Nations Cup: 1981 (France).
  - Winner of the French Championship: 1980 (Villeneuve-sur-Lot).
  - Winner of the Lord Derby Cup: 1979 and 1984 (Villeneuve-sur-Lot).
  - Runner-up at the French Championship: 1974, 1981, 1983 and 1984 (Villeneuve-sur-Lot).

== Personal life ==
His son, Benoît Chantal was also a rugby league player for Villeneuve-sur-Lot.
