= Labastide-Castel-Amouroux =

- Commune
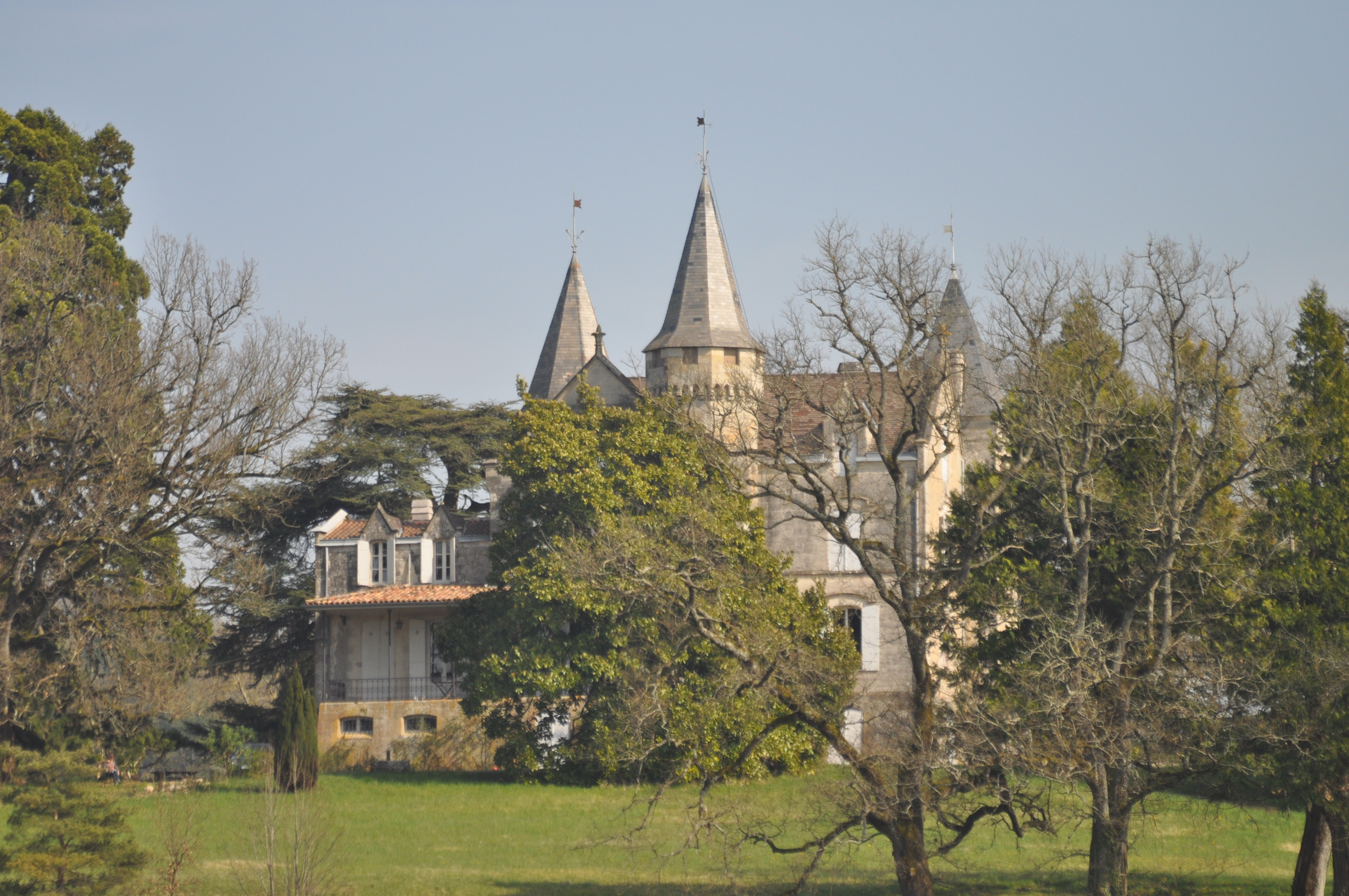
- The Chateau of Plantey
- Location of Labastide-Castel-Amouroux
- Location within France Location within Nouvelle-Aquitaine
- Coordinates: 44°20′25″N 0°07′34″E
- Country: France
- Region: Nouvelle-Aquitaine
- Department: Lot-et-Garonne
- Arrondissement: Marmande
- Canton: Les Forêts de Gascogne
- Intercommunality: CC Coteaux et Landes de Gascogne

Government
  - Mayor (2020–2026): Nicole Bernadet
- Area^{1}: 11.95 km^{2} (4.61 sq mi)
- Elevation: 120 m (390 ft)
- Highest elevation: 172 m (564 ft)
- Lowest elevation: 51 m (167 ft)
- Population (2023): 317
  - Density: 26.5/km^{2} (68.7/sq mi)
- Time zone: UTC+01:00 (CET)
  - Summer (DST): UTC+02:00 (CEST)
- INSEE/Postal code: 47121 /47250
- ^{1} French Land Register data, which excludes lakes, ponds, glaciers > 1 km^{2} (0.386 sq mi or 247 acres) and river estuaries.

Labastide-Castel-Amouroux (French pronunciation: [labastid kastɛl amuʁu]; Occitan: La Bastida Castèthamorós) is a commune in the Lot-et-Garonne department in south-western France.

== See also ==
- Communes of the Lot-et-Garonne department
