= Laurent Frayssinous =

Professional RL coach and former France international rugby league footballer

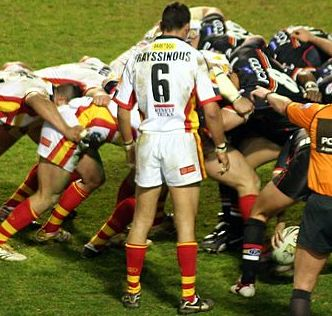

Personal information
- Born: 7 May 1977 (age 49) Villeneuve-sur-Lot, France

Playing information
- Position: Fullback, Stand-off
Club
Years	Team	Pld	T	G	FG	P
	Villeneuve
	UTC
2006	Catalans Dragons	19	4	37	0	90
	Total	19	4	37	0	90
Representative
Years	Team	Pld	T	G	FG	P
1999–05	France	25	7	44	0	116

Coaching information
Club
Years	Team	Gms	W	D	L	W%
2013–17	Catalans Dragons	139	66	6	67	47
2020	Ottawa Aces	0	0	0	0
	Total	139	66	6	67	47
Representative
Years	Team	Gms	W	D	L	W%
2021–	France	12	5	0	7	42
- Source: As of 2 November 2026

Laurent Frayssinous (born 7 May 1977) is a French professional rugby league coach who is the head coach of France at international level and former professional rugby league footballer.

He played for the Catalans Dragons in the Super League and France at international level. He coached Les Catalans in the Super League. He was due to take control of the Ottawa Aces before the club withdrew from the English pyramid.

== Playing career ==
He represented France in the halves in the 2000 World Cup. Whilst playing for Villeneuve Leopards Frayssinous was selected to play at stand-off for France on the 2001 France tour of New Zealand and Papua New Guinea. He also played in a match against the touring Australian Kangaroos at the end of the 2005 season, scoring a try and kicking two goals. Frayssinous played for Catalans Dragons when they reached the quarter-finals of the 2006 Challenge Cup.

== Coaching career ==
=== Catalans Dragons ===
At the end of the 2012 season, Laurent Frayssinous was appointed head coach of the Catalans Dragons on a two-year contract, replacing Trent Robinson, who had left to coach the Sydney Roosters. At 35, he was the youngest coach in the Super League at the time, and the first French coach of the Perpignan-based club. On 22 May 2017, after a 10-18 defeat by the Huddersfield Giants, he was dismissed by the board of directors at the club.

=== Ottawa Aces ===
On 2 July 2020, Frayssinous was appointed as the first head coach of the Ottawa Aces for their inaugural season in RFL League 1 in 2021. However, due to the COVID-19 pandemic and subsequent financial issues the Ottawa Aces club folded before playing a match and were forced to withdraw from the competition.

=== France ===
In 2021, Laurent was appointed head-coach of the France national team.

=== St Helens ===
In Oct 2022, Laurent was appointed assistant-coach at St Helens R.F.C., concurrently with his role as the France head-coach position.
