= Vincent Wulf =

France international rugby league footballer

Personal information
- Born: 5 January 1973 (age 53) New Zealand
- Height: 175 cm (5 ft 9 in)
- Weight: 95 kg (14 st 13 lb)

Playing information
- Position: Hooker, Lock
Club
Years	Team	Pld	T	G	FG	P
1996–97	Paris Saint-Germain	17	5
1997–03	Villeneuve Leopards	6	3	0	0	12
	Total	23	8	0	0	12
Representative
Years	Team	Pld	T	G	FG	P
1997–03	France	19	2	0	0	8

Coaching information
Club
Years	Team	Gms	W	D	L	W%
2006–07	Villeneuve Leopards
- Source: RLP

Vincent Wulf (born 5 January 1973) is a former France international rugby league footballer who represented France at the 2000 World Cup.

== Playing career ==
A Marist Saints representative in the Auckland Rugby League competition, Wulf first moved to France in 1996 to join the Paris Saint-Germain Rugby League club. The club was dissolved at the end of the 1997 season and Wulf moved to join the Villeneuve Leopards in the French championship.

In 2000, Wulf was picked for the French squad for the 2000 World Cup where he played in four matches. Wulf also toured New Zealand and Papua New Guinea in 2001 with the French side.

== Personal life ==
Wulf is part of a sporting family, being related to Auckland Rugby Union representative Eddie and All Blacks representative Rudi.

He is of German-Samoan origin.
