= Frédéric Teixido =

Former France international rugby league footballer

Personal information
- Born: 27 May 1972 (age 53) France

Playing information
- Height: 186 cm (6 ft 1 in)
- Weight: 98 kg (15 st 6 lb)
- Position: Prop
Club
Years	Team	Pld	T	G	FG	P
	Limoux Grizzlies
1996–97	Paris Saint-Germain
1999	Sheffield Eagles	4	0	0	0	0
	Limoux Grizzlies
	Total	4	0	0	0	0
Representative
Years	Team	Pld	T	G	FG	P
1994–01	France

Frédéric Teixido (born 27 May 1972) is a French former professional rugby league footballer who represented France in the 1995 and 2000 World Cups.

== Playing career ==
Teixido began his career with the Limoux Grizzlies. In 1994 he was selected by France and played in a test match against Great Britain.

He was subsequently selected to play for France in the 1995 World Cup. In 1996 Teixido moved to the Super League, joining the Paris Saint Germain club.

Teixido spent 1999 with the Sheffield Eagles in the Super League. He was again selected for France for the 2000 World Cup.

In 2001 he toured New Zealand and Papua New Guinea with the French national side. By this time he was playing for the Limoux Grizzlies again.
