= Pierre Escourrou =

France international rugby league player (1937–2022)

Personal information
- Born: 17 February 1937 France
- Died: 22 January 2022 (aged 84)

Playing information
- Position: Loose forward
Club
| Years | Team | Pld | T | G | FG | P |
|---|---|---|---|---|---|---|
| 1955–57 | AS Carcassonne |
| 1957–59 | Bataillon de Joinville |
| 1959–62 | AS Carcassonne |
| 1962–64 | Limoux Grizzlies |
| 1964–69 | AS Carcassonne |
| | Total | 0 | 0 | 0 | 0 | 0 |
Representative
| Years | Team | Pld | T | G | FG | P |
| 1963 | France | 1 |

Pierre Escourrou (17 February 1937 – 22 January 2022) was a French rugby league player. He played as a loose forward during the 1950s and 60s.

== Biography ==
Escourrou played nearly his entire professional career with AS Carcassonne, with brief stints playing for Bataillon de Joinville and Limoux Grizzlies. With Carcassonne, he won the French Rugby League Championship in 1966 and 1967. He was also the winner of the Coupe de France Lord Derby in 1961, 1967, and 1968. He was selected for the France national team for a game against Great Britain on 3 April 1963. He retired from playing in 1969.

He died on 22 January 2022, at the age of 84.
