= Ivan Grésèque =

Former France rugby league international coach & player

Personal information
- Born: 20 July 1953 (age 72) Saïgon–Cholon, French Indochina

Playing information
- Position: Scrum-half
Club
Years	Team	Pld	T	G	FG	P
1973–88	XIII Catalan
Representative
Years	Team	Pld	T	G	FG	P
1978–85	France	16	4	0	0	12

Coaching information
Club
Years	Team	Gms	W	D	L	W%
1991–93	XIII Catalan
Representative
Years	Team	Gms	W	D	L	W%
1995–97	France	14	1	3	10	7
- Relatives: Maxime Grésèque (son)

Ivan Grésèque (born 23 July 1953) is a French former professional rugby league footballer, coach and manager who represented France.

== Background ==
Grésèque was born in Saïgon–Cholon. He has Indian heritage on his father's side, hence his nickname Bengali. His son, Maxime, has also represented France as a scrum-half.

== Playing career ==
His playing career for XIII Catalan was marked by the French Championship and Lord Derby Cup titles.

Grésèque made his international debut for France against Australia in the last match of the 1978 Kangaroo tour. He then played for France in the 1980 European Championship. Grésèque went on to play sixteen times for France at halfback, his last a 22–0 defeat by New Zealand in 1985.

== Coaching career ==
In 1994 Grésèque was appointed the head coach of the France. He was in charge of the side at the 1995 World Cup. Grésèque's spell as head coach was not successful and he finished with a record of ten losses, three draws and only one win.

Grésèque later became the national side's manager and he was part of the organisation at the 2000 World Cup.

== Honours ==
- French Champion : 1979, 1982, 1983, 1984, 1985 and 1987 (XIII Catalan).
- Champion of the Lord Derby Cup : 1976, 1978, 1980 and 1985 (XIII Catalan).
- Runner-up of the French Championship : 1976, 1978 and 1986 (XIII Catalan).
- Runner-up of the Lord Derby Cup : 1977 and 1983 (XIII Catalan).
