= Romain Sort =

France international rugby league footballer (born 1974)

Personal information
- Born: 21 August 1974 (age 51) France
- Height: 183 cm (6 ft 0 in)
- Weight: 97 kg (15 st 4 lb)

Playing information
- Position: Prop, Second-row
Club
Years	Team	Pld	T	G	FG	P
	Paris Saint-Germain
	Villeneuve
	Total	0	0	0	0	0
Representative
Years	Team	Pld	T	G	FG	P
1998–01	France	15	4	0	0	16

Romain Sort is a French rugby league footballer who represented France at the 2000 World Cup.

== Playing career ==
In 1997 Sort was part of the Paris Saint-Germain Rugby League which played in Super League II. He later played for the Villeneuve Leopards.

He made his debut for France in 1998 against Ireland. In 2000 he was named as part of the French squad for the 2000 World Cup and went on to play in three matches in the tournament. He toured New Zealand and Papua New Guinea in 2001, finishing his career having played in 15 matches for France.
