= Jacques Dubon =

Former France RL international rugby footballer

Personal information
- Full name: Jacques Pierre Dubon
- Born: 28 May 1931 Moissac, Tarn-et-Garonne, Occitania, France
- Died: 22 February 2008 (aged 76) Villeneuve-sur-Lot, France

Playing information
- Height: 5 ft 6 in (1.68 m)
- Weight: 11 st 0 lb (70 kg)
- Position: Wing
Club
Years	Team	Pld	T	G	FG	P
19??–65	Villeneuve-sur-Lot
1965–??	La Réole
19??–??	Clairac
	Total	0	0	0	0	0
Representative
Years	Team	Pld	T	G	FG	P
1960–62	France	12	0	0	0	12
- Source: As of 17 January 2021

Jacques Dubon (Moissac, 28 May 1931 - Villeneuve-sur-Lot, 22 February 2008) was a French rugby league player of the 1950s and 1960s. Dubon played for Villeneuve-sur-Lot for much of his career, with which he won the French Championship in 1959 and 1964, as well as the Lord Derby Cup in 1958 and 1964. He ended his career for La Réole and then for Clairac. He was capped 12 times for the French national team between 1960 and 1962 and took part in the 1960 Rugby League World Cup.

== Biography ==
Outside the field, he worked as an accountant.

== Honours ==
- Team honours :
  - French Champion : 1959 and 1964 (Villeneuve-sur-Lot).
  - Winner of the Lord Derby Cup : 1958 and 1964 (Villeneuve-sur-Lot).
  - Runner-up at the French Championship : 1962 and 1965 (Villeneuve-sur-Lot).
