= Roger Owen (rugby) =

Wales international rugby league footballer (1953–2021)

Personal information
- Full name: Roger Owen
- Born: 13 December 1953 Llanelli, Wales
- Died: 20 July 2021 (aged 67)

Playing information

Rugby union
- Position: Prop
Club
Years	Team	Pld	T	G	FG	P
1973–76	Llanelli RFC	24
1976–80	New Dock Stars RFC
	Total	24	0	0	0	0

Rugby league
- Position: Prop
Club
Years	Team	Pld	T	G	FG	P
1980–82	St. Helens	45	4	0	0	12
Representative
Years	Team	Pld	T	G	FG	P
1981	Wales	2	0	0	0	0

Roger Owen (13 December 1953 – 20 July 2021) was a Welsh rugby union, and professional rugby league footballer who played in the 1970s and 1980s. He played club level rugby union for Llanelli RFC and New Dock Stars RFC, as a Prop before changing codes to play rugby league at club level for St. Helens and at representative level for Wales as a prop.

Owen joined Llanelli RFC and played 24 matches before joining New Dock Stars - a junior club in Llanelli. In 1980 after turning down an offer to change codes and join Hull F.C., Owen did accept an offer to change codes and joined St Helens in August 1980, making his first team debut against Castleford on 26 October 1980. A further 44 appearances, in which he scored four tries, followed before he was placed on the transfer list in October 1982. Declining to move to Cardiff Blue Dragons, Owen retired from the game and returned to Llanelli where he worked for a tunnelling company.

During his time at St Helens, Owen played twice for the Welsh national team, making two appearances as a substitute in 1981; against France in January and against England in November.

Owen is number 947 on the St Helens heritage list and number 326 on the Wales national team heritage list.
