= Jean Darricau =

France international rugby league & union player

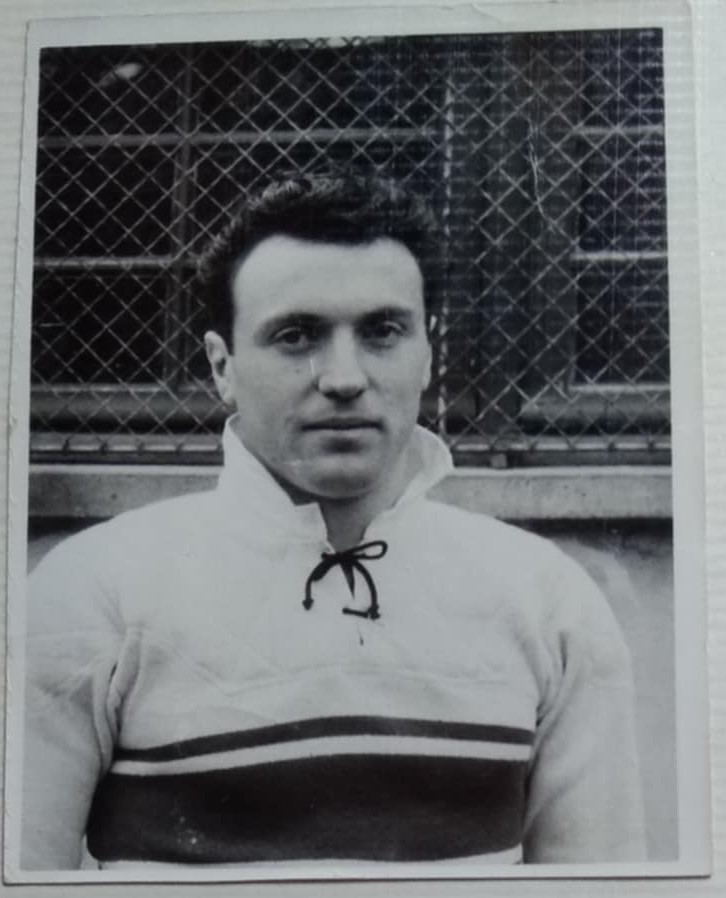

Personal information
- Born: 2 October 1931 (age 94) Hasparren, Pyrénées-Atlantiques, Nouvelle-Aquitaine, France
- Height: 5 ft 9 in (1.75 m)
- Weight: 12 st 0 lb (76 kg)

Playing information

Rugby union
Club
Years	Team	Pld	T	G	FG	P
19??–??	Dax
19??–??	SBUC
	Total	0	0	0	0	0

Rugby league
- Position: Centre, Loose forward
Club
Years	Team	Pld	T	G	FG	P
1952–55	Bordeaux
1955–56	Côte Basque
1956–??	Lyon
	Total	0	0	0	0	0
Representative
Years	Team	Pld	T	G	FG	P
	France	2	0	0	0	0
- Source: As of 14 February 2021

Jean Darricau (born 2 October 1931) is a French former rugby union and league footballer in the 1940s, 1950s and 1960s. He played as centre or lock forward.

After his debut in rugby union for US Dax with which he won the Frantz Reichel Cup in 1949 and 1950, then a stint at SBUC, he switched codes in 1952 to join rugby league and Bordeaux, with which he won the French Championship in 1954. Later, he joined the Lyon club.

Thanks to his performances, he was called up twice for the France national team in 1957 to face Great Britain, and was called up for the 1960 tour.

== Biography ==
Outside the pitch, he worked as an industrial designer.

== Honours ==
=== Rugby league ===
- Team honours :
  - French champion in : 1954 (Bordeaux).

=== Rugby union ===
- Team honours :
  - French junior champion : 1949 and 1950 (Dax).
