= André Lacaze (rugby league) =

France former international rugby league footballer

Personal information
- Full name: André Lacaze
- Born: 14 December 1930 (age 95) France
- Height: 5 ft 6 in (1.68 m)
- Weight: 10 st 7 lb (67 kg)

Playing information
- Position: Second-row, Centre
Club
Years	Team	Pld	T	G	FG	P
195?–60	Villeneuve-sur-Lot
196?–6?	Toulouse Olympique
	Total	0	0	0	0	0
Representative
Years	Team	Pld	T	G	FG	P
1957–67	France	16	0	30	2	64

Refereeing information
Years	Competition	Apps
1968–7?	French Championship
- As of 18 January 2021

André Lacaze (born 14 December 1930) is a French former rugby league footballer and referee.

== Playing career ==
=== Rugby league ===
He started his career for the Villeneuve-sur-Lot club, with which he won a Lord Derby Cup title in 1958 and a French Championship title in 1959. He later joined Toulouse, with which he played a Lord Derby Cup final in 1962.

Thanks to his club-level performance, he was called up several times for the France national team, taking part as well to the 1960 Rugby League World Cup. Outside his career, he worked as an adjuster.

=== Referee career ===
After his playing career, he became a rugby Ieague referee, notably refereeing the French Championship finals in 1968 and 1977.

== Honours ==
- Lord Derby Cup:
  - Winner in 1958 (Villeneuve-sur-Lot)
  - Runner up in 1962 (Toulouse)
- French Championship:
  - Winner in 1959 (Villeneuve-sur Lot)
