= David Despin =

France international rugby league player & coach

Personal information
- Born: 5 August 1971 (age 54) France

Playing information
- Position: Centre
Club
Years	Team	Pld	T	G	FG	P
1990–95	Villeneuve Leopards
1996	Paris Saint-Germain
1997–02	Villeneuve Leopards
	Total	0	0	0	0	0
Representative
Years	Team	Pld	T	G	FG	P
1991–00	France	18	1	0	0	4

Coaching information
Club
Years	Team	Gms	W	D	L	W%
	Villeneuve Leopards

David Despin is a French coach and former rugby league footballer who represented France at the 1995 and 2000 World Cups.

== Playing career ==
Despin played for the Villeneuve Leopards in French domestic tournaments. He first represented France in 1991. He remained part of the French squad for the rest of the decade, being selected in the 1995 and 2000 World Cup teams. In 1997 Despin was part of Frances nines squad that competed in the Rugby League World Nines tournament.

In 1996 he joined the new Paris Saint-Germain side in 1996's Super League I. After the season ended he returned to the Leopards and was part of their 2000 and 2001 Challenge Cup runs.

Despin later coached Villeneuve.
