= Gareth Owen (Welsh rugby league) =

Wales international rugby league footballer

Personal information
- Full name: Gareth Owen

Playing information
- Position: Prop
Club
Years	Team	Pld	T	G	FG	P
1971–83	Oldham	68	10	0	0	30
Representative
Years	Team	Pld	T	G	FG	P
1981	Wales	+2

Gareth Owen is a former professional rugby league footballer who played in the 1970s and 1980s. He played at representative level for Wales, and at club level for Oldham, as a prop.

== International honours ==
Gareth Owen won caps for Wales while at Oldham in 1981 against France (interchange/substitute), and England (interchange/substitute).
