= Antoine Jimenez =

Former international rugby league coach & footballer (1929–2019)

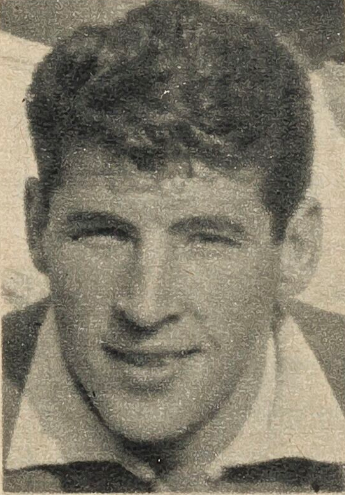

Personal information
- Born: 9 May 1929 Mauléon-Licharre, Pyrénées-Atlantiques, Nouvelle-Aquitaine, France
- Died: 19 November 2019 (aged 90) Sarlat-la-Canéda, France

Playing information
- Height: 5 ft 9 in (1.75 m)
- Weight: 11 st 13 lb (76 kg)
- Position: Centre, Stand-off
Club
Years	Team	Pld	T	G	FG	P
	Villeneuve XIII
Representative
Years	Team	Pld	T	G	FG	P
1953–60	France	33	6	0	0	18

Coaching information
Club
Years	Team	Gms	W	D	L	W%
1956–57	Villeneuve-sur-Lot
Representative
Years	Team	Gms	W	D	L	W%
1975	France	1	0	0	1	0
- Source: As of 17 January 2021

Antoine Jimenez (9 May 1929 – 19 November 2019) was a French rugby league player and coach who represented France in two Rugby League World Cups.

== Personal life ==
Outside the pitch, he was a teacher.

== Playing career ==
A great promise of rugby union under the colours of Pau, however, Jimenez chose to play rugby league for Villeneuve.

Jimenez made his debut for France against England in 1953, as part of that year's European Championship. He was part of the French squad for the 1954 and 1957 Rugby League World Cups. In 1959 he played in two test matches against the touring Australian side, captaining the side in one of the matches. His last internationals were in 1960, as part of a tour of New Zealand.

After his player career, Jimenez became the first national technical director for the French Rugby League Federation between 1960 and 1978.

== Later years ==
Jimenez coached France in one test match, against Australia on 21 June 1975 at Lang Park.
