= Frédéric Banquet =

Former France international rugby league & rugby union footballer

Personal information
- Born: 23 February 1974 (age 52) Carcassonne, France

Playing information
- Height: 187 cm (6 ft 2 in)
- Weight: 98 kg (15 st 6 lb)

Rugby league
- Position: Fullback, Wing, Centre
Club
Years	Team	Pld	T	G	FG	P
1994–95	Featherstone Rovers	20	15	17	0	94
1995–96	Sheffield Eagles		1	13	0	30
1996	Paris Saint-Germain	18	7	4	0	36
1997	Wakefield Trinity	18	16	7		74
2000–03	Villeneuve Leopards
2004–08	AS Carcassonne
	Total	56	39	41	0	234
Representative
Years	Team	Pld	T	G	FG	P
1994–03	France	21	8	33	0	98

Rugby union
Club
Years	Team	Pld	T	G	FG	P
2001–02	Castres Olympique

Frédéric "Freddie" Banquet is a French former professional rugby league and rugby union footballer who played in the 1990s and 2000s. He played representative level rugby league (RL) for France at the 1995 Rugby League World Cup and 2000 Rugby League World Cup, and at club level in France and England.

== Playing career ==
From Carcassonne, Banquet was an under-21 international for France when he joined Featherstone Rovers during the 1994–95 Rugby Football League season. Initially signed on a one-month trial this was later extended to a long-term contract.

Banquet then spent a season with the Sheffield Eagles in 1996 before returning home to join new franchise, Paris Saint-Germain for 1996's Super League I. He played in the competition's inaugural match on 29 March 1996 when Paris Saint-Germain played the Sheffield Eagles in front of 17,873 supporters at Charlety Stadium. Paris won the match 30–24 and Banquet scored the first try in the new Super League competition.

However, Banquet only spent one season with Paris Saint-Germain, joining Wakefield Trinity (Heritage No. 1086) in 1997.

Banquet later played for the Villeneuve Leopards and was part of their side the competed in the 2000 and 2001 Challenge Cups. Villeneuve released Banquet to play for rugby union club Castres Olympique in the 2001–02 season before he returned to the Leopards. Banquet later played for AS Carcassonne.

== Representative career ==
Banquet first represented France in 1994 when he was part of their 74–0 heavy defeat by the Australia touring team during the 1994 Kangaroo tour of Great Britain and France. In 1995 he played in four tests for France before being named in the teams 1995 World Cup side.

He continued to appear regularly for France throughout 1996 and 1997. In 1998 he was part of the first ever full international played in Ireland and scored, and converted, an injury-time try to give France a 24–22 victory.

He was again named in France's World Cup squad in 2000.

Banquet was part of France's June–July tour to Papua New Guinea and New Zealand in 2001. However, later in the 2001 season Banquet switched codes, joining a French rugby union club. By 2003 he had returned to rugby league and played in all three of France's matches during the 2003 European Nations Cup. He was part of the French sevens side at the 2004 World Sevens.
