= Antranick Apelian =

Former France international rugby league footballer

Antranik Apelian
Personal information
- Born: 26 December 1929 Marseille, France
- Died: 10 June 2017 (aged 87) Sarrola-Carcopino, France

Playing information
- Height: 1.77 m (5 ft 10 in)
- Weight: 86 kg (13 st 8 lb)
- Position: Hooker
Club
Years	Team	Pld	T	G	FG	P
1954–56	Battaillon de Joinville
	Marseille XIII
	Total	0	0	0	0	0
Representative
Years	Team	Pld	T	G	FG	P
1955–61	France	20	?	0	0	3
- Source: As of 17 January 2021

Antranik Apelian (26 December 1929 - 10 June 2017) was a French-Armenian rugby league footballer who played in 1950s and 1960s, as a hooker. At club level, he played for Marseille XIII for all of his career, with which he won the Lord Derby Cup in 1965 and ended second in the 1954 French Rugby League Championship final. He was surnamed "Niky". Outside the field, he worked as a firefighter in the Marseille Naval Fire Battalion. He also had a reputation of being "tough as nails".

His performances at club level brought him to the France national team between 1955 and 1961, taking part at the 1957 Rugby League World Cup. He was capped 20 times for France.

After his career as player, Apelian moved to Corsica, where he trained the clubs Ajax XIII and Appietto XIII.

== Honours ==
- French Championship
  - 1 time champion in 1954
- Lord Derby Cup
  - 1 time champion in 1965
  - 1 time runner-up in 1955

== Bibliography ==
- Passamar, André (1984). L'encyclopédie de Treize Magazine (Sud Ouest Presse impression ed.). Toulouse. ASIN B0014I5GK6.
- Bonnery, Louis (1996). Le rugby à XIII le plus français du monde. Limoux: Cano&Franck. pp. 227–245. ASIN B000X3Z932.
