= Michel Mazaré =

France international rugby league footballer and coach (b.1954)

Personal information
- Born: 14 January 1954 (age 71) Villeneuve-sur-Lot, France

Playing information
- Position: halfback, five-eighth
Club
Years	Team	Pld	T	G	FG	P
19??–81	Villeneuve-sur-Lot
Representative
Years	Team	Pld	T	G	FG	P
1972–80	France	5			1	21

Coaching information
Club
Years	Team	Gms	W	D	L	W%
1982–83	Villeneuve-sur-Lot
1985–87	Villeneuve-sur-Lot
1996	Paris Saint-Germain
	Total	0	0	0	0
Representative
Years	Team	Gms	W	D	L	W%
1991	France
- Source: As of 10 October 2023

Michel Mazaré (born 14 January 1954 in Villeneuve-sur-Lot), is a French former rugby league footballer who played as halfback and five-eighth, and later, coach.

== Career ==
At club level, he played his entire career for Villeneuve-sur-Lot winning a French Championship title in 1980, as well a Lord Derby Cup title in 1979. He also represented France After his sports career, he trained Villeneuve-sur-Lot in the 1980s, France in 1991 and Paris Saint Germain during its appearance in Super League.

== Honours ==
=== Team honours ===
- French Rugby League Championship
  - Winner in 1980 (Villeneuve-sur-Lot).
  - Runner-up in 1974 and 1981 (Villeneuve-sur-Lot).
- Lord Derby Cup
  - Champion in 1979 (Villeneuve-sur-Lot).
  - Runner-up in 1972 (Villeneuve-sur-Lot).
