= Steve Diamond (rugby league) =

Wales international rugby league footballer

Personal information
- Born: 7 July 1953 (age 73) Hereford, England

Playing information
- Height: 5 ft 10 in (1.78 m)
- Weight: 12 st 6 lb (79 kg)

Rugby union
- Position: Flyhalf
Club
Years	Team	Pld	T	G	FG	P
1976–77	Newport RFC	4	1	0	0	4

Rugby league
- Position: Fullback, Centre
Club
Years	Team	Pld	T	G	FG	P
1978–81	Wakefield Trinity	122	20	232	2	526
1981–84	Fulham RLFC	109	24	305	4	691
1984–85	Warrington	4+1	0	5	1	11
1985	Hunslet	10	0	20	2	42
1985–86	Castleford	13+3	1	6	1	17
1986–87	York	2	0	3	0	6
	Total	264	45	571	10	1293
Representative
Years	Team	Pld	T	G	FG	P
1979–81	Wales	3	0	2	0	6

Steve Diamond (born 7 July 1953) is an English-born former rugby union and professional rugby league footballer who played in the 1970s and 1980s. He played club level rugby union for Newport RFC, as a fly-half, and rugby league for Wales, and at club level for Wakefield Trinity, Fulham RLFC, Warrington, Hunslet, Castleford and York, as a goal-kicking fullback or centre.

== Background ==
Steve Diamond was born in Hereford, Herefordshire, England, and he worked at British Jeffrey Diamond (BJD) in Wakefield, West Yorkshire, England.

== Playing career ==
=== International honours ===
Diamond won caps for Wales while at Wakefield Trinity in 1980 against France and England, and in 1981 against France.

=== Challenge Cup Final appearances ===
Steve Diamond played at centre in Wakefield Trinity's 3–12 defeat by Widnes in the 1978–79 Challenge Cup Final during the 1978–79 season at Wembley Stadium, London on Saturday 5 May 1979, in front of a crowd of a crowd of 94,218.

=== County Cup Final appearances ===
Steve Diamond played stand-off, and scored a goal in Castleford's 18–22 defeat by Hull Kingston Rovers in the 1985–86 Yorkshire Cup Final during the 1985–86 season at Elland Road, Leeds on Sunday 27 October 1985.

=== Club career ===
During his time at Wakefield Trinity he scored nineteen 3-point tries and, one 4-point try.

== Career Records ==
Steve Diamond holds Fulham RLFC/London Crusaders/London Broncos/Harlequins RL's career goalscoring record; with 309-goals scored between 1981 and 1984, and is one of less than twenty-five Welshmen to have scored more than 1000-points in their rugby league career.
