= Donald Parry (rugby league) =

Don Parry
Personal information
- Full name: Donald Parry
- Born: unknown

Playing information
- Position: Hooker
Club
Years	Team	Pld	T	G	FG	P
	Huyton
	Widnes
1978–84	Blackpool Borough	141	7	0	11	33
	Total	141	7	0	11	33
Representative
Years	Team	Pld	T	G	FG	P
1980–82	Wales	6	1	0	0	3

Donald Parry (birth unknown) is a former professional rugby league footballer who played in the 1980s. He played at representative level for Wales, and at club level for Huyton, Widnes and Blackpool Borough, as a hooker.

== International honours ==
Don Parry won caps for Wales while at Blackpool Borough in 1980 against France, and England, in 1981 against France, and England (2 matches), and in 1982 against Australia.
