= Jean-Pierre Clar =

France international rugby league and union player (1942–2026)

Jean Pierre Clar
Personal information
- Born: 27 February 1942 Hanoi, Tonkin, French Indochina
- Died: 5 September 2026 (aged 84)

Playing information

Rugby league
- Position: Hooker, Loose forward
Club
Years	Team	Pld	T	G	FG	P
1959–62	US Villeneuve XIII
1965–72	US Villeneuve XIII
	Total	0	0	0	0	0
Representative
Years	Team	Pld	T	G	FG	P
1965–70	France	27	1	0	0	3

Rugby union
- Position: Flanker
Club
Years	Team	Pld	T	G	FG	P
1962–65	SU Agen
- Source: As of 31 October 2017

Jean Pierre Clar (27 February 1942 – 5 September 2026), also known by the nicknames "Jap," "Nam," "Le chinois" ("The Chinese"), and "Tronche d'obus" ("Howitzer head"), was a French professional rugby league and amateur rugby union footballer who played in the 1950s, 1960s and 1970s. He played representative level rugby league (RL) for France in the 1968 Rugby League World Cup and 1970 Rugby League World Cup, and at club level for US Villeneuve XIII (two spells) as a hooker or loose forward. Clar played as a flanker in the club-level rugby union (RU) for SU Agen.

== Biography ==
Jean-Pierre Clar was born in Hanoi, French Indochina on 27 February 1942, to a French father and a Vietnamese mother.

As a player, he is considered not very heavy nor very fast but has "a style at any speed of execution as he was technical to the point".

He debuted in rugby league for Villeneuve XIII alongside his brother Christian before returning there after his rugby union period. He played three seasons for SU Agen, winning a French Championship title in 1962. With Villeneuve, he won the French Championship in 1964. Called up for the France national team, he earned 34 caps between 1965 and '72.

One of his notable feats was on 6 March 1967, during a match against the Great Britain national team in Wigan. In this match, he exemplified himself by his pugnacity and his resistance to bad gestures from opposing players (notably, from Bill Bryant) which would earn him the applause of the British public at the end of the match.

Outside the field, he was a company manager, after working as a "locksmith welder".

Clar died on 5 September 2026, at the age of 84.
