= Villeneuve XIII RLLG =

French semi-professional rugby league club

Villeneuve XIII

Club information
- Full name: Villeneuve XIII
- Nickname: Leopards
- Colours: Green and White
- Founded: 1934; 92 years ago
- Website: https://www.villeneuve13.com/

Current details
- Ground: Stade Max Rousie (5,000)
- Coach: Constant Villegas
- Competition: Super XIII
- 2024–25: 6th

Uniforms
Home colours

Villeneuve XIII originally called Sports Athletic Villeneuvois XIII are a semi-professional rugby league team based in Villeneuve-sur-Lot in the region of Nouvelle-Aquitaine in south-western France. Formed in 1934, the first French rugby league club, they currently play in the Super XIII the highest level of rugby league in France. They have won both the league title and the cup on nine occasions. Their home stadium is the Stade Max Rousie.

== History ==
Sports Athletic Villeneuvois XIII were founded during the last two weeks of May 1934 by French rugby league pioneer Jean Galia who went on to be the club's first coach/captain and backed by the mayor. Villeneuve quickly went on to become a rugby league stronghold. The new club picked up some players from the local rugby club CA Villeneuve including Ernest Camo, Jean Barres, Jean Rabot and Max Rousie and others from Perpignan like Aimé Bardes, Martin Serre, Jean Daffis and François Noguères in readiness for the first French rugby league championship. SA Villeneuve were the first club to become a member of the Ligue Française de Rugby à 13 (LFR.13) on 2 June 1934. Villeneuve remain as the oldest rugby league club in France, they became the first French club side to tour England in September 1934. On that tour they played against Warrington, Broughton Rangers, Hull FC, Yorkshire XIII, Oldham, and Leeds. Max Rousie starred for the tourists scoring 76 of their 117 points. The club then hosted both a touring Yorkshire XIII and then Salford RLFC.

Villeneuve began the inaugural French Rugby League Championship in 1934 by beating XIII Catalan 48-25 at the Pont-de-Marot they would go on and win the first championship by finishing top of the table. At the end of the season they took on the English rugby league champions Swinton in the 1935 Match of Champions, going down 25-27 in front of a crowd of 15,000. Having lost the 1936 Lord Derby Cup Final they made amends in 1937 by defeating XIII Catalan 12-6. At the outbreak of war and the German invasion of France, Rugby League under the Vichy Government was banned. Villeneuve were forced to play rugby union under a new club name Union Sportive Villeneuve XV. Towards the end of the Second World War rugby league was re-established and rugby league returned to Villeneuve under a new name Union Sportive Villeneuve XIII. The reborn club met AS Carcassonne at the Parc des Princes in Paris on 4 February 1945 in an exhibition match, the first rugby league game played in France after the war.

Villeneuve became national champions again in 1959, 1964 and twice more in the early 1980s. They also lifted the Lord Derby Cup in 1958, 1964, 1979 and 1984. In 1998 the club added the nickname "Les léopards d'Aquitaine", The Leopards of Aquitaine. Also in this year rugby union's bad treatment of rugby league reared its ugly head again. Villeneuve were preparing for an evening match to be screened live on national television at SU Agen Rugby Club when the union authorities refused to let Agen host the game thus the game had to be cancelled.

Villeneuve experienced a glorious era from 1996 to 2003, appearing in every league championship Grand Final bar one. They won five championships in eight years culminating in their 31-18 victory over St. Gaudens in 2003. Villeneuve played in four Lord Derby Cup finals in this period and won every one. In seasons 1999, 2002 and 2003 they completed the league and cup double. The 1999 double winning team was inspired by former Australian captain Paul Sironen. The 2002 and 2003 double seasons were done under the coaching of Jean Luc Albert. At this time the club was the strongest in the league and could call upon some of the best French internationals in Laurent Carrasco, Laurent Frayssinous, Vincent Wulf, Romain Sort, David Despin and Frederic Banquet as well as experienced oversea stars like Paul Sironen and former New Zealand captain Quentin Pongia During this period they also became the first French club to reach the quarter-finals of the prestigious Rugby League Challenge Cup in 2001. After beating Simms Cross ARLFC, York Wasps and Rochdale Hornets they eventually went out to Super League side Warrington Wolves. They were also crowned European champions in 1998 when they lifted the Treize Tournoi beating Lancashire Lynx in the final.

In 2005 the club went bankrupt but a new club was quickly formed named Villeneuve XIII Rugby League and thus retaining their place in the top flight. The Léopards made history in 2005 when they signed the Russian international halfback, Ouchillikos Novel. He was signed after an impressive performance in the defeat to France in the 2005 European Nations Cup. In 2015 the club faced closure again but after starting a 'Help save Villeneuve XIII' supporters around the world and business's made donations and saved the club from extinction. For the following season the club adopted its new name Villeneuve XIII RLLG

The club continues to run successful academy sides, begun in the 1930s, and now runs both ladies and girls teams.

== Challenge Cup ==
As one of the more dominant sides in the French competition, when the RFL in England began inviting overseas teams to compete in the Challenge Cup Villeneuve were one of the first clubs to enter. In 2000 they arrived with a bang when they won 16-14 at Keighley Cougars before going on to lose to Dewsbury Rams. The following season they eclipsed this when they reached the quarter-finals, becoming the first overseas team to do so. After despatching amateurs Simms Cross they then accounted for York Wasps and Rochdale Hornets before bowing out to Warrington Wolves 0-32. The next campaign saw them once again beat York Wasps before losing to Doncaster. Their last outing came the following season where they went out at the first attempt away at Featherstone Rovers to a last minute try.

=== 2000 ===
- All away games *
- 13 February v Keighley Cougars 16-14
- 27 February v Dewsbury Rams 10-35

=== 2001 ===
- 26 January v Simms Cross ARLFC 42-10
- 11 February v York Wasps 22-8
- 25 February v Rochdale Hornets 26-19
- 11 March v Warrington Wolves 0-32

=== 2002 ===
- 10 February v York Wasps 17-8
- 24 February v Doncaster RLFC 16-24

=== 2003 ===
- ? January v Featherstone Rovers 22-26

== Villeneuve v Australia ==
Date	Score	Attendance
29 January 1938	3-26	18,000
21 December 1952	11-18	2,262
24 December 1959	5-11	1,458

== Colours and Badge ==
The club have always played in green and white. The nickname Leopards was adopted in 1998

== Stadium ==
From 1900 to 1955 the rugby club played at Pont-de-Marot. In 1955 their current stadium was built originally called Myre Mory Stadium named after a soldier killed in 1940 and located on the left bank of the river Lot near the Lycee Georges Leygues. In 2011 the stadium renamed Stade Max Rousie after the famous former France and Villeneuve rugby league footballer. A multi sports venue that hosts along with rugby league, football, athletics and tennis. The ground has floodlights as well as two training pitches. The current capacity is 5,000 with 1.434 seats.

== Current squad ==
Squad for the 2026-2027 Super XIII season.

- (France) Hamza Bachoukh (Five-eighth)
- (France) Elias Barbe (Prop)
- (France) Anthony Barjou (Hooker)
- (France) Ilyes Ben Chedd (Prop)
- (France) Nolan Bouche (Wing)
- (France) Enzo Deltheil (Lock)
- (France) Baptiste Dubertrand (Second-row)
- (France) Anouar El Azizi (Hooker)
- (Australia) Callum Ellis (Prop)
- (France) Davy Escoder (Second-row)
- (France) Nesta Fleury (Prop)
- (Australia) Zac Greene (Halfback)
- (France) Sacha Kouassi (Second-row)
- (France) Quentin Malbec (Second-row)
- (France) Yllan Mongay (Wing)
- (France) Ilyan Moualkia (Prop)
- (France) Guillaume Poulain (Centre)
- (France) Romain Rieucaud (Centre)
- (France) Gabriel Riguet (Wing)
- (France) Nathan Rouillard (Wing)
- (France) Raphael Savar (Hooker)
- (France) Lucas Vergniol (Second-row)
- (France) Gaetan Vick (Wing)
- (France) Jo Wambergue (Prop)

== Honours ==
- Elite One Championship (9): 1934-35, 1958–59, 1963–64, 1979–80, 1995–96, 1998–99, 2000–01, 2001–02, 2002–03
- Lord Derby Cup (9): 1937, 1958, 1964, 1979, 1984, 1999, 2000, 2002, 2003
- Treize Tournoi (1): 1998
- Junior League Trophy (12): 1936-37, 1937–38, 1938–39, 1939–40, 1945–46, 1959–60, 1979–80, 1988–89, 1989–90, 1998–99, 1999-2000, 2000–01
- Junior Cup Trophy (6): 1960, 1961, 1977, 1978, 1989, 1990

== International players ==
=== French or assimilated ===
==== SA Villeneuve XIII ====
- Sylvain Bes
- André Brinsolles
- Maurice Brunetaud

- Baptiste Carbo
- Etienne Cougnenc
- Jean Daffis

- Henri Marcel Delhommeau
- Henri Durand
- Jean Galia

- Marius Guiral
- Maurice Porra
- Max Rousié

- Henri Sanz

==== US Villeneuve XIII ====
- Guy Augey
- Bertrand Ballouhey
- Frédéric Banquet
- Paul Bartoletti
- Angélo Boldini
- Régis Brioux
- Maurice Brunetaud
- Gaston Calixte
- Laurent Carrasco
- André Carrère
- Max Chantal
- Christian Clar
- Jean-Pierre Clar

- David Collado
- Gilles Cornut
- Etienne Courtine
- Gérard Crémoux
- David Despin
- Fabien Devecchi
- Jacques Dubon
- Pascal Eito
- Roger Estrada
- Jamal Fakir
- Jean Foussat
- Laurent Fraysssinous
- Romain Gagliazzo

- Roger Garnung
- Antoine Geronazzo
- Gabriel Genoud
- Antoine Gonzalez
- Jacques Gruppi
- Raymond Gruppi
- Didier Hermet
- Jérôme Hermet
- Antoine Jimenez
- André Lacaze
- Pascal Laroche
- Michel Laville
- Odé Lespes

- Christian Maccali
- Jean-Pierre Magagnin
- Robert Majorel
- Alain Maury
- Michel Mazaré
- Jacques Merquey
- Jean Panno
- Daniel Pellerin
- Bertrand Planté
- Jean Planté
- Julien Rinaldi
- Joël Roosebrouck
- Christian Sabatié

- Pierre Sabatié
- Artie Shead
- Romain Sort
- Ernest Tarozzi
- Yves Treilhes
- Mickaël Van Snick
- Daniel Verdès
- Patrick Wozniack
- Vincent Wulf
- Charles Zalduendo

==== Villeneuve XIII RL ====
- Laurent Carrasco
- Olivier Charles
- Jérôme Hermet
- Ernest Camo
- Serge Cuyas
- Léo Murari
- Ovide Nogaro
- Fernand Vigouroux

=== Foreigners ===
- USV.13 :
  - Mark Bourneville (New Zealand)
  - Paul Sironen (Australia)
  - Shaun Austerfield (England)
  - Grant Doorey (Australia)
  - Dragan Durdevic (Australia);
  - Jason Webber (Australia);
  - Brock Mueller (Australia);
  - Chad Dillinger (Australia);
  - Quentin Pongia (New Zealand);
  - Artie Shead (New Zealand);
  - Phillip Shead (New Zealand);
  - Tim Ryan (Australia);
  - Steven Plath (Australia);

=== Note ===
Maurice Brunetaud and Henri Durand are members of the very small group of French rugby players who were Internationals before and after WWII and Rugby League's banishment by Vichy (Oct. 1940 to Sept.1944).

== Coaches ==
- 1934-36: Jean Galia,
- 1937-40: R. Griffoul,
- 1940-45: J. Barrés, J. Daffis;
- 1946-50: R. Manieu,
- 1950-53: B. Carbo,
- 1956-57: Antoine Jimenez,
- 1957-58: R. Estrada,
- 1958-62: R. Manieu,
- 1962-66: Jep Lacoste,
- 1967-68: R. Manieu,
- 1968-70: O. Nogaro,
- 1970-72: M. Monclus,

- 1973-76: Jep Lacoste,
- 1976-78: E. Courtine, O. Nogaro, Jean-Pierre Clar
- 1978-82: Raymond Gruppi,
- 1982-84: B. Ballouhey, J. Balleroy,
- 1985-86: Jacques Gruppi,
- 1988-89: Michel Mazaré,
- 1988-90: S. Cuyas, M. Wakefield
- 1990-91: M. Wakefield,
- 1991-92: M. Wakefield-A. Lopès,
- 1992-94: A. Lopès,
- 1994-95: K. Taylor, JP. Goguet,
- 1995-98: D. Ellis,
- 1998-00: G. Doorey, David Despin,
- 2001-03: JL. Albert,
- 2003-04: Brad Davis, John Ackland, David Despin,
- 2004-05: David Despin, B. Planté,
- 2005-06: B. Planté-P. Hollovoet,
- 2006-07: P. Hollovoet & Vincent Wulf,
- ????-21: Fabien Devecchi
- 2021 : Eddy Pettybourne
- 2021- : Olivier Janzac

== Presidents ==
- 1934-37: G. Bordeneuve,
- 1937-41: Dr L. Vinson,
- 1941-45: G. Prady (USV.XV),
- 1945-53: Drs L. Vinson et P. Mourgues,
- 1953-61: Me J. Maury,
- 1961-62: R. Bagilet, J. Bouyssonnie,
- 1962-65: A. Escande,
- 1965-73: G. Marès,
- 1973-74: E. Benguigui,
- 1974-78: Dr F. Derieux,
- 1978-88: Dr F. Mourgues,
- 1988-89: J. Dachary,
- 1989-90: P. Conduché, C. Succarat, C. Amadieu,
- 1990-92: M. Benet,

- 1992-93: C. Gabrielli,
- 1993-94: Dr M. Dupuet,
- 1994-99: E. Courtine, G. Troupel,
- 1999-00: G. Troupel, P. Soubiran,
- 2000-03: P. Soubiran,
- 2003-04: Mme J. Lombard,
- 2004-05: Dr M. Pierre,
- 2005-06: Dr M. Pierre, F. Didier, J. Balleroy
- 2006-07: F. Didier, JM. Barjour

== Famous players, coaches, presidents ==
- (France) Jean Luc Albert (coach)
- (France) Frédéric Banquet
- (France) Paul Bartoletti
- (France) Angelo Boldini
- (France) G. Bordeneuve (president)
- (France) Maurice Brunetaud
- (France) Gaston Calixte
- (France) Laurent Carrasco
- (France) André Carrère
- (France) Max Chantal
- (France) Jean-Pierre Clar
- (France) Etienne Courtine (player & president)
- (France) Serge Cuyas
- (France) David Despin
- (France) Jacques Dubon
- (France) Henri Durand
- (France) Pascal Eito
- (England) David Ellis (coach)

- (France) Roger Estrada
- (France) Jamal Fakir
- (France) Laurent Frayssinous
- (France) Jean Galia (player & coach)
- (France) Roger Garnung
- (France) Antoine Gonzalez
- (France) Jacques Gruppi & Raymond Gruppi
- (France) Marius Guiral
- (France) Didier Hermet
- (France) Antoine Jimenez
- (France) André Lacaze
- (France) Jep Lacoste (coach)
- (France) Christian Maccali
- (France) Raoul Manieu (coach)
- (France) G. Marès (president)
- (France) Me J. Maury (president)
- (France) Michel Mazaré
- (France) Jacques Merquey

- (France) Dr P. Mourgues (president)
- (France) Dr F. Mourgues (president)
- (France) Léo Murari
- (France) Ovide Nogaro
- (France) Jean Pano
- (France) Daniel Pélerin
- (France) Maurice Porra
- (France) Julien Rinaldi
- (France) Joël Roosebrouck
- (France) Max Rousié
- (France) Christian Sabatié
- (Australia) Paul Sironen
- (France) P. Soubiran (president)
- (France) Ernest Tarozzi
- (France) G. Troupel (president)
- (France) Daniel Verdes
- (France) Dr L. Vinson (president)
- (France) Vincent Wulf
