= French Rugby League Championship =

Rugby league tournament

- Sport: Rugby league
- Founded: 1934
- Folded: 2002
- Replaced by: Elite 1 and Elite 2
- No. of teams: 20
- Country: France
- Most titles: XIII Catalan (11 titles)

The French rugby league championship (French: Le Championnat de France de Rugby à XIII) was the top tier of the French rugby league system from its inception in 1934 until 2002 when the league was split into two divisions; the Elite One Championship and Elite Two Championship.

In all seasons except for the first, a play-off structure leading to a championship final has been used to determine the fate of the championship.

== List of Grand Finals ==
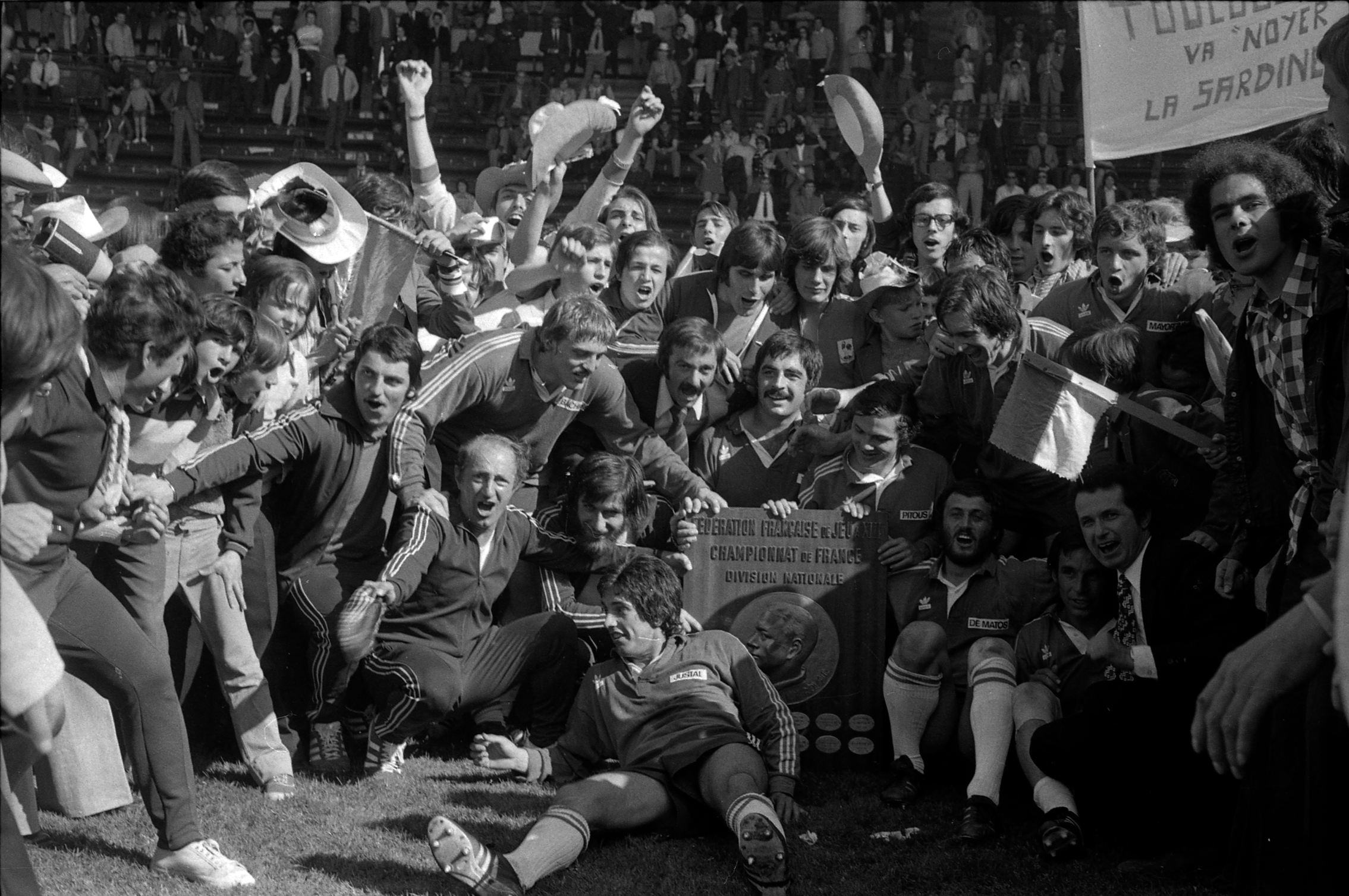
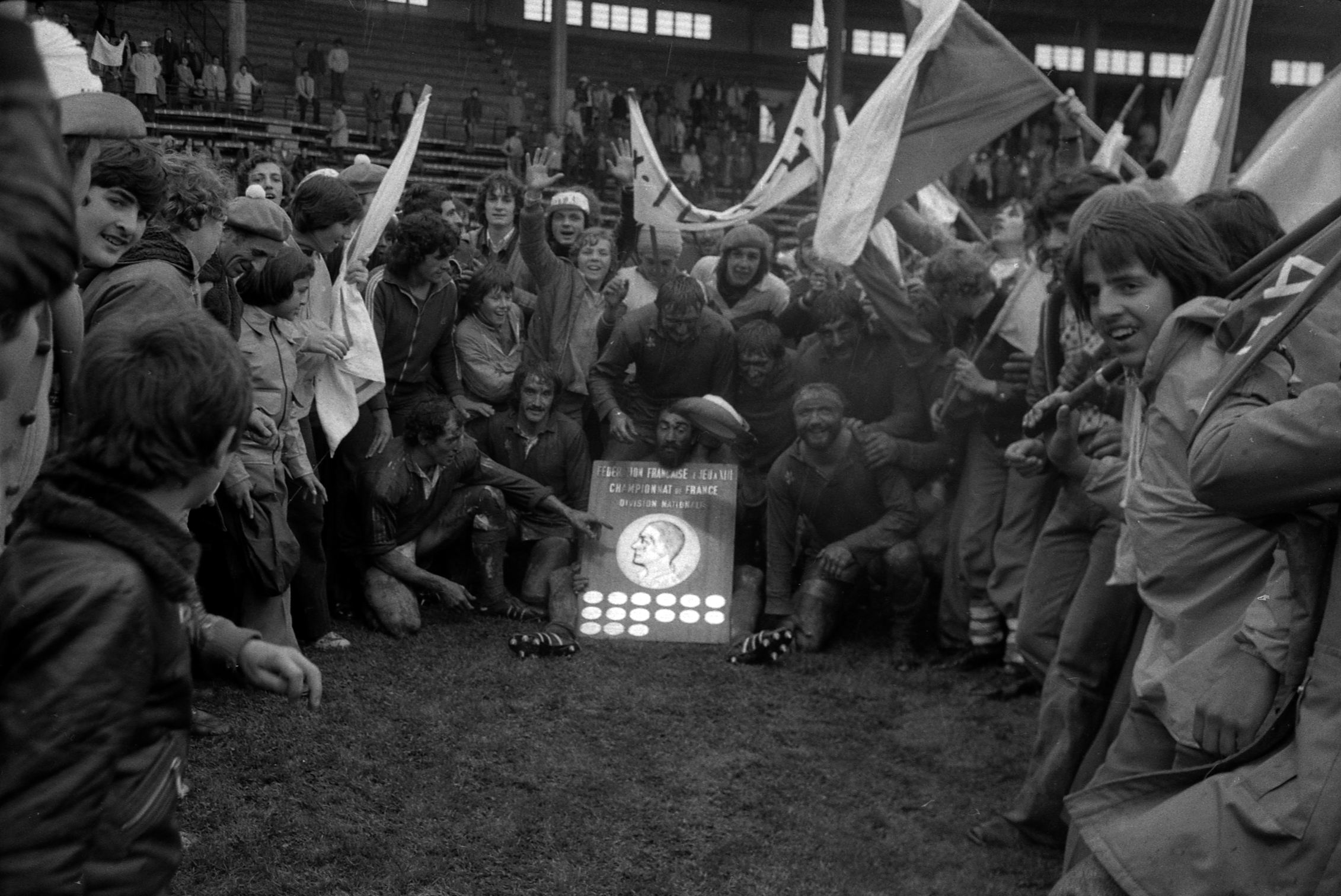
Toulouse Olympique celebrating victory in 1973 and 1975

Season	Winners	Score	Runner-up	Venue	Attendance
1934–35	Villeneuve ^{1}	No final played, champion was first placed team in regular season			
1935–36	Catalan	25–14	Bordeaux XIII	Parc de Suzon, Bordeaux	14,150
1936–37	Bordeaux XIII	23–10	Catalan	Parc de Suzon, Bordeaux	14,300
1937–38	Albi	8–5	Villeneuve	Parc de Suzon, Bordeaux	14,880
1938–39	Roanne	9–0	Villeneuve	Stade Velodrome de Lescure, Bordeaux	19,788
1939–40	Catalan	20–16	Pau XIII	Stade des Minimes, Toulouse	10,000
1940–44: Rugby league outlawed by Vichy regime
1944–45	Carcassonne	13–12	Toulouse	Stade Jean Laffon, Perpignan	
1945–46	Carcassonne	12–0	Toulouse	Stade de Gerland, Lyon	
1946–47	Roanne	19–0	Carcassonne	Stade de Gerland, Lyon	15,000
1947–48	Roanne	3–2	Carcassonne	Marseille	20,000
1948–49	Marseille	12–5	Carcassonne	Stade Albert Domec, Carcassonne	23,500
1949–50	Carcassonne	21–7	Marseille	Perpignan	18,000
1950–51	Lyon	15–10	Catalan	Stade Chapou, Toulouse	21,933
1951–52	Carcassonne	18–6	Marseille	Stade Chapou, Toulouse	16,645
1952–53	Carcassonne	19–12	Lyon	Stade Chapou, Toulouse	22,000
1953–54	Bordeaux XIII	7–4	Marseille	Stade Chapou, Toulouse	8,000
1954–55	Lyon	7–6	Carcassonne	Stade Chapou, Toulouse	12,000
1955–56	Albi	13–5	Carcassonne	Stade Chapou, Toulouse	15,850
1956–57	Catalan	14–9	Avignon	Stade Chapou, Toulouse	9,000
1957–58	Albi	8–6	Carcassonne	Stade Chapou, Toulouse	16,163
1958–59	Villeneuve	24–16	Lézignan	Stade Chapou, Toulouse	13,000
1959–60	Roanne	31–24	Albi	Stade Chapou, Toulouse	13,800
1960–61	Lézignan	7–4	Roanne	Stade Chapou, Toulouse	6,998
1961–62	Albi	14–7	Villeneuve	Stade Chapou, Toulouse	12,068
1962–63	Lézignan	20–13	St Gaudens	Stade Chapou, Toulouse	12,200
1963–64	Villeneuve	4–3	Toulouse	Stade Chapou, Toulouse	5,166
1964–65	Toulouse	47–15	Villeneuve	Stade Chapou, Toulouse	8,837
1965–66	Carcassonne	45–20	St Gaudens	Stade Chapou, Toulouse	11,244
1966–67	Carcassonne	39–15	St Gaudens	Stade Chapou, Toulouse	10,779
1967–68	Limoux	13–12	Carcassonne	Stade Chapou, Toulouse	14,432
1968–69	Catalan	12–11	St Gaudens	Stade Chapou, Toulouse	8,326
1969–70	St Gaudens	32–10	Catalan	Stade Chapou, Toulouse	21,300
1970–71	St Estève	13–4	St Gaudens	Stade Chapou, Toulouse	8,179
1971–72	Carcassonne	21–9	St Gaudens	Stade Chapou, Toulouse	11,566
1972–73	Toulouse	18–0	Marseille	Stade Chapou, Toulouse	13,827
1973–74	St Gaudens	21–8	Villeneuve	Stade Chapou, Toulouse	5,696
1974–75	Toulouse	10–9	St Estève	Stade Chapou, Toulouse	5,015
1975–76	Carcassonne	14–6	Lézignan	Stade Chapou, Toulouse	14,000
1976–77	Albi	19–10	Carcassonne	Stadium Municipal d'Albi, Albi	18,325
1977–78	Lézignan	3–0	Catalan	Toulouse	10,358
1978–79	Catalan	17–2	Carcassonne	Toulouse	13,202
1979–80	Villeneuve	12–7	St Estève	Toulouse	10,029
1980–81 Villeneuve v Catalan abandoned after six minutes due to fighting; no championship awarded.
1981–82	Catalan	21–8	St Estève	Toulouse	8,504
1982–83	Catalan	10–8	Villeneuve	Toulouse	10,628
1983–84	Catalan	30–6	Villeneuve	Toulouse	8,182
1984–85	Catalan	26–6	Le Pontet XIII	Toulouse	8,797
1985–86	Le Pontet XIII	19–6	Catalan	Toulouse	8,000
1986–87	Catalan	11–3	Le Pontet XIII	Toulouse	4,350
1987–88	Le Pontet XIII	14–2	Catalan	Toulouse	9,950
1988–89	St Estève	23–4	Le Pontet XIII	Parc des Sports Et de l'Amitie, Narbonne	9,936
1989–90	St Estève	24–23	Carcassonne	Parc des Sports Et de l'Amitie, Narbonne	8,000
1990–91	St Gaudens	10–8	Villeneuve	Toulouse	6,031
1991–92	Carcassonne	11–10	St Estève	Toulouse	6,000
1992–93	St Estève	9–8	Catalan	Toulouse	10,000
1993–93	Catalan	6–4	Pia	Stade des Sports Et de l'Amitie, Narbonne	12,000
1994–95	Pia	12–10	St Estève	Stade des Sports Et de l'Amitie, Narbonne	13,200
1995–96	Villeneuve	27–26	St Estève	Stade des Sports Et de l'Amitie, Narbonne	10,000
1996–97	St Estève	28–24	Villeneuve	Stade des Sports Et de l'Amitie, Narbonne	12,000
1997–98	St Estève	15–8	Villeneuve	Stade des Sports Et de l'Amitie, Narbonne	12,000
1998–99	Villeneuve	33–20	St Gaudens	Paris	7,592
1999–00	Toulouse	20–18	St Estève	Paris	6,500
2000–01	Villeneuve	32–20	Toulouse	Stade des Sept-Deniers, Toulouse	8,000
2001–02	Villeneuve	17–0	Union Treiziste Catalane	Stade de la Mediterranee, Béziers	8,000
From the 2002–03 season, the French Rugby League Championship split into two divisions: Elite One Championship and Elite Two Championship.

== Champions by club ==
	Club	Wins	Runners up	Winning years
1	XIII Catalan	11	7	1935–36, 1939–40, 1956–57, 1968–69, 1978–79, 1981–82, 1982–83, 1983–84, 1984–85, 1986–87, 1993–94
2	AS Carcassonne	10	10	1944–45, 1945–46, 1949–50, 1951–52, 1952–53, 1965–66, 1966–67, 1971–72, 1975–76, 1991–92
3	Villeneuve Leopards	8	10	1934–35, 1958–59, 1963–64, 1979–80, 1995–96, 1998–99, 2000–01, 2001–02
4	AS Saint Estève	6	7	1970–71, 1988–89, 1989–90, 1992–93, 1996–97, 1997–98
5	RC Albi	5	1	1937–38, 1955–56, 1957–58, 1961–62, 1976–77
6	Toulouse Olympique	4	4	1964–65, 1972–73, 1974–75, 1999–2000
7	RC Roanne XIII	4	1	1938–39, 1946–47, 1947–48, 1959–60
8	St Gaudens	3	7	1969–70, 1973–74, 1990–91
9	Lézignan Sangliers	3	2	1960–61, 1962–63, 1977–78
10	Le Pontet XIII	2	3	1985–86, 1987–88
11=	Bordeaux XIII	2	1	1936–37, 1953–54
11=	Lyon Villeurbanne XIII	2	1	1950–51, 1954–55
13	Marseille XIII	1	4	1948–49
14	Pia XIII	1	1	1994–95
15	Limoux Grizzlies	1	0	1967–68
16=	SO Avignon	0	1	
16=	Union Treiziste Catalane	0	1	

=== Footnotes ===
1. Won title on points: no play-off was used
2. Match abandoned after six minutes after the beginning due to fighting; no championship awarded.

== Books ==
- Le Rugby à XIII le plus français du monde −1934 to 1996– by Louis Bonnery,
- The Forbidden game by Mike Rylance.

== See also ==
- Rugby league in France
- National Division 1
- National Division 2
- Lord Derby Cup
- Coupe Falcou
