= 1960 Rugby League World Cup squads =

Four teams that took part at the 1960 Rugby League World Cup.

The Rugby League News listed the squads of the four teams in its October 1960 issue, published after the first round of matches.

== Australia ==
Keith Barnes led the team as captain/coach. The team was co-managed by Pat Duggan (Ipswich, Qld) and John O'Toole (Bathurst, NSW).
Beattie, Boden, Kelly, Morgan, Muir, Parcell and Rasmussen were selected from Queensland clubs. Hambly was from a club in the New South Wales Country area. The balance of the squad had played for Sydney based clubs during the 1960 season.

| Player | Position | Age | Weight st.lb (kg) | Club | Games | Tries | Goals | FG | Points |
|---|---|---|---|---|---|---|---|---|---|
| Keith Barnes | Fullback | 25 | 11.10 (74) | Balmain | 2 | 0 | 0 | 0 | 0 |
| Dud Beattie | Prop | 26 | 14.8 (93) | Ipswich Railways | 3 | 0 | 0 | 0 | 0 |
| Ron Boden | Centre | 23 | 12.6 (79) | Toowoomba Valleys | 1 | 0 | 0 | 0 | 0 |
| Tony Brown | Five-eighth | 24 | 12.0 (76) | Newtown | 3 | 0 | 0 | 0 | 0 |
| Brian Carlson | Utility Back | 27 | 13.9 (87) | North Sydney | 3 | 4 | 5 | 0 | 22 |
| Reg Gasnier | Centre | 21 | 12.10 (81) | St George | 3 | 2 | 0 | 0 | 6 |
| Brian Hambly | Prop | 22 | 14.6 (92) | Wagga Magpies | 3 | 0 | 0 | 0 | 0 |
| Ken Irvine | Wing | 20 | 12.4 (78) | North Sydney | 2 | 0 | 0 | 0 | 0 |
| Noel Kelly | Prop | 24 | 14.0 (89) | Ayr | 3 | 1 | 0 | 0 | 3 |
| Lionel Morgan | Wing | 22 | 11.7 (73) | Wynnum-Manly | 1 | 0 | 0 | 0 | 0 |
| Rex Mossop | Prop, Second-row | 32 | 14.10 (93) | Manly-Warringah | 3 | 0 | 0 | 0 | 0 |
| Barry Muir | Halfback | 23 | 10.11 (68) | Brisbane Western Suburbs | 3 | 0 | 0 | 0 | 0 |
| Gary Parcell | Prop | 27 | 14.6 (92) | Ipswich Brothers | 2 | 0 | 0 | 0 | 0 |
| Johnny Raper | Lock | 21 | 13.8 (86) | St George | 2 | 1 | 0 | 0 | 3 |
| Elton Rasmussen | Second-row | 24 | 15.4 (97) | Toowoomba All Whites | 2 | 0 | 0 | 0 | 0 |
| Harry Wells | Centre | 28 | 14.6 (92) | Western Suburbs | 3 | 1 | 0 | 0 | 3 |

The following players were members of the touring squad, but did not play in World Cup matches.

| Player | Position | Age | Weight st.lb (kg) | Club |
|---|---|---|---|---|
| Bob Bugden | Halfback | 24 | 11.8 (73) | St George |
| Billy Rayner | Hooker | 25 | 13.7 (86) | Parramatta |

=== Post-Cup Tour Matches ===
After the Cup concluded, five Australians — Boden, Muir, Hambly, Beattie and Rayner — played for The Rest in a match against Great Britain at Odsal Stadium, Bradford on October 10, 1960.
Australia then played two matches, against English club St Helens at St. Helen's on October 12, and against a French 13 at Toulouse, on October 16.
The Rugby League Newspublished the number appearances, tries, goals and points of the Australian players in the January 1961 issue.

Tour statistics for Australian players:

| Player | Position | Age | Weight st.lb (kg) | Club | Cup Games | Tour Games | Tries | Goals | FG | Points |
|---|---|---|---|---|---|---|---|---|---|---|
| Keith Barnes | Fullback | 25 | 11.10 (74) | Balmain | 2 | 3 | 0 | 3 | 0 | 6 |
| Dud Beattie | Prop | 26 | 14.8 (93) | Ipswich Railways | 3 | 6 | 0 | 0 | 0 | 0 |
| Ron Boden | Centre | 23 | 12.6 (79) | Toowoomba Valleys | 1 | 4 | 1 | 0 | 0 | 3 |
| Andrew Brown | Five-eighth | 24 | 12.0 (76) | Newtown | 3 | 5 | 1 | 0 | 0 | 3 |
| Brian Carlson | Utility Back | 27 | 13.9 (87) | North Sydney | 3 | 4 | 4 | 10 | 0 | 32 |
| Reg Gasnier | Centre | 21 | 12.10 (81) | St George | 3 | 4 | 2 | 0 | 0 | 6 |
| Brian Hambly | Prop | 22 | 14.6 (92) | Wagga Magpies | 3 | 5 | 0 | 0 | 0 | 0 |
| Ken Irvine | Wing | 20 | 12.4 (78) | North Sydney | 2 | 4 | 2 | 0 | 0 | 6 |
| Noel Kelly | Prop | 24 | 14.0 (89) | Ayr | 3 | 5 | 3 | 0 | 0 | 9 |
| Lionel Morgan | Wing | 22 | 11.7 (73) | Wynnum-Manly | 1 | 3 | 3 | 0 | 0 | 9 |
| Rex Mossop | Prop, Second-row | 32 | 14.10 (93) | Manly-Warringah | 3 | 5 | 1 | 0 | 0 | 3 |
| Barry Muir | Halfback | 23 | 10.11 (68) | Brisbane Western Suburbs | 3 | 4 | 0 | 0 | 0 | 0 |
| Gary Parcell | Prop | 27 | 14.6 (92) | Ipswich Brothers | 2 | 4 | 0 | 0 | 0 | 0 |
| Johnny Raper | Lock | 21 | 13.8 (86) | St George | 2 | 2 | 1 | 0 | 0 | 3 |
| Elton Rasmussen | Second-row | 24 | 15.4 (97) | Toowoomba All Whites | 2 | 3 | 0 | 0 | 0 | 0 |
| Harry Wells | Centre | 28 | 14.6 (92) | Western Suburbs | 3 | 5 | 1 | 0 | 0 | 3 |
| Bob Bugden | Halfback | 24 | 11.8 (73) | St George | 0 | 2 | 1 | 0 | 0 | 3 |
| Billy Rayner | Hooker | 25 | 13.7 (86) | Parramatta | 0 | 2 | 0 | 0 | 0 | 0 |

== France ==
Coaches: Rene Duffort and Jean Duhau. The team was co-managed by Antoine Blain and the assistant manager was Guy Vassal.

| Player | Position | Age | Weight st.lb (kg) | Club | Games | Tries | Goals | FG | Points |
|---|---|---|---|---|---|---|---|---|---|
| Jean Barthe (C) | Second-row | 28 | 14.7 (66) | Roanne | 3 | 0 | 0 | 0 | 0 |
| Angélo Boldini | Prop | 31 | 15.7 (98) | Villeneuve XIII RLLG | 2 | 0 | 0 | 0 | 0 |
| André Casas | Hooker | 26 | 13.1 (83) | Sporting Olympique Avignon | 2 | 0 | 0 | 0 | 0 |
| Jacques Dubon | Wing | 22 | 11.0 (70) | Villeneuve XIII RLLG | 3 | 1 | 0 | 0 | 3 |
| Robert Eramouspé | Second-row | 24 | 13.0 (83) | Roanne | 3 | 0 | 0 | 0 | 0 |
| Georges Fages | Utility Back | 26 | 13.0 (83) | Racing Club Albi XIII | 2 | 0 | 0 | 0 | 0 |
| Raymond Gruppi | Wing | 23 | 12.5 (78) | Villeneuve XIII RLLG | 3 | 2 | 0 | 0 | 6 |
| Joseph Guiraud | Halfback | 31 | 11.10 (70) | Limoux XIII | 1 | 0 | 0 | 0 | 0 |
| André Lacaze | Lock | 21 | 13.3 (67) | Villeneuve XIII RLLG | 3 | 0 | 5 | 0 | 10 |
| Claude Mantoulan | Five-eighth | 24 | 5.7 (72) | Roanne | 3 | 0 | 0 | 0 | 3 |
| Jacques Merquey | Second-row | 30 | 12.0 (76) | Sporting Olympique Avignon | 3 | 0 | 0 | 0 | 0 |
| Yves Mézard | Second-row | 28 | 15.5 (91) | SU Cavaillon XIII | 1 | 0 | 0 | 0 | 0 |
| Louis Poletti | Fullback | 30 | 10.7 (68) | AS Carcassonne | 3 | 0 | 0 | 0 | 0 |
| Aldo Quaglio | Prop | 28 | 15.5 (98) | Roanne | 3 | 0 | 0 | 0 | 0 |
| Roger Rey | Centre | 28 | 14.6 (92) | Lyon Villeurbanne | 3 | 0 | 0 | 0 | 0 |
| André Vadon | Hooker | 26 | 5.8 (81) | Racing Club Albi XIII | 1 | 0 | 0 | 0 | 0 |

The following players were members of the touring squad, but did not play in World Cup matches.

| Player | Position | Age | Weight st.lb (kg) | Club |
|---|---|---|---|---|
| Marcel Bescos | Prop | 23 | 15.5 (98) | Racing Club Albi XIII |
| Gilbert Benausse | Centre | 28 | 12.0 (76) | FC Lézignan |
| René Benausse | Wing | 31 | 12.9 (80) | FC Lézignan |
| Jean Darricau | Centre | 29 | 5.9 (76) | Lyon Villeurbanne |
| Yvon Gourbal | Lock | 21 | 14.5 (91) | XIII Catalan |
| Bernard Fabre | Halfback | 25 | 11.7 (73) | Racing Club Albi XIII |
| Jean Foussat | Centre | 28 | 12.5 (78) | Villeneuve XIII RLLG |
| Antoine Jimenez | Centre | 31 | 11.13 (76) | Villeneuve XIII RLLG |
| Pierre Lacaze | Fullback | 26 | 10.5 (68) | Toulouse Olympique |
| Roger Majoral | Second-row | 26 | 14.5 (91) | XIII Catalan |
| André Marty | Lock | 29 | 12.6 (76) | AS Carcassonne |
| Robert Moulinas | Five-eighth | 23 | 11.8 (69) | Sporting Olympique Avignon |
| Francis Rossi | Prop | 23 | 13.1 () | Marseille XIII |
| Jean Vergès | Wing | 26 | 11.12 () | Montpellier XIII |

== Great Britain ==
Coach: Bill Fallowfield

1. Eric Ashton (captain), goal-kicking three quarter back for Wigan
2. Billy Boston, right winger for Wigan
3. Jim Challinor, three quarter back for Warrington
4. Alan Davies, three quarter back for Oldham
5. Eric Fraser, full back for Warrington
6. Bobby Greenhough, utility back for Warrington
7. Tommy Harris, hooker for Hull
8. Vince Karalius, forward for St. Helens
9. Brian McTigue, forward for Wigan
10. Alex Murphy, scrum half for St. Helens
11. Frank Myler, stand off for Widnes
12. Austin Rhodes, utility back for St. Helens
13. Brian Shaw, forward for Hunslet
14. Joby Shaw, hooker for Halifax
15. Mick Sullivan, left winger for Wigan
16. Derek Turner, forward for Wakefield Trinity
17. Johnny Whiteley, forward for Hull
18. Jack Wilkinson, forward for Wakefield Trinity

== New Zealand ==
Coach: Travers Hardwick/Manager: Tom Skinner

| Player | Position | Age | Club | Games | Tries | Goals | FG | Points |
|---|---|---|---|---|---|---|---|---|
| Ron Ackland | Centre | 26 | Auckland | 3 | 0 | 0 | 0 | 0 |
| Jock Butterfield | Hooker | 28 | West Coast | 3 | 0 | 0 | 0 | 0 |
| Mel Cooke | Loose forward | 26 | Canterbury | 3 | 1 | 0 | 0 | 3 |
| Reg Cooke | Wing | 21 | Waikato | 0 | 0 | 0 | 0 | 0 |
| Neville Denton | Wing | 26 | Auckland | 2 | 0 | 0 | 0 | 0 |
| Cyril Eastlake | Centre | 30 | Auckland | 3 | 0 | 6 | 0 | 12 |
| Reese Griffiths | Centre | 23 | West Coast | 1 | 0 | 0 | 0 | 0 |
| Tom Hadfield | Wing | 26 | Auckland | 3 | 2 | 0 | 0 | 6 |
| Cliff Johnson (c) | Prop | 32 | Auckland | 3 | 0 | 0 | 0 | 0 |
| Trevor Kilkelly | Second-row | 29 | West Coast | 1 | 0 | 0 | 0 | 0 |
| Henry Maxwell | Prop | 28 | Auckland | 2 | 0 | 0 | 0 | 0 |
| George Menzies (vc) | Stand-off | 30 | West Coast | 3 | 1 | 0 | 0 | 3 |
| Laurie Olliff | Second-row | - | Auckland | 2 | 0 | 0 | 0 | 0 |
| Gary Phillips | Fullback | 22 | Auckland | 2 | 0 | 0 | 0 | 0 |
| Tom Reid | Prop | 25 | West Coast | 1 | 1 | 0 | 0 | 3 |
| Keith Roberts | Scrum-half | 28 | Canterbury | 3 | 0 | 0 | 0 | 0 |
| Bill Sorensen | Five-eighth | 28 | Auckland | 1 | 0 | 1 | 0 | 2 |
| George Turner | Centre | 29 | Auckland | 3 | 1 | 0 | 0 | 3 |
