= Canton of Saint-Laurent-de-la-Salanque =

Canton of France

Coordinates: 42°46′28″N 2°59′29″E

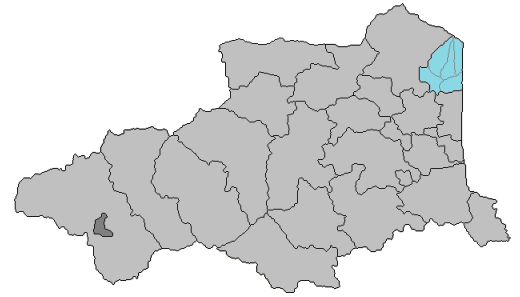
Location of the canton in Pyrénées-Orientales

The Canton of Saint-Laurent-de-la-Salanque is a former French canton of Pyrénées-Orientales department, in Languedoc-Roussillon. It had 23,314 inhabitants (2012).

== Composition ==
The canton of Saint-Laurent-de-la-Salanque comprised 5 communes:

- Saint-Laurent-de-la-Salanque
- Le Barcarès
- Claira
- Saint-Hippolyte
- Torreilles
