= Coupe de France Paul-Dejean =

French rugby league knockout competition

Paul Dejean Cup
- Sport: Rugby league
- Instituted: 2006
- Country: France (FFR XIII)
- Holders: AS Pomas (2024–25)
- Most titles: Tonneins XIII (4 titles)

The Paul Dejean Cup (French: Coupe Paul-Dejean), also called Paul Dejean French Cup (French: Coupe de France Paul-Dejean), is an annual rugby league knockout competition organised by the Fédération Française de Rugby à XIII. It was originally for clubs in the National Division 1, but following its merger with the Federal Division at the start of the 2023–24 season the competition became the cup for the National Divisions.

== List of finals ==
Year	Winner	Score	Runner-up	Ref.
2006	RC Begles XIII	30–23	SU Cavaillon XIII	
2007	Salses XIII	38–20	Montpellier Red Devils	
2008	Palau XIII Broncos	28–2	Ornaisons XIII	
2009	Tonneins XIII	13–12	Realmont XIII	
2010	Tonneins XIII	22–16	Gifi Bias XIII	
2011	Tonneins XIII	27–23	Sauveterre de Comminges XIII	
2012	Sauveterre de Comminges XIII	24–16	Ornaisons XIII	
2013	Villegailhenc-Aragon XIII	37–10	Salses XIII	
2014	Villegailhenc-Aragon XIII	34–16	Saint-Laurent XIII	
2015	US Ferrals XIII	27–26	AS Prexian XIII	
2016	US Ferrals XIII	45–31	US Entraigues XIII	
2017	Sporting Treiziste Toulonnais	28–24	US Trentels XIII	
2018	Pia XIII	26–22	US Trentels XIII	
2019	Tonneins XIII	46–12	Realmont XIII	
2020–2022	Competition not held			
2023	Palau XIII Broncos	46–12	Realmont XIII	
2024	Pamiers XIII	42–22	Salses XIII	
2025	AS Pomas	16–6	Toulouges-Baho-Le Soler	

== 2008 competition ==
Quarter-finals
27 April
Ornaisons XIII	30
Gifi Bias XIII	26
27 April
Apt XIII	18
Sauveterre	17
27 April
Realmont XIII	?
Tonneins XIII	?
27 April
Palau XIII Broncos	58
Villefranche XIII Aveyron	30

Semi-finals
11 May
Ornaisons XIII	30
Apt XIII	14
11 May
Palau XIII Broncos	15
Realmont XIII	14

Final
25 May
Ornaisons XIII	2
Palau XIII Broncos	30

== 2007 competition ==
Quarter-finals
29 April
Salses XIII	Bye
29 April
Roanne XIII	30
Realmont XIII	18
29 April
Cavaillon XIII	36
Entraigues XIII	14
29 April
Villeneuve Tolosane XIII	4
Montpellier XIII	33

Semi-finals
13 May
Salses XIII	30
Roanne XIII	24
13 May
Montpellier XIII	56
Cavaillon XIII	4

Final
3 June
Salses XIII	30
Montpellier XIII	28

== 2006 competition ==
Quarter-finals
13 May
RC Bègles XIII	42
Salon XIII	14
13 May
Montpellier XIII	34
Realmont XIII	18
13 May
Cavaillon XIII	32
Lescure XIII	26
13 May
Sainte-Livrade XIII	66
Roanne XIII	26

Semi-finals
21 May
RC Bègles XIII	54
Montpellier XIII	24
21 May
Cavaillon XIII	56
Sainte-Livrade XIII	4

Final
3 June
RC Bègles XIII	30
Cavaillon XIII	23

== See also ==
- Rugby league in France
- French rugby league system
- Lord Derby Cup
- Coupe Georges-Aillères
- Coupe Albert-Falcou
