= AS Clairac XIII =

French rugby league club

Club information
- Full name: Association Sports Clairacaise XIII

Current details
- Ground(s): Stade Vivens
- Competition: National Division 2 (Aquitaine Region)
- 2016/17: 5th

Uniforms
Home colours

Association Sports Clairacaise XIII who are more commonly known as AS Clairac XIII are a French Rugby league club based in Clairac, Lot-et-Garonne in the Aquitaine region. The club plays in the National Division 2 Aquitaine regional league, which is the 4th tier of Rugby League in France. Home games are played at the Stade Vivens.

== History ==
The club was founded during the early 1950s and reached the old 2nd Division final in 1958 losing out to US Apt XIII 8-18. In 1971 the club began using its current name AS Clairac XIII and in 1980 they lifted their first trophy when they won the Coupe Falcou. In season 94/95 the club won the Federal Division, nowadays called National Division 2 beating Sainte-Livrade XIII in the final 20-12 but didn't opt for promotion. By season 97/98 the club was in a much better condition, on and off the field, and after again winning the Federal Division this time after beating Cabardes 23-17 they accepted promotion. The following season they reached the final and surprisingly beat Gratentour XIII 34-4 but declined the promotion to the 2nd tier. After relegation at the turn of the millennium the club won promotion back to the 3rd tier following victory over Saint-Laurent de la Salanque 30-8 in season 2006/07. Relegation once again followed and despite winning the regional Aquitaine League in National Division 2 they lost out in the play-offs to RC Begles XIII. Season 2012/13 brought success and promotion again after beating US Ferrals XIII. Back in the 3rd tier the club has fared better than previous attempts indeed in season 2015/16 they won the National Division 1 West but lost against Saint-Martin XIII in the play-offs 62-70 over two legs. The club decided to drop down to the regional 4th tier for the following campaign.

== Women's team ==
In November 2018, Clairac played against Réalmont to determine which of the National Division teams would qualify for the Elite championship. As the National Division played only 9-a-side and the Elite was 13-a-side neither team wanted to be promoted so did not try to win the match which the referee abandoned. The win was awarded to Clairac who then unsuccessfully appealed the decision. In order to avoid promotion they were forced to forfeit the season.

In the 2023–24 season, the team reached the final of the National Division, but lost 22–16 to Entraigues/Avignon.

== Honours ==
- National Division 1 (1): 1998-99
- National Division 2 (Fédéral Division) (3): 1994-95, 1997–98, 2006–07
- Coupe Falcou (1): 1980
