= Marius Frattini =

French rugby league player (1941–2023)

Personal information
- Born: 3 May 1941 Entraigues-sur-la-Sorgue, France
- Died: 4 December 2023 (aged 82)

Playing information
- Height: 5 ft 7 in (1.70 m)
- Weight: 11 st 4 lb (72 kg)
- Position: halfback
Club
Years	Team	Pld	T	G	FG	P
1962–73	Avignon	6
1973–74	Cavaillon
1974–79	Entraigues
	Total	6	0	0	0	0
Representative
Years	Team	Pld	T	G	FG	P
1965–73	France	6	0	0	1	1

Coaching information
Club
Years	Team	Gms	W	D	L	W%
	Le Pontet

Marius Frattini (20 June 1941 – 4 December 2023) was a French rugby league footballer who played in the 1960s and 1970s, as a halfback.

== Playing career ==
Frattini played for Avignon, and later, for Cavaillon and Entraigues. At international level, he also represented France between 1965 and 1973, including at the 1968 and 1972 Rugby League World Cups. Outside the game, he worked as first-aid attendant. He also coached Le Pontet before Guy Vigouroux took over.

== Death ==
Frattini died on 4 December 2023, at the age of 82.
