= Roger Majoral =

France former international rugby league footballer

Personal information
- Born: 12 August 1934 (age 92) Ille-sur-Têt, Pyrénées-Orientales, Occitania, France
- Weight: 14 st 5 lb (91 kg)

Playing information
- Position: second-row
Club
Years	Team	Pld	T	G	FG	P
	Ille
	XIII Catalan
	Total	0	0	0	0	0
Representative
Years	Team	Pld	T	G	FG	P
1958–59	France	3
- As of 18 January 2021

Roger Majoral (born in Ille-sur-Têt on 12 August 1934) is a French former rugby league footballer. He played as second row.

Outside the field, he worked as a farmer.

== Rugby union career ==
He spent most of his sporting career for Ille and XIII Catalan, which with the latter he won the Lord Derby Cup in 1959 alongside the likes of André Casas, Yvon Gourbal and José Guasch. Thanks to his good club-level performances, he was capped three times for the France national team between 1958 and 1959.

=== Honours ===
- Champion of the Lord Derby Cup: 1959 (XIII Catalan)

=== International ===
- France (3 caps) 1958-59
