= René Jean =

France international rugby league player (1931–2024)

Personal information
- Born: 20 April 1931 Vedène, Vaucluse, Provence-Alpes-Côte d'Azur, France
- Died: 17 April 2024 (aged 92) Avignon, France

Playing information
Club
Years	Team	Pld	T	G	FG	P
19??–??	SO Avignon
1962–??	US Entraigues XIII
	Total	0	0	0	0	0
Representative
Years	Team	Pld	T	G	FG	P
1957–59	France	6				0

Coaching information
Club
Years	Team	Gms	W	D	L	W%
19??–??	US Entraigues XIII
- Source: https://www.rugbyleagueproject.org/players/rene-jean/summary.html

René Jean (20 April 1931 – 17 April 2024) was a French rugby league player and coach. He played as a halfback.

During his entire career, he played for Avignon, with which he won the Lord Derby Cup in 1955 and 1956, as well disputing the French Championship final in 1957. Thanks to his club performances, he represented France 9 times between 1956 and 1959, taking part at the 1957 Rugby League World Cup.

== Biography ==
Jean was called up for the France national team to play the 1957 Rugby League World Cup alongside his teammates Augustin Parent, Jacques Merquey and Jean Rouqueirol. He also played for SO Avignon at club level, alongside Jacques Merquey, André Savonne, Jean Rouqueirol, Guy Delaye and Jacques Fabre.

Jean died on 17 April 2024, three days before his 93rd birthday.

== Honours ==
=== Rugby league ===
- Team honours:
  - Lord Derby Cup: Champion in 1955 and 1956 (Avignon), Runner-up in 1958 and 1959 (Avignon)
  - French Championship: Runner-up in 1957 (Avignon)
