= Francis Lévy =

French international rugby league player (1930–2009)

Personal information
- Born: 6 November 1930 Vinça, Pyrénées-Orientales, Occitania, France
- Died: 31 January 2009 (aged 78) Perpignan, France

Playing information
- Position: Five-eighth, Halfback, Lock
Club
Years	Team	Pld	T	G	FG	P
	XIII Catalan
1951	Celtic de Paris
	Roanne
	Total	0	0	0	0	0
Representative
Years	Team	Pld	T	G	FG	P
1955–57	France	8

Coaching information
Club
Years	Team	Gms	W	D	L	W%
1975	Pia

Francis Lévy, (Vinça, 6 November 1930–Perpignan, 31 January 2009) was a rugby league player and coach. As a player, he was a utility back.

He played for several clubs during his career. He played for XIII Catalan in 1958 where he won the French Championship and in 1960 for Roanne. He also played during a season for Celtic de Paris before the 1951–52 season. Due to his club performance, he was called up eight times for the France national team between 1955 and 1957, as well disputing the 1957 World Cup.

After his playing career, he became a coach and won with Pia the Lord Derby Cup in 1975.

== Biography ==
He represented France in the 1957 World Cup alongside his teammates Henri Delhoste and Robert Médus.

== Honours ==
=== As player ===
- Team :
  - Winner of the Championnat de France : 1957 (XIII Catalan) and 1960 (Roanne).
  - Runner-up at the Lord Derby Cup : 1954 and 1957 (XIII Catalan).

=== As coach ===
- Team;
  - Winner of the Lord Derby Cup : 1975 (Pia).
