= Augustin Parent =

Former France international rugby league player

Personal information
- Full name: Augustin Marcel Lucien Parent
- Born: 30 July 1935 Villelongue-de-la-Salanque, Pyrénées-Orientales, Occitania, France
- Died: 13 April 2002 (aged 66) Avignon, France

Playing information
- Position: Second-row
Club
Years	Team	Pld	T	G	FG	P
19??–??	Avignon
19??–??	Bataillon de Joinville
19??–??	Avignon
	Total	0	0	0	0	0
Representative
Years	Team	Pld	T	G	FG	P
1956–57	France	9	2			6

Augustin Parent (Villelongue-de-la-Salanque, 30 July 1935-Avignon, 13 April 2002), was a French rugby league player. He played as a second-row.

He played for Avignon, with which he won the Lord Derby Cup in 1955 and 1956. In 1957, Avignon was in the French Championship final, however, Parent was called for the military service, joining the Joinville Battalion. Thanks to his club performances, he represented France 9 times between 1956 and 1957, taking part at the 1957 Rugby League World Cup.

== Biography ==
He was called up for the France national team to play the 1957 Rugby League World Cup alongside his teammates René Jean, Jacques Merquey and Jean Rouqueirol.

== Honours ==
=== Rugby league ===
- Team honours :
  - Lord Derby Cup : Champion in 1955 and 1956 (Avignon).
