= Cahors Lot XIII =

French semi-professional rugby league club

Club information
- Full name: Cahors Lot XIII
- Founded: 1945; 81 years ago

Current details
- Ground: Stade Lucien Desprats (4,000)
- Chairman: Pascal Pieron
- Competition: National Division 2 (Aquitaine Region)
- 2016/17: 4th

Uniforms
Home colours

Cahors Lot XIII are a French Rugby league club based in Cahors in the Lot department in the south of France. Founded in 1945 the club plays in the National Division 2 Aquitaine regional league. Home games are played at the Stade Lucien Desprats.

== History ==
Founded in 1945 by Norbert Issaly, who would be the new club's first chairman, and Raymond Rouviere who was the club's first secretary, Cahors XIII as they were then called had a tough start to life. The new club had no ground as the local rugby club opposed them and blocked their attempts to access any land and for their first match at Lavardac XIII the club had to borrow shirts from US Villeneuve XIII. The green and white shirts borrowed would remain the club colours until 1990. A home ground was finally secured when they were allowed to use the playing fields at a local school, Gambetta High School whose head teacher was a rugby league fan. For season 46/47 the club moved to their own stadium the Stade Lucien Desprats which they have used ever since. Sadly in 1959 the club disbanded and wasn't resurrected until 1969 when local businessman Louis Baldy reformed the club under a new name AS Cadurcienne. In season 74/75 the newly named club won their first trophy when after beating Realmont XIII 9-8 in the National League 1 they were promoted to the top flight. After relegation from the top flight, the club in 1984 were relegated from the 2nd tier and found themselves in the National 2. In 87/88 they won the league and were promoted back to the 2nd tier National League 1, In the final they beat RC Lescure-Arthes XIII 17-8. The following season they reached the league semi-finals but lost out to Pamiers XIII. A change of colours to the cities blue and white didn't bring with it any good luck as a major sponsor pulled out of the club in 1992 leaving them in severe financial trouble, relegation to the bottom tier soon followed. A decade in the National 2 division followed, in which only a play-off defeat to Le Barcares XIII, 10-29, in 1999 got them anywhere near promotion. In 2004 it was announced that AS Cadurcienne and Villefranche de Rouerge XIII would join forces to become Union Villefranche-Cahors abbreviated to UVC and that they compete in the top tier Elite One Championship. In 2007 the partnership was ended and Cahors Lot XIII were born and began life in the bottom tier National Division 2. In season 2012/13 they reached the Midi-Pyrenees regional final against Gratentour XIII

== Stadium ==
The Stade Lucien Desprats has been used by the club since 1946, prior to this they played at the Gambetta High School. The ground has two stands along the length of the pitch. Rugby League and Union are currently played at the ground along with Gridiron Football. The current capacity is 4,000.

== Club Names ==
- 1945-1959 Cahors XIII
- 1969-2004 AS Cadurcienne
- 2004-2007 Union Villefranche-Cahors
- 2007- Cahors Lot XIII

== Club Honours ==
- Elite Two Championship (National League 1) (1): 1974-75
- National Division 1 (National 2) (1): 1987-88
