= Henri Delhoste =

France international rugby league footballer

Personal information
- Born: 22 July 1931 Perpignan, France
- Died: 25 December 2013 (aged 82) Perpignan, France

Playing information
- Position: Prop
Club
Years	Team	Pld	T	G	FG	P
	XIII Catalan
Representative
Years	Team	Pld	T	G	FG	P
1957–60	France	5				0

Henri Delhoste, (Perpignan, 22 July 1931 – 25 December 2013) was a French Rugby league footballer. He played as prop.

He played for XIII Catalan for all of his career, and with said team he won the French Championship in 1957 and the Lord Derby Cup in 1959. Thanks to his club performances, he earned 5 caps for France between 1957 and 1960 and took part at the 1957 Rugby League World Cup.

== Biography ==
He was called up for the France national team for the 1957 Rugby League World Cup alongside his teammates Robert Médus and Francis Lévy.

== Honours ==
=== Rugby league ===
- Team honours :
  - Winner of the French Championship in 1957 (XIII Catalan).
  - Winner of the Lord Derby Cup in 1959 (XIII Catalan).
  - Runner-up at the Lord Derby Cup in 1952, 1954 and 1957 (XIII Catalan).
