= Saint-Laurent XIII =

French rugby league club

Club information
- Full name: Saint-Laurent XIII
- Founded: 1956; 69 years ago
- Website: Website

Current details
- Ground(s): Stade Jep Maso
- Chairman: Norbert Gauthier, Nicolas Bernard
- Coach: Denis Ranciere
- Manager: Christophe Coromina
- Competition: National Division 1
- 2018/19: 5th

Uniforms
Home colours

Saint-Laurent XIII are a French Rugby league club based in Saint-Laurent-de-la-Salanque, Pyrénées Orientales in the Languedoc-Roussillon region. The club plays in the French National Division 1. Home matches are played at the Stade Jep Maso.

== History ==
Saint-Laurent de la Salanque as they were originally known were founded in 1956. A club that has always participated at the lower levels of the French Rugby League pyramids, they won their first and so far only trophy in 1982 when they won the Coupe Falcou beating Realmont XIII in the final. The 2006/07 league campaign, competing in the 4th tier National Division 2 they reached their first final but lost to AS Clairac XIII 8-30. A cup run in the Paul Dejean Cup led all the way to the final in 2014 but ended in defeat to Villegailhenc-Aragon XIII 16-34. In season 2014/15 they lost out to Sauveterre de Comminges XIII 12-14 in the play-off semi-finals but were promoted after a league re-structure

== Honours ==
- Coupe Falcou (1): 1982

== See also ==
- National Division 1
