= Robert Médus =

France international rugby league & union player (1929-1994)

- Birth name: Robert Jules Médus
- Date of birth: 12 April 1929
- Place of birth: Carcassonne, Aude, France
- Date of death: 16 July 1994 (aged 65)
- Place of death: Peyrestortes, France

Rugby union career
Senior career
Years	Team	Apps	(Points)
	SC Mazamet		()
- Rugby league career

Playing information
- Position: Prop, Second-row
Club
Years	Team	Pld	T	G	FG	P
1955-	XIII Catalan
	AS Carcassonne
	Total	0	0	0	0	0
Representative
Years	Team	Pld	T	G	FG	P
1956–57	France	5				3

Robert Médus, (Carcassonne, 12 April 1929 - Peyrestortes, 16 July 1994) was a French former rugby union and rugby league footballer.

He played his first part of career in rugby union for Mazamet alongside Lucien Mias. In 1955, he switched codes and opted for rugby league successfully. He played for XIII Catalan and won the French Championship in 1957. He later signed for Carcassonne and won a Lord Derby Cup in 1961. For his club performances, he is called up five times for the France national team between 1956 and 1957, taking part at the 1957 Rugby League World Cup.

== Biography ==
He represented France in the 1957 Rugby League World Cup with his teammates Henri Delhoste and Francis Lévy.

== Honours ==
=== Rugby league ===
- Team :
  - Winner of the French Championship : 1957 (XIII Catalan).
  - Runner-up at the Lord Derby Cup : 1957 (XIII Catalan) and 1961 (Carcassonne).
