= Frenzy Waterpark =

Water park in Torreilles, France

- Interactive map of Frenzy Waterpark
- Location: Torreilles, Pyrénées-Orientales, France
- Coordinates: 42.75979°N 3.01829°E
- Opened: 2013
- Website: frenzywaterpark.fr

Frenzy Waterpark is a water park in Torreilles, Pyrénées-Orientales, France.

== History ==
They opened in 2013. A video of a man jumping off of the roof of the main water slide went viral. He was featured by the park's Instagram page, having his video reposted, and he was injured from his stunt, sustaining minor bruises. He did a belly flop. The park released a statement assuring he signed the waiver before participating in the challenge. They stated he used the roof for this video unlike what customers can usually use.

They underwent a brief renovation in 2025, adding new attractions to the park.
