= Yvon Gourbal =

Former France RL coach and international rugby footballer

Personal information
- Full name: Yvon Jean Roland Gourbal
- Born: 14 August 1939 Torreilles, Pyrénées-Orientales, Occitania, France
- Died: 31 October 2004 (aged 65) Saint-Laurent-de-la-Salanque, France

Playing information
- Weight: 14 st 5 lb (91 kg)
- Position: Lock
Club
Years	Team	Pld	T	G	FG	P
1958–??	XIII Catalan
Representative
Years	Team	Pld	T	G	FG	P
1960–64	France	4	0	0	0	0

Coaching information

Rugby league
Representative
Years	Team	Gms	W	D	L	W%
1981–86	XIII Catalan

Rugby union
Club
Years	Team	Gms	W	D	L	W%
1987–89	Le Pontet
- Source: As of 17 January 2021

Yvon Gourbal (Torreilles, 14 August 1939 - Saint-Laurent-de-la-Salanque, 31 October 2004) was a French rugby league player and coach.

== Biography ==
He played several seasons for XIII Catalan, a rugby league club based in Perpignan, with which he won the Lord Derby Cup in 1959. Thanks to his club performances, he received 4 caps for France between 1960 and 1964 taking part at the 1960 Rugby League World Cup, however, he did not take part at any match due to his military duties as well as not managing to obtain a long-term permit for said tournament.

After his playing career, he embraced a successful coaching career. Under his guidance, XIII Catalan won four French Championships in a row in 1982, 1983, 1984 and 1985, as well as a Lord Derby Cup in 1985. He ended his tenure at XIII Catalan in 1986, but he later coached Le Pontet from March 1987.

== Honours ==
=== As player ===
- Team honours:
  - Winner of the Lord Derby Cup in 1959 (XIII Catalan).

==== Cap details ====
International matches played by Yvon Gourbal
	Date	Opponent	Result	Competition	Position	Points	Tries	Pen.	Drops
1.	26 March 1960	Great Britain	17-17		Lock forward	0	0	-	-
2.	2 December 1962	Great Britain	17-12		Lock forward	0	0	-	-
3.	17 February 1963	Wales	23-3		Lock forward	0	0	-	-
4.	6 December 1964	Great Britain	18-8		Lock forward	0	0	-	-

=== As coach ===
- Team honours
  - French Champion in 1982, 1983, 1984 and 1985 (XIII Catalan).
  - Winner of the Lord Derby Cup: 1985 (XIII Catalan).
  - Runner-up at the French Championship: 1986 (XIII Catalan) and 1987 (Le Pontet).
  - Runner-up at the Lord Derby Cup: 1983 (XIII Catalan).
