= US Entraigues XIII =

French semi-professional rugby league club

Club information
- Full name: Union Sportive Entraigues XIII
- Website: Official site

Current details
- Ground(s): Stade Georges Mauro
- Competition: National Division 1

Uniforms
Home colours	Away colours

Union Sportive Entraigues XIII are a rugby league team based in Entraigues-sur-la-Sorgue in the region of Vaucluse in the south-west of France. They play in the National Division 1 the third tier of rugby league in France. Their home ground is the Stade Georges Mauro.

== History ==
The first significant date in US Entraigues XIII history occurred in 1967 when the club won the National 2 league, now called the National Division 1 beating SO Avignon in the final. In season 1975-6 they once again reached the National 2 league final this time losing to Salon XIII 2-13. The club were twice runners-up again in the same league in 1988-89 they were beaten by Le Pontet XIII 9-15 and in season 1990-91 they lost out to Saint-Hyppolite 9-17 but were promoted to the National League 1 now called Elite Two Championship for the first time in their history. In the 1994-95 season they won the National League 1 when beating Cannes XIII in the final 22-6 but declined promotion to the top flight . By 2013 the club was back in the 3rd tier the National Division 1 and finished runner-up to La Reole XIII losing the final 26-30. In season 2015-16 they won the National Division 1 East and after play-off wins against Realmont XIII and Saint Martin they lost the final to US Ferrals XIII 20-34 but were promoted back to the 2nd tier when that league was increased Entraigues dropped down from the Elite 2 championship to National Division 1 at the start of the 2024–25 season

== Honours ==
- National 2 (1): 1966-67
- Elite Two Championship (1): 1994-95
