= Canton of La Côte Salanquaise =

Canton of France

Coordinates: 42°46′28″N 2°59′29″E

The Canton of La Côte Salanquaise (French: canton de la Côte Salanquaise, [kɑ̃tɔ̃ də la kot salɑ̃kɛz]; Catalan: cantó de la Costa Salanquesa) is a French canton of the Pyrénées-Orientales department, Occitania. At the French canton reorganisation which came into effect in March 2015, the canton was created including 5 communes from the canton of Saint-Laurent-de-la-Salanque and 1 from the canton of Rivesaltes. Its seat is in Saint-Laurent-de-la-Salanque.

== Composition ==
- Le Barcarès
- Claira
- Pia
- Saint-Hippolyte
- Saint-Laurent-de-la-Salanque
- Torreilles
