= RC Bègles XIII =

French rugby league club based in Bègles, Gironde

Club information
- Full name: RC Bègles XIII
- Founded: 1978
- Website: Official Website

Current details
- Ground(s): Stade Denis Mallet
- Chairman: Alain Martin
- Competition: National Division 2 (Aquitaine region)
- 2016/17: 2nd

Uniforms
Home colours

RC Bègles XIII are a French Rugby league club based in Bègles, Gironde in the Aquitaine region. The club plays in the Aquitaine regional League of the French National Division 2. Home games are played at the Stade Denis Mallet.

== History ==
The clubs first honours arrived in 2006 when they lifted the Paul Dejean Cup after beating SU Cavaillon XIII in the final 30-23. Not long after the club was relegated to the bottom tier National Division 2 where they played in the Aquitaine region. In season 2010/11 they reached, but lost, the regional final against AS Clairac XIII and did the same again in 2013/14 this time losing to US Pujols XIII. Season 2015/16 saw the club move across to the Midi-Pyrenees region.

== Club honours ==
- Paul Dejean Cup (1): 2006
