= Tonneins XIII =

French rugby league club

Club information
- Full name: Tonneins XIII
- Founded: 1934; 91 years ago
- Website: Website

Current details
- Ground(s): Stade Jean-Bernege
- Chairman: Eric Varma
- Manager: Marilyn Varma
- Competition: Elite 2

Uniforms
Home colours	Away colours

Tonneins XIII are a French Rugby league club based in Tonneins, Lot-et-Garonne, in the Aquitaine region. They play in the French Elite 2 championship. The club plays its home games at the Stade Jean-Bernege

== History ==
Founded in 1934 making them one of the earliest Rugby League teams in France. They spent their early years in the lower leagues, indeed it wasn't until the 1990s that the club began to win major honours. A Federal Cup win 1990 was quickly followed In 1992 by a runners-up spot in the National 2 league now called the National Division 1 after losing out to Saint-Hyppolite XIII 12-20. The club was offered and accepted promotion to the 2nd tier. After a couple of seasons in mid-table they then reached the league final in 95/96 losing out to RC Salon XIII 16-30. Two seasons later they once again reached the final but this time were victorious 36-12 against SO Avignon and were promoted to the top tier. Unfortunately despite playing in the top flight off the field the club was struggling after such a massive rise. After a couple of seasons in the top tier relegation followed but the worst was still to come and while in the 2nd tier the club was demoted to the 4th tier Federal Division. In their first season at the bottom 2005/06, they reached the final losing to Sauveterre de Comminges XIII 14-20 but were promoted. Season 2009/10 saw the club lose out in the league final 16-33 to Le Barcares XIII but a year later they were back in the final again and this time won promotion to the Elite Two Championship following their 20-16 victory over Sauveterre de Comminges XIII. It was during this time that they made the Paul Dejean Cup their own winning it for three successive years. 2009 against Realmont XIII 13-12, 2010 against Gifi Bias XIII 22-16 and in 2011 against Sauveterre de Comminges XIII 27-23. Season 2011/12 brought relegation to the National Division 1 The club runs a successful youth set up down to u7s. The u19s have been crowned champions in both 1991 and 2000

In 2019, Tonneins won the Paul Dejean Cup for a fourth time by defeated Realmont 46–12 in the final. In May 2022, Tonneins defeated Realmont in the National Division final and were promoted to the Elite 2 championship for the 2022–23 season.

== Stadium ==
The club plays at the Stade Jean-Bernege, a ground that has two stands along the length of the pitch, behind one end there is a white fence while the other also has a hedge alongside the fence. The players train on the nearby College Germillac

== Honours ==
- Elite Two Championship (National League 1) (1): 1997-98
- National Division 1 (1): 2010-11
- Coupe Falcou (1): 1990
- Paul Dejean Cup (4): 2009, 2010, 2011, 2019
