= Jacques Cabero =

Former France international rugby league player

Personal information
- Full name: Santiago Cavero
- Born: 13 May 1947; Laroque-des-Albères, France
- Died: 15 March 2017 (aged 69); Villelongue-dels-Monts, France

Playing information

Rugby league
- Position: Hooker, Prop
Club
Years	Team	Pld	T	G	FG	P
19??–72	XIII Catalan
1972–??	Pia
	Total	0	0	0	0	0
Representative
Years	Team	Pld	T	G	FG	P
1968–72	France	8	1	0	0	3

Rugby union
Club
Years	Team	Pld	T	G	FG	P
1972	Perpignan
- As of 11 March 2021

Santiago Cavero, known as Jacques Cabero (Labastide-Saint-Pierre 13 May 1947 – Villelongue-dels-Monts, 15 March 2017), was a French rugby league player who played as hooker or prop. He played in his career first for XIII Catalan with which he won the double French Cup/Championship in 1969, and later, from 1972 for Pia with which he won the Lord Derby Cup in 1975. Cabero was also known by his nickname Le Sanglier des Albères (The Boar from Albères).

His performances in club allowed him to represent France between 1968 and 1972, disputing notably the 1970 Rugby League World Cup.

== Biography ==
After his rugby union debuts at Canohés, then at Argelès, he joined the junior team of XIII Catalan in 1966. He also became a junior international for France national rugby league team.

At first-grade level, along with Francis Mas and Raymond Rébujent, he formed the formidable XIII Catalan forwards line and won the French Championship title in 1969, followed by the French Cup in the same year, accompanied that time by Pierre Hors. The following year, he took part to the 1970 Rugby League World Cup during which France defeated Australia by 17–15.

In 1972 he leaves XIII Catalan for rugby union and Perpignan, but after two months, he returned to rugby league after an International Rugby Board ban from playing in the French Rugby Union Championship along with Jean Capdouze and Claude Mantoulan due to their past as rugby league players.

He then joined Pia and added a new trophy to his cabinet by winning the Lord Derby Cup in 1975 against Marseille.

== Honours ==
=== Club ===
- French Champion in 1969 (XIII Catalan).
- Winner of the Lord Derby Cup : 1969 (XIII Catalan) and 1975 (Pia).
- Runner-up at the French Championship : 1970 (XIII Catalan).
