= US Ferrals XIII =

French rugby league club

Union Sportive Ferrals XIII

Club information
- Full name: Union Sportive Ferrals XIII
- Nickname(s): USF

Current details
- Ground(s): Stade de la Fontaine
- Chairman: Jacques Toulze
- Coach: Charley Clottes
- Competition: National Division 1

Uniforms
Home colours	Away colours

Union Sportive Ferrals XIII are a French Rugby league club based in Ferrals-les-Corbières, Aude in the Languedoc-Roussillon region. The play in the National Division 1. They play their home games at the Stade de la Fontaine.

== History ==
In 1977, they finished runner-up in the old 2nd Division, now called the National Division 1 losing to Saint-Cyprien in the final 15-16. The club had to wait until season 2014/15 for their next tilt at success. At the end of that season, after winning the Paul Dejean Cup and the league, they then won the league Grand final against Villegailhenc-Aragon XIII but turned down promotion to Elite Two stating the club wasn't ready. The following season, they once again reached the Paul Dejean Cup final, beating US Entraigues XIII and after finishing second in the league, play-off wins over US Trentels XIII and Tonneins XIII saw them reach a second consecutive final. In the final against league winners US Entraigues, they won 34-20, this time accepting promotion to the Elite Two Championship for the first time. In 2015, the club became Elite One Championship side Lézignan Sangliers feeder team.

== Notable players ==
- Damien Cardace

== Honours ==
- National Division 1 (2): 2014/15, 2015/16
- Paul Dejean Cup (2): 2015, 2016
