= Jacques Jorda =

Former France international rugby league player and coach

Personal information
- Born: 1 April 1948 (age 78) Elne, Pyrénées-Orientales, Occitania, France

Playing information

Rugby union
Club
Years	Team	Pld	T	G	FG	P
1966–67	Stade Toulousain
1967–69	US Carcassonne
1969–71	USA Perpignan
	Total	0	0	0	0	0

Rugby league
Club
Years	Team	Pld	T	G	FG	P
1971–83	XIII Catalan

Coaching information
Club
Years	Team	Gms	W	D	L	W%
1977–??	Saint-Jacques
1983–84	Soler
1984–84	Palau
1985–89	Saint-Estève
1989–91	XIII Catalan
1996–97	XIII Catalan
	Total	0	0	0	0
Representative
Years	Team	Gms	W	D	L	W%
1987–91	France
- As of 16 January 2021

Jacques Jorda (born in Elne, on 1 April 1948) is a French former rugby league player and coach. Starting in rugby union for Stade Toulousain, he made his debut with the club in First Division in 1966 before joining Carcassonne in 1967 and then, USA Perpignan in 1969. In 1971 he switches codes opting for rugby league and for XIII Catalan from Perpignan where he won the French Championship and the Lord Derby Cup.He was concurrently the coach for Saint-Jacques, Soler and Palau before coaching XIII Catalan and France national team leading the latter to an historic success against Great Britain. He ended his career as director of the French Rugby League Federation.

== Biography ==
In his civil life, Jacques Jorda, after his studies at the hotel school of Toulouse, is committed with the town council of Perpignan, then, responsible of the Mutual Assurance Society of the local collectivities and restaurateur in Canet-en-Roussillon.

== Honours ==
=== Player honours ===
- Team :
  - Winner of the French Championship : 1979, 1982 and 1983 (XIII Catalan).
  - Winner of the Lord Derby Cup : 2006, 1976, 1978 and 1980 (XIII Catalan).
  - Finalist of the French Championship : 1978 and 1981 (XIII Catalan).
  - Finalist of the Lord Derby Cup : 1977 and 1983 (XIII Catalan).

== Other honours ==
- Knight of the Ordre national du Mérite (decree of 2 May 2002)
