= Marc Palanques =

Former France international rugby league footballer

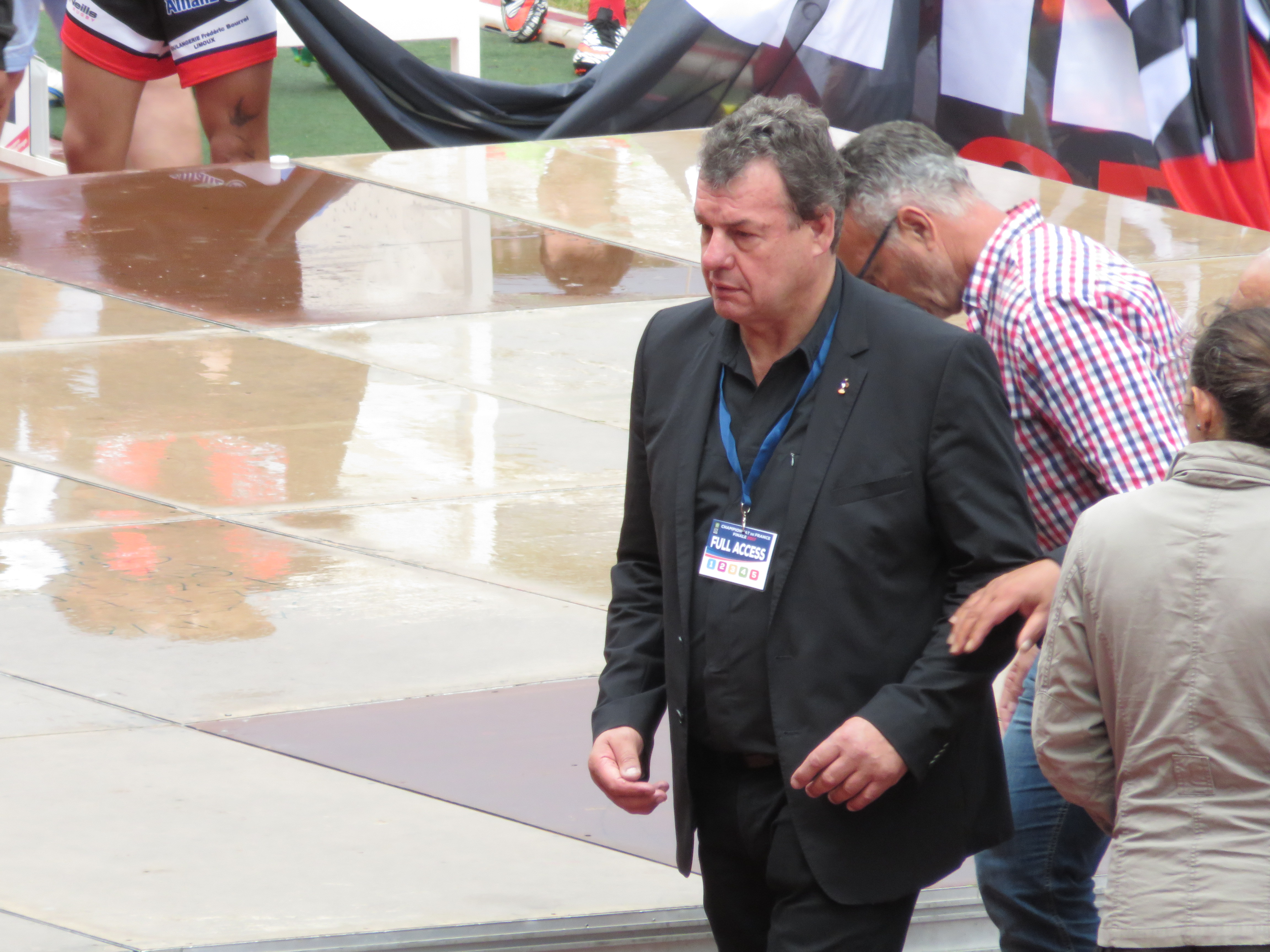
- Marc Palanques

Personal information
- Born: 27 May 1961 (age 64) Carcassonne, Aude; Occitania, France

Playing information
- Position: Second-row
Club
Years	Team	Pld	T	G	FG	P
1979–80	Saint Jacques	?	?	?	?	?
1980–81	Limoux	?	?	?	?	?
1981–84	Carcassonne	?	?	?	?	?
1984–89	Le Pontet	?	?	?	?	?
1989–92	Carcassonne	?	?	?	?	?
	Total
Representative
Years	Team	Pld	T	G	FG	P
1984–87	France	?	?	?	?	?

Marc Palanques (born 27 May 1961) is a French former professional rugby league footballer and a former CEO of the French Rugby League Championship team AS Carcassonne, he is the current president of the French Rugby League Federation since July 2016. He was captain of France national rugby league team in 1987.

Marc Palanques started his career at Saint Jacques in 1979, before moving to Limoux then Carcassonne. With the latter, he won his first title: the 1983 French Cup. In 1984, he changed for Le Pontet and won the French Championship twice, in 1986 and 1988. Finally, he went back to Carcassonne and won two more titles: Championship in 1992 and Cup in 1990.

He made his debut for the France national rugby league team in 1984 and became the team's captain in 1987.

After his career in sport, he created Kingsport, a company which integrated Intersport in 2003, staying on the board of directors. He came back to rugby league in 2015 and became the co-CEO of AS Carcassonne. In April 2016, he announced his decision to stand for the presidency of the French Rugby League Federation.

== Honours ==
=== Club ===
- French Championship:
  - 3 times winner in 1986, 1988 with Le Pontet and in 1992 with Carcassonne.
  - 4 times runner-up in 1985, 1987 and 1989 with Le Pontet and in 1990 with Carcassonne.
- French Cup:
  - 4 times winner in 1983 and 1990 with Carcassonne and 1986, 1988 with Le Pontet.
  - 3 times runner-up in 1982 with Carcassonne, and in 1985 and 1989 with Le Pontet.
