= Stade Saint Ruf =

Multi-purpose stadium in Avignon, France

- Interactive map of Stade Saint Ruf
- Full name: Stade Pierre Baizet St Ruf
- Location: 138 Avenue de Tarascon, Avignon, France
- Coordinates: 43.9232°N 4.8067°E
- Capacity: 1,800
- Surface: Synthetic Grass

Construction
- Built: 1916
- Renovated: 2000, 2008

Tenant
- Sporting Olympique Avignon

The Stade Pierre Baizet St Ruf or as its more commonly known Stade Saint Ruf is a multi-purpose stadium in Avignon, France. It is the home of rugby league club Sporting Olympique Avignon who play in the French Elite One Championship

== History ==
The ground has been used since 1916 as a sporting venue. Originally there were just wooden benches and grass banks to accommodate spectators and during Sporting Olympique Avignon's heyday in the 1950s crowds of 10,000 were crammed around the playing area. At this time a brewery was sited adjacent to the ground but that has since been demolished to make way for a by-pass. New stands replaced the original wooden stands after a fire destroyed the old ones. From 2000 some minor refurbishment took place. In 2008 a synthetic pitch was laid and at the same time another refurbishment saw the pitch realigned nearer to the main stand along with a VIP area, press facilities, a bar and a club shop fitted. The current capacity is 1,800 with 1,000 seated in the main stand
