= Pia, Pyrénées-Orientales =

Pia Pià
- Commune
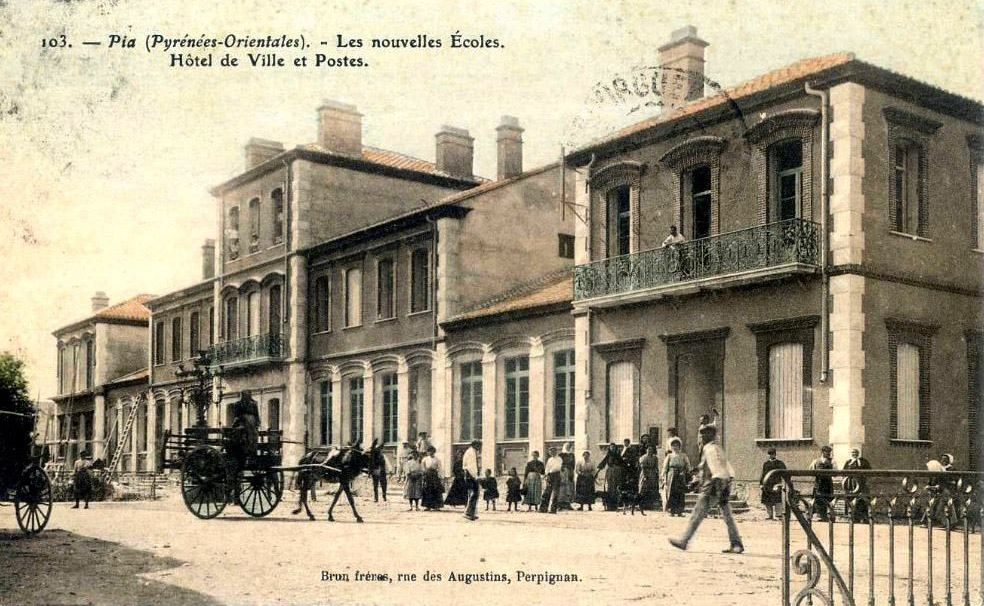
- Pia

- Coat of arms
- Location of Pia
- Location within France Location within Occitanie
- Coordinates: 42°44′45″N 2°55′18″E
- Country: France
- Region: Occitania
- Department: Pyrénées-Orientales
- Arrondissement: Perpignan
- Canton: La Côte Salanquaise

Government
  - Mayor (2020–2026): Jérôme Palmade
- Area^{1}: 13.18 km^{2} (5.09 sq mi)
- Elevation: 27 m (89 ft)
- Highest elevation: 29 m (95 ft)
- Lowest elevation: 7 m (23 ft)
- Population (2023): 11,615
  - Density: 881.3/km^{2} (2,282/sq mi)
- Time zone: UTC+01:00 (CET)
  - Summer (DST): UTC+02:00 (CEST)
- INSEE/Postal code: 66141 /66380
- ^{1} French Land Register data, which excludes lakes, ponds, glaciers > 1 km^{2} (0.386 sq mi or 247 acres) and river estuaries.

Pia (French pronunciation: [pja]; Catalan and Occitan: Pià) is a commune and town in the French department of the Pyrénées-Orientales, and the region of Occitania, southern France.

== Geography ==
Pia is located in the canton of La Côte Salanquaise and in the arrondissement of Perpignan.

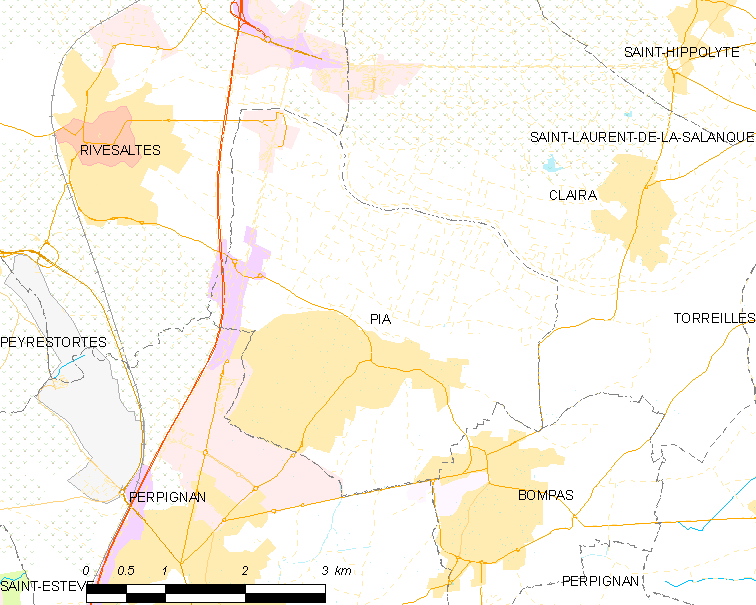
Map of Pia and its surrounding communes

== Population ==
Historical population
Year	Pop.	±% p.a.
1968	2,147	—
1975	2,503	+2.22%
1982	3,226	+3.69%
1990	4,105	+3.06%
1999	5,120	+2.49%
2007	7,134	+4.23%
2012	7,955	+2.20%
2017	9,035	+2.58%
2023	11,615	+4.28%
Source: INSEE

== Sport ==
Baroudeurs de Pia XIII are a semi-professional rugby league club based in the town, who compete in the Elite One Championship.

== See also ==
- Communes of the Pyrénées-Orientales department
