= Saint-Laurent-de-la-Salanque explosion =

2022 disaster in France

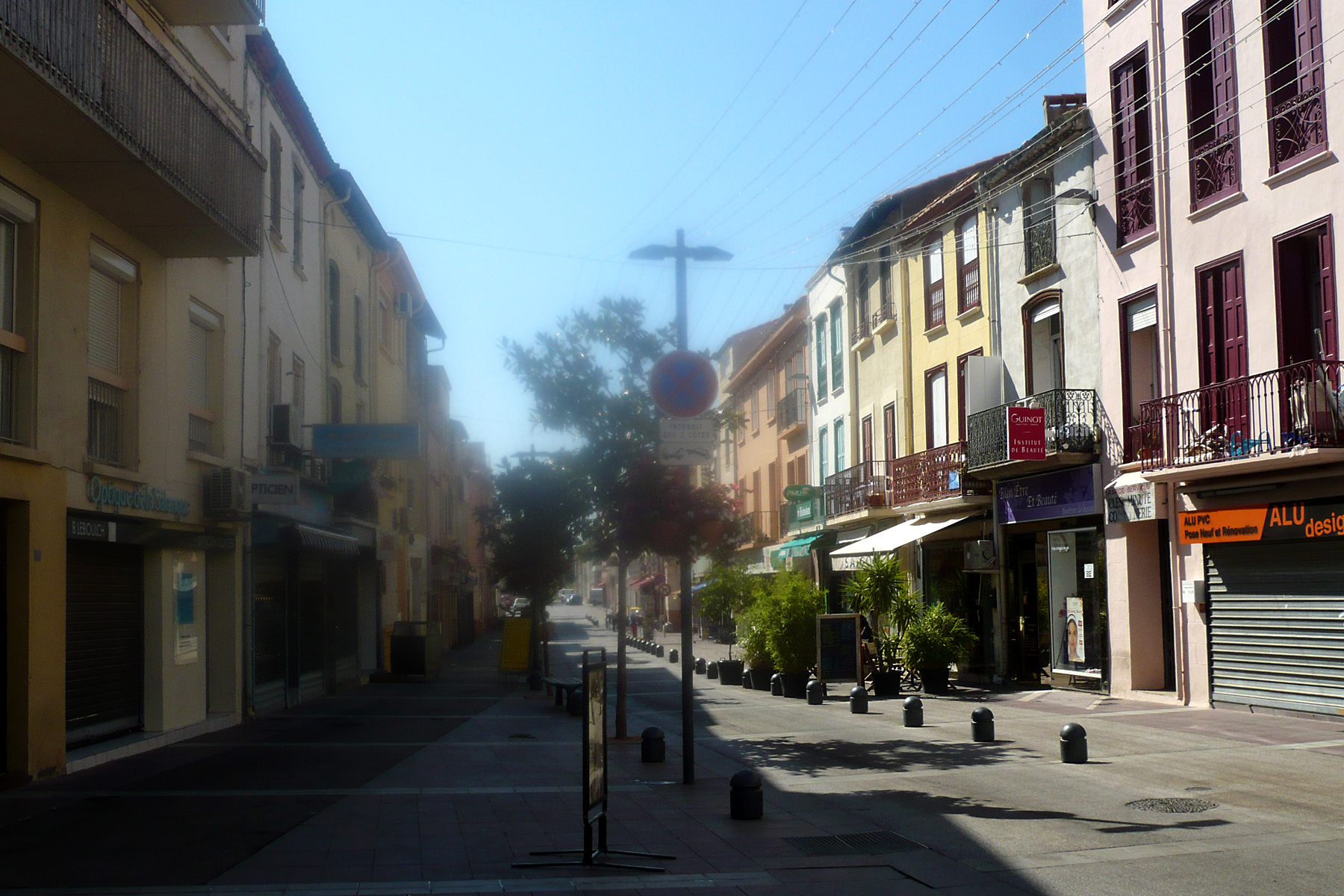
Rue Arago, where the explosion happened.

On 14 February 2022, an explosion caused a fire in Rue Arago in Saint-Laurent-de-la-Salanque, in the Pyrénées-Orientales department of France, killing eight people and injuring thirty others.

== Explosion ==
At around 1:30 A.M., on 14 February 2022, an explosion happened on the ground floor of a building in Rue Arago, Saint-Laurent-de-la-Salanque. It was followed by a major fire occurring either in the snack bar or at the grocery store. At least 11 apartments were affected. A witness said that they had first seen "a very loud explosion", followed by "huge flames." Another neighbour described it as "a horror scene … it was extraordinarily violent." The fire finally died down at noon after authorities had employed a team of 120 firefighters and some gendarmes.

== Fatalities ==
Eight people, including two children, were killed by the blast. Three people were severely injured after inhaling smoke from the fire, and another man who had jumped out the building's window suffered serious injuries. Many survivors of the blast have suffered psychological damage. Among the dead were a young couple and their two children; one was a 2-3-year-old boy and the other was a baby.

While the initial estimated death toll was seven, it was raised to eight the next day. A 66-year-old woman is still missing but unlikely to be alive.

== Aftermath ==
Authorities have launched an investigation into the incident, and are currently investigating if it could be a case of arson. Two gas cylinders were found near the scene.

In April three suspects were taken into custody. All three were of North African origin, including a Tunisian shopkeeper and two Algerians.

Olivier Dussopt issued a statement of empathy for the victims; affirming that "Our thoughts are with the victims and their loved ones." Minister of the Interior Gérald Darmanin tweeted that he was visiting the scene of the explosion.
