= Cannes XIII =

Club information
- Full name: Cannes XIII

Current details
- Ground: Stade Maurice Chevalier
- Competition: National Division 2

Cannes XIII are a French Rugby league club based in Cannes, Alpes-Maritimes in the Provence-Alpes-Côte d'Azur region. The club played in the Provence-Alpes-Côte d'Azur (PACA) League of the French National Division 2.

In 2011, a French writer reports that there is only a youth section operating in the club.

== Club honours ==
- Championship: Tier Two
  - Winners – 1993
