= Billy Rayner =

Australia international rugby league footballer

Personal information
- Full name: William Frederick Rayner
- Born: 22 May 1935 Yass, New South Wales, Australia
- Died: 18 July 2006 (aged 71)

Playing information
- Position: Hooker
Club
Years	Team	Pld	T	G	FG	P
1956–67	Parramatta	195	7	0	0	21
Representative
Years	Team	Pld	T	G	FG	P
1957–64	NSW City Firsts	3	0	0	0	0
1960	New South Wales	2	0	0	0	0
1960	Australia	2	0	0	0	0

Billy Rayner (22 May 1935 – 18 July 2006) was an Australian rugby league footballer who played in the 1950s and 1960s.

== Career ==
Originally from Yass, New South Wales, Billy Rayner went on to play 195 games for Parramatta during a long 11-year career between 1956 and 1966. Rayner's playing career with Parramatta was during a very difficult period in the club's history where they struggled on the field for many years due to having limited resources and a weak playing roster. Rayner collected 6 wooden spoons in his career at Parramatta. He went through a period of 161 successive first grade games without scoring a try, an Australian rugby league record.

He also represented both New South Wales and Australia on two occasions each in 1960. He is listed on the Australian Players Register as Kangaroo No. 360. His usual position was as at hooker. He later went on to be a director of the Parramatta Eels's club. In 1967, Rayner was made a life member of the Parramatta club.

In 1995 Rayner was awarded life membership of the New South Wales Rugby League. In 2004, Rayner was inducted into the Parramatta clubs Hall of Fame. He died after a short illness in July 2006, aged 71.
