= Saint-Martin XIII =

French rugby league club

Club information
- Full name: Saint-Martin XIII
- Nickname: Les Merrinos
- Founded: 1974; 52 years ago
- Website: stmartin13.fr

Current details
- Ground: Stade des Alpilles
- Chairman: Jean Pierre Gerin
- Coach: Jean Pierre Fernandez
- Competition: National Division 1

Uniforms
Home colours	Away colours

Saint-Martin XIII are a French Rugby league club based in Saint-Martin-de-Crau, in Bouches-du-Rhône in the Provence-Alpes-Côte d'Azur region. Founded in 1974. As of the 2025–26 season, the club plays in the French National Division 1 which is the 3rd tier.

== History ==
Saint-Martin de Crau as they were originally known were founded in 1974 by Jean Chaput and began life in the local regional league. In season 79/80 they reached the Federal Division semi-finals and also during the 1980s they hosted the touring Moscow Spartak youth team, changed their name to Saint-Martin XIII and said farewell to founder and president Jean Chaput who stepped down. In 1995 the cadets(youth) team were crowned champions of France. The club reached the Federal Division final in 2000 and then won the Coupe Falcou in 2002. In 2013 they once again missed out on promotion when they lost out to AS Preixan at the semi-final stage. The following season though saw the club promoted to National Division 1 for the first time. In season 2015/16 the club enjoyed their best ever campaign reaching the end of season play-offs before losing to US Entraigues XIII

== Honours ==
- Coupe Falcou (1): 2002
