= Saint-Hippolyte, Pyrénées-Orientales =

Saint-Hippolyte-de-la-Salanque Sant Hipòlit de la Salanca
- Commune
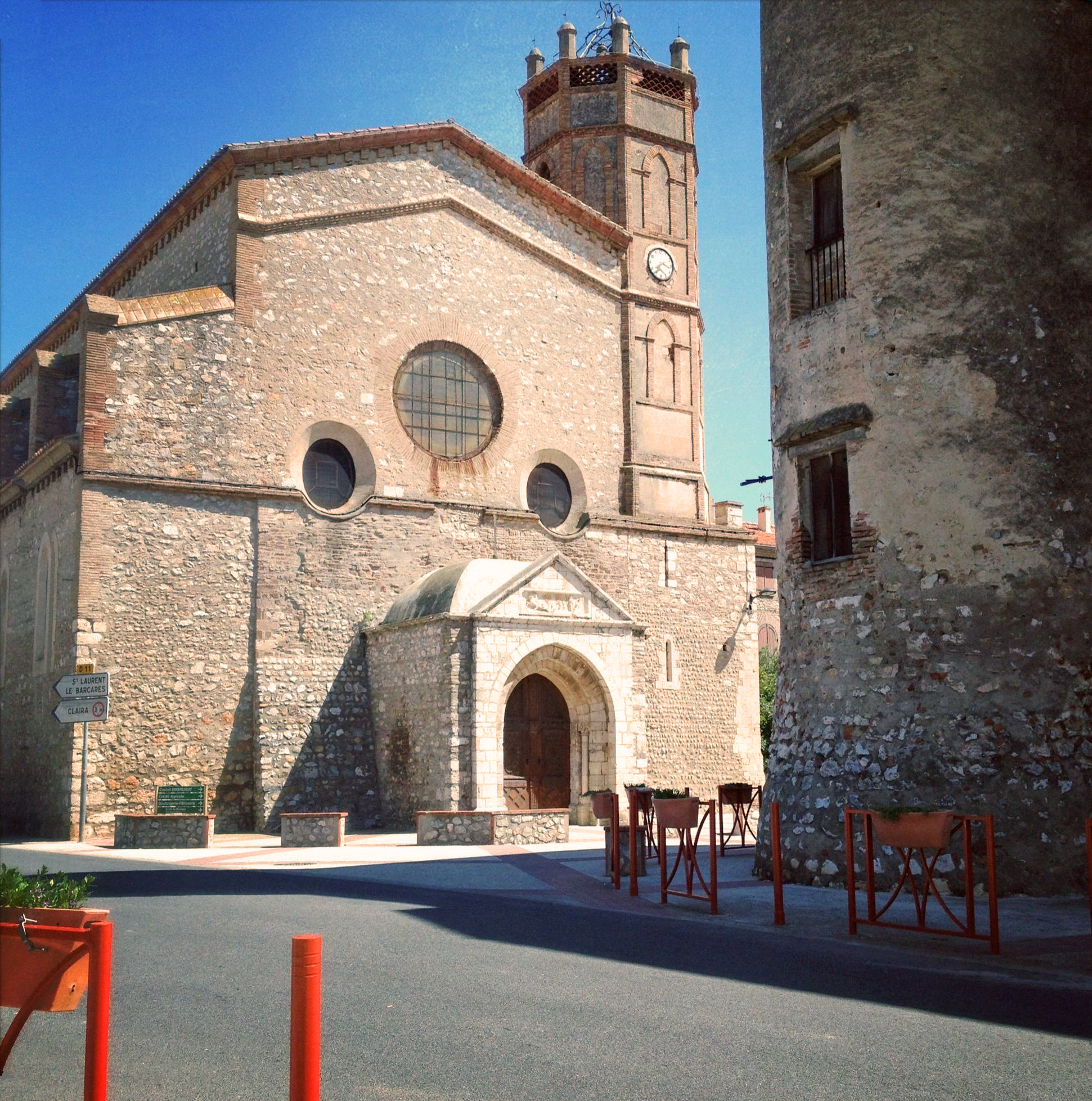
- The church in Saint-Hippolyte

- Coat of arms
- Location of Saint-Hippolyte-de-la-Salanque
- Location within France Location within Occitanie
- Coordinates: 42°47′06″N 2°58′02″E
- Country: France
- Region: Occitania
- Department: Pyrénées-Orientales
- Arrondissement: Perpignan
- Canton: La Côte Salanquaise
- Intercommunality: Perpignan Méditerranée Métropole

Government
  - Mayor (2020–2026): Madeleine Garcia-Vidal
- Area^{1}: 14.65 km^{2} (5.66 sq mi)
- Elevation: 6 m (20 ft)
- Highest elevation: 11 m (36 ft)
- Lowest elevation: 0 m (0 ft)
- Population (2023): 3,126
  - Density: 213.4/km^{2} (552.6/sq mi)
- Time zone: UTC+01:00 (CET)
  - Summer (DST): UTC+02:00 (CEST)
- INSEE/Postal code: 66176 /66510
- ^{1} French Land Register data, which excludes lakes, ponds, glaciers > 1 km^{2} (0.386 sq mi or 247 acres) and river estuaries.

Saint-Hippolyte (French pronunciation: [sɛ̃tipɔlit]), also known as Saint-Hippolyte-de-la-Salanque (pronounced [sɛ̃tipɔlit də la salɑ̃k]; Catalan: Sant Hipòlit de la Salanca, [santiˈpɔlid de la səˈlaŋkə]), is a commune in the Pyrénées-Orientales department, Occitania, southern France.

== Geography ==
Saint-Hippolyte is located in the canton of La Côte Salanquaise and in the arrondissement of Perpignan.

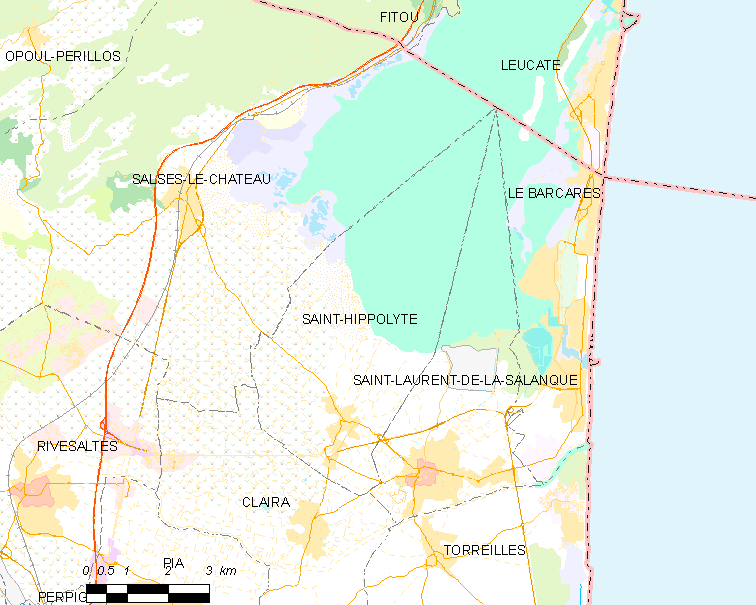
Map of Saint-Hippolyte and its surrounding communes

== Government and politics ==
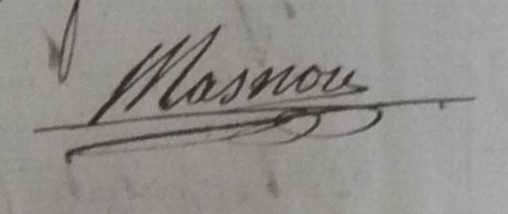
Signature of mayor Étienne Masnou in 1815

=== Mayors ===
| Mayor | Term start | Term end |
|---|---|---|
| Étienne Masnou | ? | June 1815 |
| Pierre Gari | June 1815 | ? |
| Michel Montagne | 2001 | 2014 |
| Madeleine Garcia-Vidal | 2014 | |

== Population ==
Historical population
| Year | Pop. | ±% p.a. |
|---|---|---|
| 1968 | 1,033 | — |
| 1975 | 1,044 | +0.15% |
| 1982 | 1,038 | −0.08% |
| 1990 | 1,616 | +5.69% |
| 1999 | 1,849 | +1.51% |
| 2007 | 2,327 | +2.92% |
| 2012 | 2,719 | +3.16% |
| 2017 | 3,052 | +2.34% |
| 2023 | 3,126 | +0.40% |
Source: INSEE

== See also ==
- Communes of the Pyrénées-Orientales department
