= Claira =

Claira Clairà
- Commune
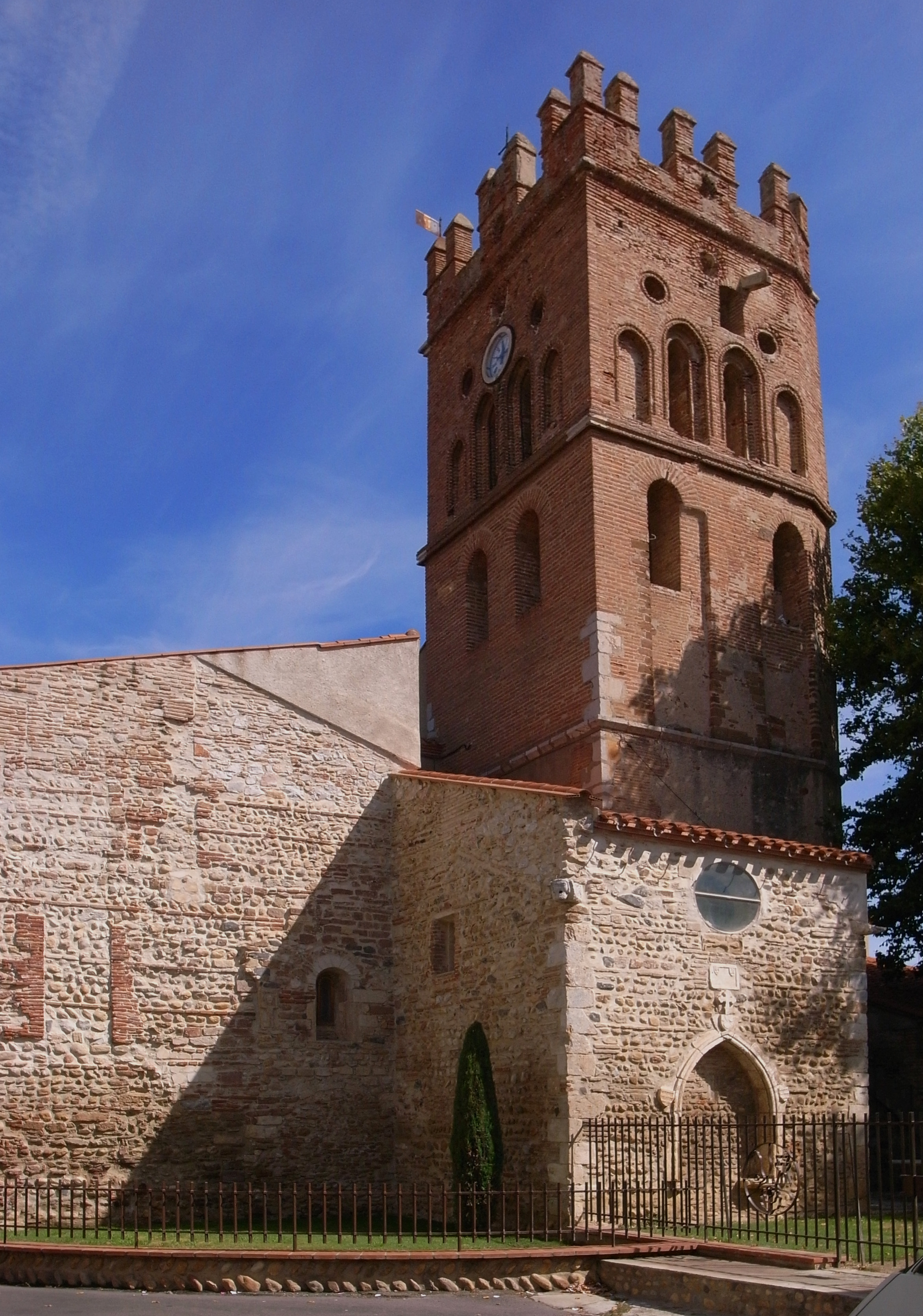
- The church of Saint-Vincent, in Claira

- Coat of arms
- Location of Claira
- Location within France Location within Occitanie
- Coordinates: 42°45′40″N 2°57′22″E
- Country: France
- Region: Occitania
- Department: Pyrénées-Orientales
- Arrondissement: Perpignan
- Canton: La Côte Salanquaise
- Intercommunality: Corbières Salanque Méditerranée

Government
  - Mayor (2020–2026): Marc Petit
- Area^{1}: 19.34 km^{2} (7.47 sq mi)
- Elevation: 10 m (33 ft)
- Highest elevation: 20 m (66 ft)
- Lowest elevation: 5 m (16 ft)
- Population (2023): 4,922
  - Density: 254.5/km^{2} (659.1/sq mi)
- Time zone: UTC+01:00 (CET)
  - Summer (DST): UTC+02:00 (CEST)
- INSEE/Postal code: 66050 /66530
- ^{1} French Land Register data, which excludes lakes, ponds, glaciers > 1 km^{2} (0.386 sq mi or 247 acres) and river estuaries.

Claira (French pronunciation: [klɛʁa]; Catalan: Clairà) is a commune in the Pyrénées-Orientales department in southern France.

== Geography ==
Claira is located in the canton of La Côte Salanquaise and in the arrondissement of Perpignan.

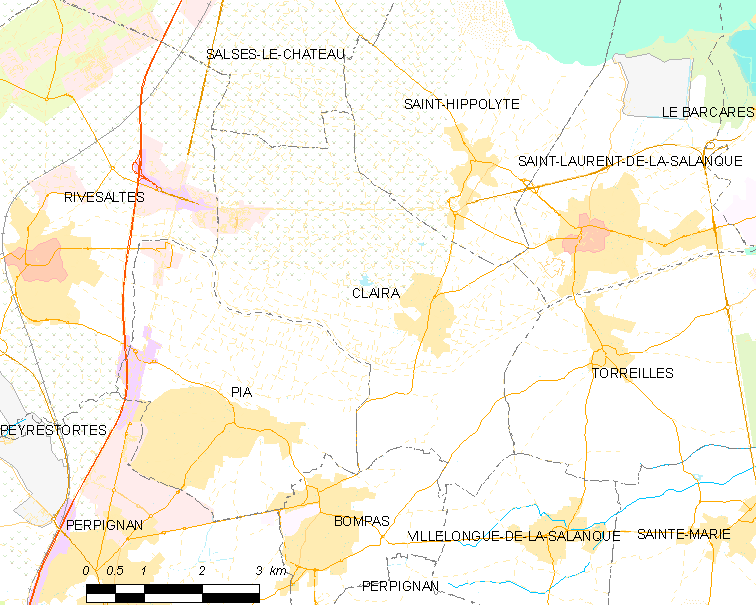
Map of Claira and its surrounding communes

Claira is located 5 km from Perpignan.

== Population ==
Historical population
Year	Pop.	±% p.a.
1968	1,446	—
1975	1,249	−2.07%
1982	1,415	+1.80%
1990	2,117	+5.16%
1999	2,625	+2.42%
2007	3,469	+3.55%
2012	3,756	+1.60%
2017	4,181	+2.17%
2023	4,922	+2.76%
Source: INSEE

== See also ==
- Communes of the Pyrénées-Orientales department
