= André Casas =

France international rugby league player (1934–2021)

Personal information
- Born: 17 September 1934; Saint-Estève, Pyrénées-Orientales, Occitania, France
- Died: 6 April 2021 (aged 86); Saint-Estève, France

Playing information
- Height: 5 ft 7 in (1.70 m)
- Weight: 13 st 1 lb (83 kg)
- Position: Hooker
Club
Years	Team	Pld	T	G	FG	P
	Avignon
	XIII Catalan
	Lézignan
	Total	0	0	0	0	0
Representative
Years	Team	Pld	T	G	FG	P
1959–60	France	8				0

André Casas (17 September 1934 – 6 April 2021) was a French rugby league footballer who played as hooker.

== Career ==
He played for several clubs during his career, starting for Avignon, with which he won the Lord Derby Cup in 1956, later, for XIII Catalan with a Lord Derby Cup in 1959 and finally, for Lézignan, winning a French Championship title in 1963. Thanks to his club performances, he won two caps for France between 1959 and 1960, taking part to the 1960 Rugby League World Cup.

== Personal life ==
Outside the field, he worked as a municipal employee.

== Honours ==
- Team honours:
  - French Champion in 1963 (Lézignan)
  - Winner of the Lord Derby Cup in 1956 (Avignon) and 1959 (XIII Catalan)
