= André Marty (rugby league) =

France international rugby league player

Personal information
- Born: 14 March 1931 Rieux-Minervois, Aude, Occitania, France
- Died: 7 April 2004 (aged 73) Carcassonne, France

Playing information
- Height: 5 ft 8 in (1.73 m)
- Weight: 12 st 0 lb (76 kg)
- Position: Wing, Lock
Club
| Years | Team | Pld | T | G | FG | P |
|---|---|---|---|---|---|---|
| | Carcassonne |
Representative
| Years | Team | Pld | T | G | FG | P |
| 1960 | France | 2 | | | | 0 |

André Marty (14 March 1931 in Rieux-Minervois – 7 April 2004 in Carcassonne) is a former French rugby league footballer who played as a winger and loose forward.

== Career ==
He played his entire for Carcassonne, with which he won the French Championship title in 1952 and 1953, as well as the Lord Derby Cup in 1951, 1952, 1961 and 1963. Thanks to his club performances, he won two caps for France between 1959 and 1960, taking part to the 1960 Rugby League World Cup.

== Personal life ==
Off the field, he worked as a butcher.

== Honours ==
- Team honours:
  - French Champion in 1952 and 1953 (Carcassonne)
  - Winner of the Lord Derby Cup in 1951, 1952, 1961 and 1963 (Carcassonne)
- Runner-up at the French Championship in 1955. 1956 and 1958 (Carcassonne)
- Runner-up at the Lord Derby Cup in 1960 (Carcassonne)
