= Vinça =

Vinça Vinçà
- Commune
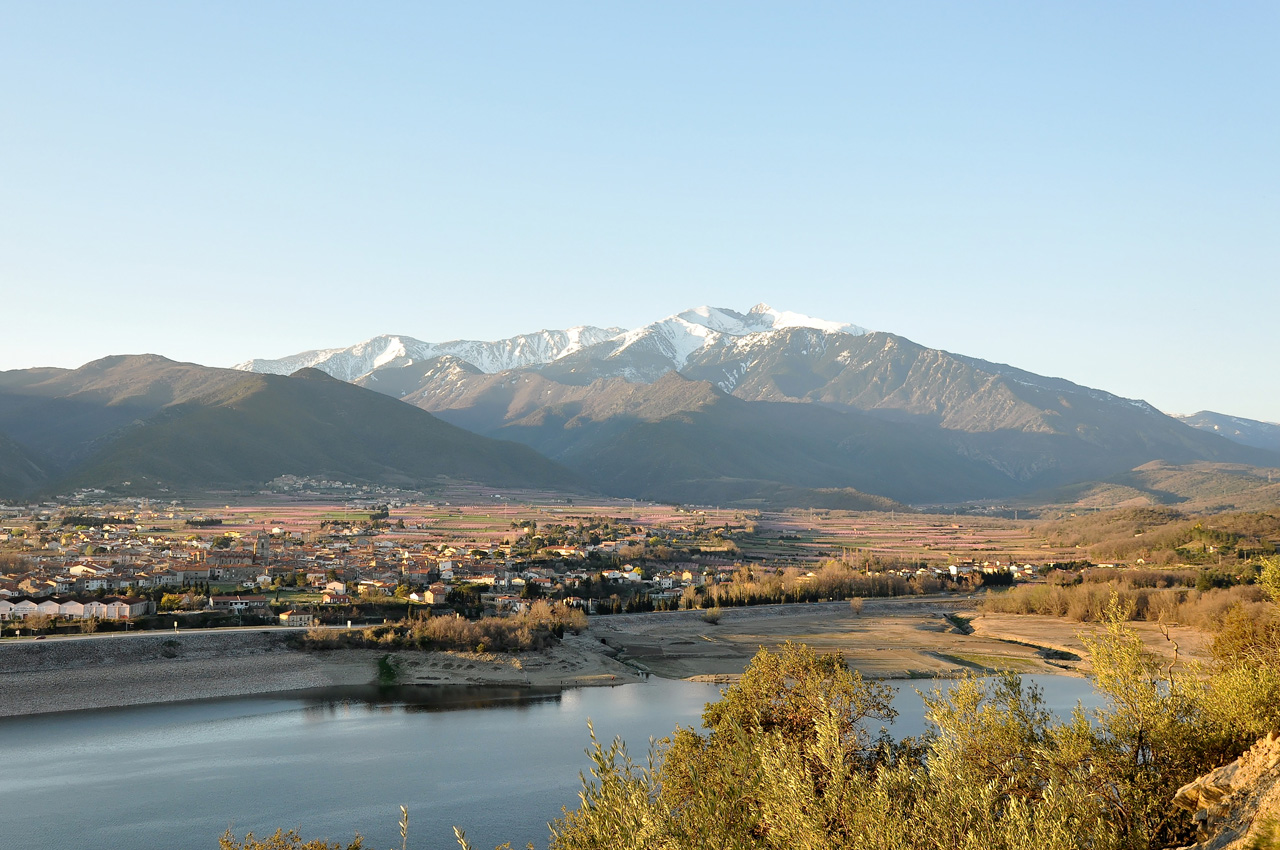
- Vinça, the lake of Vinça and the Canigou

- Coat of arms
- Location of Vinça
- Location within France Location within Occitanie
- Coordinates: 42°38′46″N 2°31′46″E
- Country: France
- Region: Occitania
- Department: Pyrénées-Orientales
- Arrondissement: Prades
- Canton: Le Canigou

Government
  - Mayor (2021–2026): Bruno Guerin
- Area^{1}: 7.74 km^{2} (2.99 sq mi)
- Elevation: 262 m (860 ft)
- Highest elevation: 364 m (1,194 ft)
- Lowest elevation: 199 m (653 ft)
- Population (2023): 2,260
  - Density: 292/km^{2} (756/sq mi)
- Time zone: UTC+01:00 (CET)
  - Summer (DST): UTC+02:00 (CEST)
- INSEE/Postal code: 66230 /66320
- ^{1} French Land Register data, which excludes lakes, ponds, glaciers > 1 km^{2} (0.386 sq mi or 247 acres) and river estuaries.

Vinça (French pronunciation: [vɛ̃sa]; Catalan: Vinçà) is a commune in the Pyrénées-Orientales department in southern France.

== Geography ==
Vinça is located in the canton of Le Canigou and in the arrondissement of Prades.

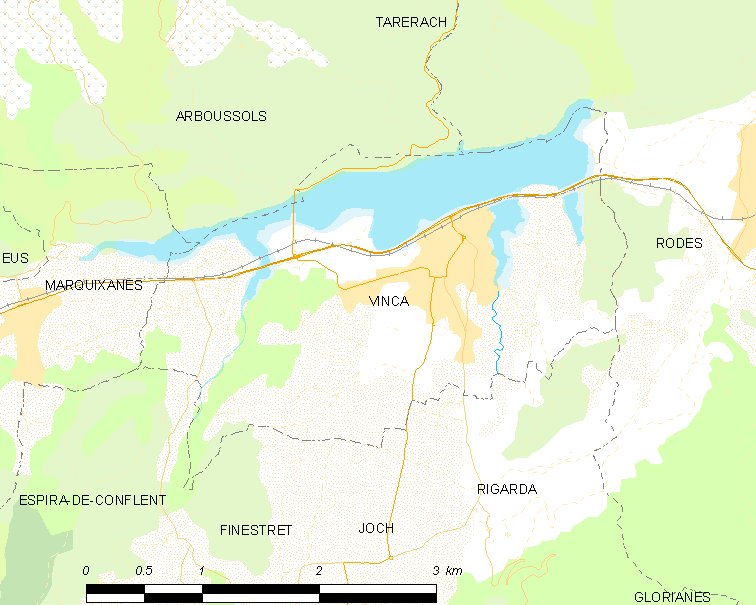
Map of Vinça and its surrounding communes

== Population ==
Historical population
Year	Pop.	±% p.a.
1968	1,622	—
1975	1,587	−0.31%
1982	1,589	+0.02%
1990	1,655	+0.51%
1999	1,666	+0.07%
2007	1,856	+1.36%
2012	1,947	+0.96%
2017	2,075	+1.28%
2023	2,260	+1.43%
Source: INSEE

== Transport ==
The N116 road passes close to the north of Vinça village.

Vinça railway station is on TER Occitanie line 24 (Villefranche-Vernet-les-Bains – Perpignan).

== See also ==
- Communes of the Pyrénées-Orientales department
