= Sauveterre de Comminges XIII =

French rugby league club, based in Sauveterre-de-Comminges

Club information
- Full name: Sauveterre de Comminges Frontignes XIII
- Nickname: Les Frelons (Hornets)
- Founded: 2006; 20 years ago
- Website: Website

Current details
- Chairman: Jean-Baptiste Maylin
- Competition: National Division 1
- 2018/19: 5th

Uniforms
Home colours

Sauveterre de Comminges XIII, nicknamed Les Frelons (Hornets), are a French Rugby league club based in Sauveterre-de-Comminges, Haute-Garonne, in the Occitania region. They play in the French National Division 1.

== History ==
The first mention of Les Frelons came in 2006 when the club reached the National Division 2, then called the Federal Division, league final and won 20-14 against former top flight club Tonneins XIII earning themselves promotion. In 2007 they won the Coupe Falcou. In the National Division 1 the club did well they reached the final in 2011 but lost to Tonneins XIII 16-20, who they also lost out to in the Paul Dejean Cup 23-27, the following season they also reached the league final this time they won beating Ornaisons XIII 28-4, and by a massive coincidence they also played Ornaisons XIII in the Paul Dejean Cup final winning 24-16. The club declined the offer of promotion to the 2nd tier Elite Two Championship.

== Honours ==
- National Division 1 (1): 2011-12
- National Division 2 (Federal Division) (1): 2005-06
- Coupe Falcou (1): 2007
- Paul Dejean Cup (1): 2012
