= Le Barcarès =

Le Barcarès El Barcarès (Catalan)
- Commune
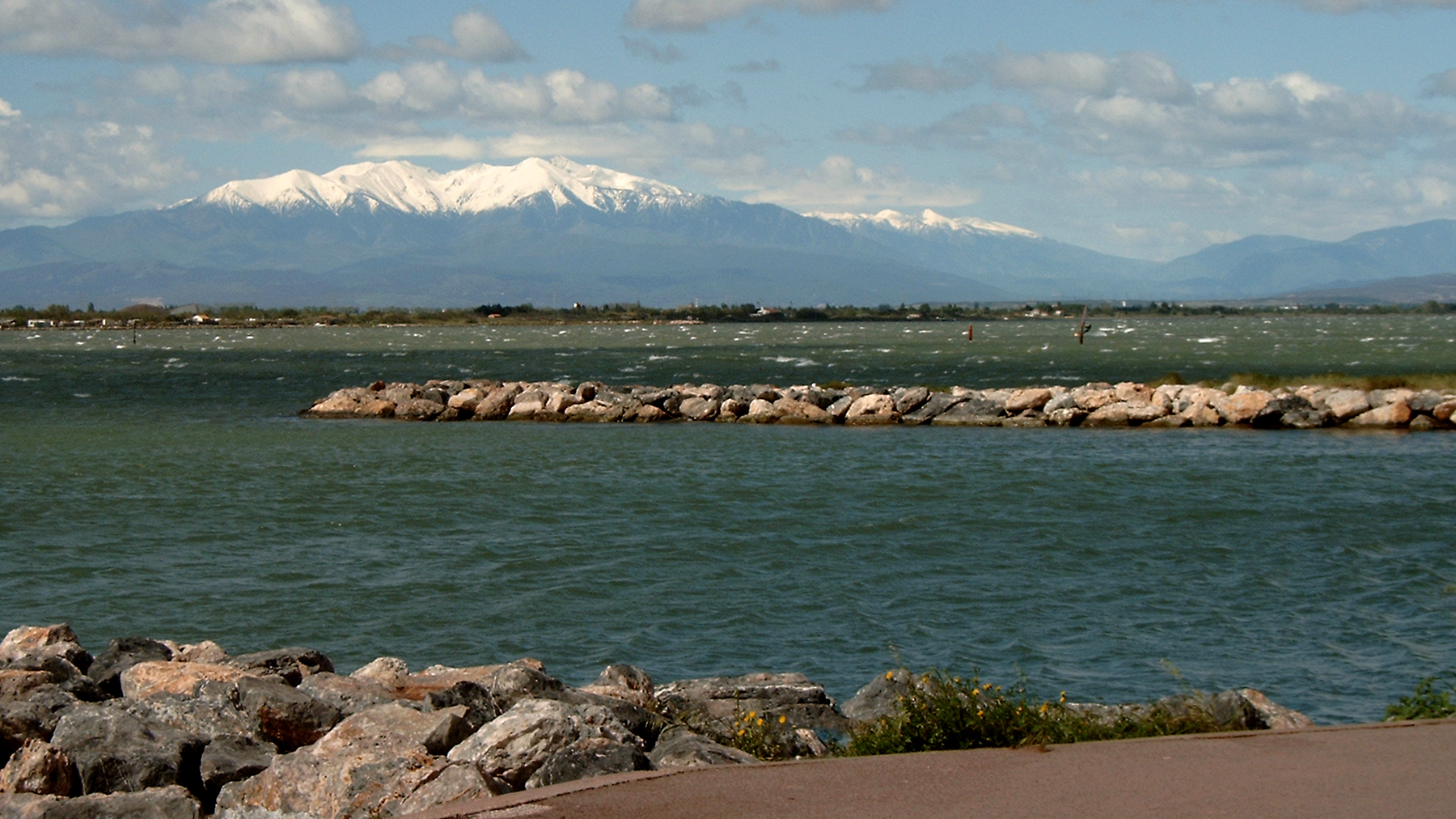
- The Canigó peak seen from Port Murano, in Barcarès

- Coat of arms
- Location of Le Barcarès
- Location within France Location within Occitanie
- Coordinates: 42°47′21″N 3°02′11″E
- Country: France
- Region: Occitania
- Department: Pyrénées-Orientales
- Arrondissement: Perpignan
- Canton: La Côte Salanquaise
- Intercommunality: Perpignan Méditerranée Métropole

Government
  - Mayor (2026–32): Alain Ferrand (DVD)
- Area^{1}: 11.65 km^{2} (4.50 sq mi)
- Elevation: 1 m (3.3 ft)
- Highest elevation: 4 m (13 ft)
- Lowest elevation: 0 m (0 ft)
- Population (2023): 6,109
  - Density: 524.4/km^{2} (1,358/sq mi)
- Demonym(s): barcarésien (fr) barcaresenc (ca)
- Time zone: UTC+01:00 (CET)
  - Summer (DST): UTC+02:00 (CEST)
- INSEE/Postal code: 66017 /66420
- ^{1} French Land Register data, which excludes lakes, ponds, glaciers > 1 km^{2} (0.386 sq mi or 247 acres) and river estuaries.

Le Barcarès (French pronunciation: [lə baʁkaʁɛs]; Catalan: El Barcarès [əɫ bərkəˈɾɛs]) is a commune in the Pyrénées-Orientales department in southern France bordering the Mediterranean Sea.

== History ==
During the mid 19th century, Le Barcarès was created as a small fishing village which developed until the mid- 20th century prior to the local economy redirecting towards the tourism industry.

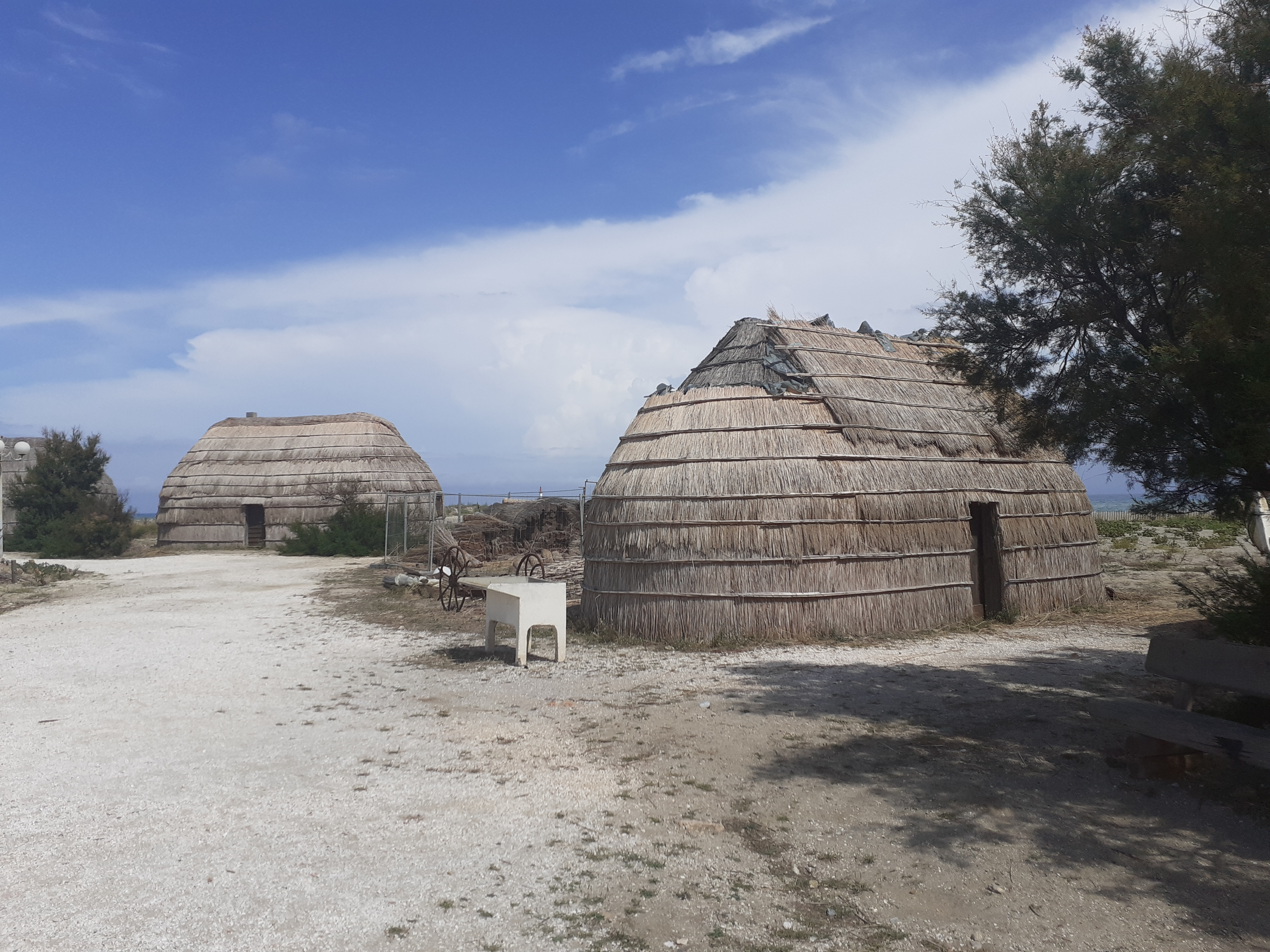
Le Barcarès 19th century restored fishing huts

At the end of the Spanish Civil War, Le Barcarès was the site of a camp housing Republican escapees from Spain. Conditions were slightly better than at other camps, as most internees sent there had indicated a willingness to return to Spain.

== Geography ==
=== Localisation ===
Le Barcarès is located in the canton of La Côte Salanquaise and in the arrondissement of Perpignan.

It is part of the Northern Catalan comarca of Rosselló.

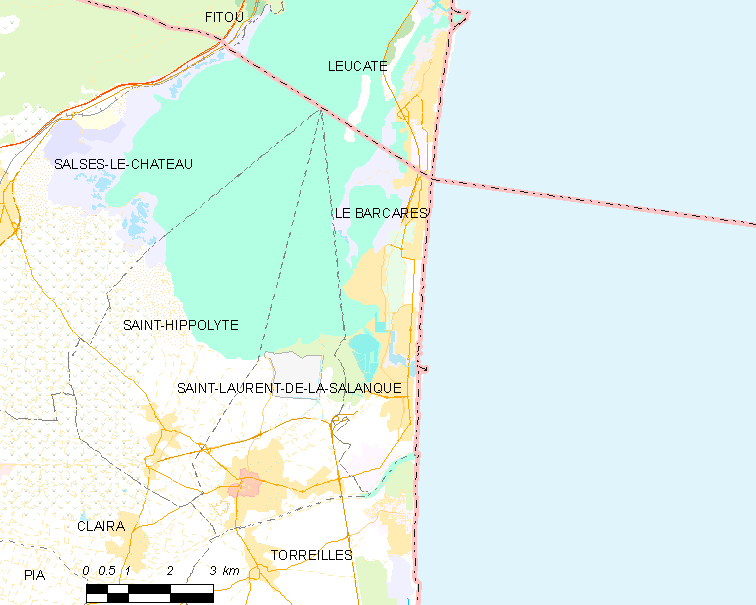
Map of Le Barcarès and its surrounding communes

== Government and politics ==
Mayors

Mayor	Term start	Term end
Albert Got	May 1953	March 1983
Yvon Blanc	March 1983	March 1989
Claude Got	March 1989	June 1995
Alain Ferrand	June 1995	March 1999
Joëlle Ferrand	May 1999	June 2011
Marie Roses	June 2011	August 2011
Alain Ferrand	August 2011	

== Population ==
Historical population
Year	Pop.	±% p.a.
1968	1,197	—
1975	1,347	+1.70%
1982	2,208	+7.32%
1990	2,422	+1.16%
1999	3,514	+4.22%
2007	4,005	+1.65%
2012	4,080	+0.37%
2017	5,915	+7.71%
2023	6,109	+0.54%
Source: INSEE

== Notable people ==
- Georges Candilis (1913-1995), Greek architect and urbanist who participated to the conception of Port-Barcarès.

== See also ==
- Communes of the Pyrénées-Orientales department
