= Sainte-Livrade XIII =

French rugby league club

Club information
- Full name: SSL XIII Les Aigles Livradois
- Founded: 1939; 87 years ago

Current details
- Chairman: Florent Kouassi
- Coach: Francky Goffin
- Competition: National Division 2 (Aquitaine Region)

Uniforms
Home colours

Sainte-Livrade XIII are a French Rugby league club based in Sainte-Livrade in the region of Lot-et-Garonne in southern France. The club was founded in 1939. They currently play in the National Division 2 Aquitaine regional league.

== History ==
Founded in 1939 just prior to the outbreak of World War II as SSL XIII Les Aigles Livradois, the club due to the Vichy Government was forced to close down almost immediately due to the banning of the sport of Rugby League. It wasn't until season 77/78 that they reached a major final, where they lost out narrowly to Realmont XIII in the National 2, now called the National Division 1, final 13–14. The Coupe Falcou would bring success as they lifted the cup on no fewer than 4 occasions, 87, 94, 2000 and 2002. Promotion at the start of the new millennium, following a league re-structure, took them into the 2nd tier Elite Two Championship and in season 2002/03 they won the competition when they beat heavy favourites UTC 2 25–15. Despite winning the league the club didn't get promoted due to their size and slowly the better players left which eventually cost the club their 2nd tier status. The steady decline continued resulting in another relegation to the 4th and bottom tier. Season 2013/14 saw them top the regional Aquitaine League.

== Club honours ==
- Elite Two Championship (1): 2002–03
- Coupe Falcou (4): 1987, 1994, 2000, 2002
