= Jean Rouqueirol =

Former France international rugby league footballer

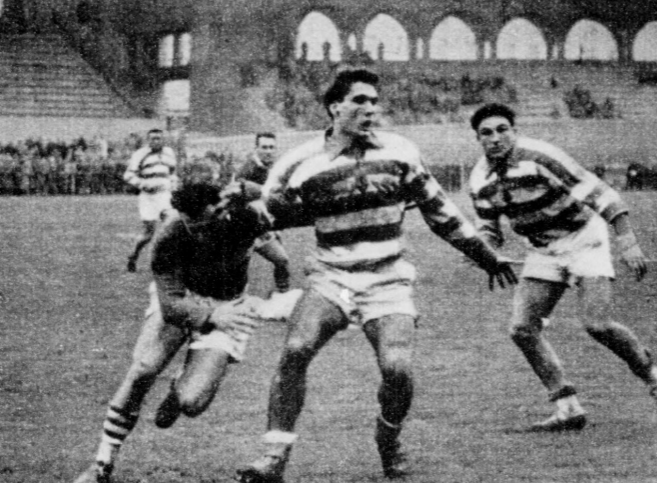
- Rouqueirol playing for SO Avignon in 1953

Personal information
- Born: 19 April 1933 Aramon, Gard, Occitania, France
- Died: 19 February 2011 (aged 77) Avignon, France

Playing information
- Height: 1.79 m (5 ft 10 in)
- Weight: 82 kg (12 st 13 lb)
- Position: fullback, loose forward
Club
Years	Team	Pld	T	G	FG	P
1955–59	SO Avignon	13
	RC Roanne XIII
	Marseille XIII
	Total	13	0	0	0	0
Representative
Years	Team	Pld	T	G	FG	P
1955–59	France	10	3	1		11

Coaching information
Club
Years	Team	Gms	W	D	L	W%
1958–60	SO Avignon
1981–84	SO Avignon
1987–88	SO Avignon
	Total	0	0	0	0
- Source: http://www.rugbyleagueproject.org/players/jean-rouqueyrol/summary.html

Jean Rouqueirol (19 April 1933 – 19 February 2014) was a French rugby league player. He played as fullback, loose forward.

== Biography ==
At club level, he first played for SO Avignon, along with his brothers Claude and Fernand. He later played for RC Roanne and then for Marseille XIII.

Rouqueirol also represented France between 1955 and 1959, including at the 1957 Rugby League World Cup.

After retiring as player, he became a coach, coaching SO Avignon, which won the Lord Derby Cup in 1982.

== Honours ==
- Rugby league:
  - French Championship :
    - Finalist in 1956 (SO Avignon)
  - Lord Derby Cup:
  - 2 times champion: 1954 and 1955 (SO Avignon)
  - 2 times finalist: 1957 and 1958 (SO Avignon)
