= Realmont XIII =

French semi-professional rugby league club

Club information
- Full name: Realmont XIII
- Nickname(s): Les Griffons
- Founded: 1935; 90 years ago
- Website: Official Site

Current details
- Ground(s): Stade Claude Andre
- Chairman: Michel Amiel
- Competition: Elite 2

Uniforms
Home colours

Realmont XIII are a French rugby league club based in Realmont in the Tarn region of Occitania. The club was promoted to the Elite 2 Championship at the start of the 2024–25 season. The club plays home games at the Stade Claude Andre

== History ==
The club was founded on 19 December 1935 making it one of the earliest Rugby League sides in France. Playing in regional divisions they were runner-up in 1939 in the Pyrenees Championship and were winners of the Champion du Rouergue in 1946. In 1976 the National 2 league was set up and the club were invited to participate, in 1978 they won the new league beating Sainte-Livrade XIII in the final 14–13. Lean years followed and apart from a losing Federal Cup appearance in 1982 (v Saint-Laurent XIII) the club despite being a regular in the 3rd tier never mounted a serious title challenge.

Season 97/98 began a short period of National 2 finals, losing firstly against Puygouzon XIII 15-17 and another loss to Palau XIII Broncos 12–28 in 2000. 2009 was a painful season as they once again reached the National 2 final, now under its current title National Division 1, losing this time against Villefranche XIII Aveyron 20-24 this was coupled with defeats in the Coupe Falcou final against Le Barcares XIII and the Paul Dejean Cup final against Tonneins XIII. In season 2012/13 some 35 years after their last title win at this level, they won the league for only their second time when they beat La Reole XIII 23–4. The club though chose not to accept promotion to the 2nd tier. Despite finishing 4th in 2016/17 the club battled through the play-offs and reached the final where they were narrowly defeated by US Pujols XIII 23–26.

== Notable players ==
- Bernard Garcia
- Bernard Houles

== Honours ==
- National Division 1 (National 2) (2): 1977–78, 2012–13
