= US Avignon Le Pontet 84 Rugby =

French rugby club

- Founded: 1919; 107 years ago (US Le Pontet Rugby)
- Disbanded: 2020; 6 years ago
- Location: Avignon and Le Pontet, Vaucluse, France
- Ground(s): Stade de Fargues, Le Pontet (Capacity: 6,000)

Union Sportive Avignon Le Pontet 84 Rugby was a rugby union team representing the neighbouring cities of Avignon and Le Pontet, Vaucluse, France. It was the product of the 1998 fusion of Jeunesse Sportive Avignonaise and US Le Pontet Rugby. It went bankrupt in 2020, and was succeeded in the market by a new entity, simply called Avignon Le Pontet Rugby.

USAP 84 Rugby could trace its lineage to US Le Pontet XIII, a championship-winning rugby league team, which merged with US Le Pontet's rugby union section following a conflict with the French Rugby League Federation in 1989. It also claimed the unofficial legacy of rugby union team Entente Sportive Avignon Saint-Saturnin, which Jeunesse Sportive Avignonaise replaced.

== History ==
=== US Le Pontet Rugby ===
The organization was founded as a rugby union operation in 1919. It was part of eponymous multisports club US Le Pontet, sometimes credited Union Sportive Pontétienne. It switched codes in 1935 for the newly imported game of rugby league, and was a pioneer for the sport in the Provence region.

The club's rugby union team was revived in 1965 as a separate branch, although it went through bouts of inactivity during the 1970s. Meanwhile, the rugby league section rose to prominence in the 1980s under president Alain Cortade, the city's future mayor, reaching five championship finals in a row, of which it won two. In addition, it reached two Coupe de France (Lord Derby Cup) finals, winning both.

==== 1989 clash with FFRXIII ====
The club was the dominant force again during the 1988-89 campaign, but their consecutive losses in that season's championship and Coupe de France finals were marred by a string of on-field incidents and objections to the federation's ensuing disciplinary actions. To protest what it saw as institutional bias, the team decided to boycott the European Club Challenge, a new competition pitting the French champion (Le Pontet had qualified by virtue of their previous year's title) against British champion Widnes RLFC for the right to challenge the Australian Rugby League champions in the inaugural World Club Challenge, on two days notice. As a result, the French federation suspended the club for twelve months, and its leadership was banned from the sport. In retaliation, the rugby league team ceased its activities and merged with the rugby union section of US Le Pontet.

The rekindled union team was soon promoted from 3rd Division to 2nd Division in 1990, and again to 1st Division in 1992. However, the club imploded from the resulting financial strain before it could even finish its first season at that level, and had to restart in the lowly Division d'Honneur.

=== Jeunesse Sportive Avignonaise ===
Jeunesse Sportive Avignonaise was founded in 1992, largely to resume the developmental activities of Entente Sportive Avignon Saint-Saturnin following that club's bankruptcy the previous year.

=== Fusion of US Le Pontet Rugby and Jeunesse Sportive Avignonaise ===
In 1998, US Le Pontet Rugby merged with Jeunesse Sportive Avignonaise, and took the name Le Pontet Avignon Rugby Club 84 (PARC 84)—84 being the administrative number of the Vaucluse department. It adopted a yellow and blue scheme, which mixed the traditional colors of both cities. In 2004, the club changed its name to US Avignon Le Pontet 84 Rugby at the request of former US Le Pontet boss, and now Le Pontet mayor, Alain Cortade, who wanted to unify several Avignon/Le Pontet joint teams across different sports under the same "US Avignon Le Pontet 84" brand.

=== Bankruptcy and rebirth as Avignon Le Pontet Rugby ===
In 2020, the club, which had been suffering from financial difficulties since 2016, went bankrupt. A successor entity was created by a new executive team, under the name Avignon Le Pontet Rugby.

== Notable personnel ==
- Denis Bergé
- Thierry Bernabé
- Didier Couston
- Marcel Criotier
- David Fraisse
- José Giné
- Bernard Imbert
- Marius Frattini (head coach)
- Christian Maccali
- John Maguire
- Marc Palanques
- Patrick Rocci
- Serge Titeux

== Honours ==
=== Rugby league ===
- French Rugby League Championship (2): 1985–86, 1987–88
- Lord Derby (2): 1985–86, 1987–88
- Coupe Albert-Falcou 1988–89

== See also ==
- US Le Pontet Grand Avignon 84, a soccer team that used to be part of the same organization
