= SU Cavaillon XIII =

French semi-professional rugby league club

Club information
- Full name: Sporting Union Cavaillonnais XIII
- Nickname: Les Melonies
- Founded: 1938; 88 years ago

Current details
- Ground: Stade Pagnetti
- Competition: National Division 1
- 2018/19: 7th

Uniforms
Home colours

Sporting Union Cavaillonnais XIII are a French Rugby league club based in Cavaillon, Vaucluse in the Provence-Alpes-Côte d’Azur region. The club plays in the French National Division 1 which is the French rugby league's 3rd tier. Founded in 1938, their home games are played at the Stade Pagnetti.

== History ==
Founded in 1938, when rugby club Sporting Union Cavaillonnais decided to switch codes to the expanding Rugby League. Remaining an amateur club they started their debut season in the 3rd tier 2nd Division where they would stay until the 1960s. By 1966 the club was in the 2nd tier National League 1 and were semi-finalists in the league play-offs in 68/69 and better still they reached the Lord Derby Cup semi-finals in 72, Still to this day their best cup run. In season 83/84 SU Cavaillon XIII, as they were now called, had their best league campaign when after reaching the final of National League 1 (now called Elite Two) they beat Roanne XIII 32-20. That would prove to be the clubs best era at that level and by the early 1990s the club was back in the 3rd tier. In 1996/97 Cavaillon reached the National Division 1 final but were beaten by Morieres XIII 8-12 and within the next five years they found themselves down in the 4th tier. In season 2004/05 SU Cavaillon won the regional Provence league in National Division 2 and after winning through the play-offs met Ornaisons in the final losing out 11-28. The following season they reached the Paul Dejean Cup final but lost again this time to Begles XIII 23-30. When the French leagues were restructured in 2012 Cavaillon were promoted to an expanded National Division 1 East.

== Stadium ==
The club have always used the Stade Pagnetti which is a multi-use sports stadium in the city. Both rugby league and union are played there along with football, with ARC Cavaillon tenants along with US Cavaillon XIII

== Honours ==
- National League 1 (Elite Two) (1): 1983-84
