= Torreilles =

Torreilles Torrelles de la Salanca
- Commune
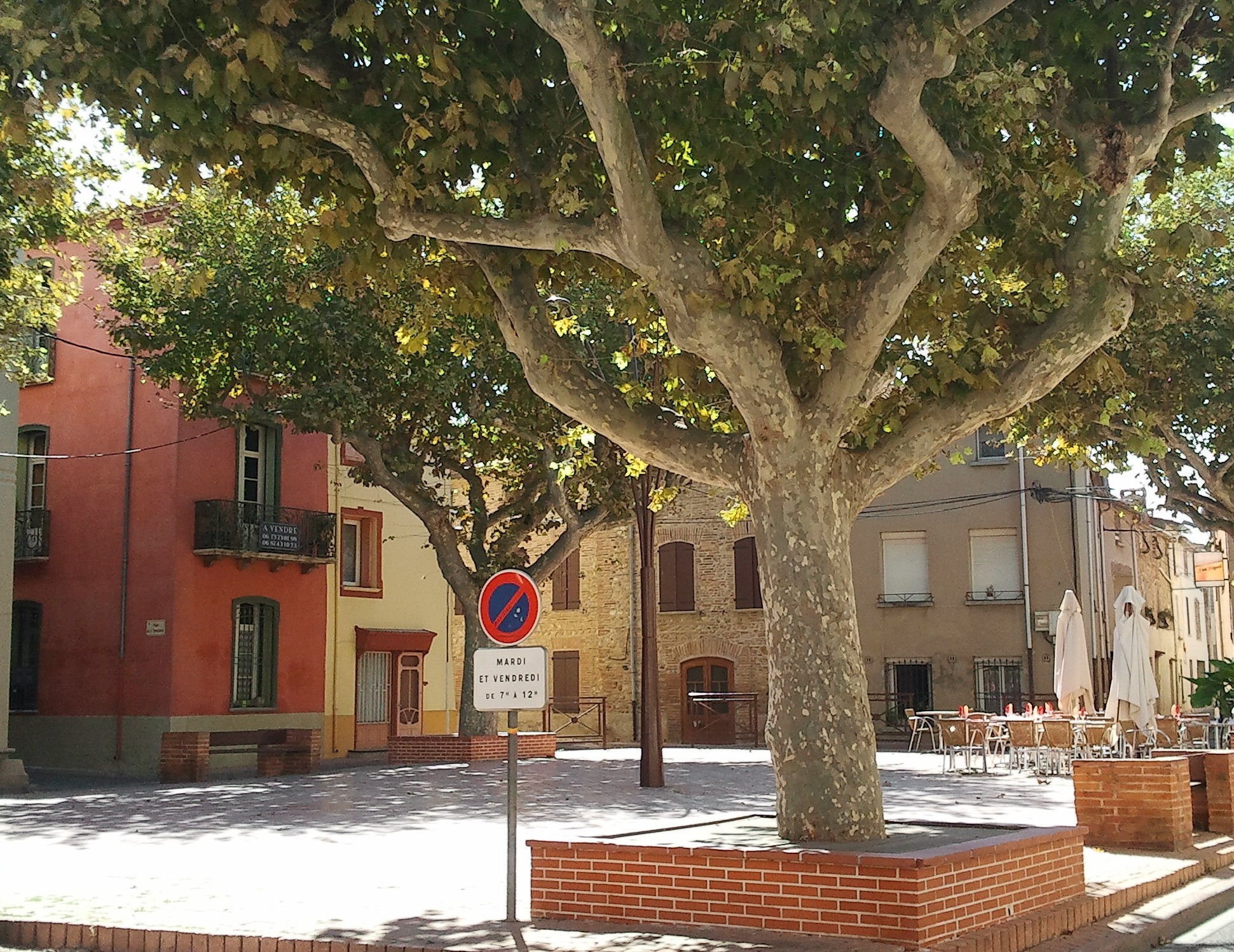
- The Place Louis Blasi, in Torreilles

- Coat of arms
- Location of Torreilles
- Location within France Location within Occitanie
- Coordinates: 42°45′21″N 2°59′41″E
- Country: France
- Region: Occitania
- Department: Pyrénées-Orientales
- Arrondissement: Perpignan
- Canton: La Côte Salanquaise
- Intercommunality: Perpignan Méditerranée Métropole

Government
  - Mayor (2020–2026): Marc Medina
- Area^{1}: 17.14 km^{2} (6.62 sq mi)
- Elevation: 4 m (13 ft)
- Highest elevation: 8 m (26 ft)
- Lowest elevation: 0 m (0 ft)
- Population (2023): 3,753
  - Density: 219.0/km^{2} (567.1/sq mi)
- Time zone: UTC+01:00 (CET)
  - Summer (DST): UTC+02:00 (CEST)
- INSEE/Postal code: 66212 /66440
- ^{1} French Land Register data, which excludes lakes, ponds, glaciers > 1 km^{2} (0.386 sq mi or 247 acres) and river estuaries.

Torreilles (French pronunciation: [tɔʁɛj]; Occitan: Torrelles de la Salanca) is a commune in the Pyrénées-Orientales department in southern France.

== Geography ==
Torreilles is located in the canton of La Côte Salanquaise and in the arrondissement of Perpignan.

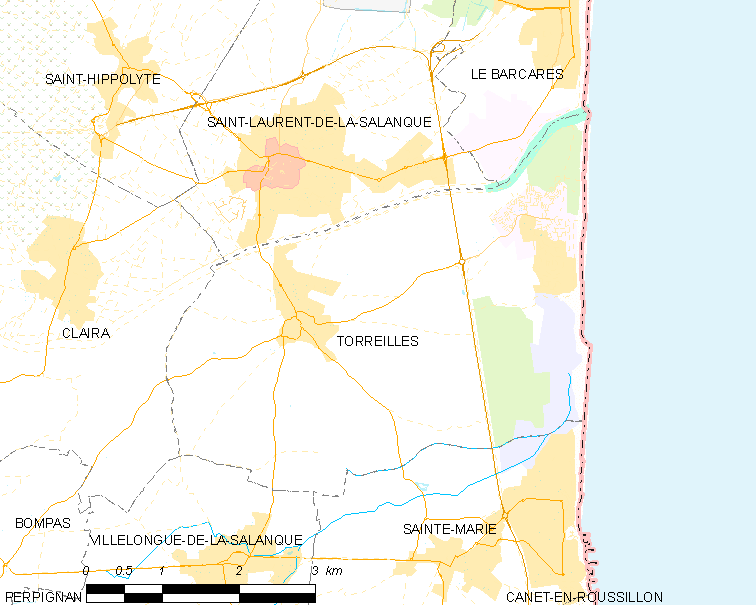
Map of Torreilles and its surrounding communes

== Population ==
Historical population
Year	Pop.	±% p.a.
1968	1,591	—
1975	1,215	−3.78%
1982	1,492	+2.98%
1990	1,775	+2.19%
1999	2,072	+1.73%
2007	3,092	+5.13%
2012	3,326	+1.47%
2017	3,812	+2.77%
2023	3,753	−0.26%
Source: INSEE

== Sites of interest ==
- The pre-Romanesque Saint-Julien-et-Sainte-Basilisse church.

== See also ==
- Communes of the Pyrénées-Orientales department
