= Saint-Laurent-de-la-Salanque =

- Commune
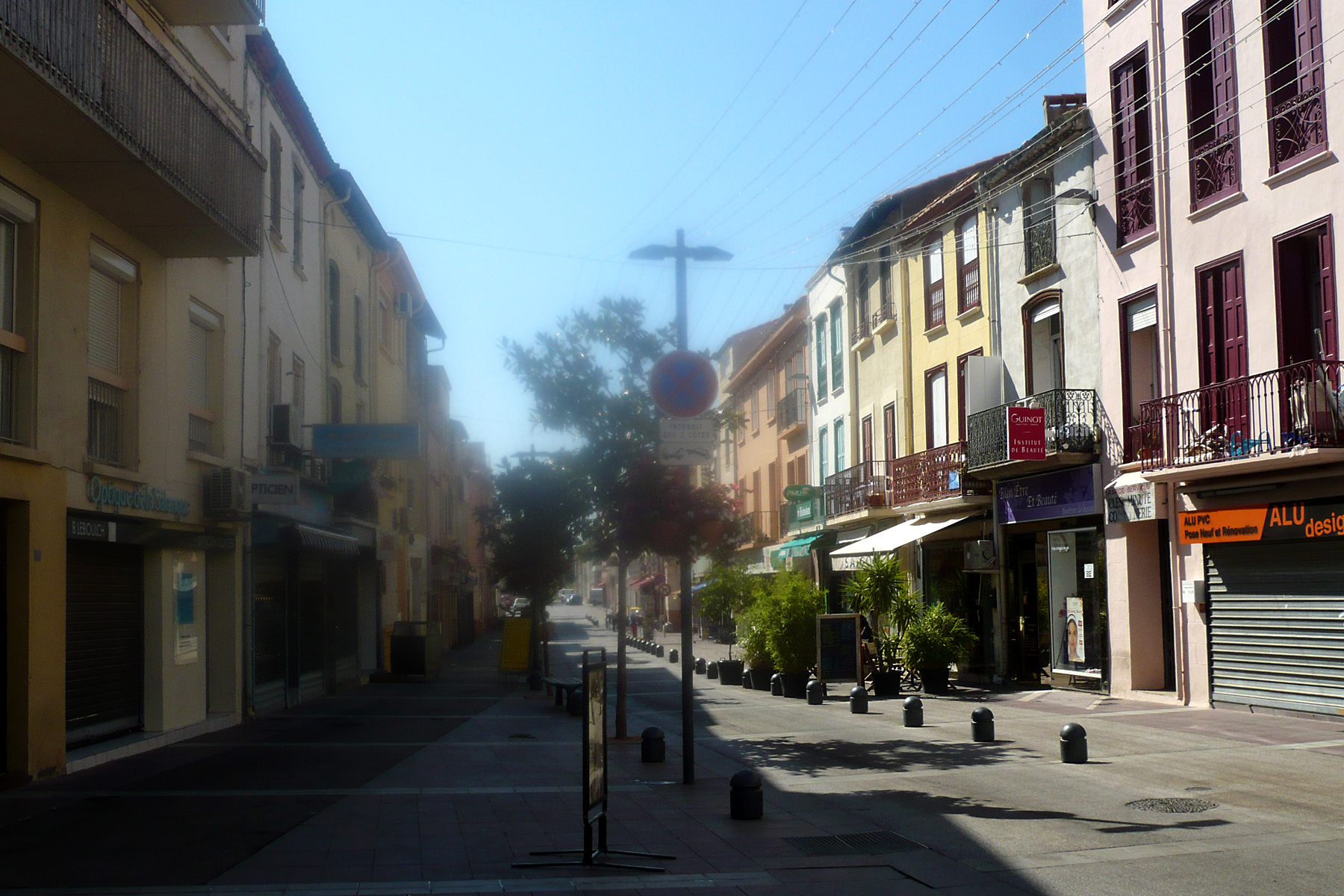
- The Arago street, in Saint-Laurent-de-la-Salanque

- Coat of arms
- Location of Saint-Laurent-de-la-Salanque
- Location within France Location within Occitanie
- Coordinates: 42°46′28″N 2°59′29″E
- Country: France
- Region: Occitania
- Department: Pyrénées-Orientales
- Arrondissement: Perpignan
- Canton: La Côte Salanquaise
- Intercommunality: Perpignan Méditerranée Métropole

Government
  - Mayor (2024–2026): Laurence de Besombes-Singla
- Area^{1}: 12.39 km^{2} (4.78 sq mi)
- Highest elevation: 7 m (23 ft)
- Lowest elevation: 0 m (0 ft)
- Population (2023): 9,898
  - Density: 798.9/km^{2} (2,069/sq mi)
- Demonym: Laurentins
- Time zone: UTC+01:00 (CET)
  - Summer (DST): UTC+02:00 (CEST)
- INSEE/Postal code: 66180 /66250
- ^{1} French Land Register data, which excludes lakes, ponds, glaciers > 1 km^{2} (0.386 sq mi or 247 acres) and river estuaries.

Saint-Laurent-de-la-Salanque (French pronunciation: [sɛ̃ loʁɑ̃ də la salɑ̃k]; Catalan: Sant Llorenç de la Salanca) is a commune in the Pyrénées-Orientales department in southern France.

== Geography ==
Saint-Laurent-de-la-Salanque is located in the canton of La Côte Salanquaise and in the arrondissement of Perpignan.

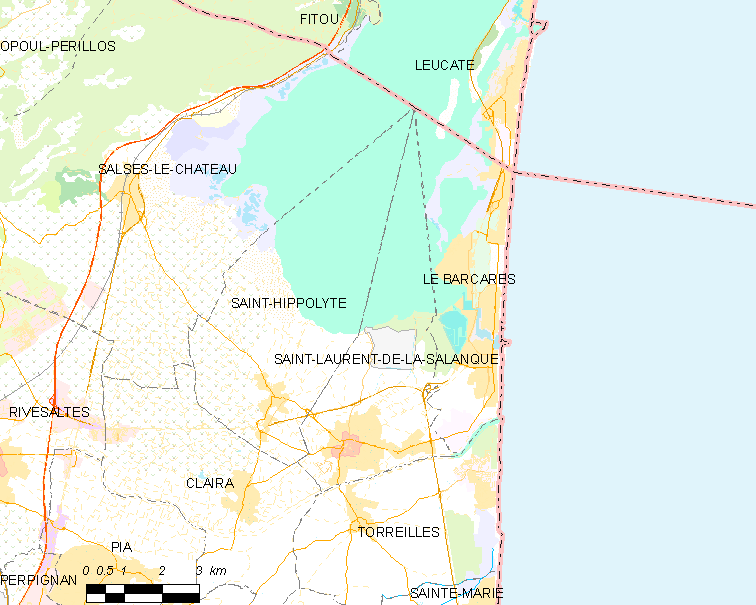
Map of Saint-Laurent-de-la-Salanque and its surrounding communes

== Population ==
Historical population
Year	Pop.	±% p.a.
1968	3,649	—
1975	3,971	+1.22%
1982	4,523	+1.88%
1990	7,186	+5.96%
1999	7,932	+1.10%
2007	8,488	+0.85%
2012	9,433	+2.13%
2017	10,246	+1.67%
2023	9,898	−0.57%
Source: INSEE

== See also ==
- Saint-Laurent-de-la-Salanque explosion
- Communes of the Pyrénées-Orientales department
