= Sporting Olympique Avignon =

French semi-professional rugby league club

SO Avignon

Club information
- Full name: Sporting Olympique Avignon
- Nickname: Bisons
- Founded: 1916; 110 years ago
- Website: Official Site

Current details
- Ground: Parc des Sports Avignon (10,000)
- Chairman: Eric Bissiere
- Coach: Julien Scaramuzza
- Competition: Super XIII
- 2025–26: 5th

Uniforms
Home colours

Sporting Olympique Avignon also known as Avignon XIII or SO Avignon are a semi-professional rugby league team based in Avignon in the south of France. They currently play in the Super XIII. The club was formed in 1916 and they enjoyed their best spell during the 1950s when they lifted the Lord Derby Cup twice and reached two other finals as well as being runners up in the French rugby league championship. The club plays its home matches at the Parc des Sports (Avignon). The current head coach is Julien Scaramuzza.

== History ==
On March 16, 1916 Sporting Olympique Avignon were formed as a rugby and athletics club by Viscount du Tertre and Marius Bremond who would be the club's first president and vice president respectively. After the war and when Rugby League could be played again in France following the Vichy government's banning of the game, SO Avignon decided to join Rugby League under the leadership of head coach and captain Francois Riviere. It was during the 1950s that the club would have its most successful period, they reached their first French rugby league championship final in 1957 while also lifting the Lord Derby Cup in 1955 and 1956 and being runner up in 1958 and 59, during this time they played in front of crowds of more than 10,000 and were well known for playing local youth players.

Since their boom years the club has experienced both highs and lows. They won the Lord Derby Cup in 1982 and again 1989. The youth team also lifted the cup in 1982 and in 1995 they completed a league and cup double under coaches Gerard Faure and Frederic Bissiere. It was during this time that their main stand at their ground caught fire as the club struggled both on and off the field, but thanks to Bernard Gayraud the club survived. In 1998 following their relegation to the Elite Two Championship they caused a major surprise by once again reaching the Lord Derby Cup final but lost to AS Saint-Estève.

In November 2001 the club's president Jean-René Laval had no option but to put the club into liquidation due to its debts, but the club didn't die and under Roger Secula and Christophe Jouffret Avignon was reformed and were accepted into the National Division 2 Regional League, which is the 4th tier. After 2 seasons they won promotion to the National Division 1 League where they stayed for another 2 seasons before being relegated back to the 4th tier. In 2006 they were promoted back to National Division 1. During 2008 the club spent time at the Parc des Sports while their own ground was being refurbished and artificial turf laid. Since their return to the Elite One Championship the club have reached the semi-finals of the play-offs in 2011 and in 2013 they once again won the Lord Derby Cup beating Limoux Grizzlies 38-37

== Colours and Badge ==
SO Avignon play in blue and white hooped shirts with white shorts. The club adopted the Bison, nickname and emblem, during the late 1990s as the trend for British Rugby League clubs at that time was to adopt a moniker. The emblem was so obviously heavily modeled from the Buffalo Sabres NHL ice hockey team's logo at the time. The Bison is a reference to the famous Bison of Vaucluse which was the nickname given to their former player André Savonne a winger with the club during the 1950s.

== Stadium ==
Stade Saint Ruf or to give it its full name Stade Pierre Bazet St Ruf has been the only ground that SO Avignon have used apart from a brief spell in 2008 when they used the Parc des Sports across town. During their heyday in the 1950s more than 10,000 spectators would crowd together along the wooden benches and grassy bank. Adjacent to the ground there used to be a local brewery but that has long gone and has been replaced by a bypass. A new stand was built after a fire destroyed the original wooden stand. In 2008 an artificial pitch was laid. The main stand is now right up to the pitch and has VIP and press facilities along with a bar and a club shop. All the seats are undercover. The club currently use Parc des Sports (Avignon) where it plays its home matches.

== Current squad ==
SO Avignon 2026-27 Squad
Squad - 2026-27 Super XIII season			Coaching staff
Baptiste Avis; Isaak Bakayoko; Yanis Bathias; Naïl Bennabou; Mouadh Bida; Alexi Boudoire; Louis Carré; Paul-Meryl Chevalier-Bonnardel; Yanis Chouchane	Clément Colin; François Dorce-Hantz; Riad El Fath; Valentin Esteve; Houdaifa Feddal; Théo Fouque; Lilian Fusello; Louis Jouffret; Fabien Jullien	Joe Keyes; Saloty Mendy; Nid Ouaarab; Samuel Preel; Corentin Rey; Joris Roussilliat; Mathis Samaï	Head coach: Julien Scaramuzza; Legend: (c) Captain(s); (vc) Vice-captain(s); Updated: 28 October 2026; Source(s): SO Avignon XIII Rugby League Squad

== Players ==
=== Internationals ===
Below is a list of every player to have been capped while at SO Avignon (All France)

- André Beraud 1947-53 (17 apps)
- Jacques Merquey 1951-60 (37 Apps)
- Guy Delaye 1952-55 (5 Apps)
- Roger Rey 1952-61 (24 Apps)
- André Soaps 1953-61 (20 Apps)
- Robert Moulinas 1954-60 (2 Apps)
- Jacques Fabre 1955-59 (9 Apps)
- Jean Rouqueirol 1955-59 (13 Apps)
- Auguste Parent 1956-57 (11 Apps)
- René Jean 1957-59 (6 Apps)
- André Casas 1959-60 (8 Apps)
- Gérard Soaps 1964 (8 Apps)
- André Ferren 1964-69 (6 Apps)
- Marius Frattini 1965-73 (6 Apps)
- Jean-René Ledru 1968-74 (4 Apps)
- Patrick Carrias 1969 (1 Apps)
- Jean-Marie Imbert 1971-78 (20 Apps)
- Serge Gleyzes 1971-77 ( 16 Apps)
- Jacques Garzino 1972-74 (3 Apps)
- Aimé Barcelli 1974 (1 Apps)
- Hervé Bonet 1977 (4 Apps)
- Renaud Guigue 1977-83 (14 Apps)
- Jackie Imbert 1977-83 (7 Apps)
- Bernard Imbert 1981 (1 App)
- Patrick Entat 1986-95 (34 Apps)
- Thierry Buttignol 1989-93 (14 Apps)
- Christian Piredda 1990 (1 App)
- Marc Balleroy 1991 (1 App)
- Patrick Accroue 1994 (2 Apps)
- Lucien Demacedo 1995 (1 App)
- Olivier Arnaud 2015 (3 Apps)

== Honours ==
- Elite One Championship (1): 2017-18
- Lord Derby Cup (5): 1954-55, 1955–56, 1981–82, 1988–89, 2012–13
