= XIII Catalan =

Defunct French rugby league club

Club information
- Founded: 1934; 92 years ago

Current details
- Ground: Stade Jean-Laffon (1934–1962) Stade Gilbert Brutus (1962–2000)
- Competition: French rugby league championship

Uniforms
Home colours

XIII Catalan is a rugby league team from Perpignan in the Pyrénées-Orientales region of southern France. They were founded in 1934, and thus were founding members of the French rugby league championship. In 2000 their senior team merged with nearby neighbours AS Saint Estève to form Union Treiziste Catalane, now better known in the English-speaking world by their Super League identity of Catalans Dragons.

== History ==
In 1888 rugby was introduced to Perpignan by students returning from the Lycée Michelet in Paris. Rugby League arrived in the form of XIII Catalan in 1934 under the guidance of Marcel Laborde so becoming one of the founder members of the first league in France. The club's first chairman Dr Gaston Banet and Roger Ramis the head coach, found many early difficulties the main one being unable to secure a stadium to use. The local rugby club USAP Perpignan successfully blocked their attempts to hire a stadium and for the first month of the season they had to play all away matches. In October 1934 English side Salford RLFC toured the fledgling rugby nation and one of the matches planned was in Perpignan. The club finally found some land to use and after volunteers had demolished a house and marked out a pitch builders then erected a stand. The first ever Rugby League match was then able to take place. The locals saw their side beaten by Salford 16-41, but one of their own scored the historic first try in Aime Bardes. The team's first league match on 7 October also ended in defeat 25-48 at US Villeneuve they finished 6th that season and in the Lord Derby Cup they reached the final but lost to Lyon Villeurbanne.

XIII Catalan lifted their first French rugby league championship in the second season beating Bordeaux XIII in the final. The following season they reached both league and cup finals but lost both. In 1938-39 season they won the cup for the first time beating Toulouse Olympique at their own ground 7-3. The last season before the war saw them win the league again when they beat Pau XIII 20-16 in front of 10,000 fans in Toulouse. During the war the Vichy Government banned Rugby League in France. XIII Catalan had to change their name to XV Catalan and were forced to play rugby union. Before the war ended they changed their name again to Racing Catalan.

After the war the club went back to Rugby League and on 29 December 1948 they beat the mighty touring Australia national rugby league team 20-5 in front of 12,254 fans. They repeated the feat in 1964 winning 15-11 other honours came their way with a title in each decade 57,69 and 79. The 1980s would prove to be the club's most successful period. The era didn't start very well when the club was suspended by the league in 1981 for their players misbehaviour in the suspended 1981 final in Toulouse, but they bounced back and they won the title 5 times, including four consecutive seasons from 81-82. The cup was also won in 1985 to complete a league and cup double they were also runner up in the league 3 times and the cup twice. After a lean patch during the 1990s Bernard Guasch had a vision of a super club in the region and in 2000 he was able to bring together XIII Catalan and local rivals AS Saint Esteve as one club Union Treiziste Catalane. The club continues to exist in locals and youth competitions

== Stadium ==
- Stade Jean Laffon was the club's first home ground, after initially being refused access by USAP Perpignan the local council stepped in and XIII Catalan remained at the ground until they moved in 1962. The club's record crowd came on 29 December 1948 when they beat the touring Australia national rugby league team in front of 12,254 spectators. The grounds all-time record attendance was also for a Rugby League game when it hosted the 1950 French rugby league championship Final between AS Carcassonne and Marseille XIII in front of 18,000 spectators

- Stade Gilbert Brutus was the club's second and final destination when they moved into the ground when it opened in 1962. Known locally as Brutus the ground was named after a famous Catalan rugby player who died under Nazi Gestapo torture in 1944. The ground has hosted many Rugby League internationals it is now the home of Catalans Dragons since 2007.

== Notable players ==
- Pascal Bomati
- Jacques Cabero
- Jean Capdouze
- André Clerc
- Gaston Comes
- Paul Dejean
- Guy Delaunay
- Georges Gauby
- Ivan Grésèque
- Bernard Guasch
- José Guasch
- Guy Laforgue
- Claude Mantoulan
- Francis Mas
- Jep Maso
- François Noguères
- Ian Turner
- Jean Pambrun
- Puig Aubert
- Roger Ramis
- Pierre Saboureau
- Frédéric Trescazes
- Ambroise Ulma
- Pierre Zamora

== Coaches ==
- ??-?? : Martin Serres
- ??-?? : Roger Ramis
- 1939-1953 : Augustin Saltrailles
- 1953-?? : Jep Maso
- ??-1967 : Louis Mazon
- 1967-1969 : René Peytavi
- 1969-?? : Jean Barthe
- ??-1972 : Jean Verges
- 1972-1973 : René Peytavi and André Bourreil
- 1973-1974 : Pierre Estirach
- 1974-1975 : René Peytavi
- 1975-1981 : Francis Mas
- 1981-1986 : Yvon Gourbal
- 1986-1988 : Jean-Jacques Cologni
- 1988-1989 : Francis Mas
- 1989-1991 : Jacques Jorda
- 1991-1993 : Ivan Grésèque
- 1993-1994 : Pierre Zamora and Jean Baco
- 1994-1996 : Jean-Christophe Vergeynst
- 1996-1997 : Jacques Jorda
- 1997-1999 : Jean-Christophe Vergeynst
- 1999-2000 : Jean Jorda and Guy Delaunay
- 2000-2001 : Guy Laforgue and Marc Guasch

== Matches v Australia ==
- 15 January 1938 lost 2-53 : 8,000
- 29 December 1948 won 20-5 : 12,254
- 31 December 1956 lost 14-20 : 7,900
- 1 January 1960 lost 8-32 : 8,198
- 1 January 1964 won 15-11 : 4,524
- 28 January 1967 lost 7-37 : 3,000
- 22 November 1978 lost 15-26 : 2,270
- 12 December 1982 lost 2-53 : 4,000

== Honours ==
- French rugby league championship (11): 1935-36, 1939–40, 1956–57, 1968–69, 1978–79, 1981–82, 1982–83, 1983–84, 1984–85, 1986–87, 1993–94
- Lord Derby Cup (10): 1939, 1945, 1950, 1959, 1969, 1976, 1978, 1980, 1985, 1997

== See also ==
- French Championship
- Lord Derby Cup
- France National Rugby League Team
