= Elite One Championship 2022–2023 =

European rugby league competition

Elite One Championship 2022-23
- League: Elite One Championship
- Duration: 18 rounds + playoffs
- Teams: 10
- Broadcast partners: ViàOccitanie (Available Worldwide Online); Sport en France (United Nations) Club YouTube Channels

2022–23 season
- Champions: Limoux Grizzlies
- League leaders: AS Carcassonne
- Biggest home win: Albi RL 42 – 2 Toulouse Olympique Broncos (16 October 2022)
- Biggest away win: Limoux Grizzlies 38 – 16 Saint-Estève Catalan (9 October 2022)

The 2022–23 Elite One Championship was the 88th season of France's domestic rugby league competition and the 22nd season known as the Elite 1 championship. The competition expanded back to ten teams following the promotion of Baroudeurs de Pia XIII (also known as the Pia Donkeys) from Elite 2 after winning the title in 2021–22.

Each team played 18 matches in the regular season. The top six teams progressed to a three-week final series played during April and May 2023.

== Teams ==
Location of teams in 2022-23 season

Team	Stadium	Location
Albi RL	Stadium Mazicou	Albi, Tarn
SO Avignon	Parc des Sports (Avignon)	Avignon, Vaucluse
AS Carcassonne	Stade Albert Domec	Carcassonne, Aude
FC Lézignan	Stade du Moulin	Lézignan-Corbières, Aude
Limoux Grizzlies	Stade de l'Aiguille	Limoux, Aude
Pia Donkeys	Stade Daniel-Ambert	Pia, Pyrénées-Orientales
Saint-Estève Catalan	Stade Municipal	Perpignan, Pyrénées-Orientales
Saint-Gaudens Bears	Stade Jules Ribet	Saint-Gaudens, Haute-Garonne
Toulouse Olympique Broncos	Stade des Minimes	Toulouse, Haute-Garonne
Villeneuve Leopards	Stade Max Rousie	Villeneuve-sur-Lot, Lot-et-Garonne

== Regular season ==
The regular season started on 2 October 2022 and ended on 14 April 2023. Each team was scheduled to play every other team twice, once at home and the other away making 18 games for each team and a total of 90 games.

=== Table and results ===
Pos	Team	Pld	W	L	PF	PA	PD	BP	Pts	Qualification	CAR	LIM	LEZ	ALB	PIA	STG	AVI	STE	TOU	VIL
1	Carcassonne	18	15	3	557	279	+278	2	47	Semi-finals	—	42–18	18–10	20–12	46–23	38–14	32–8	46–16	30–24	56–8
2	Limoux	18	14	4	629	282	+347	2	44	Semi-finals	0–19	—	56–10	20–24	42–26	50–0	46–14	20–6	62–14	54–0
3	Lézignan	18	13	5	556	354	+202	3	42	Qualifiers	22–6	12–26	—	26–10	52–16	52–12	37–18	44–16	44–16	40–18
4	Albi	18	13	5	502	286	+216	3	42	Qualifiers	20–8	23–22	24–14	—	20–34	38–20	22–12	40–8	42–2	32–8
5	Pia	18	10	8	433	465	−32	1	31	Qualifiers	32–22	6–20	20–27	16–12	—	22–14	20–10	22–37	26–14	34–28
6	Saint-Gaudens	18	7	11	357	542	−185	4	25	Qualifiers	6–24	10–48	30–20	12–52	35–22	—	18–30	36–20	16–14	34–10
7	Avignon	18	6	12	404	468	−64	6	24		18–24	16–23	6–20	16–54	28–14	24–28	—	58–12	32–10	42–6
8	Saint-Estève Catalan	18	6	12	423	579	−156	3	21		26–30	16–38	16–48	22–17	16–36	30–24	54–18	—	40–22	42–20
9	Toulouse Olympique	18	3	15	388	595	−207	8	17		22–54	18–42	28–30	20–26	26–30	30–18	16–28	38–28	—	50–22
10	Villeneuve	18	3	15	281	680	−399	1	10		0–42	26–40	18–48	6–34	16–34	16–30	32–26	22–18	25–24	—

- 3 points for a victory
- 1 point bonus for the losing team if the margin is less than 12
- If two teams have equal points then the separation factor is the point difference in head-to-head matches between the specific teams. If a team has a greater point difference they rank higher on the table. If still tied then overall points difference will be the tie-breaker.

== Finals ==
At the end of the regular season, the top six in the table advanced to the knockout stage. First and second received a bye for the first week of finals as third played sixth (Qualifying Final 1) and fourth played fifth (Qualifying Final 2), with the losers of both matches eliminated. Third-placed Lézignan and fourth-placed Albi advanced to the semi-finals with comfortable wins over Saint-Gaudens (46–12 to Lézignan) and Pia (40–6 to Albi). First-placed Carcassonne then played the winner of Qualifying final 1 and second-placed Limoux then played the winner of Qualifying Final 2. Results went in favour of the higher ranked teams as Carcassonne won 26–16 and Limoux won 36–10. The winners of these two matches met in the Grand Final on 28 May at Parc des Sports et de l'Amitié in Narbonne. Carcassonne were the defending champions having defeated Limoux in the 2021–22 final. However, Limoux won 34–24 to reclaim the title they had last won in the 2016–17 season.

=== Bracket ===
Qualifying Finals
Stade Mazicou, Albi
4	Albi	40
5	Pia	6
Stade du Moulin, Lézignan
3	Lézignan	46
6	Saint Gaudens	12

Semi-Finals
Stade de l'Aiguille, Limoux
1	Carcassonne	26
4	Albi	16
Stade Albert-Domec, Carcassonne
2	Limoux	36
3	Lézignan	10

Final
Parc des Sports et de l'Amitié, Narbonne
1	Carcassonne	24
2	Limoux	34

=== Grand Final ===
Sunday, 28 May 2023
15:30

Carcassonne	24 – 34	Limoux
Tries: Bouregba 2 Canet; Serulevu; Goals: Herrero 4	Report	Tries: Garrouste; Crunel; Torreilles; Saddler; L. Vergniol; B. Vergniol; Goals: Templeman 5

Parc des Sports et de l'Amitié, Narbonne
Attendance: 8,221
Referee: (France) Benjamin Casty
