= Elite One Championship 2021–2022 =

European rugby league competition

Elite One Championship 2021-22
- League: Elite One Championship
- Duration: 16 rounds + playoffs
- Teams: 9
- Broadcast partners: ViàOccitanie (Available Worldwide Online); Sport en France (United Nations) Club YouTube Channels

2021–22 season
- Champions: AS Carcassonne; 2nd Elite One title
- League leaders: Limoux Grizzlies
- Biggest home win: Saint-Estève Catalan 64 – 4 Saint-Gaudens Bears (17 April 2022)
- Biggest away win: Saint-Estève Catalan 52 – 0 Saint-Gaudens Bears (23 January 2022)
- Top point-scorer(s): (France) Baptiste Fabre 166
- Top try-scorer(s): (France) Jordan Flovie 19

The 2021–22 Elite One Championship was the 87th season of France's domestic rugby league competition and the 21st season known as the Elite One Championship. There were nine teams in the league. Each team played 16 matches in the regular season. The top six teams progressed to a three-week final series played throughout May 2022.

AS Carcassonne, who finishing 2nd in the regular season, won their second Elite One Championship and twelfth national title (including French Rugby League Championships) after beating league leaders Limoux Grizzlies 20–16 in the final.

== Teams ==
Location of teams in 2021-22 season

Team	Stadium	Location
Albi RL	Stadium Mazicou	Albi, Tarn
SO Avignon	Parc des Sports (Avignon)	Avignon, Vaucluse
AS Carcassonne	Stade Albert Domec	Carcassonne, Aude
FC Lézignan	Stade du Moulin	Lézignan-Corbières, Aude
Limoux Grizzlies	Stade de l'Aiguille	Limoux, Aude
Saint-Estève Catalan	Stade Municipal	Perpignan, Pyrénées-Orientales
Saint-Gaudens Bears	Stade Jules Ribet	Saint-Gaudens, Haute-Garonne
Toulouse Olympique Broncos	Stade des Minimes	Toulouse, Haute-Garonne
Villeneuve Leopards	Stade Max Rousie	Villeneuve-sur-Lot, Lot-et-Garonne

== Regular season ==
The regular season started on 17 October 2021 and ended on 24 April 2022. Each team played every other team twice, once at home and the other away making 16 games for each team and a total of 72 games.

=== Table and results ===
Pos	Team	Pld	W	L	PF	PA	PD	BP	Pts	Qualification	LIM	CAR	LEZ	ALB	STE	AVI	VIL	TOU	STG
1	Limoux	16	12	4	541	206	+335	4	40	Semi-finals	—	24–18	18–19	34–14	37–24	38–6	44–0	56–0	54–0
2	Carcassonne	16	13	3	577	262	+315	1	40	Semi-finals	38–34	—	31–18	18–12	41–6	44–10	50–18	54–10	30–0 (Note: forfeited by Saint-Gaudens)
3	Lézignan	16	12	4	436	324	+112	2	38	Qualifiers	14–24	30–16	—	34–24	24–22	28–27	28–18	50–20	72–16
4	Albi	16	9	7	456	372	+84	4	31	Qualifiers	12–44	34–16	34–22	—	32–26	24–32	20–28	31–22	58–6
5	Saint-Estève Catalan	16	9	7	444	373	+71	3	30	Qualifiers	20–18	16–54	32–16	32–19	—	32–24	22–16	32–4	64–4
6	Avignon	16	8	8	412	331	+81	5	29	Qualifiers	6–24	18–25	14–18	24–30	42–6	—	46–6	46–0	52–12
7	Villeneuve	16	6	10	296	442	−146	4	22		22–12	18–38	6–16	16–41	8–30	12–19	—	35–22	32–16
8	Toulouse Olympique	16	2	14	240	538	−298	5	11		10–26	4–62	18–34	8–31	34–28	10–22	26–29	—	36–8
9	Saint-Gaudens	16	1	15	164	718	−554	−2	1 (Note: Saint-Gaudens earned 1 bonus point through match results, but were deducted 2 points or failing to fulfil a fixture against Carcassonne (19 December) and 1 point following the incidents against Villeneuve (3 April))		10–60	10–42 (Note: played at Carcassonne)	16–48	10–40	0–52	22–24	12–32	22–20	—

Notes:
- 3 points for a victory
- 1 point bonus for losing team if the margin is less than 12
- If two teams have equal points then the separation factor is the point difference in head-to-head matches between the specific teams. If a team has a greater point difference they rank higher on the table. If still tied then overall points difference will be the tie-breaker.

== Finals Series ==
At the end of the regular season, the top six in the table advanced to the knockout stage. First and second received a bye for the first week of finals as third played sixth (Qualifying Final 1) and fourth played fifth (Qualifying Final 2), with the losers of both matches eliminated. First then played the winner of Qualifying final 1 and second played the winner of Qualifying Final 2. The winners of these two matches played in Grand Final on 22 May at Parc des Sports et de l'Amitié in Narbonne.

=== Bracket ===
Qualifying Finals
Stade Mazicou, Albi
4	Albi	24
5	Saint-Estève Catalan	28(a.e.t)
Stade du Moulin, Lézignan
3	Lézignan	46
6	SO Avignon	12

Semi-Finals
Stade de l'Aiguille, Limoux
1	Limoux	36
5	Saint-Estève Catalan	4
Stade Albert-Domec, Carcassonne
2	Carcassonne	31
3	Lézignan	18

Final
Parc des Sports et de l'Amitié, Narbonne
1	Limoux	16
2	Carcassonne	20

=== Grand Final ===
Sunday, 22 May, 2022
15:30

Limoux	16 – 20	Carcassonne
Tries: Yann Belmaziz (8') 1 Zachary Santo (78') 1 Goals: Patrick Templeman 4 (8', 14' pen, 52' pen, 78' )	1st: 8 – 12; 2nd: 8 – 8	Tries: 1 (28') Maika Serulevu; 1 (38') Alexis Escamilla; 1 (44') Dane Francis; 1 (64') Clément Soubeyras; Goals: 2 Clément Herrero (28', 38'); Sin Bins: (7') Mickael Simon

Parc des Sports et de l'Amitié, Narbonne
Attendance: 8,231
Referee: (France) Benjamin Casty
