= Johnathon Ford =

Cook Islands international rugby league footballer

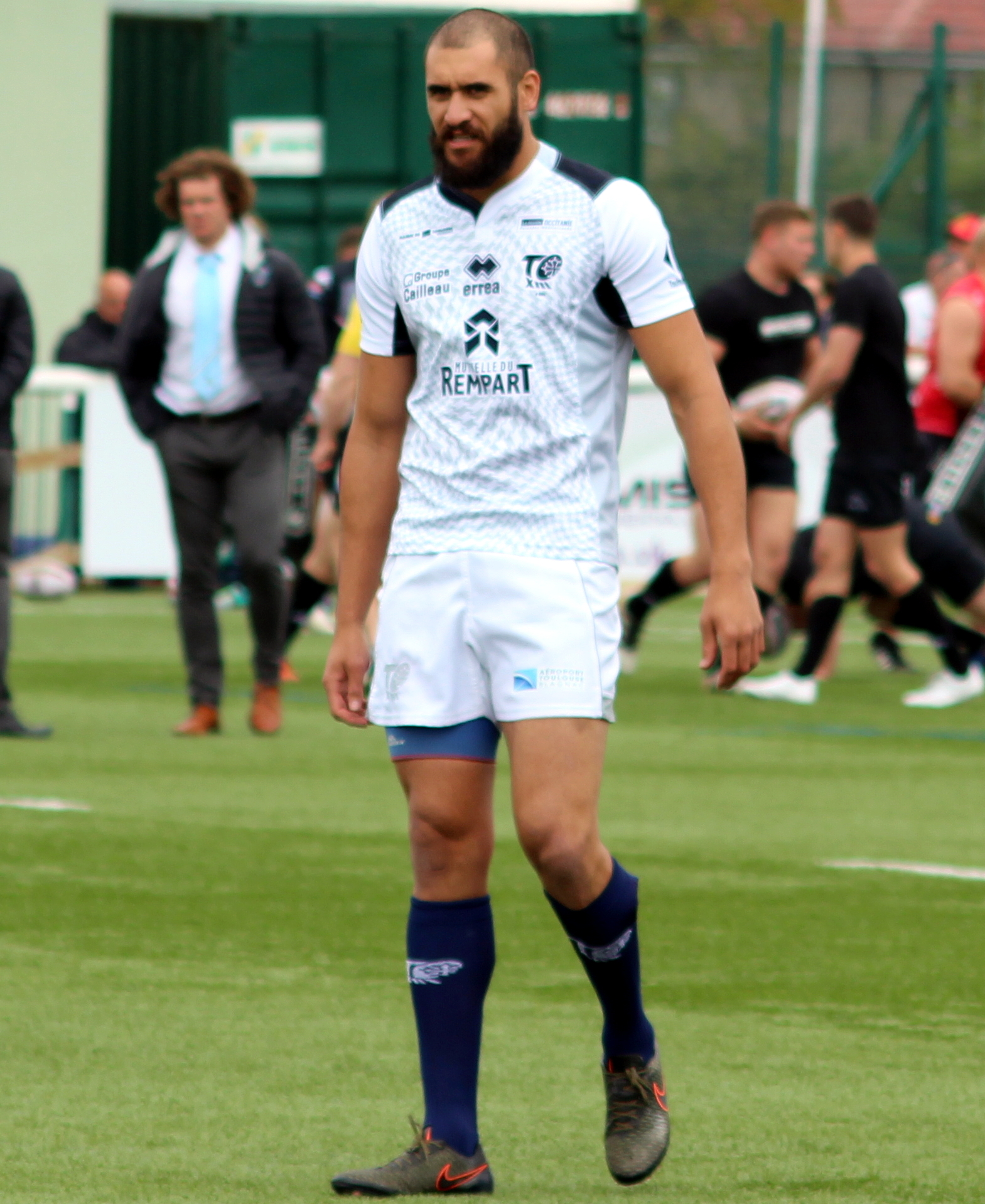

Personal information
- Full name: Johnathon Ford
- Born: 17 August 1989 (age 37) Toronto, New South Wales, Australia
- Height: 194 cm (6 ft 4 in)
- Weight: 99 kg (15 st 8 lb)

Playing information
- Position: Five-eighth, Fullback, Centre, Halfback
Club
Years	Team	Pld	T	G	FG	P
2010–11	Sydney Roosters	3	0	0	0	0
2011–21	Toulouse Olympique	190	53	0	1	121
2022–23	Featherstone Rovers	21	5	0	0	16
2023–	Limoux Grizzlies	0	0	0	0	0
	Total	214	58	0	1	137
Representative
Years	Team	Pld	T	G	FG	P
2009-	Cook Islands	9	1	0	0	4
- Source: As of 7 December 2023

Johnathon Ford (born 17 August 1989) is a Cook Islands international rugby league coach for Villefranche XIII Aveyron in the Super XIII.

He previously played for the Sydney Roosters in the National Rugby League and for Toulouse Olympique and Featherstone Rovers in the RFL Championship and Limoux Grizzlies in the Super XIII.

== Background ==
Ford was born in Toronto, New South Wales, Australia. He is of Cook Island and Irish descent. He is a cousin of former Hull Kingston Rovers player Byron Ford.

Ford played his junior football for the Macquarie Scorpions before being signed by the Newcastle Knights.

== Playing career ==
Ford played for the Knights in the NRL Under-20s league in 2008 and 2009, scoring eight tries and kicking one goal in 30 games, before signing with the Sydney Roosters in 2010. He made his senior debut in Australia's National Rugby League (NRL) for the Roosters in Round 23 of the 2010 season against the Cronulla-Sutherland Sharks. In 2012, Ford signed with Toulouse Olympique in the Elite One Championship. Ford continued playing for the Cook Islands team in the 2013 Rugby League World Cup. In 2014, Ford joined the Wyong Roos in the New South Wales Cup. In 2015, Ford continued to play with the Wyong Roos in the New South Wales Cup, helping them to the New South Wales Cup Grand final.

=== Toulouse Olympique ===
==== 2011-2012 ====
On 26 September 2011, Toulouse announced that they had signed the 22 year old Ford from Sydney Roosters in the NRL. He played three times for the Roosters in the NRL in 2011. Ford's debut for Toulouse was delayed by a week, due to international duty with the Cook Islands. He made his debut for TO on 22 October 2011 in the second game of the French Elite 1 2011/12 season, a 22–14 victory at Stade Arnauné against Pia. This was Toulouse's first season back in the French competition, having played the previous three seasons in the British Championship. Ford played in all of the remaining 18 league and play-off matches for Toulouse that season, scoring four tries.

==== 2018 ====
In October 2018, he signed a contract extension for the 2019 season. It was reported that several Super League sides, including Castleford Tigers were interested in Ford.

==== 2020 ====
In July 2020, Ford extended his contract for a further two years until the end of the 2022 season.

==== 2021 ====
In March, Toulouse announced that Ford would step up from vice-captain to replace Con Mika, who had moved to Villeneuve as captain for the 2021 season. On 10 October 2021, Ford captained Toulouse in their victory over Featherstone in the Million Pound Game which saw him lift the Championship trophy as the club earned promotion to the Super League for the first time in their history.

=== Limoux Grizzlies ===
On 7 December 2023, it was reported that Ford had signed with Limoux Grizzlies in the Elite One Championship.

== International career ==
In 2009, Ford played three games for the Cook Islands in the 2009 Pacific Cup. On 17 October 2015, Ford captained the Cook Islands in their Asia-Pacific Qualifier match against Tonga for the 2017 Rugby League World Cup. Ford was selected in the 24 man Cook Islands team for the 2021 Rugby League World Cup. In the opening round of the 2021 Rugby League World Cup, Ford earned man of the match honours in the Cook Islands 18-12 victory over minnows Wales.
