= Super XIII 2025–2026 =

European rugby league competition

Super XIII 2025–26
- League: Super XIII
- Duration: 22 rounds + playoffs
- Teams: 11
- Broadcast partners: YouTube

2025–26 season
- Champions: Pia XIII
- League leaders: AS Carcassonne

The 2025–26 Super XIII season was the 91st season of France's domestic rugby league competition and the second as the Super XIII having previously been known as the Elite 1 Championship between the 2002–03 and 2023–24 seasons.

In July 2025, the schedule for the 2025–26 Super XIII was released with the eleven teams unchanged from the previous season as Palau XIII Broncos, champions of Elite 2 in 2024–25, remained in the second-tier competition. The season began of 27 September with the eleven teams in the competition each playing 20 matches in the regular season. In May, the top six teams then progressed to the finals series. The Grand Final was played on 6 June 2026 at the Stade Jean-Bouin in Paris.

The defending champions were Albi who defeated Carcassonne 26–16 in the 2024–25 final.

In the 2025–26 final, Pia XIII defeated Carcassonne 31–30 to become the French champions for the first time since the 2012–13 season.

== Teams ==
Location of teams in the 2025–26 season

Team	Stadium	Location
Albi RL	Stade Mazicou	Albi, Tarn
SO Avignon	Parc des Sports (Avignon)	Avignon, Vaucluse
AS Carcassonne	Stade Albert Domec	Carcassonne, Aude
FC Lézignan	Stade du Moulin	Lézignan-Corbières, Aude
Limoux Grizzlies	Stade de l'Aiguille	Limoux, Aude
Pia XIII	Stade Daniel-Ambert	Pia, Pyrénées-Orientales
Saint-Estève Catalan	Stade Municipal	Perpignan, Pyrénées-Orientales
Saint-Gaudens Bears	Stade Jules Ribet	Saint-Gaudens, Haute-Garonne
Toulouse Olympique Broncos	Stade des Minimes	Toulouse, Haute-Garonne
Villefranche XIII Aveyron	Stade Henri Lagarde	Villefranche-de-Rouergue, Aveyron
Villeneuve Leopards	Stade Max Rousie	Villeneuve-sur-Lot, Lot-et-Garonne

== Regular season ==
The regular season started on 27 September 2025 and ended on 10 May 2026. Each team played every other team twice, once at home and the other away making 20 games for each team and a total of 110 games over 22 rounds.

=== Table and results ===
Pos	Team	Pld	W	D	L	PF	PA	PD	BP	Pts	Qualification	CAR	PIA	LIM	ALB	AVI	STE	TOU	LEZ	VFA	VIL	STG
1	Carcassonne	20	18	0	2	646	300	+346	1	55	Semi-finals	—	20–38 (Note: Played 3 May, postponed from 24 January due heavy rain making pitch unplayable)	29–28	44–6	46–6	36–10	24–18	44–0	36–0	34–26 (Note: Played 14 April, postponed from 14 February due heavy rain and strong winds making pitch unplayable)	30–12
2	Pia	20	16	1	3	635	355	+280	2	52	Semi-finals	14–33	—	22–26	14–12 (Note: Played 8 February, postponed from 9 November due to waterlogged pitch)	54–8	38–16	28–6	32–26	36–20	46–10	68–8 (Note: Played 12 April, postponed from 15 February due heavy rain and strong winds making pitch unplayable)
3	Limoux	20	15	0	5	641	357	+284	4	49	Qualifiers	14–18	18–36	—	46–6 (Note: Played 21 March, postponed from 25 January due heavy rain making pitch unplayable)	34–10	26–14	32–16	36–18	54–6	42–12	66–18
4	Albi	20	11	1	8	384	345	+39	4	39	Qualifiers	22–12	14–18	18–16	—	24–12	28–6	7–6	11–30	20–4	6–18	20–12
5	Avignon	20	11	0	9	472	460	+12	5	38	Qualifiers	28–46	18–19	10–17	32–14	—	42–12 (Note: Played 7 March, postponed from 24 January due heavy rain making pitch unplayable)	20–16	34–10	28–22	32–10	22–20
6	Saint-Estève Catalan	20	8	1	11	494	516	−22	7	33	Qualifiers	12–20	30–30	14–26	25–24 (Note: Played 2 May, postponed from 14 February due heavy rain and strong winds making pitch unplayable)	30–32	—	30–22	23–28	38–34	66–6 (Note: Played 7 February, postponed from 24 January due heavy rain making pitch unplayable)	40–20
7	Toulouse	20	8	0	12	438	514	−76	7	31		20–24	4–34	20–18 (Note: Played 8 May, postponed from 31 January due heavy rain making pitch unplayable)	10–50	26–24	10–38	—	18–24	42–10	30–24	44–14
8	Lézignan	20	7	1	12	429	523	−94	5	28		20–34 (Note: Played 30 April, postponed from 21 February due to waterlogged pitch)	14–18	22–38	10–10	10–22	20–24	45–34	—	36–12	32–24	18–33
9	Villefranche	20	7	0	13	373	605	−232	4	25		4–48	10–28	26–34	20–30	30–22	24–18	20–36 (Note: Played 8 March, postponed from 14 February due heavy rain and strong winds making pitch unplayable)	22–20	—	12–10	34–16
10	Villeneuve	20	5	0	15	378	578	−200	9	24		8–34	36–26	16–20	10–28	20–28	32–22	22–30	40–26	24–33	—	18–14
11	Saint-Gaudens	20	2	0	18	337	674	−337	8	14		14–34 (Note: Played 21 March, postponed from 1 February due heavy rain making pitch unplayable)	26–36	26–50	0–34	0–42	18–26	26–30	14–20	29–30	17–12	—

Legend: Blue = home team win; Yellow = draw; Red = away team win.
Notes:
- 3 points for a victory
- 1 point bonus for the losing team if the margin is less than 12
- If two teams have equal points then the separation factor is the point difference in head-to-head matches between the specific teams. If a team has a greater point difference, they rank higher on the table. If still tied then overall points difference will be the tie-breaker.

== Finals ==
At the end of the regular season, the top six teams in the table advanced to the knockout stage. First and second received byes to the semi-finals where they faced the winners of the qualifying finals. Fourth-placed Albi defeated fifth-placed Avignon 11–10 for the right to take on league leaders Carcassonne in the semi-finals, and third-placed Limoux won 40–12 against sixth-placed Saint-Estève Catalan setting up a match against Pia. However, it was the top two teams that progressed to the Grand Final as Carcassonne defeated Albi 35–12 and Pia won 46–18 against Limoux.

The winners of the semi-finals met in the Grand Final on 6 June 2026 at the Stade Jean-Bouin in Paris. In early September 2025, the date and venue of the match were reported in the media along with the information that it would be played as the opening fixture of a doubleheader with the Super League match between Catalans Dragons and Wigan Warriors. (Note: The Super League fixture had been announced in July 2025 to celebrate the 30th anniversary of the competition in which the inaugural match was played in Paris.) At the time the president of the French Rugby League Federation, Dominique Baloup, stated that the feasibility of this happening was still being discussed, before the federation confirmed the match details in mid-December.

Pia were making their first appearance in the final since they won the league, known at the time as Elite 1, in the 2012–13 season. They had then spent several seasons in Elite 2 before winning the 2020–21 final and returning to top division. Carcassonne, runners-up in 2024–25, were making a seventh consecutive appearance in the final having last won the title in the 2023–24 season.

In the final, Carcassonne picked up two yellow cards in the first 15 minutes as Pia dominated the game taking the lead on 20 minutes and extended it to 0-12 a few minutes later. Carcassonne then came back to level the scores at 12-12 at half-time. Pia scored first in the second half to make it 12-18 before two tries from Carcassonne saw them take a six-point lead. A try and two penalties from Pia put them back in the lead, 24-26, before Carcassonne scored again to make it 30-26 with ten minutes remaining. Pia then scored a late try but missed the conversion to leave the scores level at 30-30 after 80 minutes. In extra time, Théo Fages kicked a golden point drop goal from 40 metres to win the game for Pia.

=== Bracket ===
Qualifying Finals
4	Albi	11
5	Avignon	10
3	Limoux	40
6	Saint-Estève Catalan	12

Semi-Finals
1	Carcassonne	35
4	Albi	12
2	Pia	46
3	Limoux	18

Final
1	Carcassonne	30
2	Pia	31

=== Grand Final ===
Saturday, 6 June 2026
16:00

Carcassonne	30–31 (g.p.)	Pia
Tries: Séguier 30', 36'; L. Albert 56'; Herrero 58'; Serulevu 70'; Goals: L. Albert (5/6)		Tries: Pena 22'; Ben-Abdeslem 25'; Castano 51'; D. Huescar 61', 78'; Goals: D. Huescar (5/7); Drop goals: Fages 87'

Stade Jean-Bouin, Paris
Attendance: 12,525
Referee: Geoffrey Poumes
