= Abraham Papali'i =

New Zealand rugby league and union footballer

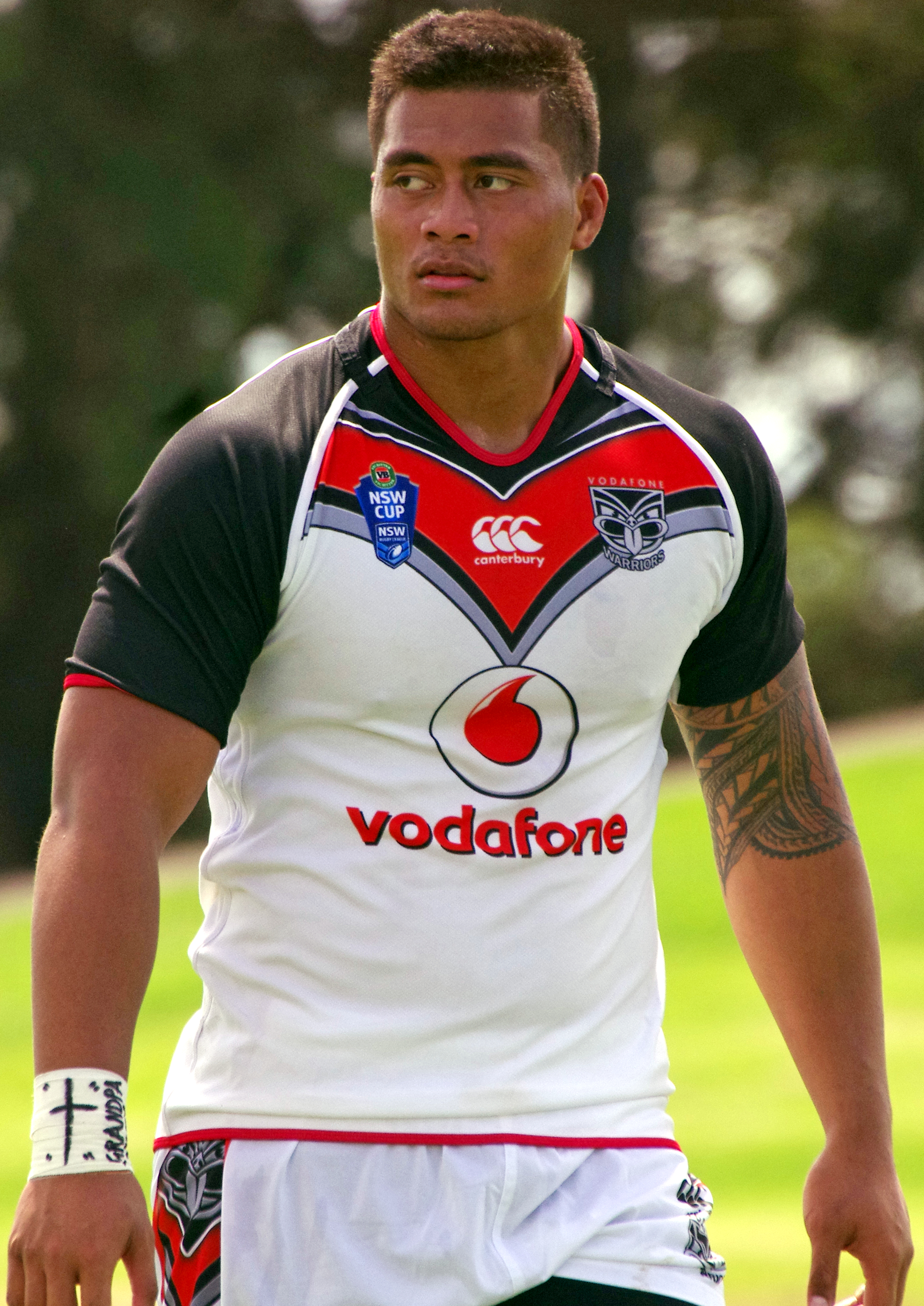
- Born: 20 June 1993 (age 33) Auckland, New Zealand
- Height: 194 cm (6 ft 4 in)
- Weight: 126 kg (19 st 12 lb)
- School: Massey High School

Rugby union career
- Position: Back row
- Current team: CA Brive
Youth career
- Massey
Amateur team(s)
Years	Team	Apps	(Points)
2019	Waitakere		
2019	Greerton Marist		
- Correct as of 10 October 2019
Senior career
Years	Team	Apps	(Points)
2020–2022	Connacht	26	(25)
2022-2023	CA Brive	19	(10)
–	Castres		
- Correct as of 11 September 2022
Provincial / State sides
Years	Team	Apps	(Points)
2019	Bay of Plenty	5	(5)
- Correct as of 11 September 2022
- Rugby league career

Playing information
- Position: Second-row, Lock, Centre
Club
Years	Team	Pld	T	G	FG	P
2014	Glenora Bears	2				16
2015–16	Sydney Roosters	2	0	0	0	0
2016–17	Lézignan Sangliers	13				40
2017–18	Pt Chevalier Pirates	27				42
	Total	44	0	0	0	98
Representative
Years	Team	Pld	T	G	FG	P
2016	NSW Residents	1	0	0	0	0
- As of 10 January 2024

Abraham Papali'i (born 20 June 1993) is a professional rugby player from New Zealand. He has played both rugby union and rugby league professionally. Papali'i currently plays rugby union for Castres Olympique in France as back row. He last played league professionally with French side Lézignan Sangliers in the Elite One Championship, where he covered second-row, lock and centre.

Papali'i's first professional club in either code was the New Zealand Warriors. He featured for the Warriors in the National Youth Competition and NSW Cup, but did not feature for the senior team before leaving for the Sydney Roosters in 2014. Papali'i stayed with the Roosters for two seasons before joining semi-professional side Lézignan. With Lézignan, he contested the final of the 2016–17 Elite One Championship before returning home to New Zealand. In New Zealand, Papali'i began playing amateur rugby union at club level. His form attracted the attention of the Bay of Plenty Steamers, who became his first professional side in the 15-man code. After impressing with the Steamers as they earned promotion, Papali'i was signed by Connacht in July 2020. In 2022 it was announced that he would be leaving Connacht for CA Brive who compete in the French Top 14.

== Early life ==
Papali'i was born and raised in Auckland, New Zealand, to a family of Samoan descent. He attended Massey High School in the city. Growing up, he played junior rugby league for the Glenora Bears and Pt Chevalier Pirates and played rugby union at under-age level for the Massey Rugby Club under the North Harbour Rugby Union. After finishing school, Papali'i was signed by the New Zealand Warriors.

== Playing career ==
=== Youth career ===
On 16 March 2013, Papali'i made his debut for the New Zealand Warriors' National Youth Championship side against the Sydney Roosters. He went on to make a total of 15 appearances in the competition, scoring 4 tries. Papali'i graduated to their New South Wales Cup team in 2014. At this time, he also played for Auckland Rugby League side, Glenora, competing in the 2014 Fox Memorial tournament. In November 2014, it was announced that Papali'i was leaving the Warriiors.

Papali'i signed a two-year contract with the Sydney Roosters ahead of the 2015 season. He did not feature for the first team that year however. Papali'i made his NRL debut for the Roosters from the bench against the South Sydney Rabbitohs on 8 April 2014, in round 6 of the 2016 season. He made one further first team appearance for the side, coming off the bench against Melbourne Storm in a 0–46 defeat.

=== Lézignan Sangliers ===
In November 2016, Papali'i joined Lézignan Sangliers in the premier French rugby league competition, the Elite One Championship, linking up with former NRL and Super League player Ben Pomeroy. He made his debut on 4 December 2016 against Carcassonne. Lézignan finished top of the league in the regular season, but lost the final of the 2016–17 Championship to the Limoux Grizzlies. During his season with the side, Papali'i featured 13 times and scored 40 points.

=== Switch to union ===
After playing for Lézignan for a season, Papali'i returned to New Zealand. He began playing amateur rugby league with his old junior side Pt Chevalier Pirates, playing in Auckland Rugby League's Fox Memorial competition in 2017 and 2018. The Pirates reached the Grand Finals in both seasons, winning in 2018.

In 2019, he decided to switch codes and joined Auckland-based rugby union side Waitakere. Papali'i's form at club level brought him to attention of the Bay of Plenty Steamers, who signed him for the 2019 Mitre 10 Cup. His move to the Steamers also saw him join Baywide Championship side, Greerton Marist, for the remainder of their season. Papali'i made his debut for the Steamers on 11 August 2019 against Otago, scoring a try on his debut. He played five times for the side in the regular season as they topped the Championship Division, but did not feature in the play-offs as the Steamers won the title to earn promotion.

=== Connacht ===
In July 2020, it was announced that Papali'i had signed with Irish provincial side Connacht. His signing came as Connacht's league, the Pro14, was in the midst of an indefinite hiatus due to the coronavirus pandemic. Papali'i made his first appearance for the side in the second game after the restart, an interprovincial derby against Munster. His debut was marred by a red card after 25 minutes, for a high tackle on Lions scrum-half Conor Murray.

Despite a problematic introduction to Pro 14 Rugby, whereby a second Red Card in only his third game back from suspension against Zebre lead to a five week ban. Papali'i's strong carrying game and big hits were making a big impression on fans and management alike. Such that an additional years contract with Connacht was announced on May 4, 2021.
