= Elite One Championship 2004–2005 =

Elite One Championship 2004–05
- League: Elite One Championship
- Teams: 10

2004–05
- Champions: Union Treiziste Catalane
- League leaders: Union Treiziste Catalane

Promotion and relegation
- Promoted from Elite Two Championship: Carpentras, Marseille XIII
- Relegated to Elite Two Championship: Lyon Villeurbanne

The 2004–05 season was the third year of the Elite One Championship, the top-level rugby league French Championship.

This was the second year of operation after the previous (1958–2002) National League 1 had been split into two divisions, Elite One and Elite Two. For the 2004–05 season, the same 10 clubs that competed in the Elite One 2003–04 season returned, as no clubs were relegated to, nor promoted from, Elite Two. At the end of this 2004–05 season, the first relegations and promotions took place, with 11 clubs competing in the Elite One 2005–06 season.

== Table ==
	Team	Pld	W	D	L	PF	PA	PD	Pts
1	Union Treiziste Catalane (C)	18	17	1	0	834	214	+620	53
2	Toulouse Olympique	18	15	0	3	668	310	+358	47
3	Limoux Grizzlies	18	12	0	6	622	323	+299	41
4	Pia Donkeys	18	11	0	7	599	407	+192	36
5	Saint-Gaudens Bears	18	8	2	8	428	443	-15	36
6	Villeneuve Leopards	18	9	1	8	339	452	-113	36
7	Carcassonne	18	6	1	11	440	514	-74	31
8	Villefranche XIII Aveyron	18	4	1	13	304	615	-311	27
9	Lézignan Sangliers	18	4	0	14	324	649	-325	23
10	Lyon Villeurbanne (R)	18	1	0	17	195	826	-631	20

Note: (C) = champions, (R) = relegated

== Grand Final ==
Winners	Score	Runners-up	Venue	Attendance	Ref
Union Treiziste Catalane	66 – 16	Toulouse Olympique XIII	Parc des sports et de l'amitié, Narbonne	5,000	

== See also ==
- Rugby league in France
