= Mathieu Jussaume =

French international rugby league footballer

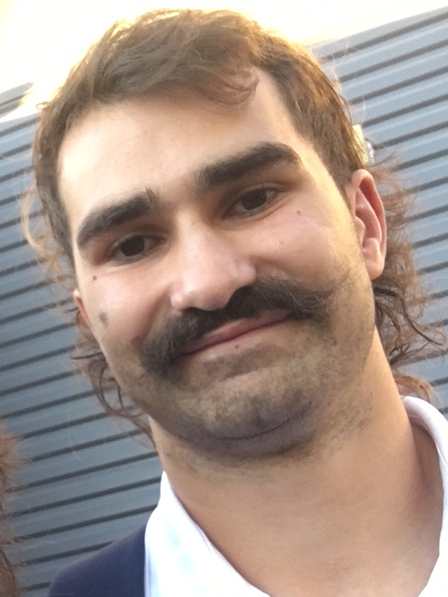

Personal information
- Born: 17 May 1999 (age 27) Toulouse, Haute-Garonne, Occitania, France
- Height: 6 ft 0 in (1.82 m)
- Weight: 14 st 9 lb (93 kg)

Playing information
- Position: Centre, Second-row
Club
| Years | Team | Pld | T | G | FG | P |
|---|---|---|---|---|---|---|
| 2019– | Toulouse Olympique | 137 | 63 | 0 | 0 | 252 |
Representative
| Years | Team | Pld | T | G | FG | P |
| 2019– | France | 4 | 0 | 0 | 0 | 0 |
| 2019 | France 9s | 1 | 0 | 0 | 0 | 0 |
- Source: As of 1 November 2026

Mathieu Jussaume (born 17 May 1999) is a professional rugby league footballer who plays as a centre for Toulouse Olympique in the Super League.

== Background ==
Jussaume discovered rugby league at the age of four with US Plaisance Rugby XIII in Plaisance-du-Touch and remained with them through the junior ranks before turning to rugby union. He was with Stade Toulousain from 2010 to 2015 and throughout his youth, Jussaume continued to play both league and union before finally committing to league with Toulouse Olympique. He is a product of the Toulouse academy system.

== Club career ==
=== Toulouse Olympique Broncos ===
Jussaume graduated from Toulouse's "Centre de Formation" and made his debut for the Toulouse reserve side on 3 December 2017 coming off the bench in the 20–16 win at home to Lézignan. He played in 13 of Toulouse's 18 league games in the Elite 1 2017–2018 season. His only points of the campaign came from a conversion in the 42–28 defeat at Limoux in May.

In 2018/19 Jussaume played 9 times for the Broncos between the start of the Elite 1 2018–2019 season in December and early March. He then joined up with the first team for the 2019 Championship season.

=== Toulouse Olympique ===
Jussaume made his debut for the first team on 24 February 2019 in the 26–24 win at Swinton Lions in the 2019 Championship. He went on to play in 23 of Toulouse's league and play-off matches in 2019, scoring 11 tries. At the end of the season, Jussaume was rewarded with a contract extension for the 2020 season.

In 2020, Jussaume played in only one of Toulouse's five matches, coming off the bench in Doncaster against Sheffield Eagles, before the season was cancelled due to COVID-19. The previous week he had played for the reserves in Elite 1 at Limoux. On 31 August 2020, Toulouse announced that Jussaume had signed a new contract until the end of the 2021 season.

The 2021 season was Jussaume's breakthrough year, playing in all 15 league and play-off games, scoring 14 tries. He scored two tries in the Million Pound Game in a man of the match performance which saw Toulouse promoted to Super League for 2022.

On 26 October 2021, Toulouse announced that Jussaume had signed a new contract that would keep him at the club until the end of the 2024 season. Jussaume played twelve games for Toulouse Olympique in the 2022 Super League season as the club finished bottom of the table and were relegated back the RFL Championship. On 15 October 2023, Jussaume played in Toulouse Olympique's upset loss in the Million Pound Game against the London Broncos.

== Club statistics ==
| Year | Club | Competition | Appearances | Tries | Goals | Drop goals | Points |
|---|---|---|---|---|---|---|---|
| 2017-18 | Toulouse Olympique Broncos | Elite One Championship | 13 | 0 | 1 | 0 | 2 |
| 2018-19 | Toulouse Olympique Broncos | Elite One Championship | 9 | 1 | 0 | 0 | 4 |
| 2019-20 | Toulouse Olympique Broncos | Elite One Championship | 1 | 0 | 0 | 0 | 0 |
| 2019 | Toulouse Olympique | Championship | 23 | 11 | 0 | 0 | 44 |
| 2020 | Toulouse Olympique | Championship | 1 | 0 | 0 | 0 | 0 |
| 2021 | Toulouse Olympique | Championship | 15 | 14 | 0 | 0 | 56 |
| 2022 | Toulouse Olympique | Super League | 12 | 2 | 0 | 0 | 8 |
| 2023 | Toulouse Olympique | Championship | 22 | 7 | 0 | 0 | 28 |
| 2024 | Toulouse Olympique | Championship | 21 | 7 | 0 | 0 | 28 |
| 2025 | Toulouse Olympique | Championship | 22 | 7 | 0 | 0 | 28 |
| 2026 | Toulouse Olympique | Super League | 24 | 16 | 0 | 0 | 64 |
| 2027 | Toulouse Olympique | Super League | | | 0 | 0 | |
| Club career total | | | 160 | 64 | 1 | 0 | 260 |

== International career ==
=== France U19s ===
Jussaume was a member of the France squad that competed in the 2018 U19s European Championship and played in the final, which saw France beat England 26–24 to be crowned European Champions.

=== France 9s ===
The French squad that took part in the 2019 Rugby League World Cup 9s in Sydney, Australia in October 2019 included Jussaume. He played in the 23–6 victory over Wales, but didn't play in either of the two defeats to Lebanon or England.

=== France ===
Jussaume was part of the expanded French squad after the 2019 Rugby League World Cup 9s that played two games Down Under. He made his debut for the senior side on 25 October 2019 scoring a try in the 62–4 defeat to the Junior Kangaroos after coming on from the bench. He missed out on the final match of the tour against the Western Rams.

On 23 October 2021 Jussaume earned his second cap in Perpignan in the 10-30 test match defeat to England.

On 1 October 2026 he was named in the 2026 France World Cup squad

== International statistics ==
| Year | Team | Competition | Appearances | Tries | Goals | Drop goals | Points |
|---|---|---|---|---|---|---|---|
| 2019 | France 9s | Rugby League World Cup 9s | 1 | 0 | 0 | 0 | 0 |
| 2019 | France | Australian Tour | 1 | 1 | 0 | 0 | 4 |
| 2021 | France | Test match | 1 | 0 | 0 | 0 | 0 |
| 2026 | France | 2026 Rugby League World Cup | 2 | 0 | 0 | 0 | 0 |
| International career total | | | 5 | 1 | 0 | 0 | 4 |
