= Joseph Guiraud =

France international rugby league footballer (1929–2020)

Personal information
- Born: 14 January 1929 Espéraza, Aude, Occitania, France
- Died: 17 April 2020 (aged 91) Carcassonne, France

Playing information
- Height: 5 ft 8 in (1.73 m)
- Weight: 11 st 0 lb (70 kg)
- Position: Centre, Halfback, Five-eighth
Club
Years	Team	Pld	T	G	FG	P
19??–??	Lézignan
19??–??	Carpentras
19??–??	Montpellier
19??–66	Toulouse
1966–72	Limoux
	Total	0	0	0	0	0
Representative
Years	Team	Pld	T	G	FG	P
1956–61	France	7	2	0	0	20

Coaching information
Club
Years	Team	Gms	W	D	L	W%
1966–72	Limoux
- Source: As of 12 February 2021

Joseph Guiraud (Espéraza, 14 January 1929 – Carcassonne, 17 April 2020) was a French rugby league player who played as centre, halfback and five-eights and later, coach.

== Career ==
He played for several clubs during his career. debuting for Lézignan, later, joining Carpentras and Montpellier before joining Toulouse for a French Championship in 1965, finally ending his career for Limoux with a second French Championship title in 1968. Thanks to his club-level performances, he represented France between 1956 and 1961, taking part at the 1960 Rugby League World Cup.

== Personal life ==
Outside the pitch, he worked as wine-grower.

== Honours ==
=== As player ===
- Team honours:
  - French Champion in 1965 (Toulouse) and 1968 (Limoux)
  - Runner-up at the French Championship: 1964 (Toulouse)

=== As coach ===
- Team honours:
  - French Champion in 1968 (Limoux)
