= Elite One Championship 2006–2007 =

Elite One Championship 2006/07
- League: Elite One Championship
- Teams: 11
- Broadcast partners: (France) Canal+

2006–2007
- Champions: Pia XIII
- League leaders: Pia XIII
- Runners-up: Lézignan Sangliers

Promotion and relegation
- Promoted from Elite Two Championship: RC Albi
- Relegated to Elite Two Championship: Villefranche XIII Aveyron

The 2006/07 season was the fourth year of the Elite One Championship, the top-level rugby league French Championship. The season commenced on 6 October 2006. Like the previous season, there were 11 teams with one team missing a round each week. A total of 22 rounds were played, with the last finishing on 18 April 2007, before the top four Pia XIII, Toulouse Olympique, Lézignan Sangliers and Saint-Gaudens Bears progressed to the play-offs. Pia XIII beat Lézignan Sangliers in the Grand Final 20-16 which was played at Colomiers. That win completed a double for Pia XIII as they had already lifted the Lord Derby Cup beating AS Carcassonne 30–14. Lyon Villeurbanne XIII finished bottom, finishing with 23 points but it was Villefranche XIII Aveyron who'd finished 9th who were relegated to the Elite Two Championship, replaced by RC Albi.

== Table ==
	Team	Pld	W	D	L	PF	PA	PD	Pts
1	Pia XIII (C)	20	17	0	3	838	344	+494	54
2	Toulouse Olympique	20	15	1	4	643	333	+310	51
3	Lézignan Sangliers	20	13	1	6	535	357	+178	47
4	Saint-Gaudens Bears	20	13	1	6	591	424	+167	47
5	AS Carcassonne	20	12	1	7	614	333	+281	45
6	Limoux Grizzlies	20	10	1	9	490	455	35	41
7	Union Treiziste Catalane	20	10	1	9	518	498	+20	41
8	Villeneuve Leopards	20	8	1	11	480	477	+3	37
9	Villefranche XIII Aveyron (R)	20	4	2	14	471	633	-162	30
10	RC Carpentras XIII	20	2	0	18	282	865	-583	24
11	Lyon Villeurbanne XIII	20	1	1	18	251	994	-743	23

Points win=3: draw=2: loss=1:

Note: (C) = champions, (R) = relegated

== Play-offs ==
=== Semi-finals ===
- Semi-Final - Pia XIII - Saint-Gaudens Bears
- Semi-Final - Toulouse Olympique - Lézignan Sangliers

== Grand Final ==
Winners	Score	Runners-up	Venue	Attendance	Ref
Baroudeurs de Pia XIII	20 – 16	FC Lézignan	Stade Michel-Bendichou, Colomiers	7,882	

== See also ==
- Rugby league in France
