= Elite One Championship 2005–2006 =

Elite One Championship 2005–06
- League: Elite One Championship
- Teams: 11

2005–06
- Champions: Pia Donkeys
- League leaders: Pia Donkeys

Promotion and relegation
- Relegated to Elite Two Championship: Marseille XIII

The 2005–06 season was the third year of the Elite One Championship, the top-level rugby league French Championship.

== Table ==
	Team	Pld	W	D	L	PF	PA	PD	Pts
1	Pia Donkeys (C)	20	17	1	2	795	381	+414	55
2	Toulouse Olympique	20	16	0	4	830	268	+562	52
3	Limoux Grizzlies	20	14	1	5	644	390	+254	49
4	Union Treiziste Catalane	20	13	1	6	714	458	+256	47
5	Saint-Gaudens Bears	20	13	0	7	766	463	+303	46
6	AS Carcassonne	20	10	1	9	504	544	-40	41
7	Villeneuve Leopards	20	10	0	10	620	427	+193	40
8	Villefranche XIII Aveyron	20	6	0	14	449	632	-183	32
9	Lézignan Sangliers	20	4	1	15	394	652	-258	29
10	RC Carpentras XIII	20	0	0	20	229	1222	-993	20
11	Marseille XIII (R)	20	0	0	0	0	0	0	0

Note: (C) = champions, (R) = relegated

== Grand Final ==
Winners	Score	Runners-up	Venue	Attendance	Ref
Baroudeurs de Pia XIII	21 – 18	Toulouse Olympique XIII	Stade des Minimes, Toulouse	5,462	

== See also ==
- Rugby league in France
