= Elite One Championship 2003–2004 =

Elite One Championship II (2003–04)
- League: Elite One Championship
- Teams: 10

2003–04
- Champions: Saint Gaudens Bears
- League leaders: Union Treiziste Catalane

Promotion and relegation
- Promoted from Elite Two Championship: none
- Relegated to Elite Two Championship: none

The 2003–04 season was second year of the Elite One Championship, the top-level rugby league French Championship.

The league was previously called the National League 1 from 1958 to 2002. In 2002, the top-level French Rugby League Championship was split into two divisions, Elite One and Elite Two. For the 2003–04 season, ten clubs competed in the Elite One Championship, and no clubs were relegated to, nor promoted from, Elite Two at season's end – the same ten teams would compete again in the Elite One 2004–05 season.

== Table ==
	Team	Pld	W	D	L	PF	PA	PD	Pts
1	Union Treiziste Catalane	18	15	0	3	669	280	+389	48
2	Saint-Gaudens Bears (C)	18	14	0	4	493	286	+207	46
3	Toulouse Olympique	18	12	0	6	602	286	+299	42
4	Pia Donkeys	18	11	0	7	575	374	+201	40
5	Carcassonne	18	11	0	7	467	365	+102	40
6	Limoux Grizzlies	18	9	0	9	510	417	93	36
7	Villeneuve Leopards	18	6	0	12	344	424	-80	34
8	Lézignan Sangliers	18	6	0	12	322	409	-87	30
9	Villefranche XIII Aveyron	18	2	0	16	220	732	-512	22
10	Lyon Villeurbanne	18	2	0	16	210	839	-629	22

Note: (C) = champions, (R) = relegated

== Grand Final ==
Winners	Score	Runners-up	Venue	Attendance	Ref
Saint-Gaudens Bears	14 – 10	Union Treiziste Catalane	Stade Gilbert Brutus, Perpignan	7,500	

== See also ==
- Rugby league in France
