= Elite One Championship 2017–2018 =

Elite One Championship 2017-2018
- League: Elite One Championship
- Teams: 10

2017–18

The 2017-18 Elite One Championship was the 83rd season of France's domestic rugby league competition and the 17th season known as the Elite One championship. The defending champions were Limoux who defeated Lézignan 24–22 in the Grand Final of the 2016–2017 season. The championship was won by SO Avignon who finished fourth in the regular season and defeated Limoux in the Grand Final.

== Regular season ==
The regular season started on 2 December 2017 and ended on 3 June 2018. Each team played every other team twice, once at home and the other away and an additional match the "Magic Weekend" which took place in round 14 making 19 games for each team and a total of 95 games.

=== Table and results ===
Pos	Team	Pld	W	L	PF	PA	PD	BP	Pts	Qualification	STE	LIM	LEZ	AVI	CAR	ALB	STG	PAL	VIL	TOU
1	Saint-Estève Catalan	19	15	4	674	270	+404	4	49	Semi-finals	—	22–8	54–6	26–16	40–6	30–16	54–12	66–10	70–4	28–14
2	Limoux	19	14	5	565	369	+196	3	45	Semi-finals	16–28	—	16–26	32–16	30–0	22–18	58–6	40–18	37–12	42–28
3	Lézignan	19	11	8	509	424	+85	7	40	Qualifiers	28–24	15–20	—	22–25	31–6	18–30	14–13	30–24	52–6	68–16
4	Avignon	19	11	8	540	417	+123	5	38	Qualifiers	30–34	58–14	40–18	—	28–20	38–36	32–22	36–32	24–4	64–6
5	Carcassonne	19	10	9	416	408	+8	5	35	Qualifiers	17–4	6–10	16–14	12–27	—	10–34	28–6	30–22	29–6	48–22
6	Albi	19	8	11	485	402	+83	9	33	Qualifiers	24–14	16–24	24–25	29–10	24–37	—	22–16	22–28	36–10	28–4
7	Saint-Gaudens	19	7	12	354	509	−155	8	29		10–34	14–32	30–32	16–10	25–24	12–8	—	14–15	18–24	26–18
8	Palau Broncos	19	7	12	422	603	−181	6	27		8–28	34–42	22–48	12–42	30–26	10–42	16–15	—	32–18	35–34
9	Villeneuve	19	7	12	354	574	−220	3	24		23–22	10–42	18–16	31–20	24–29	26–22	26–27	18–33	—	28–23
10	Toulouse Olympique	19	5	14	370	713	−343	5	20		8–62	12–60	20–16	17–10	12–42	38–35	36–40	20–15	10–40	—

- 3 points for a victory
- 1 point bonus for losing team if the margin is less than 12
- If two teams have equal points then the separation factor is point difference. If a team has a greater point difference they rank higher on the table. If still tied then head-to-head matches will be the tie-breaker.

Magic Weekend: Round 14 (21–22 April)
Team 1	Score	Team 2
Albi	19–30	Carcassonne
Limoux	20–30	Lézignan
Palau Broncos	26–32	Toulouse
Saint-Estève Catalan	34–14	Avignon
Saint-Gaudens	32–26	Villeneuve

== Finals ==
At the end of the regular season, the top six in the table advanced to the knockout stage. First and second received a bye for the first week of finals as third played sixth (Qualifying Final 1) and fourth played fifth (Qualifying Final 2), with the losers of both matches eliminated.

=== Bracket ===
Elimination-finals
4	SO Avignon	18
5	AS Carcassonne	16
3	Lézignan Sangliers	28
6	Albi	24

Semi-finals
1	Saint-Esteve XIII Catalan	23 (Note: Saint-Esteve XIII Catalan were barred from playing in the finals after fielding ineligible players)
4	SO Avignon	16
1	Limoux Grizzlies	30
3	Lézignan Sangliers	10

Grand Final
1	Limoux Grizzlies	28
4	SO Avignon	34

=== Grand Final ===
1 July 2018

SO Avignon	34–28	Limoux Grizzlies
	Report

Stade Municipal d'Albi, Albi
Attendance: 5,000
