= Elite One Championship 2011–2012 =

French rugby championship

Elite One Championship 2011-2012
- League: Elite One Championship
- Teams: 10

2011/12
- Champions: AS Carcassonne
- League leaders: Pia XIII

Promotion and relegation
- Relegated to Elite Two Championship: Montpellier Red Devils

Season 2011/12 in the French Elite One Championship, the top level rugby league competition in France saw 10 teams play home and away matches before the top six progressed to the play-offs. The season ran from September to May. There were two new clubs, Toulouse Olympique returned to the competition after they had participated in the British rugby league second tier RFL Championship and RC Lescure-Arthes XIII who had won promotion from the French second tier Elite Two Championship. Pia XIII finished top after the regular season and went on to reach the grand final, but they were beaten by AS Carcassonne in that final at Narbonne 26-20. The same two teams had already met in the Lord Derby Cup final with AS Carcassonne enjoying a league and cup double after winning 14-12. At the other end of the table Montpellier Red Devils opted for relegation thus saving new boys RC Lescure-Arthes XIII who had finished bottom.

== Table ==
Pos	Team	Pld	W	D	L	PF	PA	Pts
1	Pia XIII	18	14	0	4	602	317	46
2	AS Carcassonne	18	13	0	5	528	345	44
3	SO Avignon	18	13	0	5	562	400	44
4	Lézignan Sangliers	18	12	0	6	521	318	42
5	Toulouse Olympique	18	12	0	6	442	352	42
6	Saint-Esteve XIII Catalan	18	11	0	7	583	409	40
7	Villeneuve Leopards	18	6	0	12	369	443	30
8	Limoux Grizzlies	18	5	0	13	430	480	28
9	Montpellier Red Devils	18	2	0	16	265	712	22
10	RC Lescure-Arthes XIII	18	2	0	16	250	758	18*

Points win=3: draw=2: loss=1:

*(deducted 4 pts)

== Play-offs ==
Week 1

- Quarter-Final - Lézignan Sangliers 28-4 Toulouse Olympique
- Quarter-Final - SO Avignon 36-12 Saint-Esteve XIII Catalan

Week 2

- Semi-Final - Pia XIII 28-20 Lézignan Sangliers
- Semi-Final - AS Carcassonne 31-30 SO Avignon

== Grand Final ==
Winners	Score	Runners-up	Venue	Attendance
AS Carcassonne	26 – 20	Baroudeurs de Pia XIII	Parc des sports et de l'amitié, Narbonne	8,980

== See also ==
- Rugby league in France
- French Rugby League Championship
