= Elite One Championship 2008–2009 =

Elite One Championship
- League: Elite One Championship
- Teams: 10

2008–2009
- Champions: Lézignan Sangliers
- League leaders: Limoux Grizzlies
- Runners-up: Limoux Grizzlies

Promotion and relegation
- Relegated to Elite Two Championship: Lyon Villeurbanne XIII

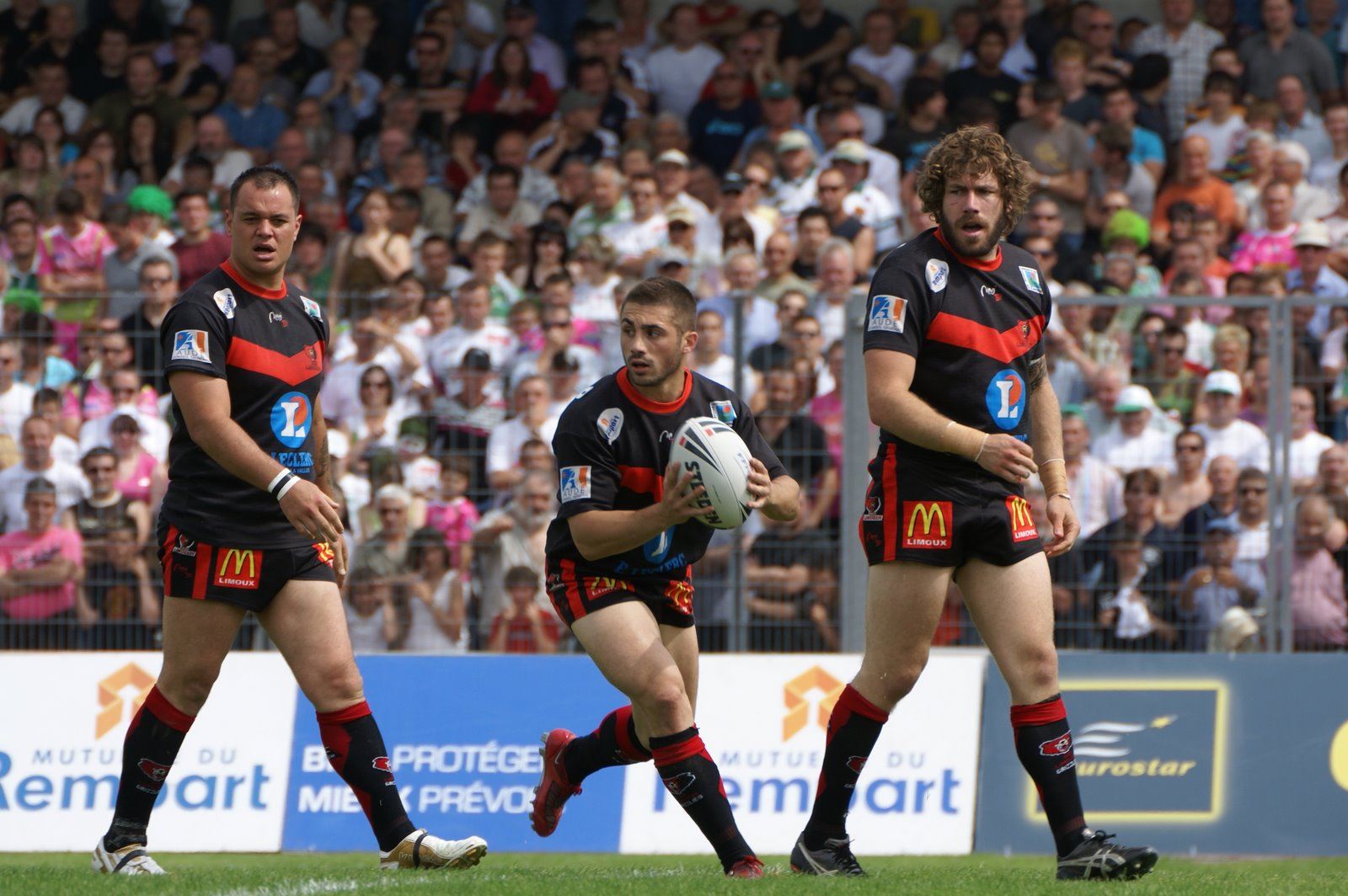
Limoux Grizzlies players competing in the final

The season 2008/09 was the sixth year under the title Elite One Championship the top level rugby league competition in France. The season ran from October to May. Ten clubs competed for the title playing 20 rounds in the league before the top five progressed to the end of season play-offs. UTC who had finished 5th were not allowed to take their place in the play-offs, their place was given to RC Carpentras XIII. Pia XIII were beaten by Lézignan Sangliers in a repeat of the previous two finals, and AS Carcassonne knocked out Carpentras. At the second stage Lezignan shocked league leaders Limoux Grizzlies 20-18 away to reach the final in the other game Carcassonne eliminated Pia. In the elimination final Limoux thrashed Carcassonne 41-16. The final was held at Carcassonne's Stade Albert Domec and defending champions Lézignan Sangliers beat Limoux Grizzlies 40-32. At the other end of the table Lyon Villeurbanne XIII were relegated. In the Lord Derby cup final AS Carcassonne beat Limoux Grizzlies to complete a winless campaign for Limoux.

== Table ==
	Team	Pld	W	D	L	PF	PA	PD	Pts
1	Limoux Grizzlies	20	15	1	4	665	384	+281	51
2	AS Carcassonne	20	14	0	6	691	431	+260	48
3	Pia XIII	20	13	1	6	796	498	+388	47
4	Lézignan Sangliers	20	13	0	7	698	466	+232	46
5	Union Treiziste Catalane	20	10	0	10	571	514	+57	40
6	RC Carpentras XIII	20	10	0	10	526	516	+10	40
7	Villeneuve Leopards	20	10	0	10	517	536	-19	40
8	SO Avignon	20	7	1	12	472	681	-209	35
9	Saint-Gaudens Bears	20	3	1	16	324	713	-389	27
10	Lyon Villeurbanne XIII	20	3	0	17	259	870	-611	26

Points :win=3 :draw=2 :loss=1:

== Play-offs ==
Week 1

- Quarter-Final - AS Carcassonne 62-4 RC Carpentras XIII
- Quarter-Final - Pia XIII 12-50 Lézignan Sangliers

Week 2

- Elimination Semi-Final - AS Carcassonne 25-18 Pia XIII
- Major Semi-Final - Limoux Grizzlies 18-20 Lézignan Sangliers

Week 3

- Preliminary Final - Limoux Grizzlies 41-16 AS Carcassonne

== Grand Final ==
Winners	Score	Runners-up	Venue	Attendance	Ref
FC Lézignan	40 – 32	Limoux Grizzlies	Stade Albert Domec, Carcassonne	11,263	
