= Elite One Championship 2016–2017 =

Elite One Championship
- League: Elite One Championship
- Duration: 20 rounds followed by play-offs
- Teams: 10
- Broadcast partners: (France) beIN Sport

2016–2017
- Champions: Limoux Grizzlies
- League leaders: Lézignan Sangliers
- Runners-up: Lézignan Sangliers
- Biggest home win: Lézignan Sangliers 76-0 Palau XIII Broncos
- Biggest away win: Toulouse Olympique Broncos 4-82 Lézignan Sangliers

In 2016–2017 ten clubs competed for the title. The season ran from October 2016 to June 2017. The first round of matches took place at the Stade Gilbert Brutus in Perpignan where the ten clubs played over the weekend called "Magic Weekend 1" this was followed by 18 rounds home and away matches before a second Magic Weekend as the last round of games. The top six clubs then progressed into the end of season play-offs to determine the champions. The league saw the return of Saint-Gaudens Bears following their promotion.

== Table ==
| | Team | Pld | W | D | L | B | PF | PA | PD | Pts |
|---|---|---|---|---|---|---|---|---|---|---|
| 1 | Lézignan Sangliers | 20 | 19 | 0 | 1 | 1 | 839 | 368 | +471 | 58 |
| 2 | Limoux Grizzlies | 20 | 15 | 0 | 5 | 4 | 653 | 407 | +246 | 49 |
| 3 | Saint-Esteve XIII Catalan | 20 | 13 | 0 | 7 | 6 | 634 | 398 | +236 | 45 |
| 4 | AS Carcassonne | 20 | 13 | 0 | 7 | 5 | 643 | 430 | +213 | 44 |
| 5 | SO Avignon | 20 | 13 | 0 | 7 | 3 | 567 | 445 | +122 | 42 |
| 6 | Albi RL | 20 | 9 | 0 | 11 | 4 | 511 | 616 | -105 | 31 |
| 7 | Saint-Gaudens Bears | 20 | 8 | 0 | 12 | 3 | 433 | 622 | -189 | 27 |
| 8 | Villeneuve Leopards | 20 | 5 | 0 | 15 | 7 | 372 | 534 | -162 | 22 |
| 9 | Palau XIII Broncos | 20 | 4 | 0 | 16 | 3 | 343 | 694 | -351 | 15 |
| 10 | Toulouse Olympique Broncos | 20 | 1 | 0 | 19 | 4 | 326 | 807 | -481 | 7 |

Points : victory : 3, defeat with less than 12 points : 1 (point bonus), defeat with more than 12 points : 0.

== Results ==
| Teams | Albi | Avignon | Carcass | Lezig | Limoux | Palau | StEsXIII | StGaud | ToulB | Villen |
|---|---|---|---|---|---|---|---|---|---|---|
| Albi RL | x | 14-9 | 31-22 | 10-22 | 12-42 | 44-32 | 20-36 | 50-20 | 32-20 | 31-20 |
| SO Avignon | 24-22 | x | 15-16 | 20-16 | 16-33 | 46-10 | 19-16 | 38-20 | 36-18 | 38-26 |
| AS Carcassonne | 53-12 | 42-16 | x | 18-28 | 33-32 | 48-6 | 28-20 | 38-26 | 46-22 | 32-16 |
| Lézignan Sangliers | 56-20 | 50-38 | 16-14 | x | 12-10 | 76-0 | 28-26 | 72-26 | 60-6 | 44-6 |
| Limoux Grizzlies | 32-22 | 40-20 | 34-28 | 24-54 | x | 36-20 | 50-22 | 60-10 | 46-10 | 28-10 |
| Palau XIII Broncos | 18-44 | 22-28 | 6-74 | 14-36 | 18-20 | x | 8-24 | 32-8 | 40-12 | 20-14 |
| Saint-Esteve XIII Catalan | 44-20 | 44-18 | 39-26 | 30-31 | 14-10 | 20-4 | x | 10-20 | 62-8 | 48-10 |
| Saint-Gaudens Bears | 40-22 | 4-26 | 10-28 | 18-52 | 20-32 | 30-16 | 12-40 | x | 31-24 | 10-12 |
| Toulouse Olympique Broncos | 10-23 | 12-40 | 14-32 | 4-82 | 18-32 | 44-14 | 22-50 | 22-44 | x | 28-40 |
| Villeneuve Leopards | 28-32 | 8-12 | 12-25 | 22-36 | 14-16 | 30-10 | 10-28 | 24-26 | 32-6 | x |

- Magic Weekend 1 (Round 1)
- Toulouse Olympique Broncos 10-16 Saint-Gaudens Bears
- Albi RL 22-24 Villeneuve Leopards
- Lézignan Sangliers 30-26 Saint-Esteve XIII Catalan
- Palau XIII Broncos 4-44 SO Avignon
- AS Carcassonne 16-40 Limoux Grizzlies
- Magic Weekend 2 (Round 20)
- Villeneuve Leopards 12-42 Saint-Gaudens Bears
- SO Avignon 64-28 Albi RL
- Lézignan Sangliers 38-36 Limoux Grizzlies
- Palau XIII Broncos 49-16 Toulouse Olympique Broncos
- AS Carcassonne 24-35 Saint-Esteve XIII Catalan

== Grand Final ==
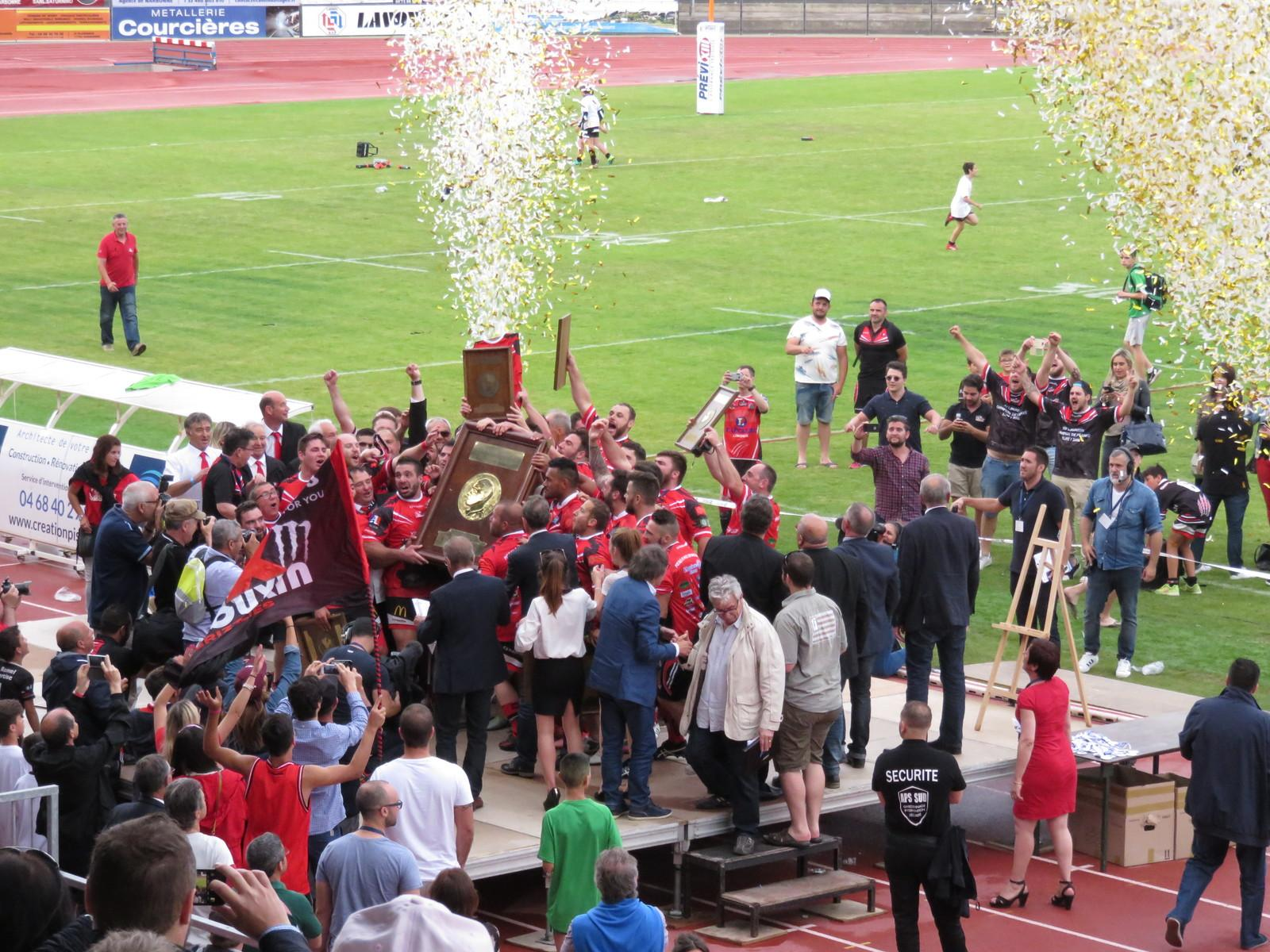
Limoux celebrating their victory

| Limoux | 24–22 | Lézignan Sangliers |

Parc des sports, Narbonne
Attendance: est. 10,000
