= Super XIII =

French top level rugby league competition

- Current season, competition or edition: Super XIII 2026–2027
- Sport: Rugby league
- Founded: 2002; 24 years ago
- No. of teams: 11
- Country: France
- Most recent champion: Pia XIII (2025-26)
- Most titles: FC Lézignan (5)
- Broadcasters: viàOccitanie, Sport en France
- Level on pyramid: 1
- Relegation to: Elite 2
- Domestic cup: Lord Derby Cup
- Website: Official site

Super XIII is the top level, semi-professional rugby league competition in France, sanctioned by the French Rugby League Federation. The season runs from September to April, which is in contrast to the majority of other major domestic rugby league competitions worldwide. The clubs play each other home and away then they enter into a play-off series culminating with a Grand Final. The competition was founded in 2002, as the Elite One Championship and renamed as Super XIII at the start of the 2024–2025 season. The competition is the continuation of the French Rugby League Championship, which began in 1934.

== History ==
Logo for Elite 1 before the competition was renamed in 2024

Prior to the creation of Elite 1, the French Rugby League Championship was the top tier of the French rugby league system.

The competition was founded in 2002, as the Elite One Championship, following the splitting of the French Rugby League Championship into two divisions. The format stayed the same with teams playing each other home and away, before a play-off series would determine the Champions. The club finishing bottom would not be automatically relegated, it would be dependent on whether the club finishing top of Elite Two Championship either wanted to be promoted or their facilities were up to standard.

The 2002–03 season, the first of the Elite 1 championship, saw the defending champions of France, Villeneuve, up against Saint-Gaudens in the final. Villeneuve had won the league championship in 2000–01 and completed a league/cup double in 2001–2002. Having already won the Lord Derby Cup in 2003, they achieved a second consecutive double with a 31–18 win to retain the Max Rousié Trophy. Their opponents, Saint-Gaudens, had not won a championship since the early 1990s, but the following season they defeated Union Treiziste Catalane 14–10 to claim the title and in doing so prevent UTC from claiming the double. That achievement would come for UTC the following year as they went undefeated throughout the 2004–05 season and beat Toulouse 66–16 in the championship final. The following two seasons saw Pia claim consecutive doubles. In the 2007–08 season Lézignan began a run of four consecutive title wins becoming only the second club, after Catalan in the early 1980s, to achieve this feat.

The competition was renamed as Super XIII at the start of the 2024–2025 season. In September 2024, the president of the French Rugby League Federation, Dominique Baloup, gave an interview published in La Dépêche in which he discussed plans to increase the number of teams in the Super XIII and the possibility of moving the season to run between February and September from 2026.

== Teams for 2026–27 season ==
Location of teams participating in Super XIII in the 2026–27 season (Note: All teams are located inside Occitania except Sporting Olympique Avignon and Villeneuve XIII RLLG which are just located outside the region.)

Super XIII
Team	Stadium	Location
Albi RL	Stade Mazicou	Albi, Tarn
SO Avignon	Parc des Sports (Avignon)	Avignon, Vaucluse
AS Carcassonne	Stade Albert Domec	Carcassonne, Aude
FC Lézignan	Stade du Moulin	Lézignan-Corbières, Aude
XIII limouxin	Stade de l'Aiguille	Limoux, Aude
XIII Baroudeur de Pia	Stade Daniel-Ambert	Pia, Pyrénées-Orientales
Saint-Estève XIII Catalan	Stade Municipal	Perpignan, Pyrénées-Orientales
RC Saint-Gaudens	Stade Jules Ribet	Saint-Gaudens, Haute-Garonne
Toulouse Olympique Elite	Stade des Minimes	Toulouse, Haute-Garonne
Villefranche XIII Aveyron	Stade Henri Lagarde	Villefranche-de-Rouergue, Aveyron
Villeneuve XIII RL	Stade Max Rousie	Villeneuve-sur-Lot, Lot-et-Garonne

== Results ==
Year	Winners	Score	Runners-up	Venue	Attendance
2002–03	Villeneuve Leopards	31 – 18	Saint-Gaudens Bears	Parc des sports et de l'amitié, Narbonne	8,000
2003–04	Saint-Gaudens Bears	14 – 10	Union Treiziste Catalane	Stade Gilbert Brutus, Perpignan	7,500
2004–05	Union Treiziste Catalane	66 – 16	Toulouse Olympique XIII	Parc des sports et de l'amitié, Narbonne	5,000
2005–06	Pia XIII	21 – 18	Toulouse Olympique XIII	Stade des Minimes, Toulouse	5,462
2006–07	Pia XIII	20 – 16	FC Lézignan	Stade Michel-Bendichou, Colomiers	7,882
2007–08	FC Lézignan	26 – 16	Pia XIII	Stade de la Mediterranee, Béziers	8,233
2008–09	FC Lézignan	40 – 32	Limoux Grizzlies	Stade Albert Domec, Carcassonne	11,263
2009–10	FC Lézignan	32 – 22	Pia XIII	Altrad Stadium, Montpellier	6,612
2010–11	FC Lézignan	17 – 12	Limoux Grizzlies	Parc des sports et de l'amitié, Narbonne	11,874
2011–12	AS Carcassonne	26 – 20	Pia XIII	Parc des sports et de l'amitié, Narbonne	8,980
2012–13	Pia XIII	33 – 26	Saint-Estève Catalan	Stade Gilbert Brutus, Perpignan	6,732
2013–14	Toulouse Olympique XIII	38 – 12	FC Lézignan	Stade Gilbert Brutus, Perpignan	7,245
2014–15	Toulouse Olympique XIII	20 – 12	AS Carcassonne	Stade Michel-Bendichou, Colomiers	5,800
2015–16	Limoux Grizzlies	26 – 24	AS Carcassonne	Stadium municipal d'Albi, Albi	5,420
2016–17	Limoux Grizzlies	24 – 22	FC Lézignan	Parc des sports et de l'amitié, Narbonne	8,270
2017–18	Sporting Olympique Avignon	30 – 28	Limoux Grizzlies	Stadium municipal d’Albi, Albi	5,000
2018–19	Saint-Estève Catalan	32 – 24	AS Carcassonne	Stadium municipal d’Albi, Albi	1,500
2019–20	Competition abandoned due to the COVID-19 pandemic in France				
2020–21	FC Lézignan	16 – 12	AS Carcassonne	Stade Ernest-Wallon, Toulouse	3,200
2021–22	AS Carcassonne	20 – 16	Limoux Grizzlies	Parc des Sports et de l'Amitié, Narbonne	8,231
2022–23	Limoux Grizzlies	34 – 24	AS Carcassonne	Parc des Sports et de l'Amitié, Narbonne	8,221
2023–24	AS Carcassonne	8 – 6	Albi RL	Parc des Sports et de l'Amitié, Narbonne	5,578
2024–25	Albi RL	26 – 16	AS Carcassonne	Parc des Sports et de l'Amitié, Narbonne	5,191
2025–26	Pia XIII	31 – 30	AS Carcassonne	Stade Jean-Bouin, Paris	12,525

=== Winners ===
#	Club	No.	Year(s)
1	Lézignan Sangliers	5	2007–08, 2008–09, 2009–10, 2010–11, 2020–21
2	Pia XIII	4	2005–06, 2006–07, 2012–13, 2025–26
3	AS Carcassonne	3	2011–12, 2021–22, 2023–24
3	Limoux Grizzlies	3	2015–16, 2016–17, 2022–23
5	Toulouse Olympique	2	2013–14, 2014–15
6	Villeneuve Leopards	1	2002–03
6	Saint-Gaudens Bears	1	2003–04
6	Union Treiziste Catalane	1	2004–05
6	SO Avignon	1	2017–18
6	Saint-Esteve XIII Catalan	1	2018–19
6	Albi RL	1	2024–25

== Media coverage ==
=== Television ===
Unlike, for instance, the BBC, France Television didn't offer any program to the French public about Rugby League.

Sport en France cover the Championship across their television platforms nationwide. Coverage includes the match of the week and one match from each week of the playoffs including the Grand Final.

From 2020, some Elite 1 games are televised by a local channel ViàOccitanie; this is a free-to-air channel in the South of France but they are also available on the internet and via the triple play internet devices. Therefore, they offer, indirectly, free nationwide coverage of the domestic championship.

Presently, French clubs have to fund the broadcast of their own games or to televise their own matches themselves via the social networks or YouTube.

=== Radio ===
Radio Marseillette, a local Southern radio, has rugby league debate and news every Saturday from 10:00 to 12:00. They also have commentary on some Elite League games.

=== Press ===
The French national mainstream media has, for a long time, been disinterested to follow the game, occasionally, some articles about the sport are published in newspapers such as Le Monde, Le Figaro or the national Sport newspaper L'Équipe.

Nevertheless, there is undoubtedly a French specificity: the Weekly Rugby Union magazine Midi Olympique has a one-page section devoted to Rugby League. However, only two local newspapers genuinely cover the game; L'Indépendant ( based in the South of France) and la Dépêche du Midi (based in the South west of the country).

The British Rugby League press cover this championship; for example magazines like Rugby Leaguer & League Express offer a weekly report of the games. In Australia, the monthly publication Rugby League Review offer a few columns about the games as well.

== Gallery ==
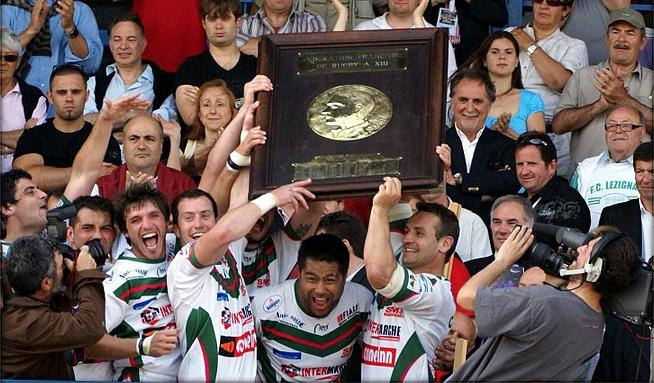
FC Lézignan XIII winning in 2008–2009

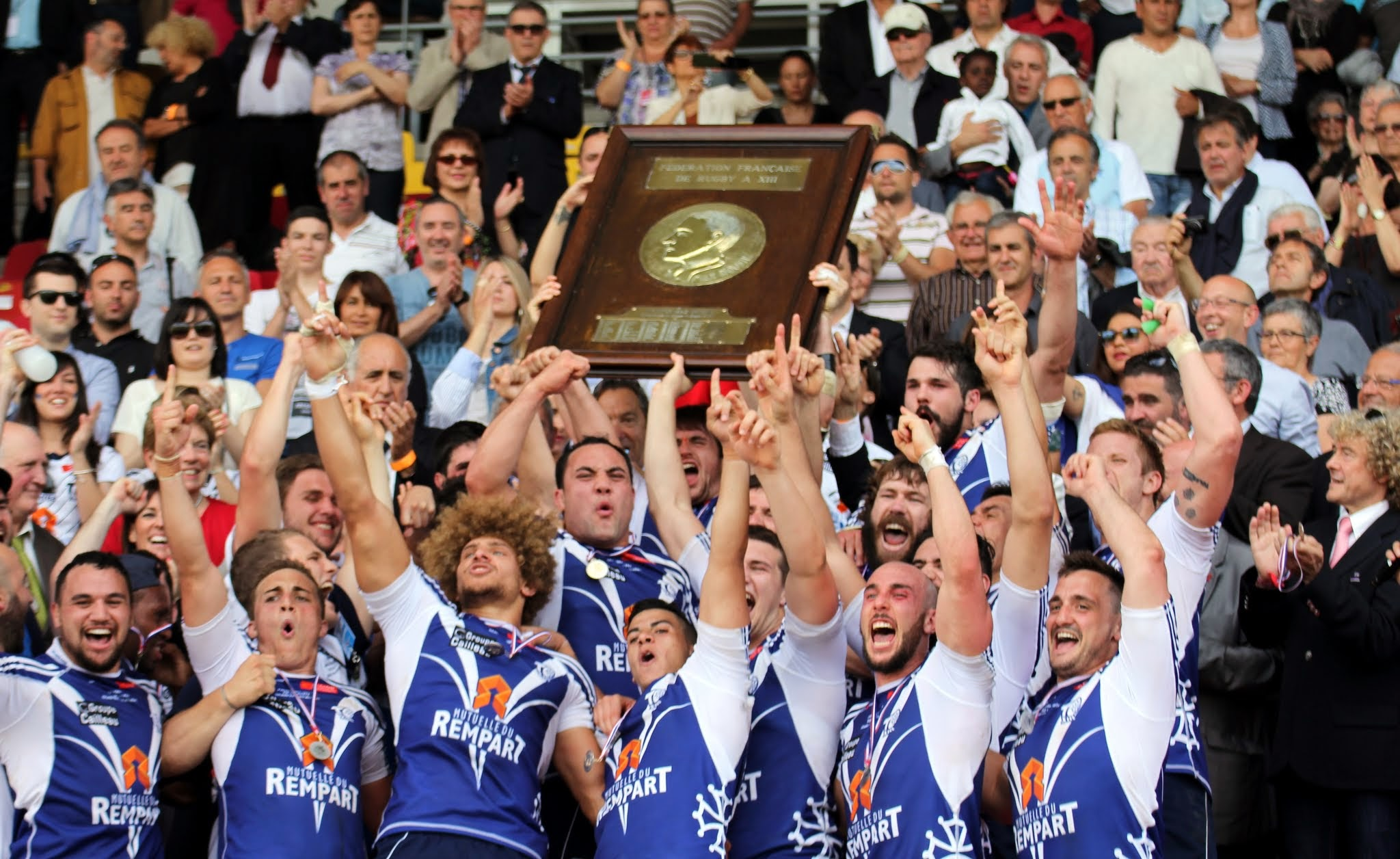
Toulouse Olympique winning in 2013–2014

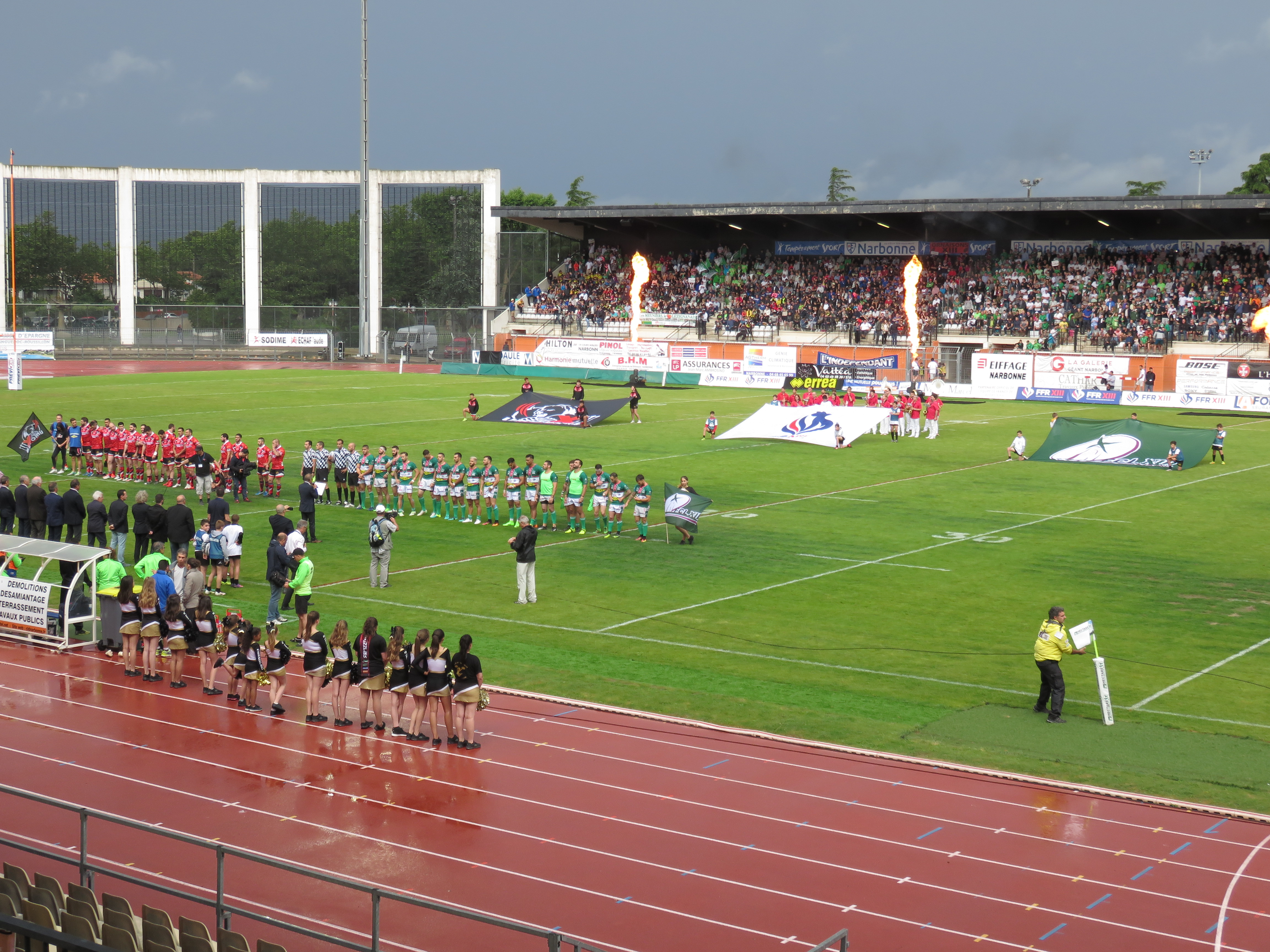
Teams line up ahead of the 2016–2017 season Grand Final

== See also ==
- Rugby league in France
- Coupe de France Lord Derby
- Wheelchair Elite 1
