= Toulouse Olympique =

Rugby league club based in Toulouse, France

Club information
- Full name: Toulouse Olympique XIII
- Nickname: Rams
- Colours: Blue and white
- Founded: 1937; 89 years ago
- Website: to13.com

Current details
- Ground: Stade Ernest-Wallon (19,500)
- CEO: Cedric Garcia
- Chairman: Bernard Sarrazain
- Coach: Sylvain Houles
- Captain: Anthony Marion
- Competition: Super League
- 2026: 8th
- Current season

Uniforms
Home colours	Away colours

Toulouse Olympique or TO XIII is a professional rugby league club in Toulouse, south-west France. Founded in 1937, two years after the French Rugby League Federation, the club is a six-time winner of the French Rugby League Championship.

The club played in the Rugby Football League's Championship competition in 2009, 2010 and 2011. It left the English structure at the end of the 2011 season and instead focused on the Elite One Championship from 2011/12 season. In 2016 Olympique again joined the RFL system, this time in League 1, the third tier of English rugby league, being promoted to the Championship at the end of that season. In 2012, Toulouse acquired fellow Toulouse side, Toulouse Jules-Julien Broncos XIII to act as their reserve side in Elite 2. The side was re-branded as Toulouse Olympique Broncos and moved up to Elite 1 when Olympique re-joined the English competition.

The club's historic stadium is the stade des Minimes (also known as the stade Arnauné). But following the failure (due to opposition from the neighbourhood) of an expansion project that was to increase the stadium's capacity to 10,000 seats, in 2020 the club reached an agreement with rugby union club Stade Toulousain to use the stade Ernest Wallon for the home matches of its professional team.

On 15 April 2021 Didier Lacroix, President of Stade Toulousain rugby union club and Bernard Sarrazain, President of Toulouse Olympique signed an agreement for Toulouse Olympique to play home games at the Stade Ernest-Wallon until the end of the 2029 season.

== History ==
Toulouse hosted the first ever French rugby league Lord Derby Cup final in 1935 when Lyon Villeurbanne beat XIII Catalan at the Stade des Minimes. The first rugby league club in the city were Gallia de Toulouse who started the 1935–36 season but lasted only two matches before dropping down to the amateur level of the newly introduced sport. Toulouse Olympique were formed in 1937 by Jean Galia and played their first league match on 24 October 1937 losing 14–44 at home against RC Albi at their new home the Arnaune Stadium now called the Stade des Minimes. The club finished 8th in that debut season under coach Jean Galia. In their second season, 1938–39, they reached the cup final losing 3–7 against XIII Catalan and finished 5th in the league. The club's last match before the war was against Villefranche de Lauragais winning 62–5. During the war years, like other rugby league clubs in France, the club were forced to play rugby union following the ban on rugby league by the Vichy regime in France.

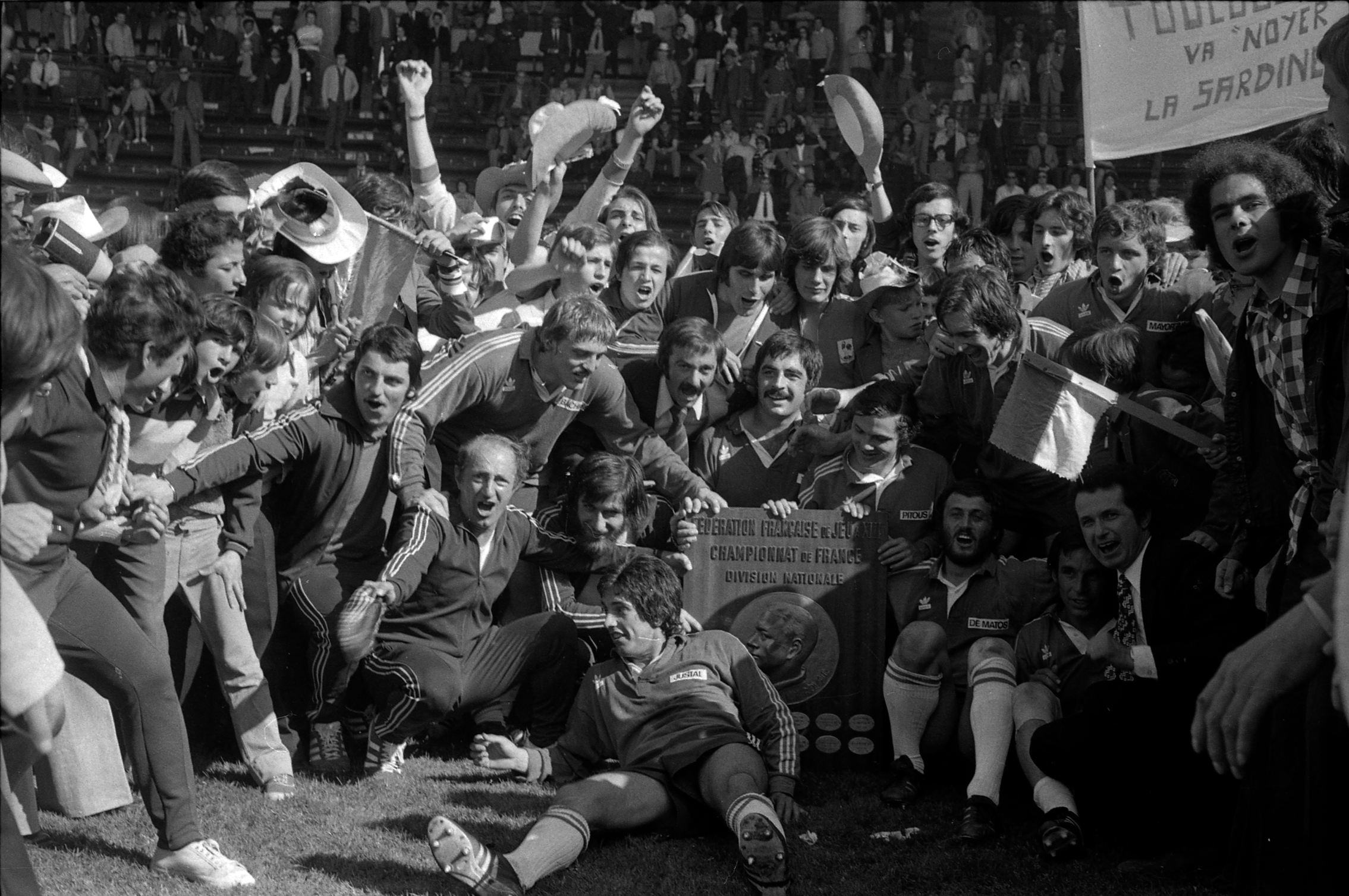
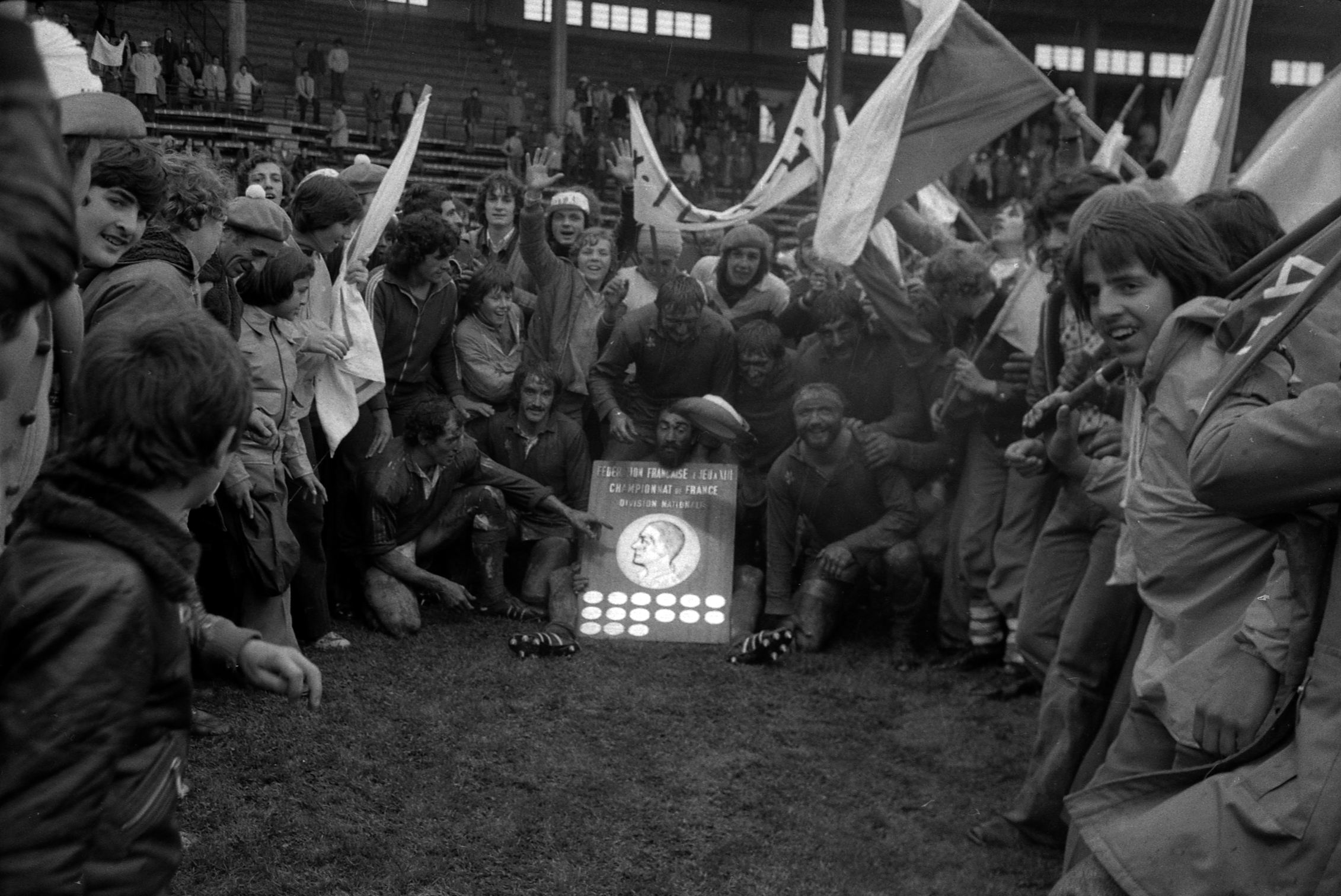
Toulouse Olympique celebrating victory in the French Rugby League Championship in 1973 and 1975

In 1944, Toulouse reached the semi-final of the French Cup in rugby union. In the meantime the Arnauné stadium was confiscated by the State, like most of the assets of the French Federation of rugby league. Following liberation by the Allies and the restoration of the French Championship, the club were on the losing side twice when they met Carcassonne in the finals for the 1944–45 and 1945–46 competitions. After two decades away from the top, another strong team emerged that included Pierre Lacaze and under coach Georges Ailleres having finished runner-up in the league in 1963–64, they then lifted their first league title the following season beating US Villeneuve in the final 47–15. During the 1960s they also reached four cup finals but lost them all, 1962 against RC Roanne XIII 10–16, 1963 against AS Carcassonne 0–5, 1964 against US Villeneuve 2–10 and 1968 against AS Carcassonne 2–9. During the early 70s they lifted two more league titles, in season 1972–73 they beat Marseille XIII 18–0 and in 1974–75 they beat AS Saint Esteve 10–9. Their 1976 cup final defeat by XIII Catalan 8–23 would be their last final appearance in either league or cup until the new millennium.

Before that in 1995 the club changed their name to Toulouse Spacers due to their link up with the local aerospace company in the town, keeping this name until 2002.

=== 2000–08: End of trophy drought and Super League ambitions ===
In 2000 the club ended their long silverware drought when they won the championship title with a 20–18 victory over AS Saint Esteve and the following season reached the final again but lost out 32–20 against Villeneuve Leopards. Toulouse's ambition to join the Super League grew but in 2003, despite a stadium upgrade, youth development and becoming a limited company, their application was rejected by the Rugby Football League in favour of Catalans Dragons. After reverting to Toulouse Olympique the club reached two more league championship finals but lost both. In 2004–05 they were convincingly beaten by Union Treiziste Catalane 16-66 and the following season they lost again this time 18–21 against Pia XIII. In 2005 Toulouse became the first French club ever to reach the semi-finals of the Challenge Cup, after defeating Super League side Widnes Vikings 40–24 in the quarter-finals. They went on to lose 56–18 to world champions Leeds Rhinos in the semi-final at the Galpharm Stadium, Huddersfield.

=== 2009–10: Entry to British league system ===
In 2006, the Rugby Football League decided to introduce licensing for the 2009 Super League season, with the number of Super League clubs being increased from 12 to 14. Toulouse were one of the applicants but failed to win a licence, losing out to the 12 existing Super League clubs, Salford and the Crusaders. After the announcement however, the Rugby Football League invited Toulouse to enter the second tier Championship for the 2009 season, with a view to applying in the next round of franchising to be accepted to Super League in 2012. Offering no direct route to Super League at the time, Toulouse's spell in the Championship lasted three seasons.

In their first campaign, 2009, the season was acclaimed a success with them winning 9 games which included a record 5 match winning run this despite being beaten heavily on the opening round of matches live on television at Widnes Vikings 0–70. The second season saw improvement but at the end of 2010 it was announced that the club would be withdrawing from the Championship and returning to the French league from the 2012 season onwards.

=== 2011–15: Return to France ===
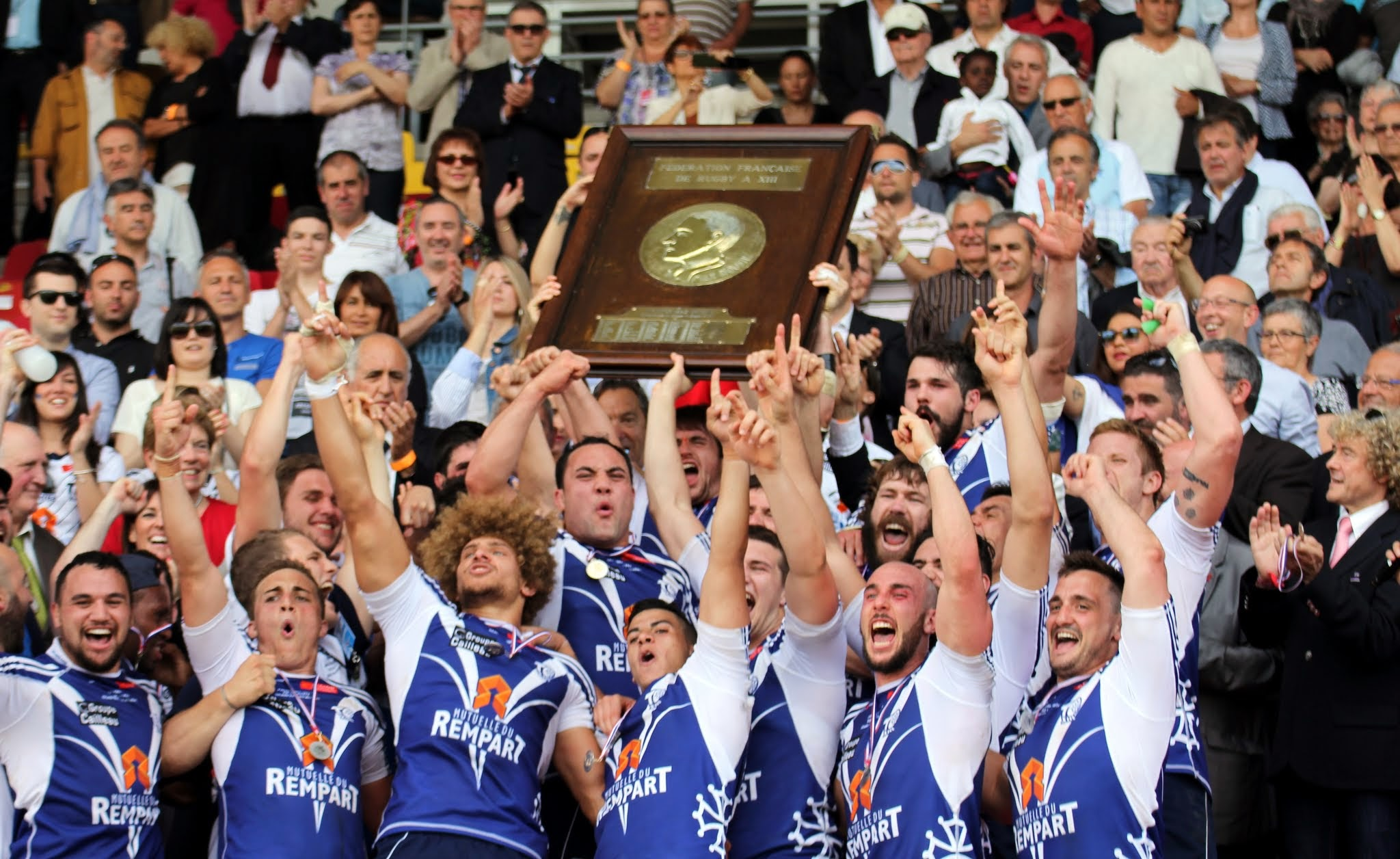
Toulouse Olympique winning in Elite One Championship in 2013–2014

Toulouse returned to the French Elite One Championship in 2011. They failed to make the Grand Final in the 2011–12 and 2012–13 season. However they the double in the following season, 2013–14, winning 38–12 against Lézignan Sangliers in the Grand Final and beating AS Carcassonne 46–10 in the final of the final of the Lord Derby Cup. This marked their first ever cup win in their then 77-year history. They then retained their league title when beating AS Carcassonne 20–12 in the 2014–15 Grand Final.

=== 2016–present: Re-entry to British leagues ===
In 2015, it was announced that Toulouse Olympique would return to the British rugby league system after they were accepted to play in League 1 from the 2016 season. A Toulouse presence would remain in the French Elite One Championship when Toulouse Broncos who were in the 2nd tier were taken over by Olympique and renamed Toulouse Olympique Broncos.

Toulouse went unbeaten during the League 1 2016 season but lost in the promotion final to Rochdale Hornets. They entered the playoffs, beating Barrow Raiders to win promotion to the Championship.

Toulouse finished the 2017 season with 15 wins and 8 loses from 23 games, finishing fifth in the league, missing out on the Super 8s by one place. Toulouse therefore entered the Championship Shield, winning it by beating Sheffield Eagles 44–14 in the final. l

Toulouse finished the 2018 season in third place, behind Toronto Wolfpack and London Broncos, before finishing second in 2019, again behind Toronto Wolfpack. They lost to Toronto in the Grand Final.

The 2021 season was Olympique's first full season after the 2020 season was suspended due to the COVID-19 pandemic, and final standings was based on win percentage as a COVID-19 precaution. Toulouse finished top of the table with 14 wins from 14 matches, winning the Championship Leaders' Shield. This comprised 13 matches played in England and a forfeited match when London Broncos failed to travel as required to Toulouse. Finishing top of the table, gave Toulouse home advantage in the semi-final, where they beat Batley 51–12. This pitted them against Featherstone in the Million Pound Game the following week, which saw them win 34–12 thus earn promotion to the Super League for the first time.

In August, Toulouse announced a new partnership with French club Gratentour XIII who would join Elite 2 for the 2021/22 season, and act as a feeder club. Toulouse Olympique made their debut in the Super League at home to Huddersfield. They raced out to a 10–0 lead but were defeated 42–14. On 19 March 2022, Toulouse recorded their first victory in the Super League, causing one of the competition's greatest upsets defeating three-time defending champions St Helens 22–20. In round 18 of the 2022 Super League season, the club earned their first win in the Super League on English soil defeating Wakefield Trinity 38–26 at Magic Weekend. In round 25 of the 2022 Super League season, Toulouse Olympique were officially relegated back to the Championship after losing to Catalans Dragons in the French Derby 24–14. In the 2023 RFL Championship season, Toulouse Olympique qualified for the playoffs before ultimately reaching the RFL Championship final formerly known as the Million Pound Game. Toulouse would host the final where they had not lost all season but suffered a shock 18–14 loss against the London Broncos which denied them an immediate return to the Super League. In the 2025 RFL season, the club finished second behind York on the table. In the grand final, the club would face off against York where they would record a 10-8 victory.

Toulouse were promoted to Super League in 2025 as a result of the league's expansion to 14 teams after they were initially denied promotion via IMG Grading, despite winning the Championship Grand Final.

== 2027 squad ==
2027 Toulouse Olympique squad
First team squad			Coaching staff
(England) Olly Ashall-Bott – FB, WG; (France) Lambert Belmas – PR; (England) Rob Butler – PR; (England) Joe Cator – LF; (France) Tiaki Chan – PR, SR; (France) Trevor Chiffoleau – PR; (France) Victor Collin – SO; (Scotland) Calum Gahan – HK, SH; (France) Hugo Garrigues – HK; (France) Bradley Goffin – SR; (England) Sam Hall – PR	(Australia) Brendan Hands – HK; (France) Mathieu Jussaume – CE, SR; (France) Thomas Lacans – SO, SH; (France) Benjamin Laguerre – WG; (France) Anthony Marion (c) – LF, HK; (Ireland) Henry O'Kane – SR, LF; (Italy) Luke Polselli – FB, SO, WG; (France) Mathieu Pons – WG; (Australia) Ethan Quai-Ward – CE, WG	(France) Baptise Rodriguez – LF, CE; (France) César Rougé – SH, HK, SO; (Lebanon) James Roumanos – PR, LF; (England) Jake Shorrocks – SH, SO; (France) Maxime Stefani – SR; (Australia) John Toleafoa – PR; (France) Roméo Tropis – CE; (Cook Islands) Paul Ulberg – WG	Head coach: (France) Sylvain Houles; Assistant coaches: (France) Eric Anselme; (France) Paul Marcon; (France) Christophe Toustou; Legend: (c) Captain(s); (vc) Vice-captain(s)

== 2027 transfers ==
=== Gains ===
Player	From	Contract	Date
(England) Sam Hall	Castleford Tigers	2 years	30 August 2026

=== Losses ===
Player	To	Contract	Date
(France) Pierre-Jean Lima	Albi Rugby League	1 year	26 August 2026
(England) Ellis Gillam			15 September 2026
(Cook Islands) Reubenn Rennie			15 September 2026
(Jamaica) AJ Wallace	Halifax Panthers	2 years	24 September 2026
(England) Joe Bretherton	Saint-Gaudens Bears	1 year	31 October 2026
(France) Louis Grossemy			18 November 2026

=== Retired ===
Player	Date
(France) Paul Marcon	24 September 2026

== List of seasons ==
Season	League										(France) Lord Derby Cup / (United Kingdom) Challenge Cup		Top try scorer		Top points scorer	
Season	Division	P	W	D	L	F	A	Pts	Pos	Play-offs	(France) Lord Derby Cup / (United Kingdom) Challenge Cup		Name	Tries	Name	Goals
1937–38	French Rugby League Championship	Unknown								Unknown	?	—N/a	Unknown			
1938–39	French Rugby League Championship	Unknown								Unknown	RU	—N/a	Unknown			
1939–40	French Rugby League Championship	Unknown								Unknown	?	—N/a	Unknown			
1940–41	French Rugby League Championship	Unknown								Unknown	?	—N/a	Unknown			
1941–42	French Rugby League Championship	Unknown								Unknown	?	—N/a	Unknown			
1942–43	French Rugby League Championship	Unknown								Unknown	?	—N/a	Unknown			
1943–44	French Rugby League Championship	Unknown								Unknown	?	—N/a	Unknown			
1944–45	French Rugby League Championship	Unknown								Runners-up	?	—N/a	Unknown			
1945–46	French Rugby League Championship	Unknown								Runners-up	?	—N/a	Unknown			
1946–47	French Rugby League Championship	Unknown								Unknown	?	—N/a	Unknown			
1947–48	French Rugby League Championship	Unknown								Unknown	?	—N/a	Unknown			
1948–49	French Rugby League Championship	Unknown								Unknown	?	—N/a	Unknown			
1949–50	French Rugby League Championship	Unknown								Unknown	?	—N/a	Unknown			
1950–51	French Rugby League Championship	Unknown								Unknown	?	—N/a	Unknown			
1951–52	French Rugby League Championship	Unknown								Unknown	?	—N/a	Unknown			
1952–53	French Rugby League Championship	Unknown								Unknown	?	—N/a	Unknown			
1953–54	French Rugby League Championship	Unknown								Unknown	?	—N/a	Unknown			
1954–55	French Rugby League Championship	Unknown								Unknown	?	—N/a	Unknown			
1955–56	French Rugby League Championship	Unknown								Unknown	?	—N/a	Unknown			
1956–57	French Rugby League Championship	Unknown								Unknown	?	—N/a	Unknown			
1957–58	French Rugby League Championship	Unknown								Unknown	?	—N/a	Unknown			
1958–59	French Rugby League Championship	Unknown								Unknown	?	—N/a	Unknown			
1959–60	French Rugby League Championship	Unknown								Unknown	?	—N/a	Unknown			
1960–61	French Rugby League Championship	Unknown								Unknown	?	—N/a	Unknown			
1961–62	French Rugby League Championship	Unknown								Unknown	RU	—N/a	Unknown			
1962–63	French Rugby League Championship	Unknown								Unknown	?	—N/a	Unknown			
1963–64	French Rugby League Championship	Unknown								Runners-up	RU	—N/a	Unknown			
1964–65	French Rugby League Championship	Unknown								Champions	?	—N/a	Unknown			
1965–66	French Rugby League Championship	Unknown								Unknown	?	—N/a	Unknown			
1966–67	French Rugby League Championship	Unknown								Unknown	?	—N/a	Unknown			
1967–68	French Rugby League Championship	Unknown								Unknown	RU	—N/a	Unknown			
1968–69	French Rugby League Championship	Unknown								Unknown	?	—N/a	Unknown			
1969–70	French Rugby League Championship	Unknown								Unknown	?	—N/a	Unknown			
1971–72	French Rugby League Championship	Unknown								Unknown	?	—N/a	Unknown			
1972–73	French Rugby League Championship	Unknown								Champions	?	—N/a	Unknown			
1973–74	French Rugby League Championship	Unknown								Unknown	?	—N/a	Unknown			
1974–75	French Rugby League Championship	Unknown								Champions	?	—N/a	Unknown			
1975–76	French Rugby League Championship	Unknown								Unknown	?	—N/a	Unknown			
1976–77	French Rugby League Championship	Unknown								Unknown	?	—N/a	Unknown			
1977–78	French Rugby League Championship	Unknown								Unknown	?	—N/a	Unknown			
1978–79	French Rugby League Championship	Unknown								Unknown	?	—N/a	Unknown			
1979–80	French Rugby League Championship	Unknown								Unknown	?	—N/a	Unknown			
1980–81	French Rugby League Championship	Unknown								Unknown	?	—N/a	Unknown			
1981–82	French Rugby League Championship	Unknown								Unknown	?	—N/a	Unknown			
1982–83	French Rugby League Championship	Unknown								Unknown	?	—N/a	Unknown			
1983–84	French Rugby League Championship	Unknown								Unknown	?	—N/a	Unknown			
1984–85	French Rugby League Championship	Unknown								Unknown	?	—N/a	Unknown			
1985–86	French Rugby League Championship	Unknown								Unknown	?	—N/a	Unknown			
1986–87	French Rugby League Championship	Unknown								Unknown	?	—N/a	Unknown			
1987–88	French Rugby League Championship	Unknown								Unknown	?	—N/a	Unknown			
1988–89	French Rugby League Championship	Unknown								Unknown	?	—N/a	Unknown			
1989–90	French Rugby League Championship	Unknown								Unknown	?	—N/a	Unknown			
1990–91	French Rugby League Championship	Unknown								Unknown	?	—N/a	Unknown			
1991–92	French Rugby League Championship	Unknown								Unknown	?	—N/a	Unknown			
1992–93	French Rugby League Championship	Unknown								Unknown	?	—N/a	Unknown			
1993–94	French Rugby League Championship	Unknown								Unknown	?	—N/a	Unknown			
1994–95	French Rugby League Championship	Unknown								Unknown	?	—N/a	Unknown			
1995–96	French Rugby League Championship	Unknown								Unknown	?	—N/a	Unknown			
1996–97	French Rugby League Championship	Unknown								Unknown	?	—N/a	Unknown			
1997–98	French Rugby League Championship	Unknown								Unknown	?	—N/a	Unknown			
1998–99	French Rugby League Championship	Unknown								Unknown	?	—N/a	Unknown			
1999–00	French Rugby League Championship	Unknown								Champions	?	—N/a	Unknown			
2000–01	French Rugby League Championship	Unknown								Runners-up	?	—N/a	Unknown			
2001–02	French Rugby League Championship	Unknown								Unknown	?	—N/a	Unknown			
2002–03		Unknown								Unknown	?	—N/a				
2003–2004	Elite One Championship	18	12	0	6	602	286	42	3rd	None Played	?	—N/a				
2004–2005	Elite One Championship	18	15	0	3	668	310	47	2nd	None Played	?	SF				
2005–2006	Elite One Championship	20	16	0	4	830	268	52	2nd	None Played	?	R4				
2006–2007	Elite One Championship	20	15	1	4	643	333	51	2nd	Lost in Semi-final	?	R3				
2007–2008	Elite One Championship	20	8	0	12	353	518	36	7th	Lost in Round One	?	R4				
(United Kingdom) Transfer to British rugby league system
2009	Championship	20	9	0	11	556	582	30	10th	Did not qualify	—N/a	R3				
2010	Championship	20	8	0	12	486	649	27	8th	Did not qualify	—N/a	R4				
2011	Championship	20	4	0	16	358	663	15	10th	Did not qualify	—N/a	R3				
(France) Transfer to French rugby league system
2011–2012	Elite One Championship	18	12	0	6	442	352	42	5th	Lost in Quarter-final	?	R3				
2012–2013	Elite One Championship	Unknown								Unknown	?	R4				
2013–2014	Elite One Championship	Unknown								Champions	W	—N/a				
2014–2015	Elite One Championship	Unknown								Champions	?	—N/a				
(United Kingdom) Transfer to British rugby league system
2016	League 1	14	13	1	0	702	184	27	1st	Grand Final – Runners-up Play-off Final – Winners	—N/a	R6				
2017	Championship	23	15	0	8	720	466	30	5th	Championship Shield – Winners	—N/a	R4				
2018	Championship	23	16	1	6	900	438	33	3rd	Did not qualify	—N/a	—N/a				
2018	The Qualifiers	7	3	0	4	156	190	6	6th	Did not qualify	—N/a	—N/a				
2019	Championship	27	20	0	7	877	446	40	2nd	Lost in Preliminary Final	—N/a	—N/a				
2020	Championship (Note: The 2020 Championship was abandoned due to the COVID-19 pandemic in the United Kingdom. Statistics shown are those at time of abandonment and are not official.)	5	5	0	0	180	48	10	1st	None Played	—N/a	—N/a				
2021	Championship	14	14	0	0	698	124	28	1st	Won in Grand Final	—N/a	—N/a				
2022	Super League	27	5	0	22	421	745	10	12th	Relegated	—N/a	—N/a				
2023	Championship	27	19	0	8	834	385	38	2nd	Lost in Grand Final	—N/a	—N/a				
2024	Championship	26	18	1	7	782	384	37	2nd	Lost in Grand Final	—N/a	—N/a				
2025	Championship	24	19	0	5	651	314	38	2nd	Won in Grand Final	—N/a	—N/a				
2026	Super League	27	10	0	17	578	704	20	8th	Did not qualify	—N/a	—N/a				

== Honours ==
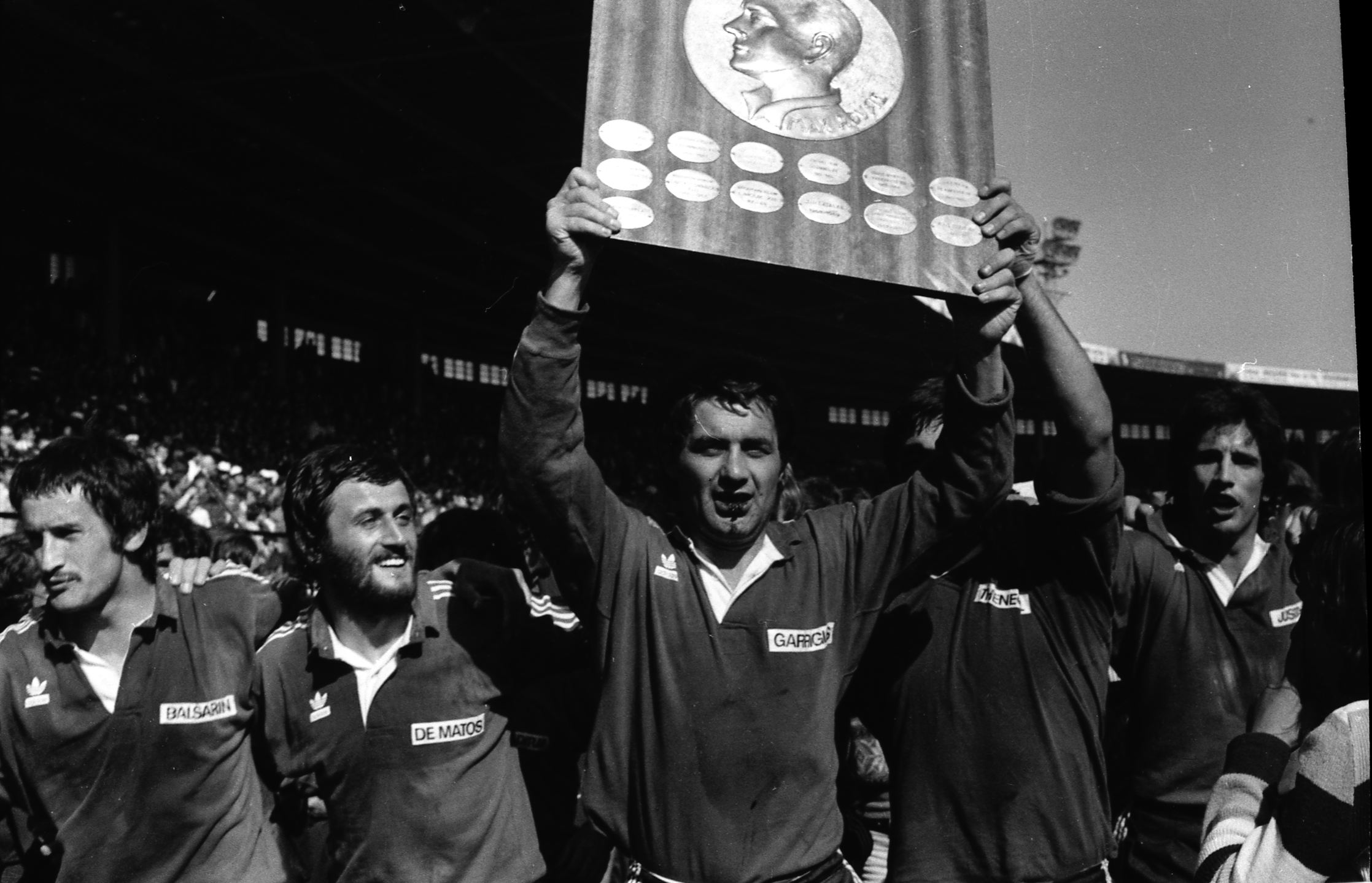
Title in 1973. From left to right: Orféo Balsarin, Maurice de Matos, Roger Garrigue, Charles Thénégal and Henri Justal.

=== Leagues ===
- (France) French Championship / Elite One Championship

Winners (6): 1964–65, 1972–73, 1974–75, 1999–2000, 2013–14, 2014–15
Runners-up (6): 1944–45, 1945–46, 1963–64, 2000–01, 2004–05, 2005–06

- (United Kingdom) Championship

Winners (2): 2021, 2025

League Leaders (Note: The 2020 RFL Championship was abandoned due to the COVID-19 pandemic in the United Kingdom. Toulouse Olympique were in first place at time of abandonment.): 2021
Championship Shield: 2017

- (United Kingdom) League One

Runners-up (1): 2016

League Leaders: 2016
Promotion Play-offs: 2016

=== Cups ===
- (France) Lord Derby Cup

Winners (1): 2013–14
Runners-up (5): 1938–39, 1961–62, 1962–63, 1963–64, 1967–68

== See also ==
- Rugby Football League expansion
