= Via Occitanie =

French television channel

Vià Occitanie is a French television channel, part of the Vià network, operating in the Occitanie region of southern France. Formerly known from 2011 until 2017 as TVSud, the channel provides local programming for the cities of southern France.

== History ==
TVSud was launched on February 7, 2011, with programming each day from 7am to 11pm. The station changed its name to Vià Occitanie on 28 September 2017.

Vià Occitanie is available in Southern France on terrestrial television, is carried by some French cable TV providers in various regions (mostly in the South) and is available online both nationally and internationally.

== Programming ==
Most programming is locally based and produced. Newscasts air every half hour.

=== Sport ===
Vià Occitanie is the national broadcast partner of the Elite One Championship through its cable and online services. The terrestrial free-to-air coverage in the Southern regions, where rugby league is the most popular sport, ensures that the public can view the competition for free. The online services also make the competition available worldwide.
