= Stade de l'Aiguille =

Multi-purpose stadium in Limoux, France

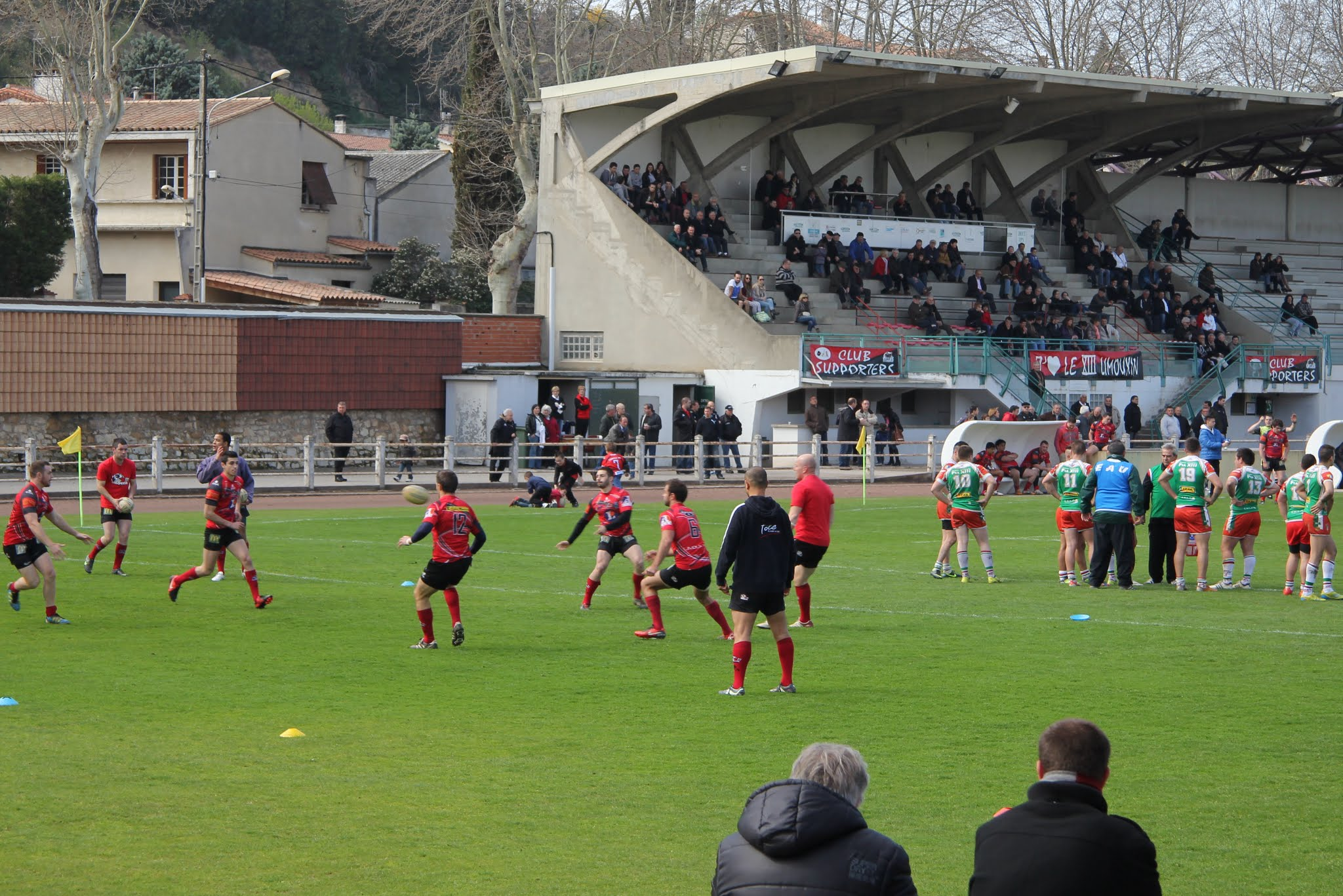
- Main stand in 2016
- Interactive map of Stade de l'Aiguille
- Location: Rue d'Anjou, 11800 Trebes, Limoux, France
- Coordinates: 43°03′53″N 2°12′53″E
- Owner: Mairie Limoux (Limoux town council)
- Capacity: 5,000
- Surface: Grass
- Field size: 115m x 75m

Construction
- Renovated: 1975, 1984

Tenant
- Limoux Grizzlies

The Stade de l'Aguille is a multi-purpose stadium in Limoux, France. It hosts tennis, football and rugby league. Super XIII side Limoux Grizzlies use it as their home ground and have done since it opened. Situated near the river Aude, the name translates as Stadium of the Needle. The stadium has floodlights and one main stand which can accommodate 400 seated fans. The capacity is currently 5,000. Owned by the local town council the stadium has received two recent renovations in 1975 and in 1984. The ground has played host to Challenge Cup games.

== Rugby League Challenge Cup ==
Date	Opponents	Score	Attendance
29 February 2004	Halifax	19-18	1,200
14 March 2004	Wigan Warriors	20-80	2,500
17 April 2010	Leigh Centurions	20-32	2,000
