= Stade Max Rousie =

Multi-purpose stadium in France

- Interactive map of Stade Max Rousie
- Former names: Myre Mory Stadium
- Location: 93 Avenue d'Agen, 47300 Villeneuce-sur-Lot, France
- Coordinates: 44°23′33″N 0°42′46″E
- Owner: Mairie Villeneuve-sur-Lot (Villeneuve-sur-Lot town council)
- Capacity: 5,000 (1,434 seated)
- Surface: Grass

Construction
- Built: 1955
- Opened: 1955
- Renovated: 2011
- Expanded: 2011

Tenant
- Villeneuve Leopards (1955-)

The Stade Max Rousie is a multi-purpose stadium in Villeneuve-sur-Lot, France. It is currently used for rugby league by Villeneuve Leopards as their home ground in the Super XIII. The stadium has a 5,000 capacity with 1,434 of these seated in the main stand.

== History ==
The Stade Max Rousie was built and opened in 1955 for the primary use of the local rugby league team US Villeneuve XIII. The stadium was initially called Myre Mory Stadium, named after a local soldier who fought in World War I and was killed during World War II in 1940. Situated on the left bank of the river Lot, near the Lycee Georges Leygues, the stadium was given a major refurbishment in 2011. In addition, an indoor arena was built. At this time, the sports complex was renamed in honour of Max Rousie, a former SA Villeneuve XIII player and French international. The stadium currently hosts sports including rugby league, athletics, basketball, tennis, and pelote basque. It also has two training pitches and floodlights.

== Robert de la Myre Mory sports complex stadiums ==
In addition to the main pitch with its 1,434-seat grandstand, the sports facilities include 2 training pitches, 1 pitch with a 500-seat grandstand for soccer + 1 training pitch, an 8-lane synthetic athletics track, as well as 2 indoor tennis courts, 10 outdoor tennis courts, an outdoor basketball court and a pelota court.
