= Stade des Minimes =

French rugby stadium

- Interactive map of Stade des Minimes
- Former names: Stade Arnauné
- Location: 107 Avenue Frédéric Estèbe, Toulouse, Haute-Garonne, France
- Coordinates: 43°37′30.77″N 1°26′7.64″E
- Owner: Mairie de Toulouse (Toulouse town council)
- Capacity: 4,066
- Surface: Grass

Construction
- Built: 1937
- Opened: 1937

Tenants
- Toulouse Olympique (1937–2015); Toulouse Olympique Broncos (2014–)

Stade des Minimes, also known Stade Arnauné, is a rugby league stadium in Toulouse, France. It is the home ground of Toulouse Olympique Broncos.

== History ==
Stade des Minimes has been the home of Toulouse Olympique since their founding in 1937. The town council agreed to purchase the ground for the sole use of the new sport, rugby league. When the river Garonne burst its banks in 1965 a test match between France and New Zealand scheduled for the Stade Municipal in Toulouse was cancelled because of flooding, the game was moved across town to the Stade des Minimes the first international game played at the ground. The same thing happened in 1999 when a round of matches in the Mediterranean Cup was moved when Lézignan's Stade du Moulin was also waterlogged. In 2015 when Toulouse Olympique moved to the British rugby league system to play in League 1 Toulouse Olympique moved to the Stade Ernest-Argeles. Toulouse Olympique Broncos who play in the Elite One Championship in France remained at the ground. Currently it has a capacity of 4066, including (2,000 seats). It is due to be expanded to reach a 10,000 capacity over the next two years. The renovation plans include the extending of the two main stands, the creation of a shop, a gym, and an administrative office for the club. The cost of the project is estimated to be 8 million euros.

== Rugby League Internationals ==
Date	Teams	Score	Attendance	Tournament
3 March 1957	France v Great Britain	19–19	16,000	Test Match
1 March 1959	France v Wales	25–8	25,000	Test Match
17 February 1963	France v Wales	23–3	6,150	Test Match
22 December 1963	France v Australia	9–21	6,936	1963–64 Kangaroo tour
12 December 1965	France v New Zealand	28–5	7,000	1965–66 France vs New Zealand series
7 January 1968	France v Australia	16–13	5,000	1967–68 Kangaroo tour
15 March 1970	France v England	14–9	6,587	1969–70 European Rugby League Championship
7 February 1971	France v Great Britain	16–8	14,960	Test Match
16 December 1973	France v Australia	3–14	7,060	1973 Kangaroo tour
20 February 1977	France v Wales	13–2	5,827	1977 European Rugby League Championship
5 March 1978	France v England	11–13	6,000	1978 European Rugby League Championship
10 December 1978	France v Australia	11–10	6,500	1978 Kangaroo tour
14 November 1999	France v Lebanon	38–24	1,000	Mediterranean Cup
14 November 1999	Italy v Morocco	38–0	1,000	2000 Rugby League World Cup qualifying
