= Stade du Moulin =

Rugby league stadium in Lézignan-Corbières, France

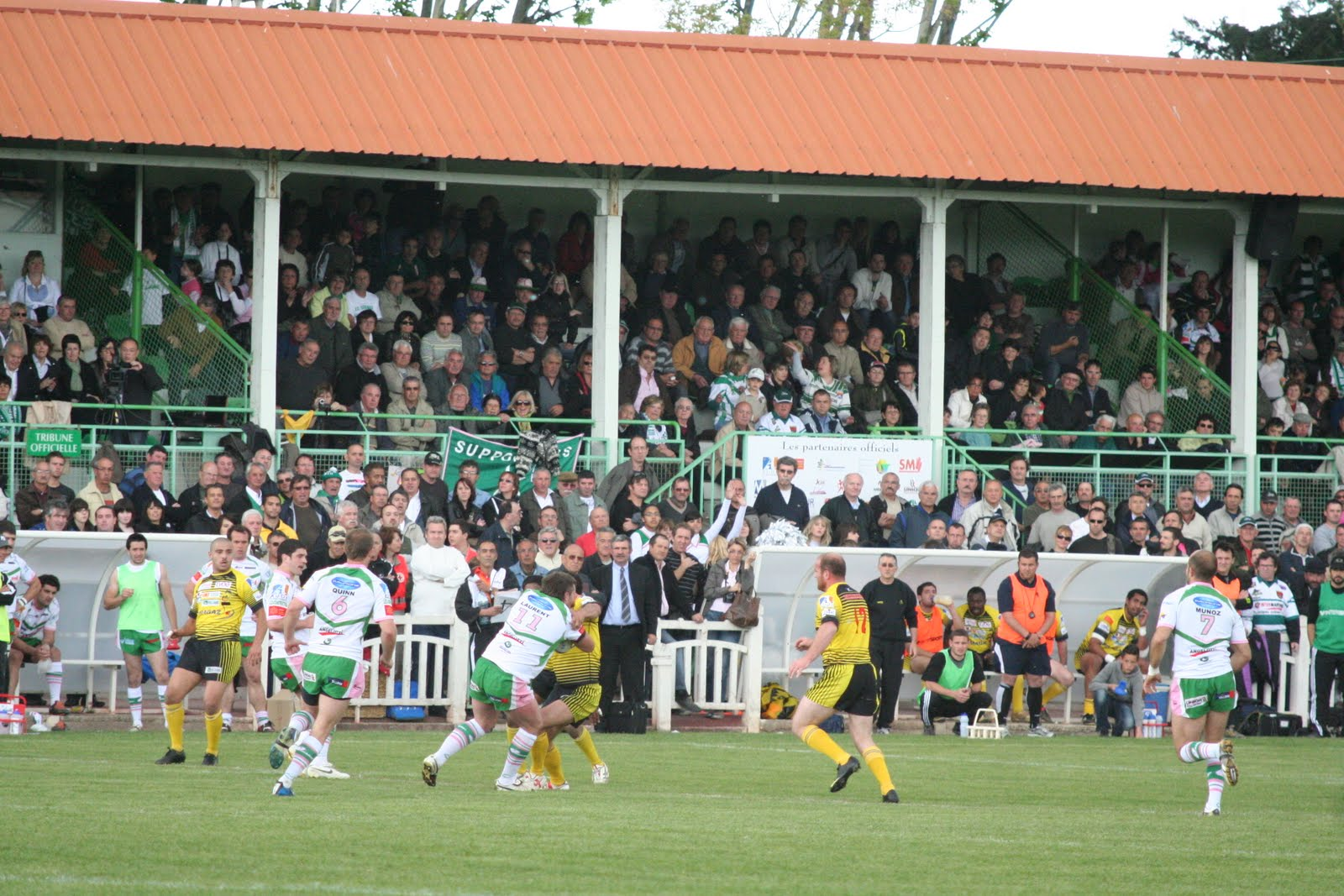
- Main Stand
- Interactive map of Stade du Moulin
- Location: 11,200 Boulevard Claude Benard, Lezignan-Corbieres, France
- Coordinates: 43°11′45″N 2°45′33″E
- Owner: Mairie Lezignan-Corbieres (Lezignan-Corbieres Town Council)
- Capacity: 6,000 (1,000 seated)
- Surface: grass
- Record attendance: 8,200
- Field size: 130m x 70m

Construction
- Built: 1919
- Opened: October 1919
- Renovated: 1945, 2000
- Expanded: 2011

Tenant
- FC Lézignan XIII

The Stade du Moulin is a rugby league stadium in Lézignan-Corbières, France. It is the home of Super XIII club FC Lézignan XIII.

== History ==
Originally the land was a vineyard until bought by the club's chairman Gustave Gayraud in 1919. The name translates as Stadium of the Mill, because there were two mills on the land, the windmill is now just ruins while a watermill is still in use and situated behind the main stand. The first match was between FC Lezignan and Stade Toulousain in October 1919.

The stadium was hit by floods in 1999 which led to the grounds first real renovation in 2000. In 2011 a new clubhouse was built. The record attendance came in 1961 when 8,200 people watched a league match, the current capacity is 6,000 of which 1,000 are seated. On 3 July 2001 it hosted its first and so far only international match when the France national rugby league team lost against the Scotland national rugby league team 20-42 watched by 3,161 spectators. In 2016 the stadium hosted the Elite Two Championship Final between RC Lescure-Arthes XIII and La Reole XIII.

== Rugby League Internationals ==
Date	Teams	Score	Attendance	Tournament
3 July 2001	France v Scotland	20-42	3,161	Friendly
