= XIII Limouxin =

French semi-professional rugby league club

Limoux Grizzlies

Club information
- Full name: XIII Limouxin Grizzlies
- Nickname: Grizzlies
- Founded: 1951; 75 years ago
- Website: www.13-limouxin.fr

Current details
- Ground: Stade de l'Aiguille (5000)
- Chairman: Laurent Coronas and Jacques Pech
- Coach: Maxime Greseque
- Competition: Super XIII
- 2024–25: 5th

Uniforms
Home colours

XIII Limouxin, also known as Limoux Grizzlies, are a semi-professional rugby league club from the town of Limoux in the Aude area in southern France. They play in the Super XIII. The club was formed in 1951. They have won the French rugby league championship four times and Lord Derby Cup on two occasions. The Stade de l'Aiguille is their home stadium.

== History ==
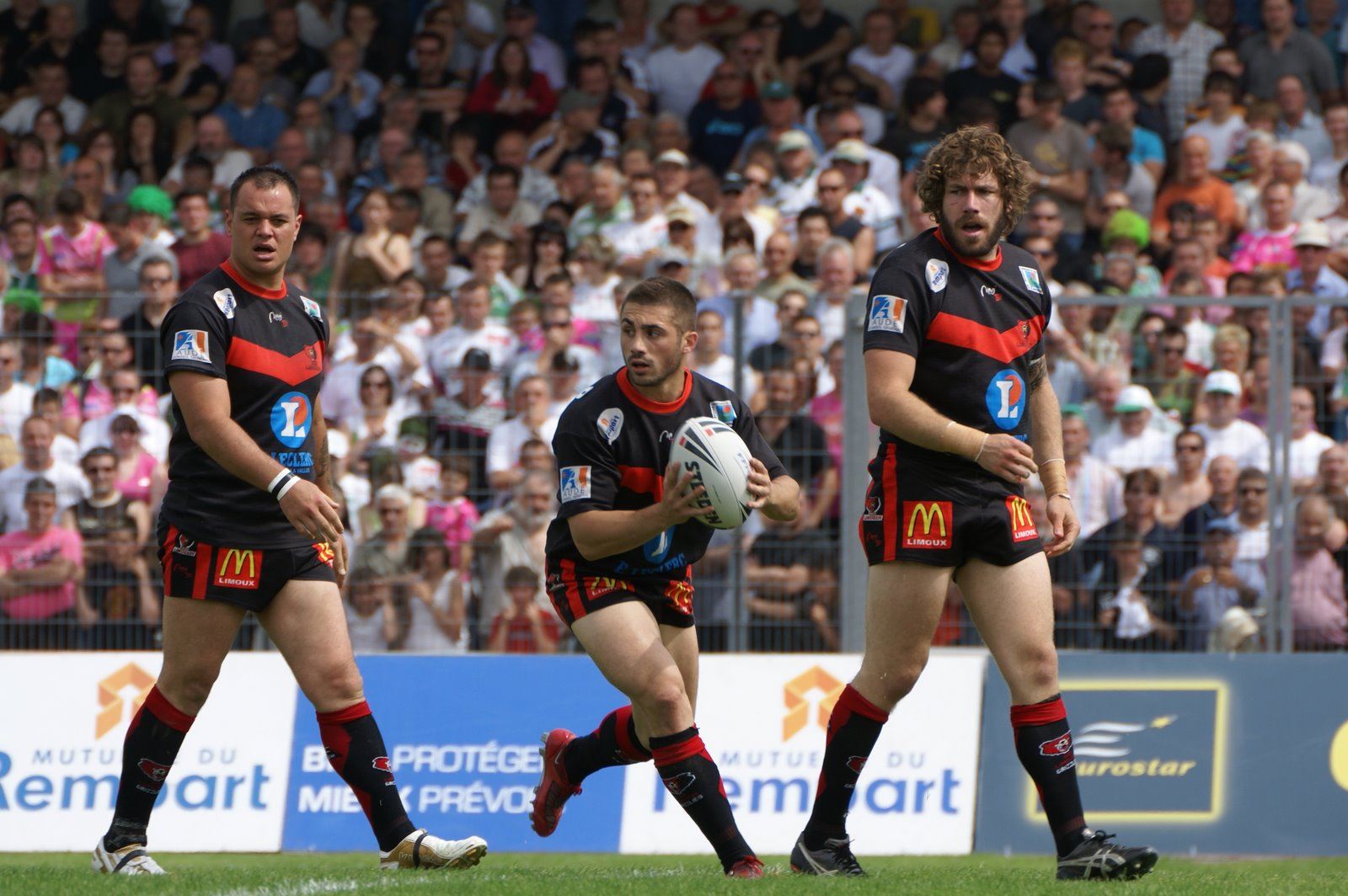
Limoux players in the final of the 2008-2009 French Championship against Lézignan (May 2009)

On 22 October 1951 after a disagreement with the French rugby union the club switched codes and under the name Sporting Club Limoux XIII they entered the amateur Federal League. In the 1955–56 season they won the cup and were runners-up in the league. In 1962 the club entered the National League and after reaching the cup semi-final in 1967 they lifted the championship title in 1968 in Toulouse against AS Carcassonne, 13–12, after extra time in front of 15,000 fans. The team that day was: Andrieu, Blair, Bonnafous, Belli, Bellinguier, Bernadoi, Costeseque, Datta, Dumas, Guiraud (captain), Lecinena, Marty, Dolly, Parpaiola, Roldos, Satge, and Vergeysnt. Datta, Blair and Guiraud would go on and play against the Australia national rugby league team in the 1968 Rugby League World Cup in what was in effect the final. The win didn't bring in a spell of silverware, as the club wouldn't reach another final until 1984.

Runners-up in successive cup finals in 1984 and 85 proved to be a false dawn as they were relegated at the end of the decade. Runner-up in the Elite Two Championship in 1992 brought them back to the top flight from where they have since remained. Two cup wins in 1996 and 2008 the first under captain Frederic Teixido were the only triumphs that brought them plenty of heartache. 1997, 2001, 2005 saw them beaten finalists in the cup and as holders in 2009 they were once again beaten finalists against AS Carcassonne. In 2009 despite finishing top of the league table they lost the final against Lézignan Sangliers. In 2010 they finished 2nd in the league and were runners-up in the cup, losing to Lezignan again. 2011 and once again having topped the league they were beaten by Lezignan in the final. After a couple of seasons of mid-table mediocrity, apart from a cup semi-final appearance in 2012, 2016 brought the club back to playing finals. Another defeat in the cup final against Saint-Esteve XIII Catalan 16–33 brought more woes but in the championship final they claimed their second title, the first for 48 years, by beating AS Carcassonne, 26–24. The following season they retained their title after beating Lézignan Sangliers in the final 24-22.

=== Challenge Cup history ===
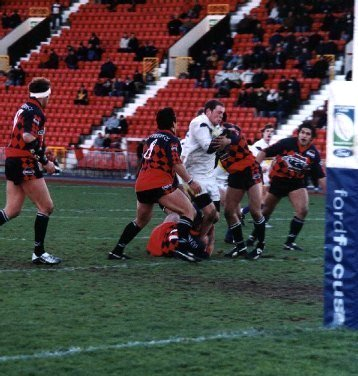
Limoux playing against Gateshead Thunder in the 2004 Challenge Cup

Despite playing in the French league, Limoux have entered the Challenge Cup, Britain's most senior rugby league knockout competition, on four separate occasions. The following is a summary of their results:

	2004		2006		2007		2010	
	Opponent	Score	Opponent	Score	Opponent	Score	Opponent	Score
R3	Gateshead Thunder	26–22	Batley Bulldogs	10–24	Gateshead Thunder	22–38	London Skolars	42–16
R4	Halifax	19–16					Leigh Centurions	20–32
R5	Wigan Warriors	20–80						

== Colours and badge ==
Club's former badge

The club plays in predominantly black with red trims. The Grizzlies moniker was introduced during the 1990s.

== Stadium ==
The club play at the Stade de l'Aiguille which is a multi-sports arena. The name roughly translates as 'Stage of the Needle'. It has a 5,000 capacity.

== Current squad ==
Squad for the 2026-2027 Super XIII season

- (France) Bastien Ader (Centre)
- (France) Enzo Arnaud (Wing)
- (France) Mahault Beauvilliers (Hooker)
- (France) Yann Belmaaziz (Second-row)
- (France) Justin Bouscayrol (Hooker)
- (France) Hugo Cabanne (Prop)
- (France) Quentin Crunel (Wing)
- (France) Matis Dall'asta (Five-eighth)
- (France) Paolo Dall'asta (Lock)
- (France) Theo Marrot (Wing)
- (France) Hakim Miloudi (Centre)
- (New Zealand) Neihana Oldham (Prop)
- (France) Elie Sastre (Wing)
- (Samoa) Jamie-Jerry Taulagi (Centre)
- (France) Allan Torreilles (Lock)
- (France) Benjamin Vergniol (Second-row)
- (France) Valentin Yesa (Prop)

== Notable former players ==
- Joseph Guiraud
- David Ferriol
- Marcel Bescos
- Daniel Divet
- Frederic Teixido
- Vincent Duport
- Mathias Pala
- Mickael Simon
- John Palavi

== Honours ==
- French Rugby League Championship / Elite 1:
  Winners (4): 1967–68, 2015–16, 2016–17, 2022–23
  Runners-up (3): 2008–09, 2010–11, 2017–18
- Lord Derby Cup:
  Winners (2): 1995–96, 2007–08
  Runners-up (8): 1996–96, 2000–01, 2004–05, 2009–10, 2012–12, 2015–16, 2017–18
- Federal Cup (Coupe Falcou) (1): 1956
