= Les Pionniers (rugby league) =

1934 French rugby league tour of England

Les Pionniers (Galia's Boys) 1934 tour of England
- Date: 5–26 March 1934
- Manager: Jean Galia
- Coach(es): Jean Galia
- Tour captain(s): Jean Galia
Summary
P	W	D	L
Total
6	1	0	5

Tour chronology
- Next tour: 1951

Les Pionniers, also known as Galia's Boys, were the first French representative rugby league team. They toured England from 5 to 26 March 1934, playing six matches against English rugby league teams. Led by former French international rugby union player Jean Galia, the team brought together rugby union players with the aim of introducing rugby league to France. Their initiative followed a series of controversies in French rugby union in the early 1930s concerning concealed professionalism (amateurisme marron) and what were considered arbitrary player suspensions imposed by the French Rugby Federation. These events led to France's exclusion from the Five Nations Championship in 1931. Galia persuaded sixteen players to accompany him on the tour, which marked the beginning of rugby league in France.

Following the interest generated by the tour and with the support of the English Rugby Football League, the Ligue Française de rugby à XIII was established. It organised the France national rugby league team, which played its first official match against England on 15 April 1934, followed by a French championship and a French Cup from the 1934–35 season.

== History ==
Results of the tour
Date	Match	Score
10 March 1934	Wigan defeated France	30–27
14 March 1934	Leeds defeated France	25–17
17 March 1934	Rugby League selection defeated France	32–16
21 March 1934	London defeated France	19–17
24 March 1934	France defeated Hull FC	26–23
26 March 1934	Salford defeated France	35–13

At a time when no French federation yet existed for the new form of rugby, then known as néo-rugby, the tour was the first official international sporting appearance by French rugby league. The team assembled by Jean Galia consisted of rugby union players who had fallen out with the rugby union establishment or had been recruited for the occasion, including Robert Samatan, Jean Duhau, François Récaborde, Charles Petit and Antonin Barbazanges.. Before the tour, the English Rugby Football League arranged for the French players to train at Headingley in Leeds. According to France olympique, Joe Thompson, a former Leeds captain, and Jonathan Parkin, a former England captain, were appointed to coach the French team during its preparations. The first training session was scheduled for 6 March 1934, a few days before the opening match against Wigan.

Despite losing five of their six matches, the Pioneers laid the foundations for rugby league in France. Bound to Galia by an agreement in principle, they provided the technical basis for the clubs and the core of the representative teams formed in the following months.

All the Pioneers were made life members of the federation. They received the medal of the City of Paris in 1937, on the day of the France–British Empire match, and the federation's medal of recognition in 1959.

==== Expulsion from the French Rugby Federation ====
Jean Galia.

On 19 March 1934, during the tour of England, the French newspaper Paris-Soir reported that the French Rugby Federation (FFR) had permanently removed from its registers the players who had joined Jean Galia's rugby league group. The decision affected Jean Duhau (SA Bordelais), Gaston Amila (AS Carcassonne), Laurent Lambert (SO Avignon), Jean Cassagneau (US Quillan), Antonin Barbazanges, Robert Samatan and François Nouel, the last three having already had their playing licences withdrawn. Joseph Carrère had previously been refused a playing licence at Narbonne, while Léopold Fabre, of Lézignan, had already received a two-year suspension for violent conduct.

The newspaper also named Georges Blanc (US Tyrosse), Charles Petit (SU Lorrain) and Jean-Marie Vignal (TOEC), noting that Petit and Vignal had already been expelled from their respective clubs. Other players had previously been expelled from the FFR: Galia, of CA Villeneuve, for professionalism, François Récaborde, of Section Paloise, for violent conduct, and Henri Dechavanne, of NAC Roanne, under Article 1 of the federation's regulations. Maurice Porra, of FC Lyon, was also among those named in the decision.

== French touring party ==
The tour was organised by representatives of French rugby league: Maurice Blein, a journalist with the sports newspaper Sporting; Charles Bernat, a former director of Stade Buffalo; and player-coach Jean Galia. Sixteen other players took part.

The Pioneers' touring party
Role	Position	Members
French rugby league representatives		Charles Bernat, Maurice Blein and Jean Galia
Coach		Jean Galia
Forwards	Props	Georges Blanc and Jean Duhau
Forwards	Hookers	Léopold Fabre and Maurice Porra
Forwards	Second-row forwards	Henri Dechavanne, Jean Galia and Charles Petit
Forwards	Loose forward	François Récaborde
Backs	Scrum-half	Joseph Carrère
Backs	Stand-offs	Charles Mathon and Jean-Marie Vignal
Backs	Centres	Gaston Amila, Antonin Barbazanges and François Nouel
Backs	Wingers	Laurent Lambert and Robert Samatan
Backs	Fullback	Jean Cassagneau

=== First match: Wigan ===
10 March 1934

Wigan	30-27	France
Tries: 6 Twose (2), Morley, Davis; Goals: 5 Sullivan 1 (match-winning conversion); Drop goals: 1 Sullivan 1	1st: 18-14; 2nd: 12-13	Tries: 7 Blanc (2), Barbazanges (2), Galia (2); Goals: 3

Poolstock Stadium, Wigan
Attendance: 10,000
Referee: J. E. Taylor (Wakefield)
Touch judges: E. Houghton (Warrington), T. Collins (St Helens)

Team lists:

FB	1	Jim Sullivan
WG	2	Jack Morley
CE	3	Howarth
CE	4	Gwyn Davies
WG	5	Twose
FE	6	George Bennett
HB	7	Hector Gee
PR	8	Targett
HK	9	Colby
PR	10	Harold Edwards
SR	11	Len Mason
SR	12	Reginald Hathway
LK	13	Albert Davis
Coach:
(Wales) Jim Sullivan

FB	1	Jean Cassagneau
WG	2	Robert Samatan
CE	3	Antonin Barbazanges
CE	4	François Nouel
WG	5	Laurent Lambert
FE	6	Charles Mathon
HB	7	Joseph Carrère
PR	8	Jean Duhau
HK	9	Maurice Porra
PR	10	Georges Blanc
SR	11	Henri Dechavanne
SR	12	Jean Galia (c)
LK	13	François Récaborde
Coach:
(France) Jean Galia

The French team faced Wigan at Poolstock Stadium on 10 March 1934, only a few days after arriving in England. The players had left Paris on 5 March and begun training two days later, leaving little time to familiarise themselves with rugby league.

Wigan took an early 8–0 lead through tries by Jack Morley and Albert Davis. Georges Blanc scored France's first try following a pass from Laurent Lambert, but Wigan extended their lead to 13–3. Robert Samatan then suffered a knee injury, temporarily disrupting the French team. Blanc scored again after receiving a pass from Jean Galia, before Antonin Barbazanges added another try. Wigan led 18–14 at half-time. France drew level at 18–18 after the interval, and the two teams continued to exchange the lead. With a few minutes remaining, the French side were ahead 27–25, but Wigan scored a late converted try to win 30–27.

Writing in France olympique, F. Estrade noted the limited preparation of the French players and considered their performance encouraging. The newspaper also reproduced comments from the British press, including Sporting Life, the Daily Mail and the Daily Chronicle, which praised the French team's first appearance against established rugby league opposition.

=== Second match: Leeds ===
14 March 1934

Leeds	25-17	France
Tries: 7 Smith (4), Harris, Busch, Jubb; Goals: 2 Brough (2)	1st: 9-5; 2nd: 16-12	Tries: 5 Lambert, Barbazanges, Porra, Galia, Carrère; Goals: 1 Cassagneau

Headingley, Leeds
Attendance: 6,000

Team lists:

FB	1	Jim Brough
WG	2	Eric Harris
CE	3	Les Grainge
CE	4	Gwyn Parker
WG	5	Stanley Smith
FE	6	Evan Williams
HB	7	Joe Busch
PR	8	David Jenkins
HK	9	Jack Lowe
PR	10	Stan Satterthwaite
SR	11	Ken Jubb
SR	12	Sep Aspinall
LK	13	Thomas Jones
Coach:

FB	1	Jean Cassagneau
WG	2	Antonin Barbazanges
CE	3	François Nouel
CE	4	Jean-Marie Vignal
WG	5	Laurent Lambert
FE	6	Charles Mathon
HB	7	Joseph Carrère
PR	8	Georges Blanc
HK	9	Maurice Porra
PR	10	Charles Petit
SR	11	Henri Dechavanne
SR	12	Jean Duhau
LK	13	Jean Galia (c)
Coach:
(France) Jean Galia

=== Third match: Rugby League selection ===
17 March 1934

Rugby League selection	32-16	France
Tries: 6 Ellaby (4), Garvey, Winter; Goals: 7 Sullivan		Tries: 4 Lambert (2), Mathon, Duhau; Goals: 2 Duhau (2)

Wilderspool Stadium, Warrington
Attendance: 11,100
Referee: J. E. Taylor (Wakefield)

Team lists:

FB	1	Jim Sullivan
WG	2	Alf Ellaby
CE	3	Fred Harris
CE	4	Ernest Winter
WG	5	Stanley Smith
FE	6	David Davies
HB	7	Jack Garvey
PR	8	Nat Silcock
HK	9	William Watson
PR	10	Albert Worrall
SR	11	Alec Troup
SR	12	George Saddington
LK	13	Patrick Dalton
Coach:

FB	1	Jean Cassagneau
WG	2	Laurent Lambert
CE	3	François Nouel
CE	4	Charles Mathon
WG	5	Antonin Barbazanges
FE	6	Joseph Carrère
HB	7	Jean-Marie Vignal
PR	8	Georges Blanc
HK	9	Maurice Porra
PR	10	Charles Petit
SR	11	Jean Duhau
SR	12	Henri Dechavanne
LK	13	Jean Galia (c)
Coach:
(France) Jean Galia

The French touring side suffered a 32–16 defeat against a selection of English rugby league players at Wilderspool Stadium in Warrington, before a crowd of approximately 11,100 spectators. According to French journalist Maurice Blein, reporting for Aujourd'hui, the match was played in difficult weather conditions, with rain falling during the latter stages. The muddy pitch suited the French forwards, who performed better than their backs, although the English side maintained a technical advantage throughout the encounter.

For the English selection, Alf Ellaby scored four tries, while Jack Garvey and Ernest Winter each added one. Jim Sullivan was particularly effective with his kicking, with Blein crediting him with 15 points. The journalist also noted the difference in goal-kicking accuracy between the two sides, reporting that Jean Duhau converted only two of his four attempts, while Jean Cassagneau missed three. Sullivan's contribution was considered decisive in establishing the final margin. Among the French players, Blein singled out Duhau as the team's best forward, ahead of Jean Galia. He also praised Charles Mathon, whom he regarded as the most consistent French player during the tour, and Laurent Lambert, who had impressed in previous matches. However, the French backs were criticised for their defensive positioning and lack of familiarity with rugby league tactics. Blein considered that the team had made progress since arriving in England, despite its continuing difficulties against more experienced opponents.

The report also addressed the future development of rugby league in France. Blein argued that the French players needed further experience and suggested that their technical shortcomings could be overcome through continued competition. He reported that officials of the English Rugby Football League were considering inviting French players to England for further training and matches, with the aim of helping to establish the sport in France.

=== Fourth match: London Highfield ===
21 March 1934

London Highfield	19-17	France
Tries: 5 Maloney (2), Hunter, Welsh; Goals: 2 Oakley (2)	1st: 11-17; 2nd: 8-0	Tries: 3 Duhau, Mathon, Galia; Goals: 4 Duhau (3), Cassagneau (1)

White City Stadium, London
Attendance: 6,000

Team lists:

FB	1
WG	2
CE	3
CE	4
WG	5
FE	6
HB	7
PR	8
HK	9
PR	10
SR	11
SR	12
LK	13
Coach:

FB	1	Jean Cassagneau
WG	2
CE	3
CE	4	Charles Mathon
WG	5
FE	6
HB	7
PR	8
HK	9
PR	10
SR	11	Jean Duhau
SR	12
LK	13	Jean Galia (c)
Coach:
(France) Jean Galia

=== Fifth match: Hull ===
24 March 1934

Hull FC	23-26	France
Tries: 5 Oliver (2), Fifield, Corner, Bowman; Goals: 4 Miller (4)		Tries: 6 Samatan (2), Vignal, Lambert, Petit, Amila; Goals: 4 Vignal (4)

The Boulevard, Hull
Attendance: 7,000

Team lists:

FB	1	Freddie Miller
WG	2	George Bateman
CE	3	Joe Oliver
CE	4	Cec Fifield
WG	5	Bob Corner
FE	6	Fred Colling
HB	7	Ernie Herbert
PR	8	Harold Bowman
HK	9	Charlie Wilkinson
PR	10	George Barlow
SR	11	Jack Dawson
SR	12	Laurie Thacker
LK	13	Andy Carmichael
Coach:
(England) Eddie Caswell

FB	1	Jean Cassagneau
WG	2	Robert Samatan
CE	3	Antonin Barbazanges
CE	4	Gaston Amila
WG	5	Laurent Lambert
FE	6	Joseph Carrère
HB	7	Jean-Marie Vignal
PR	8	Jean Duhau
HK	9	Georges Blanc
PR	10	Charles Petit
SR	11	Maurice Porra
SR	12	Henri Dechavanne
LK	13	Jean Galia (c)
Coach:
(France) Jean Galia

=== Sixth match: Salford ===
26 March 1934

Salford	35-13	France
Tries: 9 Brown (4), Hudson, Dobing, Jenkins, Day, Feetham; Goals: 4 Risman (4)		Tries: ? Goals: ?

The Willows, Salford
Attendance: 7,000

Team lists:

FB	1	Harold Osdaldestin
WG	2	Barney Hudson
CE	3	George Dobing
CE	4	Gus Risman
WG	5	Bob Brown
FE	6	Emlyn Jenkins
HB	7	Billy Watkins
PR	8	Billy Williams
HK	9	Bert Day
PR	10	Joe Bradbury
SR	11	Aubrey Casewell
SR	12	Alf Middleton
LK	13	Jack Feetham
Coach:
(New Zealand) Lance Todd

FB	1	Jean Cassagneau
WG	2	Robert Samatan
CE	3	Antonin Barbazanges
CE	4	Gaston Amila
WG	5	Laurent Lambert
FE	6	Joseph Carrère
HB	7	Jean-Marie Vignal
PR	8	Jean Duhau
HK	9	Georges Blanc
PR	10	Charles Petit
SR	11	Maurice Porra
SR	12	Henri Dechavanne
LK	13	Jean Galia (c)
Coach:
(France) Jean Galia
