= Charles Mathon =

French rugby league and union footballer (1905–1944)

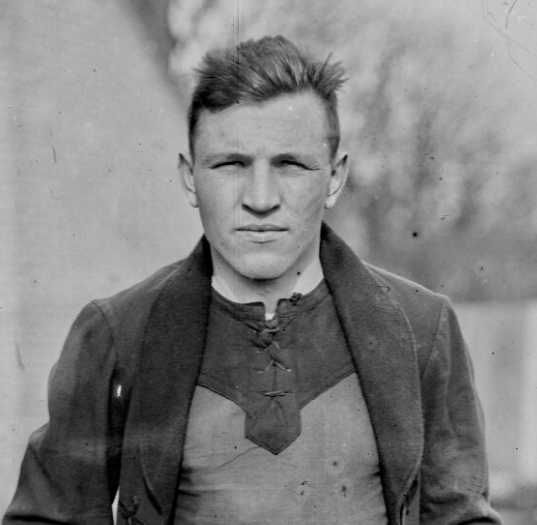
- Portrait of Charles Mathon in 1930

Personal information
- Full name: Charles Eugène Honoré Mathon
- Born: 1 December 1905 Oyonnax, France
- Died: 9 June 1944 (aged 38) Druillat, France

Playing information

Rugby union
- Position: Halfback
Club
Years	Team	Pld	T	G	FG	P
1923–30	CS Oyonnax
1930–31	US Bressane
1931–34	CS Oyonnax
	Total	0	0	0	0	0

Rugby league
- Position: Halfback
Club
Years	Team	Pld	T	G	FG	P
1934–36	US Lyon-Villeurbanne
Representative
Years	Team	Pld	T	G	FG	P
1934–34	France	1	0	0	0	0

Charles Mathon (1 December 1905 – 9 June 1944) was a French rugby union and international rugby league player during the 1920s and 1930s. Born in Oyonnax, in the Ain department, he was assassinated in Druillat during the Second World War.

A native of Oyonnax, Mathon took up rugby union at CS Oyonnax. He played as a scrum-half for nearly a decade alongside his captain, Georges Orfidan. From the age of 17, he formed a half-back partnership with Orfidan and played an important role in the club's success, helping it reach the top tier of the French rugby union championship in the late 1920s. After spending one season at US Bressane, he returned to CS Oyonnax, where he ended his rugby union career in 1934. Although frequently considered for national selection, he never earned an international cap for the French national team.

In March 1934, Mathon was approached by Jean Galia, who was introducing rugby league to France. Mathon denounced the sham amateurism prevalent in rugby union, which he had personally experienced. He subsequently joined the inaugural tour of the French rugby league side in England, known as "Les Pionniers", and took part in the French national team's first official match in April 1934. He joined the newly formed US Lyon-Villeurbanne, which he captained for two seasons, winning the Coupe de France in 1935. He retired from rugby in 1936.

During the Second World War, Mathon joined the French Resistance and helped strengthen an active Resistance network. He was assassinated in June 1944 under unclear circumstances, against a backdrop of disputes between Resistance groups. Following the war, the town of Oyonnax named its rugby stadium, the Stade Charles-Mathon, in his memory. Oyonnax Rugby continues to play there.

== Biography ==
=== Childhood, youth and rugby union career at CS Oyonnax ===
Charles Mathon was born in Oyonnax, nicknamed the "City of Combs". He was the son of Charles Mathon (1879–?), a comb factory worker, and Marie Morel (1883–1935), a housewife. He first married Gabrielle Alliata (1907–1928), a commercial employee, on 12 August 1926, and later married Marcelle Besson (1910–1995), also a commercial employee, on 28 April 1932.

==== 1923–1930: Charles Mathon's rugby union career at CS Oyonnax, leading the club to the French Championship and coming close to national selection ====
Charles Mathon grew up in Oyonnax and took up rugby union at an early age. He joined the town's leading club, the "Red Devils" of CS Oyonnax. (Note: CS Oyonnax was the original name of the club now known as Oyonnax Rugby.) He made his debut at the age of 17 as a scrum-half, replacing Gilbert Augon, the regular first-choice player in that position, who had been injured. His promising performances soon earned him a regular place in the starting team. At the time, CS Oyonnax was among the leading clubs in the Lyonnais Championship, alongside CS Vienne. From the 1923–24 season onwards, Mathon formed the team's half-back partnership with his captain and fly-half, Georges Orfidan. During this period, CS Oyonnax competed in the promotion rounds in an attempt to qualify for the French Rugby Union Championship.

During the 1924–25 season, before turning 20, Mathon succeeded G. Orfidan as captain of CS Oyonnax and successfully took charge of organising the team's play. Nevertheless, the club failed to qualify for the 1924–25 French Rugby Union Championship. That year, he also made his first appearances for representative sides, including a Haut-Jura selection bringing together leading players from FC Saint-Claude, CS Vienne, including Jean Etcheberry, and CS Oyonnax, to face the English team of Cambridge University.

In March 1926, Mathon was selected for the French Army rugby team while serving in the 47th Artillery Regiment. On this occasion, he played alongside Joseph Pascot, Yves du Manoir and Raoul Bonamy, and delivered a performance that attracted the attention of observers despite the defeat against the British Army team. In May 1926, he toured Romania with the French Army team, where he again distinguished himself and was singled out as one of the team's best players. He also represented the Lyonnais regional side in end-of-season matches, alongside leading players from Saint-Claude, CS Bourgoin-Jallieu, Lyon OU, Vienne and FC Lyon, under the captaincy of J. Etcheberry. Following these appearances, Mathon attracted interest from several clubs, notably the Parisian club Stade Français, which entered into discussions with him but did not pursue them further, as well as Stade Dijonnais.

The start of the 1926–27 season confirmed the effectiveness and influence of Oyonnax's half-back partnership, formed by C. Mathon and G. Orfidan, who were the driving force behind the team. The club increasingly produced notable performances in the Lyonnais Championship and became an increasingly formidable opponent. Oyonnax reached the final of the Lyonnais Championship in both 1926 and 1927, facing Lyon OU on each occasion. Mathon retained his status as a military international in 1927 and also played for the Longvic aviation team of the French Air Force. He was also selected for the French Army team, but withdrew following the death of his son.

The 1927–28 season brought renewed hope for CS Oyonnax, whose young home-grown players were gradually reaching maturity. Mathon was the team's leading figure, but despite his abilities being widely praised in the press, he continued to be overlooked by the selectors of the French national team. Despite a series of convincing victories, the club narrowly missed out on promotion to the French Championship season after season. Mathon subsequently criticised refereeing decisions, particularly those involving Lyon-based clubs, which resulted in a six-month suspension imposed by the Lyonnais regional committee in February 1928. This effectively ended Oyonnax's ambitions for the remainder of the season.

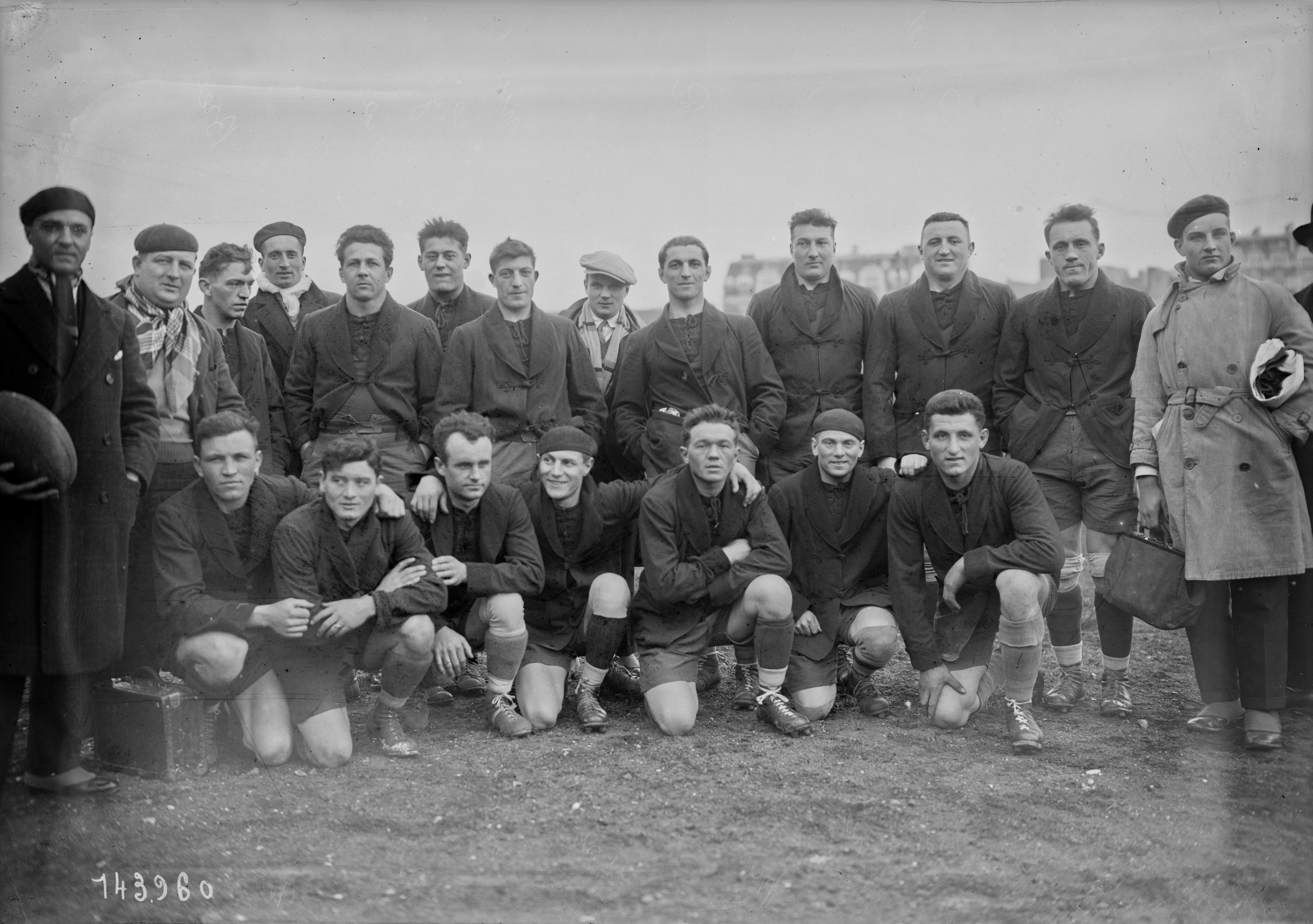
CS Oyonnax team in 1930. Charles Mathon is the first seated on the left.

Mathon returned to the field in September 1928 and remained highly regarded at national level as a scrum-half. During the 1929–30 season, CS Oyonnax finally established itself as a dominant force in the Lyonnais Championship through a series of strong performances, with Mathon regularly singled out as the best player on the pitch. He also returned to the Lyonnais representative side, where he was again praised as one of the outstanding players, initiating numerous attacking moves. Towards the end of 1929, he was called up for national selection matches, giving him an opportunity to establish himself as a potential French international.

Oyonnax continued to improve in early 1930, producing performances that attracted press attention, with the experienced half-back partnership of Mathon and G. Orfidan playing a key role. CS Oyonnax consequently qualified for the nine-team group stage of the 1929–30 French Rugby Union Championship, a first for Mathon, where they faced established clubs accustomed to national competition: CA Périgueux, RC Toulon, Stade Toulousain and Stade Français. Only the latter three progressed to the next round.

==== 1930–1931: A brief spell at US Bressane ====
For the 1930–31 season, Mathon left CS Oyonnax to join US Bressane, based in Bourg-en-Bresse, which also competed in the Lyonnais Championship. He retained his place in the Lyonnais representative side, playing a key role in the team's victory in the Coupe des Maoris. He also competed with US Bressane in the 1930–31 French Rugby Union Championship, where the club was eliminated in the five-team group stage, finishing behind SU Agen, US Dax and CS Vienne.

==== 1931–1934: Return to CS Oyonnax and another near miss with the French national team ====
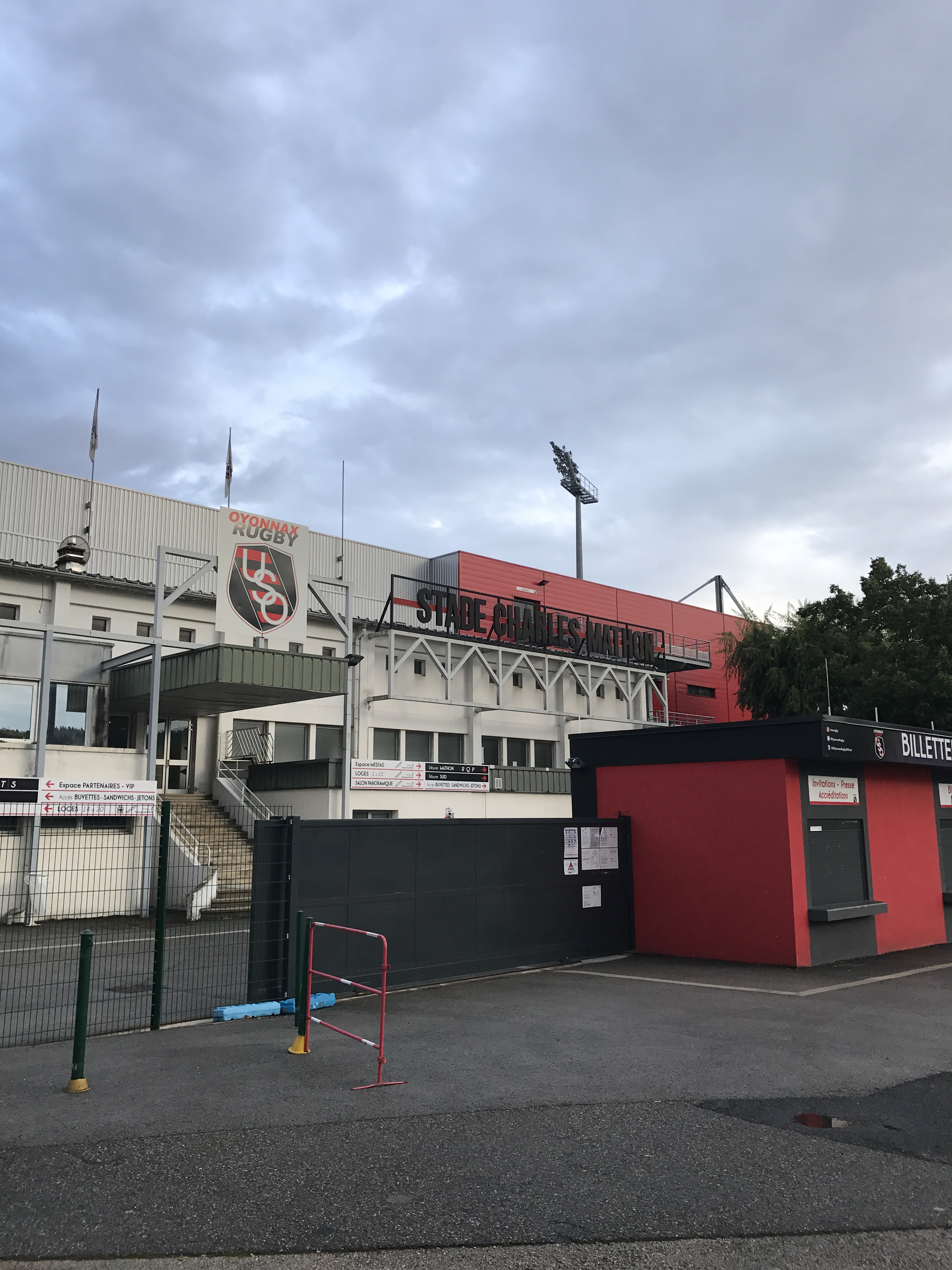
The stadium where Charles Mathon played for more than ten years in Oyonnax now bears his name: the Stade Charles-Mathon.

Charles Mathon returned to CS Oyonnax in October 1931, with the club regaining its captain after his year in Bourg-en-Bresse. The French Rugby Federation was experiencing internal divisions following the formation of the Union française de rugby amateur, which disrupted the national team. In December 1931, Mathon was called up for a French national team selection match in Clermont-Ferrand, intended to determine the starting players for 1932. (Note: These "selection matches" were friendly fixtures in which the federation's selection committee assessed numerous players to determine the fifteen who would represent France in official international matches.) The selectors decided to test him as a hooker, a position he had never previously played in his career. After struggling in this unfamiliar role during part of the match, he was moved to fly-half, where he performed more successfully. In the following match, held in Brive, he started at fly-half alongside players including Max Rousié, Jean Galia, Marius Guiral and Joseph Choy. The selectors ultimately chose the half-back partnership of Rousié and Édouard Coulon, with Mathon named as a reserve in case either player withdrew. Nevertheless, he played for a French representative XV against RC Toulon in January 1932, this time as a flanker.

Mathon enjoyed a relatively successful individual season with Oyonnax, notably helping the club defeat his former side, US Bressane, and was described as the "soul of the team". He competed in the 1931–32 French Rugby Union Championship, where Oyonnax was eliminated in the five-team group stage, facing US Thuir, US Quillan, Racing CF and FC Oloron. Meanwhile, Max Rousié started alongside Antonin Barbazanges for France against the German national team on 17 April 1932, leaving Mathon on the sidelines.

During the 1932–33 season, CS Oyonnax was increasingly referred to as "Mathon's team", while Mathon continued to be regularly singled out as the best player on the pitch. An injury towards the end of 1932 prevented him from taking part in the French national team selection matches. At club level, CS Oyonnax failed to qualify for the 1932–33 French Rugby Union Championship, having been eliminated in the Division d'Excellence, the tier immediately below the first division.

In the 1933–34 season, Charles Mathon played what would prove to be his final season with CS Oyonnax. At the beginning of the season, the club achieved a notable victory over the reigning French champions, Lyon OU, in a match marked by the absence of several players. Mathon continued to deliver strong performances throughout the season. Although he was not called up for any French national team selection matches that season, he retained the confidence of the Lyonnais regional committee. In February 1934, he represented the Lyonnais side against a French representative XV, forming the half-back partnership with Genevet and taking charge of directing the team's play. The Lyonnais side lost 12–7 to the French team. This was Mathon's final rugby union match.

=== 1934–1936: End of his rugby union career and pioneer of rugby league in France ===
==== A controversial switch to rugby league in March 1934 ====
In March 1934, Jean Galia, who had been banned by the French Rugby Union Federation, decided to establish the first French rugby league team in cooperation with the English Rugby Football League and organise a tour of England. As part of this initiative, he approached numerous players who had either been banned or had fallen foul of the rugby union establishment over the issue of sham amateurism. Having been approached by several prominent clubs, including Stade Français, during his career, Charles Mathon was familiar with these practices and shared Galia's criticism of the hypocrisy surrounding amateurism in rugby union. Galia travelled to the Lyonnais region ahead of the British tour to meet Mathon and Laurent Lambert, convincing Mathon to join the new team.

Mathon joined the side, known as "Les Pionniers", and publicly denounced the practices of French rugby union. Despite never having been selected for the French national team, he had been deployed by the national selectors as a hooker or prop in selection matches, even though, according to the press, his abilities as a scrum-half were beyond question. Mathon also revealed to the press that several Lyon-based clubs, including Lyon OU, French champions in 1932 and 1933, had offered him substantial financial advances and employment opportunities to persuade him to join them. These allegations were immediately denied by Lyon OU, which attributed its recent success to the recruitment of numerous players from southern France and surrounding areas.

==== Tour of Les Pionniers and the beginnings of rugby league ====
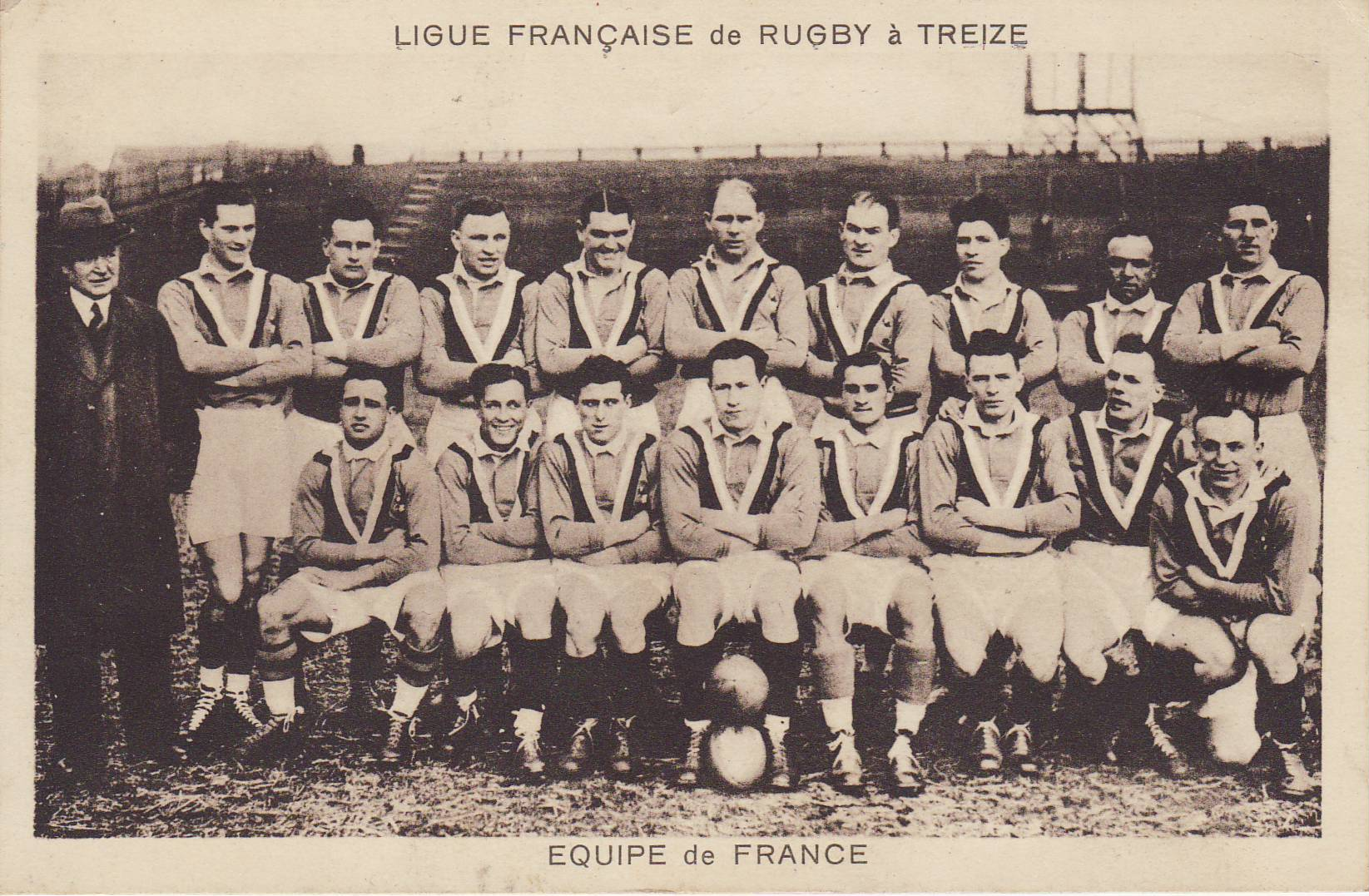
Les Pionniers, the first French rugby league team.

From 10 to 26 March 1934, the French side known as "Les Pionniers", led by Jean Galia, toured England, playing six matches against English teams in front of crowds ranging from 6,000 to 11,000 spectators. (Note: Passamar 1984, p. 129) This tour marked the beginning of the introduction of rugby league to France, with Charles Mathon among those taking part. Mathon even scored a try against a British representative side during the tour.

Following the tour, the first official match of the French national rugby league team was held against England on 15 April 1934 at the Stade Buffalo. Based on his performances during the tour, Galia selected Mathon to form the half-back partnership alongside Joseph Carrère. Despite a strong French performance, with Mathon described as excellent by the press, France lost 32–21. The match attracted considerable public and press interest, with large numbers in attendance. Mathon subsequently took part in a series of exhibition matches, known at the time as "propaganda matches", held across France, during which he developed an effective half-back partnership with Carrère.

==== Charles Mathon helps establish US Lyon-Villeurbanne, which wins the Coupe de France in its inaugural season ====
US Lyon-Villeurbanne's final French Cup victory in 1935
US Lyon-Villeurbanne 22-7 XIII Catalan
US Lyon-Villeurbanne team:

Henri Marty - Laurent Lambert, Antonin Barbazanges, René Barnoud, Gaston Amila - Robert Samatan (stand-off), Charles Mathon (scrum-half) – Lucien Lafond, Auguste Anglades, Joseph Perrin, Joseph Griffard, Paul Piany, Gustave Genevet

During the summer of 1934, US Lyon-Villeurbanne was founded, with the mayor of Villeurbanne serving as its honorary president. The club received official affiliation from the newly established French Rugby League Federation. Several players were mentioned as prospective members of the squad, with Mathon among the first named, alongside Henri Marty and Paul Piany, followed later by Robert Samatan, René Barnoud and Gustave Genevet. With the strength of its squad, US Lyon-Villeurbanne, nicknamed "Mathon's men", quickly established itself as one of the leading teams in the newly created French Rugby League Championship. Towards the end of 1934, Mathon was called up for national selection matches, although competition for places in the half-back positions was fierce, with Joseph Carrère, Max Rousié and Pierre Germineau also competing for selection. He was not selected for the matches against Wales on 1 January 1935 or England on 28 March 1935 in the 1935 European Rugby League Championship. At club level, US Lyon-Villeurbanne finished an encouraging third in the league during its inaugural season and enjoyed an unbeaten run in the Coupe de France. The club defeated RC Roanne XIII 13–0 in the quarter-finals before overcoming league leaders SA Villeneuve, featuring Max Rousié, 13–12 in the semi-final held in Bordeaux. Mathon was regularly singled out as the best player in the matches in which he appeared.

US Lyon-Villeurbanne thus reached the inaugural Coupe de France final, where they faced the formidable XIII Catalan. The match was played in appalling weather conditions, with torrential rain throughout. XIII Catalan took a 7–0 lead before Mathon scored a try for Lyon-Villeurbanne. The Lyon side then extended their lead to secure the first trophy in the club's history, winning the Coupe de France 22–7.

==== 1935–1936: Charles Mathon's final season ====
In the 1935–36 season, Charles Mathon remained with US Lyon-Villeurbanne for another year, continuing as scrum-half and captain of a team strengthened by the arrival of Charles Petit. The club performed consistently in the 1935–36 French Rugby League Championship and was joint top of Group B with RC Roanne in early February 1936. However, fatigue began to affect the players, prompting criticism from Mathon, who blamed his teammates for their lack of commitment to training. In early March, Mathon was unable to take part in the Coupe de France quarter-final because of an injury. Lyon-Villeurbanne were the defending champions, but the absence of Mathon and Laurent Lambert contributed to their elimination by Côte Basque XIII, who won 6–5. In the league championship, "Mathon's men" reached the quarter-finals, setting up a rematch against Côte Basque. In a one-sided encounter in Bordeaux, Lyon-Villeurbanne overwhelmed the Basque side 28–2, with Mathon among the try-scorers. The victory restored Mathon's confidence, and he declared: "We won the Coupe de France last season. Why shouldn't we win the Championship now?" In the semi-final at the Stade Buffalo in Montrouge, Mathon and his teammates faced Bordeaux XIII. He scored a try to give Lyon-Villeurbanne a 5–3 lead, but a late try by Marcel Villafranca secured a 6–5 victory for Bordeaux. Following the season, Lyon took part in exhibition matches in mid-April, including a fixture against an English representative side, which defeated Lyon 26–12. Mathon ended his playing career after this match. Mathon subsequently remained in Lyon, where he briefly coached the rugby union team of FC Lyon in 1937 and worked as a garage mechanic in the city.

=== Involvement in the French Resistance and assassination ===
During the Second World War, Charles Mathon joined the French Resistance through the "Sport libre" network, which was affiliated with the Forces unies de la jeunesse patriotique (United Forces of Patriotic Youth). He was responsible for the network in the southern zone of France. This network was the only organised sporting structure from which Resistance fighters emerged. On 9 June 1944, while cycling along the Route du Bourg near Pont-d'Ain, in the commune of Druillat, Ain, Mathon was stopped and then shot with bursts of machine-gun fire. He died instantly. The circumstances surrounding the ambush have never been conclusively established, and several questions remain unanswered. The most widely circulated account suggests that a group of Maquis fighters acted on a false denunciation by a man named Chanel, who allegedly identified Mathon as a Gestapo agent. Another account attributes the killing to an operation carried out by the Milice on the orders of the Gestapo.

Following the Liberation of France, the departmental Liberation Committee (Comité départemental de libération) officially rehabilitated Mathon's reputation. His assassination led to a trial in which Chanel and Jo Marin were accused of involvement. However, they were acquitted in late November 1945 in view of their records of service in the Resistance. In June 1946, two years after his death, a commemorative plaque was unveiled at the site of the killing in the presence of Henri Bourbon, a member of the French parliament representing Ain.

In tribute to the former CS Oyonnax player and Resistance member, the town's rugby stadium was named after him on 15 June 1958. The Stade Charles-Mathon remains the home ground of Oyonnax Rugby.

== Honours ==
=== Rugby union ===
==== Career statistics ====
Season		Championship	
Season		Comp.	Ran.
1923–24	(France) CS Oyonnax	French championship of 2e série	
1924–25	(France) CS Oyonnax	French championship of 2e série	
1925–26	(France) CS Oyonnax	French championship of 2e série	
1926–27	(France) CS Oyonnax	French championship of 2e série	
1927–28	(France) CS Oyonnax	French championship of 2e série	
1928–29	(France) CS Oyonnax	French championship of 2e série	
1929–30	(France) CS Oyonnax	French championship	Poule de cinq
1930–31	(France) US Bressane	French championship	Poule de cinq
1931–32	(France) CS Oyonnax	French championship of 2e série	
1932–33	(France) CS Oyonnax	French championship	Poule de neuf
1933–34	(France) CS Oyonnax	French championship	Poule de neuf

=== Rugby league ===
- Team honours:
  - Winner of the French Cup: 1935 (Lyon-Villeurbanne).

==== International games ====
Charles Mathon's international matches
	Date	Opponent	Result	Competition	Position	Points	Tries	Goals	Drops
Representing France
1.	15 April 1934	England	21–32	Test-match	Halfback	–	–	–	–

==== Career statistics ====
Season		Championship		Cup		International appearances					
Season		Comp.	Pos.	Comp.	Pos.	Comp.	M	Pts	Tr	G.	Dp.
1934–35	(France) US Lyon-Villeurbanne	French Championship	3rd	Coupe de France	Winner		1	0	0	0	0
1935–36	(France) US Lyon-Villeurbanne	French Championship	Semi-final	Coupe de France	Quarter-finals						

== Bibliography ==
=== General works ===
- Passamar, André (1984). L'Encyclopédie de Treize Magazine (in French). Toulouse: Treize Magazine. OCLC 461737232.
- Bonnery, Louis (1996). Le rugby à XIII: le plus français du monde (in French). Cano & Frank. p. 489. OCLC 45029080.
- Arcas, Denis (2019). Rugby à XIII : Il était une fois… Le rugby de Liberté: 1933–1941, de la naissance à l'interdiction (in French). Saint-Ouen: Les Éditions du Net. p. 548. ISBN 9782312065854.
