= Joseph Carrère =

France international rugby league & union player

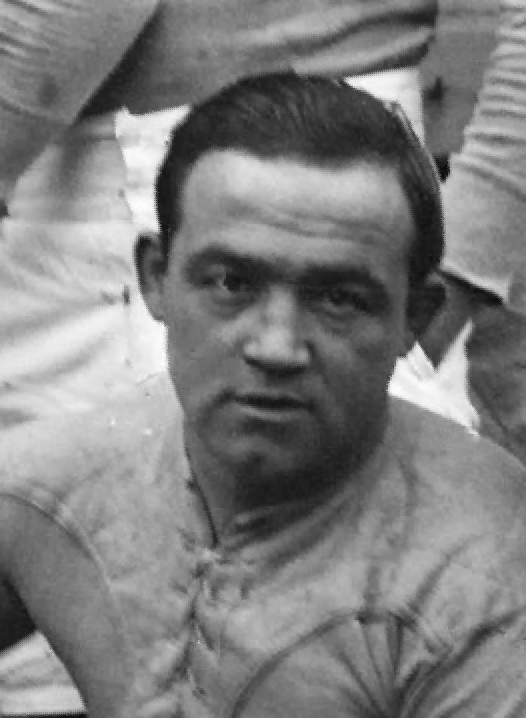
- Born: Joseph Alfred Carrère; 14 February 1904 Sigean, France
- Died: 19 October 1954 (aged 50) Mably, France
- Height: 1.66 m (5 ft 5 in)

Rugby union career
- Position(s): Scrum-half, number eight
Senior career
Years	Team	Apps	(Points)
1924–1930	RC Narbonne		
1930–1932	US Narbonne		
1933–1934	ES Port-la-Nouvelle		
- Rugby league career

Playing information
- Position: scrum-half, second-row
Club
Years	Team	Pld	T	G	FG	P
1934–38	RC Roanne
1938–39	RC Narbonne
	Total	0	0	0	0	0
Representative
Years	Team	Pld	T	G	FG	P
1934–36	France	4				0
- Military career
- Allegiance: France
- Branch: French Army
- Service years: 1940
- Conflicts: World War II; Battle of France (1940)

Joseph Carrère (14 February 1904 – 19 October 1954) was a French rugby union and rugby league player who represented France internationally in rugby league. Born in Sigean (Aude) and deceased in Mably (Loire), he played as a scrum-half or in the back row during the 1920s and 1930s.

Carrère played for RC Narbonne for many seasons, establishing himself as one of the best scrum-halves in France and reaching the semi-finals of the French Championship in 1925, where Narbonne faced eventual champions US Perpignan. Called up at short notice to the France national rugby union team in the 1928 Five Nations Championship to face the Ireland, he was unable to take up his place due to transport delays that prevented him from joining the squad before its departure for Belfast. In 1930, he took part in the formation of U.S. Narbonne, which joined the Union française de rugby amateur before merging with RC Narbonne in 1932. However, the French Rugby Federation banned Carrère, along with Robert Samatan, Richard Majérus and Charles Bigot, when he requested a transfer between the two Narbonne clubs. It took Carrère more than a year to learn the reason for his suspension, which was attributed to an incident involving a referee. He came to believe, however, that a member of the federation's disciplinary committee who was also an official of Stade Toulousain wanted to take revenge on him for refusing to sign for the club in 1932.

When rugby league was introduced to France by Jean Galia, Carrère was among the first players to join the movement, denouncing shamateurism in rugby union, and took part in the Pioneers' tour in March 1934. One of the leading figures in the French Rugby League Championship, he spent four seasons with RC Roanne, winning the Coupe de France in 1938, before returning to RC Narbonne in 1938, shortly after the club had switched to rugby league. The Second World War then broke out and rugby league was soon banned, bringing his sporting career to an end.

== Biography ==
=== Early life and beginnings in rugby union in Aude ===
Joseph Albert Carrère was born on 14 February 1904 in Sigean. His father, Frédéric Carrère (born on 27 April 1877 in Sigean and died on 20 October 1948 in Port-la-Nouvelle), was a farmer, while his mother, Thérézine Abellano (born on 17 October 1882 in Durban-Corbières and died on 5 January 1947 in Port-la-Nouvelle), had no occupation. He married Jeanne Roussoux on 5 November 1923 at Sigean town hall. He had one brother, Auguste (1906–?), and two sisters, Paule (1908–1985) and Ivette (1920–2013). Carrère worked as a garage mechanic. He played his early years of rugby at RC Narbonne.

=== 1924–30: Key player for RC Narbonne ===
==== 1924–26: A versatile and successful player ====
Born in Sigean, Joseph Carrère developed his rugby skills at RC Narbonne, a club based in the neighbouring town of Narbonne. During the 1924–25 season, he joined the club's second team before being given an opportunity at scrum-half during the season following an injury to the regular starter, Lafont. He played alongside François Clauzel and Aimé Cassayet-Armagnac, among others, and the Narbonne team came close to reaching the final of the French Championship, but were defeated 13–5 in the semi-finals by eventual winners US Perpignan, featuring Roger Ramis. According to the leading sports daily L'Auto, Carrère had "proved equal to the task".

Carrère became a regular starter for RC Narbonne from the 1925–26 season, alternating between scrum-half and number eight. RC Narbonne was now a contender for the title each season. During the 1925–26 season, the club eliminated CA Brive and Stade Châteaurenardais in a three-team group, but was eliminated by Aviron Bayonnais in the quarter-final group. Carrère attracted attention and was selected at scrum-half for the Languedoc regional committee team, which faced a Paris representative side at the end of the season.

Carrère's talent attracted offers from other clubs during the 1926 off-season, with rumours even linking him to US Perpignan, runners-up in the French Championship. However, he remained at RC Narbonne, which was strengthened by the arrival of Joseph Pascot, with whom he developed a remarkable understanding on the field, and produced several strong performances. Narbonne progressed from its five-team group, finishing ahead of US Montauban and Aviron Bayonnais, and defeated FC Lourdes in a play-off. Only US Cognac finished ahead of Narbonne, but this did not prevent the club from continuing its championship campaign. In the four-team group, however, RC Narbonne suffered a 10–8 defeat against Stade Français, preventing the club from reaching the championship semi-finals.

==== 1927–28: A missed opportunity to play for France ====
During the 1927–28 season, Joseph Carrère was put forward by the sports press and the Languedoc committee as a candidate for the France national team. An established back-row player, he also had the advantage of being able to play skilfully at scrum-half. He was subsequently called up for the France national team's preliminary selection matches in Cognac at the end of the year, where he was tested at scrum-half, and was then placed on the list of reserve players for the season in case the first-choice scrum-half became unavailable. In late January 1928, France's regular scrum-half, Clément Dupont (FC Lourdes), withdrew, while Georges Daudignon (Stade Français), who was due to undergo surgery, also withdrew from the match against the Ireland national team in the Five Nations Championship. The French Rugby Federation therefore decided to call up Carrère urgently to play at scrum-half. A telegram was sent to Narbonne asking him to join the France team in Paris before its departure for Belfast. Taking the first train from Narbonne to Lyon, Carrère was delayed for more than five hours during the journey and arrived at the federation too late to join the France team, which had already left for London before travelling on to Ireland.

In the championship, RC Narbonne was eliminated early. Despite finishing ahead of CS Palmiers and Stadoceste Tarbais in its five-team group, the club faced RC Toulon in a play-off match. Narbonne lost 15–0 and failed to qualify for the next stage, the four-team group.

==== 1928–30: Pushed towards the exit ====
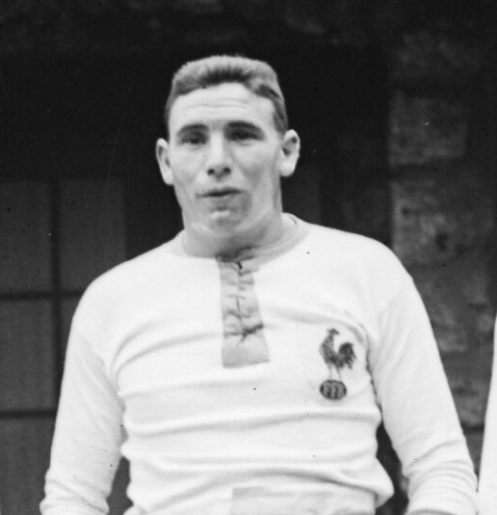
Alongside Joseph Choy, he was one of the longstanding players at RC Narbonne.

In September 1928, Carrère began his fifth season at RC Narbonne. After producing good performances at the start of the season, he nevertheless suffered a scare during the match against AS Béziers on 9 December 1928. With fifteen minutes remaining in a scoreless match, Joseph Carrère received a blow and was left unconscious on the pitch. His brother, who was also his teammate, and all the players immediately gave him first aid, while the spectators invaded the pitch. Although he regained consciousness, the referee and officials of both clubs decided to end the match immediately and postpone it to a later date. In January 1929, he returned to the pitch and once again became a key player for RC Narbonne. In a five-team group comprising US Dax, UA Libourne, USA Limoges and US Fumel, the club managed to qualify for the next stage, known as the "three-team group". Facing RC Toulon and Stade Toulousain, RC Narbonne was eliminated after failing to qualify for the quarter-finals.

The following season, 1929–30, RC Narbonne renewed a large part of its squad, with Joseph Carrère, Joseph Choy, Esquine and Canguilhem among the players retained from previous seasons. Carrère was called upon to play in various positions, including centre, without much success, before returning to scrum-half or the back row. The club qualified from its five-team group, which comprised Aviron Bayonnais, Stade Bordelais, FC Grenoble and Toulouse OEC. In the three-team group, the club from the Aude department was dominated by Stadoceste Tarbais and failed to qualify for the quarter-finals.

=== 1930–32: Move to US Narbonne and the Union française de rugby amateur ===
In August 1930, Joseph Carrère joined Narbonne's other club, US Narbonne. In September 1930, the club, led by former FC Lézignan player Louis Bès, formally joined the Union française de rugby amateur (U.F.R.A.), a sporting organisation bringing together several dissident rugby union clubs that had previously belonged to the French Rugby Union Federation (F.F.R.). Carrère distinguished himself in his new colours, notably against FC Lyon, whose squad included Maurice Porra, and also tried playing at fullback. In December, twelve members of the U.F.R.A. resigned from the French Rugby Federation and confirmed that they would not take part in the French Championship, while simultaneously launching the Tournoi des douze. US Narbonne, which did not take part in the Tournoi des douze, therefore spent the season playing friendly matches against these twelve teams. In February 1931, Carrère produced several strong performances, leading to his selection at scrum-half, a position in which he was regarded as one of the best French players, for the U.F.R.A.'s North-East representative team in an exhibition match against a South-West representative team. His performance was described as "brilliant" by the sports press. He also played several friendly matches for Stade Toulousain towards the end of the season.

The 1931–32 season finally saw US Narbonne enter the U.F.R.A. championship, known as the Tournoi des quatorze. Carrère continued to direct Narbonne's play successfully. US Narbonne had a respectable season in the championship, finishing sixth in the standings. Carrère was regularly cited as one of the key players in the squad, despite being sent off in December 1931 and receiving a two-match suspension. In February 1932, he remained one of the U.F.R.A.'s leading figures during its selection matches, in which he distinguished himself alongside Albert Domec from Carcassonne.

=== 1932–34: The "Carrère affair", banned from rugby union for over a year ===
For the 1932–33 season, the U.F.R.A. returned to the French Rugby Federation. As a result, US Narbonne agreed to merge with RC Narbonne, and their squads were also expected to merge. Joseph Carrère then requested his reinstatement at the latter club, but the disciplinary committee of the French Rugby Federation arbitrarily refused to allow him to be registered in September 1932, effectively preventing him from playing rugby union. Carrère was not the only player affected, as Robert Samatan, Richard Majérus and Charles Bigot were also named. The reasons for Carrère's suspension were initially unknown to both the player and the officials of RC Narbonne, who expressed great surprise at the decision. A month later, in mid-October 1932, the Narbonne officials contacted the federation to understand the reasons for the suspension and discovered that it was not related to an incident of professionalism, but to an incident during a match a year earlier, when Carrère was reported to have insulted a referee while playing under the authority of the U.F.R.A..

A year later, in November 1933, having received no news concerning his request for reinstatement at RC Narbonne, Carrère instead applied for registration with US Nouvelloise, stating that he would not play any matches for another club, in the hope that his situation would be resolved. The Languedoc committee granted Carrère a playing licence but came under pressure from the federation's disciplinary committee, which placed responsibility for the decision on the regional committee while stipulating that Carrère could only be reinstated with R.C. Narbonne. Thus, if the licence were maintained, the disciplinary committee would sanction the Languedoc committee, since only the federation's disciplinary committee could approve a transfer request, in this case from R.C. Narbonne to E.S. Nouvelloise. Faced with this threat, the Languedoc committee reversed its decision concerning Carrère and withdrew his licence.

Finally, on 2 December 1933, the disciplinary committee of the French Rugby Federation granted Carrère a playing licence, after he had undertaken to establish the ES Nouvelloise club and not to play for any other club, even if ES Nouvelloise were to cease to exist.

=== 1934: End of his rugby union career and pioneer of rugby league in France ===
==== The Pioneers' tour ====
Les Pionniers, the first manifestation of rugby league in France.

In late 1933, Jean Galia, who had been banned from rugby union, took the initiative to introduce rugby league in France. With this aim, he set out to persuade numerous players to join him. Joseph Carrère announced his switch to rugby league by denouncing shamateurism in rugby union, as did many other rugby union players, including numerous internationals. In February 1934, Carrère announced his support for the movement initiated by Galia and settled scores with the French Rugby Union Federation, claiming that his temporary suspension had been instigated by Mr Terré, a member of the disciplinary committee and an official of Stade Toulousain, in retaliation for his refusal to join Stade Toulousain in 1932, despite being offered a signing bonus of 15,000 francs and a monthly salary of 1,200 francs. Like Robert Samatan, he denounced instances of professionalism initiated by Stade Toulousain, despite the club having advocated amateurism for two years within the U.F.R.A., and criticised the French federation for failing to sanction professionalism as it should. His statements were welcomed by the officials of RC Narbonne, who had always regarded his suspension as an injustice. However, Stade Toulousain officials accused Samatan and Carrère of outright defamation.

For the first manifestation of rugby league in France, Jean Galia organised a tour of England by a French representative team in March 1934. Carrère was part of this team, which became known as "Les Pionniers" ("The Pioneers"), alongside some of the leading rugby union players of the time who, having been banned, wished to denounce shamateurism in rugby union and make the most of their rugby talents, including Robert Samatan, Jean Duhau, Charles Mathon and Charles Petit. The tour helped launch the rugby league movement in France, leading to the creation of numerous clubs and the establishment of a French Championship from the autumn of 1934.

==== 1934–38: Key player for R.C. Roanne ====
===== 1934–35: First season and success in rugby league =====
At the start of the 1934–35 season, Joseph Carrère left Narbonne and signed for the Loire-based club RC Roanne, whose squad included former rugby union internationals Charles Petit and Jean Duhau. RC Roanne was founded by Mr Place with the assistance of former international Charles Petit. The latter succeeded in recruiting numerous leading rugby union players, including Jean Rolland, Jean Duhau, André Hiriart and Henri Dechavanne. At the end of 1934, Carrère was selected for the France national team but did not secure a starting place at his position, with Pierre Germineau preferred instead to face Wales in the inaugural European Nations Cup.

Joseph Carrère's second appearance for France
France 15–15 England
France team:

Marius Guiral – Aimé Bardes, François Noguères, Max Rousié, Robert Samatan – Roger Lanta (stand-off), Joseph Carrère (scrum-half) – Jean Duhau, Maurice Porra, Jean Galia (captain), André Rousse, Roger Claudel, Louis Brané

Selector: Jean Galia

For the second European Nations Cup match against England, the selector, Jean Galia, again put Germineau and Carrère in competition for the scrum-half position. This time, the Narbonne-born player prevailed over Germineau in a selection match on 17 February 1935 in Bayonne and was partnered with the Pau stand-off Roger Lanta. Galia chose him because he had already faced English players during previous tours, notably his English opposite number Tommy McCue. The match was closely contested and ended in a 15–15 draw. Carrère was recognised for the quality of his tackling and played an active part in securing the result.

In the inaugural French Championship, Carrère's RC Roanne remained in the upper half of the standings and finished fourth behind champions SA Villeneuve, led by Jean Galia, Bordeaux XIII and US Lyon-Villeurbanne. In the Coupe de France, RC Roanne faced neighbouring US Lyon-Villeurbanne in its opening match. The match was interrupted at half-time when Carrère's teammates withdrew in protest against the refereeing decisions. Roanne was subsequently declared to have lost the match, allowing Lyon to qualify for the next round. Carrère ended his season with a prestigious match against a combined Welsh-English team, making way for Germineau at half-time.

===== 1935–36: Carrère, France's leading scrum-half =====
For the 1935–36 season, RC Roanne established itself as a serious contender for national titles, relying on the arrivals of Eugène Chaud, the British players Jones and Pearce, and Huc from Montluçon. Carrère was considered one of the leaders of the Roanne team and, despite his "rounded build" and advancing years, the sports journalists of L'Auto praised his talent, comparing him to "fine wine". At the end of October, Carrère was called up for a France selection match against a team known as the "Rest", starting at scrum-half alongside R. Lanta at stand-off, in preparation for the match against Wales on 23 November 1935. His main rival for the scrum-half position was the Paris player P. Germineau. He confirmed his form in his team's 56–45 victory in this selection match, but his designated partner at stand-off was Étienne Cougnenc, with whom he combined well. Ahead of this first match of the 1935–36 European Nations Cup, Carrère was among the candidates to be appointed captain of the France national team following Jean Galia's retirement from playing. Galia nevertheless remained the team's selector, but Max Rousié was ultimately given the captaincy. France suffered a heavy 41–7 defeat in Llanelli, and many French players, including Carrère, were harshly criticised. Despite this poor performance, Carrère remained the first-choice scrum-half, this time ahead of Pierre Brinsolles.

Joseph Carrère's fourth and final appearance for France
France 7–25 England
France team:

Marius Guiral – Étienne Cougnenc, Georges Caussarieu, François Noguères, René Barnoud – Max Rousié (stand-off), Joseph Carrère (scrum-half) – Charles Petit, Maurice Porra, André Bruzy, Jean Galia (captain), Joseph Griffard, Louis Brané

Selector: Jean Galia

In the French Championship, RC Roanne, led by Carrère in the absence of captain Jean Duhau, who was sidelined for four months between October and February following a car accident, enjoyed a season in which the club competed for the leading positions and even occupied first place in January 1936. In February 1936, Carrère made his fourth and final appearance for France, selected at scrum-half alongside Max Rousié at stand-off to face England on 16 February 1936. France were defeated 25–7 and finished last in the competition. Carrère, without having performed poorly, lost his place in the France team, which was seeking to rebuild and rejuvenate its starting thirteen for the coming months.

RC Roanne's end to the season gave the club hope of reaching a final. The club finished top of its group in the championship ahead of neighbouring US Lyon-Villeurbanne and RC Albigeois, before eliminating Paris rugby XIII 19–13 in the quarter-finals. At the same time, Roanne defeated XIII Catalan 3–0 in the Coupe de France quarter-finals. Having qualified for the semi-finals of both competitions, RC Roanne lost both matches. The club was beaten 10–0 by Côte Basque XIII in the Coupe de France semi-final, and also lost 14–12 to XIII Catalan in the championship semi-final.

===== 1936–37: The versatile player =====
For the 1936–37 season, RC Roanne, led by president C. Devernois, maintained the same ambitions as in previous seasons, positioning itself as a contender for national titles. With this in mind, the squad underwent few changes and Joseph Carrère retained the confidence of his captain Jean Duhau, while two English players, Evans and Hazlehurst, joined to strengthen the squad. Carrère, who had played as a scrum-half and in the back row in previous years, was tried on several occasions in a new role as fullback from this season onwards and was described as RC Roanne's "jack-of-all-trades".

At the halfway point of the season in January 1937, RC Roanne occupied one of the top three places in the French Championship standings and continued to confirm its ambitions match after match. Carrère played an active part, being cited as one of the leading players in the Roanne team alongside Max Rousié, Henri Gibert and Jean Duhau. In the Coupe de France, RC Roanne eliminated Périgueux XIII in the round of 16 but lost 12–10 to XIII Catalan in the quarter-finals following a drop goal by François Noguères. In the championship, the club from the Loire department finished third in the regular season standings and faced Bordeaux XIII, featuring Raoul Bonamy and Henri Audurau, in the semi-finals. Played in Roanne, the match ended in a 21–10 victory for Bordeaux XIII, whose players appeared superior to those of Roanne in every aspect of the game.

===== 1937–38: Final season at Roanne and Coupe de France victory =====
During the 1937 off-season, RC Roanne underwent a major overhaul of its squad, retaining only a few players from the previous season, including Joseph Carrère, Max Rousié, Eugène Chaud and Charles Lamarque. The brothers Robert and Jean Dauger, Sylvain Claverie-Barbe, Vincent Martimpé-Gallart, Robert Samatan and Joseph Griffard were among the players brought in to strengthen RC Roanne and help the club finally win a long-coveted national title. Carrère remained an option for the France national team considered by selector Jean Galia, but the latter preferred to rely on the versatility of his Roanne teammate Max Rousié. RC Roanne fielded its highly talented team at stadiums across the country and confirmed the high expectations placed upon it by remaining at the top of, or within reach of first place in, the French Championship. However, with a squad containing a large number of talented players, Carrère found himself among the substitutes on several occasions.

In January 1938, RC Roanne faced the Australian national team, which was touring Europe. The Australians won 20–13, but Carrère, playing in the back row, was singled out as his team's best player despite his age. At the end of January, the two leading teams in the championship, US Lyon-Villeurbanne and RC Roanne, met in Lyon. The match ended in an 11–7 victory for Lyon, whose team spirit prevailed over the "collection of star players". During the match, Carrère was sent off for fighting.

1938 Coupe de France title
RC Roanne 36–12 SA Villeneuve
Roanne team:

Léopold Servole – Charles Lamarque, Max Rousié, Jean Dauger, Jean Bellan – Robert Samatan (stand-off, captain), Robert Dauger (scrum-half) – Louis Gibert, Vincent Martimpé-Gallart, Henri Gibert, Joseph Griffard, Paul Piany, Joseph Carrère

As the season drew to a close, RC Roanne confirmed the ambitions placed upon the team at the beginning of the season. In the Coupe de France, the club from the Loire department eliminated Bègles in the round of 16, Toulouse Olympique in the quarter-finals and XIII Catalan in the semi-finals. In the French Championship, RC Roanne finished second in the regular season and eliminated XIII Catalan in the quarter-finals, but its hopes of a Championship–Cup double were ended in the semi-finals by SA Villeneuve, which won 3–2 in Bordeaux. In the Coupe de France final the following week, Roanne faced the same opponents who had eliminated them from the championship. Roanne gained emphatic revenge by defeating Villeneuve 36–12 on 8 May 1938 at the Stade des Minimes in Toulouse, in front of more than 10,000 spectators. Carrère, alongside Robert Samatan, Max Rousié, Joseph Griffard and Jean Dauger, initiated decisive attacks and distinguished themselves as the team scored eight tries. It was RC Roanne's first title.

==== End of career at RC Narbonne following its switch to rugby league ====
For the 1938–39 season, two clubs from the Aude department decided to switch rugby codes and become rugby league clubs: AS Carcassonne and RC Narbonne. To begin its first season, RC Narbonne, which was admitted directly into the first division of the championship, called upon its former player Joseph Carrère, whose role was to introduce the Narbonne players, such as Francis Vals, Pierre Escaffre and Eugène Boyer, to the subtleties of rugby league.

RC Narbonne's beginnings with Carrère were far from disappointing for newcomers to the sport, as the club occupied sixth place in the championship standings after eight rounds in mid-November 1938. However, as the season progressed, RC Narbonne gradually slipped down the standings, struggling to avoid finishing last, a position occupied by Pau XIII. Carrère met his former Roanne teammates again in February 1939 at Narbonne, but an incident during the match prevented a happy reunion when René Arotça struck Carrère, sparking a brawl on the pitch that forced Mr Devernois, president of RC Roanne, to intervene to calm the situation. The Roanne players accused Carrère of poor behaviour from the beginning of the match.

A month later, in March 1939, Carrère was again at the centre of controversy during a match against SA Villeneuve in Albi in the round of 16 of the Coupe de France: a disrespectful remark he made to the referee, Mr Chavannes, led to his sending-off. He was defended by his coach Eugène Ribère, who reported to the French Rugby League that the referee had made insulting remarks that provoked the incident, while also recalling incidents involving Carrère dating back three or four years. There is no mention of any sanction against Carrère. The season ended with R.C. Narbonne in twelfth place (Note: This was R.C. Narbonne's only season in rugby league. When the Second World War broke out, the Vichy regime banned rugby league and forced all rugby league clubs to return to rugby union. After the war and the revival of rugby league, R.C. Narbonne remained loyal to rugby union.).

=== After his career ===
Joseph Carrère's career, at the age of 35, came to an end during the 1939–40 season, as the Second World War was about to break out, leading to the suspension of the championship and the mobilisation of numerous players in September 1939. For many, this brought their sporting careers to an end, before rugby league was banned in France in 1940 by the Vichy regime.

Called up for military service in the French armed forces, Carrère was seriously wounded in combat in May 1940 and had to have an arm amputated. Having returned to the Roanne area after the war, he died on 19 October 1954 in Mably (Loire).

== Honours ==
=== Rugby union ===
==== Career statistics ====
Season		Championship	
Season		Comp.	Ran.
1924–25	(France) RC Narbonne	French championship	Semi-final
1925–26	(France) RC Narbonne	French championship	Quarter-final pool
1926–27	(France) RC Narbonne	French championship	Poule of four
1927–28	(France) RC Narbonne	French championship	Poule of five
1928–29	(France) RC Narbonne	French championship	Poule of three
1929–30	(France) RC Narbonne	French championship	Poule of three
1930–31	(France) US Narbonne	No championship (Note: US Narbonne joined the U.F.R.A. during the season, but too late to enter the Tournoi des douze, and therefore played only friendly matches throughout the season.)	
1931–32	(France) US Narbonne	Tournoi des quatorze	6th
1932–33	Joseph Carrère was suspended by the French Rugby Federation until December 1933.		
1933–34	(France) E.S. Port-la-Nouvelle	Withdrawn	

=== Rugby league ===
- Team honours:
  - Winner of the French Cup: 1938 (Roanne).

==== European Nations Cup ====
Details of Carrère's European Nations Cup career
Edition	Rank	France results	Carrère's results	Carrère's matches
1935	2nd	1 W, 1 D, 0 L	0 W, 1 D, 0 L	1/2
1936	3rd	0 W, 0 D, 2 L	0 W, 0 D, 2 L	2/2

==== International games ====
Joseph Carrère's international matches
	Date	Opponent	Result	Competition	Position	Points	Tries	Goals	Drops
Representing France
1.	15 April 1934	England	21–32	Test-match	Halfback	–	–	–	–
2.	28 March 1935	England	15–15	European Nations Cup	Halfback	–	–	–	–
3.	23 November 1935	Wales	7–41	European Nations Cup	Halfback	–	–	–	–
4.	16 February 1936	England	7–25	European Nations Cup	Halfback	–	–	–	–

==== Career statistics ====
Season		Championship		Cup		International appearances					
Season		Comp.	Pos.	Comp.	Pos.	Comp.	M	Pts	Tr	G.	Dp.
1934–35	(France) RC Roanne	French Championship	4th	Coupe de France	Quarter-finals	European Nations Cup	2	0	0	0	0
1935–36	(France) RC Roanne	French Championship	Semi-final	Coupe de France	Semi-final	European Nations Cup	2	0	0	0	0
1936–37	(France) RC Roanne	French Championship	Semi-final	Coupe de France	Quarter-finals						
1937–38	(France) RC Roanne	French Championship	Semi-final	Coupe de France	Winner						
1938–39	(France) RC Narbonne	French Championship	12th	Coupe de France	Round of 16						

== Bibliography ==
- Passamar, André (1984). L'Encyclopédie de Treize Magazine [The Encyclopedia of Treize Magazine] (in French). Toulouse: Treize Magazine. OCLC 461737232.
- Bonnery, Louis (1996). Le rugby à XIII : le plus français du monde [XIII rugby: the most French in the world] (in French). Cano & Frank. OCLC 45029080.
- Arcas, Denis (2019). Rugby à XIII : Il était une fois … Le rugby de Liberté : 1933-1941, de la naissance à l'interdiction [Rugby à XIII: Once upon a time... Freedom Rugby: 1933-1941, from birth to banning] (in French). St. Ouen: Les Éditions du Net. ISBN 9782312065854.
- Roanne (2004). Rugby XIII - 1934-2004 - 70 ans [XIII Rugby - 1934-2004 - 70 years] (in French). France Graphic.
