= Maurice Porra =

France international dual-code rugby player

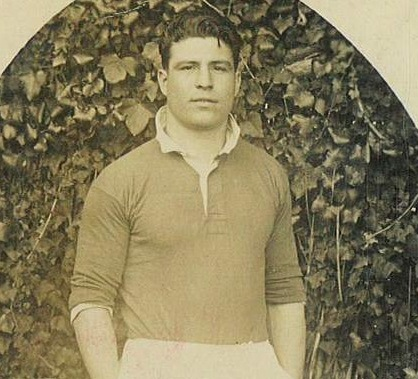

Personal information
- Born: Maurice Séverin Porra; 12 May 1906 Perpignan, France
- Died: 2 September 1950 (aged 44) Perpignan, France

Playing information
- Height: 1.70 m (5 ft 7 in)

Rugby union
- Position: Hooker
Club
Years	Team	Pld	T	G	FG	P
1927–29	FC Lézignan
1929–31	FC Lyon
	Total	0	0	0	0	0
Representative
Years	Team	Pld	T	G	FG	P
1930	France

Rugby league
- Position: Second-row, Hooker
Club
Years	Team	Pld	T	G	FG	P
1934–35	SA Villeneuve
1936–39	XIII Catalan
	Total	0	0	0	0	0
Representative
Years	Team	Pld	T	G	FG	P
1934–37	France	8

Coaching information

Rugby union
Club
Years	Team	Gms	W	D	L	W%
1940–45	Stade Aurillacois
1949–50	Céret Sportif
	Total	0	0	0	0

Rugby league
Club
Years	Team	Gms	W	D	L	W%
1945–47	XIII Catalan

Maurice Porra, born on May 1906, in Perpignan (Pyrénées-Orientales) and died on September 2, 1950, in the same town, was both a French international rugby union & league player, who played hooker in the 1920s and 1930s.

Trained as a rugby union player at the Stade athlétique Perpignanais, Maurice Porra went on to play for F.C. Auch and then F.C. Lézignan, reaching the French championship final in 1929, losing to U.S. Quillan. Following this final, F.C. Lézignan was suspended for a year by the French Rugby XV Federation, forcing Mr. Porra to join F.C. Lyon. He became a benchmark hooker and was selected for the French team against Ireland shortly before France's ban from the Five Nations Tournament. This selection had serious consequences for Mr. Porra, who was forced by the Federation to leave F.C. Lyon, which then declared itself a dissident club of the French Federation and launched the Union française de rugby amateur. After some hesitation and contradictory statements, he gave in and joined S.U. Agen just after his selection, but his rugby license was withdrawn. He played no matches for S.U. Agen between 1931 and 1933, when he returned to Perpignan, as the Federation upheld his deregistration.

In January 1934, at Jean Galia's invitation, he took part in the first French XIII rugby event, the Pioneers tour. From then on, he played XIII rugby. At the start of the 1934-1935 season, he became one of the stars of the French championship, signing for SA Villeneuve and winning the first edition of the 1935 French championship with Galia, Max Rousié, and Marius Guiral. He later joined the XIII Catalan de Perpignan and added a new title to his list of honours, the Coupe de France in 1939. At the same time, he also became a French international, taking part in the 1935, 1936, and 1937 editions of the European Cup of Nations.

Mobilized by the Second World War, which put an end to his sporting career, Porra subsequently became coach, first of RC Catalan (the name given to the XIII Catalan in the Quinzist version following the ban on XIII rugby) and then of Stade Aurillacois, before returning to Perpignan and the XIII Catalan when the war ended. He then coached Céret Sportif in XV rugby.

== Beginnings in rugby ==
=== 1927-1929: departure for F.C. Lézignan and French championship final ===
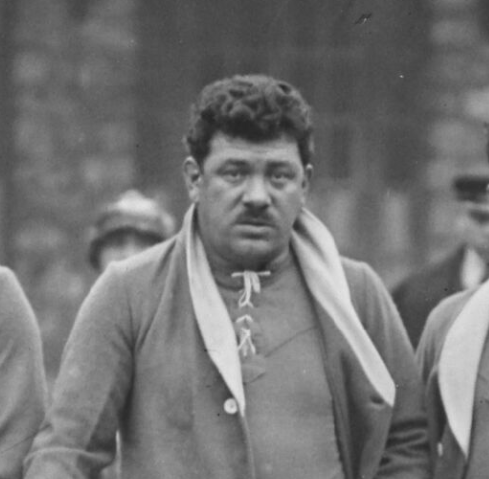
Jean Sébédio, his coach at F.C. Lézignan, took him to the final of the 1929 French Championship.

Maurice Porra joined F.C. Lézignan at the start of the 1927-1928 season, captained and coached by Jean Sébédio, a former French international, and partnered by Léopold Fabre. He played in his preferred position: hooker. The club competes in the French Championship this season, and finds itself in Pool G alongside Racing C.F., Stade Bordelais, U.S. Montauban, and C.A. Brive. The club did well, but failed to qualify for the four-team pool phase after losing the qualifying play-off match to Stade Bordelais 9-0.

The 1928-1929 season was more promising, with J. Sébédio no longer a player but still the coach of this Aude-based team. The club surprised everyone with a series of victories, first halted by U.S. Quillan, last runners-up in the French Championship, and then by A.S. Béziers in November 1928. That season, Porra demonstrated his qualities as a hooker, gradually establishing himself as one of France's leading players, and was already the subject of rumors about a possible move to a more prestigious club the following year. In February 1929, he was called up to the French national team for the first time as a replacement hooker in the event of Fernand Camicas's defection, to face Wales and then England in the Five Nations Tournament.

As the season progresses, F.C. Lézignan emerges as a serious outsider in the French Championship, where M. Porra shines as the headliner of the forwards. Over the course of the season, the club beat other contenders such as S.C. Mazamet, Stadoceste tarbais, U.S. Perpignan, Racing C.F., and S.U. Agen. With limited resources, the team's strength was limited, and it was the subject of an unflattering reputation inflicted by defeated teams, denouncing the chauvinism of its fans, the brutality of its players and the partiality of referees during home matches at the Stade du Moulin. On the other hand, the team is praised by many of its opponents when it plays on its home ground, where it is appreciated for its open, mobile play and confident scrummaging. F.C. Lézignan dominated the five-team pool and then the three-team pool ahead of F.C. Grenoble and Boucau Stade to qualify for the quarter-finals of the Championship.

In the quarter-finals, F.C. Lézignan faced Stade Bordelais at Toulouse's Stade des Ponts-Jumeaux, and at this stage of the competition were considered major title contenders due to the team's excellent preparation for the end of the season. Lézignan came out on top, winning 27-5. M. Porra's performance was noticed and his name was once again put forward for inclusion in the French team XV to face Germany at the end of the season, as was that of his team-mate André Clady, but he remained a substitute and was preferred to Georges Vaills. In the semi-finals of the Championship, the Audois club faced A.S. Béziers in Carcassonne, while the other semi-final pitted U.S. Quillan against S.U. Agen, giving the Languedoc committee three qualifiers for the semi-finals. The semi-final, played on the Pépinière pitch in front of 15,000 spectators, was a tight affair, and it was only after extra time (6-6 at the end of normal time) that Lézignan won 9-6 thanks to a final try from Célestin Wisser to qualify for the first final in its history and face U.S. Quillan in a 100% Audoise final. The date of the final was the subject of debate, with Quillan wishing it to be played on May 19 and Lézignan wanting it to be postponed until May 26 to allow their players to recuperate. In the end, the first option was chosen by the French Federation. The final, played in Toulouse against Jean Galia and Eugène Ribère's U.S. Quillan, was marred by a number of brawls that played havoc with the game, to the great displeasure of the spectators. In this match, F.C. Lézignan led 8-0 after 45 minutes, before collapsing at the end of the game to let Quillan win 11-8. A few weeks later, in mid-July 1929, the board of the French Rugby Federation voted to exclude F.C. Lézignan from the French Championship for one year, on the grounds of the brutality of the club's players in the final. These events precipitated the departure of Mr. Porra, who signed for F.C. Lyon.

=== 1929-1934: Arrival at F.C. Lyon, French international then retirement from rugby union ===
Maurice Porra joins F.C. Lyon for the 1929-1930 season in a team that does not play a leading role in the French Championship. Despite his contribution, the Lyon club was eliminated in the five-team pool, outclassed by C.A. Bègles, A.S. Béziers, and Section paloise. His name was no longer mentioned as a potential selection for the French national team, but he was called up to the Lyonnais squad during the season, where he rubbed shoulders with Charles Mathon, Henri Dechavanne, and Vincent Graule.

Mr. Porra began the 1930-1931 season with F.C. Lyon under the same constraints, but his name was once again mentioned to the French selectors. The only F.C. Lyon player named, he received a call-up for a selection match in December 1930 in Dax, where he was one of the potential first-teamers for the Five Nations Tournament match against Ireland scheduled for January 1, 1931. But in spite of himself, in December 1930 he found himself indirectly involved in the scandal that was shaking up French rugby union, when twelve clubs split from the French Championship to create a parallel championship called the “Tournoi des douze”, and form the Union française de rugby amateur to denounce violence and brown amateurism in France. Among these twelve clubs was M. Porra's F.C. Lyon, which had sent its resignation to the F.F.R. that month. Despite this, on December 22, 1930, M. Porra was confirmed as hooker to play against Ireland but on the sole condition imposed by the F.F.R. that he leave his club, F.C. Lyon. After some prevarication on the part of Mr. Porra, the F.F.R. announced that he had resigned from his club and would play against Ireland.

Played at the Stade Yves-du-Manoir, the match was won by France, 3-0 thanks to a try from Eugène Ribère. Porra, celebrating his first cap, was hailed by his team-mates for his heeling performance. In the following days, on January 6, 1931, Mr. Porra played in a match with F.C. Lyon that caused a major controversy within the French Federation, which demanded explanations from the player. Mr. Porra confirms that he will remain with F.C. Lyon while making himself available to the French national team, but is refused by the Federation, who will no longer call him up to the national team as long as he is with F.C. Lyon.

Finally, in February 1931, Porra decided to leave F.C. Lyon and join S.U. Agen. However, he was unable to play for the French Championnat 1 team, due to a federal decision prohibiting a player from a dissident club linked to the UFRA from joining a federal club during the season. He therefore waited until the summer and the start of the 1931-1932 season to apply for his new license, but his application was refused by the French Rugby Federation in XV. As a result, he had to sit out the 1931-1932 season, followed by a second one in 1932-1933. In the summer of 1933, he decided to return to his home town of Perpignan and applied for a license with U.S.A. Perpignan. He waited for his license to be validated, but it never came, and he never played an official match, only coaching S.O. Perpignan.

At the beginning of 1934, he was finally approached by Jean Galia, a former French international who had been struck off by the French Rugby Federation of XV for acts of professionalism, to import the XIII rugby code to France. Mr. Porra responded positively to this invitation, and in March 1934 took part in the tour of a French selection called Les Pionniers.

=== 1934: pioneering XIII rugby in France ===
==== Pioneers tour ====
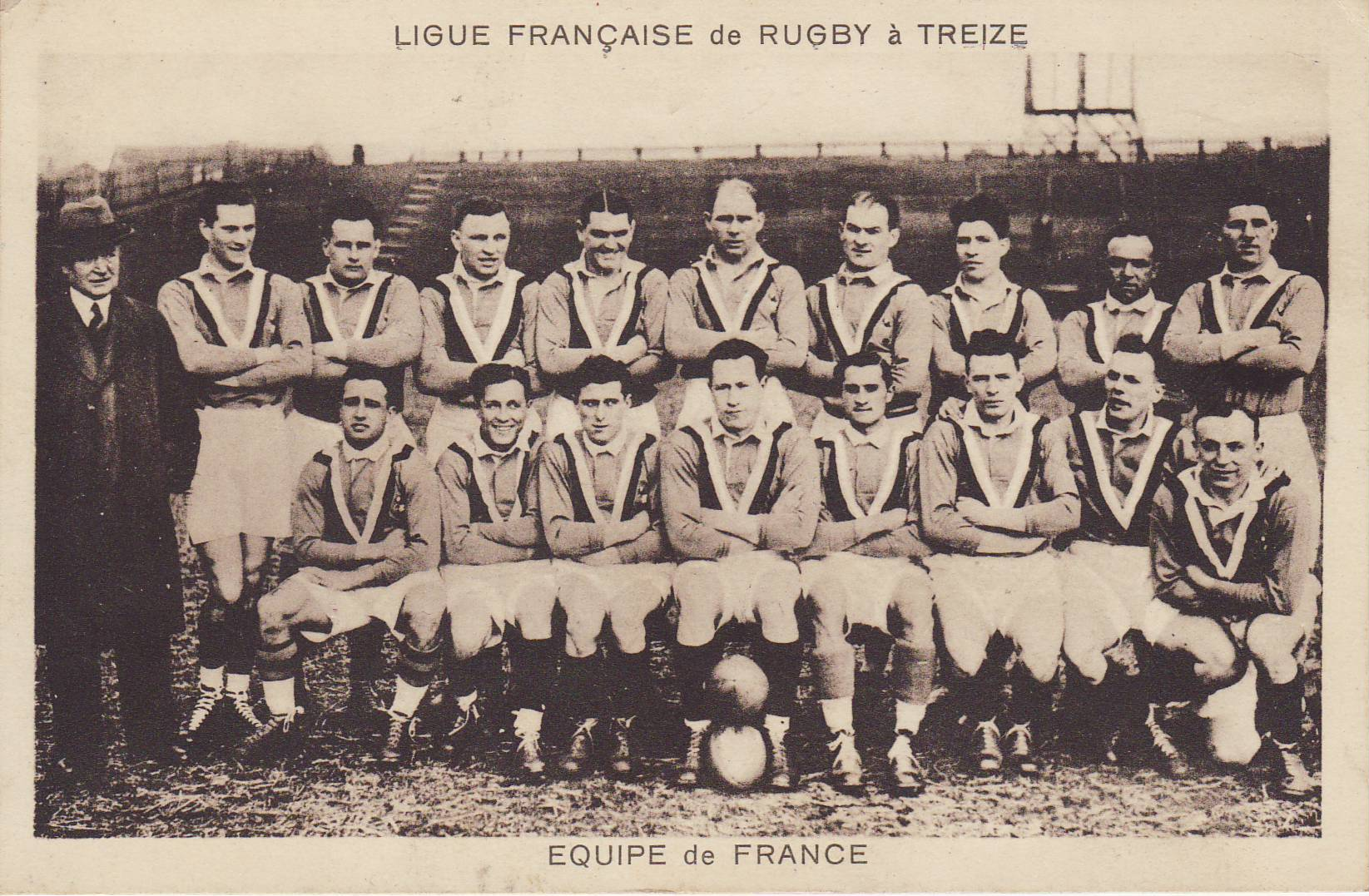
Les Pionniers, France's premier rugby à XIII event.

In March 1934, Jean Galia, who had been banned from the French Rugby XV Federation, succeeded in setting up the first XIII rugby team in France, in conjunction with the English Rugby XIII Federation. In the process, he contacted a number of players who had been banned or had fallen foul of the XV rugby system due to brown amateurism. Maurice Porra, who had been canvassed by top clubs such as S.U. Agen, which he joined in 1931 for a fee, heard and shared the same arguments about this general hypocrisy. He is persuaded by J. Galia. M. Porra joins this team, then called “Les Pionniers”, and expresses his satisfaction at having taken part in this tour, where he meets up with his former team-mate from Lézignan, Léopold Fabre, and Robert Samatan, whom he had met in Agen.

From March 10 to 26, 1934, this French team, called “Les Pionniers” and led by Jean Galia, toured England, playing six matches against English teams in front of an audience of between 6,000 and 11,000 spectators. This event marked the start of the integration of rugby à XIII in France, with Maurice Porra taking part. On the return from this tour, the first official match between the French XIII rugby team and England was organized on April 15, 1934, at the Buffalo stadium. In view of his performance on this tour, J. Galia fielded M. Porra as hooker, surrounded by prop Georges Blanc and prop Charles Petit. Despite a good French performance, France was defeated 32-21. He then takes part in “propaganda” matches across France.

==== 1934-1936: Villeneuve period ====
===== 1934-1935: French and international XIII champion =====
Jean Galia launches the French XIII rugby championship and builds the S.A. Villeneuve team around it. To launch the club's transition to XIII rugby, he organized a tour of England for the team, including players from the south of France such as Maurice Porra, who responded positively to the invitation, as did Marcel Daffis and François Noguères. Despite the creation of the XIII Catalan based in Perpignan, Mr. Porra decided to settle in Villeneuve-sur-Lot and play the 1934-1935 Championship on the banks of the Lot.

At the same time, in conjunction with the English and Welsh, it was decided to create a new competition between France, Wales, and England, called the European Nations Cup. France was to face Wales in Bordeaux on January 1, 1935. A selection match between thirty players was organized in Perpignan to determine the players selected. M. Porra was one of the thirty players selected for the match, and from the pre-selection stage was considered the best French hooker. M. Porra therefore lined up in the XIII de France alongside Villeneuve team-mates Max Rousié, Marius Guiral and J. Galia. The match was a real success, played in front of almost 18,000 spectators and a number of VIPs including the deputy mayor of Bordeaux, Adrien Marquet. France surprised their opponents and recorded the first victory in their history, with a score of 18-11.

France's second match in the European Cup was against England on March 28, 1935. Mr. Porra had no real challenger for the position of hooker, and this was his third selection. Surrounded by André Rousse and Jean Duhau, he formed the front line for this match. The French defense, under pressure throughout the match, held the French to a 15-15 draw in front of a crowd of over 20,000. England won the European Cup, but France demonstrated its success in building a world-class XIII rugby team in less than a year.

In the Championship, S.A. Villeneuve led the way throughout the season, beating all opponents except Bordeaux XIII. However, this success contrasted with a surprise 13-12 semi-final defeat by U.S. Lyon-Villeurbanne in Bordeaux, during which M. Porra was sent off. Porra was sent off, and prevented the Villeneuve club from achieving the Coupe-Championnat double. In the latter, S.A. Villeneuve won the first French Championship title in history, beating Bordeaux XIII and U.S. Lyon-Villeurbanne by just three defeats to fifteen wins, in the only edition in which no final phase was organized. M. Porra was one of the players who won the title, playing hooker for the whole season in a club presided over by M. Bordeneuve and coached by J. Galia. Meanwhile, he played in a prestigious match against the British Empire as part of King George V's Silver Jubilee in Leeds, which France lost 25-18.

==== 1935-1936: second season at S.A. Villeneuve ====
For the 1935-1936 season, Maurice Porra extended his stay at S.A. Villeneuve to defend the title he had won the previous season, still under the guidance of Jean Galia. The French Championship was divided into two pools, with S.A. Villeneuve in Pool A, where they faced Bordeaux XIII, Côte Basque XIII, Paris Rugby XIII, Pau XIII and Dax XIII. Porra takes advantage of the start of the season to write in the sports press, including L'Auto, about his period of ban from playing rugby à XV, imposed by the French Rugby Federation in XV, from his international selection against Ireland on January 1, 1931, until March 1934, when he joined the first French rugby à XIII team. He declares: “What a punishment this forced abstention is. How happy I am to be able to play again. Especially since Rugby League rules allow athletes to enjoy themselves even more “than when they were fifteen”. You can't imagine how happy I am to be able to continue playing the sport I love so much. What a denial of those who, at the time of my suspension, claimed that I was finished!".

At the start of the season, he experienced a lack of form in the Villeneuve jersey, sometimes being replaced by Rabot, and was not called up to play against Wales in November 1936, allowing Dacquois hooker Georges Lavielle to win his first cap. However, he returned to the forefront in January 1936, as did his club, and regained his place in the French team for the match against England in February 1936, where M. Porra was cited as one of the best players in the French squad. France were soundly beaten 25-7 in the match, but most of the players praised the work of these Englishmen as an example for the future, with Mr. Porra declaring that their scrum-half Thomas McCue and hooker Thomas Armitt were superior to them because of their complicity.

Back in the Championship, S.A. Villeneuve faced XIII Catalan in the quarter-finals in March. The match was a favorite of M. Porra, himself a Catalan like J. Daffis and J. Galia, but despite their inferiority at the scrum, XIII Catalan triumphed over the Villeneuvois 21-13. S.A. Villeneuve now set their sights on the French Cup. Having qualified for the semi-finals against Bordeaux XIII, M. Porra supervised the young heel player Henri Durand, a great rugby hope from Béziers, and thanks to their superiority in the scrum, they won 28-8 to qualify for the final. For this final, the Côte Basque XIII was their opponent. At the Parc de Suzon in Bordeaux, the Côte Basque surprised S.A. Villeneuve and won 15-8. Max Rousié and Étienne Cougnenc were found not to have the guarantees to hold their places due to their early returns from injury. Despite M. Porra's determination, the Villeneuvois came up against the Basques' defense, where Henri Sanz and Sylvain Claverie-Barbe stood out. He ended his season with a prestigious 8-5 victory over the Dominions with the French national team at the Buffalo stadium in front of over 10,000 spectators, a match which was not considered an official international match.

=== 1936: Leading player with XIII Catalan ===
==== 1936-1937: two lost finals ====
In September 1936, Maurice Porra expressed his desire to return to his native département to play for the Perpignan-based XIII Catalan, the reigning French champions. As soon as he joined the club, he became a first-team regular for the Catalans. Following the absence of departures of the players who had won the 1936 title and the arrival of M. Porra, the club established itself as the favorite to win the French Championship, and confirmed this status with victory over Max Rousié's R.C. Roanne in November 1936. At the start of the season, Porra maintained his position as France's best hooker by playing in the November match between the French national team and “le Reste”.

For the 1936-1937 European Cup, France faced Wales on December 6, 1936. Coach J. Galia maintained his confidence in his Catalan hooker, but the XIII de France were beaten 9-3. In the Championship, XIII Catalan coach Roger Ramis makes M. Porra his forwards leader. The results confirmed the Catalans' excellent season, with a string of victories and a season-long lead in the Championship.

By the time March 1937 arrived, Porra was playing in the pre-selection match for the French national team, and was considered one of the undisputed players in the squad alongside Rousié, François Noguères, Maurice Brunetaud, and Charles Petit. France were dominated by the Dominions 6-3 in a match in which Porra was cited as one of the best players. He was then naturally selected to play against England in the European Cup in Halifax on April 10, 1937. Leading 9-7 at half-time, France were reduced to twelve men when Robert Samatan went off injured, and the English won the second half 23-9 despite Porra's perfect heeling.

At club level, XIII Catalan reached the final of both the French Championship and the French Cup, and it was at this time that Mr. Porra expressed the idea of retiring from rugby à XIII at the end of the season due to personal events, with a view to getting down to serious work. In the French Cup final on May 9, 1937, Mr. Porra was reunited with his former partners from S.A. Villeneuve, who had not only lost the Catalan but also Jean Galia. Led by Maurice Brunetaud, the Villeneuvois overcame the Catalans to win 12-6. A week later, in the final of the French Championship played on May 16, 1937, XIII Catalan, winners of the regular season, faced second-placed Bordeaux XIII. After a balanced first half, with the score level at 8-8, the Perpignanais succumbed to the attacking onslaughts of the Bordeaux team, reduced to twelve men due to the injury to Albert Falwasser, in the last twenty minutes, conceding three tries for a final score of 23-10. M. Porra was cited as one of his team's best, but was unable to counter the Bordeaux scrum.

==== 1937-1939: continuing with XIII Catalan ====
Despite his intention to end his sporting career, Maurice Porra decided to continue with XIII Catalan for the 1937-1938 season, as confirmed by club president Marcel Laborde in September 1937. The XIII Catalan positioned itself as a team to be reckoned with in the French Championship, despite a sluggish start to the season due to the absences of François Noguères, Aimé Bardes, and Serre Martin. The first line of forwards, meanwhile, is dominated by heel strikers M. Porra, Gilbert Ponramon, and Forma.

For their first international match, a friendly against the British Empire, M. Porra was one of the omissions from the list drawn up by coach J. Galia. Galia, seeing his former Villeneuve team-mate Henri Durand preferred to him at hooker. In December 1937, M. Porra suffered a muscle tear which kept him off the field for several days, and at the same time he was omitted from the shortlist drawn up by J. Galia, who was trying to rejuvenate the French squad for a double-header against Australia in January 1938, where the heel players H. Durand, Lassalle from Palaiseau and Pierre Etchart from the Basque country had been called up. However, he was called up to a regional squad named “du Midi” to play a friendly against Australia in Toulouse on January 23, 1938, a match the southerners won 15-0. The arrival of H. Durand as heeler prevented him from playing for the French team again, since in March 1938, he was once again the heeler selected by J. Galia. In national competitions, XIII Catalan with M. Porra enjoyed a season in which they reached the final stages, but failed to qualify for a final, each time being beaten by R.C. Roanne, a club now boasting top players such as Max Rousié, Jean Dauger, Robert Samatan, and Léopold Servole. Thus, on April 17, 1938, XIII Catalan were eliminated in the quarter-finals of the Championship, 20-5, but not without demerit, then in the semi-finals of the Coupe de France in Narbonne, where R.C. Roanne proved superior, winning 17-10 to reach their first Coupe de France final in their history, a match contested before representatives of R.C. Narbonne, F.C. Lézignan, and A.S. Carcassonne.

M. Porra returned for another 1938-1939 season with XIII Catalan, recruiting André Gau. Throughout the season, the club was a contender for one of the top four places in the regular phase to qualify for the semi-finals of the French Championship, but saw four clubs - R.C. Roanne, S.A. Villeneuve, A.S. Carcassonne and Bordeaux XIII - slip down the rankings, forcing the Catalan club to finish in fifth place. By contrast, XIII Catalan enjoyed an epic French Cup campaign. M. Porra and XIII Catalan successively beat C.A. Brive in the round of 16, S.A. Villeneuve in the quarter-finals and Bordeaux XIII in the semi-finals, to reach the final. Mr. Porra, suspended by the French Federation for rough play during the semi-final, during which he was expelled, was not present for the final won by XIII Catalan.

=== 1939-1950: conversion to coaching and premature death ===
Maurice Porra's career came to an end in the 1939-1940 season with the outbreak of the Second World War, which led to the suspension of the championship and the call-up of many players for military service in September 1939. For many, this put an end to their sporting careers, before rugby à XIII was banned in France in 1940 by the Vichy regime.

During the war, when XV rugby competitions resumed, Maurice Porra asked to be reinstated to XV rugby in December 1940, but once again the French XV Rugby Federation extended his ban, which had begun in January 1931, and refused to allow him to play again. He was able to coach, however, and took charge of the Prades and then the Stade Aurillacois teams. He returned to Perpignan, where he played for a number of years. He returned to Perpignan, and when rugby à XIII was revived following its ban, he took charge of the XIII Catalan club with Augustin Saltraille from 1945 to 1947. He went on to coach XV rugby, taking charge of the Céret Sportif club from 1949 until his death.

He died on September 2, 1950, in the rue de Céret in Perpignan, struck down by a pulmonary embolism at the age of 44, leaving behind his wife and two young children. To commemorate his memory, a match under the patronage of the newspaper L'Indépendant was organized by the amicale des ex-Catalans and held on April 15, 1951 at the Jean-Laffon stadium. Many players responded positively to this invitation: Émile Bosc, Félix Bergèse, Yves Bergougnan, Joseph Choy, Jean Poch and Jean Quéroli were included in a French selection and faced a selection of ex-Catalans including Joseph Desclaux, André Bruzy, Philippe Ascola, Georges Bentouré and Joseph Ollet.

== Awards ==
=== Rugby à XV ===
==== Selection details ====
Maurice Porra's international matches
Date	Adversary	Result	Competition	Position	Points	Trials	Pen.	Drops
1^{er} janvier 1931	Irlande	3-0	Cinq Nations	Talonneur	-	-	-	-

==== Club details ====
Season		Championship		Selection				
Season		Competition	Classification	Competition	M	Pts	Trials	Drops
1927-28	FC Lézignan	French Rugby Union Championship	fivesome					
1928-29	FC Lézignan	French Rugby Union Championship	Finalist					
1929-30	FC Lyon	French Rugby Union Championship	fivesome					
1930-31	FC Lyon	Tournoi des douze	11th	Five Nations Championship	1	-	-	-
1931-31	SU Agen	Suspended and deregistered by the French Rugby Federation						
1931-32	SU Agen	Suspended and deregistered by the French Rugby Federation						
1932-33	SU Agen	Suspended and deregistered by the French Rugby Federation						
1933-34	No club	Suspended and deregistered by the French Rugby Federation						

=== XIII Rugby ===
==== As a player ====
Collective :

- French Championship winner: 1935 (Villeneuve).
- French Cup winner: 1939121 (XIII Catalan).
- French Championship finalist: 1937 (XIII Catalan).
- French Cup finalist: 1936 (Villeneuve) and 1937 (XIII Catalan).

==== European Nations Cup ====
Details of Porra's European Nations Cup career.
Edition	Rank	France results	Porra results	Porra matches
1935	2	1 v 1 n 0 d	1 v 1 n 0 d	2/2
1936	3	0 v 0 n 2 d	0 v 0 n 1 d	1/2
1937	3	0 v 0 n 2 d	0 v 0 n 2 d	2/2

==== Selection details ====
Maurice Porra's international matches
Date	Adversary	Result	Competition	Position	Points	Trials	Pen.	Drops
15 April 1934	England	21-32	Test-match	Hooker	-	-	-	-
1 January 1935	Wales	18-11	European Rugby League Championship	Hooker	-	-	-	-
28 March 1935	England	15-15	European Rugby League Championship	Hooker	-	-	-	-
16 February 1936	England	7-25	European Rugby League Championship	Hooker	-	-	-	-
6 May 1936	Dominions	8-5	Friendly	Hooker	-	-	-	-
6 December 1936	Wales	3-9	European Rugby League Championship	Hooker	-	-	-	-
21 March 1937	Dominions	3-6	Friendly	Hooker	-	-	-	-
10 April 1937	England	9-23	European Rugby League Championship	Hooker	-	-	-	-

==== Club details ====
Season		Championship		Cup		Selection					
Season		Competition	Classification	Competition	Classification	Competition	M	Pts.	Trials	Buts	Dp.
1934-1935	Villeneuve XIII	French Rugby Union Championship	Champion	French Rugby League Cup	1/2 final	European Rugby League Championship	3	-	-	-	-
1935-1936	Villeneuve XIII	French Rugby Union Championship	1/4 final	French Rugby League Cup	Finalist	European Rugby League Championship	1	-	-	-	-
1936-1937	XIII Catalan	French Rugby Union Championship	Finalist	French Rugby League Cup	Finalist	European Rugby League Championship	2	-	-	-	-
1937-1938	XIII Catalan	French Rugby Union Championship	1/4 final	French Rugby League Cup	1/2 final						
1938-1939	XIII Catalan	French Rugby Union Championship	5th	French Rugby League Cup	Winner						

== See also ==
- FC Lézignan XIII
- US Quillan
- Jean Galia

== Bibliography ==
- Passamar, André (1984). L'Encyclopédie de Treize Magazine (in French). Treize Magazine. OCLC 461737232.
- Bonnery, Louis (1996). Le rugby à XIII : le plus français du monde (in French). Cano & Frank. OCLC 45029080.
- Arcas, Denis (2019). Rugby à XIII : Il était une fois … Le rugby de Liberté : 1933-1941, de la naissance à l'interdiction (in French). Les Éditions du Net. ISBN 9782312065854.
