= Charles Petit =

French dual-code international rugby footballer

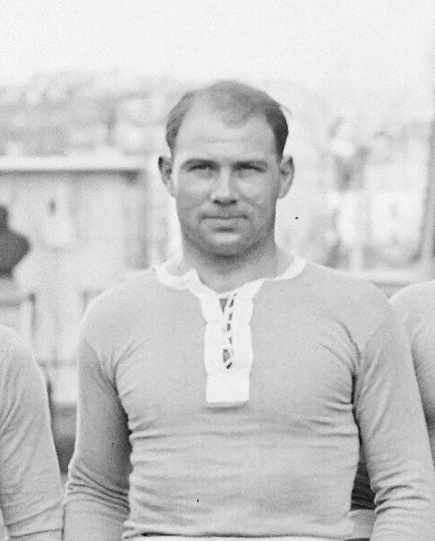

Personal information
- Full name: Charles Louis Petit
- Born: 5 January 1903 Saint-Ouen, France
- Died: 21 January 1981 (aged 78) Villeurbanne, France

Playing information

Rugby league
- Position: Second-row, Lock
Club
Years	Team	Pld	T	G	FG	P
1934–35	RC Roanne
1935–39	US Lyon-Villeurbanne
	Total	0	0	0	0	0
Representative
Years	Team	Pld	T	G	FG	P
1934–39	France	7	0	0	0	0

Rugby union
- Position: Lock
Club
Years	Team	Pld	T	G	FG	P
	SU Lorrain
Representative
Years	Team	Pld	T	G	FG	P
1931	France	1	1			3

Coaching information
Club
Years	Team	Gms	W	D	L	W%
1934–35	RC Roanne
	US Lyon-Villeurbanne
–1952	SA Lyon
1952	US Lyon-Villeurbanne
	Total	0	0	0	0

Charles Petit, born on 5 January 1903 in Saint-Ouen (Seine) and died on 21 January 1981 in Villeurbanne (Rhône), was a French international rugby union and rugby league footballer who played during the 1920s and 1930s.

While undertaking his military service in Valence-sur-Rhône, he met two rugby union players, Jean Clément from Tarbes and Raymond Causse from Béziers. Clément predicted a great future for him in the sport. After completing his military service, Petit was called upon to identify rugby talent in Lorraine. He subsequently joined SU Lorrain. He played his only season in the top division of the French Rugby Union Championship in 1931–32. In 1931, while his club was competing in the second-tier Championnat d'Honneur, he earned his first and only cap for the French national team in the 1931 Five Nations Championship. France lost 35–3 to Wales, with Petit scoring his country's only try.

With the introduction of rugby league to France by Jean Galia, Petit was among the first players to embrace the new code and took part in the Pioneers' tour in March 1934. One of the leading players in the French Rugby League Championship, he helped establish RC Roanne for the 1934–35 season as a player-coach, before spending four seasons with US Lyon-Villeurbanne in the same role. The outbreak of the Second World War and the subsequent ban on rugby league in France brought his playing career to an end. After the war, the Lyon club called upon him again to coach the team, which won the French Cup in 1953 and 1954. He subsequently became the club's sporting director.

== Personal life ==
Charles Petit was born on 5 January 1903 in Saint-Ouen. His father was Eugène Petit (1878–?) and his mother was Victorine Le Sourd (1867–1949). Charles was the eldest of five children: Victorine (1906–2005), Eugène (1906–1939), Pierre (1909–1967) and Pauline (1911–1974).

He married Marie Soulage (1897–?) on 25 June 1929 in Nancy. They divorced on 12 July 1944, and he married Paulete Charnay on 7 May 1960 in Villeurbanne. He worked as a café and bar proprietor. He died on 23 June 1981 in Villeurbanne.

== Playing and coaching career ==
=== Charles Petit at SU Lorrain and his rugby union international appearance ===
Charles Petit's only international rugby union appearance
Wales 35–3 France
France team

Jean Duhau, Robert Scohy, Marius Rodrigo, Paul Barrère, Charles Petit, Ernest Camo, Eugène Ribère, Jean Galia – Lucien Serin (scrum-half), Léopold Servole (fly-half) – Robert Samatan, Georges Clément, Max Vigerie, Lucien Augras, Maurice Savy

=== 1934: The Pioneers' tour ===
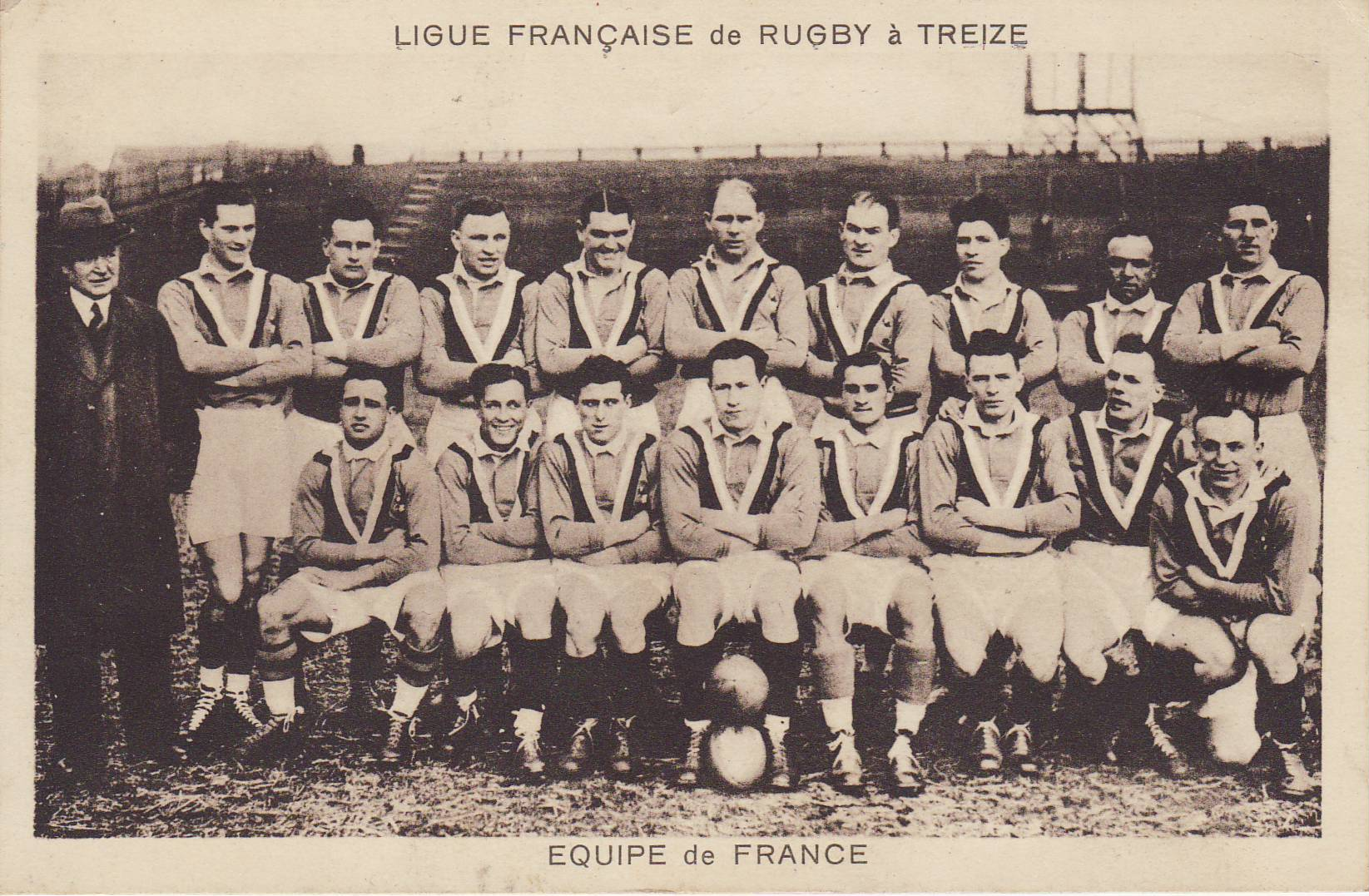
Les Pionniers or Galia's Boys , the first French rugby league team to tour England in 1934.

In late 1933, Jean Galia, who had been banned from rugby union, initiated the introduction of rugby league in France. To this end, he sought to persuade numerous players to join him. Petit, like many rugby union players, including several internationals, joined the movement.

For the first major appearance of French rugby league, Galia organised a tour of England by a French representative team in March 1934. Petit was selected for the team, which became known as Les Pionniers. He was joined by several prominent rugby union players of the time, including Joseph Carrère, Robert Samatan, Jean Duhau and Charles Mathon, who sought to challenge the practice of concealed professionalism in rugby union after being banned from the sport, while also making a living from their rugby abilities.

The tour helped establish rugby league in France, leading to the formation of numerous clubs and the introduction of the French championship in the autumn of 1934.

== Honours ==
=== Rugby union ===
==== Club and international statistics ====
Season		Championship		International appearances					
Season		Comp.	Pos.	Comp.	M	Pts	Tr	Goals	DG
1929–30	(France) SU Lorrain	Championnat d'Honneur							
1930–31	(France) SU Lorrain	Championnat d'Honneur		Five Nations	1	3	1	–	–
1931–32	(France) SU Lorrain	French Championship							
1932–33	(France) SU Lorrain	Championnat d'Honneur							
1933–34	(France) SU Lorrain	Championnat d'Honneur							

==== International appearances ====
Charles Petit's international rugby union matches
No.	Date	Opponent	Result	Competition	Position	Points	Tries	Pen.	Drops
Representing France
1	28 February 1931	Wales	3–35	Five Nations	Lock	3	1	–	–

=== Rugby league ===
==== Playing career ====
===== International appearances =====
Charles Petit's international rugby league matches
No.	Date	Opponent	Result	Competition	Position	Points	Tries	Pen.	Drops
Representing France
1	15 April 1934	England	21–32	Test match	Second-row	–	–	–	–
2	16 February 1936	England	7–25	European Championship	Loose forward	–	–	–	–
3	6 December 1936	Wales	3–9	European Championship	Loose forward	–	–	–	–
4	21 March 1937	Dominions	3–6	Test match	Loose forward	–	–	–	–
5	11 April 1937	England	9–23	European Championship	Loose forward	–	–	–	–
6	1 November 1937	(United Kingdom) British Empire	0–15	Test match	Loose forward	–	–	–	–
7	1 January 1938	Australia	6–35	Test match	Second-row	–	–	–	–

===== Club and international statistics =====
Season		Championship		Cup		International appearances					
Season		Comp.	Pos.	Comp.	Pos.	Comp.	M	Pts	Tr	Goals	DG
1934–35	(France) RC Roanne	French Championship	4th	French Cup	Quarter-finals		1	–	–	–	–
1935–36	(France) US Lyon-Villeurbanne	French Championship	Semi-finals	French Cup	Quarter-finals	EC	1	–	–	–	–
1936–37	(France) US Lyon-Villeurbanne	French Championship	5th	French Cup	Quarter-finals	EC	3	–	–	–	–
1937–38	(France) US Lyon-Villeurbanne	French Championship	Quarter-finals	French Cup	Quarter-finals		2	–	–	–	–
1938–39	(France) US Lyon-Villeurbanne	French Championship	8th	French Cup	Round of 16						

Legend: EC = European Championship.

==== Coaching career ====
- Team honours:
  - Winner of the French Cup: 1953 and 1954 (US Lyon-Villeurbanne).
  - Runner-up in the French Rugby League Championship: 1953 (US Lyon-Villeurbanne).

== Sources ==
- Bonnery, Louis (1996). Le rugby à XIII : le plus français du monde (in French). Cano & Frank. OCLC 45029080.
