= 1935 European Championship =

The 1935 European Championship can refer to European Championships held in several sports:

- 1935 European Rugby League Championship
- Eurobasket 1935
- 1935 Grand Prix season
