= George Hathway =

- Full name: George Frederick Hathway
- Born: 23 January 1897 Newport, Wales
- Died: 30 January 1971 (aged 74) Newport, Wales

Rugby union career
- Position: Hooker
International career
Years	Team	Apps	(Points)
1924	Wales	2	(0)

George Frederick Hathway (23 January 1897 – 30 January 1971) was a Welsh international rugby union player.

== Rugby career ==
A hooker, Hathway appeared for various Welsh clubs over the course of his career and also competed in French rugby with Paris Olympique. He earned his Wales caps via Newport, featuring against Ireland and France in back to back 1924 Five Nations matches. Later that year, Hathway was in the Newport side which lost a close match against the touring the All Blacks. One of his Newport teammates was his brother Reginald, who later represented Wales in rugby league. He took over as captain of Cross Keys in 1926–27.

== Personal life ==
Hathway was a coaltrimmer by profession.

== See also ==
- List of Wales national rugby union players
