= Henri Marty =

French educator

Count Henri-Marie-Joseph-René Marty
- Born: 1887
- Died: 1945 (aged 57–58)
- Occupation: Educator
- Known for: First Scoutmaster of the École des Roches in 1911

Count Henri-Marie-Joseph-René Marty (1887–1945) was a French educator, first Scoutmaster of the École des Roches in 1911, one of the first recorded Boy Scout troops in France; International Commissioner of Eclaireurs de France and the French Federal Board, as well as a member of the International Committee from 1922 to 1940. He attended William James' lectures at the University of Chicago.

At his eulogy, National Commissioner André Lefèvre said "Big and strong as a policeman in London, Count Henri Marty listened, without a word, powerful and quiet as a Roman proconsul; and his clear gaze straight ahead, as the motto, filtered through tortoiseshell-rimmed glasses: in a wink you are gauged, tried, baffled. [...] Silver Fox [his Scout name/totem] was a beautiful kind of man and a great leader.", and that the loss "will be felt by both all the Scouts of France and many French leaders and Scout Movements abroad where he enjoyed a real prestige."
