= Ernest Winter =

England international rugby league footballer

Personal information
- Full name: Ernest Winter
- Born: 4 February 1910; Pontefract district, England
- Died: fourth ¼ 1970 (aged 60); Pontefract district, England

Playing information
- Position: Centre
Club
Years	Team	Pld	T	G	FG	P
1930–33	Featherstone Rovers	92	18	0	0	54
1933–44	Hunslet	235	59	0	0	177
1939/40	→ Featherstone Rovers (guest)	1
	Total	328	77	0	0	231
Representative
Years	Team	Pld	T	G	FG	P
1932–37	Yorkshire	4	1	0	0	3
1934	Rugby League XIII	1	0	0	0	0
1933	England	1	0	0	0	0

Ernest Winter (4 February 1910 – fourth ¼ 1970) was an English professional rugby league footballer who played in the 1930s. He played at representative level for England, Rugby League XIII and Yorkshire, and at club level for Featherstone Rovers (two spells, including the second as a World War II guest), and Hunslet, as a centre.

== Background ==
Ernest Winter's birth was registered in Pontefract district, West Riding of Yorkshire, and his death aged 60 was registered in Pontefract district, West Riding of Yorkshire, England.

== Playing career ==
=== Club career ===
Ernest Winter made his début for Featherstone Rovers on Saturday 1 March 1930.

Ernest Winter played at centre, and scored a try in Hunslet's 8-2 victory over Leeds in the Championship Final during the 1937–38 season at Elland Road, Leeds on Saturday 30 April 1938.

=== International honours ===
Ernest Winter won a cap for England while at Featherstone Rovers in 1933 against Other Nationalities.

=== Representative honours ===
Ernest Winter won caps for Yorkshire while at Featherstone Rovers; during the 1932–33 season against Cumberland and Lancashire.
