= Harold Bowman =

GB & England international rugby league footballer (1903–1957)

Personal information
- Full name: Harold Bowman
- Born: 22 March 1902 unknown
- Died: 4 May 1957 (aged 55) Boothferry Park, Kingston upon Hull, England

Playing information
- Position: Prop
Club
Years	Team	Pld	T	G	FG	P
1921–39	Hull FC
Representative
Years	Team	Pld	T	G	FG	P
1927–29	England	4	0	0	0	0
1924–29	Great Britain	8	1	0	0	3

Harold Bowman (c. 1903 – 4 May 1957) was an English professional rugby league footballer who played in the 1920s and 1930s. He played at representative level for Great Britain and England, and at club level for Hull FC, as a prop, and was captain of Hull during the 1928–29 and 1929–30 seasons.

Bowman died on 4 May 1957 aged 54, he collapsed and died at Boothferry Park while watching the Rugby League semi-final.

== International honours ==
Harold Bowman won caps for England while at Hull in 1927 against Wales, in 1928 against Wales (2 matches), in 1929 against Other Nationalities, and won caps for Great Britain while at Hull in 1924 against New Zealand (2 matches), in 1926–27 against New Zealand (2 matches), in 1928 against Australia (2 matches), and New Zealand, and in 1929 against Australia.
