= John Garvey (rugby league) =

England international rugby league footballer

Personal information
- Full name: John Garvey
- Born: 18 March 1913
- Died: 1 November 1984 (aged 71)

Playing information
- Position: Centre, Stand-off
Club
Years	Team	Pld	T	G	FG	P
1930–34	St. Helens	119	52	1	0	158
1934–36	Broughton Rangers
1936–39	Wigan	84	30
	Total	203	82	1	0	158
Representative
Years	Team	Pld	T	G	FG	P
1933–36	England	2	1	0	0	3
	English League XIII
193?	Lancashire		0	0	0	0

John Garvey (18 Mar 1913 – Nov 1984) was an English professional rugby league footballer who played in the 1930s. He played at representative level for England and English League XIII, and at club level for St. Helens, Broughton Rangers and Wigan, as a centre or stand-off.

== Playing career ==
=== International honours ===
Jack Garvey won caps for England while at St. Helens in 1933 against Other Nationalities, and while at Broughton Rangers in 1936 against Wales.

=== Championship final appearances ===
Jack Garvey played stand-off in St. Helens' 9-5 victory over Huddersfield in the Championship Final during the 1931–32 season at Belle Vue, Wakefield on Saturday 7 May 1932.

=== County Cup Final appearances ===
Jack Garvey played stand-off in St. Helens' 9-10 defeat by Warrington in the 1932–33 Lancashire Cup Final during the 1932–33 season at Central Park, Wigan on Saturday 19 November 1932, and played stand-off in Wigan 10-7 victory over Salford in the 1938–39 Lancashire Cup Final during the 1938–39 season at Station Road, Swinton on Saturday 22 October 1938.
