= George Saddington =

England international rugby league footballer

Personal information
- Born: 1907 Barking, Essex, England
- Died: 1986 (aged 78–79) Hull, England

Playing information
- Position: Second-row
Club
Years	Team	Pld	T	G	FG	P
≤1934–34	Hull Kingston Rovers	171	34	12	0	126
1934–≥34	York
	Total	171	34	12	0	126
Representative
Years	Team	Pld	T	G	FG	P
1934	Rugby League XIII	1	0	0	0	0
1934	Great Britain	2	0	0	0	0

George Saddington (1907 – 1986) was an English professional rugby league footballer who played in the 1930s. He played at representative level for Great Britain and Rugby League XIII, and at club level for Hull Kingston Rovers and York, as a second-row.

== Background ==
Saddington was born in Barking, Essex in 1907.

== International honours ==
Saddington represented Rugby League XIII in 1934 against France, and won caps for Great Britain while at Hull Kingston Rovers in 1934 against Australia, and while at York in 1934 against France.
