= Druillat =

Commune in Auvergne-Rhône-Alpes, France

- Commune
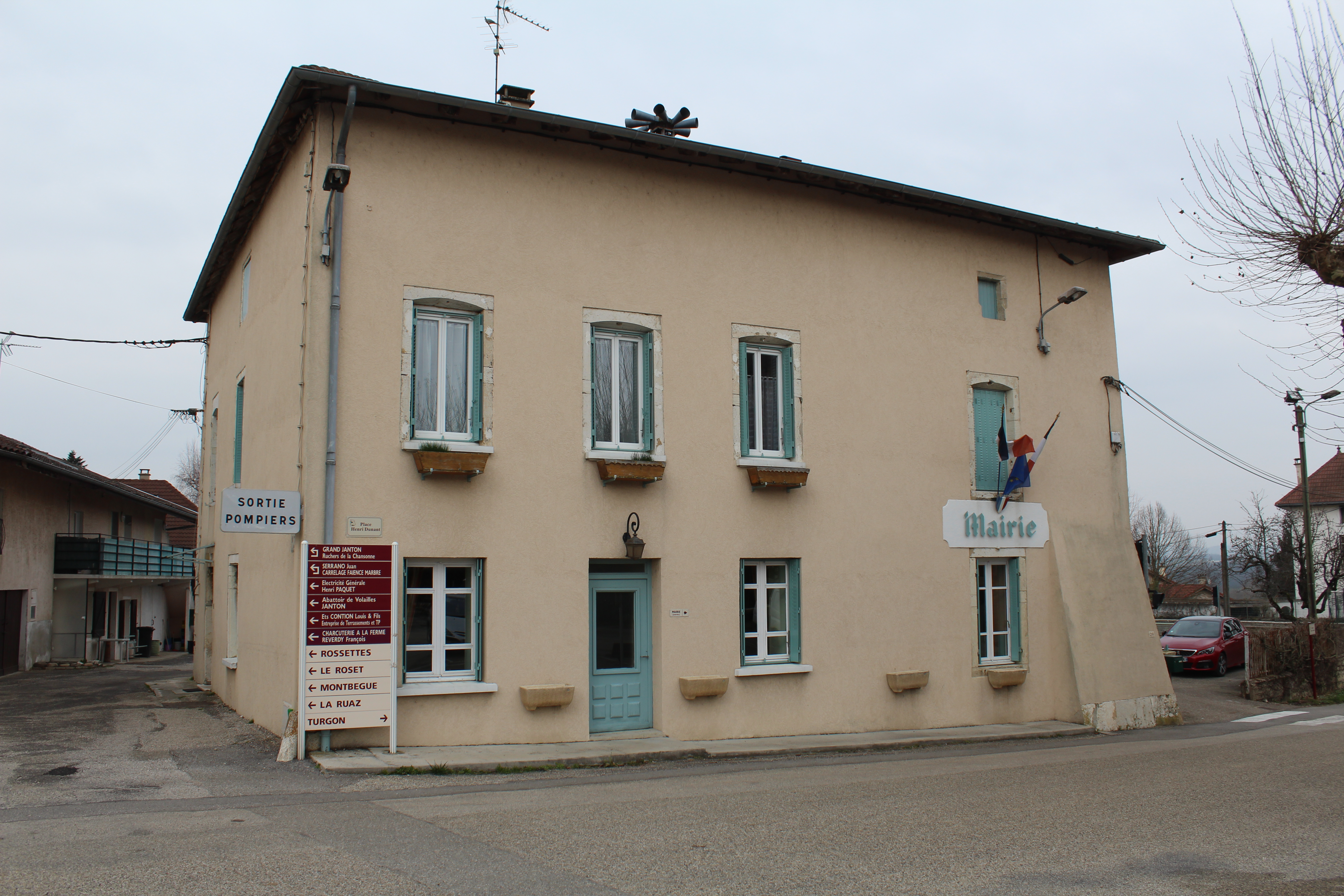
- Town hall

- Coat of arms
- Location of Druillat
- Location within France Location within Auvergne-Rhône-Alpes
- Coordinates: 46°04′00″N 5°19′00″E
- Country: France
- Region: Auvergne-Rhône-Alpes
- Department: Ain
- Arrondissement: Bourg-en-Bresse
- Canton: Ceyzériat
- Intercommunality: CA Bassin de Bourg-en-Bresse

Government
  - Mayor (2026–32): Jean-Luc Emin
- Area^{1}: 20.72 km^{2} (8.00 sq mi)
- Elevation: 270 m (890 ft)
- Highest elevation: 343 m (1,125 ft)
- Lowest elevation: 232 m (761 ft)
- Population (2023): 1,129
  - Density: 54.49/km^{2} (141.1/sq mi)
- Time zone: UTC+01:00 (CET)
  - Summer (DST): UTC+02:00 (CEST)
- INSEE/Postal code: 01151 /01160
- ^{1} French Land Register data, which excludes lakes, ponds, glaciers > 1 km^{2} (0.386 sq mi or 247 acres) and river estuaries.

Druillat (French pronunciation: [dʁɥija]) is a commune in the Ain department in eastern France.

== Population ==
Historical population
Year	Pop.	±% p.a.
1968	610	—
1975	644	+0.78%
1982	717	+1.55%
1990	823	+1.74%
1999	882	+0.77%
2007	1,123	+3.07%
2012	1,153	+0.53%
2017	1,159	+0.10%
2023	1,129	−0.44%
Source: INSEE

== Health ==
As of late 2018, the French authorities were investigating the rural area surrounding Druillat because of an unusual cluster of babies born with birth defects.

== See also ==
- Communes of the Ain department
