= Reginald Hathway =

Wales international rugby league & union footballer

Reg Hathway
Personal information
- Full name: Reginald Hathway
- Born: 1907 Newport district, Wales
- Died: unknown

Playing information

Rugby union
- Position: Forward
Club
Years	Team	Pld	T	G	FG	P
1924–28/29	Newport RFC	106	10

Rugby league
- Position: Second-row, Loose forward
Club
Years	Team	Pld	T	G	FG	P
1928/29–32	Oldham	129	25	0	0	75
1932–34	Wigan	57	3	0	0	9
	Total	186	28	0	0	84
Representative
Years	Team	Pld	T	G	FG	P
1932	Wales	2

Reginald "Reg" Hathway was a Welsh rugby union and professional rugby league footballer who played in the 1920s and 1930s. He played club level rugby union (RU) for Newport RFC, as a forward, and representative level rugby league (RL) for Wales, and at club level for Oldham and Wigan, as a second-row or loose forward.

== Background ==
Reg Hathway's birth was registered Newport district, Wales.

== Playing career ==
=== International honours ===
Reg Hathway won caps for Wales while at Oldham 1932 2-caps.

=== Championship final appearances ===
Reg Hathway played at second-row in Wigan's 15–3 victory over Salford in the Championship Final during the 1933–34 season at Wilderspool Stadium, Warrington on Saturday 28 April 1934.

=== Club career ===
Reg Hathway played in Newport RFC's 3-20 defeat by New South Wales Waratahs during the 1927–28 Waratahs tour of the British Isles, France and Canada at Rodney Parade, Newport, Wales on Thursday 22 September 1927.

== Genealogical information ==
Reg Hathway was the younger brother of the rugby union forward of the 1920s for Wales, Newport RFC, Cross Keys RFC and London Welsh RFC; George Hathway.
