= 1924–25 French Rugby Union Championship =

- Countries: France
- Champions: US Perpignan
- Runners-up: Carcassonne

The 1924–25 French Rugby Union Championship was won by the US Perpignan that defeated the Carcassonne in the final.

The Championship was contested by 30 teams divided in 6 pools of 5.

The championship of "première série", was now called "excellence", the second division become "honneur".

Seven new clubs make their debut in "Excellence" : Angoulême, Stade Bagnères, Boucau, Limoges, Mazamet (champion of second division 1924), Arlequins Perpignan and La Teste.

They replaced: Biarritz, SBUC, Chalon, Lézignan, Lourdes, Olympique du Paris and Poitiers.

== First round ==
(3 point for victory, 2 for draw, 1 for defeat, 0 in case of forfait)

In 'bold the teams qualified for next round

- Pool A
  - Toulouse 11 pts
  - Stade Français 10 pts
  - Arlequins Perpignan 9 pts
  - Hendaye 5 pts
  - Agen 5 pts
- Pool B
  - SA Bordeaux 10 pts
  - US Perpignan 9 pts
  - Toulouse Olimpyque EC 8 pts
  - Pau 7 pts
  - Périgueux 7 pts
- Pool C
  - Stadoceste 10 pts
  - Albi 9 pts
  - AS Bayonne 8 pts,
  - Toulon8 pts
  - La Teste 4 pts
- Pool D
  - Grenoble 12 pts,
  - Mazamet 8 pts,
  - Stade Bagnères 8 pts,
  - Béziers 8 pts
  - Soustons 4 pts
  - Tie-Break: Mazamet - Stade Bagnères 9 a 0
- Pool E :
  - Carcassonne 10 pts
  - Bayonne 10 pts
  - Begles 10 pts
  - Angoulême 6 pts
  - Limoges 4 pts
  - Tie-Break: Bayonne - Bègles 3 a 0
- Pool F
  - Narbonne 12 pts,
  - Racing 10 pts
  - SO Avignon 7 pts,
  - Boucau 6 pts,
  - Cognac 6 pts

== Quarter of finals ==
(3 point for victory, 2 for draw, 1 for defeat, 0 in case of forfait)

- Pool A
  - Toulouse 6 pts,
  - Bayonne 4 pts
  - Racing 2 pts
- Pool B
  - Stadoceste 5 pts
  - US Perpignan 5 pts
  - Stade Français 2 pts
  - Tie-Break : US Perpignan – Stadoceste 5 - 3
- Pool C
  - Narbonne 6 pts
  - Albi 4 pts
  - Grenoble 2 pts
- Pool D
  - Carcassonne 6 pts
  - Mazamet 3 pts
  - SA Bordeaux 3 pts

== Semifinals ==
5 apr. 1925	Carcassonne	-	Toulouse	3 - 0	Bordeaux

5 apr. 1925	Perpignan	-	Narbonne	3 - 3	Toulouse
19 apr. 192	Perpignan	-	Narbonne	13 - 5	Béziers

== Final ==
The US Perpignan beat AS Carcassonnaise 5 - 0 (after un first match tied 0-0, on 26 April 1925 at Toulouse, Stade des Ponts-Jumeaux).

Teams	US Perpignan - Carcassonne
Score	5-0 (5-0)
Date	3 May 1925
Venue	Parc Maraussan, Narbonne
Referee	Robert Vigné
Line-up
US Perpignan	Etienne Cayrol, Marcel Darné, Roger Ramis, Marcel Baillette, René Tabès, Joseph Pascot, Jean Carbonne, Eugène Ribère, Ernest Camo, Noël Sicart, André Rière, Marcel Henric, Camille Montadé, Georges Delort, Joseph Sayrou
Carcassonne	François Andrieu, Henri Gleyzes, Jean Roux, Albert Miquel, Albert Domec, Philippe Marty, Jean Darsans, Jean Sébédio, Joseph Raynaud, Henri Séguier, Achille Cadenat, Germain Raynaud, Jean Casterot, Roger Mauran, Etienne Aguado
Scorers
US Perpignan	1 try and 1 conversion de Ramis
Carcassonne

== Other competitions ==
The 19 April 1925, in Bordeaux, the Montferrand beat Biarritz in the final of the "Championnat de France Honneur" (2° division) for 14 - 6

In Third division Cercle Athlétique d'Esperaza beat in the final Cheminots de Béziers 25 - 0

== Sources ==
- L'Humanité, 1925
- Compte rendu de la finale de 1925, sur lnr.fr
- Information sur first final, sur finalesrugby.com
