= 1931–32 French Rugby Union Championship =

French rugby championship

- Countries: France
- Champions: Lyon OU
- Runners-up: Narbonne

The 1931–32 French Rugby Championship was won by le Lyon OU that defeated Narbonne in the final. The Championship was contested by 40 teams divided in eight pools of five.

Per the second year, the Championship was organized without the clubs of the Union française de rugby amateur who arranged their own championship.

At the 12 dissidents of the previous year (Bayonne, Biarritz, Stade Bordelais, Carcassonne, Grenoble, Limoges, FC Lyon, Nantes, Pau, US Perpignan, Stade Français and Toulouse) joined Stadoceste Tarbais and US Narbonne, a new club.

In the championship there were seven newcomer Gujan-Mestras, SU Lorrain (Nancy), Peyrehorade, US Romans-Péage, FC Saint-Claude, La Teste and SC Toulouse.

== First round ==
Pool A

- Agen (campione 1930)
- Gujan-Mestras
- Montauban
- Peyrehorade
- Tolone

Pool B

- Cognac
- Lyon
- Périgueux
- Soustons
- SC Toulouse

Pool C

- SA Bordeaux
- Stade Nay
- Stade Pézenas
- Roanne
- US Fumel

Pool D

- Brive
- Narbonne
- FC Saint-Claude
- Toulouse OEC
- Tyrosse

Pool E

- Albi
- AS Bayonne
- Bègles
- AS Bort
- CASG Paris

Pool F

- Montferrand
- SU Lorrain
- Racing Paris
- Romans-Péage
- Vienne

Pool G:

- Auch
- Boucau
- Stade Hendayais
- Arlequins Perpignan
- Quillan

Pool H:

- Béziers
- Lourdes
- Oloron
- La Teste'
- Thuir

== Second round ==
Pool A

- Tolone
- CASG Paris
- Cognac

Pool B

- Narbonne
- Périgueux
- La Teste

Pool C

- Stade Pézenas
- Boucau
- Gujan-Mestras

Pool D

- Bègles
- Quillan
- Lourdes

Pool E

- SA Bordeaux
- Agen
- Racing Paris

Pool F

- US Fumel
- Vienne
- Auch

Gruppo G

- Montferrand
- Bort
- Saint-Claude

Gruppo H

- Lyon OU
- Béziers
- Brive

== Quarterfinals ==
10 April 1932	Montferrand	-	Fumel	8 - 3	Bordeuax
10 April 1932	Narbonne	-	Toulon	14 - 3	Lyon
10 April 1932	Lyon OU	-	SA Bordeaux	28 - 0	Stade Jean-Bouin, Paris
10 April 1932	Pezenas	-	Begles	17 - 11	Toulouse

== Semifinals ==
24 April 1932	Narbonne	-	Montferrand	5 - 0
24 April 1932	Lyon OU	-	Pezenas	6 - 0

== Final ==
Teams	Lyon OU - Narbonne
Score	9-3 (4-3)
Date	5 May 1932
Venue	Parc des sports, Bordeaux
Referee	Jacques Muntz
Line-up
LOU	Jean Rat, Fernand Cartier, Hyacinthe Dugouchet, Fleury Panel, Joseph Griffard, Noël Salset, Louis Vallin, Roger Claudel, Jean Brial, Georges Battle, Albert Janoglio, Vincent Graule, Paul Durand, Lucien Deschamps, Henri Marty
Narbonne	Tisiner, Roger Bricchi, Marius Roumagnac, René Araou, Joseph Choy, François Lombard, Ernest Frayssinet, Joseph Nunez, Honoré Laffont, Albert Cauneilles, Francis Vals, Jean Pagès, André Pignol, Alphonse Jalabert, Paul Bergé
Scorers
Lyon OU	1 try Rat; 1 drop de Battle
Narbonne	1 penalty de Bergé

== Other competitions ==
The first edition of Challenge Yves du Manoir was won by Agen, first of the pool ahead of Lyon OU second.

The Championship "Honneur revient" was won by Cercle Sportif Villefranche-sur-Saône that beat Chalon 3 - 0

In the Promotion Championship, the CS Lons beat US Coursan 10 - 3

The tournament of UFRA (Union française de rugby amateur) was won by Stade Toulousain
