= 1934–35 French Rugby League Cup =

1934–35 Coupe de France
- Duration: 4 rounds
- Winners: US Lyon-Villeurbanne
- Runners-up: XIII Catalan

The 1934–35 Coupe de France de Rugby à XIII was the inaugural edition of the Coupe de France de Rugby à XIII (lit. 'Rugby League French Cup'), the country's original and premier knockout competition for the sport of rugby league football. It coincided with the holding of the inaugural French Rugby League Championship. US Lyon-Villeurbanne won the tournament, beating Perpignan-based XIII Catalan in the final. One week after the tournament's conclusion, the winning team was presented with a championship trophy donated by Edward Stanley, 17th Earl of Derby, and the competition later became known by its name, the Coupe Lord Derby.

== Format ==
The Coupe de France was initially projected to feature all professional and some amateur clubs, with competition starting on 9 December 1934. However, as the difference in playing standard between the two classes was deemed too high at this early stage of the game's development, it was decided that this inaugural edition would only include the ten teams from the French professional championship. The competition was abridged from five rounds to four, and all games were played in the year 1935. Select amateur clubs would be included the following year, and the French Rugby League would create a second competition, initially called Coupe de France Amateur and today known as Coupe de France Albert-Falcou, specifically for amateur clubs in 1937.

A preliminary round was organized involving the four lowest ranked teams in the regular season of the French championship. Following this, a draw was held on 5 February 1935 at Hôtel Régina in Toulouse during an assembly of the French Rugby League, which determined the quarterfinal matchups. The seeding of the semifinals was predetermined, and teams were not re-seeded or re-drawn. Host cities were chosen by the league on a per-game basis. Paris was considered as a host city, early on for the final, and later for a semifinal, but all games were ultimately staged in the southern half of the country.

=== Bracket ===
Play-in round
27 Jan – Stade Saint-Jean, Anglet
8 | Paris XIII | 19
9 | Côte Basque XIII | 6
27 Jan – Stade du Vernet, Perpignan
7 | XIII Catalan
10 | SO Béziers | F

Quarterfinals
10 Mar – Stade Municipal, Villeurbanne
US Lyon-Villeurbanne | 13
Roanne XIII | 0
10 Mar – Stade Jacques-Thomas, Toulouse
SA Villeneuvois | 19
Bordeaux XIII | 7
10 Mar – Stade du Vernet, Perpignan
XIII Catalan | 18
RC Albigeois | 8
10 Mar – Parc de Suzon, Talence
Paris XIII | 7
Pau XIII | 3

Semifinals
14 Apr – Parc de Suzon, Talence
US Lyon-Villeurbanne | 14
SA Villeneuvois | 13
21 Apr – Stade Jacques-Thomas, Toulouse
XIII Catalan | 22
Paris XIII | 15

Final
5 May – Stade Jacques-Thomas, Toulouse
US Lyon-Villeurbanne | 22
XIII Catalan | 7

== Early rounds ==
The embattled S.O. Béziers, which was struggling in the championship standings, did not take the field for its preliminary round fixture in Perpignan, and the match was cancelled at the last minute, with the referee and fans already inside XIII Catalan's Stade du Vernet. According to contemporary press, Béziers purposely no-showed the game in order to aggravate the opposing side, due to a personal conflict between executives of both organizations. Béziers only received a warning, and was told the club could be expelled if this happened again.

The quarterfinal between Villeneuve and Bordeaux on marked the first league game ever played in Toulouse, the epicenter of French rugby. French league pioneer Jean Galia originally tried to book downtown Toulouse's Parc des Sports, but the price tag was too high, and he had to make do with Stade Jacques-Thomas, an undersized and off-center venue. The stadium had to be refurbished and expanded on very short notice, with work scheduled as late as the eve of the fixture. A radio broadcast was arranged, and agreements with local transportation companies were negotiated to improve access on game day. It proved a resounding success, drawing at least 12,000 patrons for a gate of more than 70,000 francs, the best in the French game's short history. However, the league was criticized for grossly overbooking the stadium, which may partly have been a product of unauthorized admissions, as some sources quoted attendance as high as 15,000 when including those. The small press box also could not hold all attending journalists. In the second half, the crowd started spilling over from the cramped stands onto the field, leading to a strip of about 10 × 100 metre being unusable by the players. The quality of the pitch was also criticized, and more work was done on it to bring it to an acceptable level in time for the upcoming semifinal between Paris and XIII Catalan. Therefore, the event got mixed reviews despite public interest, with some questioning whether future games would draw as well. The Toulouse semifinal was indeed not as successful, which was blamed on the first game's mess, as well as a more competitive Easter date.

The quarterfinal between Lyon and Roanne was also controversial. The planned referee defaulted on his assignment, and his hasty replacement by the name of Rousset failed to assert control over the game. When he chose to award a contentious try to Lyon-Villeurbanne's Robert Samatan at the end of the first period, the Roanne players refused to return to the pitch for the second, and forfeited the game in protest. An angry mob of paying patrons attempted to storm the visiting team's locker room. The situation was defused when they were promised free admission to a future championship game against Pau two weeks later.

The semifinals saw the competition's most anticipated clash, between the pre-season's two most hyped teams, Lyon-Villeurbanne and Villeneuve-sur-Lot. Villeneuve, which had dominated the regular season, had by then established itself as the favorite. The loss therefore came as a bitter disappointment for the club, which indicated that it would have to consider reinforcements for the season's final stretch. Jean Galia, who had planned to retire after that season, announced that he would continue playing to get his hands on the cup.

== Final ==
In the final, again played in Toulouse and hampered by torrential rain, XIII Catalan managed to keep the score even by the end of the first half. However, they collapsed in the second against heavy favorites Lyon-Villeurbanne, who took the tournament's inaugural edition by a wide margin of 22–7.

== Game against Challenge Cup winners ==
Thanks to the cooperation of the French and English leagues, both Coupe de France and Challenge Cup finals took place on the same weekend and, to support the new French tournament, it was decided that the Challenge Cup winners would travel to Paris the following weekend to face their French counterparts in a special unification game. The RFL representative, Castleford, narrowly beat Lyon-Villeurbanne by a score of 24–21. It is prior to that game, rather than directly after the Coupe de France final, that RFL representatives handed over to the French the trophy that would become the emblem of their main knockout competition, the Lord Derby Cup.
