= 1935 European Rugby League Championship =

1935 European Championship
- Number of teams: 3
- Winner: England (1st title)
- Matches played: 3
- Points scored: 94 (31.33 per match)

The 1935 European Rugby League Championship was the first edition of the Rugby League European Championship, a rugby league tournament that took place in Europe. The tournament was played from January - April 1935 and saw the three teams played in a single round-robin tournament.

At the end of the tournament, England won the title by point difference over France with Wales finishing last.

== Results ==
1 January

France	18 – 11	Wales

Stade du Parc Lescure, Bordeaux
Attendance: 15,000

28 March

France	15 – 15	England

Stade Buffalo, Paris
Attendance: 20,000

10 April

England	24 – 11	Wales

Stanley Athletic Grounds, Liverpool
Attendance: 7,100

=== Final standings ===
Team	Played	Won	Drew	Lost	For	Against	Diff	Points
England	2	1	1	0	39	26	+13	3
France	2	1	1	0	33	26	+7	3
Wales	2	0	0	2	22	42	−20	0

- England win the tournament on points difference.
