= Jean Duhau =

Former France RL coach & dual-code international rugby footballer

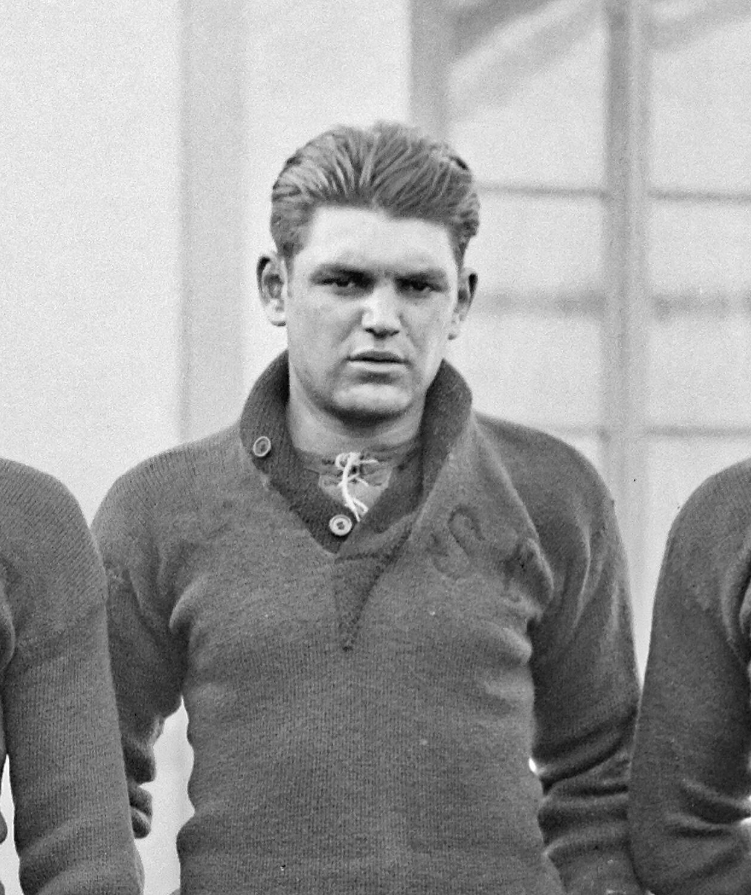
- Jean Duhau with the Stade Français jersey in 1927

Personal information
- Born: 1 May 1906 Ondres, Landes, Nouvelle-Aquitaine, France
- Died: 24 September 1973 (aged 67) Marseille, France

Playing information

Rugby union
- Position: Front row
Club
Years	Team	Pld	T	G	FG	P
	Stade Français
	SA Bordelais
	Total	0	0	0	0	0
Representative
Years	Team	Pld	T	G	FG	P
1928–30	France	7

Rugby league
- Position: Prop, Second-row
Club
Years	Team	Pld	T	G	FG	P
	RC Roanne XIII
Representative
Years	Team	Pld	T	G	FG	P
1934–37	France	6	5	5	0	25

Coaching information
Representative
Years	Team	Gms	W	D	L	W%
1951–60	France	14	5	2	7	36
- Source: As of 17 January 2021

Jean Duhau (1906–1973) is a French rugby footballer who represented France as a player in both rugby league and rugby union. He later became a coach and coached France rugby league team in multiple Rugby League World Cups.

== Playing career ==
Duhau originally played rugby union and played in the 1926–27 French Rugby Union Championship for Stade Français. He made his debut for France on 28 January 1928, becoming French representative 235. He later switched to rugby league, being part of the France side that toured Great Britain in 1934.

== Coaching career ==
Duhau later became a coach and coached the France rugby league team during their 1951 tour of Australia and New Zealand and at the inaugural 1954 Rugby League World Cup. He also later coached the team at the 1957 and 1960 Rugby League World Cups.
