= Jean Galia =

France international rugby union & league player and boxer (1905–1949)

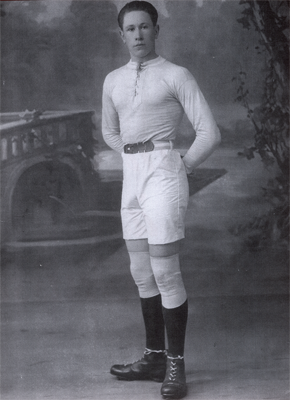

Personal information
- Born: 20 March 1905 Ille-sur-Têt, Pyrénées-Orientales, France
- Died: 17 January 1949 (aged 43) Toulouse, France

Playing information

Rugby union
- Position: Lock, No. 8
Club
Years	Team	Pld	T	G	FG	P
19??–??	US Quillan
Representative
Years	Team	Pld	T	G	FG	P
1927–31	France	20	?	?	?	9

Rugby league
- Position: Second-row
Club
Years	Team	Pld	T	G	FG	P
1934–39	Villeneuve
Representative
Years	Team	Pld	T	G	FG	P
1934–36	France	7	3	0	0	9

Coaching information
Club
Years	Team	Gms	W	D	L	W%
192?–34	Toulouse XIII
1934–36	Villeneuve
	Total	0	0	0	0
Representative
Years	Team	Gms	W	D	L	W%
1937–49	France

Jean Galia (born 20 March 1905 in Ille-sur-Têt, Pyrénées-Orientales, died 17 January 1949 in Toulouse) was a French rugby union and rugby league footballer and champion boxer. He is credited with establishing the sport of rugby league in France in 1934, where it is known as rugby à treize ("rugby 13s").

Playing in the forwards, Galia made his international debut for the France national rugby union team in a 1927 test against England in Paris. After 20 internationals, He later played in France's first ever rugby league international, also against England in Paris, on 15 April 1934 and was captain of the France national rugby league team in its early days. Following France's tour of Northern England, Galia arranged a series of demonstration matches around France.

The Courtney Goodwill Trophy, international rugby league's first, was presented for the first time in 1936 and depicted Galia, along with other pioneering greats of the code, James Lomas (Britain), Albert Baskiville (New Zealand) and Dally Messenger (Australia).

In 2026, Galia was named as one of the inaugural inductees into the IRL Hall of Legends
