= Léopold Fabre =

France international rugby union & league footballer (1907-1987)

Leopold Fabre
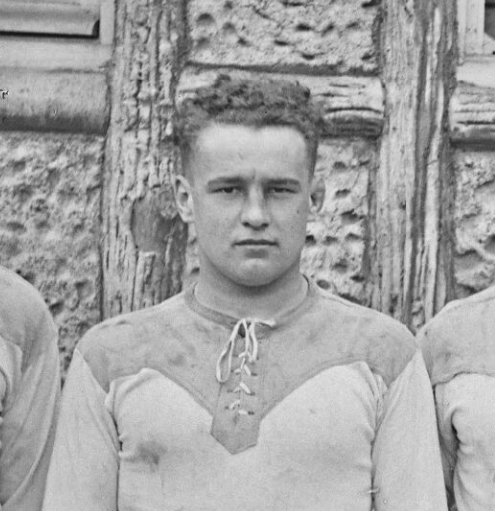

Personal information
- Full name: Léopold Fabre
- Born: 6 February 1907 Toulouse, France
- Died: 18 February 1987 (aged 80) Thézan-lès-Béziers, France

Playing information
- Height: 1.74 m (5 ft 9 in)

Rugby union
- Position: Prop, Hooker
Club
Years	Team	Pld	T	G	FG	P
1925–31	FC Lézignan
1931	Stade Châteaurenardais
1934–36	FC Lézignan (friendlies only)
	Total	0	0	0	0	0
Representative
Years	Team	Pld	T	G	FG	P
1930	France	1	-	-	-	-

Rugby league
- Position: Prop, Hooker
Representative
Years	Team	Pld	T	G	FG	P
1934	Les Pionniers	1	-	-	-	-

Léopold Fabre, born on 6 February 1907 and died on 18 February 1987, was a French international rugby union and rugby league player who played as a prop or hooker during the 1920s and 1930s.

Fabre began playing rugby union at FC Lézignan, making his debut in the French Rugby Union Championship during the 1925–26 season. The arrival of player-coach Jean Sébédio helped the club establish itself among the leading teams in the championship. Alongside teammates Maurice Porra and Gaston Amila, he reached the final of the 1929 championship, which Lézignan lost to US Quillan. He remained loyal to the club despite threats of exclusion over incidents of violent play. The club was eventually allowed to remain in the championship and continued to be regarded as an outsider. In April 1930, Fabre earned his first and only cap for the French national team in a 31–0 victory over Germany in Berlin. In April 1931, FC Lézignan was excluded from the championship for violent play, prompting Fabre to join Stade Châteaurenardais. He had also played a few matches for Stade Toulousain in 1930, during the period of the Union française de rugby amateur.

In 1934, Fabre took part in the introduction of rugby league to France, joining the Pioneers tour at the invitation of his former international teammate Jean Galia. Upon returning to Lézignan, he campaigned for the establishment of a rugby league club, but his efforts were unsuccessful. He returned to rugby union at FC Lézignan in September 1934, initially being allowed to train but not to play in competitive matches because of his involvement in rugby league. He trained alongside his two brothers, the youngest of whom, Émile Fabre, later became a French rugby union international and captain of Stade Toulousain. Fabre was restricted to friendly matches before retiring from the sport in 1936.

== Biography ==
=== Early life and beginnings in rugby union at Lézignan ===
Léopold Fabre was born on 6 February 1907 in Toulouse. His birth was not initially acknowledged by either parent. His mother, Marie Basilisse Eustelle Cuguillère (born on 28 February 1878 in Gardie), who had no occupation, formally acknowledged him as her son on 6 March 1908. His father, Léopold Fabre (born on 10 July 1861 in Lézignan-Corbières), a man of independent means, acknowledged him on 29 November 1911. On 10 December 1937, Fabre married Geneviève Suzanne Cazals at the town hall in Béziers. Growing up in south-western France, Fabre became familiar with rugby union from an early age. He attended secondary school in Foix before moving to Lézignan-Corbières, where he joined FC Lézignan.

=== 1925–1931: Career at FC Lézignan ===
==== Early career at an ambitious club ====
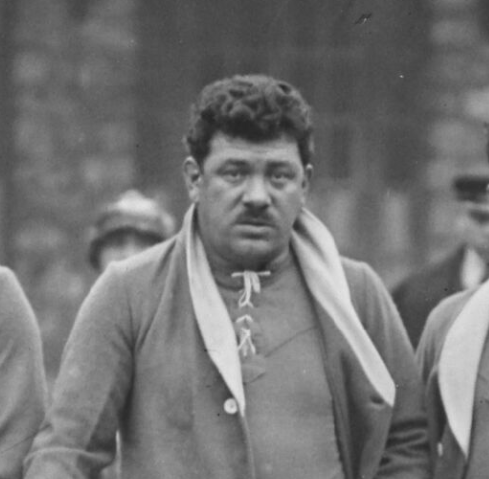
Jean Sébédio, Fabre's coach at FC Lézignan, led the club to the 1929 French Championship final.

Fabre made his debut in the French Rugby Union Championship with FC Lézignan during the 1925–26 season. The club competed in the poule d'excellence, the top division of French rugby union. Lézignan was coached by former international Jean Sébédio, nicknamed "the Sultan", a colourful character who had previously served as player-coach of AS Carcassonne. Following incidents on the pitch, the club was banned from playing home matches at the Stade du Moulin, although it remained eligible to compete in the championship. Fabre gradually established himself among the forwards and attracted the attention of the press for his ability. The club's results also led to Lézignan being regarded as an outsider for the championship title, under the leadership of captain Sébédio, who continued playing despite his age. During the 1926–27 season, FC Lézignan came close to reaching the semi-finals of the French Championship. They competed with Stade Français, whose team included Adolphe Jauréguy, Jean Duhau and André Verger, for a place in the last four. Lézignan even defeated Stade Français on 20 March 1927 at the Stade Buffalo, but the two clubs finished level on points in the group stage, requiring a deciding play-off match. Played in Colombes, the decisive match ended in an 11–5 victory for Stade Français over Fabre's FC Lézignan.

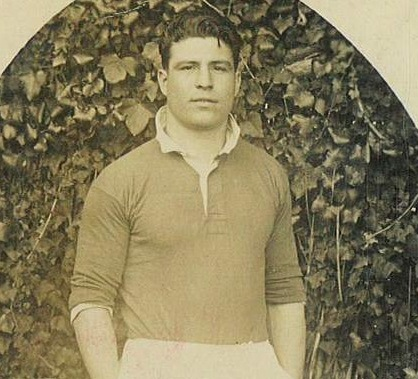
Maurice Porra played as a hooker for FC Lézignan, alongside Léopold Fabre at prop.

The 1927–28 season saw the arrival of Maurice Porra as hooker in Lézignan's front row. In the 1927–28 French Rugby Union Championship, the club was placed in Pool G alongside Racing CF, Stade Bordelais, US Montauban and CA Brive. Lézignan performed well but failed to qualify for the next stage, consisting of four-team pools, after losing 9–0 to Stade Bordelais in a qualifying play-off.

==== 1928–29: Fabre reaches the French Championship final ====
The 1928–29 season proved more promising. Jean Sébédio had retired as a player but remained coach of the Aude-based team. Lézignan surprised its opponents with a series of victories, brought to an end first by US Quillan, the previous season's French Championship runners-up, and then by AS Béziers in November 1928. As the season progressed, FC Lézignan emerged as a serious outsider for the French Championship. The club defeated several other contenders, including SC Mazamet, Stadoceste Tarbais, US Perpignan, Racing CF and SU Agen. The club had limited resources and a small squad. It also acquired an unfavourable reputation among defeated opponents, who complained about the partisanship of its supporters, the rough play of its players and the perceived bias of referees during home matches at the Stade du Moulin. By contrast, the team received praise from many opponents when playing away from home, particularly for its open, mobile style of rugby and its strength in the scrum. FC Lézignan finished top of its five-team pool and then its three-team pool, ahead of FC Grenoble and Boucau Stade, to qualify for the championship quarter-finals.

Runner-up in the 1929 French Rugby Union Championship with FC Lézignan
US Quillan 11–8 FC Lézignan
FC Lézignan team:

Léopold Fabre, Maurice Porra, Léon Duezo, André Clady, Louis Haener, Arthur Boyer (c), Antoine Wisser, Célestin Wisser - Roger Llary (m), Louis Bès (o) - Pierre Cance, Robert Gachein, Marius Dedieu, Michel Bigorre, André Calmet - Entraîneur : Jean Sébédio

In the quarter-finals, FC Lézignan faced Stade Bordelais at the Stade des Ponts-Jumeaux in Toulouse. By this stage, the team's thorough preparation for the closing stages of the season had established it as a serious contender for the title. Lézignan won the match 27–5. The Aude club then faced AS Béziers in the semi-finals at Carcassonne, while the other semi-final brought together US Quillan and SU Agen. Three of the four semi-finalists therefore came from the Languedoc regional committee. Played at the Pépinière ground before nearly 15,000 spectators, the match was closely contested. The score was 6–6 at the end of normal time, and Lézignan eventually secured a 9–6 victory after extra time, thanks to a late try by Célestin Wisser. The result took the club into the first final in its history, against US Quillan, in an all-Aude encounter. The date of the final was disputed. Quillan wanted the match to take place on 19 May, while Lézignan sought a postponement until 26 May to allow its players more time to recover. The French Rugby Federation eventually retained the earlier date. The final, played in Toulouse against a Quillan side featuring Jean Galia and Eugène Ribère, was marred by numerous fights that repeatedly interrupted play, to the frustration of the spectators. FC Lézignan led 8–0 after 45 minutes but faded towards the end of the match, allowing Quillan to secure an 11–8 victory. A few weeks later, in mid-July 1929, the council of the French Rugby Federation voted to exclude FC Lézignan from the French Championship for one year, following incidents of violent play involving the club's players during the final. During this period of uncertainty, Maurice Porra left the club to join FC Lyon, while Fabre remained at Lézignan.

==== 1929–30: Fabre earns his first international cap ====
After several weeks of uncertainty and following a reorganisation of the Languedoc committee, FC Lézignan was once again permitted to compete in the French Championship. Following Porra's departure, Fabre moved to hooker. Lézignan remained a competitive side and faced US Quillan in a much calmer atmosphere than that which had characterised the end of the previous season. Lézignan won the encounter. In December 1929, FC Lézignan was formally readmitted to the championship, allowing it to compete in the Division d'Excellence, the top tier of French rugby union. The club progressed from its five-team pool alongside FC Lourdes and SAU Limoges, but failed to qualify for the quarter-finals from the subsequent three-team pool, finishing behind Section Paloise. Towards the end of the season, Fabre appeared in several friendly matches, including one for Stade Toulousain against SO Béziers.

Léopold Fabre's only international appearance against Germany
Germany 0–31 France
France team line-up:

Joseph Choy, Léopold Fabre, Albert Ambert, André Camel, Richard Majérus, Jean Duhau, Alex Bioussa, Jean Galia - Lucien Serin (m), Henri Haget (o) - Robert Samatan, Marcel Baillette, Georges Gérald, Fernand Taillantou, Maixent Piquemal

Fabre's move to hooker proved successful. He was subsequently called up to the French national team. On 30 March 1930, he took part in a match in Toulouse organised to raise funds for victims of disasters in southern France, where he secured his place in the squad to face Germany. The international was scheduled for 6 April 1930 in Berlin. Fabre replaced his Lézignan teammate Charles Bigot at hooker, although Bigot usually played as a prop for the club. Fabre was the only Lézignan player selected for the match. Before the match, Fabre declared: "I'll do my best, believe me, to earn my cap! I've got plenty of determination and I'm not afraid of hard work." The French team assembled in Paris before travelling by sleeping car to Cologne and then continuing to Berlin. France dominated the match and defeated Germany 31–0.

==== 1930–31: FC Lézignan expelled from the championship ====
FC Lézignan and Fabre enjoyed a satisfactory 1930–31 season. The club progressed from its five-team pool, finishing ahead of Stade Hendayais and US Montauban, and advanced to the three-team pool stage alongside US Cognac and CA Périgueux. Fabre enjoyed one of his most successful seasons at hooker, establishing himself as one of the leading players in his position in the French Championship. His performances prompted the sporting press to question the French selectors over his continued absence from the national team. In March 1931, Lézignan was eliminated from the three-team pool stage by AS Montferrand. The season was marked by several controversies surrounding the rough play of Lézignan's players during matches. The club was eventually expelled by the French Rugby Federation, forcing its players to find other clubs for the 1931–32 season. Fabre decided to join Stade Châteaurenardais, alongside his brother Albert. The club failed to qualify for the Division d'Excellence.

=== 1934: The end of his rugby union career and his role as a pioneer of rugby league in France ===
==== Jean Galia persuades Fabre to join the Pioneers' tour to promote rugby league ====
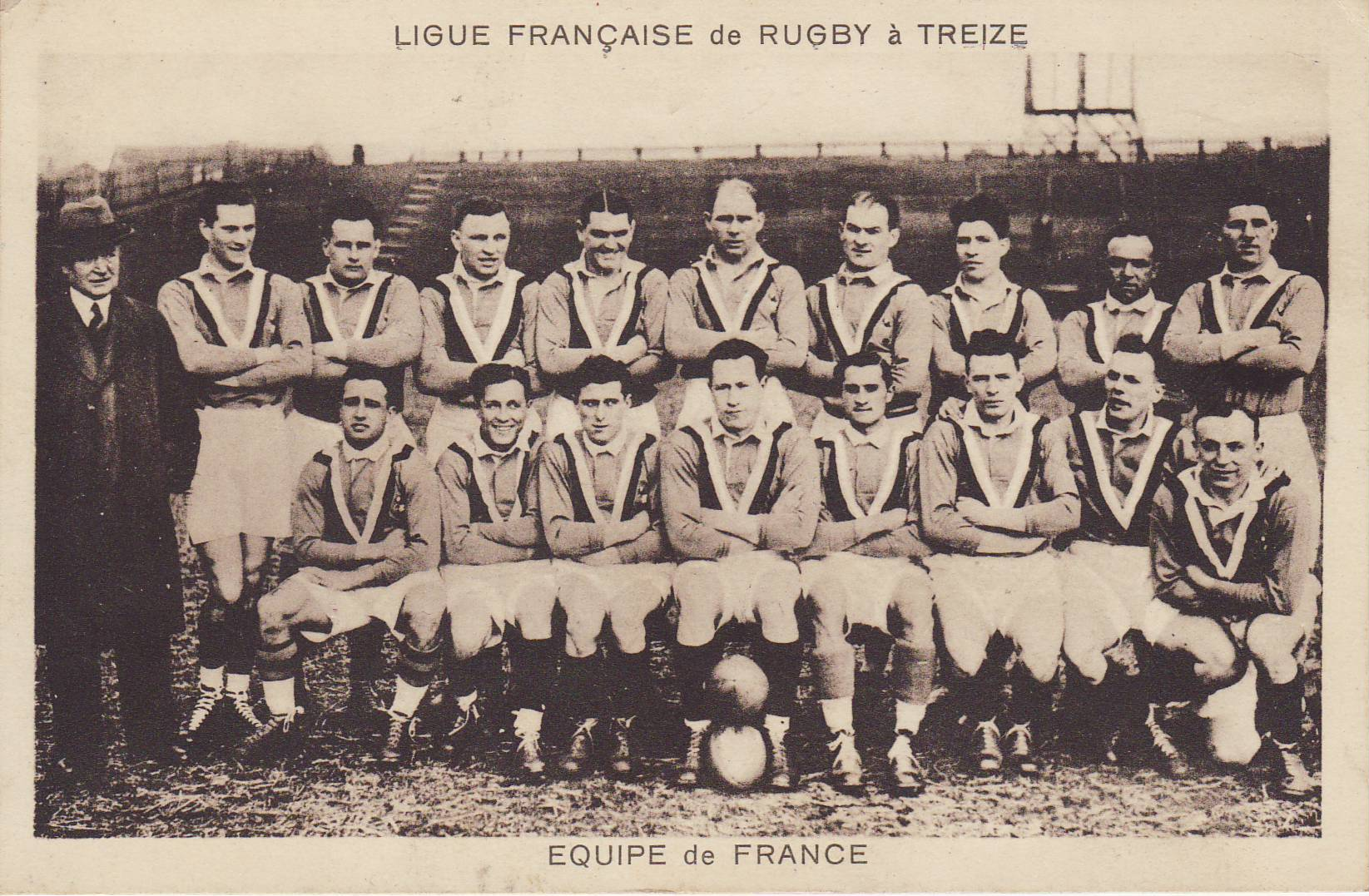
Les Pionniers, the first organised French rugby league initiative.

When rugby league was introduced in France, Jean Galia, who had been banned from rugby union, sought to persuade several players to join the new movement. Fabre announced his switch to rugby league by denouncing the practice of shamateurism in rugby union, as did many other players, including several internationals. He stated that he had received 350 francs per match while playing for Stade Toulousain during the period of the Union française de rugby amateur. He criticised the organisation for claiming to uphold the principles of pure amateurism while seeking to reform French rugby union. These revelations caused considerable controversy in rugby union, particularly in view of the British insistence on strict amateurism. To promote rugby league in France, Galia organised a tour of England by a French representative side in March 1934. Fabre joined this team, known as Les Pionniers (the Pioneers), alongside several prominent former rugby union players, including Robert Samatan, Jean Duhau, Charles Mathon and Charles Petit. Some had been banned from rugby union and sought to denounce shamateurism while continuing their rugby careers. The tour helped establish rugby league in France, leading to the creation of numerous clubs and the introduction of the French Rugby League Championship in the autumn of 1934.

==== Failed attempt to establish a rugby league club in Lézignan and the end of his playing career ====
Fabre supported efforts by former FC Lézignan presidents Guiraud, Dufour and Sermentin, together with players Gaston Amila and Maurice Porra, to establish a rugby league club in Lézignan-Corbières. However, the project was unsuccessful. In September 1934, Fabre accompanied his two younger brothers to training sessions at FC Lézignan. One of them, Émile Fabre, was a promising player who later became a French rugby union international and captain of Stade Toulousain. Initially, Fabre was unable to take part in official matches because his involvement in rugby league had led to his suspension by the French Rugby Federation. He subsequently played friendly matches for FC Lézignan, returning to rugby union before ending his playing career in 1936.

=== Later life ===
In 1939, during the Second World War, Fabre was requisitioned to work near an air base. He died on 18 February 1987 in Thézan-lès-Béziers, Hérault.

== Honours ==
=== Rugby union ===
- Team honours:
  - French Rugby Union Championship runner-up: 1929 (Lézignan).

==== International appearances ====
Léopold Fabre's international appearances
No.	Date	Opponent	Result	Competition	Position	Points	Tries	Penalties	Drop goals
1	6 April 1930	Germany	31–0	Test match	Hooker	-	-	-	-

==== Club and international statistics ====
Season	Club	Championship		International appearances					
Season	Club	Competition	Stage reached	Competition	Apps	Points	Tries	Goals	Drop goals
1925–26	(France) FC Lézignan	French Championship	Three-team pool						
1926–27	(France) FC Lézignan	French Championship	Four-team pool						
1927–28	(France) FC Lézignan	French Championship	Five-team pool						
1928–29	(France) FC Lézignan	French Championship	Runner-up						
1929–30	(France) FC Lézignan	French Championship	Three-team pool	Test match	1	0	0	0	0
1930–31	(France) FC Lézignan	French Championship	Three-team pool						
1931–32	(France) Stade Châteaurenardais								
1934	(France) Les Pionniers (rugby league)	Fabre switched to rugby league and took part in the Pioneers' tour led by Jean Galia.							
1934–36	(France) FC Lézignan	Having been expelled by the French Rugby Federation, Fabre was restricted to playing friendly matches for FC Lézignan.							

== See also ==
- List of France national Rugby league team players

== Bibliography ==
- Passamar, André (1984). L'Encyclopédie de Treize Magazine (in French). Treize Magazine. OCLC 461737232.
- Bonnery, Louis (1996). Le rugby à XIII : le plus français du monde (in French). Cano & Frank. OCLC 45029080.
- Arcas, Denis (2019). Rugby à XIII : Il était une fois … Le rugby de Liberté : 1933-1941, de la naissance à l'interdiction (in French). Les Éditions du Net. ISBN 9782312065854.
