= Claudius Devernois =

- Born: 4 December 1899
- Died: 18 July 1972 (aged 72)

Claudius Devernois, known as Claude Devernois, (4 December 1899 – 18 July 1972) was a French industrialist and sports administrator. He was born in Saint-Just-en-Chevalet, Loire, and died in Le Coteau, Loire.

He notably took part in the creation of the French Rugby League Federation in 1934, as well as in the creation of the clubs RC Roanne and US Lyon-Villeurbanne, which won numerous titles between the 1930s and the 1960s. From 1955 to 1964, he was president of the French Rugby League Federation.

== Biography ==
After obtaining his baccalauréat at Lycée Carnot in Roanne, he worked as a sales representative in the food industry and then in textiles before setting up his own textile company. He established workshops in Le Coteau, Etines, Paray-le-Monial and Gueugnon, allowing the development of his brand, Devernois. At the head of this family business, together with his son-in-law Pierre Boel, his son Jean-Bernard Devernois and his daughter Zélia Devernois, they all worked to make the brand one of the most renowned in France.

At the same time, he took part in the establishment of the new rugby code in France, namely rugby league. Present at the creation of the rugby league organisation in 1934, he quickly became one of the leading figures of the movement alongside François Cadoret, the first president of the French Rugby League Federation. Before the Second World War, he launched the RC Roanne club, regarded as one of the nine founding members of the rugby league organisation, and succeeded in convincing leading rugby union players to join his club, including Jean Dauger, Robert Samatan and Max Rousié. The club won the French Cup in 1938 and then the French Championship in 1939.

After the interruption caused by the war and the ban on rugby league, he revived the Roanne club and brought in Élie Brousse and Joseph Crespo, winning two Championship titles in 1947 and 1948. He then transferred his club to Lyon, where it became US Lyon-Villeurbanne. In 1959, he persuaded three renowned rugby union players to join rugby league and Roanne, Aldo Quaglio, Claude Mantoulan and Jean Barthe, who added to Roanne's honours with the Championship title in 1960. He also helped to create US Lyon-Villeurbanne in 1949, which became one of the dominant clubs in the French Championship during the 1950s. He also launched the career of journalist Roger Couderc, who commentated on the first televised finals of the French rugby league Championship.

In the 1950s, on 7 May 1955, he became head of the French Rugby League Federation, after having served as its vice-president in charge of financial matters, with one of his successes being the organisation of the first World Cup in 1954, in which France reached the final. He therefore succeeded Paul Barrière, who had resigned, and continued his work.

On 5 December 1964, he left the presidency of the Federation to devote himself solely to the management of his businesses and withdrew from the world of rugby league.

== Honours ==
- Knight of the Legion of Honour
- Knight of the Ordre du Mérite touristique

On 6 August 1952, Claudius Devernois was appointed a Knight of the Legion of Honour, in his capacity as vice-president of the French rugby league. He was also appointed a Knight of the Ordre du Mérite touristique on 5 December 1957, in his capacity as president of the tourist office of Roanne.
