= 1935 Silver Jubilee game =

1935 rugby match

England, Wales and Dominions (United Kingdom)	France
(RFL)	(LRXIII)
25	18
	1	2	Total
EWD	14	11	25
FRA	7	11	18
- Date: 6 May 1935
- Stadium: Headingley Stadium
- Location: Headingley, Yorkshire, England
- Referee: J.W. Webb
- Attendance: 16,000

Broadcast partners
- Broadcasters: n/a

The 1935 Silver Jubilee game was an international rugby league football game between France and a Rugby Football League selects team billed by the Press Association as England, Wales and Dominions. It was held by the RFL in honor of King George V's Silver Jubilee on 6 May 1935 at Headingley Rugby Stadium near Leeds, England.

== Background ==
The game was put together on relatively short notice, with the RFL inviting France on 10 April 1935. It was a benefit hosted in cooperation with the British Sports and Games Association in aid of King George's Jubilee Trust, which ended up receiving around £1,000 from the game's proceeds. Special commemorative medals were also made for the players.

France was quickly reported to have accepted the invitation. However, there was some back and forth with the RFL, as the final of the inaugural French Cup was scheduled for 5 May in Toulouse and the tricolores hoped to present their best possible squad. Ultimately, the RFL insisted that the game be held on the very day of the jubilee, and prepared a contingency plan, in the form of a Great Britain vs. Rest of the World setup. Bringing forward or delaying the French Cup final by a week was considered, but not enacted. Ultimately, declining such an honor was out of the question for the French, and it was agreed that their national team would travel without players from either French Cup finalists, Lyon-Villeurbanne and XIII Catalan.

The game was inserted into the schedule just days after another game between a French and an RFL selects teams (both substantially different from their jubilee incarnations), played on 28 April at Stade Buffalo near Paris. Early into that game, French star Max Rousié (Villeneuve), who was the face of the upstart nation to the British press, injured his knee. The French team's roster for the jubilee game was published after the game as intended, with Bats (Pau) mentioned as the likely replacement for Rousié at fly-half.

While the forward pack was considered set, France captain and manager Jean Galia found the selection process unusually difficult at other positions. To test the replacements for Rousié and French Cup finalists Robert Samatan (Lyon-Villeurbanne), François Noguères and Aimé Barde (XIII Catalan), a scrimmage was added at Stade Buffalo between France and a Paris selects team. Following that session, Rousié's would-be substitute at fly-half, Bats, was displaced by his Paris selects counterpart Minvielle. Rousié was brought back onto the roster, but on the threequarter line, with Cougnenc kept as an alternate in case he could not play. Another Paris player, Germineau, was added to the traveling party as an alternate scrum-half due to his strong play.

The team then rested in La Celle-Saint-Cloud, before leaving for London by plane on Saturday, the first time many of its members had used such a mean of transport. They were guests at Wembley Stadium for the Challenge Cup final, before traveling up to Leeds. Rousié decided to accompany the team and hold his decision until the last possible moment, ultimately opting against participating after training at Headingley.

The RFL announced its lineup on 1 May. Its team also did not feature any personnel from the Challenge Cup's two finalists, Castleford and Huddersfield, nor did it boast any member of either playoff finalist, Swinton and Warrington. It did travel with two alternates, Cyril Morrell and Harry Beverley, both of Hunslet. A contemporary article described the starting roster's makeup as: eight Englishmen, three Australians, one Welshman and one New Zealander.

== Game summary ==
France played in its usual jersey, while the EWD team played in all-white uniforms. France started the game poorly, with The Guardian positing that their disorganization stemmed from Rousié's absence. Carrère injured himself on a tackle after just 15 minutes, forcing Brané to assume his position, and the French team to play shorthanded for the rest of the period. By the half hour, the RFL was leading 14–0, thanks to two tries and a goal by Harris, and another try by Todd. It was Villafranca's energy that brought the French alive. Following an unsuccessful attack, he kickstarted another, this time punctuated by a Galia try, which was converted. Another effort by Villafranca just half a minute later led to a penalty, which Cougnenc kicked between the posts.

For unknown reasons, half time was whistled about three minutes early on a score of 14–7, which robbed the French side of some its momentum. However, they were also allowed to get Germineau in as a substitute for the injured Carrère. At the time, this was a sporting gesture rather than a rule provision, which the crowd applauded and the French press praised. Villafranca continued his strong work in the second stanza, running the ball twice over the course of a great passing sequence that ended with a Brané try. France Captain Galia then had to miss several minutes after being cut near the eye. Just as he was coming back onto the field, the Britons pierced the French defence for a try by Todd, which was converted. The action heated up, with both teams exchanging tries by Caussarieu, Todd and Rousse, the latter being converted for the French. With five minutes to go, Silcock intercepted a pass from Caussarieu and scored a corner try to seal the home team's victory.

The Guardian praised the French's offensive flair and thought that their unfamiliarity with the RFL players' habits was the deciding factor, as the home side had only given a passable effort, with the exception of standouts Gee, Dalton and Todd. Another prominent news outlet, The Daily Telegraph, broadly disagreed, finding the RFL representatives' performance dominant and "excellent in all respects". While commending their solid tackling and the creativity displayed by their threequarters, the paper felt that the visitors had been undone by their limited passing abilities.

== Match details ==
6 May 1935

(United Kingdom) England, Wales and Dominions	25–18	France
Try: Harris (2), Todd (4) Silcock; Goals: Harris (2)		Try: Galia, Brané, Caussarieu, Rousse; Goals: Rousse, Germineau; Penalty: Cougnenc

Headingley Stadium, Headingley
Attendance: 16,000
Referee: J.W. Webb

=== England, Wales and Dominions ===
Fullback: (England) Jim Brough (Leeds)
Threequarters: (England) Fred Harris (Leeds), (Australia) Jeff Moores (York), (New Zealand) Gordon Innes (Wigan), (England) Stanley Smith (Leeds)
Halfbacks: (England) George Todd (Hunslet) (fly-half), (Australia) Hector Gee (Wigan) (scrum-half)
Forwards: (England) Patrick Dalton (Salford) (lock), (Scotland) Alec Troup (Barrow), (Australia) Jack Dawson (Hull) (second row), (England) Nat Silcock (Widnes) (c), John Hall (Batley), (England) Harry Woods (Liverpool) (front row)

=== France ===
Fullback: Marius Guiral (Villeneuve)
Threequarters: Marcel Villafranca (Bordeaux), Georges Caussarieu (Paris), Etienne Cougnenc (Villeneuve), A. Pouey (Paris)
Halfbacks: ? Minvielle (Paris) (fly-half), Joseph Carrère (Roanne) then Pierre Germineau (Paris) (scrum-half)
Forwards: Roger Claudel (Paris) (lock), Louis Brané (Paris), Jean Galia (Villeneuve) (c) (second line), André Rousse (Pau), Maurice Porra (Villeneuve), Jean Duhau (Roanne) (front row)
