= 1930–31 French Rugby Union Championship =

- Countries: France
- Champions: Toulon
- Runners-up: Lyon OU

The 1930–31 French Rugby Union Championship of first division was won by le Toulon, which defeated Lyon OU in the final.

The Championship was contested by 40 clubs divided in 8 pools.

This season was unusual because 12 teams, including some of the more prestigious, were excluded from the tournament by Championship, and found the (Union française de rugby amateur) that arrange their championship.

They were: Bayonne, Biarritz, SBUC, Carcassonne (demi-finaliste 1930), Grenoble, Limoges, FC Lyon, Stade Nantais, Pau, US Perpignan, Stade Français and Toulouse.

In January 1931 another new club join the UFRA, the US Narbonne.

Instead the Stadoceste, did not participated at any championship.

The clubs Libourne, Pamiers (pourtant qualifié l’année précédente pour la seconde phase, les pools of 3) and Saint-Girons SC, left the scene, so were 15 the team promoted in the championship:

FC Auch, Bordeaux EC, AS Bort (champion Honneur 1930), US Bressanne (Bourg-en-Bresse), Brive, Dax, Stade Illibérien (Elne), Montauban, Stade Nay, FC Oloron, Stade Pézenas, Racing Paris, Thuir, Tyrosse and Valence

== First round ==
in bold the qualified to second round

**Pool A**

- **Stade Nay**,
- Stade Pézenas
- Roanne
- **Toulon**
- **Villeneuve**

**Pool B**

- **Cognac**
- Hendaye
- **Lézignan**
- Montauban
- **Périgueux**

**Pool C**

- **Agen**
- SA Bordeaux
- US Bressanne
- **Dax**
- **Narbonne**

**Pool D**

- Bort
- **Béziers**
- **Soustons**
- Valence Sportif
- **Vienne**

**Pool E**

- Oloron
- Oyonnax
- **Quillan**
- **Racing**
- **Thuir**

**Pool F**

- **FC Auch**
- **Bègles**
- Stade Illibérien (Elne)
- **Montferrand**
- Tyrosse

Gruppo G

- **Albi**
- **Boucau**
- Brive
- CASG
- **Lyon OU**

Gruppo H

- **AS Bayonne**
- Bordeaux EC
- Lourdes
- **Arlequins Perpignan**
- **Toulouse OEC**

== Second round ==
In bold the clubs qualified to next round

**Pool A**

- FC Auch
- Arlequins Perpignan
- **Toulon**

**Pool B**

- AS Bayonne
- **Lyon OU**
- CA Villeneuve

**Pool C**

- **Agen**
- Nay
- Toulouse OEC

**Pool D**

- Périgueux
- **Racing**
- Soustons

**Pool E**

- Bègles
- Béziers
- **Boucau**

Gruppo F

- **Montferrand**
- Thuir
- Lézignan

Gruppo G

- Albi
- **Narbonne**
- Vienne

Gruppo H

- Dax
- Montauban
- **Quillan**

== Quarterfinals ==
12 April 1931	**Agen**	-	Quillan	25–0	Bordeaux
26 April 1931	**Toulon**	-	Montferrand	6–4	Lyon
26 April 1931	**Lyon OU**	-	Racing Paris	4–2	Bordeaux
26 April 1931	**Narbonne**	-	Boucuau	6–0	Toulouse

== Semifinals ==
3 May 1931	**Toulon**	-	Narbonne	9–0	Toulouse
3 May 1931	**Lyon OU**	-	Agen	11–8	Béziers

== Final ==
Teams	**Toulon** - Lyon OU
Score	**6**–3 (0–3)
Date	10 May 1931
Venue	Parc Lescure Bordeaux
Referee	Abel Martin
Line-up
Toulon	Eugène Chaud, Etienne Allègre, Amédée Couadou, Marcel Baillette, Jacques Farré, Léopold Servole, Emile Lamothe, Auguste Borréani, Jean Manciet, Eugène Delangre, Michel Vails, Paul Barrère, Joseph Lafontan, René Namur, Jules Hauc
Lyon OU	Henri Marty, Paul Durand, Vincent Graule, Jean Siré, Gabriel Dubois, Georges Battle, Jean Brial, Roger Claudel, Lucien Laffond, Louis Valin, Jean Rat, Fleury Panel, André Vincent, Fernand Cartier, Billerac
Scorers
Toulon	2 tries Borréani and Servolle
Lyon OU	1 try Panel

== Other competitions ==
L'UA Libournaise won the second division championship ("Honneur") winning against l'Union Athlétique de Gujan-Mestras, 8–5.

In the final of the French Championship Second Series (third division) Toulouse SC defeated Saint-Girons, 17–0.

In third series, le C.O. l Ceret beat the AS Bourse (Paris), 6–4.

L'AS Montferrand winning against le Toulouse Olympique Employés Club in the final, 12–6, won the first Frantz Reichel Cup (French Juniors Championship ).

The UFRA Tournament was won by Toulouse.

== Sources ==
- L'Humanité, 1930–1931
- Compte rendu de la finale de 1931, sur lnr.fr
- finalesrugby.com
- Encyclopédie du rugby - mise - jour périodique
