= 1929–30 French Rugby Union Championship =

- Countries: France
- Champions: Agen'
- Runners-up: Quillan

The 1929−30 French Rugby Union Championship of first division was won by Agen that defeated the Quillan in the final.

The Championship was contested by 40 clubs divided into 8 pools of five.

Some team were qualified for their results in regional championship: CASG (2nd in Paris), Libourne (4th en Côte d'Argent), FC Lyon (4th en Lyonnais) and CS Oyonnax (5th du Lyonnais).

Five new clubs was promoted in the "Excellence" : Hendaye, Lyon OU, Oyonnax, Roanne (champion Honneur 1929) and Soustons.

They replace Stade Bagnères, Dax. Mazamet, Montauban and Racing.

== First round ==
In Bold the qualified teams:

- **Pool A**
  Hendaye, **Lézignan**, **Limoges**, **Lourdes** , Lyon OU
- **Pool B**
  AS Bayonne, **Carcassonne**, CASG, **Cognac** , **Pamiers**
- **Pool C**
  **Biarritz** , **Quillan** , St Girons, Vienne, **Fumel**
- **Pool D**
  **Agen** , Libourne, **Montferrand** , **US Perpignan** , Soustons
- **Pool E**
  Aviron bayonnais, SBUC, **Grenoble**, **Narbonne**, **Toulouse Olymp.EC**
- **Pool F**
  **Bordeaux**, Le Boucau, **Arlequins Perpignan** , Roanne, **Stadoceste**
- gruppo G:
  Albi, **Bègles** , **Béziers** , FC Lyon, **Pau**
- gruppo H:
  **Stade Français** , Oyonnax, Périgueux, **Tolone**, **Toulouse**

== Second round ==
In Bold the qualified teams:

- **Carcassonne** , Touloun, Fumel
- Narbonne, **Stadoceste**, Toulouse
- Lézignan, **Pau**, Perpignan
- Lourdes, Montferrand, **Stade Français**
- Cognac, **Quillan**, Toulouse OEC
- Bègles, **Biarritz**, Grenoble
- Béziers, **SA Bordeaux**, US Perpignan
- **Agen**, Limoges, Pamiers

== Quarterfinals ==
(le 13 April 1930)

April 1930	**Pau**	-	Stade Français	5–3	Clermont-Ferrand
April 1930	**Carcassonne**	-	Biarritz	18–3	Tarbes
April 1930	**Agen**	-	Stadoceste	18–0	Bordeaux
April 1930	**Quillan**	-	SA Bordeaux	10–5, o.t.	Toulouse

== Semifinals ==
4 May 1930	**Agen**	-	Pau	18–5	Bordeaux
4 May 1930	Quillan	-	Carcassonne	0–0 o.t.	Colombes
11 May 1930	**Quillan**	-	Carcassonne	3–0	Lyon

The match Agen-Pau was signed by the death of the wing of Agen Michel Pradié (18 years), after a violent tackle.

== Final ==
**Teams**	**Agen** - Quillan
**Score**	**4-0** after over time
**Date**	18 May 1930
**Venue**	Parc Lescure de Bordeaux
**Referee**	Henri Lahitte
**Line-up**
**Agen**	Marius Guiral, Lucien Augras, Max Vigerie, Guy Mieyaa, Didier Lamoulien, Louis Castaing, Gaston Capgras, Robert Samatan, Louis Dattas, Jean Dupuy, Jean-Baptiste Bédère, Etienne Dupouy, Pierre Soulès, Urbain Sourbie, Robert Gibertha
Quillan	Louis Destarac, Antonin Barbazanges, René Bonnemaison, Marcel Baillette, Marcel Soler, Amédée Cutzach, François Corbin, Eugène Ribère, Jean Galia, Charles Bigot, Germain Raynaud, Joseph Raynaud, Georges Delort, Baco, Guy Flamand
**Scorers**
**Agen**	1 drop de Guiral
Quillan

== Other competitions ==
L'Amicale Sportive Bortoise became Champione de France Honneur (2nd division) winning in the final against F:C: Saint-Claude 5−0.

In the Promotion Championship (3rd division), Stade Niortais beat Sporting Club Salonais 6−3.

En 4th division, the A.S. de la Bourse est French Champion beating US Mourillonnaise (Toulon) 10−3.

L'US Perpigan was winner of tournament for 2nd XV winning against the Stade Français 14−5.

== Sources ==
- L'Humanité, Le Figaro 1929-1930
- Compte rendu de la finale de 1930, sur lnr.fr
- finalesrugby.com
