= 1935 France–Italy rugby union match =

1935 FIRA Trophy
- Countries: France; Italy

Tournament statistics
- Champions: France

The 1935 France–Italy rugby union match was a match organized by the international Federation of amateur rugby, that took place in Rome on April 22, 1935. The game between Italy and France was the only game of the competition, although it is not registered in the annals of French rugby history. France won the game 44 - 6 over Italy, with the game being held at the Stadio Flaminio.

== Final ==
22 April 1935

France	44 - 6	Italy
Try: 2' e 4' Finat; 6' Blond; 43', 48' e 68' Fretet; 59' Coderc; 67' Laurent; 77' Dorot; 83' Boyer; Con: 6', 67', 68', 77' e 83' Chaud; Drop: 24' Chaud		Try: 70' Vinci IV; 71' Marescalchi

Stadio Flaminio, Rome
Referee: Mailhan (France)

France
Eugène Chaud
Rene Finat
Joseph Desclaux
Jean Coderc
Robert Fretet
Paul Boyer
(c) Leopold Servole
Louis Dupont
François Raynal
Jean Blond
Jacques Dorot
André Camel
Marcel Laurent
Charles Bigot
Marcel Ollivier

?

FB	15	FB
RW	14	RW
OC	13	OC
IC	12	IC
LW	11	LW
FH	10	FH
SH	9	SH
N8	8	N8
OF	7	OF
BF	6	BF
RL	5	RL
LL	4	LL
TP	3	TP
HK	2	HK
LP	1	LP
Substitutions:
Coaches

Italy
Riccardo Centinari
Aurelio Cazzini
Giuseppe Piana
Francesco Vinci III
Lucio Cesani
Pietro Vinci IV (c)
Renato de Marchis
Eraldo Sgorbati
Giuseppe Visentin
Carlo Carboni
Gastone de Angelis
Angelo Albonico
Orlando Maestri
Ottavio Bottonelli
Leandro Tagliabue

Ricardo Aymonod
Arrigo Marescalchi
Giulio Rizzoli
Filippo Caccia Dominioni

Julien Saby

== Notes and references ==
1. FIRA Trophy, France - Italy

== Bibliography ==
- (in Italian) Francesco Volpe, Paolo Pacitti (Author), Rugby 2011, pg 212.
