= Gordon Innes =

NZ international rugby union & league footballer

- Born: 8 October 1910 Dunedin, New Zealand
- Died: 6 November 1992 (aged 82) Christchurch, New Zealand
- Height: 178 cm (5 ft 10 in)
- Weight: 82 kg (181 lb)

Rugby union career
- Position: Second five-eighth
Senior career
Years	Team	Apps	(Points)
	Canterbury	31	
International career
Years	Team	Apps	(Points)
1932	New Zealand	7	(6)
- Rugby league career

Playing information
- Position: Centre
Club
Years	Team	Pld	T	G	FG	P
1933–38	Wigan	153	60	4	0	188
1938–39	Castleford	22	3	0	0	9
	Total	175	63	4	0	197
Representative
Years	Team	Pld	T	G	FG	P
1935	Rugby League XIII	1	0	0		0

Gordon Donald Innes (8 October 1910 – 6 November 1992) was a New Zealand rugby union and professional rugby league footballer who played in the 1920s and 1930s. He played representative rugby union (RU) for New Zealand and Canterbury as a second five-eighth (inside-centre), and representative rugby league (RL) for English/Rugby League XIII, and at club level for Wigan, and Castleford, as a centre.

== Early life ==
Gordon Innes was born in Dunedin, New Zealand, he was a pupil of Christchurch Boys' High School, and he died aged 82 in Christchurch, New Zealand.

== Rugby union career ==
He played 31 matches in the second five-eighth (inside-centre) position for Canterbury, and seven matches (including two test matches) for New Zealand on the 1932 New Zealand rugby union tour of Australia.

== Rugby league career ==
=== International honours ===
Gordon Innes was a member of the RFL's England, Wales and Dominion select team that claimed a 25–18 victory over France in Headingley on 6 May 1935, in celebration of King George V's Silver Jubilee.

=== County League appearances ===
Gordon Innes played in Castleford's victory in the Yorkshire League during the 1938–39 season.

=== County Cup Final appearances ===
Gordon Innes played at centre, and scored a try in Wigan's 12–21 defeat by Salford in the 1934 Lancashire Cup Final during the 1934–35 season at Station Road, Swinton on Saturday 20 October 1934.

=== Club career ===
Gordon Innes transferred from rugby union to rugby league following the 1932 New Zealand rugby union tour of Australia, Gordon Innes made his début for Wigan, as a centre, and scored a hat-trick of tries, in the 53–5 victory over Hunslet at Central Park, Wigan on Saturday 16 September 1933, he scored his last try for Wigan in the 10–13 defeat by Castleford at Central Park, Wigan on Monday 19 April 1937, and he played his last match for Wigan in the 3–16 defeat by Halifax at Thrum Hall, Halifax on Saturday 15 January 1938, he was transferred from Wigan to Castleford during the 1937–38 season, he made his début for Castleford on Saturday 5 February 1938, he played and scored a try in Castleford's 7–7 draw with Halifax in the 1937–38 Challenge Cup third-round (quarter-final) match at Wheldon Road, Castleford on Saturday 26 March 1938, and he played his last match for Castleford on Saturday 26 November 1938.
