= 1928–29 French Rugby Union Championship =

- Countries: France
- Champions: Quillan
- Runners-up: Lézignan

The 1928–29 French Rugby Union Championship of first division was won by Quillan, which defeated the Lézignan in the final.

The championship was contested by 40 clubs, divided into 8 pools of five.

== First round ==
In bold the club qualified to next round

**Pool A**

- **Albi**
- **US Carcassonne**
- FC Lyon
- **Pau**
- Périgueux

**Pool B**

- **Bayonne**
- **Grenoble**
- **Quillan**
- Racing club de France
- Toulouse Olympique EC

**Pool C**

- Stade bagnérais
- **SBUC**
- **Arlequins Perpignan**
- **Toulouse**
- Vienne

**Pool D**

- AS Bayonne
- **CASG**
- **Cognac**
- Pamiers
- **Touloun**

**Pool E**

- **Bègles**
- **Béziers**
- **Boucau**
- Saint-Girons
- Stade Francais

**Pool F**

- **Biarritz**
- Lourdes
- Montauban
- **Montferrand**
- **US Perpignan**

Gruppo G

- **Dax**
- Libourne
- **Limoges**
- **Narbonne**
- Fumel

Gruppo H

- **Agen**
- **SA Bordeaux**
- **Lézignan**
- Mazamet
- Stadoceste

== Second round ==
In bold the club qualified to next round

**Pool A**

- **Toulon**
- Toulouse
- Narbonne

**Pool B**

- v**Agen**
- Arlequins Perpignan
- Biarritz

**Pool C**

- **SBUC**
- Pau
- Montferrand

**Pool D**

- **Quillan**
- Bègles
- Limoges

**Pool E**

- **Lézignan**
- Grenoble
- Boucau

Gruppo F

- **US Carcassonne**
- Dax
- CASG

Gruppo G

- **Béziers**
- SA Bordeaux
- Albi

Gruppo H

- **US Perpignan**
- Bayonne
- Cognac

== Quarterfinals ==
1929	**Lézignan**	-	SBUC	17–5	Toulouse
1929	**Béziers**	-	Carcassonne	3–0	Narbone
1929	Agen	-	Perpignan	6–6
1929	**Agen**	-	Perpignan	15–4
1929	**Quillan**	-	Toulon	27–3

== Semifinals ==
1929	**Lézignan**	-	Béziers	9–6
1929	**Quillan**	-	Agen	17–3	Bordeaux

== Final ==
**Teams**	**Quillan** - Lézignan
**Score**	**11-8** (3-0)
**Date**	19 May 1929
**Venue**	Stade des Ponts Jumeaux, Toulouse
**Referee**	André Jasmin
**Line-up**
**Quillan**	Jean Lladères, Marcel Soler, Marcel Baillette, René Bonnemaison, Jean Bonnet, Amédée Cutzach, François Corbin, Eugène Ribère, Pierre Pourrech, Jean Galia, André Rière, Germain Raynaud, Georges Delort, Georges Martres, Guy Flamand
**Lézignan**	André Calmet, Michel Bigorre, Marius Dedieu, Robert Gachein, Pierre Cance, Louis Bès, Roger Llary, Antoine Wisser, Célestin Wisser, Arthur Boyer, Louis Haener, André Clady, Léon Duezo, Maurice Porra, Léopold Fabre
**Scorers**
Quillan	3 tries Bonnet, Rière, Baillette; 1 conversion de Ribère
**Lézignan**	2 tries Clady and Fabre; 1 conversion de Clady

== Other competitions ==
In the French Championship "Honneur" (Second division), Roanne beat Olympique de Carmaux in the final, 11–0.

In the Promotion (3rd division), the FC Auscitain beat l'US, 6–3.

In Fourth Division, the Club Amical de Morcenx beat Saint-Marcellin, 16–0.

Le Stade Français was French Champion for 2nd XV, beating Biarritz, 3–0.

== Sources ==
- L'Humanité, 1928-1929
- Compte rendu de la finale de 1929, sur lnr.fr
- finalesrugby.com
