= Andre Camel =

Andre Camel may refer to:

- André Camel (1905 – 1980), French rugby union footballer who played in the 1920s and 1930s
- André Camel (Case Closed), a fictional FBI agent in Case Closed
