= 1925–26 French Rugby Union Championship =

- Countries: France
- Champions: Toulouse
- Runners-up: US Perpignan

The 1925–26 French Rugby Union Championship was won by the club of Toulouse that defeated the US Perpignan.

The Stade Toulousain won the fourth title on five years (after won in 1922, 1923 and 1924).

The championship was contested by 36 teams divided into 12 pools of three.

The first of each pool was qualified for the four pools of Quarter of finals.

== First round ==
In bold team qualified

- **Pool A**
  - **Narbonne** 6 pts
  - Brive 4 pts
  - Châteaurenard 2 pts
- **Pool B**
  - **US Perpignan** 6 pts
  - Lyon OU 3 pts
  - Hendaye 3 pts
- **Pool C**
  - **US Perpignan** 6 pts
  - UA Libourne 3 pts
  - Cognac 3 pts
- **Pool D**
  - **Toulouse** 6 pts
  - Dax 3 pts
  - Angoulême 3 pts
- **Pool E**
  - **Stadoceste** 5 pts
  - SBUC 4 pts
  - Bergerac 3 pts
- **Pool F** :
  - **Béziers** 5 pts
  - Albi 4 pts
  - Montferrand 3 pts
- **Pool G** :
  - **Toulouse Olympique EC** 6 pts
  - Pau 4 pts
  - Toulon2 pts
- **Pool H** :
  - **Bayonne** 6 pts
  - Lézignan 4 pts
  - Montauban 2 pts
- **Pool I**
  - **Lourdes** 6 pts
  - CASG 4 pts
  - AS Bayonne 2 pts
- **Pool J** :
  - **Carcassonne** 6 pts,
  - SA Bordeaux 4 pts,
  - Boucau 2 pts
- **Pool K** :
  - **Grenoble** 6 pts
  - Biarritz 4 pts
  - Limoges 2 pts
- **Pool L**
  - Stade Français 5 pts
  - Begles 4 pts
  - Périgueux 3 pts

== Quarter of finals ==
- **Pool A** :
  - **US Perpignan** 6 pts,
  - Toulouse Olympique EC4 pts
  - Stade Français 2 pts
- **Pool B** :
  - **Stadoceste** 5 pts
  - Carcassonne4 pts
  - Grenoble 3 pts
- **Pool C**
  - **Bayonne** 6 pts
  - Narbonne 4 pts
  - Lourdes 2 pts
- **Pool D** :
  - **Toulouse** 6 pts
  - Béziers 4 pts,
  - Arlequins Perpignan 2 pts

== Semifinals ==
apr. 1926	**Toulouse**	-	Bayonne	6 - 3	Bordeaux

apr. 1926	Perpignan	-	Stadoceste	0 - 0
apr. 1926	**Perpignan**	-	Stadoceste	6 - 0	Toulouse

== Final ==
Teams	**Toulouse** - Perpignan
Score	**11-0** (3-0)
Date	2 May 1926
Venue	Parc Lescure de Bordeaux
Referee	Marcel Heurtin
Line-up
Toulouse	André Pépion, Clément Dulaurens, François Borde, Jacques Ballarin, François Raymond, Henri Sémat, Bernard Bergès, Alex Bioussa, Marcel Camel, Albert Cazenave, André Camel, Pierre Peyronnel, Gabriel Grioterray, Jean Larrieu, Jean Morère
US Perpignan	Etienne Radondy, Marcel Baillette, André Puigt, Roger Ramis, René Tabès, Joseph Pascot, Jean Carbonne, Eugène Ribère, Ernest Camo, Georges Constant, André Rière, Marcel Henric, Camille Montadé, Georges Delort, Joseph Sayrou
Scorers
Toulouse	3 tries Raymond, Cazenave, Borde; 1 conversion de Sémat
US Perpignan

== Other competitions ==
The 2 May 1926, in the final of "Championnat de France Honneur" (Second division), the Racing defeated SC Mazamet 17-3.

The SA Saint-Sever won the "Promotion" championship (3rd division) winning against The Dijon 16-11.

Le Stade Toulousain est champion of "2nd XV Championship" winning against the Stadoceste.

== Sources ==
- L'Humanité, 1926
- Compte rendu de la finale de 1926, sur lnr.fr
- finalesrugby.com
