= 1935 French Rugby League Cup final =

	1	2	Total
LYO	7	15	22
CAT	7	0	7
- Date: 5 May 1935
- Stadium: Stade Jacques-Thomas
- Location: Toulouse, Haute-Garonne
- Referee: Albert Dupouy
- Attendance: 6,000

Broadcast partners
- Broadcasters: n/a

The 1935 French Rugby League Cup final was the inaugural final of the French Rugby League Cup (French: Coupe de France de Rugby à XIII), the country's original and premier knockout competition for the sport of rugby league football. It took place on 5 May 1935, at Stade Jacques-Thomas in Toulouse.

== Pre-game ==
=== Venue selection ===
Early into the season, newspaper Paris-soir relayed information from French league secretary Maurice Blein, suggesting that the final of the 1934-35 French Rugby League Cup could be hosted in Paris. By early 1935, it was widely being reported that the final would be taking place in Toulouse, a crucial market for French rugby, whose control could reshape the balance of power between the two codes. and sports daily L'Auto posited that it would "likely not take place in Paris". After Lyon-Villeurbanne qualified for the final, its president Joseph Pansera claimed that his stadium offered better amenities and revenue prospects than Stade Jacques-Thomas, the only league-friendly venue in Toulouse, and that XIII Catalan had agreed to play in Villeurbanne. Again, Paris-soir called the Villeurbanne move a done deal. But other papers printed a rebuke by the league, saying that neither Paris nor Villeurbanne had ever had been under serious consideration, and that only Bordeaux—where earlier games had drawn large crowds—would be considered as a possible alternative to Toulouse. Following much speculation, the league upheld its decision, and on 30 April ordered both teams to play in Toulouse.

=== Possible date change ===
In April, the French league was called upon by the RFL to send the French national team to Leeds on 6 May for a game against an England and Wales select squad, organized in honor of King George V's Silver Jubilee. It was initially announced that the French Cup final would be moved one week earlier, on 28 April, to present the best possible roster for the event. but this was quickly rescinded. Galia expressed interest in postponing the final, but this did not come to pass either, possibly to avoid going head-to-head with the final of the French Rugby Union Championship, which was played at Toulouse's Stade des Ponts Jumeaux the following weekend. The Cup final kept its original 5 May date and the Team France traveled without players from the two finalist clubs. Both teams arrived in Toulouse by train in the evening of the day before the final.

=== Weather disruption ===
On the eve of the game, the roof protecting the main stands was torn off by wind bursts, and torrential rains poured over the city for a large part of game day, offering less than enticing conditions to prospective attendees. Tickets cost between 5 and 15 francs apiece, but some who had booked at the higher price to be seated under a roof filed complaints when they found it gone. Members of the press were also left to work under the rain.

=== Curtain raiser ===
At 13:15, Stade Jacques-Thomas' resident organization Gallia Club de Toulouse (not relation with Jean Galia), recent converts to rugby league who were not participating in the championship, played an exhibition against a team from Espéraza as a curtain raiser to the final. The Espéraza squad featured several defectors from the nearby US Quillan union club that had been at the center of a shamateurism controversy a few years earlier, and of which several French league pioneers were alumni. Gallia Club won by a score of 35–0.

== Game summary ==
Like the semifinal played on the same ground, the final was refereed by retired union international Albert Dupouy of Bordeaux, although his officiating was looser in the climactic game. Despite not being announced on the pre-game roster, René Barnoud was inserted in the middle of Lyon's threequarter line, while Lucien Lafond, who was previously assigned to the position, was moved to the forward lines.

The game started at a breakneck pace. XIII Catalan put on 7 points in the opening eight minutes. They notched a penalty kick by François Noguères right at the start of the game, followed by a try from Jean Azais. The conversion attempt failed, and they narrowly missed on a second try by Aimé Barde, but Noguères kicked a 35-metre drop from a narrow angle soon after. That would be all the offensive success they would get for the entire game. Lyon opened their scoring 17 minutes in via a Robert Samatan try, which was converted, followed by a drop kick from Henri Marty at the 25th minute, which brought the score to a 7–7 tie. The rest of the first period and the initial part of the second saw Lyon assert their dominance, with sporadic counterattacks by the Catalans. However, they had to wait until the 60th minute to break through. Barbazanges started an offensive rush at the 50 metre line, then passed to Laurent Lambert for slick corner try, which was converted. In the final eight minutes, Lyon provided another offensive flourish with tries by Amila and Barnoud, both converted, sealing the score at a hefty 22–7.

Outside of Perpignan's early push, pre-game favorites Lyon dominated the action. Despite being overmatched, the Catalans' forward pack earned praised for its tenacity, especially Gilbert Ponramon. But its offense was no match for Lyon's, especially their most talented player Robert Samatan, who found vindication on Toulouse soil, a few years after his falling out with rugby union's Stade Toulousain, where he had been forbidden from playing at his preferred position. The play was quite rough in the second half, with XIII Catalan suffering the brunt of it, successively losing top offensive contributor François Noguères, Roger Ramis and Aimé Barde for significant chunks of the game. Lyon's Lucien Lafond was expelled for his hit on Barde. The game received moderately positive reviews, largely due to Lyon's quality roster, but the standard of play was somewhat compromised by the heavy rain.

=== Match details ===
5 May 1935
15:00

US Lyon-Villeurbanne	22–7	XIII Catalan
Tries: Samatan, Lambert, Amila, Barnoud; Goals: Barnoud (4); Penalty: Amila; Drop goals: Marty		Tries: Azais; Goals: n/a Penalty: Noguères; Drop goals: Noguères

Stade Jacques-Thomas, Toulouse
Attendance: 6,000
Referee: Albert Dupouy

=== US Lyon-Villeurbanne ===
Fullback: Henri Marty
Threequarters: René Barnoud, Antonin Barbazanges, Gaston Amila, Laurent Lambert
Halfbacks: Robert Samatan (fly-half), Charles Mathon (scrum-half)
Forwards: Gustave Genevet (lock), Joseph Griffard, Joseph Perrin (second row), ? Barcella or Lucien Lafond, Auguste Anclades or Lucien Lafond, Paul Piany or Lucien Lafond (front row)

=== XIII Catalan ===
Fullback: Jean Cassagneau
Threequarters: Aimé Barde, François Noguères, Roger Ramis, Jean Azaïs
Halfbacks: Serre Martin (fly-half), Philippe Ascola (scrum-half)
Forwards: Gilbert Ponramon (lock), André Bruzy, Octave Triquera (second row), Georges Fontvieille, François Forma, Louis Sayrou (front row)

== Game against Challenge Cup winners ==
Thanks to cooperation between the French and English leagues, both French Cup and English Challenge Cup finals took place on the same weekend and, to support the new French tournament, it was decided that the Challenge Cup winners would travel to metro Paris the following weekend to face their gallic counterparts in a special unification game. The RFL representative, Castleford, narrowly beat Lyon-Villeurbanne by a score of 24–21. It is prior to that game, rather than directly after the Coupe de France final, that RFL representatives handed over to the French the trophy that would become the emblem of their main knockout competition, the Lord Derby Cup.
