= 1926–27 French Rugby Union Championship =

- Countries: France
- Champions: Toulouse
- Runners-up: Stade Français

The 1926–27 French Rugby Union Championship of first division was won by Toulouse that beat Stade Français in the final.

Le Stade Toulousain conquest his fifth Bouclier de Brennus in six year.

== Context ==
The 1927 Five Nations Championship was won by Ireland and by Scotland, the France was last.

== First round ==
The first two of each pool admitted to next round.

It was assigned 3 points for victory, 2 for draw, 1 for lost match, 0 point in case of forfeit.

- Pool A :
  Lézignan 11 pts
  Albi 10 pts
  Toulon7 pts
  Angoulême 6 pts
  Dax 6 pts,
- Pool B :
  Béziers 10 pts
  Libourne 10 pts
  Agen 9 pts
  Soustons 7 pts
  Cavaillon 4 pts
- Pool C :
  Pau 12 pts
  SA Bordeaux 10 pts
  Montferrand8 pts
  Toulouse Olymp.EC 6 pts
  Brive 4 pts
- Pool D :
  Stade Français 12 pts
  Stadoceste 10 pts
  SBUC 8 pts
  Biarritz 6 pts
  Périgueux4 pts
- Pool E :
  Carcassonne 10 pts
  Grenoble 10 pts
  Hendaye 10 pts
  Pamiers 6 pts
  CASG 4 pts

Tie-Break: Grenoble – Hendaye 12–10

- Pool F :
  Toulouse12 pts
  US Perpignan 10 pts
  Begles 8 pts
  Limoges 6 pts
  Villeneuve 4 pts
- Pool G :
  Cognac 11 pts
  Narbonne 8 pts
  Lourdes 8 pts
  Montauban 7 pts
  Bayonne 6 pts

Tie-Break: Narbonne Lourdes 6–3

- Pool H :
  Quillan 12 pts
  Racing 8 pts
  Lyon OU 8 pts
  Mazamet 6 pts
  Boucau 6 pts

Tie-Break: :Racing – Lyon OU 19 – 6

== Second round ==
The winner of each group admitted to semifinals

- Pool A :
  Toulouse 8 pts
  Carcassonne8 pts
  Racing Paris 5 pts
  UA Libourne 3 pts
  Tie-Break: :Toulouse – AS Carcassonne 6–0
- Pool B :
  Pau 9 pts
  Stadoceste 7 pts
  Albi 5 pts
  Béziers 3 pts
- Pool C :
  SA Bordeaux' 8 pts
  US Perpignan 7 pts
  Cognac 5 pts
  Quillan 4 pts
- Pool D :
  Stade Français 7 pts
  Lézignan 7 pts
  Narbonne 7 pts
  Grenoble 3 pts
  Tie-Break:
  Stade Français.- Narbonne 10 a 8
  Stade Français- FC Lézignan 11 a 5

== Semifinals ==
May 1926	Toulouse	-	SA Bordeaux	34–9	Pau
May 1926	Stade Français	-	Pau	12–0	Bordeaux

== Final ==
Teams	Toulouse – Stade Français
Score	19–9 (5–5)
Date	29 May 1927
Venue	Stade des Ponts Jumeaux, Toulouse
Referee	Louis Capelle
Line-up
Toulouse	Gabriel Serres, Gabriel Gras, Gabriel Griotteray, André Camel, Pierre Peyronnel, Alex Bioussa, Maurice Latrille, Marcel Camel, Bernard Bergès, René Corbarieu, Clément Dulaurens, François Borde, René Salinié, François Raymond, Louis Magnol
Stade Français	Pierre Lassau, René Laffond, Paul Olivary, Chaya Leib Herzowitz, Richard Majérus, Branca, Pierre Moureu, Jean Duhau, Georges Daudignon, André Verger, Adolphe Jauréguy, Jean Saint-Germain, Henri Bernadac, Robert Houdet, Louis Courtejaire
Scorers
Toulouse	5 tries Dulaurens (2), Borde, Bergès, A.Camel; 2 conversions de Salinié
Stade Français	1 try Daudignon; 1 conversion de Herzowitz; 1 drop de Verger
