= Château de Fondat =

Château in Nouvelle-Aquitaine, France

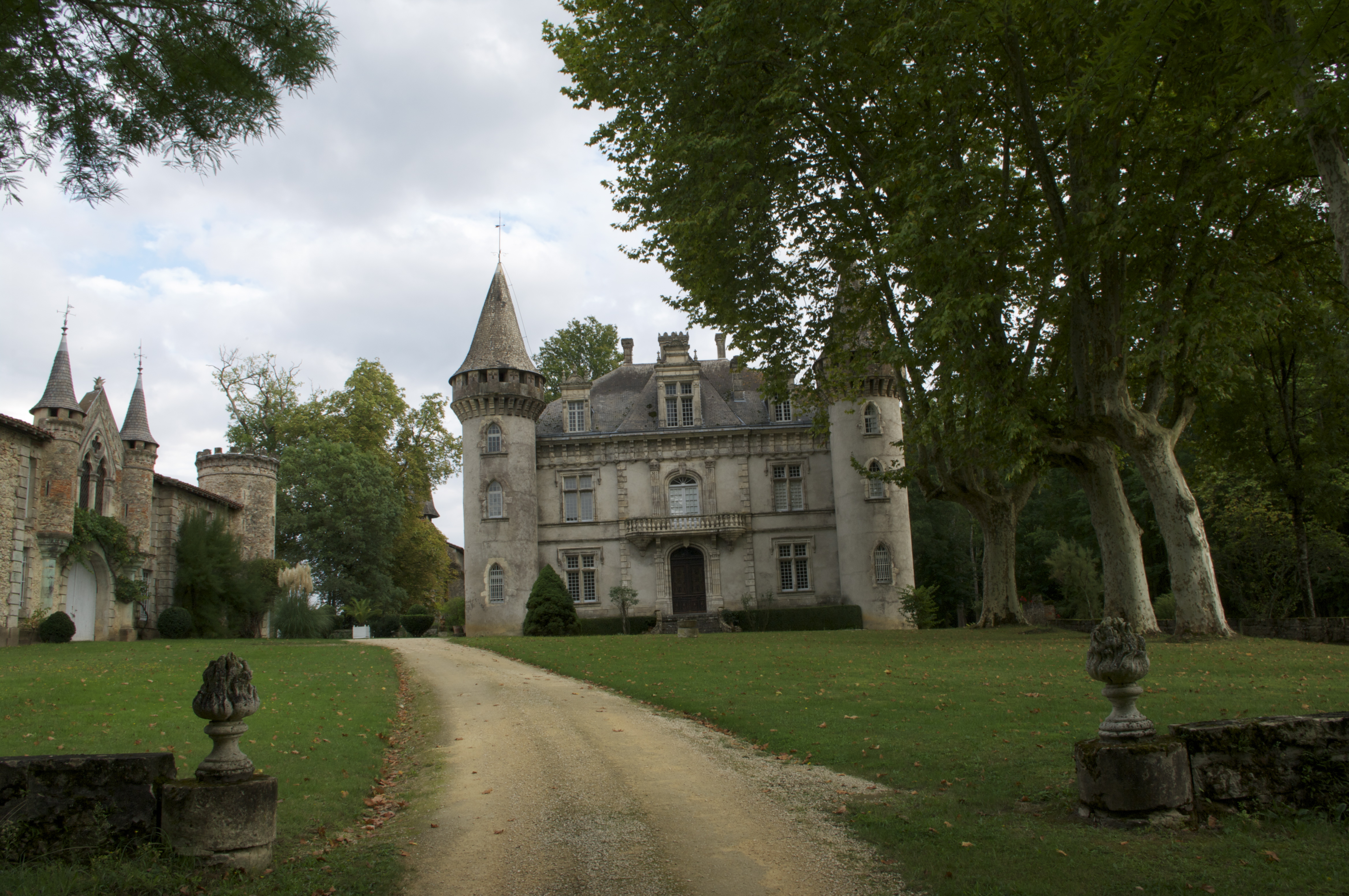
- Western face of the Château and the left of the Grand Pavilion
- Interactive map of Château de Fondat
- Location: Saint-Justin, Landes, France
- Coordinates: 43.9847°N 0.2°W
- Type: Château
- Completion date: 17th Century

The Château de Fondat is a château in the French commune of Saint-Justin, in Landes, Nouvelle-Aquitaine, France. It was built in the Neo-Renaissance style in the 17th century, and became classified as a National Heritage Site of France, a Monument historique, on 31 March 1999.

== History ==
The lords of the region occupied the Fondat estate from the Middle Ages onwards, but in 1607, a noble family from Marsan bought it, keeping it until the end of the 19th century. The château has been destroyed on two occasions, and in the middle of the 17th century it was reconstructed. Later, in the 19th century, it was renovated once more in the Neo-Renaissance style.

This château is one part of a larger group of outbuildings, including:

- An armagnac storehouse constructed in the 16th/17th century
- A dovecote from the 17th century
- The Grand Pavilion which was renovated in the 19th century to fit the image of the Château itself
- A Medici fountain
- A fishpond from the 17th century, which is used as a fish reserve
- A park with exotic trees which are approximately 200 years old

== Gallery ==
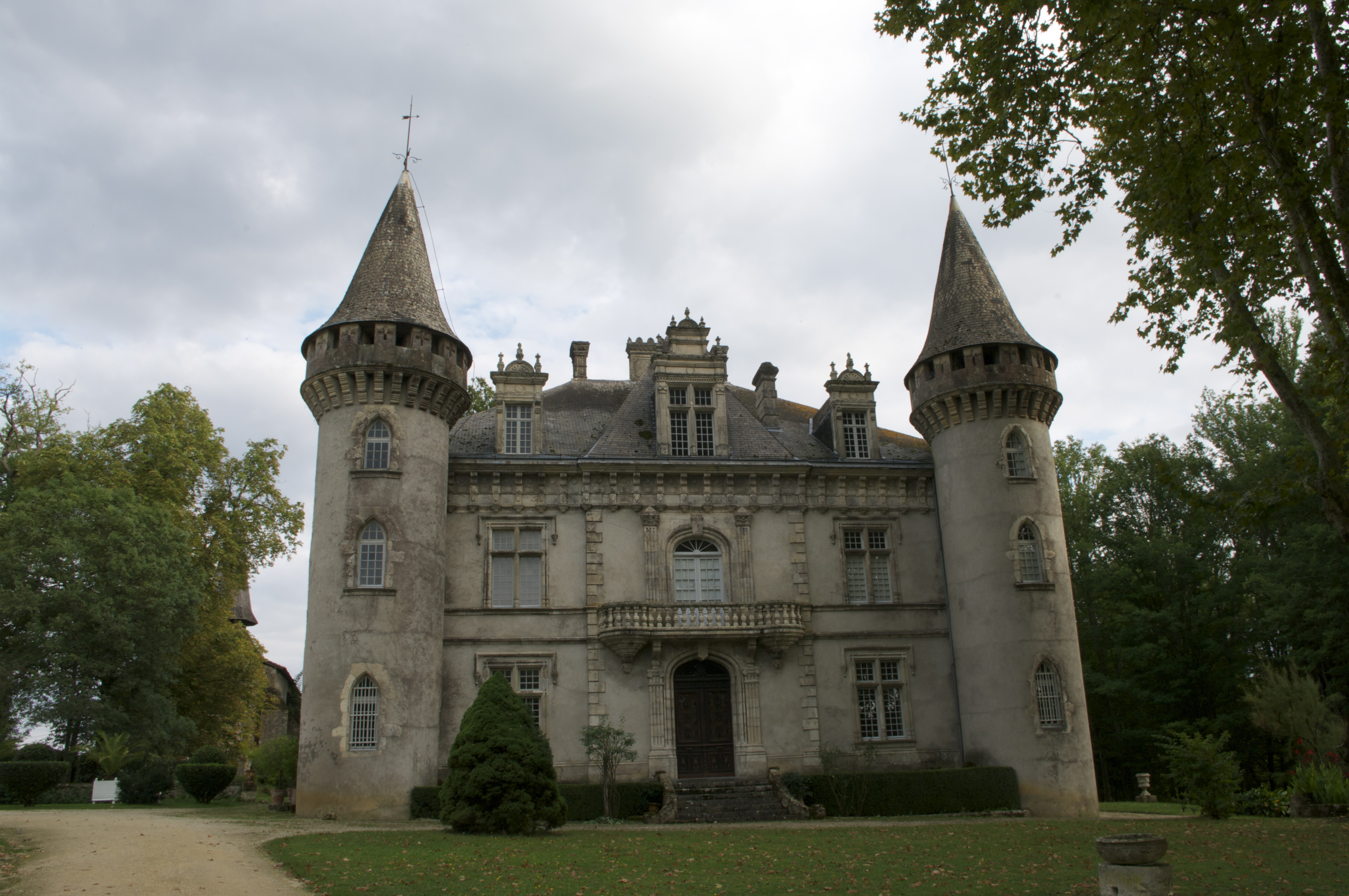
Western face of the Château

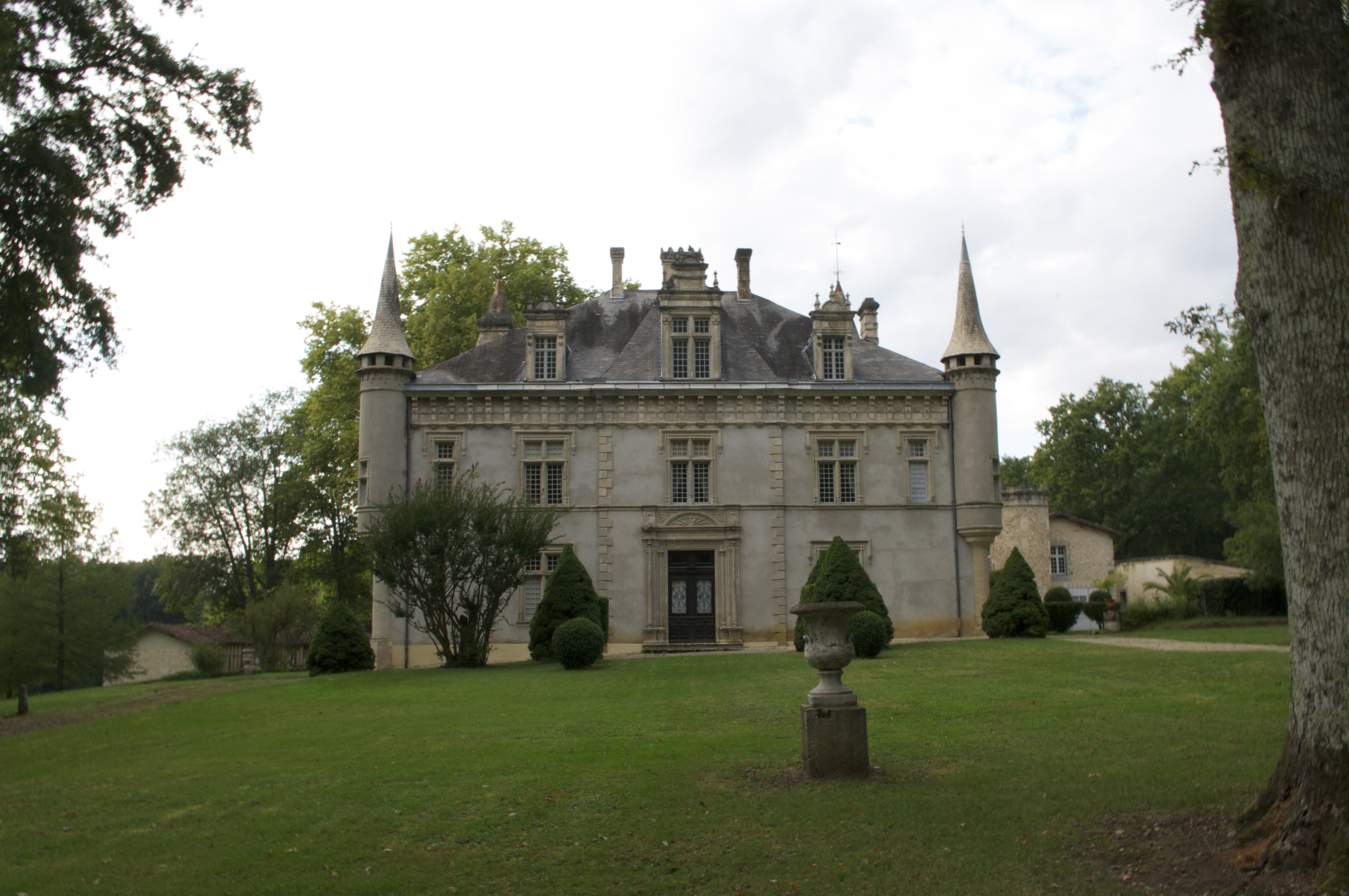
Eastern face of the Château

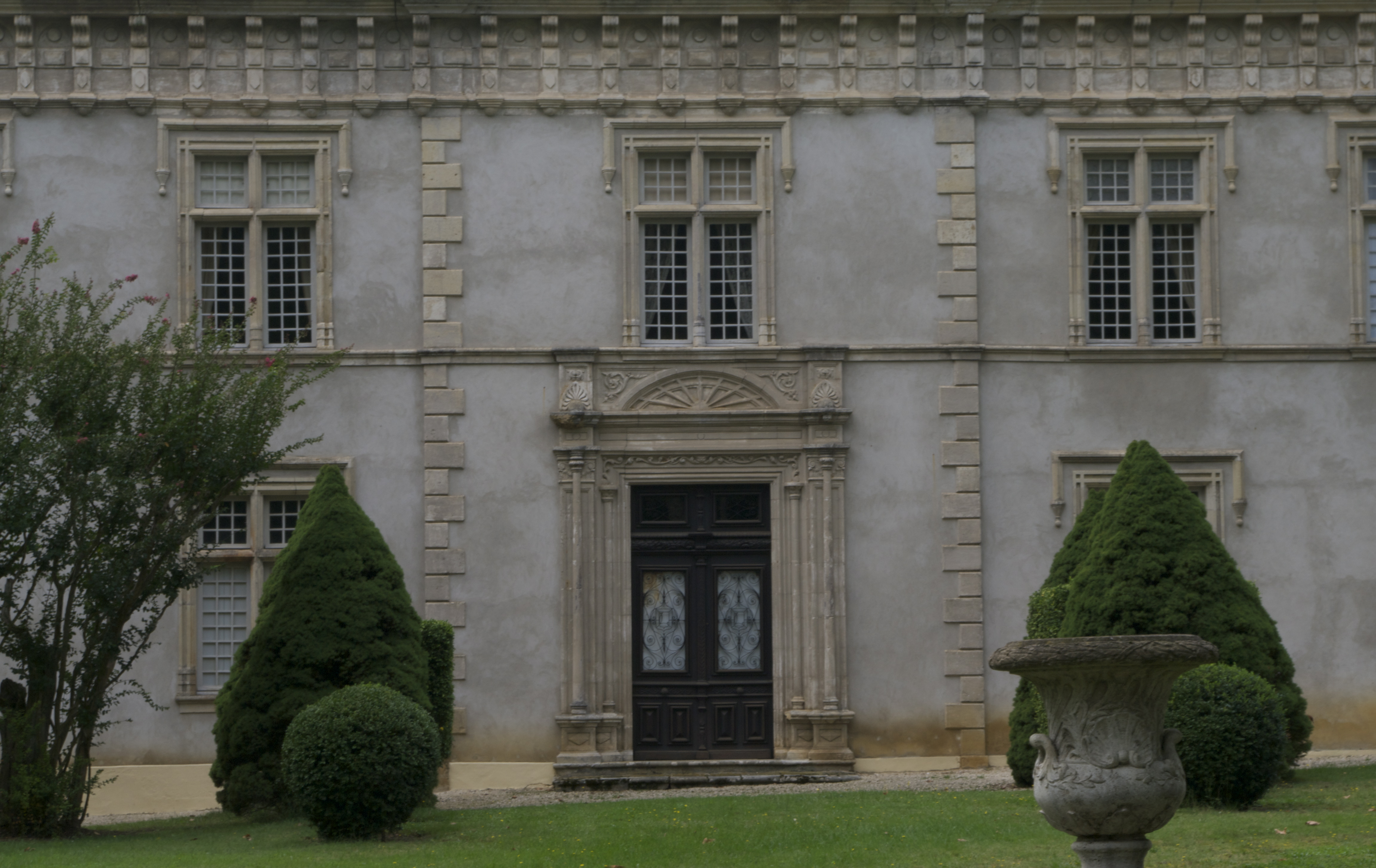
Close-up of the eastern face of the Château

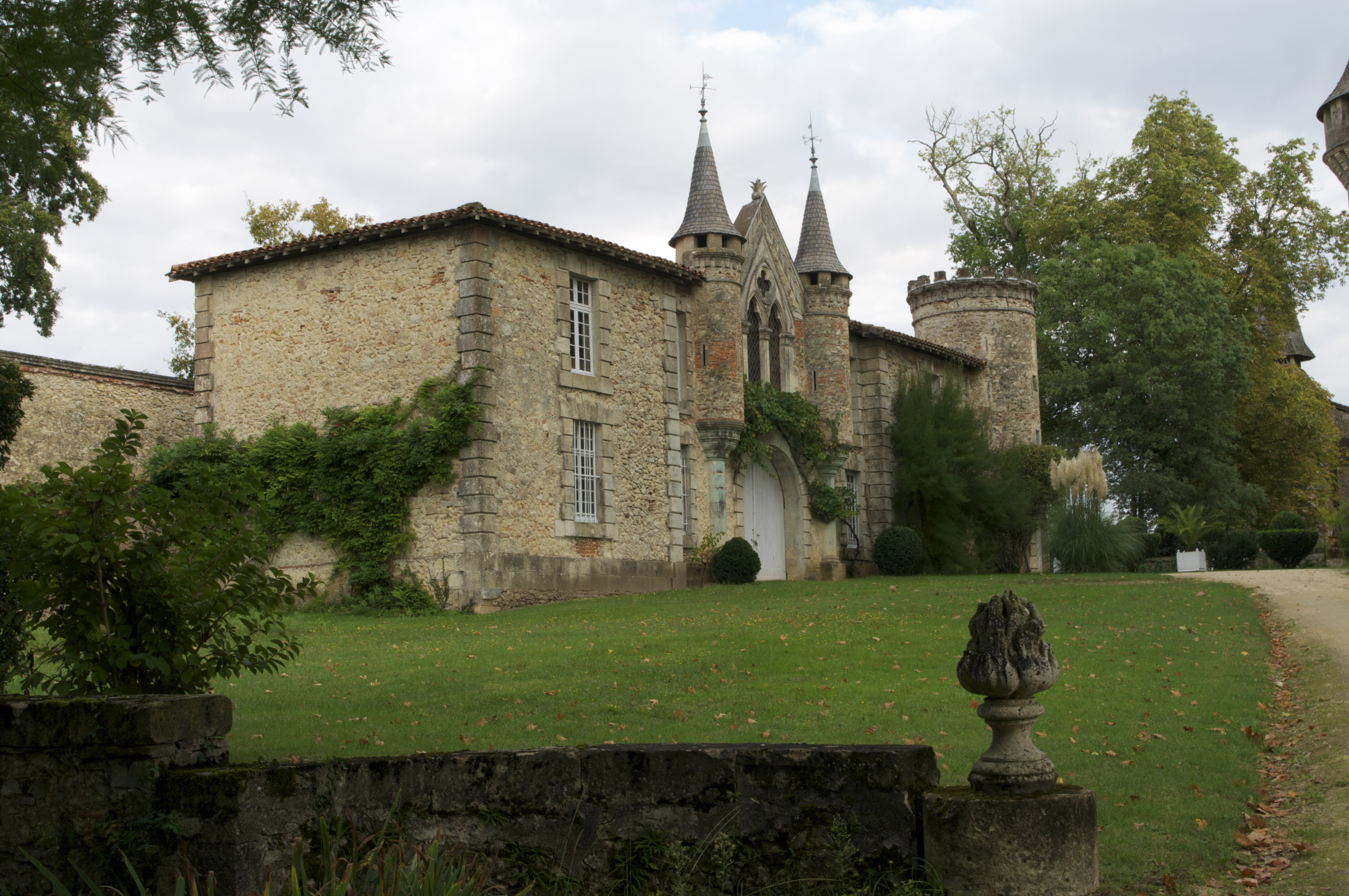
Eastern face of the Grand Pavillon

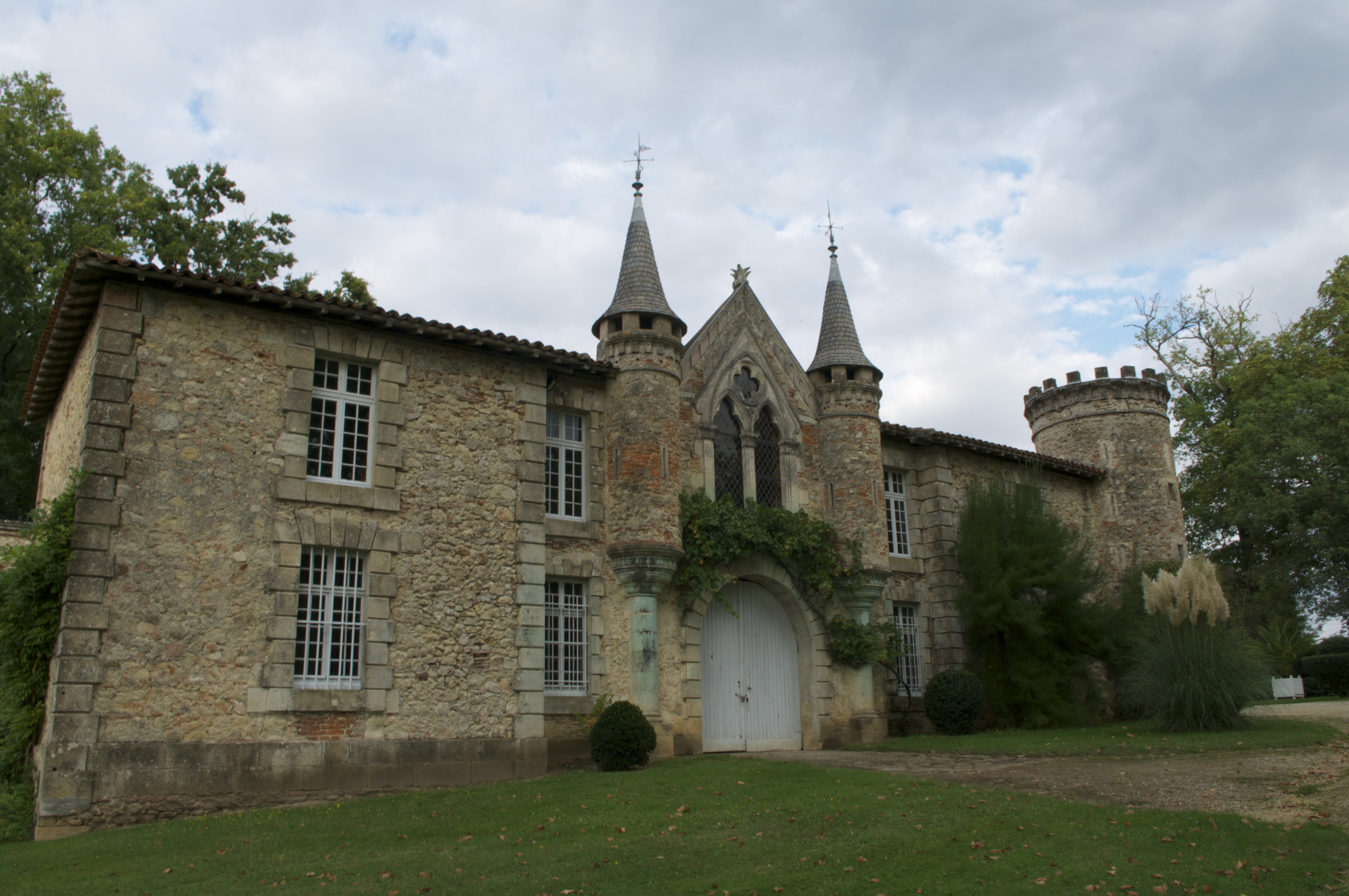
Eastern face of the Grand Pavillon

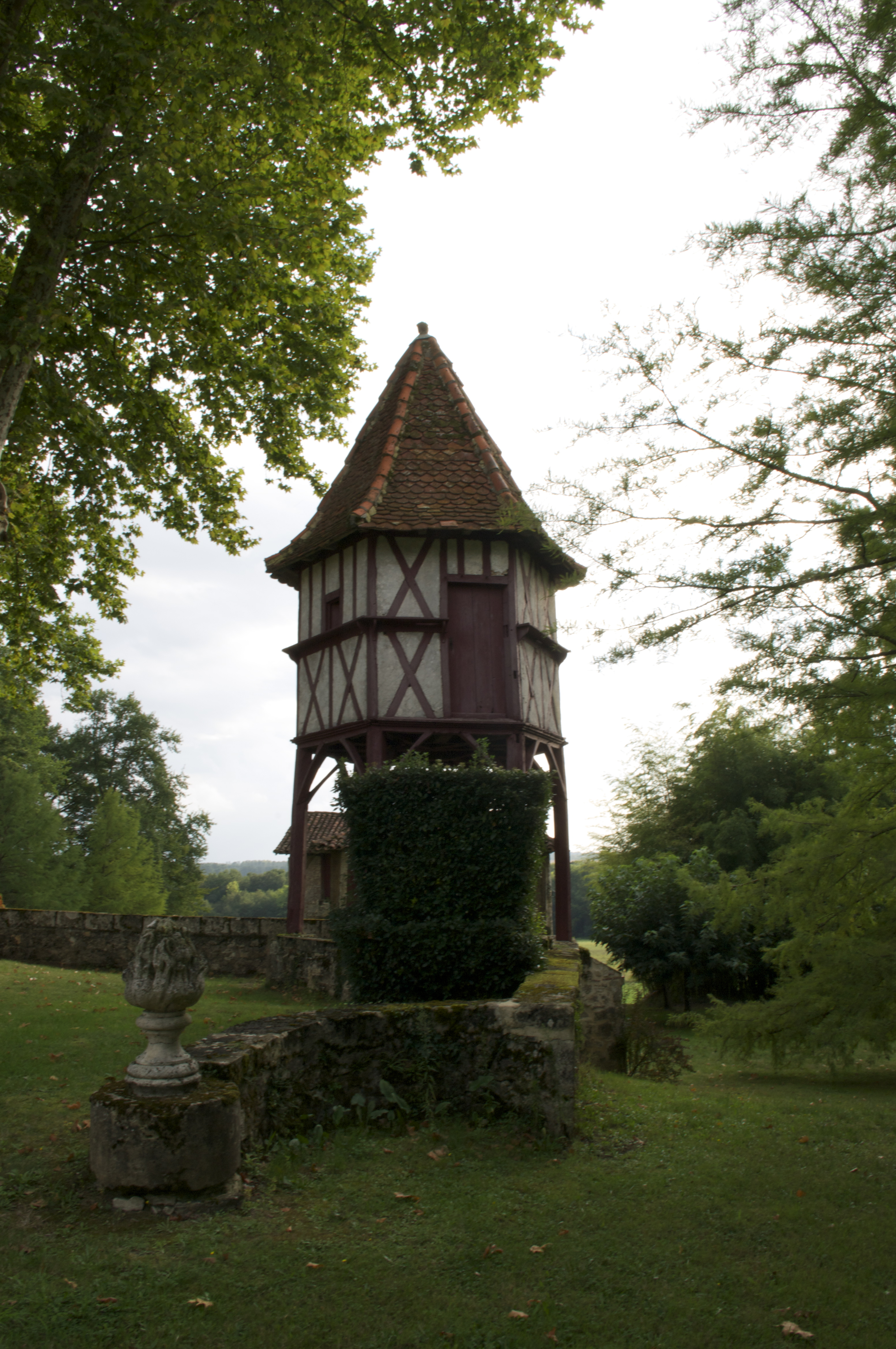
The dovecote

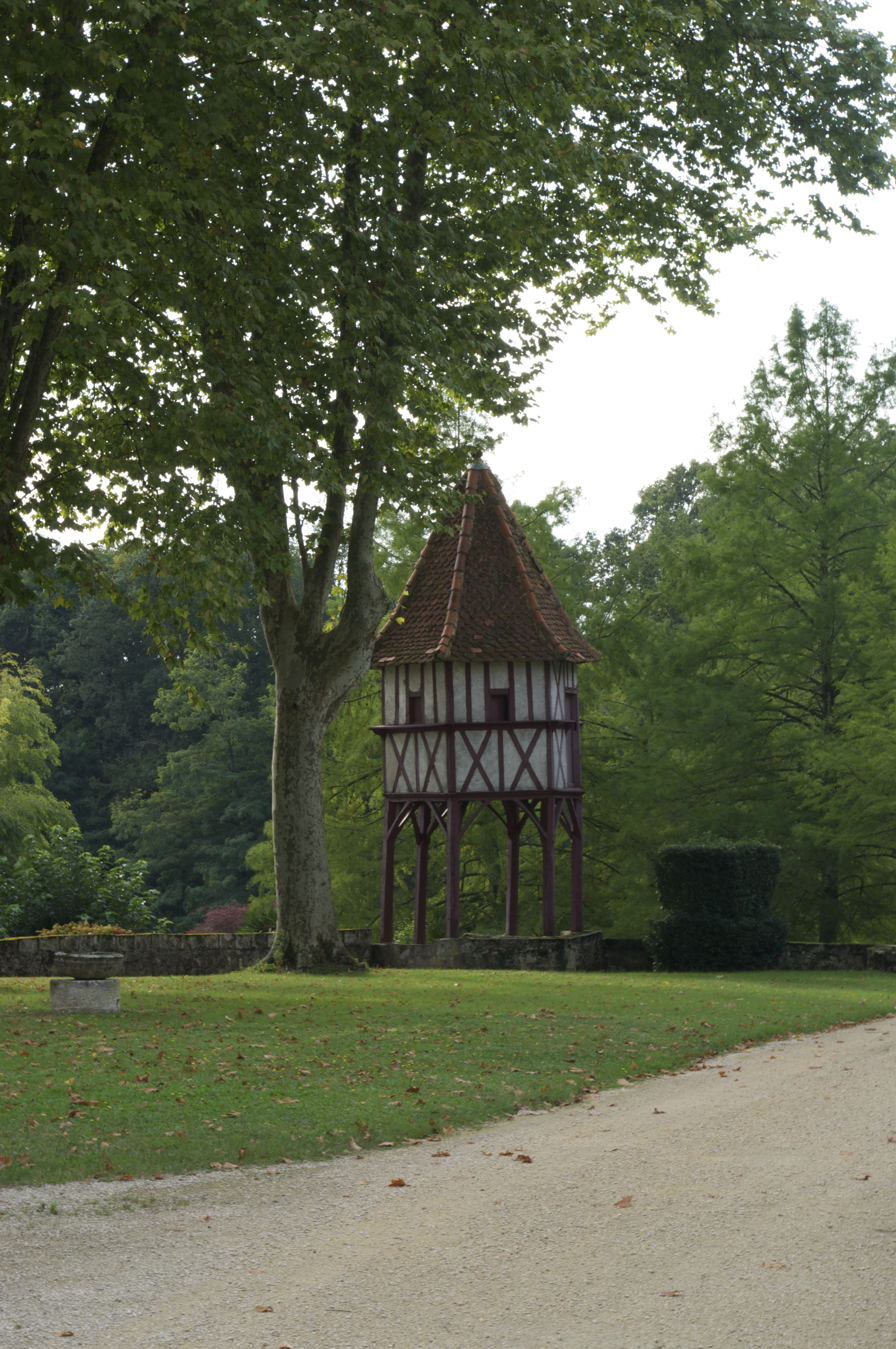
The dovecote
