= Claude Mantoulan =

Former France dual-code international rugby footballer

Personal information
- Born: 5 March 1936 Pau, Pyrénées-Atlantiques, France
- Died: 9 September 1983 (aged 47) Perpignan, France

Playing information
- Height: 1.75 m (5 ft 9 in)
- Weight: 72 kg (11 st 5 lb)

Rugby union
- Position: Fly-half
Club
Years	Team	Pld	T	G	FG	P
19??–59	Section Paloise
Representative
Years	Team	Pld	T	G	FG	P
1959	France	1	0	0	0	0

Rugby league
- Position: positions, stand-off
Club
Years	Team	Pld	T	G	FG	P
1960–67	Roanne
1967–70	XIII Catalan
	Total	0	0	0	0	0
Representative
Years	Team	Pld	T	G	FG	P
1959–70	France	40				49
- Source: As of 18 January 2021

Claude Mantoulan, nicknamed La Mantoule, (Pau, 5 March 1936 – Perpignan, 9 September 1983) was a French rugby union and rugby league player.

== Biography ==
A fly-half, centre or fullback, he had excellent technical and offensive qualifies but his defense was average.

Opting for rugby league, he is, after Gilbert Benausse, the second most capped player of the France national rugby league team.

== Rugby union career ==
=== Club ===
- Section Paloise
  - Runner-up at the Challenge Yves du Manoir (1959)

=== France national team ===
- International (1 capt) against Ireland (18) before the 1959 Five Nations Championship won by France.

== Rugby league career ==
=== Club ===
- Roanne XIII
- XIII Catalan

==== Palmarès ====
- French Champion with Roanne XIII (1960), and XIII Catalan (1969)
- Winner of the Lord Derby Cup with Roanne XIII (1962), and XIII Catalan (1969)
- Runner-up of the French Championship with Roanne XIII (1961), and XIII Catalan (1970)
- Runner-up of the Lord Derby Cup with XIII Catalan (1967)

=== France national team ===
- International (46 caps) between 1959 and 1970 (his debut was against Australia (1959)).
- Took part at the 1960 Rugby League World Cup
