= Second five-eighths =

Rugby union position

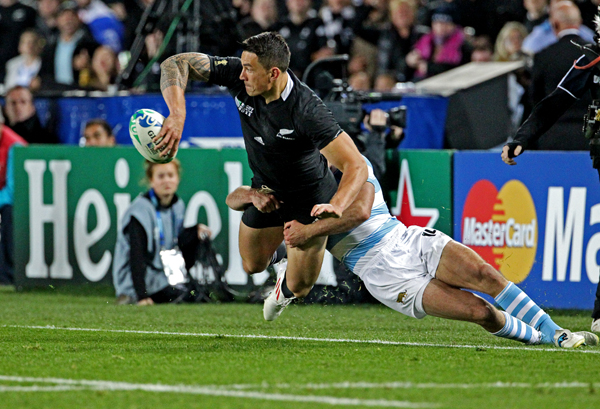
Second five-eighths Sonny Bill Williams is known for his offloading skills

Second five-eighths, or sometimes second five-eighth, is a name used in New Zealand to refer the rugby union position commonly known elsewhere as the inside centre or number 12.

It traditionally described a playmaking type of 12 with good passing and kicking skills as opposed to the strong hard runner and tackler in that position providing less game-management and attacking options. Some second five-eighths such as Sonny Bill Williams and Ma’a Nonu, however, combine aspects of both styles of play.

== Etymology ==
The 1903 All Black captain, Jimmy Duncan, is credited with coining the name five-eighths when he decided to take a player from the forwards to add to the backs. The backs at that time consisted of two half-backs, three three-quarters, and a full-back. As the additional player stood between half-back and three-quarters, Duncan came up with the term five-eighths according to the fraction between them.

The player at five-eighths, also known as the five-eighth, could take the ball back to the forwards or pass it on to the three-quarters. This backline innovation occurred before the split between rugby union and rugby league in Australia and New Zealand and the term is now commonly used for the five-eighth position in rugby league football.

As the game of rugby union evolved, the two half-back positions acquired separate functions. The outside half-back, now known as the outhalf or fly-half, became the first five-eighths in New Zealand under the two five-eighths system. The next player on his outside was called the second five-eighths.

The terms first-five and second-five are sometimes used as abbreviated versions of first five-eighths and second five-eighths, respectively.

== Notable second five-eighths ==
New Zealand All Blacks:

- Walter Little
- Aaron Mauger
- Ma'a Nonu
- Tana Umaga
- Sonny Bill Williams

Australian Wallabies:

- Tim Horan
- Matt Giteau
- Christian Lealiifano
- Matt To'omua

== See also ==
- Rugby union positions§Centre

== Sources ==
- Quinn, Keith (1993). The Encyclopedia of World Rugby. ABC Books. ISBN 978-0-7333-0146-9.
