= Aldo Quaglio =

French former dual-code international rugby footballer

- Born: 26 September 1929 Saverdun, Ariège, Occitania, France
- Died: 9 March 2017 (aged 87) Lavelanet, France
- Height: 175 cm (5 ft 9 in)
- Weight: 88 kg; 13 st 13 lb (195 lb)

Rugby union career
Senior career
Years	Team	Apps	(Points)
1947-48	US Saverdun		
1949-54	Stade Lavelanétien		
1954-59	SC Mazamet		
International career
Years	Team	Apps	(Points)
1957-59	France	13	(0)
- Rugby league career

Playing information
- Position: Prop, positions
Club
Years	Team	Pld	T	G	FG	P
1960–63	Roanne
1963–65	AS Carcassonne
	Total	0	0	0	0	0
Representative
Years	Team	Pld	T	G	FG	P
1960–63	France	17	0	0	0	0

Aldo Quaglio (Saverdun, 12 February 1932 – Lavelanet, 9 March 2017) was a French rugby union and rugby league player. He represented France at the 1960 Rugby League World Cup and played in 14 rugby league tests for France.
