= Thézan-lès-Béziers =

- Commune
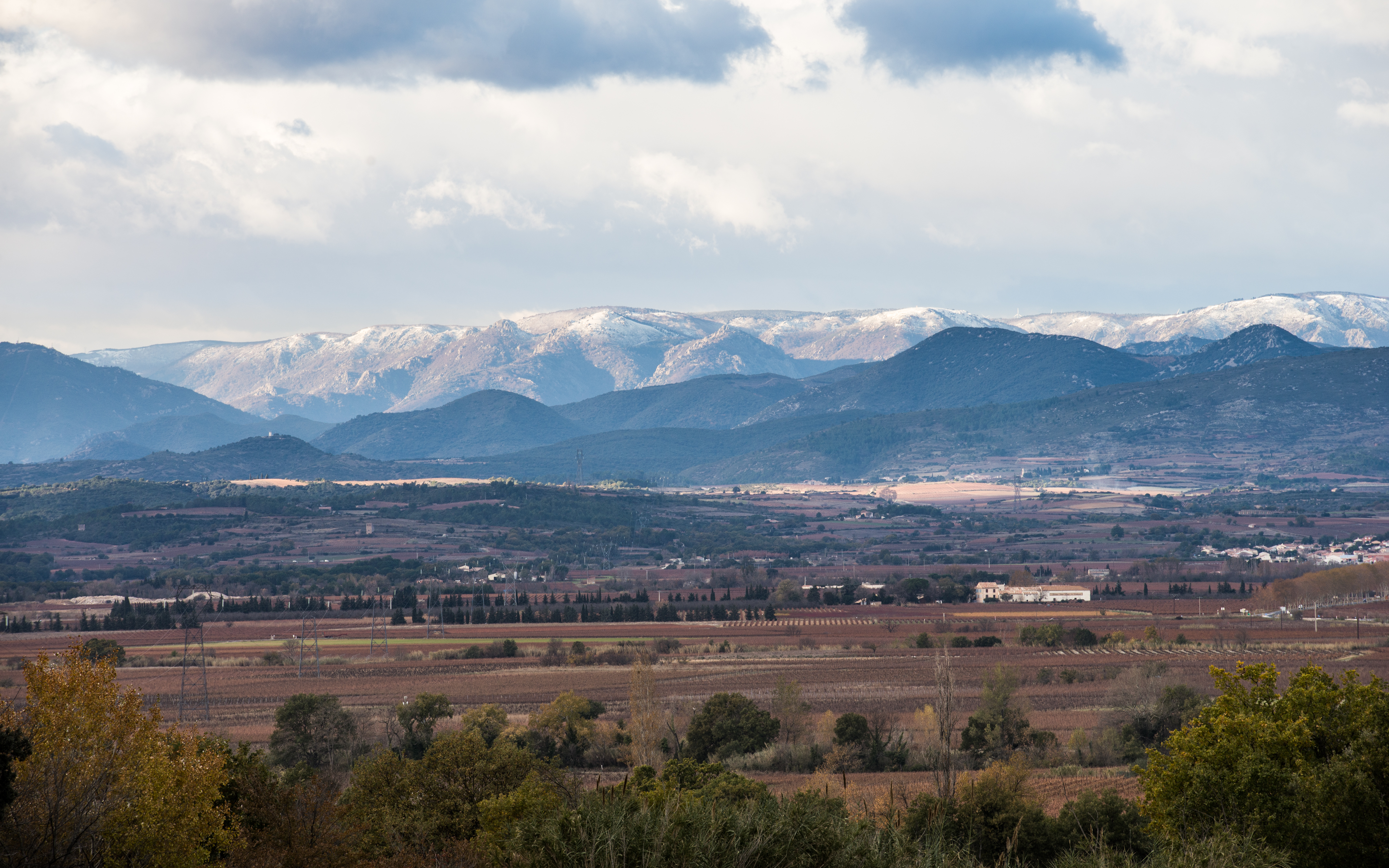
- The Montagne Noire and part of the commune of Thézan-lès-Béziers

- Coat of arms
- Location of Thézan-lès-Béziers
- Location within France Location within Occitanie
- Coordinates: 43°25′21″N 3°10′14″E
- Country: France
- Region: Occitania
- Department: Hérault
- Arrondissement: Béziers
- Canton: Cazouls-lès-Béziers
- Intercommunality: CC Les Avant-Monts

Government
  - Mayor (2020–2026): Alain Duro
- Area^{1}: 13.65 km^{2} (5.27 sq mi)
- Elevation: 63 m (207 ft)
- Highest elevation: 132 m (433 ft)
- Lowest elevation: 15 m (49 ft)
- Population (2023): 3,124
  - Density: 228.9/km^{2} (592.8/sq mi)
- Time zone: UTC+01:00 (CET)
  - Summer (DST): UTC+02:00 (CEST)
- INSEE/Postal code: 34310 /34490
- ^{1} French Land Register data, which excludes lakes, ponds, glaciers > 1 km^{2} (0.386 sq mi or 247 acres) and river estuaries.

Thézan-lès-Béziers (French pronunciation: [tezɑ̃ lɛ bezje], Thézan near Béziers; Languedocien: Tesan de Besièrs) is a commune in the Hérault department in the Occitanie region in southern France.

== Population ==
Historical population
Year	Pop.	±% p.a.
1968	1,499	—
1975	1,957	+3.88%
1982	2,016	+0.43%
1990	2,008	−0.05%
1999	2,077	+0.38%
2007	2,484	+2.26%
2012	2,776	+2.25%
2017	2,987	+1.48%
2023	3,124	+0.75%
Source: INSEE

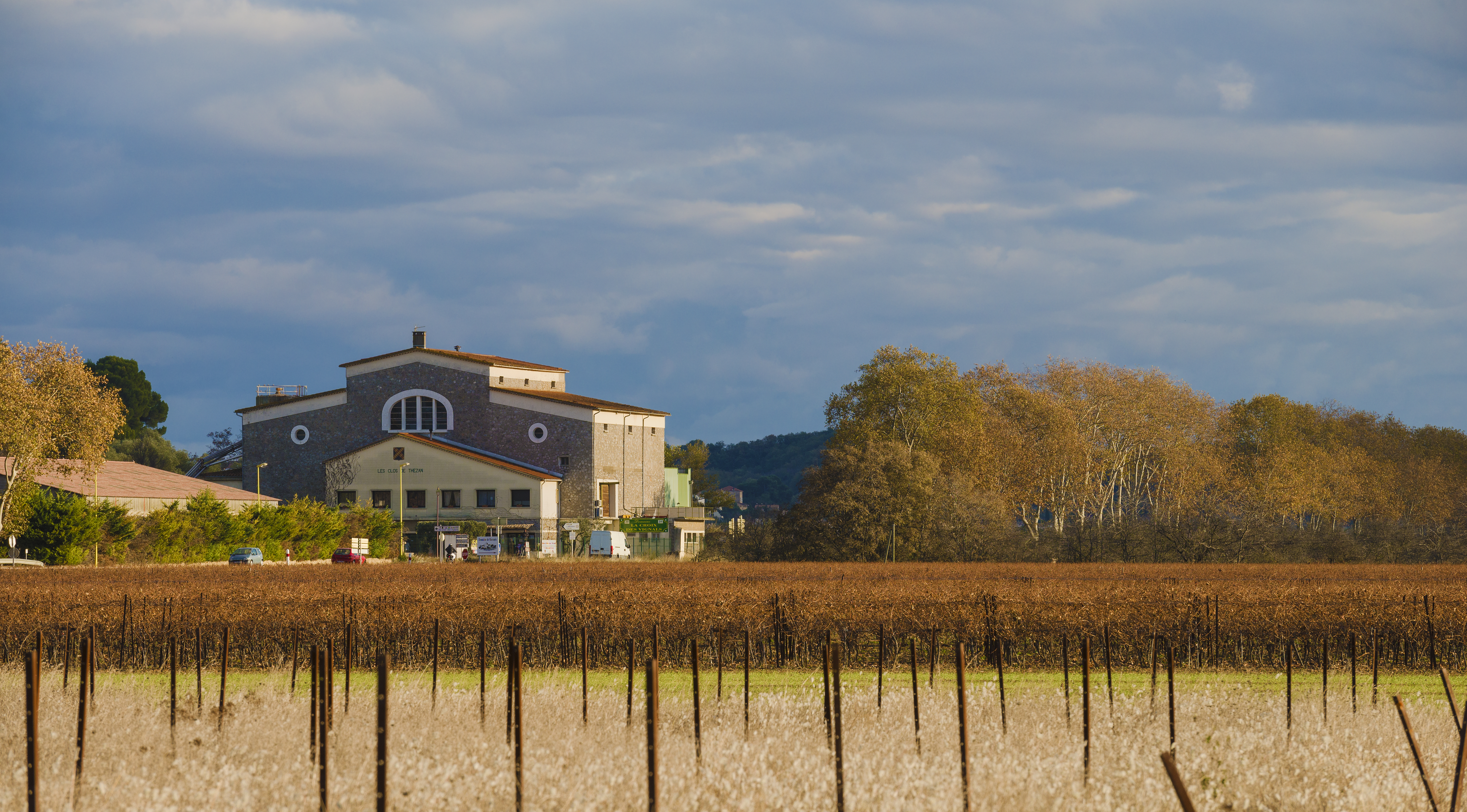
The winemaking cooperative.

== See also ==
- Communes of the Hérault department
