= Saint-Justin, Landes =

Saint-Justin
- Commune
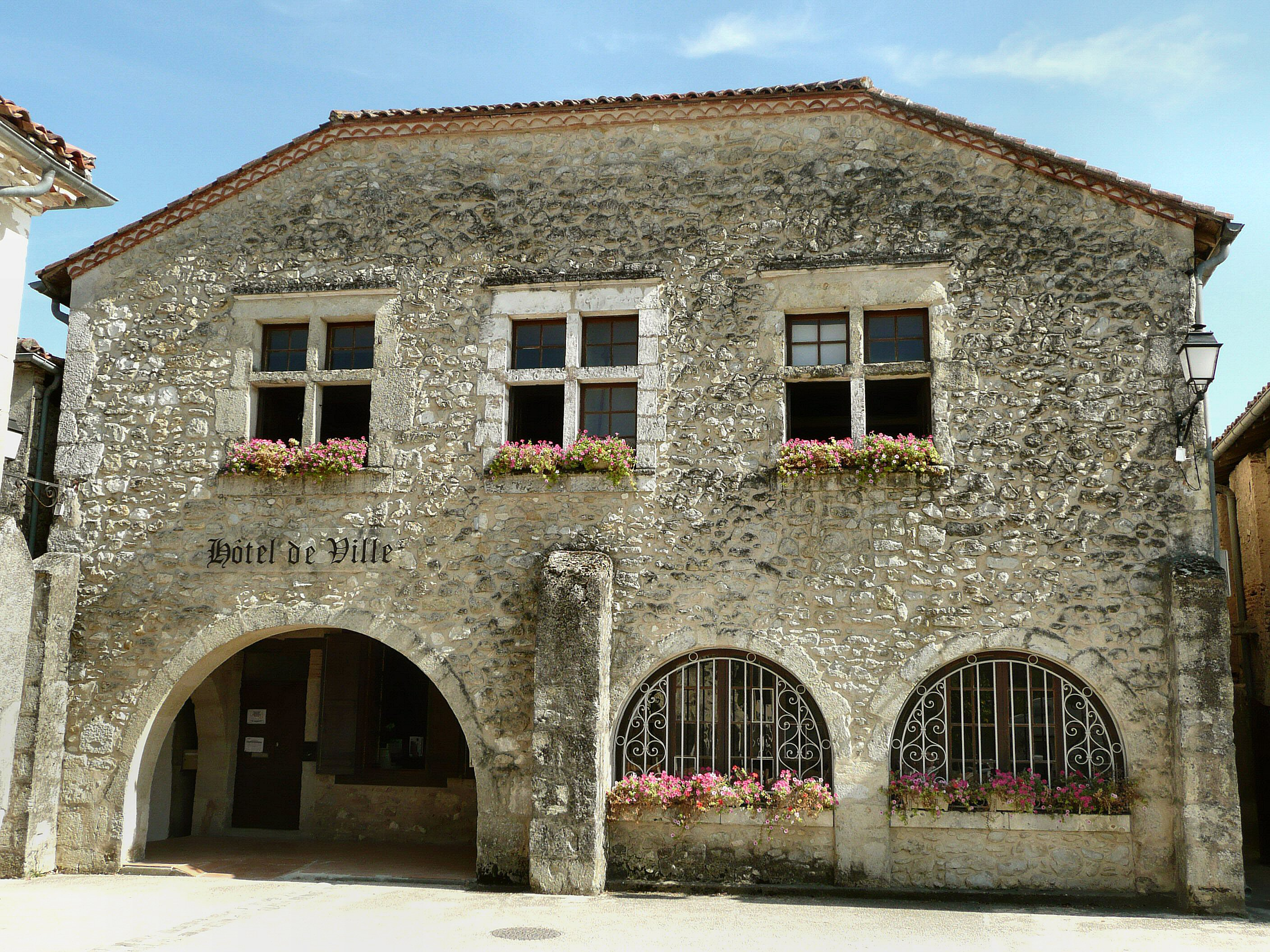
- Town hall
- Location of Saint-Justin
- Location within France Location within Nouvelle-Aquitaine
- Coordinates: 43°58′52″N 0°13′48″W
- Country: France
- Region: Nouvelle-Aquitaine
- Department: Landes
- Arrondissement: Mont-de-Marsan
- Canton: Haute Lande Armagnac

Government
  - Mayor (2020–2026): Philippe Latry
- Area^{1}: 65.62 km^{2} (25.34 sq mi)
- Elevation: 90 m (300 ft)
- Highest elevation: 151 m (495 ft)
- Lowest elevation: 62 m (203 ft)
- Population (2023): 1,008
  - Density: 15.36/km^{2} (39.79/sq mi)
- Time zone: UTC+01:00 (CET)
  - Summer (DST): UTC+02:00 (CEST)
- INSEE/Postal code: 40267 /40240
- ^{1} French Land Register data, which excludes lakes, ponds, glaciers > 1 km^{2} (0.386 sq mi or 247 acres) and river estuaries.

Saint-Justin (French pronunciation: [sɛ̃ ʒystɛ̃]; Occitan: Sent Justin) is a commune in the Landes department in Nouvelle-Aquitaine in southwestern France.

== History ==
In 1280, Constance Viscountess de Marsan signed an “acte de paréage” (a shared sovereignty agreement) with the Order of chivalry of the Hospitallers of St. John of Jerusalem, with which they founded the new Bastide of Saint-Justin. This agreement was signed without the authorization of Edward I, King of England, then Duke of Aquitaine.

== Structure ==
The fortified town of Saint-Justin has the typical rectangular central square covered with arches and surrounded by half-timbered and stone houses with mullioned windows. Under the arcades, there are many shops, providing a walk for pedestrians and shelter from sun and rain. The town has three octagonal towers and a walkway along the ramparts and the tower wall.

== Population ==
Historical population
Year	Pop.	±% p.a.
1968	1,082	—
1975	973	−1.51%
1982	914	−0.89%
1990	917	+0.04%
1999	888	−0.36%
2007	873	−0.21%
2012	962	+1.96%
2017	974	+0.25%
2023	1,008	+0.57%
Source: INSEE

== See also ==
- Château de Fondat
- Communes of the Landes department
