= Jean Dauger =

Former France international dual-code rugby footballer

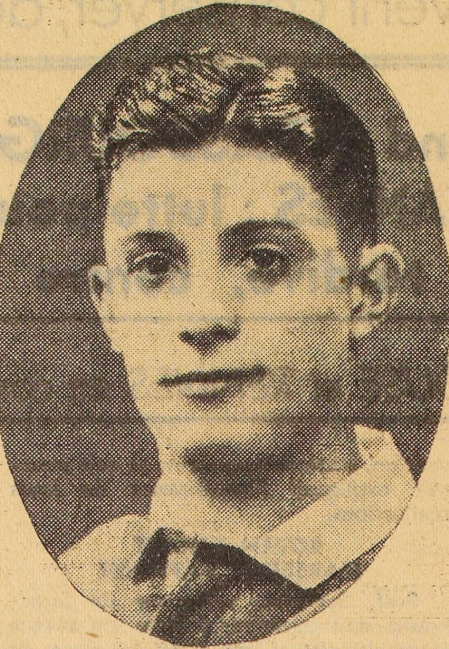
- Portrait of Jean Dauger in 1938

Personal information
- Born: 12 November 1919 Cambo-les-Bains, Pyrénées-Atlantiques, Nouvelle-Aquitaine, France
- Died: 23 October 1999 (aged 79) Cambo-les-Bains, France

Playing information
- Height: 183 cm (6 ft 0 in)
- Weight: 83 kg; 184 lb (184 lb)

Rugby union
- Position: Centre
Club
| Years | Team | Pld | T | G | FG | P |
|---|---|---|---|---|---|---|
| 1936–38 | Aviron Bayonnais |
| 1941–56 | Aviron Bayonnais |
| | Total | 0 | 0 | 0 | 0 | 0 |
Representative
| Years | Team | Pld | T | G | FG | P |
| 1945–53 | France | 3 | 2 | 0 | 0 | 6 |

Rugby league
- Position: Centre
Club
| Years | Team | Pld | T | G | FG | P |
|---|---|---|---|---|---|---|
| 1938–41 | RC Roanne XIII |
Representative
| Years | Team | Pld | T | G | FG | P |
| 1938–39 | France | 5 | ? |

Jean Dauger (Cambo-les-Bains, 12 November 1919 – 12 October 1999) was a French rugby union and rugby league footballer. He played as a centre. He was nicknamed Manech, which is a Lower Navarre Basque translation of his given name.

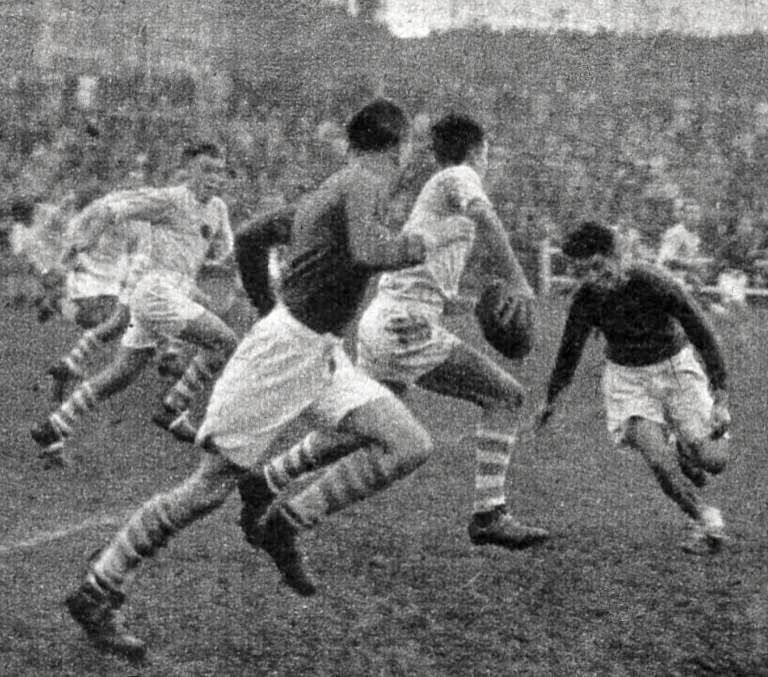
Jean Dauger, playing centre with the ball for Aviron Bayonnais, against RCF at Stade Jean Bouin (October 1942).

== Career ==
Dauger first started his career at 17 years, as first-choice for Bayonne in 1936 while he was working locally at the cadastre.

In 1938, he shifts to the semi-professionalism of rugby league, playing for RC Roanne XIII alongside Robert Samatan and Max Rousié while working for the Devernois factory, not appreciating the pseudo-amateur mores of the championship at the time. He was considered by the rugby league literature as "an attack prince", "an exceptional back with dazzling start-up and an ultra-developed sense of game".

In 1941, he returned to Bayonne as the Vichy regime and its Révolution nationale had banned rugby league.

His two union international caps in 1945 for France on 1 January 1945 against Army Rugby Union (greeted by Jacques Chaban-Delmas, who will play alongside him in the following test cap against the British Empire XV on 28 April 1945), caused a very grave crisis against other national teams, being the reason of an eight-year eclipse. His last cap was on 10 January 1953, also brought a new crisis against Scotland.

He still would play for Bayonne until 1956; he is the great centre who inspired his successors such as Maurice Prat, Roger Martine and André Boniface. He was also the spiritual son of former Agen and Roanne player Robert Samatan.

Later, Dauger became a journalist for Paris-Presse and wrote a book dedicated to rugby: Histoires... de rugby' (published by Calmann-Levy in 1965, redacted in 1967) with a preface written by Jean Prat, as well Le Rugby en dix leçons.

In 1973, he was the coach France national rugby union team alongside Jean Desclaux.

From 3 June 2001, in his memory, Aviron Bayonnais' home stadium, Parc des Sports Saint-Léon was renamed Stade Jean Dauger.

His daughter Michou married Jean Grenet, mayor of Bayonne and president of Aviron; their son François Grenet was a professional footballer with clubs including Girondins de Bordeaux.

== Rugby union career ==
- Aviron Bayonnais
- Champion of France (1943)
- Vice-Champion of France (1944)

=== Other ===
- Coupe de France finalist for the Côte Basque-Béarn representative team (on 10 April 1944).

=== International ===
- International (3 caps) - (1945 and 1953 Five Nations Championship)

== Rugby league career ==
- RC Roanne XIII
- Champion of Lord Derby Cup with Roanne (1938)
- Champion of France with Roanne (1939)
