= Eugène Chaud =

France international dual code rugby player

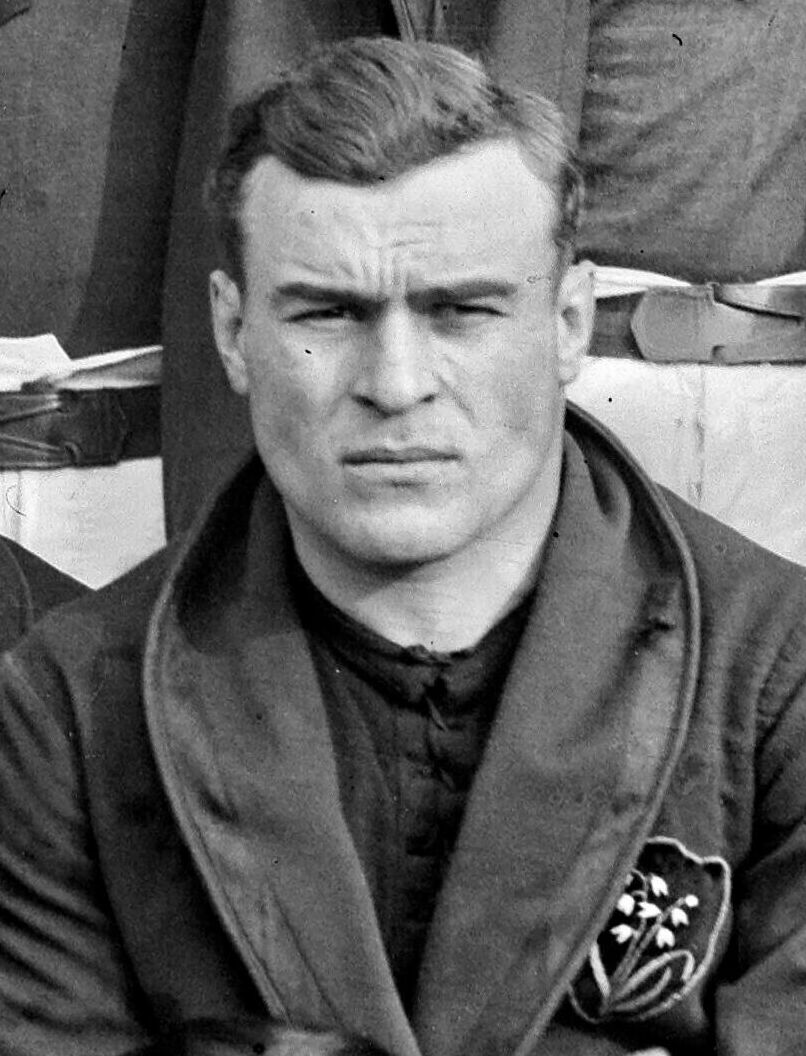

Personal information
- Born: 2 March 1906 Roanne, France
- Died: 14 June 1984 (aged 78) Brignoles, France

Playing information

Rugby union
- Position: Fullback / Wing
Club
Years	Team	Pld	T	G	FG	P
193?–35	RC Toulon
Representative
Years	Team	Pld	T	G	FG	P
1932–35	France	3				16

Rugby league
- Position: Fullback
Club
Years	Team	Pld	T	G	FG	P
1935–40	RC Roanne
Representative
Years	Team	Pld	T	G	FG	P
1936–38	France	2				0

Eugène Chaud (2 March 1906 – 14 June 1984) was a French international rugby footballer.

== Rugby career ==
A dual-code international, Chaud started out in rugby union with RC Toulon and was a member of their 1931 Brennus Shield–winning team. His official international appearances were limited to matches against Germany, as France were barred from the Five Nations at this time. He switched to rugby league at the end of 1935 to join hometown club RC Roanne XIII and was capped for France as a fullback.

Chaud also competed at the French Athletics Championships in sprinting.

== See also ==
- List of France national rugby union players
