= Max Rousié =

Former France dual-code international rugby player

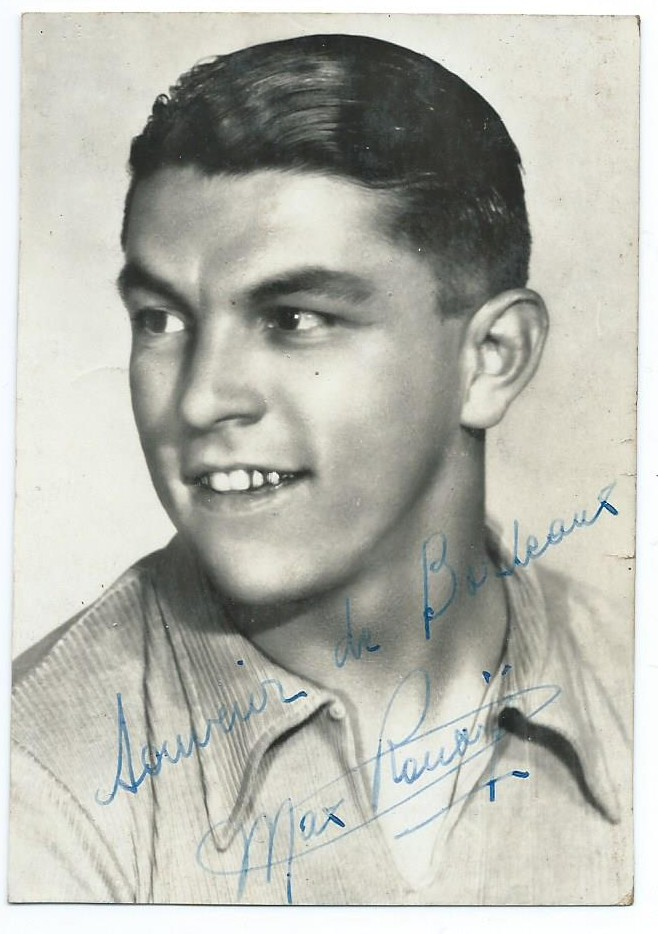

Personal information
- Full name: Georges Rousié
- Born: 14 July 1912; Marmande, Lot-et-Garonne, Nouvelle-Aquitaine, France
- Died: 2 June 1954 (aged 41); Saint-Justin

Playing information
- Height: 178 cm (5 ft 10 in)
- Weight: 83 kg (13 st 1 lb)

Rugby union
Club
| Years | Team | Pld | T | G | FG | P |
|---|---|---|---|---|---|---|
| 1927–34 | CA Villeneuve |
| 1940–43 | RC Nice |
| | Total | 0 | 0 | 0 | 0 | 0 |
Representative
| Years | Team | Pld | T | G | FG | P |
| 1931–33 | France XV | 4 | | | | 9 |

Rugby league
- Position: centre, fullback, wing
Club
| Years | Team | Pld | T | G | FG | P |
|---|---|---|---|---|---|---|
| 1934–36 | Villeneuve-sur-Lot |
| 1936–39 | RC Roanne XIII |
| | Total | 0 | 0 | 0 | 0 | 0 |
Representative
| Years | Team | Pld | T | G | FG | P |
| 1935–39 | France XIII | 15 | 3 | 10 | 3 | 35 |

Max Rousié (18 July 1912 – 2 June 1959) was a French rugby league and rugby union footballer who rose to prominence in the 1930s. He was a dual-code international, eventually becoming captain of the French rugby league team.

He was born in Marmande, Lot-et-Garonne, and died in a car crash in 1959 in Saint-Justin, Landes.

== Playing career ==
=== Rugby Union ===
Playing as scrum-half in rugby union (he also could play as fly-half, in the back row or also in the second or third row) for Club Athlétique Villeneuvois (CAV XV) and later, in league for Sport Athlétique Villeneuvois (SAV.13) between 1934 and 1936, later for RC Roanne XIII until the war and the suppression of rugby league. A powerful and fast player, he also was an excellent kicker.

He started playing Rugby Union with CA Villeneuve and became one of the best players of his time, with four caps with the France national team between 1931 and 1933. In 1934, he is one of the rugby union personalities to join the new rugby code which took place in France le rugby à XIII, rugby league. He is considered as one of the best players of this code imported by Jean Galia. Until the World War II and the prohibition of rugby league, he is the most capped player for France, which under his captaincy, he led to its first European Nations Cup in 1939, along with François Noguères, Maurice Brunetaud and Joseph Desclaux. At club level, he first remains in Villeneuve-sur-Lot winning a French Championship title in 1935 along with Marius Guiral and Galia, later he joined Roanne with the same success, a victory in the French Championship in 1939 alongside Jean Dauger, Henri Gibert and René Arotça.

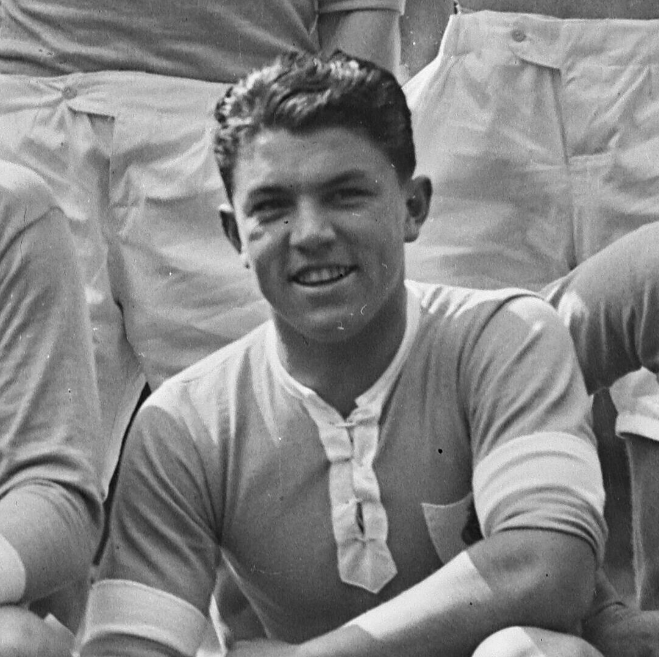
Rousié before the match against Germany in 1931.

=== Rugby League ===
In June 1934 (3 months after Galia's Boys tour in England), CAV XV switches codes from union to league (SAV.13) and in September 1934, he was appointed captain of the first tour of a French club beyond the Channel: SAV 13.

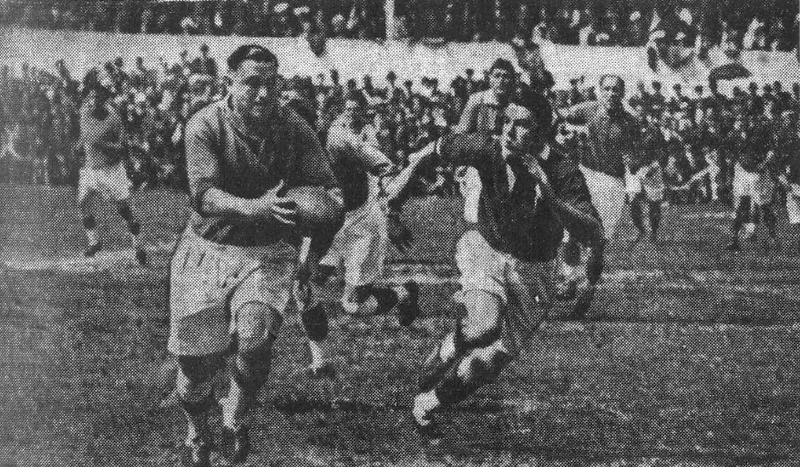
Finale of the Lord Derby Cup in 1938 between Roanne and Villeneuve, Étienne Cougnenc carries the ball while chased by Max Rousié.

During the 1937–38 Kangaroo tour Rousié captained France against the dominant visiting Australian side, playing at five-eighth in the first test match and at centre in the second, kicking one goal.

== World War II ==
He was engaged in war as a gunner and was awarded the Croix de Guerre, later, once he was demobilized, he could not resume playing rugby league due to its prohibition by the Vichy Regime. He then played three seasons for Nice, competing in the Coupe de France in 1942 with the Provence Litoral representative team before ending his sporting career. Although he was sought by many clubs, he rejected the offers and made some training time for Paris XIII and Mazamet.

== Post-playing career ==
Later, he worked in the oil site at Hassi-Messaoud in Algeria as well as physical education instructor and died due to a road accident on 2 June 1959 after commemorating with fellow former rugby league players the 25th anniversary of the birth of the sport in France. In his memory, the French rugby league federation, since 1960, named the trophy of the French Championship as "Bouclier Max-Rousié" ("The Max Rousié Shield").

== Biography ==
Born on 14 July 1912 in Marmande, his father, Jean-Louis Rousié, was a butcher in Villeneuve-sur-Lot and his mother was named Gabrielle Buchereau. He was 1,78 m high and weighed 83 kg.

== Legacy ==
Max Rousié has been honoured by the following:

- In 1988 he was inducted into the International Rugby League Hall of Fame.
- The Max Rousié Shield is awarded to the winner of the French Rugby League Championship.
- Paris' Stade Max Rousié and Centre Sportif Max Rousié are named in his honour.
- in Villeneuve-sur-Lot the avenue leading to the Stade de la Myre Mory carries his name.

== Honours ==
Rugby union:

- International (4 selections) in team of France (1931 to 1934).

Rugby league:

- Champion of France with the SAV.13 (1935) (1st championship),
- Winner of the Coupe de France with the Roanne rugby league club (1938),
- Champion of France with the Roanne rugby league club (1939),
- Captain of the French team that won the 1938–39 European Rugby League Championship
