= Robert Samatan =

French dual-code international rugby footballer

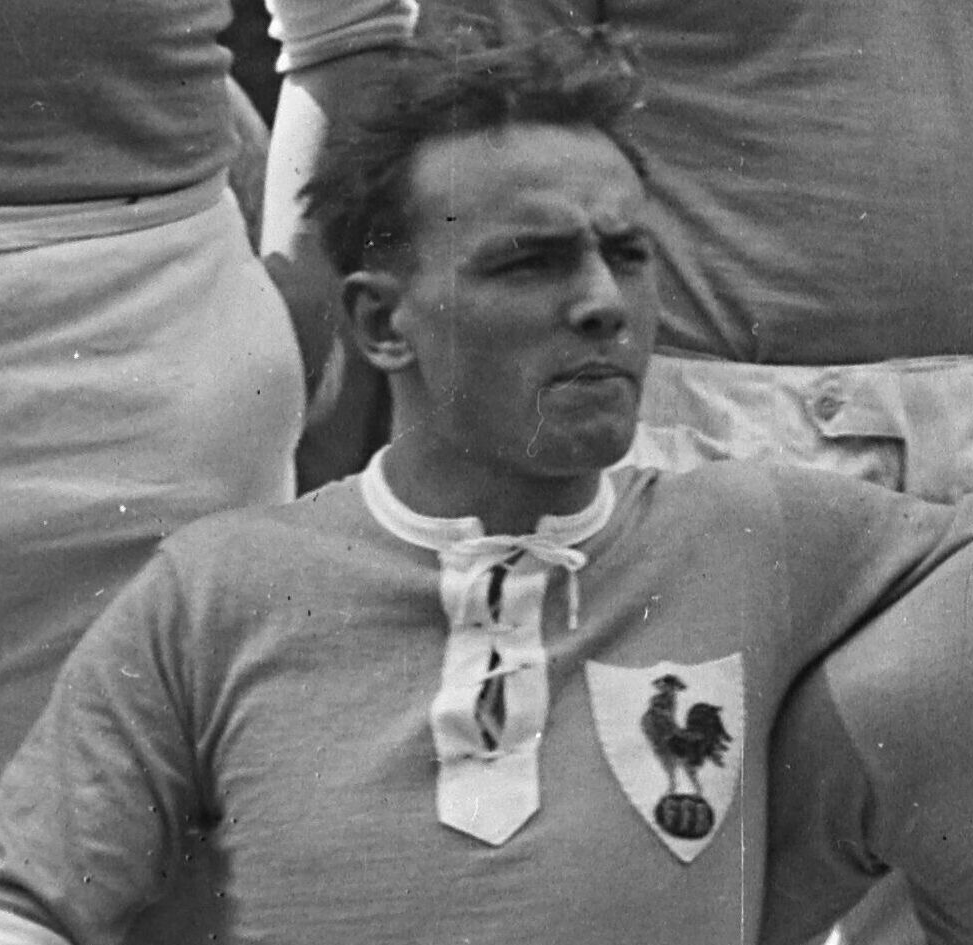
- Samatan before the match against Germany in 1931.

Personal information
- Full name: Robert Urban Jean Samatan
- Born: 16 April 1909 Toulouse, France
- Died: 4 May 1986 (aged 77) Antibes, France

Playing information
- Height: 5 ft 10 in (1.78 m)
- Weight: 76 kg (12 st 0 lb)

Rugby union
- Position: Wing
Club
Years	Team	Pld	T	G	FG	P
1930–31	Agen
Representative
Years	Team	Pld	T	G	FG	P
1930–31	France	10				6

Rugby league
- Position: wing
Club
Years	Team	Pld	T	G	FG	P
1934–??	Lyon
	RC Roanne XIII	6
	Total	6	0	0	0	0
Representative
Years	Team	Pld	T	G	FG	P
1934–37	France					12

Coaching information
Representative
Years	Team	Gms	W	D	L	W%
1951–54	France
- As of 16 January 2021

Robert Samatan, nicknamed Bob la Science (Toulouse, 16 April 1909 - Antibes, 4 May 1986) was a French rugby union and rugby league footballer.

He debuted for T.O.E.C (rugby union), 1.78m tall and weighing 76 kg at his debut, later he played at left wing for SU Agen (but also as right wing or number eight).

He is the forerunner of the modern wingers' playing style. The first player to be inspired by his lively and alert technique was Jean Dauger, who played for Bayonne.

In March 1934, he was dismissed from SU Agen, and was part of the rugby league team of the "Galia's Boys" who made a memorable tour in England under the management and captainship of its creator Jean Galia. His status as a Pioneer (Galia's Boy) did not qualify him as a French International.

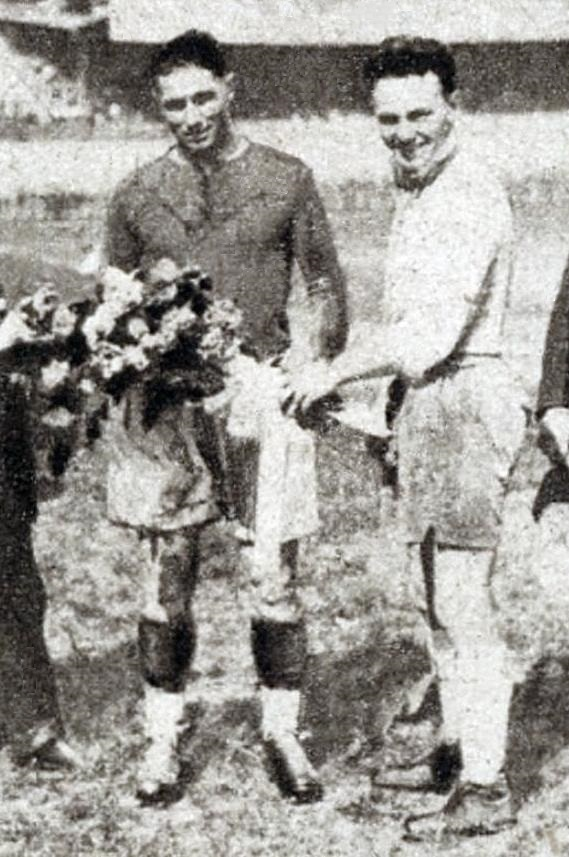
Eugène Ribère (Quillan) et Robert Samatan (Agen), during the kick-off of the 1931 match in Bordeaux.

Opting for rugby league, he integrated the Roanne XIII squad where Max Rousié and Jean Dauger played alongside him in 1938.

In 1951, he led the first French tour of a team sport (e.g. France national rugby league team) in Australia and New Zealand.

In his civil life, he worked as wholesaler in the food sector.

== Biography ==
In March 1934, Robert Samatan made an interview for L'Auto after switching to rugby league where he denounced the hypocrisy and the 'shamateurism' within the French Rugby Federation since several years. Playing then at the Toulouse Lyceum, he received an offer from Annibert (of Stade Toulousain, who later became a member of the French Athletics Federation where he dictated the laws of the full amateurism). Annibert promised him a success at his exams and numerous advantages and Mr. Furst of Stade Toulousain also proposed him 200 francs per month, which convinced Samatan to sign. After some months, his salary quadrupled and numerous clubs offered him a better salary like Quillan and Carcassonne, but it is finally Agen through Mr. Armand Bastoul's intermediary which obtained his signature for 25.000 francs and a situation, which later convinced Maurice Porra to join him at Agen for 1.500 francs per month. He decided to take part of the creation of a French rugby league team with Jean Galia. Appointed by the latter to convince some players to switch to rugby league, he faced overbids from rugby union clubs which were yet amateur in principle, such as USA Perpignan.

== Rugby union career ==
- Champion of France (as winger) with SU Agen (1930)
- International (10 caps) for France A (1930 -1931)

== Rugby league career ==
- Team honours :
  - Winner of the French Championship : 1939 (Roanne). (Note: Robert Samatan did not take part at the final.)
  - Winner of the Lord Derby Cup : 1935 (Lyon-Villeurbanne) et 1938 (Roanne).
- Individual honours :
  - International in four occasions for France between 1934 and 1936.
  - Co-trainer of France (being the first French team of a team sport (France national rugby league team) who made in 1951 a tour (successful and of 2,5 months) in Oceania) (1951-1955).

=== International Caps ===
Robert Samatan international matches
	Date	Venue	Opponent	Result	Competition	Position	Points	Tries	Pen.	Drops
1.	15 April 1934	Stade Buffalo, Paris, France	England	21-32	?	Wing	?	?	?	?
2.	1 January 1935	Bordeaux, France	Wales	18-11	?	Wing	?	?	?	?
3.	28 March 1935	Stade Buffalo, Paris, France	England	15-15	?	Wing	?	?	?	?
4.	6 December 1936	Paris, France	Wales	3-9	?	Five-eights	?	?	?	?
