= RC Roanne XIII =

French rugby league club

Club information
- Full name: Racing Club de Roanne XIII
- Colours: Blue and white
- Founded: 1934; 92 years ago
- Website: Official website

Current details
- Ground: Parc des Sports, Roanne

Racing Club de Roanne XIII, commonly known as RC Roanne, is a French rugby league club founded in 1934 and based in Roanne, in the Loire department. One of the first French rugby league clubs, Roanne competed in the inaugural French championship in the 1934–35 season.

Led by industrialist and sports administrator Claudius Devernois, Roanne won four French championships, in 1939, 1947, 1948 and 1960, and two Lord Derby Cup titles, in 1938 and 1962. Its coaches included Charles Petit, Jean Duhau, René Arotça, Robert Samatan and René Duffort. Among the French internationals who played for the club were Max Rousié, Jean Dauger, Joseph Crespo, Élie Brousse, Jean Barthe, Aldo Quaglio and Joseph Giné.

In 1949, Devernois moved to US Lyon-Villeurbanne, taking several Roanne players and coach Robert Samatan with him. He returned as Roanne's president in 1957 and recruited former rugby union internationals Jean Barthe, Aldo Quaglio and Claude Mantoulan in 1959. The club won its fourth French championship in 1960 and the Lord Derby Cup in 1962, before gradually declining.

RC Roanne remains listed by the Auvergne-Rhône-Alpes Rugby League but has no identified senior team competing in the 2026–27 national championships.

== History ==
Racing Club de Roanne XIII were one of the pioneering ten clubs in France that switched from rugby union to rugby league in 1934. Under wily manager Claude Devernois, and with stars like Max Rousié, Robert Samatan and Jean Dauger, they became one of the dominant forces in the early years of the sport in France, winning the Lord Derby Cup in 1938 and the Championship in 1939. They won the league on a further three occasions and the cup once more before financial trouble resulted in the club losing their place in the top level of French Rugby League.

== Club honours ==
- French Rugby League Championship
  - Winners – 1939, 1947, 1948, 1960
  - Runners Up - 1961
- Tier Two
  - Winners – 1986
  - Runners Up – 1984
- Lord Derby Cup
  - Winners – 1938, 1962

== Famous players ==
- Jean Barthe (22 International Appearances)
- Élie Brousse (31 International Appearances)
- Jean Dauger (7 International Appearances)
- Claude Mantoulan (46 International Appearances)
- Aldo Quaglio (17 International Appearances)
- Max Rousié (14 International Appearances)
- Robert Samatan (4 International Appearances)
- Ken Wolffe (1 international appearance)
- Henri Riu
- Joseph Crespo

== Sources ==
- Passamar, André (1984). L'Encyclopédie de Treize Magazine [The Encyclopedia of Treize Magazine] (in French). Toulouse: Treize Magazine. OCLC 461737232.
