= André Camel =

- Born: 9 January 1905 Toulouse, France
- Died: 1 March 1980 (aged 75) Toulouse, France
- Height: 6 ft 0 in (183 cm)
- Weight: 188 lb (85 kg)

Rugby union career
- Position: Lock
International career
Years	Team	Apps	(Points)
1928–35	France	16	(6)

André Camel (9 January 1905 – 1 March 1980) was a French international rugby union player.

A native of Toulouse, Camel was a lock forward with both Stade Toulousain and SC Angoulême. He gained 16 caps for France from 1928 to 1935. Most notably, Camel was a member of the first French side to defeat Wales, but his role in the 1928 match was limited as he broke his collarbone in the early stages. His brother Marcel was also capped for France.

Camel died while watching France's 1980 Five Nations match against Ireland on television.

== See also ==
- List of France national rugby union players
