= Marcel Baillette =

France international rugby union player

- Born: 12 October 1904 Perpignan, France
- Died: 30 April 1987 (aged 82) Toulon, France
- Height: 5 ft 8 in (173 cm)
- Weight: 168 lb (76 kg)

Rugby union career
- Position: Three–quarter
International career
Years	Team	Apps	(Points)
1925–32	France	17	(13)

Marcel Baillette (12 October 1904 – 30 April 1987) was a French international rugby union player.

Born in Perpignan, Baillette was a three–quarter and started his career with US Perpignan, from there that he gained his maiden international call up in 1925. He was capped a total of 17 times for France over a seven year span. After a stint with US Quillan, Baillette moved to RC Toulon in 1930–31 as captain and led the club to a first ever Brennus Shield title his first season. He was still playing for RC Toulon at the age of 40.

Baillette was a trader by profession.

== See also ==
- List of France national rugby union players
