= Eugène Ribère =

France international rugby union player

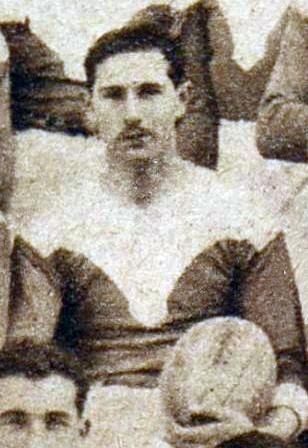
- Born: 14 June 1902 Thuir, France
- Died: 22 March 1988 (aged 85) Bordeaux, France
- Height: 5 ft 11 in (180 cm)
- Weight: 181 lb (82 kg)

Rugby union career
- Position: Wing-forward
International career
Years	Team	Apps	(Points)
1924–33	France	34	(27)

Eugène Ribère (14 June 1902 – 22 March 1988) was a French international rugby union player.

== Biography ==
Ribère hailed from Thuir in the Catalan region of France.

A wing-forward, Ribère played for US Thuir, US Perpignan and US Quillan. He was a member of the French squad for the 1924 Summer Olympics and was capped 34 times for France, which included 12 matches as captain.

Ribère's hometown club US Thuir named their stadium after him.

== See also ==
- List of France national rugby union players
