= US Quillan =

French rugby union club

Union Sportive Quillan Haute-Vallée or US Quillan is a French rugby union club based in Quillan. The team are currently playing in the Fédérale 2 competition, the 6th division of French rugby. They have in the past, made it to the final of the French championship, winning it in 1929. The team was founded in 1898.

== Honours ==
- French championship Top 14
  - Champions (1): 1929
  - Runners-up (2): 1928, 1930

== Finals results ==
=== French championship ===
Date	Winners	Score	Runners-up	Venue	Spectators
6 May 1928	Section Paloise	6-4	US Quillan	Stade des Ponts Jumeaux, Toulouse	20,000
19 May 1929	US Quillan	11-8	FC Lézignan	Stade des Ponts Jumeaux, Toulouse	20,000
18 May 1930	SU Agen	4-0	US Quillan	Parc Lescure, Bordeaux	28,000

== Notable players ==
- Marcel Baillette
- René Biénès
- Charles Bigot
- Amédée Cutzach
- Joseph Desclaux
- Louis Destarac
- Jean Galia
- Eugène Ribère
- Jean-Claude Rouan
- Marcel Soler
- Henri Pidoux
- Thierry Février
