= Elite One Championship V Grand Final =

The Elite One Championship V Grand Final was the last match to complete the Elite One Championship V season and to crown the 2008 champions. The final was contested by Lézignan Sangliers, who had finished first in the league table and had beaten Limoux Grizzlies to reach the final, and Pia Donkeys who had finished second in the league table and had beaten Carcassonne to reach the final. The final was held at the Stade de la Méditerranée in Béziers on 17 May 2008.

== Scorecard ==
May 17, 2008

Lézignan Sangliers	26–16	Pia Donkeys
Try: Jared Taylor (2); Franck Rovira; Gregory Mazard; Goal: James Wynne (2); Nicolas Munoz (3)		Try: Nicolas Piquemal; Sebastien Martins; Dean Bosnich; Goal: Maxime Grésèque (2)

Stade de la Méditerranée, Béziers
Attendance: 8233
Referee: M.Drizza

== Summary ==
=== First half ===
Lézignan Sangliers won the match 26-16 after being 12-6 up at half-time, to win the championship for the first time in their history. However it was Pia who scored first with Maxime Grésèque kicking a penalty after 5 minutes for Pia to lead by two points. They further extended this lead with a try from Nicolas Piquemal, although the conversion was unsuccessful. In the 15th minute Australian halfback James Wynne kicked a penalty and also successfully kicked the conversion to Jared Taylor's try seven minutes later. Jared Taylor, who was top try scorer in the league, then scored another try to propel Lezignan to a 12–6 lead going into half time, despite Pia having been ahead 0–6.

=== Second half ===
Just after half time saw Lezignan's Manu Bansept pick up the only yellow card of the match, and the third for him that season. Within a minute Pia had levelled the score with Sebastien Martins, playing just his sixth match in 2008. Maxime Grésèque kicked the two points but was unable to do so in the 56th minute which saw Dean Bosnich score his eighth try of the season. This meant that Pia held a narrow four-point lead. However Lezignan proved once again why they finished top of the league, scoring two tries in the 64th and 69th minute from Frenchmen Franck Rovira and Gregory Mazard respectively. Nicolas Munoz, who finished top conversion scorer for the season, kicked both conversions successfully. With one minute to go he then kicked a penalty for Lezignan to seal the victory.

== Teams ==
LÉZIGNAN SANGLIERS Taylor Mazzard Mullane Bringuier Janzac Cologni Wynne Brown Bansept Roméro Beattie Lacans Rovira Tribillac Aussaguel Munoz Laurent	PIA DONKEYS West Piquemal Franze Djalout Muniesa Greseque Sant Bosnich Knecht Pradal Kennedy Traversa Martins Cala Leger Garrabe Carrere

== Facts ==
- This had been the third time that Lezignan had beaten Pia in the season, winning 22–4 in Round 9 and narrowly winning 26–30 in Pia in Round 20.
- The 2007 Grand Final featured the same two teams however it was Pia who beat Lezignan 20–16.
- Despite winning three French Championships in 1960, 1962 and 1977, this was the first time that Lezignan won the Elite Championship, the competition having replaced the French Championship in 2003.
- The teams were made up of 24 Frenchmen, 9 Australians and 1 New Zealander.
- Lezignan's Chris Beattie was the eldest on the field at 32 years old.
- Two players, Lezignan's Chris Beattie and Pia's Paul Franze have had experience with Australian National Rugby League clubs, Sydney Roosters and Newcastle Knights respectively. Beattie had also played in the State of Origin. Pia's Maxime Grésèque has had experience with Super League team Wakefield Trinity Wildcats.
