= Maxime Garcia =

Italian international rugby league footballer (born 1998)

Personal information
- Born: 15 January 1998 (age 27)
- Height: 6 ft 1 in (1.86 m)
- Weight: 15 st 6 lb (98 kg)

Playing information
- Position: Loose forward, Prop
Club
Years	Team	Pld	T	G	FG	P
2017–18	Palau Broncos	3	0	0	0	0
2018–18	Sheffield Eagles	16	0	0	0	0
2018(loan)–18	→ Hemel Stags	2	0	0	0	0
2018–20	Racing Club Albi XIII	30	1	0	0	4
2020–-	Toulouse Olympique Broncos	15	0	0	0	0
2021–-	Toulouse Olympique	4	0	0	0	0
	Total	70	1	0	0	4
Representative
Years	Team	Pld	T	G	FG	P
2019–-	Spain	2	0	0	0	0
- Source: As of 18 November 2021

Maxime Garcia is a Spanish international rugby league player with Toulouse Olympique in Super League and Elite 1. He plays Loose forward or Prop. He has previously played for Palau Broncos and Sheffield Eagles where he also played on dual-registration with Hemel Stags. He then moved on to Racing Club Albi XIII and joined Toulouse in 2020.

== Background ==
Garcia's father was a rugby union fan and Maxime first played the sport at the age of nine. However when he went to Notre-Dame des Anges college, in Espira de l'Agly, he discovered rugby league through a teacher, Sébastien Munoz, who was previously employed with the Catalans Dragons and at the age of 16 he joined their U19s squad where he remained for three years.

== Club career ==
=== Palau Broncos ===
Garcia made three appearances for Palau in Elite 1 in December 2017.

=== Sheffield Eagles ===
Garcia made his debut for Sheffield in France, in the 50-6 Round 3 defeat to Toulouse Olympique on 17 February 2018. He was not selected for the Round 4 defeat at Featherstone, but returned for the Round 5 home defeat to London Broncos. He next appeared in Round 8 in Sheffield's first victory of the season, 38-20 against Rochdale. Garcia retained his place on the bench for the Round 9 defeat to Batley, the Round 10 victory at Swinton Lions which Sheffield won 19-18, and the 72-20 defeat to Leigh in Round 11. He missed out on the Round 12 win at Rochdale Hornets but returned the next round for the defeat at home to Halifax and the Round 14 defeat at London. He missed out on the Summer Bash win against Barrow Raiders. He also missed the defeats to Swinton and Batley, as he was on dual-registration at Hemel Stags. He resumed his place on the interchange bench for the Round 18 home defeat (6-40) to Featherstone Rovers, the 24-46 defeat to Toulouse Olympique and the 68-4 defeat at Toronto Wolfpack. Garcia missed out on the Round 21, 30-28 victory over Dewsbury Rams, but returned the following week for the 28-10 home win over Barrow Raiders and the final match of the season, a 34-10 defeat at Leigh Centurions which saw Sheffield finish the regular season in eighth spot and therefore progress to the Championship Shield.

In the 2018 Championship Shield, Sheffield played seven games. Garcia played in the Round 1 defeat at Leigh, the Round 5 defeat (44-4) at Batley and the 24-22 home defeat to Barrow in Round 6. All sixteen matches saw Garcia enter the field of play from the interchange bench.

Garcia did not feature in Sheffield's 2018 Challenge Cup fourth round defeat at Barrow

=== Hemel Stags ===
In May 2018 Hemel signed a dual-registration agreement with Sheffield Eagles. Under the agreement, Garcia made two appearances for Hemel. He played in the League 1 Round 12 victory at West Wales Raiders on 9 June and the following week in the 56-8 home defeat to Newcastle Thunder.

=== Racing Club Albi XIII ===
Éric Anselme signed Garcia to Albi, where he spent two years, the second as captain. On leaving Albi, Garcia stated that the move to Toulouse was driven by his desire to get out of his comfort zone and test himself further.

=== Toulouse Olympique Broncos ===
On 6 June 2020, Toulouse announced that Garcia had joined the club from Albi for the 2020/21 Elite 1 season.

=== Toulouse Olympique ===
Garcia joined the first team squad for the opening fixture of the 2021 campaign at York on 3 April, but was not selected to play. Garcia remained with the professional squad and made his debut, coming off the bench in the next fixture on 25 April, a 44-34 victory at Halifax Panthers. Garcia remained in the side, playing in the next match, a 70-0 home win against Widnes Vikings played at Heywood Road, the home of Swinton Lions. He wasn't selected for the next match on 16 May, a 66-0 win at Whitehaven, but did play in the next two matches, a 56-12 win at Dewsbury Rams on 13 June, and a 54-6 defeat of Sheffield Eagles played at Belle Vue (Wakefield). He did not feature again in 2021.

== Club statistics ==
Source Updated 18 November 2021.

Year	Club	Competition	Appearances	Tries	Goals	Drop goals	Points
2017-18	Palau Broncos	Elite One Championship	3	0	0	0	0
2018	Sheffield Eagles	Championship	16	0	0	0	0
2018	Hemel Stags	League 1	2	0	0	0	0
2018-19	Racing Club Albi XIII	Elite One Championship	18	0	0	0	0
2019-20	Racing Club Albi XIII	Elite One Championship	12	1	0	0	4
2020-21	Toulouse Olympique Broncos	Elite One Championship	15	0	0	0	0
2021	Toulouse Olympique	Championship	4	0	0	0	0
Club career total			70	1	0	0	4

== International career ==
=== France U18s ===
Garcia started on the bench in the 52–20 defeat to England Academy at Warrington on 27 May 2016.

=== Spain ===
His international debut came in Xàtiva on 26 October 2019 against Ireland in a 2021 Rugby League World Cup qualifier which Spain lost 42-8. His second cap came a week later in Lignano Sabbiadoro in the 34-4 defeat to Italy, which ended Spain's 2021 world cup hopes.

== International statistics ==
Year	Team	Competition	Appearances	Tries	Goals	Drop goals	Points
2019	Spain	2021 Rugby League World Cup	2	0	0	0	0
International career total			2	0	0	0	0
