= Elite One Championship 2018–2019 =

French rugby league competition

Elite One Championship 2018–19
- League: Elite One Championship
- Duration: 19 rounds
- Teams: 10
- Broadcast partners: (France) beIN Sports (France) Radio Marseillette

2018–19 season
- Champions: Saint-Estève Catalan; 2nd Elite One title
- League leaders: AS Carcassonne
- Biggest home win: AS Carcassonne 50 – 4 Toulouse Olympique Broncos (22 April 2019)
- Biggest away win: Albi RL 54 – 10 Toulouse Olympique Broncos (26 May 2019)
- Top point-scorer(s): (France) Aurelien Decarnin 154
- Top try-scorer(s): (Spain) Romain Franco 24

The 2018–19 Elite One Championship was the 84th season of France's domestic rugby league competition and 17th known as the Elite One Championship. Ten teams competed in the regular season playing 19 matches each from November 2018 to June 2019, with the top six teams playing a three-week finals series throughout June 2019.

Saint-Estève XIII Catalan won their second Elite One Championship beating minor premiers AS Carcassonne in the final 32–24 after finishing 2nd in the regular season.

== Teams ==
Location of teams in 2018–19 season

Elite One Championship
| Team | Stadium | Location |
|---|---|---|
| Albi RL | Stadium Mazicou | Albi, Tarn |
| SO Avignon | Parc des Sports (Avignon) | Avignon, Vaucluse |
| AS Carcassonne | Stade Albert Domec | Carcassonne, Aude |
| FC Lézignan | Stade du Moulin | Lézignan-Corbières, Aude |
| Limoux Grizzlies | Stade de l'Aiguille | Limoux, Aude |
| Palau XIII Broncos | Stade Georges Vaills | Palau-del-Vidre, Pyrénées-Orientales |
| Saint-Estève Catalan | Stade Municipal | Perpignan, Pyrénées-Orientales |
| Saint-Gaudens Bears | Stade Jules Ribet | Saint-Gaudens, Haute-Garonne |
| Toulouse Olympique Broncos | Stade des Minimes | Toulouse, Haute-Garonne |
| Villeneuve Leopards | Stade Max Rousie | Villeneuve-sur-Lot, Lot-et-Garonne |

== Format ==
=== Regular season ===
Each team was scheduled to every other team twice, once at home and the other away. Each team then played another team again during Magic Weekend that was held on Saturday, April 13 and Sunday, April 14, 2019, in Carcassonne, to make a total of 19 regular season matches for each team.

=== Finals series ===
At the end of the regular season, the top six of the regular season advance to the knockout stage. 1st and second receive a bye for the first week of finals as third plays sixth (Qualifying Final 1) and fourth plays fifth (Qualifying Final 2), with the losers of both matches eliminated. First then plays the winner of Qualifying final 1 and second then plays the winner of Qualifying Final 2. The winners of these two matches play in Grand Final on 29 June at Stadium Municipal d'Albi in Albi.

== Regular season ==
=== Home and Away ===
| Home \ Away | ALB | AVI | CAR | LÉZ | LIM | PAL | STE | STG | TOU | VIL |
|---|---|---|---|---|---|---|---|---|---|---|
| Albi | | 47–4 | 36–24 | 28–24 | 36–24 | 26–27 | 18–42 | 26–10 | 8–34 | 30–16 |
| Avignon | 22–34 | | 26–22 | 10–36 | 28–32 | 12–24 | 16–54 | 40–18 | 22–16 | 12–20 |
| Carcassonne | 22–8 | 16–19 | | 34–26 | 19–18 | 20–0 | 18–20 | 44–24 | 50–4 | 30–16 |
| Lézignan | 10–20 | 28–20 | 29–22 | | 34–4 | 58–43 | 36–10 | 34–6 | 48–28 | 20–44 |
| Limoux | 26–16 | 48–10 | 14–31 | 22–16 | | 30–14 | 22–20 | 42–12 | 42–22 | 20–12 |
| Palau | 38–42 | 32–16 | 40–46 | 4–42 | 16–20 | | 24–32 | 14–24 | 30–36 | 16–20 |
| Saint-Estève Catalan | 42–24 | 56–22 | 12–36 | 24–30 | 46–18 | 36–24 | | 24–20 | 38–30 | 34–22 |
| Saint-Gaudens | 18–48 | 38–14 | 10–40 | 26–24 | 26–36 | 24–44 | 26–28 | | 20–16 | 20–22 |
| Toulouse | 10–54 | 6–30 | 22–60 | 20–50 | 12–56 | 35–26 | 10–50 | 46–10 | | 26–48 |
| Villeneuve | 40–8 | 20–10 | 18–24 | 30–14 | 12–24 | 40–34 | 14–18 | 24–32 | 30–18 | |

Legend: Blue = home team win; Yellow = draw; Red = away team win.

=== Magic Weekend ===
Magic Weekend was held on Saturday, April 13 and Sunday, April 14, 2019, with all matches being played in Carcassonne. All match winners would be awarded 4 points instead of the regular 3.

| Date | Team 1 | Score | Team 2 |
|---|---|---|---|
| 13 April 18:00 | Palau | 42–24 | Saint-Gaudens |
| 13 April 18:00 | Lézignan | 18–14 | Limoux |
| 13 April 18:00 | Toulouse | 30–31 | Avignon |
| 14 April 15:00 | Villeneuve | 24–52 | Albi |
| 13 April 18:00 | Saint-Estève Catalan | 22–30 | Carcassonne |

=== Table ===
2018-19 Elite One Championship
| Pos | Team | Pld | W | D | L | GF | GA | GD | BP | Pts | Qualification |
|---|---|---|---|---|---|---|---|---|---|---|---|
| 1 | Carcassonne | 19 | 14 | 0 | 5 | 588 | 364 | +224 | 6 | 48 | Semi-Finals |
| 2 | Saint-Estève XIII Catalan (C) | 19 | 14 | 0 | 5 | 608 | 440 | +168 | 3 | 45 | Semi-Finals |
| 3 | Lézignan | 19 | 12 | 0 | 7 | 577 | 409 | +168 | 6 | 42 | Qualifying-Finals |
| 4 | Limoux Grizzlies | 19 | 13 | 0 | 6 | 512 | 400 | +112 | 3 | 42 | Qualifying-Finals |
| 5 | Albi RL | 19 | 12 | 0 | 7 | 561 | 457 | +104 | 3 | 39 | Qualifying-Finals |
| 6 | Villeneuve Leopards | 19 | 10 | 0 | 9 | 472 | 442 | +30 | 6 | 36 | Qualifying-Finals |
| 7 | Palau XIII Broncos | 19 | 5 | 0 | 14 | 492 | 583 | −91 | 11 | 26 | |
| 8 | SO Avignon | 19 | 6 | 0 | 13 | 365 | 577 | −212 | 7 | 25 | |
| 9 | Saint-Gaudens Bears | 19 | 5 | 0 | 14 | 388 | 608 | −220 | 4 | 19 | |
| 10 | Toulouse Olympique Broncos | 19 | 4 | 0 | 15 | 421 | 704 | −283 | 5 | 17 | |

Rules for classification: 3 points for a victory; 4 points for a victory in Magic Weekend; 1 point bonus for losing team if the margin is less than 12. If two teams have equal points then the separation factor is point difference. If a team has a greater point difference they rank higher on the table.
(C) Champions

== Finals series ==
Qualifying Finals
Stade de l'Aiguille, Limoux
4 | Limoux | 26
5 | Albi | 24
Stade du Moulin, Lézignan
3 | Lézignan | 35
6 | Villeneuve | 20

Semi-Finals
Stade Albert-Domec, Carcassonne
1 | Carcassonne | 20
4 | Limoux | 16
Stade Municipal, Saint-Estève
2 | Saint-Estève Catalan | 38
3 | Lézignan | 18

Final
Stadium Municipal d'Albi, Albi
1 | Carcassonne | 24
2 | Saint-Estève Catalan | 32

=== Qualifying Finals ===
==== Limoux vs Albi ====
Sunday, 16 June, 2019
16:30

| Limoux Grizzlies | 26 – 24 | Albi RL |
|---|---|---|
| Tries: Thomas Lasvenes (5') 1 Maxime Péault (23') 1 Henry Noki (45') 1 Mathieu Mayans (54') 1 Mickaël Murcia (68') 1 Goals: Mickaël Murcia 2 (68' pen, 72'); Allan Torreilles 1 (45') | 1st: 8 – 12; 2nd: 18 – 12 | Tries: 2 (9', 68') Jye Ballinger; 1 (12') Nittim Pedrero; 1 (77') Cédric Mazars; Goals: 4 Baptiste Fabre (9', 12', 68', 77') |

Stade de l'Aiguille, Limoux
Referee: B. Casty and Vergnes

==== Lezignan vs Villeneuve ====
Sunday, 16 June, 2019
16:30

| FC Lézignan | 35 – 20 | Villeneuve Leopards |
|---|---|---|
| Tries: Cyril Stacul (33', 69') 2 Benjamin Tort (3') 1 Valentin Ferret (45') 1 Lilian Albert (39') 1 Maxime Benausse (73') 1 Goals: Damien Cardace 5 (19', 33', 39', 69', 73'); Field Goals: Amine Miloudi (79') 1 | 1st: 22 – 10; 2nd: 13 – 10 | Tries: 2 (22', 54') Maxence Carrasco; 1 (13') Loïc Marira; 1 (64') Dorian Brioux; Goals: 2 Aurelien Decarnin (13', 64') |

Stade du Moulin, Lézignan-Corbières
Referee: M. Drizza and K. Delarose

=== Semi-finals ===
==== Carcassonne vs Limoux ====
Saturday, 22 June, 2019
19:30

| Carcassonne | 20 – 16 (a.e.t) | Limoux Grizzlies |
|---|---|---|
| Tries: Bastien Canet (5') 1 Luc Franco (50') 1 Tony Tumusa (77') 1 Nabil Djalout (82') 1 Goals: Alexis Albérola 2 (5', 17' pen) | 1st: 8 – 6; 2nd: 8 – 10; ET: 4 – 0 | Tries: 1 (66') Thomas Lasvenes; Goals: 6 Mickaël Murcia (20' pen, 35' pen, 38' pen, 54' pen, 59' pen, 66') |

Stade Albert Domec, Carcassonne
Attendance: 800
Referee: B. Casty and M.Drizza

==== Catalan vs Lezignan ====
Sunday, 23 June, 2019
16:00

| Saint-Estève Catalan | 38 – 18 | FC Lézignan |
|---|---|---|
| Tries: Arthur Romano (9', 21') 2 Robin Brochon (17', 68') 2 Ben Pomeroy (29') 1 Romain Franco (56', 78') 2 Goals: Joan Guasch 5 (13' pen, 17', 43' pen, 68', 78' ) | 1st: 20 – 12; 2nd: 18 – 6 | Tries: 1 (3') Michaël Tribillac; 1 (36') Florian Bousquet; 1 (67') Amine Miloudi; Goals: 3 Damien Cardace (3', 36', 67') |

Stade Municipal, Perpignan
Attendance: 1400
Referee: K. Delarose and S. Vincent

== Final ==
=== Teams ===
| Carcassonne | Position | Saint Esteve Catalan |
|---|---|---|
| Tony Tumusa | Fullback | Robin Brochon |
| Alexis Escamilla | Wing | Romain Franco |
| Vincent Albert | Centre | Thomas Ambert |
| Jamie Anderson | Centre | Ben Pomeroy |
| Clement Soubeyras | Wing | Ugo Martin |
| Luc Franco | Five-eighth | Joan Guasch |
| Alexis Albérola | Halfback | Arthur Mourgue |
| Amar Sabri | Prop | Mathieu Cozza |
| Julien Agullo | Hooker | Alexis Meresta-Doucet |
| Bastien Canet | Prop | Arnaud Bartès |
| Jean-Philippe Baile (c) | 2nd Row | Paul Séguier |
| Nabil Djalout | 2nd Row | Ugo Perez |
| Matthieu Khedimi | Lock | Thibaud Margalet |
| Johnathon Soum | Reserve | Sébastien Bled |
| Damien Tétart | Reserve | Valentin Zafra |
| Geoffrey Zava | Reserve | Lambert Belmas |
| Florent Rouanet | Reserve | Hugo Salabio |
| Patrick Albérola | Coach | Benoît Albert |

=== Match Summary ===
Saturday, 29 June, 2019
20:00

| Carcassonne | 24 – 32 | Saint-Estève Catalan |
|---|---|---|
| Tries: Jamie Anderson (7') 1 Vincent Albert (15') 1 Luc Franco (27') 1 Alexis Escamilla (30') 1 Goals: Alexis Albérola 2 (15', 27', 30', 61' pen); Sin Bins: Julien Agullo (65'); Nabil Djalout (79') | 1st: 22 – 4; 2nd: 2 – 28 | Tries: 1 (25') Ben Pomeroy; 1 (41') Paul Seguier; 1 (42') Arthur Mourgue; 1 (50') Ugo Perez; 1 (68') Alexis Meresta-Doucet; Goals: 1 (41') Joan Guasch; 5 Robin Brochon (42', 50', 55' pen, 68', 73' pen); Sin Bins:(50') Arnaud Bartes (79') Hugo Salabio |

Stadium Municipal d'Albi, Albi
Attendance: 3000
Referee: K. Delarose and S. Vincent
