= Hugo Pezet =

French rugby league footballer

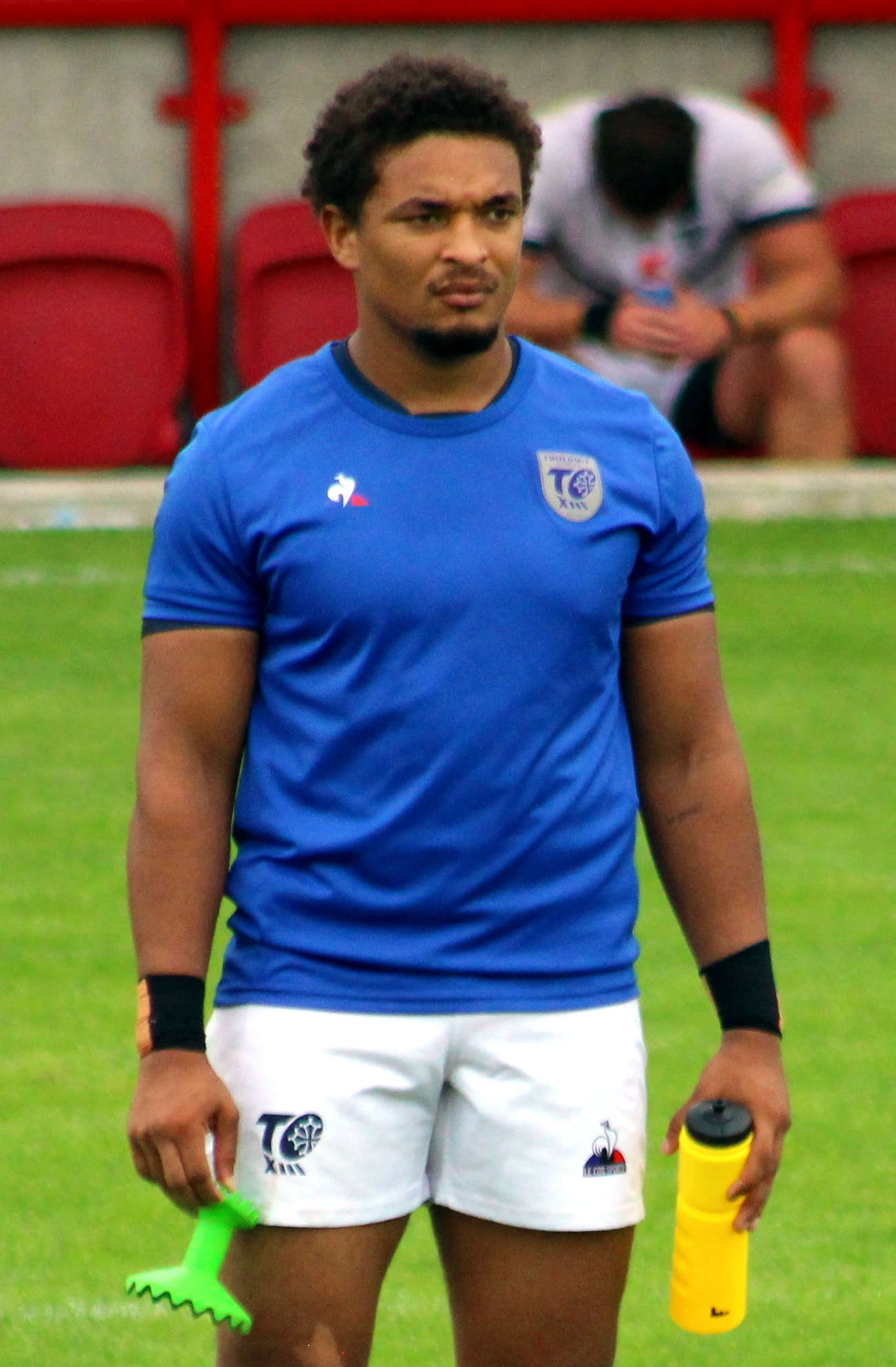

Personal information
- Born: 20 October 2000 (age 25) Albi, Tarn, Occitania, France
- Height: 5 ft 11 in (1.80 m)
- Weight: 14 st 7 lb (92 kg)

Playing information
- Position: Centre, Second-row
Club
Years	Team	Pld	T	G	FG	P
2018–21	Toulouse Olympique Broncos	34	4	0	0	16
2020–	Toulouse Olympique	4	2	0	0	8
	Total	38	6	0	0	24
- Source: As of 12 November 2021

Hugo Pezet (born 20 October 2000) is a French rugby league footballer who plays as a Centre or Second-row for Toulouse Olympique in the Championship.

He is a graduate of the Toulouse Olympique Academy system and signed his first professional contract for Toulouse in November 2021.

== Background ==
Pezet was born in France and discovered rugby league in his hometown of Albi.

== Club career ==
=== Early career ===
Pezet played in the junior ranks at Albi before joining the academy system at AS Carcassonne. He spent two years at Carcassonne before joining Toulouse in 2018.

=== Toulouse Olympique Broncos ===
Pezet made his debut playing at right centre in the 50–4 defeat at Carcassonne on 1 December 2018, the first day of Toulouse's 2018/19 Elite 1 season. and went on to play in 10 of Toulouse's 19 matches. In the 2019/20 season, Pezet played in 7 of 12 games in a shortened season cancelled due to COVID-19. His final game of the Elite 1 season was the 18–36 loss to Villeneuve before joining up with the first team for what turned out to be the final game of their aborted season. Pezet resumed playing rugby when the French Elite 1 season began (behind closed doors) on 1 November 2020. He played in 17 of the 18 games in 2020/21 season, before joining up with the first team once again.

=== Toulouse Olympique ===
Pezet made his debut for the Toulouse first team on 7 March 2020, scoring a try in the Round 5, 34–14 win against Batley at Stade Ernest Wallon. Due to COVID-19 the season was initially suspended after Round 5 and then subsequently cancelled with no more games being played.

Following the conclusion of the 2020/21 Elite 1 season in May, Pezet made three appearances for the first team in the 2021 RFL Championship coming off the bench each time. He scored a try away at Dewsbury Rams, and made further appearances at Wakefield against Sheffield Eagles and then away at Oldham.

On 5 November 2021 it was announced that he had signed his first professional contract and would be part of the Toulouse Olympique squad for their first ever Super League campaign in 2022. On 15 October 2023, Pezet played in Toulouse Olympique's upset loss in the Million Pound Game against the London Broncos.

== Club statistics ==
Year	Club	Competition	Appearances	Tries	Goals	Drop goals	Points
2018-19	Toulouse Olympique Broncos	Elite One Championship	10	1	0	0	4
2019-20	Toulouse Olympique Broncos	Elite One Championship	7	0	0	0	0
2020	Toulouse Olympique	Championship	1	1	0	0	4
2020-21	Toulouse Olympique Broncos	Elite One Championship	17	3	0	0	12
2021	Toulouse Olympique	Championship	3	1	0	0	4
Club career total			38	6	0	0	24

== International career ==
=== France U19s ===
Pezet was initially named in the France U19 squad for the 2018 U19s European Championships to be held in Serbia however he was replaced in the squad by Jayson Goffin and took no part in the tournament.

In July 2019, Pezet was named in a 35-man U19s train-on squad to play four games in New Zealand. Pezet made the reduced 24 man squad and toured New Zealand where France U19s played Canterbury U20s (won 32–28); Waikato U20s (won 28–18); New Zealand U18s (lost 44–26); and Auckland (lost 38–26)
