= Franck Maria =

French International rugby league footballer

Personal information
- Full name: Franck Maria
- Born: 31 July 1997 (age 29) Villeneuve-sur-Lot, France
- Height: 6 ft 3 in (1.90 m)
- Weight: 16 st 5 lb (104 kg)

Playing information
- Position: Prop, Loose forward
Club
Years	Team	Pld	T	G	FG	P
2016–19	Saint-Estève	25	9	0	0	36
2019–20	Villeneuve	3	0	0	0	0
2021–23	FC Lézignan	26	4	0	0	16
2023	Saint-Estève	19	2	0	0	8
2024–	Catalans Dragons	36	1	0	0	4
	Total	109	16	0	0	64
Representative
Years	Team	Pld	T	G	FG	P
2022–	France B	1	0	0	0	0
2023–	France	2	0	0	0	0
- Source: As of 30 August 2026
- Relatives: Antoni Maria (brother)

Franck Maria (born 31 July 1997) is a French rugby league footballer who plays as a prop or loose forward for the Catalans Dragons in the Betfred Super League and France at international level.

He has previously played for Saint-Estève XIII Catalan, Villeneuve and FC Lézignan in the Elite One Championship

== Background ==
Maria was born in Villeneuve-sur-Lot, France. He is the younger brother of former professional rugby league footballer Antoni Maria.

He graduated through the Catalans Dragons Academy system.

== Career ==
=== Club career ===
==== Saint-Estève XIII Catalan ====
Maria played for Saint-Estève XIII Catalan in the Elite One Championship between 2017 and 2019.

In 2018 he won the Lord Derby Cup when Saint-Estève beat the Limoux by 30–26 at the Stade Gilbert Brutus, Perpignan.

Maria was part of the team that won the Elite One Championship 2018–2019, but was not part of match day squad in their Grand Final victory over AS Carcassonne in June 2019.

==== Villeneuve ====
He played for Villeneuve in the 2019–2020 Elite One Championship before his spell at the club was cut short by Covid-19.

==== FC Lézignan ====
Maria played for FC Lézignan in the Elite One Championship between 2021 and 2023.

==== Saint-Estève XIII ====
In 2023 he returned to the Catalans Dragons feeder side Saint-Estève XIII Catalan, playing in the Super XIII whilst being part of their Super League setup.

Maria 2025 he won the Coupe de France Lord Derby when Saint-Estève XIII beat Racing Club Albi by 26–18 at the Parc des Sports et de l'Amitié, Narbonne.

==== Catalans Dragons ====
In March 2024 made his Super League debut the Catalans Dragons, coming off the bench in a home victory over the Castleford Tigers.

Maria was given a heavy ban following a red card against the Salford Red Devils in September 2025.

=== International career ===
Maria played for France B in October 2022, featuring in their 18–16 loss against the England Knights.

He made his full international debut for France in September 2023, coming off the bench in their 78–10 victory over Serbia. He earned his cap the following June, in a 40-8 loss against England.
