= Nabil Djalout =

France international rugby league footballer

Personal information
- Born: 28 March 1989 (age 37)
- Height: 5 ft 9 in (1.75 m)
- Weight: 14 st 7 lb (92 kg)

Playing information
- Position: Second-row
Club
Years	Team	Pld	T	G	FG	P
2007–08	Saint-Esteve	9	2	0	0	8
2008–12	SM Pia XIII	38	18	3	0	78
2012–13	Lézignan Sangliers	3	1	0	0	4
2013–14	Palau XIII Broncos	2	1	0	0	4
2015–17	Saint-Esteve	19	6	0	0	24
2017	Catalans Dragons	1	0	0	0	0
2018	Sheffield Eagles	6	0	0	0	0
2018	AS Carcassonne	5	3	0	0	12
2020–	Palau XIII Broncos
	Total	83	31	3	0	130
Representative
Years	Team	Pld	T	G	FG	P
2017	France	3	0	0	0	0
- Source: As of 11 January 2021

Nabil Djalout (born 28 March 1989) is a French international rugby league footballer who plays for Palau Broncos in the Elite One Championship as a second row.

== Background ==
Djalout is of French-Algerian heritage.

== Club career ==
=== Saint-Esteve ===
Djalout began his professional career with Elite One Championship side Union Treiziste Catalane (now Saint-Esteve), he played in nine games and managed two tries in his first spell with the club.

=== SM Pia XIII ===
Following his stint with Saint-Esteve, the second rower joined up with the SM Pia, also of the Elite One Championship. He spent four years with them from 2008 to 2012. In this spell he played 38 times and scored eighteen tries and kicked three goals. In his first season the club finished third in the division with 47 points collected. After this, they suffered back-to-back defeats in the play-offs. The following year the club finished fourth with 11 less points than before but were more successful in the play-off stages as they reached the final to be beaten by Lézignan Sangliers. During the 2010/11 season Pia picked up 50 points but again finished third in the league and lost in the Elimination Final stage of the play-offs. However, in his final season with the side they finally won the league with 46 total points. They again suffered a play-off Grand Final defeat by AS Carcassonne.

=== Lézignan Sangliers ===
Djalout then joined Lézignan Sangliers in 2012, but he only scored once in just three appearances.

=== Palau Broncos ===
After this spell with another Elite One Championship team he joined up with 2014 Grand Finalists Palau Broncos, but he played even less here making just two appearances.

=== Saint-Esteve (rejoin) ===
Having just played 5 times in two seasons and at two different clubs, Djalout rejoined his first club Saint-Esteve. From 2015 to 2017 he played much more frequently, making 19 apps in two seasons and racking up 6 tries. This new found good form attracted the attention of French Rugby league's best team the Catalans Dragons.

=== Catalans Dragons ===
In 2017 he made his Super League debut, and only game, for the Dragons against the Huddersfield Giants.

=== Sheffield Eagles ===
After having trials with newly promoted Super League side Hull K.R. and turning down a new deal with Catalans, Djalout signed for English Championship outfit the Sheffield Eagles. He made his début against the Dewsbury Rams and impressed as the Eagles went down 20 points to 18. However, during a game against the Rochdale Hornets Djalout suffered an injury that turned out to be a ruptured Achilles tendon and this ruled him out for the rest of the season.

On 29 Jan 2018 it was reported that he had signed for Sheffield Eagles in the RFL Championship

=== AS Carcassonne ===
At the end of the season, Djalout's contract was not renewed with the Eagles and he returned to France to play for AS Carcassonne.

=== International career ===
He featured for France in the 2017 Rugby League World Cup and played against England and Lebanon in the Group Stages.
