= René Benausse =

France international rugby league player (1929–2013)

Personal information
- Full name: René Lucien Antoine Benausse
- Born: 23 September 1929 Carcassonne, France
- Died: 29 November 2013 (aged 84) Villalier, France

Playing information
- Height: 5 ft 9 in (1.75 m)
- Weight: 12 st 9 lb (80 kg)
- Position: Wing
Club
Years	Team	Pld	T	G	FG	P
19??–??	AS Carcassonne
19??–??	FC Lézignan XIII
	Total	0	0	0	0	0
Representative
Years	Team	Pld	T	G	FG	P
1960–60	France	2	1	0	0	3
- Relatives: Patrice Benausse (nephew); Gilbert Benausse (brother)

René Benausse (born 23 September 1929 in Carcassonne – died 29 November 2013 in Villalier) was a French rugby league footballer who played in the 1960s. He played at the international level for France, and at club level for AS Carcassonne and FC Lézignan XIII playing at wing. He is the older brother of fellow rugby league footballer Gilbert Benausse, alongside which he played for Lézignan.

== Playing career ==
At club level, Benausse played first for AS Carcassonne, and then for FC Lézignan XIII. He was capped twice for France and took part at the 1960 Rugby League World Cup. Both of this international caps were two test matches against Great Britain.

== Personal life ==
René Benausse was the older brother of France Centre Gilbert Benausse, and uncle of FC Lézignan XIII and AS Carcassonne Fullback, and Wing of the 1990s and 2000s Patrice Benausse. Outside the pitch, he worked as an accountant.

== Honours ==
- French Rugby League Championship
  - French Champion :1952, 1953, 1955 (Carcassonne), 1961, and 1963 (Lézignan)
  - Runner-up in 1959 (Lézignan)
- Lord Derby Cup
  - Champion in 1952 (Carcassonne) and 1960 (Lézignan)
  - Runner-up in 1961 (Lézignan)
