= Val de Dagne =

Valley in Aude, France

Coordinates: 43.119°N 2.449°E

The Val de Dagne is a valley to the south east of Carcassonne in the department of Aude in southwest France. It forms a fiscal area of the Carcassonne arrondissement in Aude.

== Geography ==
The valley forms roughly a Z shape, the northern part following the line of the D3 immediately to the south of the Alaric Mountains, between Monze and Montlaur, and the southern part extending roughly from the slopes of the Corbières Massif in the west, to the entry of the gorge of the Sou River as it approaches its confluence with the Orbieu west of Lagrasse. However the precise extent of the area known as the Val de Dagne is more vague than this, and villages and hamlets beyond this main valley, particularly across its western watershed towards Limoux, are said to lie in the Val.

Approaching from the direction of Carcassonne the northern part of the valley spreads out from Monze, and includes the villages of Pradelles-en-Val and Montlaur. In the southern part of the valley there are seven villages and a small hamlet. The largest village is Serviès-en-Val, 3 km from the eastern end of the valley, with a village school, a rugby stadium and three small shops. Smaller villages and hamlets lie along the valley sides around Serviès; Villar-en-Val near the western head of the valley, Labastide-en-Val along the sides of a southern tributary valley, Villetritouls, Taurize and Rieux-en-Val on the southern valley edge, Arquettes-en-Val on the facing northern slope, and Villemagne, a wine producing hamlet near the entrance to the gorge, based on the site of a Roman villa. The hamlets of Fajac-en-Val on the plateau above Arquettes, and Molières-sur-l'Alberte on the plateau above Villar, are also described by some commentators as being in the Val de Dagne.

== Architecture ==
This is an area which for centuries has depended for its livelihood mainly upon viticulture, and has remained for the most part relatively poor. Villages and hamlets are of stone built houses, many of which, particularly on the main streets, incorporate the traditional large doorway to a chai - an area for wine production. The relative poverty of the valley is reflected in the appearance of many of its houses and other buildings.

Since just before the turn of the millennium there has been a considerable influx of foreign house buyers into the valley from a variety of countries. They have been mainly attracted by the low cost of older housing stock, much of which has been restored, either for permanent use or as occasionally used second homes.

The valley contains a number of interesting churches, although they are all little used. There is one in each village, and an additional one sits on a small hillock on the valley floor below Villetritouls. In the church at Fajac-en-Val there are wall paintings, recently produced by a local artist.

== Economy ==
Most of the local French work in the vineyards which provide grapes for the wine producing co-operatives at Montlaur and Monze, the one at Serviès having merged in 2006 with that at Fabrezan. In this respect life has hardly changed since the French Revolution, except for the introduction of farm machinery and other improvements which have been made possible by the EU's Common Agricultural Policy. The closure of the independent Serviès co-operative in 2006 coincided with the beginnings of a radical change in the appearance of the valley, as a large number of vineyards have been, and continue to be grubbed up to be replaced, mainly by cereal crops, most commonly barley and rye. The consequent reduction in the percentage of local land under vines, as well as altering the appearance of the landscape, will have a fundamental effect on the local economy. Economic change has been brought about by a combination of factors, mainly concerning a loss of wine markets, and time alone will tell how climatic change will exacerbate this change and how local farmers will attempt to cope with it. The declining state of local wine production, particularly that based on local co-operatives, has led to a change of policy by the Regional Authorities of Languedoc Roussillon, and a conscious attempt by them to encourage and develop tourism in the area. This is very largely in its infancy, although there is an increasing amount of accommodation available in, and particularly near the valley in nearby Carcassonne, Lagrasse, Lézignan-Corbières and Narbonne, and local hotels and restaurants are being encouraged to remain open throughout the year. However in the valley itself there are few of these, and only time will tell if there are any developments within the service sector to attract tourists in future years. In addition to the influx of non-French residents, some local houses provide second homes for French families, so that in most villages there is a tendency towards a falling percentage of permanent residents. This brings its own changes in terms of lowering levels of viability for schools, bars, shops, etc., and this is all part of the current economic transformation of the valley.
