= Arquettes-en-Val =

Commune in Occitanie, France

- Commune
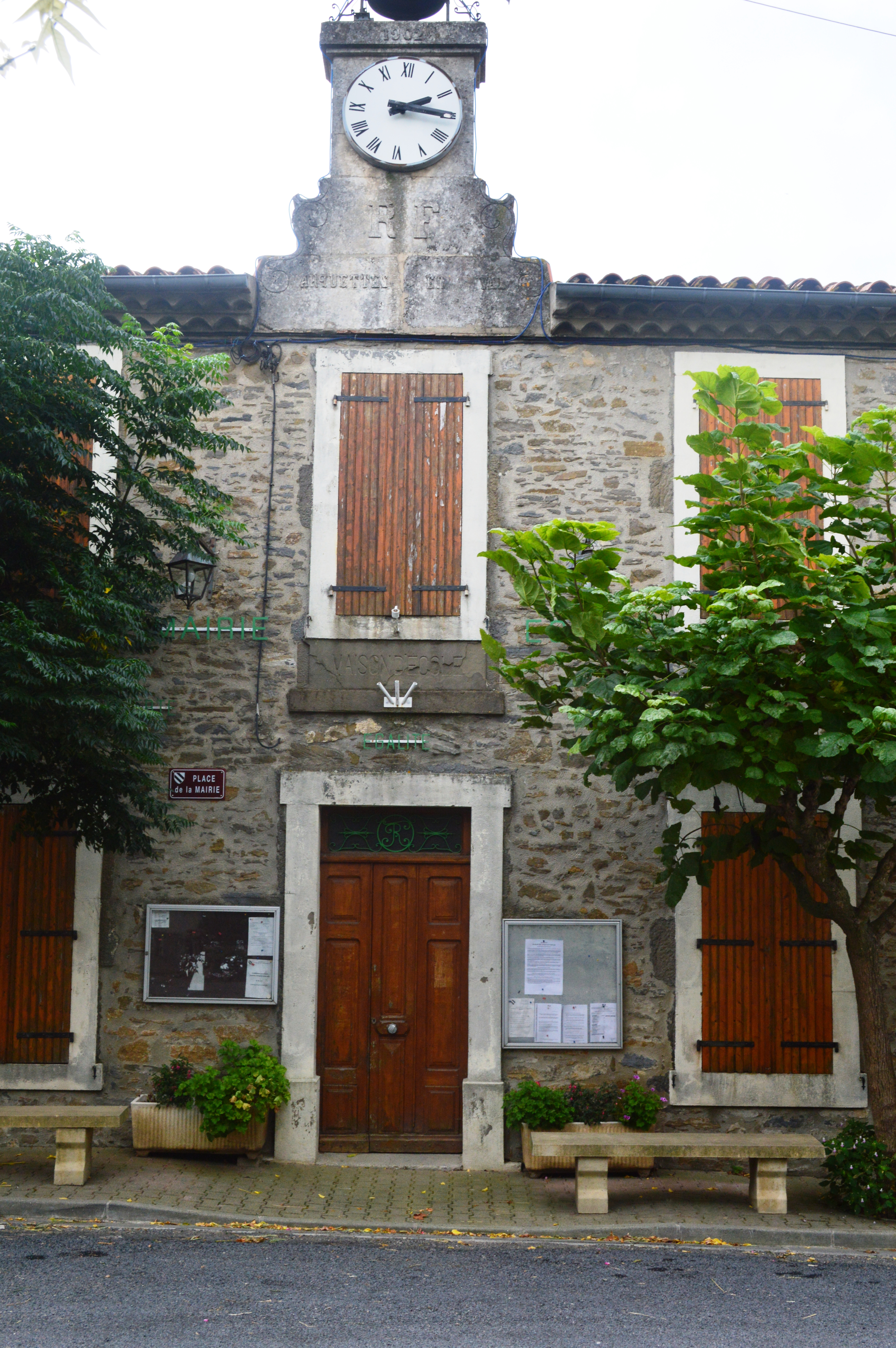
- The Town Hall

- Coat of arms
- Location of Arquettes-en-Val
- Location within France Location within Occitanie
- Coordinates: 43°06′14″N 2°30′11″E
- Country: France
- Region: Occitania
- Department: Aude
- Arrondissement: Carcassonne
- Canton: La Montagne d'Alaric
- Intercommunality: Carcassonne Agglo

Government
  - Mayor (2020–2026): André Pech
- Area^{1}: 9.31 km^{2} (3.59 sq mi)
- Elevation: 200 m (660 ft)
- Highest elevation: 561 m (1,841 ft)
- Lowest elevation: 195 m (640 ft)
- Population (2023): 83
  - Density: 8.9/km^{2} (23/sq mi)
- Time zone: UTC+01:00 (CET)
  - Summer (DST): UTC+02:00 (CEST)
- INSEE/Postal code: 11016 /11220
- ^{1} French Land Register data, which excludes lakes, ponds, glaciers > 1 km^{2} (0.386 sq mi or 247 acres) and river estuaries.

Arquettes-en-Val (French pronunciation: [aʁkɛt ɑ̃ val]; Occitan: Arquetas, before 1962: Arquettes) is a commune in the Aude department in the Occitanie region of southern France.

The commune is one of the rare ones in France that are free of debt.

== Geography ==
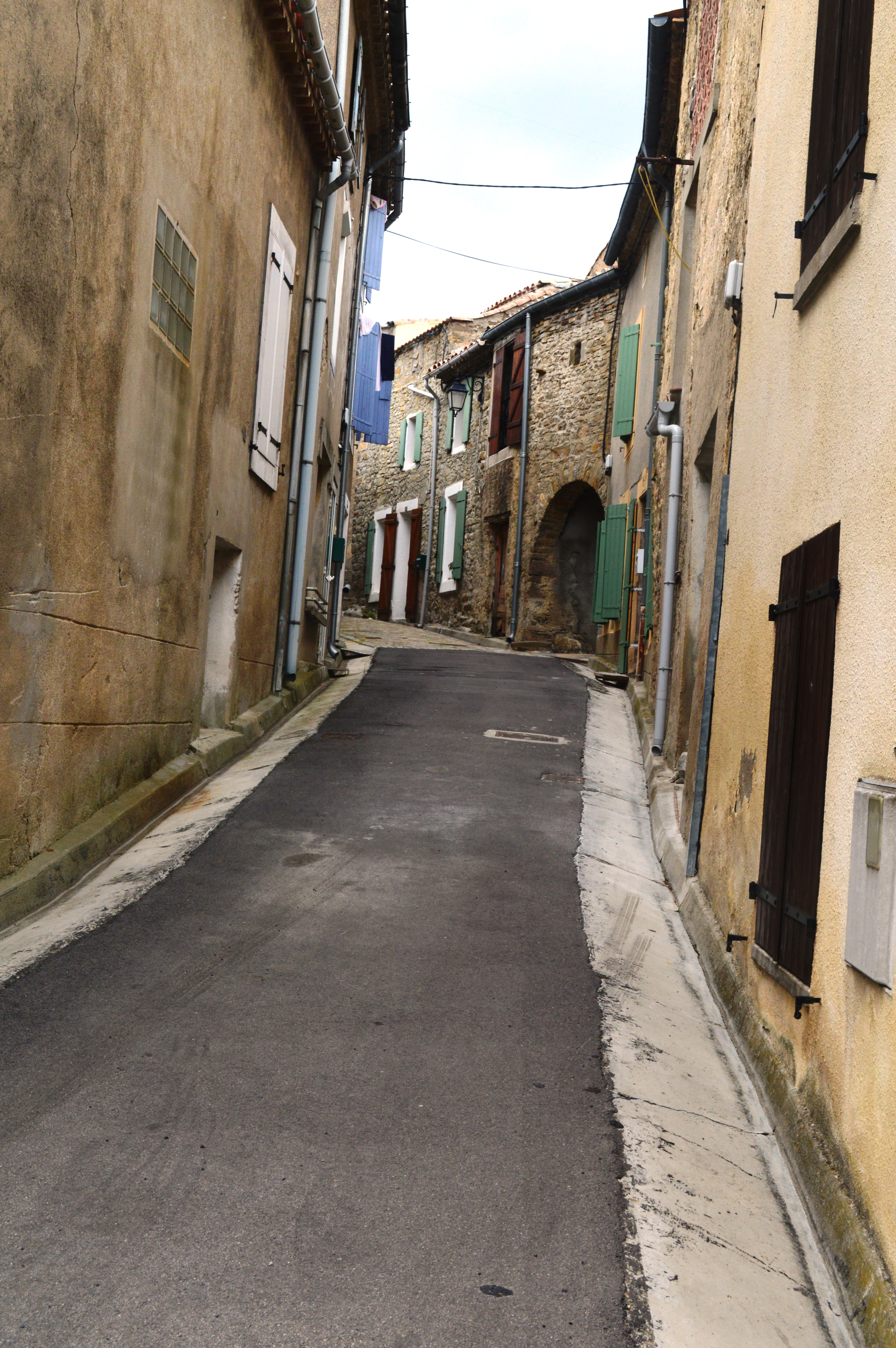
A Street in Arquettes-en-Val

Arquettes-sur-Val is located some 16 km south-east of Carcassonne and 4 km south-west of Montlaur. Access to the commune is by the D42 road from Palaja in the north-west passing through the commune and the village and continuing south to Serviès-en-Val. The D114 goes north-east from Serviès-en-Val to form part of the eastern border of the commune before joining the D3. The D714 road connects the D3 east of the commune to the village. The D310 goes south-west from the village to Villetritouls. The commune is rugged and forested in the north-west giving way to farmland in the south-east.

The Ruisseau des Lys rises in the north-east of the commune and flows south-east gathering many tributaries. The Ruisseau de Jonquiere rises near the village and flows south-east. The Ruisseau de Lanes rises in the north-west of the commune and also flows south-west gathering many tributaries. All of the streams join the Sou south-west of the commune.

== History ==
=== Heraldry ===
Arms of Arquettes-en-Val	Blazon: Argent, 2 bends of Sable.

== Administration ==
List of Successive Mayors

From	To	Name
1983	2001	Georges Bouges
2001	2008	Bruno Séguy
2008	2010	Lionel Carabosa
2010	2014	Bruno Séguy
2014	2026	André Pech

== Demography ==
The inhabitants of the commune are known as Arquettois or Arquettoises in French.

Historical population

Year	Pop.	±% p.a.
1793	114	—
1821	171	+1.46%
1846	208	+0.79%
1872	171	−0.75%
1901	269	+1.57%
1926	228	−0.66%
1946	158	−1.82%
1962	172	+0.53%
1968	148	−2.47%

Year	Pop.	±% p.a.
1975	114	−3.66%
1982	118	+0.49%
1990	111	−0.76%
1999	96	−1.60%
2007	94	−0.26%
2012	91	−0.65%
2017	79	−2.79%
2023	83	+0.83%

Source: EHESS and INSEE

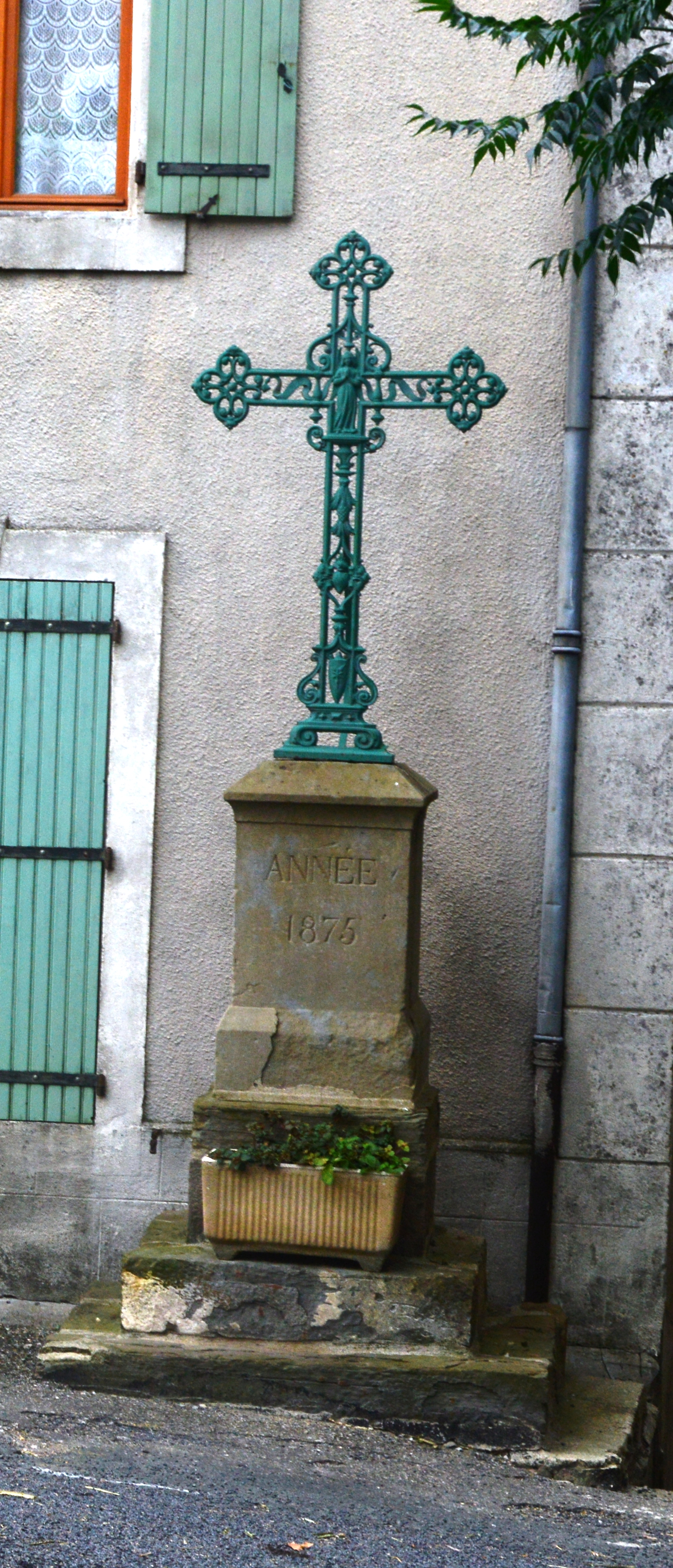
A Wayside Cross in Arquettes-en-Val

== Religious heritage ==
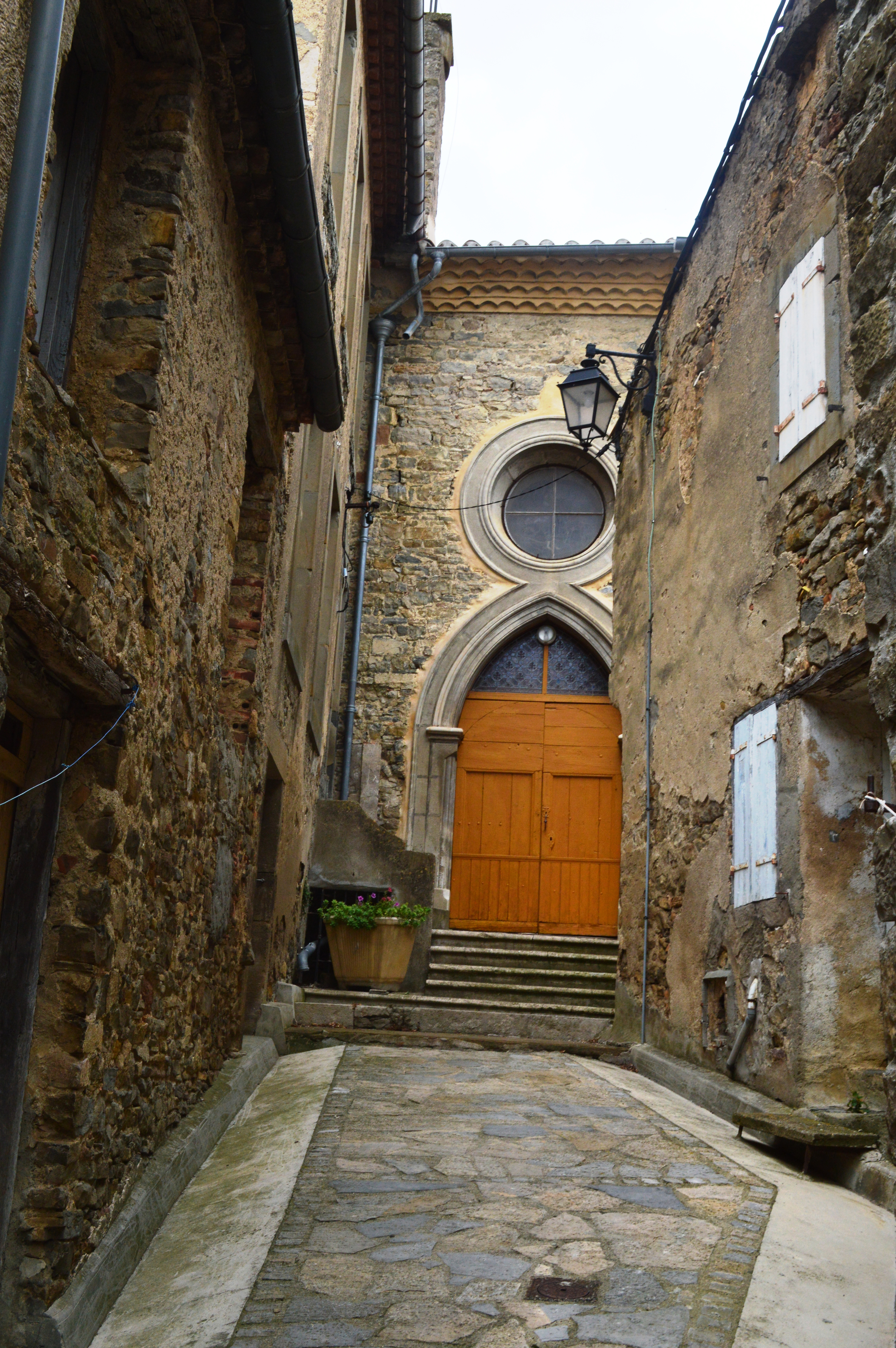
Entrance to the Church

The Church contains a Chasuble, Stole, Maniple, and Bourse de Corporal (17th century) which are registered as an historical object.

== Notable people linked to the commune ==
- Oliver de Termes (1200-1274), Lord of Termes and Arquettes-en-Val.
- Émile Pouytès, born at Rieux-Minervois on 1 June 1924, died at Montredon-des-Corbières on 4 March 1976. a winemaker in Arquettes-en-Val who attended a viticultural protest by winegrowers and was killed. There is a commemoration on the 1st Sunday of March at the Montredon-des-Corbières bridge.

== See also ==
- Val de Dagne
- Corbières AOC
- Communes of the Aude department
