= Elite One Championship 2007–2008 =

Elite One Championship 2007/08
- League: Elite One Championship
- Teams: 11
- Broadcast partners: (France) Canal+

2007–08
- Champions: Lézignan Sangliers
- League leaders: Lézignan Sangliers
- Runners-up: Pia XIII
- Top point-scorer: Philip Ramage (Limoux Grizzlies) 238 points
- Top try-scorer: Jared Taylor (Lézignan Sangliers) 34

Promotion and relegation
- Promoted from Elite Two Championship: SO Avignon
- Relegated to Elite Two Championship: RC Albi

The 2007/08 season was the fifth year of the Elite One Championship, the top level rugby league competition in France. The season commenced on 6 October 2007 and like the previous season, there were 11 teams with one team missing a round each week. A total of 22 rounds were played, with the last finishing on 12 April 2008 before the play-offs, that determined who played in the Grand Final. RC Albi were the league's new club having been promoted from the Elite Two Championship. Pia XIII were the defending champions having beaten Lézignan Sangliers in the 2006/2007 season Grand Final. The top 8 clubs qualified for the end of season play-offs. In the first week of the play-offs, Saint-Gaudens Bears and UTC both easily beat Toulouse Olympique and RC Albi respectively. However both teams were then beaten, Saint-Gaudens Bears by third placed AS Carcassonne, and UTC by Limoux Grizzlies in Week 2. Pia XIII beat AS Carcassonne in the first semi-final and a day later Lézignan Sangliers, the league leaders, squeezed past Limoux Grizzlies. In the Grand Final held at the Stade de la Mediterranee in Béziers, Lézignan Sangliers did what they had failed to do the previous season and beat Pia XIII 26-16, and thus winning the title for the first time. Despite finishing 8th and reaching the Lord Derby cup final RC Albi were relegated and Toulouse Olympique left the league and joined the English Rugby League system. SO Avignon were promoted from the 2nd tier. The Lord Derby Cup was won by Limoux Grizzlies.

== Table ==
	Team	Pld	W	D	L	PF	PA	PD	Pts
1	Lézignan Sangliers	20	18	0	2	829	366	+463	56
2	Pia XIII	20	16	0	4	663	326	+337	52
3	AS Carcassonne	20	14	0	6	578	343	+235	45
4	Limoux Grizzlies	20	12	0	8	549	388	+161	44
5	Union Treiziste Catalane	20	12	0	8	574	472	+102	42
6	Saint-Gaudens Bears	20	10	0	10	478	417	61	40
7	Toulouse Olympique	20	8	0	12	353	518	-165	36
8	RC Albi	20	5	0	15	361	533	-172	27
9	RC Carpentras XIII	20	5	0	15	319	841	-522	26
10	Lyon Villeurbanne XIII	20	5	0	15	320	561	-241	25
11	Villeneuve Leopards	20	5	0	15	311	570	-259	23

Points: win=3, draw=2, loss by less than 12 points=1

== Results ==
=== Round 1 ===
- Albi Tigers 24-36 Toulouse Olympique
- Pia Donkeys 30-0 Lyon-Villeurbanne
- Carcassonne 30-20 UTC
- Villeneuve Leopards 54-12 Carpentras
- Lézignan Sangliers 30-14 Saint-Gaudens Bears

=== Round 2 ===
- Toulouse Olympique 19-14 Villeneuve Leopards
- Carcassonne 17-24 Pia Donkeys
- Saint-Gaudens Bears 44-0 Albi Tigers
- Carpentras 30-0 Lyon-Villeurbanne
- Limoux Grizzlies 31-18 Lézignan Sangliers

=== Round 3 ===
- Albi Tigers 30-18 Limoux Grizzlies
- Lyon-Villeurbanne 10-24 Toulouse Olympique
- Villeneuve Leopards 16-36 Saint-Gaudens Bears
- Carpentras 4-44 Carcassonne
- UTC 43-28 Pia Donkeys

=== Round 4 ===
- Carcassonne 37-12 Toulouse Olympique
- Lézignan Sangliers 46-18 Albi Tigers
- UTC 32-16 Carpentras
- Limoux Grizzlies 40-10 Villeneuve Leopards
- Lyon-Villeurbanne 12-16 Saint-Gaudens Bears

=== Round 5 ===
- Villeneuve Leopards 24-50 Lézignan Sangliers
- Pia Donkeys 86-4 Carpentras
- Saint-Gaudens Bears 24-20 Carcassonne
- Limoux Grizzlies 38-4 Lyon-Villeurbanne
- Toulouse Olympique 32-40 UTC

=== Round 6 ===
- Albi Tigers 36-12 Villeneuve Leopards
- Carcassonne 35-0 Limoux Grizzlies
- Lyon-Villeurbanne 24-34 Lézignan Sangliers
- Saint-Gaudens Bears 48-14 UTC
- Toulouse Olympique 12-38 Pia Donkeys

=== Round 7 ===
- Pia Donkeys 54-8 Saint-Gaudens Bears
- Lyon-Villeurbanne 22-16 Albi Tigers
- Carpentras 28-16 Toulouse Olympique
- Lézignan Sangliers 38-11 Carcassonne
- UTC 30-22 Limoux Grizzlies

=== Round 8 ===
- Carcassonne 50-30 Albi Tigers
- Villeneuve Leopards 30-14 Lyon-Villeurbanne
- Saint-Gaudens Bears 54-18 Carpentras
- UTC 24-40 Lézignan Sangliers
- Limoux Grizzlies 30-32 Pia Donkeys

=== Round 9 ===
- Toulouse Olympique 14-10 Saint-Gaudens Bears
- Albi Tigers 8-12 UTC
- Villeneuve Leopards 3-22 Carcassonne
- Lézignan Sangliers 22-4 Pia Donkeys
- Limoux Grizzlies 28-14 Carpentras

=== Round 10 ===
- Toulouse Olympique 8-26 Limoux Grizzlies
- Pia Donkeys 27-4 Albi Tigers
- Carcassonne - Lyon-Villeurbanne
- UTC 66-6 Villeneuve Leopards
- Lézignan Sangliers 68-16 Carpentras

=== Round 11 ===
- Albi Tigers 35-8 Carpentras
- Pia Donkeys 10-6 Villeneuve Leopards
- Lyon-Villeurbanne 12-31 UTC
- Lézignan Sangliers 38-12 Toulouse Olympique
- Limoux Grizzlies 34-22 Saint-Gaudens Bears

=== Round 12 ===
- Toulouse Olympique 24-6 Albi Tigers
- Carpentras 28-10 Villeneuve Leopards
- Lyon-Villeurbanne 22-28 Pia Donkeys
- Saint-Gaudens Bears 18-34 Lézignan Sangliers
- UTC 10-28 Carcassonne

=== Round 13 ===
- Albi Tigers 18-38 Saint-Gaudens Bears
- Villeneuve Leopards 4-14 Toulouse Olympique
- Lyon-Villeurbanne 50-14 Carpentras
- Pia Donkeys 32-6 Carcassonne
- Lézignan Sangliers 52-12 Limoux Grizzlies

=== Round 14 ===
- Limoux Grizzlies 52-8 Albi Tigers
- Toulouse 28-10 Lyon-Villeurbanne
- Saint-Gaudens Bears 16-21 Villeneuve Leopards
- Carcassonne 74-14 Carpentras
- Pia Donkeys 30-20 UTC

=== Round 15 ===
- Albi Tigers 24-21 Lézignan Sangliers
- Saint-Gaudens Bears 12-14 Lyon-Villeurbanne
- Toulouse 10-19 Carcassonne
- Villeneuve Leopards 16-10 Limoux Grizzlies
- Carpentras 30-26 UTC

=== Round 16 ===
- Carcassonne 28-18 Saint-Gaudens Bears
- Lyon-Villeurbanne 18-16 Limoux Grizzlies
- UTC 28-4 Toulouse
- Lézignan Sangliers 66-6 Villeneuve Leopards
- Carpentras 66-16 Pia Donkeys

=== Round 17 ===
- Villeneuve Leopards 23-19 Albi Tigers
- Limoux Grizzlies 14-28 Carcassonne
- UTC 24-16 Saint-Gaudens Bears
- Lézignan Sangliers 50-26 Lyon-Villeurbanne
- Pia Donkeys 40-20 Toulouse

=== Round 18 ===
- Albi Tigers - Lyon-Villeurbanne
- Limoux Grizzlies 44-20 UTC
- Carcassonne 14-28 Lézignan Sangliers
- Saint-Gaudens Bears 22-20 Pia Donkeys
- Toulouse 36-20 Carpentras

=== Round 19 ===
- Albi Tigers 12-36 Carcassonne
- Lézignan Sangliers 42-34 UTC
- Pia Donkeys 48-16 Limoux Grizzlies
- Carpentras 6-42 Saint-Gaudens Bears
- Lyon-Villeurbanne - Villeneuve Leopards

=== Round 20 ===
- UTC 14-12 Albi Tigers
- Pia Donkeys 26-30 Lézignan Sangliers
- Carpentras 9-54 Limoux Grizzlies
- Saint-Gaudens Bears 18-6 Toulouse
- Carcassonne 22-14 Villeneuve Leopards

=== Round 21 ===
- Albi Tigers 12-22 Pia Donkeys
- Lézignan Sangliers 56-10 Carpentras
- Villeneuve Leopards 26-36 UTC
- Limoux Grizzlies 42-8 Toulouse
- Lyon-Villeurbanne 24-20 Carcassonne

=== Round 22 ===
- Carpentras 22-14 Albi Tigers
- Villeneuve Leopards 16-22 Pia Donkeys
- Toulouse 18-66 Toulouse
- UTC 70-12 Lyon-Villeurbanne
- Saint-Gaudens Bears 0-34 Limoux Grizzlies

== Play-offs ==
=== Round 1 ===
April 16, 2008

Saint-Gaudens Bears	40 - 10	Toulouse
Try: Vincent Almuzara; Simon Greaves; Anthony Golder (2); Karim Djemai; Stanfield; Fourcade Abasse; Goal: Simon Greaves (6)		Try: Andrei Olari; Laurent Carrasco; Goal: Damien Couturier

Stade Jules Ribet, Saint-Gaudens

April 20, 2008

UTC	31 - 8	Albi Tigers
Try: Denis Mounis; Mathieu Griffi; Ahlalou; Goal: Patrice Gomez (7); Drop: Patrice Gomez		Try: Julien Castagnet; Cedric Fabre; Goal:

Stade Gilbert Brutus, Perpignan

=== Round 2 ===
April 26, 2008

Carcassonne	30 - 22	Saint-Gaudens Bears
Try: Teddy Sadaoui (2); Sebastien Azema; Gregory Tiquet; Romaric Bemba; Goal: Frederic Banquet (5)		Try: Anthony Golder; Stanfield; Fourcade Abasse; Karim Djemai; Goal: Simon Greaves (3)

Stade Albert-Domec, Carcassonne

April 27, 2008

Limoux Grizzlies	34 - 18	UTC
Try: Mathieu Pala; Ismael Ximenez; Sam Key (2); Mathieu Mayans; Goal: Philip Ramage (7)		Try: Florian Quintilla; Sebastien Payan; Goal: Patrice Gomez (5)

Stade de l'Aiguille, Limoux

=== Round 3 ===
May 3, 2008

Pia Donkeys	38 - 26	Carcassonne
Try: Nicolas Piquemal; Mohamed Djalout; Paul Franze; Craig West; Anthony Carrere (2); Sebastien Martins; Goal: Anthony Carrere (3); Maxime Grésèque (2)		Try: Christophe Moly; Mathieu Alberola; Patrice Benausse; Cyril Armani; Goal: Frederic Banquet (5)

Stade Daniel Ambert, Pia

May 4, 2008

Lézignan Sangliers	25 - 18	Limoux Grizzlies
Try: Chris Beattie; Gregory Mazard; David Romero; Goal: Jared Taylor (2); Nicolas Munoz (4); Drop: James Wynne		Try: Mathieu Pala; John O'Sullivan; Herve Marrot; Goal: Phillip Ramage (3)

Stade du Moulin, Lézignan-Corbières

== Final ==
May 17, 2008

Lézignan Sangliers	26 - 16	Pia Donkeys
Try: Jared Taylor (2); Franck Rovira; Gregory Mazard; Goal: James Wynne (2); Nicolas Munoz (3)		Try: Nicolas Piquemal; Sebastien Martins; Dean Bosnich; Goal: Maxime Grésèque (2)

Stade de la Méditerranée, Béziers
Attendance: 8233
Referee: M.Drizza

== Records ==
=== Club ===
- Most Victories: Lézignan Sangliers; 18
- Least Victories: Albi Tigers, Lyon-Villeurbanne, Carpentras, Villeneuve Leopards; 5
- Best Offense: Lézignan Sangliers; 829
- Worst Offense: Villeneuve Leopards; 309
- Best Defense: Carcassonne; 343
- Worst Defense: Carpentras; 861
- Biggest Margin: R5 Pia Donkeys 86-4 Carpentras; 82pts
- Most Points: R5 Pia Donkeys 86-4 Carpentras; 90pts
- Least Points: R11 Pia Donkeys 10-6 Villeneuve Leopards; 16pts

=== Player ===
- Top Points Scorer: Philip Ramage (Limoux Grizzlies); 238
- Top Try Scorer: Jared Taylor (Lézignan Sangliers); 34
- Top Conversion Scorer: Nicolas Munoz (Lézignan Sangliers); 98
- Top Drop-Kick Scorer: Frederic Banquet (Carcassonne); 4

== See also ==
- Rugby league in France
