= Antoni Maria =

France international rugby league footballer

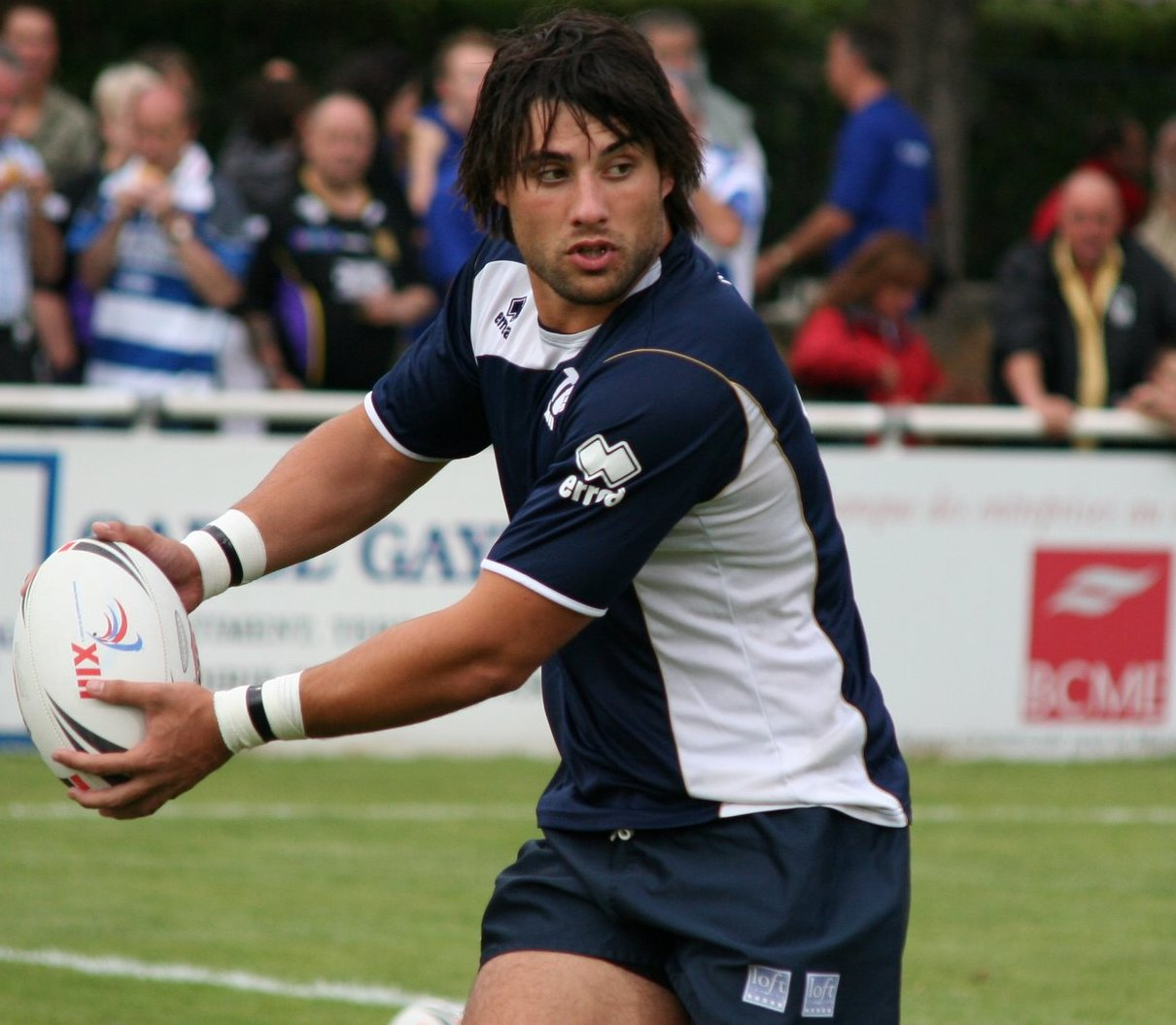

Personal information
- Born: 21 March 1987 (age 39) Sainte-Livrade-sur-Lot, Lot-et-Garonne, Nouvelle-Aquitaine, France
- Height: 6 ft 2 in (1.89 m)
- Weight: 15 st 10 lb (100 kg)

Playing information
- Position: Prop, Second-row
Club
| Years | Team | Pld | T | G | FG | P |
|---|---|---|---|---|---|---|
| 2007–08 | Saint-Gaudens Bears | 15 | 1 | 0 | 0 | 4 |
| 2009–11 | Toulouse Olympique | 63 | 11 | 0 | 0 | 44 |
| | Saint-Esteve |
| 2012–16 | Catalans Dragons | 41 | 1 | 0 | 0 | 4 |
| 2017 | Leigh Centurions | 15 | 2 | 0 | 0 | 8 |
| 2018–20 | Catalans Dragons | 34 | 1 | 0 | 0 | 4 |
| 2019(loan) | → Hull Kingston Rovers | 6 | 0 | 0 | 0 | 0 |
| 2021– | FC Lezignan | 39 | 5 | 0 | 0 | 0 |
| | Total | 213 | 21 | 0 | 0 | 64 |
Representative
| Years | Team | Pld | T | G | FG | P |
| 2012–17 | France | 11 | 0 | 0 | 0 | 0 |
- Source: As of 8 August 2026
- Relatives: Franck Maria (brother)

Antoni Maria (born 21 March 1987) is a French rugby league footballer who plays as a prop for FC Lezignan in the Elite One Championship and France at international level.

He previously played in France for the Saint-Gaudens Bears in the Elite One Championship, Toulouse Olympique French top flight and the Co-operative Championship and Saint-Esteve in the Elite One Championship. Maria then transferred to the Catalans Dragons and the Leigh Centurions in the Super League. He spent time on loan from the Dragons at Hull Kingston Rovers.

== Background ==
Maria was born in Sainte-Livrade-sur-Lot, France. He is the elder brother of professional rugby league footballer Franck Maria.

== Club career ==
=== Toulouse Olympique ===
Maria began his career at Toulouse Olympique in the Championship between 2009 and 2011.

=== Catalans Dragons ===
When Toulouse withdrew from the Championship, Maria joined Super League club Catalans Dragons, making his Super League début against Castleford Tigers in 2012.

=== Leigh Centurions ===
Maria joined Leigh Centurions for the 2017 season following their promotion to Super League.

=== Catalans Dragons (return) ===
In October 2017 Maria signed a two-year deal to return to Catalans Dragons.

==== Hull Kingston Rovers ====
On 25 April 2019 he joined Hull Kingston Rovers on an initial one month's loan due to an injury crisis at the East Hull outfit. He made his debut for the Robins 3 days later in the 28-24 away defeat by the Leeds Rhinos

=== FC Lézignan XIII ===
On 17 July 2020 it was reported that he had signed for FC Lézignan XIII in the Elite One Championship

== International career ==
Maria is a France international. He was a member of the French team that played in the 2013 Rugby League World Cup, in the 2014 and 2015 European Cup tournaments. He also played for France in their 2015 European Cup mid-tournament test-match against England.
