= Bastien Canet =

France international rugby league footballer

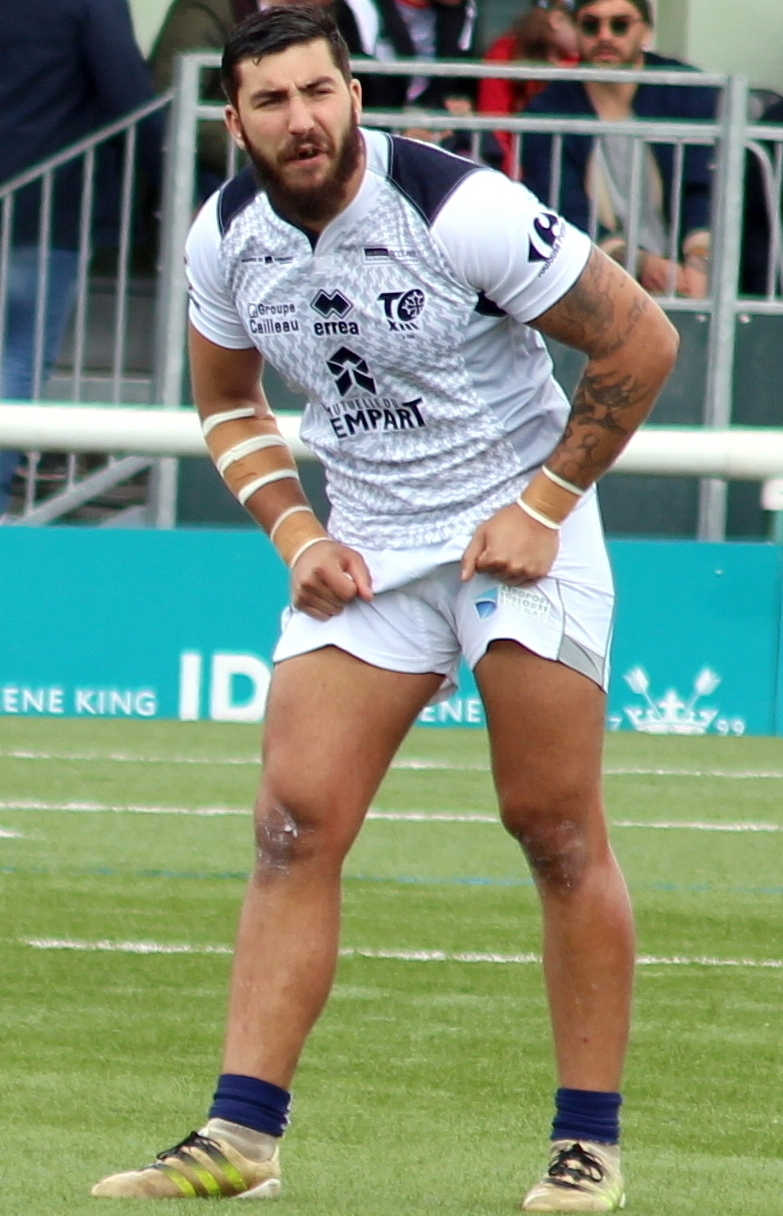

Personal information
- Born: 26 June 1993 (age 33) Val de Dagne, Aude, Occitania, France
- Height: 6 ft 1 in (186 cm)
- Weight: 16 st 12 lb (107 kg; 236 lb)

Playing information
- Position: Prop, Loose forward, Second-row
Club
| Years | Team | Pld | T | G | FG | P |
|---|---|---|---|---|---|---|
| 2011–15 | AS Carcassonne | 38 | 6 | 0 | 0 | 24 |
| 2015–18 | Toulouse Olympique | 75 | 31 | 0 | 0 | 124 |
| 2018– | AS Carcassonne | 84 | 23 | 0 | 0 | 92 |
| | Total | 197 | 60 | 0 | 0 | 240 |
Representative
| Years | Team | Pld | T | G | FG | P |
| 2015–19 | France | 2 | 0 | 0 | 0 | 0 |
| 2019– | France 9s | 2 | 0 | 0 | 0 | 0 |
- Source: As of 19 October 2019

Bastien Canet (born 26 June 1993) is a French professional rugby league footballer who plays as a prop, lock or second-row for AS Carcassonne in the Elite One Championship.

== Background ==
Canet was born in Val de Dagne, Aude, France.

== Career ==
Canet came through the youth system at Val de Dagne XIII. He then began his playing career at AS Carcassonne.

== International career ==
He was selected in France 9s squad for the 2019 Rugby League World Cup 9s.
