= Max Bailey (rugby league) =

Australian rugby league player

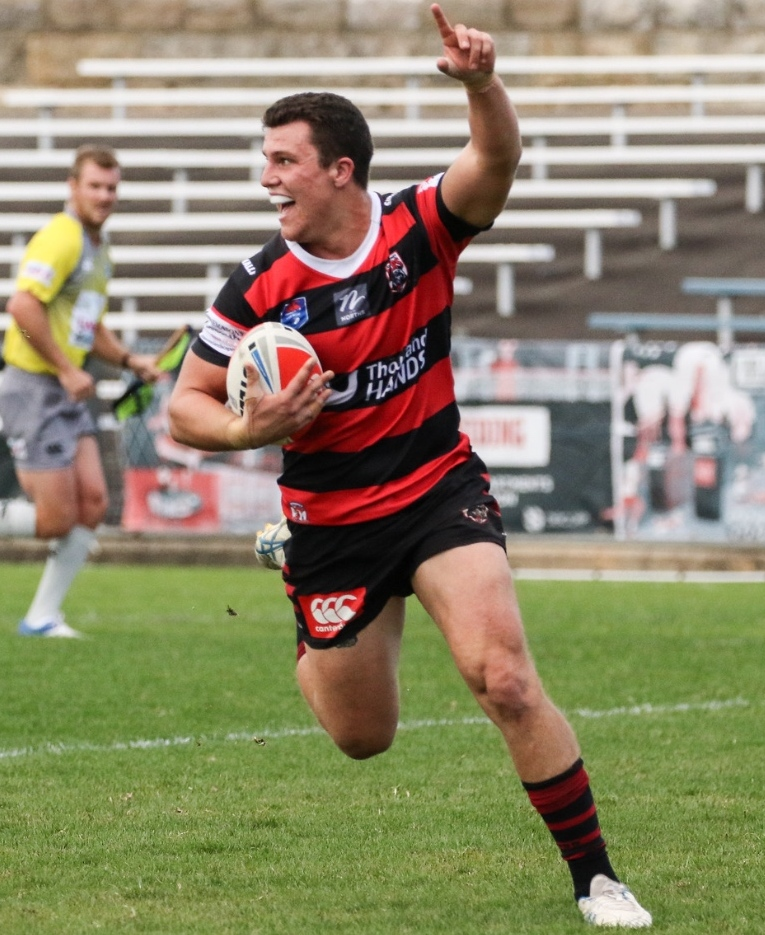

Personal information
- Full name: Max "steak" Bailey
- Born: 3 February 1997 (age 29) Wollongong, New South Wales, Australia
- Height: 185 cm (6 ft 1 in)
- Weight: 100 kg (15 st 10 lb)

Playing information
- Position: Lock
Club
Years	Team	Pld	T	G	FG	P
2020	Sydney Roosters	1	0	0	0	0
- Source: As of 21 July 2022

Max Bailey (3 February 1997) is a professional rugby league footballer who plays as a prop for FC Lezignan in the Super XIII.

He previously played for the Sydney Roosters in the NRL and the Redcliffe Dolphins and Sunshine Coast Falcons in the QLD Cup.

== Career ==
=== 2020 ===
Bailey made his first grade debut in round 13 of the 2020 NRL season for the Sydney Roosters against the St George Illawarra Dragons.As of 2021 Max has worked as a science teacher at Nambour State College.
