= Val-de-Dagne =

Commune in Occitanie, France

- Commune
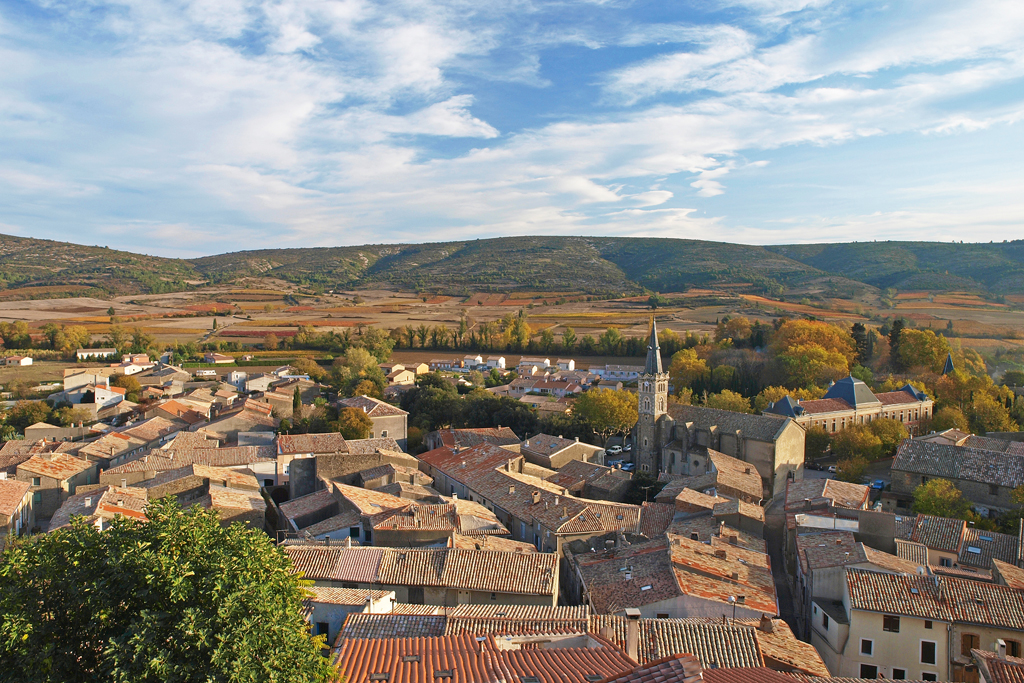
- The village of Montlaur
- Location of Val-de-Dagne
- Location within France Location within Occitanie
- Coordinates: 43°07′50″N 2°33′31″E
- Country: France
- Region: Occitania
- Department: Aude
- Arrondissement: Carcassonne
- Canton: La Montagne d'Alaric
- Intercommunality: Carcassonne Agglo

Government
  - Mayor (2020–2026): Antonin Andrieu
- Area^{1}: 50.11 km^{2} (19.35 sq mi)
- Highest elevation: 552 m (1,811 ft)
- Lowest elevation: 135 m (443 ft)
- Population (2023): 731
  - Density: 14.6/km^{2} (37.8/sq mi)
- Time zone: UTC+01:00 (CET)
  - Summer (DST): UTC+02:00 (CEST)
- INSEE/Postal code: 11251 /11220
- ^{1} French Land Register data, which excludes lakes, ponds, glaciers > 1 km^{2} (0.386 sq mi or 247 acres) and river estuaries.

Val-de-Dagne (French pronunciation: [val də daɲ]; Occitan: Val de Danha) is a commune in the Aude department in southern France. The municipality was established on 1 January 2019 by the merger of the former communes of Montlaur and Pradelles-en-Val.

== See also ==
- Communes of the Aude department
