= Gilbert Benausse =

France international rugby league footballer

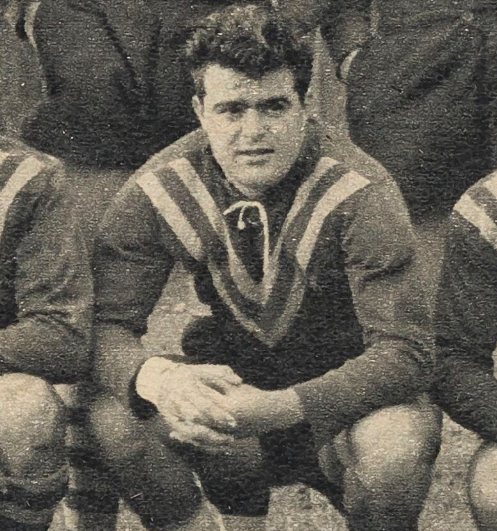

Personal information
- Born: 21 January 1932 Carcassonne, France
- Died: 24 November 2006 (aged 74) Carcassonne, France

Playing information
- Height: 5 ft 9 in (1.75 m)
- Weight: 12 st 0 lb (76 kg)
- Position: Centre, Stand-off, Scrum-half
Club
Years	Team	Pld	T	G	FG	P
1947–55	AS Carcassonne
1955–57	Toulouse Olympique
1957–68	FC Lézignan XIII
	Total	0	0	0	0	0
Representative
Years	Team	Pld	T	G	FG	P
1951–64	France	45	17	57	0	165
- Relatives: Patrice Benausse (son); René Benausse (brother)

Gilbert Benausse (born 21 January 1932 in Carcassonne – died 24 November 2006 in Carcassonne) was a French rugby league footballer who played in the 1950s and 1960s. He played at the international level for France, and at club level for AS Carcassonne, Lézignan Sangliers and Toulouse Olympique, playing at centre, stand-off, or scrum-half.

== Playing career ==
Benausse succeeded Puig Aubert as the captain of France, and was one of the main protagonists of the victorious 1955 tour to Australia, and he competed in the 1954 Rugby League World Cup and 1957 Rugby League World Cup.

=== International honours ===
Benausse won caps for France while at AS Carcassonne in 1951 against New Zealand (2 matches), in 1952 against Australia, in 1953 against Australia (2 matches), in the 1954 Rugby League World Cup against New Zealand, and Great Britain, in 1955 against Australia (2 matches), New Zealand, and Other Nationalities, in 1956 against Australia (3 matches), and New Zealand, in 1957 against Great Britain (3 matches), in the 1957 Rugby League World Cup against Great Britain, New Zealand, and Australia, and while at FC Lezignan in 1958 against Great Britain, in 1959 against Great Britain, and Australia, in 1960 against Great Britain, and Australia, in 1961 against Great Britain, and New Zealand (3 matches), in 1962 against Great Britain (3 matches), and in 1964 against Australia.

Note: The total of 34 matches detailed above, is less the French record 49 International caps widely attributed to Gilbert Benausse, this could be due in part that prior to 1957, matches between France and Great Britain were not considered as Test matches by the Rugby Football League, and consequently caps were not awarded, at least to the Great Britain footballers.

=== French Rugby League Championship ===
Benausse played in AS Carcassonne's 1951–52 and 1952–53 French Rugby League Championship victories, and 1954–55 French Rugby League Championship defeat, and FC Lezignan's 1960–61 and 1962–63 French Rugby League Championship victories, and 1958–59 French Rugby League Championship defeat.

=== Lord Derby Cup ===
Benausse played in AS Carcassonne's 1950–51 and 1951–52 Lord Derby Cup victories, and FC Lezignan's 1959–60 and 1965–66 Lord Derby Cup victories, and 1960–61 Lord Derby Cup defeat.

== Lifetime honours ==
Benausse was voted player of the tournament in the 1954 Rugby League World Cup.

Benausse was voted rugby league footballer of the world in 1960.

In 2001, Benausse received the National Sports Career Prize awarded by the 'French Association for Sport without Violence and with Fair Play' (l'AFSVFP) from Marie-George Buffet, the Minister of Youth and Sport.

== Memorial honours ==
In Benausse's honour, the Romieu Stadium was renamed the Gilbert Benausse complex.

Benausse was included in the AS Carcassonne supporters all-time team announced on 24 January 2010.

== Personal life ==
Benausse was the brother of France Wing (2 test matches against Great Britain) of the 1960s, René Benausse and father of Lézignan Sangliers and AS Carcassonne Fullback and Wing of the 1990s and 2000s Patrice Benausse. He also worked as a civil servant.
