= Villar-en-Val =

Commune in Occitanie, France

- Commune
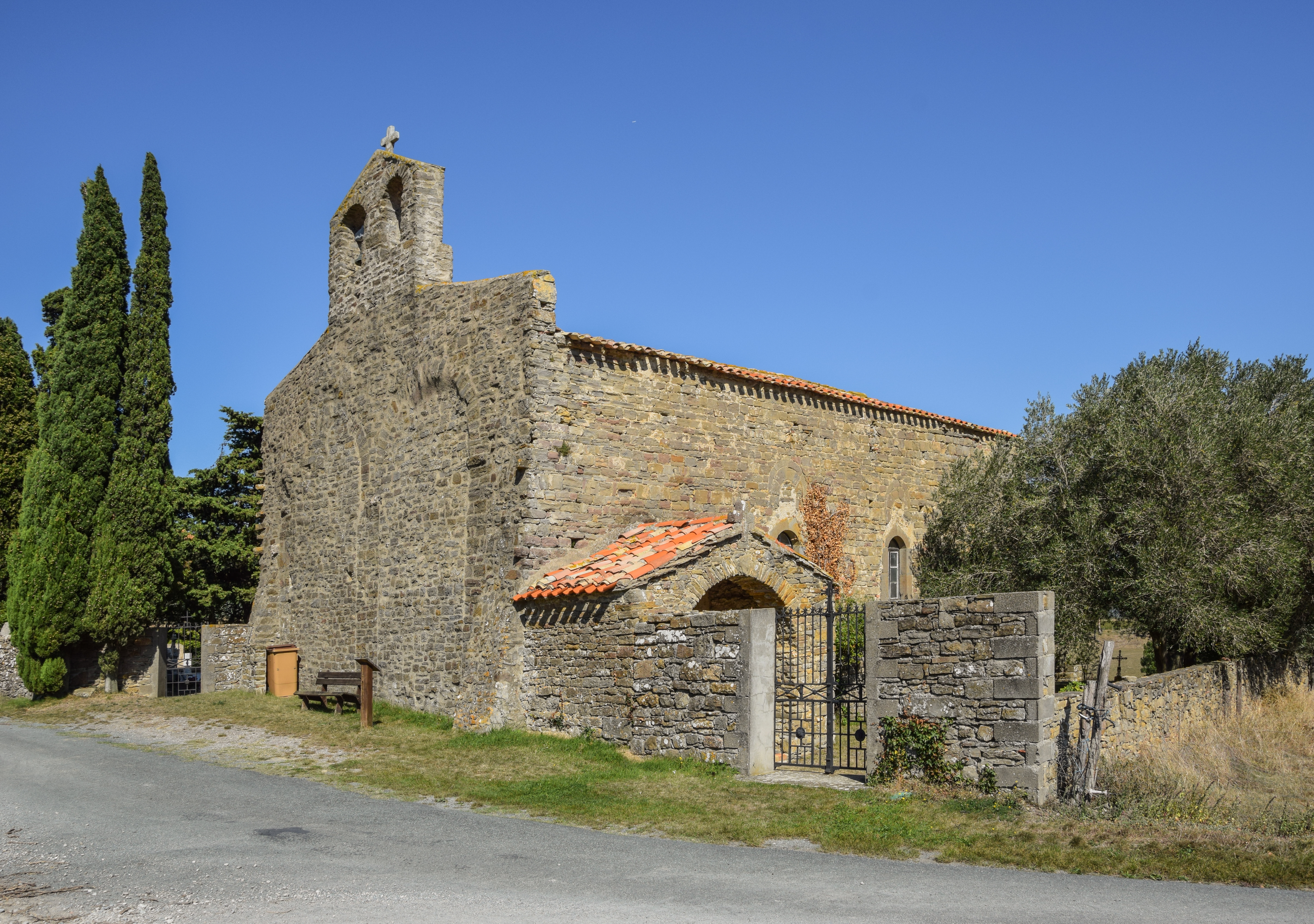
- The church in Villar-en-Val

- Coat of arms
- Location of Villar-en-Val
- Location within France Location within Occitanie
- Coordinates: 43°05′01″N 2°27′29″E
- Country: France
- Region: Occitania
- Department: Aude
- Arrondissement: Carcassonne
- Canton: La Montagne d'Alaric
- Intercommunality: Carcassonne Agglo

Government
  - Mayor (2020–2026): Magali Arnaud
- Area^{1}: 11.42 km^{2} (4.41 sq mi)
- Elevation: 271 m (889 ft)
- Highest elevation: 640 m (2,100 ft)
- Lowest elevation: 238 m (781 ft)
- Population (2023): 23
  - Density: 2.0/km^{2} (5.2/sq mi)
- Time zone: UTC+01:00 (CET)
  - Summer (DST): UTC+02:00 (CEST)
- INSEE/Postal code: 11414 /11220
- ^{1} French Land Register data, which excludes lakes, ponds, glaciers > 1 km^{2} (0.386 sq mi or 247 acres) and river estuaries.

Villar-en-Val (French pronunciation: [vilaʁ ɑ̃ val]; Occitan: Le Vilar en Val) is a commune in the Aude department in southern France.

== Population ==
Historical population
Year	Pop.	±% p.a.
1968	29	—
1975	23	−3.26%
1982	26	+1.77%
1990	25	−0.49%
1999	30	+2.05%
2007	33	+1.20%
2012	30	−1.89%
2017	26	−2.82%
2023	23	−2.02%
Source: INSEE

== See also ==
- Val de Dagne
- Corbières AOC
- Communes of the Aude department
