= Elite One Championship 2020–2021 =

- League: Elite One Championship
- Teams: 10
- Broadcast partners: (France) ViàOccitanie

2020–21
- Champions: FC Lézignan; 4th Elite One title
- League leaders: AS Carcassonne

The 2020–21 Elite One Championship was the 86th season of France's domestic rugby league competition and the 20th season known as the Elite One Championship. There were ten teams in the league. Each team played 18 matches in the regular season. The top six teams progressed to the finals series.

There were no draws. In case of an equal score, the rule of the "Golden point" was applied.

Due to the COVID-19 pandemic, games were played behind closed doors.

Some games were televised on the free to air TV regional channel ViàOccitanie. Yet, as this channel was facing economic difficulties, the clubs tend to broadcast their home games via the social networks.

With the 2019–2020 season having been cancelled, Saint-Estève Catalan began the season as defending champions having defeated AS Carcassonne 32–24 in the Grand Final of the 2019–2020 Championship.

== Teams ==
Location of teams in 2020-21 season

Team	Stadium	Location
Albi RL	Stadium Mazicou	Albi, Tarn
SO Avignon	Parc des Sports (Avignon)	Avignon, Vaucluse
AS Carcassonne	Stade Albert Domec	Carcassonne, Aude
FC Lézignan	Stade du Moulin	Lézignan-Corbières, Aude
Limoux Grizzlies	Stade de l'Aiguille	Limoux, Aude
Palau XIII Broncos	Stade Georges Vaills	Palau-del-Vidre, Pyrénées-Orientales
Saint-Estève Catalan	Stade Municipal	Perpignan, Pyrénées-Orientales
Saint-Gaudens Bears	Stade Jules Ribet	Saint-Gaudens, Haute-Garonne
Toulouse Olympique Broncos	Stade des Minimes	Toulouse, Haute-Garonne
Villeneuve Leopards	Stade Max Rousie	Villeneuve-sur-Lot, Lot-et-Garonne

== Regular season ==
The regular season started on 31 October 2021 and ended on 29 May 2021. Each team played every other team twice, once at home and the other away making 18 games for each team and a total of 90 games. The "Magic Weekend" scheduled for round 4 was cancelled.

=== Table and results ===
Pos	Team	Pld	W	L	PF	PA	PD	BP	Pts	Qualification	CAR	LEZ	STE	LIM	AVI	VIL	ALB	PAL	TOU	STG
1	Carcassonne	18	16	2	558	344	+214	2	50	Semi-finals	—	36–32	24–18	12–16	30–8	42–14	37–4	46–16	24–22	36–24
2	Lézignan	18	14	4	620	353	+267	3	45	Semi-finals	20–16	—	22–20	24–32	28–22	38–4	54–26	54–6	40–8	46–6
3	Saint-Estève Catalan	18	12	6	512	358	+154	5	41	Qualifiers	24–28	14–8	—	46–24	30–38	26–16	42–22	30–22	30–18	50–14
4	Limoux	18	12	6	508	324	+184	5	41	Qualifiers	26–28	30–42	22–12	—	16–20	14–10	28–0	24–14	64–0	62–12
5	Avignon	18	11	7	547	406	+141	4	37	Qualifiers	12–36	28–40	14–20	10–16	—	40–10	64–18	40–24	64–12	52–30
6	Villeneuve	18	11	7	473	405	+68	2	35	Qualifiers	12–37	25–10	22–8	14–34	38–18	—	42–16	60–4	42–16	36–30
7	Albi	18	4	14	366	549	−183	7	19		18–30	22–34	24–30	20–12	24–31	22–24	—	14–24	48–24	40–12
8	Palau Broncos	18	3	15	376	585	−209	8	17		34–42	30–40	14–36	20–40	22–24	32–34	27–10	—	37–18	22–23
9	Toulouse Olympique	18	4	14	304	583	−279	5	17		12–20	12–42	6–36	26–14	10–36	12–18	16–26	36–18	—	26–24
10	Saint-Gaudens	18	3	15	297	654	−357	4	13		32–34	16–46	20–40	14–34	2–26	6–52	18–12	14–10	0–30	—

- 3 points for a victory
- 1 point bonus for losing team if the margin is less than 12
- If two teams have equal points then the separation factor is the point difference in head-to-head matches between the specific teams. If a team has a greater point difference they rank higher on the table. If still tied then overall points difference will be the tie-breaker.

== Finals ==
At the end of the regular season, the top six in the table advanced to the knockout stage. First and second received a bye for the first week of finals as third played sixth (Qualifying Final 1) and fourth played fifth (Qualifying Final 2), with the losers of both matches eliminated.

=== Bracket ===
Elimination-Finals
4	Limoux	22
5	Avignon	24
3	Saint-Estève Catalan	43
6	Villeneuve	24

Semi-Finals
1	Carcassonne	27
5	Avignon	18
2	Lézignan	26
3	Saint-Estève Catalan	18

Grand Final
1	Carcassonne	12
2	Lézignan	16

All playoffs games were broadcast on YouTube.

=== Grand Final ===
20 June 2021
15:00 UTC+02:00 (CEST)

FC Lézignan	16 – 12	AS Carcassonne
	Report

Stade Ernest-Wallon, Toulouse
Attendance: 3,200

== Media ==
=== Television ===
Unlike, for instance, the BBC, France Television didn't offer any program to the French public about Rugby League. This has been a real issue for the game. Explanations usually given are the low number of participants in France but also pressure which would be made by the Union authorities on the French Public Television Group.

In the early 2020s, some Elite 1 games are televised by a local channel ViàOccitanie; this is a free-to-air channel in the South of France but they are also available on the internet and via the triple play internet devices. Therefore, they offer, indirectly, a nationwide coverage of the domestic championship.

Presently, French clubs have to fund the broadcast of their own games or to televise their own matches themselves via the social networks or YouTube.

=== Radio ===
Radio Marseillette, a local Southern radio, has rugby league debate and news every Saturday from 10:00 to 12:00. They also have commentary on some Elite League games.

=== Press ===
The French national mainstream media barely follow the game. Very occasionally, some articles about the sport are published in newspapers such as Le Monde, Le Figaro or the national Sport newspaper L'Équipe.

Nevertheless, there is undoubtedly a French specificity: the Weekly Rugby Union magazine Midi Olympique has a one-page section devoted to Rugby League. However, only two local newspapers genuinely cover the game; L'Indépendant ( based in the South of France) and la Dépêche du Midi (based in the South west of the country).

The British Rugby League press cover this championship; for example magazines like Rugby Leaguer & League Express offer a weekly report of the games. In Australia, the monthly publication Rugby League Review offer a few columns about the games as well.
