= Benjamin Tort =

Spain international rugby league player

Personal information
- Full name: Benjamin Tort
- Born: 15 December 1992 (age 32)

Playing information
- Height: 6 ft 1 in (1.85 m)
- Weight: 13 st 12 lb (88 kg)
- Position: Centre, Wing, Second-row
Club
Years	Team	Pld	T	G	FG	P
2013–23	FC Lezignan	86	35	0	0	140

Benjamin Tort (born 15 December 1992) is a former French rugby league footballer who played for FC Lezignan in the Elite One Championship. He was a centre.

== Playing career ==
Tort was at FC Lezignan for twelve years during which time the club won the Lord Derby Cup (2015) and the Elite 1 Championship (2020–21). He retired at the end of the 2022–23 season.

In January 2019, Tort was selected for the President's XIII team, a selection of the best players of the France Elite Championship, for a friendly against Catalans Dragons. The President's XIII lost the game 38–14.

=== International ===
He was selected for Spain's train-on squad for the 2021 Men's Rugby League World Cup qualifying tournament, but was not included in the 22-man tournament squad.
