= Elite One Championship 2010–2011 =

Elite One Championship 2010/11
- League: Elite One Championship
- Teams: 10

2010/11
- Champions: Lézignan Sangliers
- League leaders: Lézignan Sangliers

Promotion and relegation
- Promoted from Championship (rugby league), Elite Two Championship: Toulouse Olympique, RC Lescure-Arthes XIII
- Relegated to Elite Two Championship: RC Carpentras XIII, Saint-Gaudens Bears

Season 2010–2011 in the French Elite One Championship the top level league competition saw Lézignan Sangliers retain their title after they finished top of the table and then went on to beat Limoux Grizzlies in the Grand Final in Narbonne 17-12. The season ran from October to May and after 20 rounds of home and away matches the top five entered the play-offs. At the end of the season both RC Carpentras XIII and Saint-Gaudens Bears were relegated. The Lord Derby Cup was also won by Lezignan Sagliers to complete a second successive league and cup double, they beat Pia XIII in the final 27-18 in Carcassonne.

== Table ==
Pos	Team	Pld	W	D	L	PF	PA	Pts
1	Lézignan Sangliers	20	17	0	3	776	413	54
2	Limoux Grizzlies	20	17	0	3	741	405	54
3	Pia XIII	20	15	0	5	858	474	50
4	Villeneuve Leopards	20	11	0	9	536	527	42
5	AS Carcassonne	20	10	1	9	624	448	41
6	SO Avignon	20	9	1	10	604	655	39
7	Saint-Esteve XIII Catalan	20	7	1	12	587	579	34
8	RC Carpentras XIII	20	5	2	13	450	805	31
9	Saint-Gaudens Bears	20	4	0	16	395	778	28
10	Montpellier Red Devils	20	2	1	17	362	849	25

Points win=3: draw=2: loss=1:

== Play-offs ==
Week 1

- Elimination Quarter-Final - Villeneuve Leopards 37-30 AS Carcassonne
- Qualifying Final - Limoux Grizzlies 8-22 Pia XIII

Week 2

- Elimination Semi-Final - Limoux Grizzlies 40-24 Villeneuve Leopards
- Major Semi-Final - Lézignan Sangliers 25-24 Pia XIII

Week 3

- Elimination Final - Pia XIII 12-26 Limoux Grizzlies

== Grand Final ==
Winners	Score	Runners-up	Venue	Attendance
FC Lézignan	17 – 12	Limoux Grizzlies	Parc des sports et de l'amitié, Narbonne	11,874

== See also ==
- Rugby league in France
- French Rugby League Championship
