= Elite One Championship 2009–2010 =

Elite One Championship 2009/10
- League: Elite One Championship
- Teams: 9

2009/10
- Champions: Lézignan Sangliers
- League leaders: Lézignan Sangliers

Promotion and relegation
- Promoted from Elite Two Championship: Montpellier Red Devils

The 2009/10 season of the Elite One Championship saw the league reduced to 9 teams with each team playing home and away with the top 5 going on to contest the play-offs. The season ran from October to May with Lézignan Sangliers eventually coming out on top after beating Pia XIII in the final which was played in Montpellier. This victory completed a league and cup double coming just a month after they had beaten Limoux Grizzlies in the Lord Derby Cup final 18-14 in Avignon.

== Table ==
Pos	Team	Pld	W	D	L	PF	PA	Pts
1	Lézignan Sangliers	16	14	0	2	588	353	44
2	AS Carcassonne	16	11	0	5	500	325	38
3	Limoux Grizzlies	16	10	0	6	469	329	36
4	Pia XIII	16	10	0	6	500	386	36
5	Saint-Esteve XIII Catalan	16	8	0	8	454	374	32
6	RC Carpentras XIII	16	8	0	8	456	440	32
7	Villeneuve Leopards	16	6	1	9	372	446	29
8	SO Avignon	16	3	1	12	332	602	23
9	Saint-Gaudens Bears	16	1	0	15	232	648	18

Points win=3: draw=2: loss=1

== Play-offs ==
Week 1

- Elimination Quarter-Final - Pia XIII 25-24 Saint-Esteve XIII Catalan
- Qualifying Final - AS Carcassonne 31-10 Limoux Grizzlies

Week 2

- Elimination Semi-Final - Limoux Grizzlies 20-38 Pia XIII
- Major Semi-Final - Lézignan Sangliers 54-12 AS Carcassonne

Week 3

- Elimination Final - AS Carcassonne 16-17 Pia XIII

== Grand Final ==
Winners	Score	Runners-up	Venue	Attendance
FC Lézignan	32 – 22	Baroudeurs de Pia XIII	Altrad Stadium, Montpellier	6,612

== See also ==
- Rugby league in France
- French Rugby League Championship
