= Patrice Benausse =

Former France international rugby league footballer

Personal information
- Born: 21 March 1972 (age 53) Carcassonne, Aude, Occitania, France

Playing information
- Position: Wing
Club
Years	Team	Pld	T	G	FG	P
	AS Carcassonne
Representative
Years	Team	Pld	T	G	FG	P
1997–2001	France	7	1	0	0	4
- Source: As of 18 January 2021
- Father: Gilbert Benausse
- Relatives: René Benausse (uncle)

Patrice Benausse is a French rugby league footballer who represented France national rugby league team at the 2000 World Cup.

His father, Gilbert, and uncle, René, both also represented France.

== Playing career ==
Benausse played for the AS Carcassonne club. He made his debut for France in 1997 and later was part of the 2000 World Cup and 2001 tour of New Zealand and Papua New Guinea.
