= Pradelles-en-Val =

Part of Val-de-Dagne in Occitanie, France

- Part of Val-de-Dagne
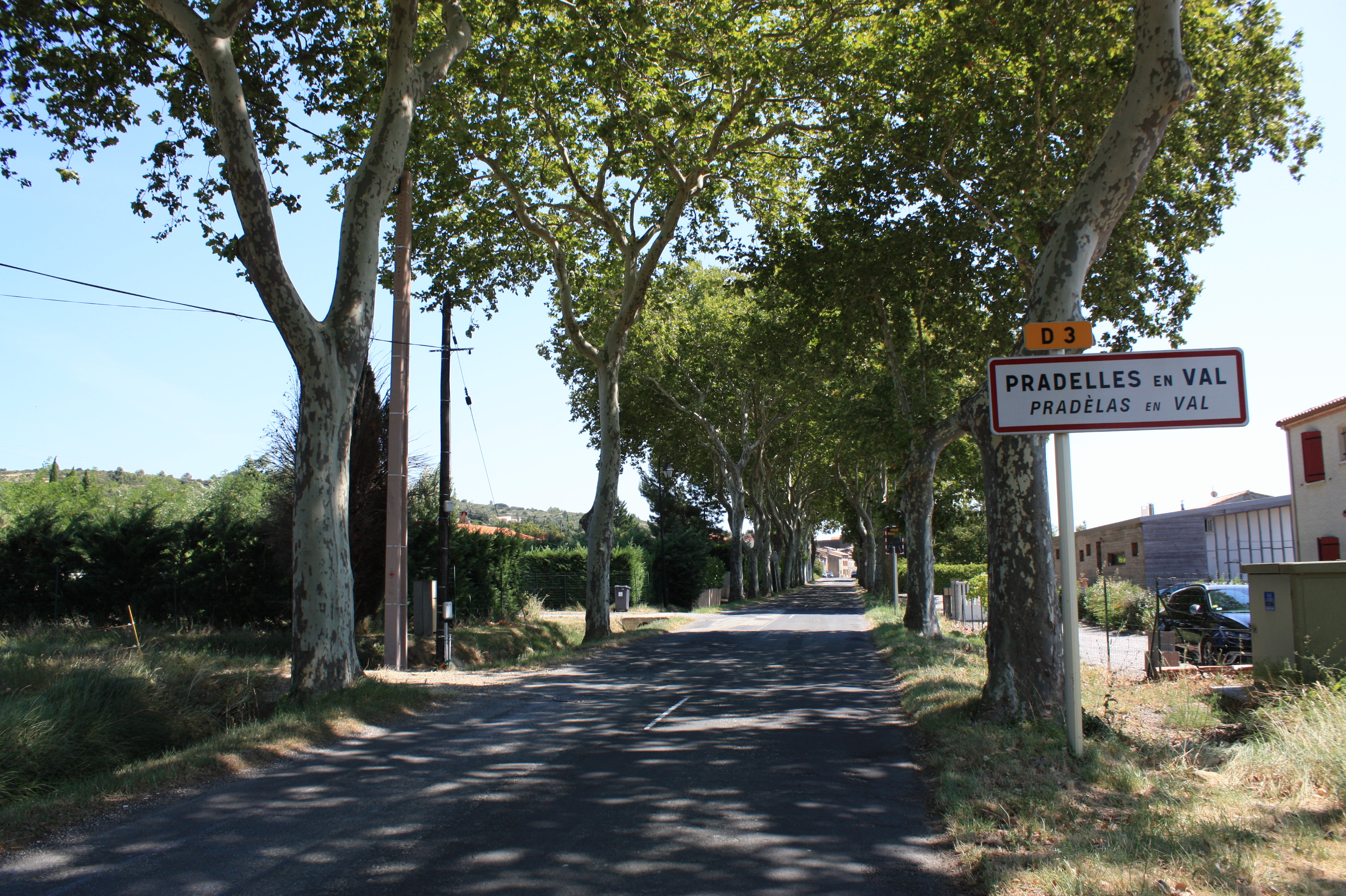
- Pradelles-en-Val - Entrée

- Coat of arms
- Location of Pradelles-en-Val
- Location within France Location within Occitanie
- Coordinates: 43°08′47″N 2°30′54″E
- Country: France
- Region: Occitania
- Department: Aude
- Arrondissement: Carcassonne
- Canton: La Montagne d'Alaric
- Commune: Val-de-Dagne
- Area^{1}: 16.19 km^{2} (6.25 sq mi)
- Elevation: 200 m (660 ft)
- Highest elevation: 500 m (1,600 ft)
- Lowest elevation: 180 m (590 ft)
- Population (2023): 191
  - Density: 11.8/km^{2} (30.6/sq mi)
- Time zone: UTC+01:00 (CET)
  - Summer (DST): UTC+02:00 (CEST)
- Postal code: 11220
- ^{1} French Land Register data, which excludes lakes, ponds, glaciers > 1 km^{2} (0.386 sq mi or 247 acres) and river estuaries.

Pradelles-en-Val (French pronunciation: [pʁadɛl ɑ̃ val]; Languedocien: Pradèlas en Val) is a former commune in the Aude department in southern France. On 1 January 2019, it was merged into the new commune Val-de-Dagne.

== See also ==
- Corbières AOC
- Communes of the Aude department
