= Luc Franco =

Spain international rugby league player (b.1998)

Personal information
- Full name: Luc Franco
- Born: 30 December 1998 (age 27) France,
- Height: 5 ft 9 in (1.75 m)
- Weight: 13 st 3 lb (84 kg)

Playing information
- Position: Fullback
Club
Years	Team	Pld	T	G	FG	P
2017–18	Limoux Grizzlies	9	9	2	1	40
2018–19	AS Carcassone	19	4	21	1	59
2019–21	Albi Tigers	16	3	26	1	65
2022–23	Limoux Grizzlies	0	0	0	0	0
2024–	Villeneuve Leopards	9	2	0	1	0
	Total	53	18	49	4	164
Representative
Years	Team	Pld	T	G	FG	P
2018–	Spain	5	3	1	0	14
- Source: As of 9 November 2026
- Relatives: Romain Franco (cousin)

Luc Franco (born 30 December 1998) is a Spanish international-French rugby league footballer currently playing for Villeneuve Leopards in the Elite One Championship. He is a fullback. He previously played for AS Carcassonne, Villeneuve Minervois XIII and Limoux Grizzlies.
