= Romain Franco =

France & Spain international rugby league player

Personal information
- Full name: Romain Franco
- Born: 5 June 1998 (age 28) France
- Height: 6 ft 1 in (1.85 m)
- Weight: 14 st 0 lb (89 kg)

Playing information
- Position: Wing
Club
Years	Team	Pld	T	G	FG	P
2017–23	Saint-Estève XIII Catalan	67	52	0	0	220
2021–22	Catalans Dragons	7	1	0	0	4
2023–24	Wakefield Trinity	9	7	0	0	28
2024(loan)	→ Bradford Bulls	4	3	0	0	12
2024–26	Racing Club Albi XIII	0	0	0	0	0
2026–	Limoux Grizzlies	0	0	0	0	0
	Total	87	63	0	0	264
Representative
Years	Team	Pld	T	G	FG	P
2019	Spain	2	1	0	0	4
2022	France B	1	0	0	0	0
2024	France	1	0	0	0	0
- Source: As of 9 November 2026
- Relatives: Luc Franco (cousin)

Romain Franco (born 5 June 1998) is a French rugby league footballer who plays as a winger for Limoux Grizzlies in the Super XIII.

== Playing career ==
=== Catalans Dragons ===
In 2021 he made his Catalans debut in the Super League against Hull Kingston Rovers.

=== Bradford Bulls (loan) ===
On 2 Aug 2024 it was reported that he had signed for Bradford Bulls in the RFL Championship on loan until the end of the 2024 season

=== Racing Club Albi XIII ===
On 7 Nov 2024 it was reported that he had signed for Racing Club Albi XIII in the Super XIII

=== Limoux Grizzlies ===
On 9 November 2026 it was reported that he had signed for Limoux Grizzlies in the Super XIII

== International ==
On 27 Oct 2024 it was reported that he made his début for France v Wales in the final European qualifier for the 2026 Rugby League World Cup
