= Villalier =

Commune in Occitanie, France

- Commune
- Coat of arms
- Location of Villalier
- Location within France Location within Occitanie
- Coordinates: 43°15′29″N 2°24′48″E
- Country: France
- Region: Occitania
- Department: Aude
- Arrondissement: Carcassonne
- Canton: La Vallée de l'Orbiel
- Intercommunality: Carcassonne Agglo

Government
  - Mayor (2020–2026): Michel Zoccarato
- Area^{1}: 7.7 km^{2} (3.0 sq mi)
- Elevation: 135 m (443 ft)
- Highest elevation: 151 m (495 ft)
- Lowest elevation: 87 m (285 ft)
- Population (2023): 972
  - Density: 130/km^{2} (330/sq mi)
- Time zone: UTC+01:00 (CET)
  - Summer (DST): UTC+02:00 (CEST)
- INSEE/Postal code: 11410 /11600
- ^{1} French Land Register data, which excludes lakes, ponds, glaciers > 1 km^{2} (0.386 sq mi or 247 acres) and river estuaries.

Villalier (French pronunciation: [vilalje]; Occitan: Vilalièr) is a commune in the Aude department in southern France.

== Population ==
Historical population
Year	Pop.	±% p.a.
1968	602	—
1975	643	+0.95%
1982	806	+3.28%
1990	923	+1.71%
1999	919	−0.05%
2007	819	−1.43%
2012	990	+3.87%
2017	1,004	+0.28%
2023	972	−0.54%
Source: INSEE

== See also ==
- Communes of the Aude department
