= Ugo Martin =

French rugby league footballer

Personal information
- Born: 5 November 1998 (age 27) Perpignan, Pyrénées-Orientales, Occitania, France

Playing information
- Position: Wing
Club
| Years | Team | Pld | T | G | FG | P |
|---|---|---|---|---|---|---|
| 2018–20 | Catalans Dragons | 1 | 0 | 0 | 0 | 0 |
| 2018–20(DR) | →Saint-Esteve Catalan | 11 | 5 | 0 | 0 | 20 |
| 2021– | Palau Broncos | 0 | 0 | 0 | 0 | 0 |
| | Total | 12 | 5 | 0 | 0 | 20 |
- Source: As of 21 July 2019

Ugo Martin (born 5 November 1998) is a French professional rugby league footballer who plays for Palau Broncos in the Elite One Championship. He was previously with Catalans Dragons in the Super League, as a wing.

In 2018 he made his Catalans debut in the Super League against the Warrington Wolves.
