= Montlaur, Aude =

Part of Val-de-Dagne in Occitanie, France

Montlaur
- Part of Val-de-Dagne
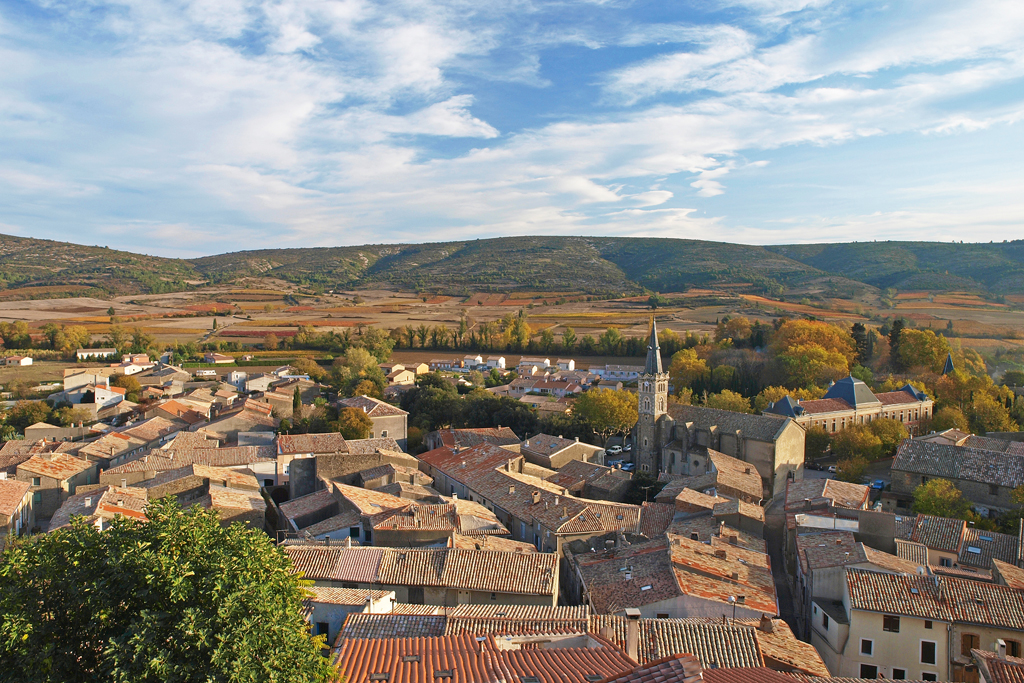
- View of Montlaur

- Coat of arms
- Location of Montlaur
- Location within France Location within Occitanie
- Coordinates: 43°07′50″N 2°33′31″E
- Country: France
- Region: Occitania
- Department: Aude
- Arrondissement: Carcassonne
- Canton: La Montagne d'Alaric
- Commune: Val-de-Dagne
- Area^{1}: 33.92 km^{2} (13.10 sq mi)
- Elevation: 208 m (682 ft)
- Highest elevation: 552 m (1,811 ft)
- Lowest elevation: 135 m (443 ft)
- Population (2023): 540
  - Density: 16/km^{2} (41/sq mi)
- Time zone: UTC+01:00 (CET)
  - Summer (DST): UTC+02:00 (CEST)
- Postal code: 11220
- ^{1} French Land Register data, which excludes lakes, ponds, glaciers > 1 km^{2} (0.386 sq mi or 247 acres) and river estuaries.

Montlaur (French pronunciation: [mɔ̃lɔʁ]) is a commune in the Aude department in southern France. On 1 January 2019, it was merged into the new commune Val-de-Dagne.

Montlaur village is located in a valley delimited by the Alaric mountain in the North and the Coque hill in the South.

== See also ==
- Corbières AOC
- Communes of the Aude department
