= Dean Bosnich =

Australian rugby league footballer

Personal information
- Full name: Dean Bosnich
- Born: 20 September 1980 (age 46) Sydney, New South Wales, Australia
- Height: 180 cm (5 ft 11 in)
- Weight: 100 kg (15 st 10 lb)

Playing information
- Position: Hooker, Second-row
Club
Years	Team	Pld	T	G	FG	P
2002–04	Cronulla-Sutherland	45	5	0	0	20
- Source: As of 15 November 2026

Dean Bosnich is an Australian former professional rugby league footballer who played in the 2000s for the Cronulla Sharks in the National Rugby League from 2002 until 2004. He is of Croatian heritage.

== Playing career ==
Bosnich made his debut in round 3 of the 2002 season against the Penrith Panthers. Bosnich played the majority of 2002 including the preliminary final defeat against New Zealand and the first half of 2003 off the Bench, however after the mid-season departure of Dean Treister to Hull FC he gained a starting position for part of the 2003 and 2004 NRL Seasons.

After being released by Cronulla Sharks, he joined French club Pia Donkeys in 2005, where he would spend five seasons.

== Post-playing career ==
In 2026 it was reported that he was the current NRL's general manager of game development
