= Paul Franze =

Former Italy international rugby league footballer

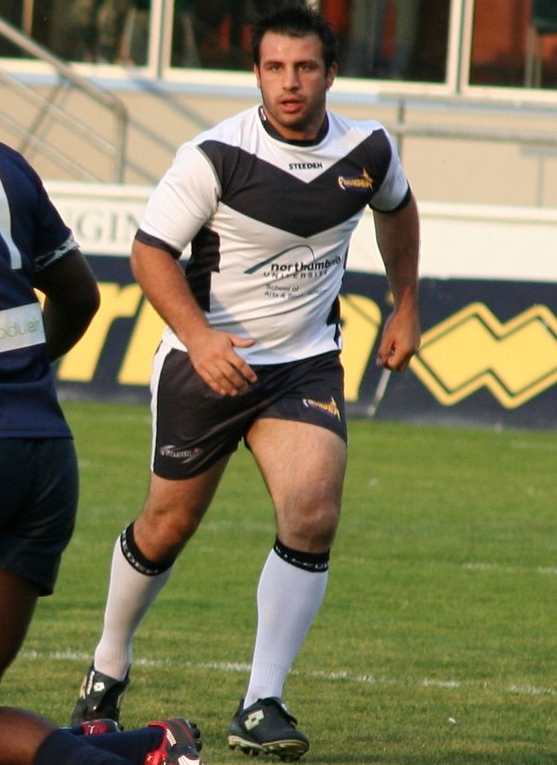

Personal information
- Full name: Paul Franze
- Born: 3 March 1982 (age 44) Newcastle, New South Wales, Australia

Playing information

Rugby league
- Position: Centre
Club
Years	Team	Pld	T	G	FG	P
2002–04	Cronulla Sharks	29	11	0	0	44
2005	Penrith Panthers	21	11	0	0	44
2006	Castleford Tigers	3	0	0	0	0
2007–09	Pia Donkeys	48	54	25	0	266
2009	Gateshead Thunder	15	12	0	0	48
	Total	116	88	25	0	402
Representative
Years	Team	Pld	T	G	FG	P
2004	Italy	1	3	1	0	14

Rugby union
Club
Years	Team	Pld	T	G	FG	P
2006	London Irish	7	3	2		19
- Source: As of 26 January 2021

Paul Franze (/frænzeɪ/) (born 3 March 1982) is a former professional rugby league and rugby union footballer. He played for the Cronulla-Sutherland Sharks and the Penrith Panthers in the NRL, and for the Castleford Tigers in the Super League, Gateshead Thunder in the Championship and Pia Donkeys in the Elite One Championship as well as a stint as a rugby union player for the London Irish in the Guinness Premiership. In both codes, Franze primarily played as a centre.

== Biography ==
=== Childhood and early career ===
Franze began playing rugby league in his home city of Newcastle for his local club, Raymond Terrace, while still at a young age. His talent was quickly spotted and he was signed by local NRL side the Newcastle Knights as a junior while still in his teens. His raw talent was also seen with his selection in the Junior Kangaroos Australian rugby league side. He went on to play in the lower grades but was never able to make his way into first grade until he was signed by the Cronulla-Sutherland Sharks.

=== 2002 ===
Franze began in the lower grades at the Cronulla-Sutherland Sharks rugby league club for the beginning of the 2002 season, though he quickly impressed his coach Chris Anderson and worked his way into the first grade side at Cronulla making his début in round six against the Newcastle Knights at EnergyAustralia Stadium on 19 April. Franze maintained his first grade spot for the remainder of the 2002 season, scoring eight tries including a double in the finals series against the St George Illawarra Dragons.

=== 2003-04 ===
The 2003 season was potentially shaping up to be an impressive one for Franze after a solid début season in first grade at the Sharks. However, early on during the Sharks' new season campaign, he sustained a season-ending knee injury, requiring him to have a knee reconstruction, and a lengthy recovery process meant he could take no further part in the season.

After recovering from his serious knee injury during the majority of the 2003 season, Franze made his return to the Sharks' first grade side midway through the 2004 season. However, he was never able to regain his old form and spent the majority of his time in reserve grade before being released from the club at the end of the season.

=== 2005 ===
Franze was signed by the Penrith Panthers at the beginning of the 2005 season and placed into the Panthers first grade team by coach John Lang, making his début in round one of the season in an eventual loss to his former club, the Sharks. Franze finished the season with eleven tries from twenty-one appearances.

Franze represented the Federazione Italiana Rugby League (FIRL) against the Greece Rugby League at Marconi Stadium - Sydney. This was Franze's first game for the Azzurri and scored 3 tries on debut.

At the end of the 2005 season with Franze being off contract, many English rugby union teams took an interest in him and he eventually decided to sign with the London Irish..

=== 2006 ===
Franze made his début for the London Irish rugby union club in the Guinness Premiership at the beginning of the 2006 season playing for the club at centre. He made the adjustment of switching codes quickly impressing fans and pundits alike with strong performances in several games including a superb try which many labelled the try of the season against Agen.

After making several appearances for his new club, Franze put in a request to his new club asking for his contract to be terminated so that he could return to rugby league. The request was granted by the London Irish rugby director Brian Smith.

After signing on to play rugby league again with the Castleford Tigers, Franze made his début for the club in their round nine clash against the Wakefield Trinity Wildcats on 14 April; He was named on the bench, eventually coming off to make his début late in the match. Franze went on to make another two appearances for the struggling Tigers before dramatically deciding to opt out of the remaining time on his contract, citing fatigue as this was the beginning of "his third straight season of rugby" without an off-season.

After terminating his contract with the Castleford team, Franze decided "to take a break from the game" for the time being.

Franze signed a two-year deal with the Newcastle Knights in July 2006.

=== 2007-09 ===
Franze signed with the Pia Donkeys in the French Rugby League at the end of 2007. He has now signed with the Gateshead Thunder. Franze left Gateshead Thunder at the end of the 2009 Season following the club entering administration.

== Career playing statistics ==
=== Matches played ===
Team	Matches	Years
Cronulla-Sutherland Sharks	29	2002–2004
Penrith Panthers	21	2005
London Irish	7	2006
Castleford Tigers	3	2006
Pia Donkeys	48	2007–2009
Gateshead Thunder	15	2009
Total	123	2002–2009

== Notes ==
1. "London Irish win race to sign NRL star Franze", RFU, retrieved 23 June 2006
2. " New signing Franze quits Tigers", BBC Sport, retrieved 23 June 2006
3. "Paul Franze returns to Rugby League", News London Irish, retrieved 23 June 2006
4. "Greece Awaits". Angelfire.
