= Villetritouls =

Commune in Occitanie, France

- Commune
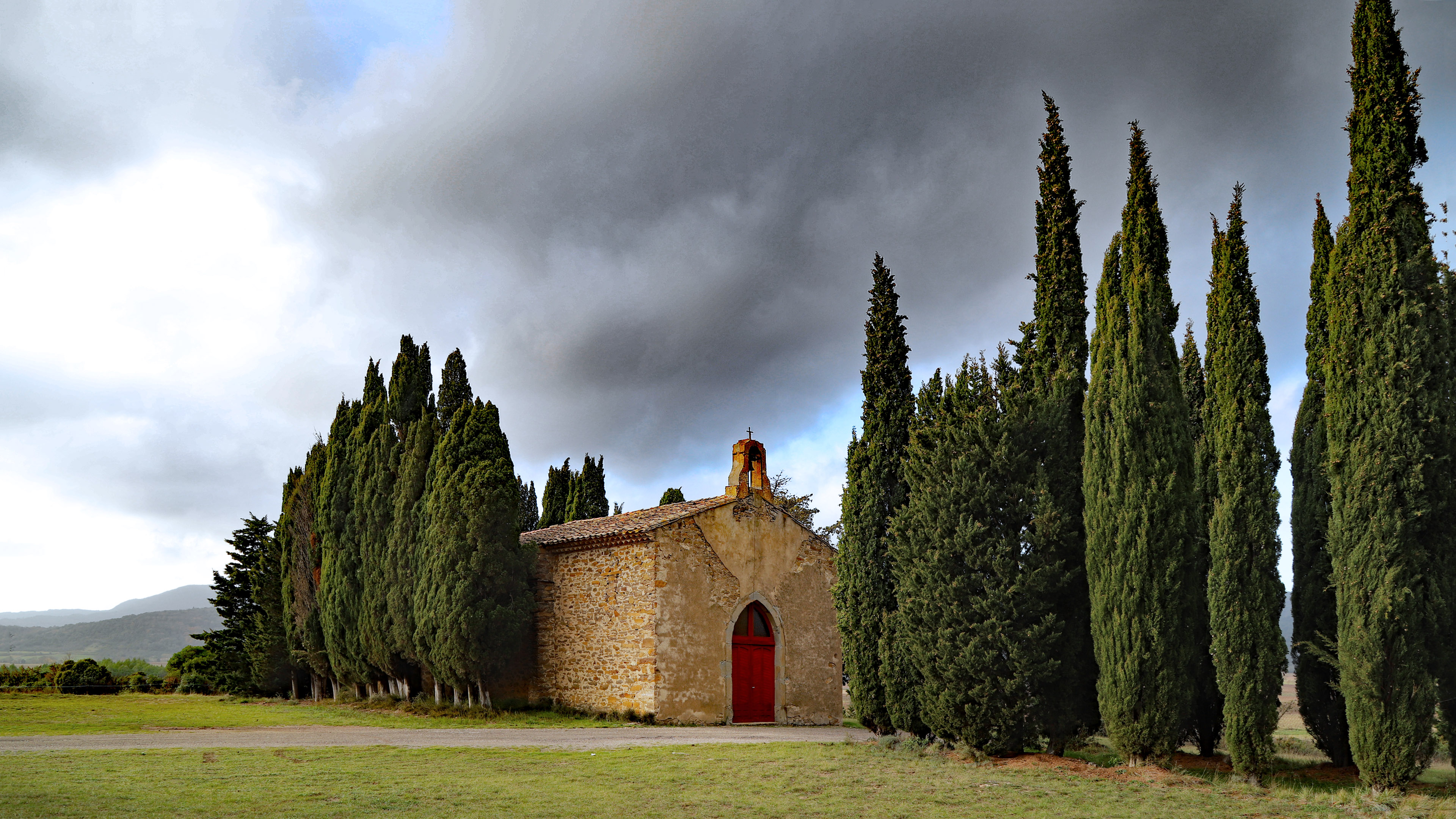
- Chapelle Cambourras Villetritouls

- Coat of arms
- Location of Villetritouls
- Location within France Location within Occitanie
- Coordinates: 43°04′54″N 2°29′29″E
- Country: France
- Region: Occitania
- Department: Aude
- Arrondissement: Carcassonne
- Canton: La Montagne d'Alaric
- Intercommunality: Carcassonne Agglo

Government
  - Mayor (2020–2026): Jacques Cachoux
- Area^{1}: 4.88 km^{2} (1.88 sq mi)
- Elevation: 225 m (738 ft)
- Highest elevation: 667 m (2,188 ft)
- Lowest elevation: 200 m (660 ft)
- Population (2023): 34
  - Density: 7.0/km^{2} (18/sq mi)
- Time zone: UTC+01:00 (CET)
  - Summer (DST): UTC+02:00 (CEST)
- INSEE/Postal code: 11440 /11220
- ^{1} French Land Register data, which excludes lakes, ponds, glaciers > 1 km^{2} (0.386 sq mi or 247 acres) and river estuaries.

Villetritouls is a commune in the Aude department in southern France.

== Population ==
Historical population
Year	Pop.	±% p.a.
1968	40	—
1975	23	−7.60%
1982	26	+1.77%
1990	28	+0.93%
1999	33	+1.84%
2007	40	+2.43%
2012	36	−2.09%
2017	38	+1.09%
2023	34	−1.84%
Source: INSEE

== See also ==
- Corbières AOC
- Communes of the Aude department
