= Elite One Championship 2019–2020 =

Elite One Championship 2019-2020
- League: Elite One Championship
- Teams: 10

2019–20

The 2019–20 Elite One Championship was the 85th season of France's domestic rugby league competition and the 19th season known as the Elite One Championship. There were ten teams in the league. Each team was to 19 matches in the regular season and the top six teams progressed to the finals series.

On 14 April 2020, due to the COVID-19 pandemic in France, the season was declared null and void.

== Ladder ==
| Pos | Team | Pld | W | D | L | PF | PA | Pts |
|---|---|---|---|---|---|---|---|---|
| 1 | Limoux Grizzlies | 12 | 10 | 0 | 2 | 378 | 182 | 33 |
| 2 | Saint-Estève XIII Catalan | 12 | 8 | 0 | 4 | 336 | 248 | 28 |
| 3 | Albi RL | 12 | 9 | 0 | 3 | 318 | 244 | 28 |
| 4 | Lézignan Sangliers | 12 | 7 | 0 | 5 | 346 | 264 | 24 |
| 5 | Villeneuve XIII RLLG | 11 | 7 | 0 | 4 | 344 | 254 | 23 |
| 6 | Sporting Olympique Avignon | 12 | 6 | 0 | 6 | 306 | 271 | 22 |
| 7 | AS Carcassonne | 11 | 4 | 0 | 7 | 255 | 261 | 17 |
| 8 | Saint-Gaudens Bears | 11 | 4 | 0 | 7 | 234 | 312 | 14 |
| 9 | Palau XIII Broncos | 11 | 3 | 0 | 8 | 276 | 307 | 13 |
| 10 | Toulouse Olympique Broncos | 12 | 0 | 0 | 12 | 148 | 598 | -1 |

== See also ==
- Rugby league in France
