= FC Lézignan XIII =

French semi-professional rugby league club

FC Lézignan

Club information
- Full name: Football Club; Lézignan-Corbières Rugby League
- Nickname: Sangliers (Boars)
- Colours: white, green and red
- Founded: 1903; 123 years ago
- Website: Official site

Current details
- Ground: Stade du Moulin (6,000)
- Chairman: Alain Fabre, Christian Lapalu
- Coach: Rémi Casty
- Competition: Super XIII
- 2025-26: 8th

Uniforms
Home colours

The Football Club Lézignan-Corbières Rugby League, commonly known as FC Lézignan or Feuceuleu, is a French rugby league club based in Lézignan-Corbières, in the Aude department of southern France. Founded in 1903 as a rugby union club, it quickly established itself among the leading teams in French rugby, reaching the final of the French Championship in 1929. In 1939, the club switched to rugby league and subsequently joined the sport's competitions after the Second World War. It plays its home matches at the Stade du Moulin and wears green and white.

FC Lézignan is one of the most successful clubs in French rugby league, having won numerous domestic titles. Its honours include several French Championships and Lord Derby Cup titles, with particularly successful periods during the 1960s and again in the 2000s and 2010s.

Throughout its history, the club has fielded numerous French internationals and developed several generations of prominent players, including Édouard Ponsinet, Gilbert Benausse and Michel Maïque. It remains a leading contender in the Super XIII, regularly competing near the top of the standings alongside traditional rivals such as AS Carcassonne, XIII Limouxin and Villeneuve XIII. The club is coached the 2026-27 season by Rémi Casty.

== History ==
In 1893 Joseph Anglade a university professor practised a game called football with students on a ground they called 'Belle Isle'. The game was a mixture of football and rugby, very similar to what is now 'Australian Football' On the back of this a student called Lucien Mountain in 1903 founded the original rugby club 'Football Club Lezignanais'. In 1919 after 14 years playing in the hospital grounds the club moved their own ground to the Stade du Moulin then called the Stadium of the Mill. In 1921 the club competed in the French Rugby Union Championship for the first time and in 1929 they reached the final but were beaten by US Quillan. Disheartened by rugby in France at this time the club was dissolved in 1931 after they had been threatened with a ban from entering the competition due to financial payments.

On 2 August 1939 the new 'Lezignan' club joined Rugby league and participated in the 1939/40 season, unfortunately this would be the last one before war broke out. During the war the Vichy Government banned the sport and made players play union, after the war the club resumed playing Rugby League. The revival of the club began in 1954 with the appointment of Edouard Ponsinet as captain-coach and of the arrival of new president Me Fau. They won their first junior title, then in 1960 the club won their first major trophy winning the Lord Derby Cup under André Carrère. The following season the Sangliers lifted the French Rugby League Championship for the first time beating Roanne XIII in the final. In 1963 they won their second title, with the juniors doing even better as they completed a league and cup double. Two more cup wins followed for the first team in 1966 and 1970.

During the 70s the club under Michel Maïque produced a host of excellent young and local players culminating in a 1978 title win over XIII Catalan in which 12 of the starting lie up were from their own youth team. There were also near misses as they were runners up three times in the cup 1971, 74 and 78 and in the league in 76. It was during this era that one of their best players emerged in Pierre Lacaze nicknamed 'The Butterfly'. There then followed a very long barren spell in terms of success, 30 years, until they won the league title in 2008. There then followed a spell of dominance from the club in which they won 4 straight titles and two cup wins resulting in two consecutive double campaigns in 2010 and 2011. In 2015 they won the Lord Derby Cup for a sixth time beating St Esteve XIII Catalan in the final. Season 2016/17 brought delight in finishing top of the table but disappointment in losing both the league play-off final against Limoux Grizzlies and the Lord Derby Cup final against AS Carcassonne.

== Colours and badge ==
'Lezignan play in white green and pink of various design. The badge depicts a windmill that is still present at the site.

== Stadium ==
The earliest reference to rugby being played in Lezignan came in 1893 when students played at a place called 'Belle Isle' on the 'Route de Cruscades. Between 1905 and 1919 rugby was played in the grounds of the hospital at the front of the building named as 'Jardins de Blasco' it had one wooden stand, that was stripped away during the war. In 1919 Lezignan president Gustave Gayraud acquired land from the County of Kerouartz to use as a rugby ground. On the land was a vineyard, two mills, one water the other wind, and a small stream, the windmill is now just ruins but the watermill still stands. The first match played at the Stade du Moulin was in October 1919 v Stade Toulousain, the supporters themselves built the first dressing rooms. Over the years work has been done to the ground with a major overhaul done in 2000 following devastating floods the year before. The current capacity is 6,000. On 3 July 2001 the ground hosted its first full international when Scotland won against France 42-20

== Current squad ==
Squad for the 2026-2027 Super XIII season.

- (France) Evan Albert (Lock)
- (France) Lilian Albert (Prop)
- (Australia) Max Bailey (Prop)
- (France) Terry Bautheas (Prop)
- (Australia) Joseph Besgrove (Hooker)
- (France) Mathias Bousquet (Centre)
- (France) Vincent Calvayrac (Hooker)
- (France) Bruno Castany (Five-eighth)
- (France) Valentin Cols
- (France) Sascha Dumontet (Wing)
- (France) Thibault Franck (Halfback)
- (Australia) Matt French (Prop)
- (France) Hugo Garcia (Prop)
- (France) Etienne Gayraud (Second-row)
- (Poland) Callum Gromek (Fullback)
- (France) Mateo Lacans (Hooker)
- (France) Luka Lemaitre
- (France) Pierre Monteil (Halfback)
- (France) Eddy Perramond (Prop)
- (France) Robin Petrequin
- (France) Paul Reverdy (Second-row)
- (France) Arthur Salles (Centre)
- (France) Loic Taurin (Centre)
- (France) Loris Zammut (Wing)

== Honours ==
Rugby league
French Championship	Lord Derby Cup	French Second Division Championship
Champions (8): 1961, 1963, 1978, 2008, 2009, 2010, 2011 and 2021.; Runners-up (5): 1959, 1976, 2007, 2014 and 2017.	Winners (6): 1960, 1966, 1970, 2010, 2011 and 2015.; Runners-up (8): 1961, 1971, 1974, 1978, 1999, 2006, 2017 and 2024.	Winners (0): None.; Runners-up (1): 1991.

Rugby union
French Championship	French Second Division Championship
Champions (0): None.; Runners-up (1): 1929.	Winners (0): None.; Runners-up (1): 1933.
