= Joseph Crespo =

Former France international rugby league footballer

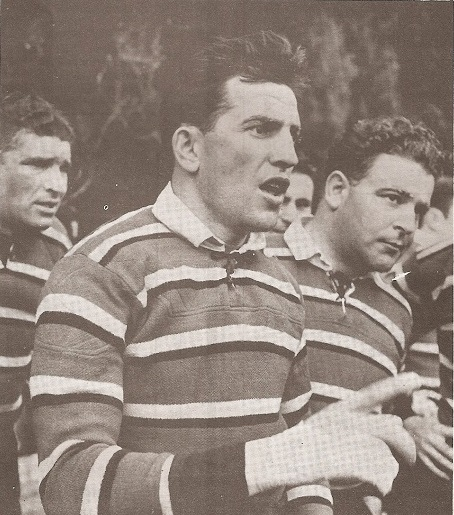

Personal information
- Full name: Joseph Édouard Casimir Crespo
- Born: 1 January 1925 Elne, France
- Died: 7 May 2004 (aged 79) Mably, France

Playing information

Rugby league
- Position: Centre, Scrum-half, Five-eighth
Club
Years	Team	Pld	T	G	FG	P
1945–49	RC Roanne
1949–55	US Lyon-Villeurbanne
	Total	0	0	0	0	0
Representative
Years	Team	Pld	T	G	FG	P
1948–54	France	28	12	1	0	38

Rugby union
Club
Years	Team	Pld	T	G	FG	P
1941–44	USA Perpignan

Joseph Crespo, nicknamed Monsieur Jo, born on 1 January 1925 in Elne (Pyrénées-Orientales) and died on 7 May 2004 in Mably (Loire), was a French rugby union player and French international rugby league player who played as a scrum-half, five-eighth or centre.

Raised in Perpignan, he began playing rugby union at the local Avenir Sportif Perpignanais club alongside a player named Puig-Aubert, before both joined USA Perpignan. Crespo won the French junior championship in 1943 and then the senior French championship in 1944, playing in a Perpignan team that included Joseph Desclaux, Puig-Aubert and Frédéric Trescases. They defeated Aviron Bayonnais, featuring Jean Dauger, by a score of 20–5.

Rugby league re-emerged in France in 1944 following its ban during the Second World War. Crespo, like many players from Perpignan such as Henri Riu, switched to rugby league and joined RC Roanne XIII, led by Claudius Devernois, in 1945. At Roanne, alongside René Duffort, with whom he perfected the cross-pass, he won the French championship twice, in 1947 and 1948. He then joined US Lyon-Villeurbanne, winning two further titles in 1951 and 1955, together with two French Cup titles in 1953 and 1954.

A leading scrum-half in the French championship, equally capable of playing successfully at stand-off or centre, he also earned 28 caps for the French national team, taking part in its European Rugby League Championship title wins in 1949, 1951 and 1952, the 1951 tour of Australia and New Zealand, and the final of the Rugby League World Cup in 1954.

== Biography ==
=== Childhood, youth and successful beginnings in rugby union at Perpignan ===
Joseph Édouard Casimir Crespo was born on 1 January 1925 in Elne (Pyrénées-Orientales). His father, Second Crespo (born in Beneixama, Spain, on 8 March 1894 and naturalised as a French citizen in 1937), was a chauffeur, while his mother, Françoise Cabot (born in Collioure on 14 July 1896 and died in Perpignan in 1983), had no occupation. He had a brother, René (1919–2009). Crespo married Suzanne Marcel (born in Roanne in 1927), with whom he had three daughters: Françoise, Josette and Catherine.

1944 French Championship title with USA Perpignan
USA Perpignan 20–5 Aviron Bayonnais
USA Perpignan team:

Louis Carrère, Albert Conte, Michel Trilles, Lucien Barris, Ambroise Ulma, Jacques Palat, Jean Barande, Marcel Blanc – Joseph Crespo (scrum-half), Hubert Marty (fly-half) – Fernand Got, Jean Teulière, Joseph Desclaux, Frédéric Trescazes, Puig Aubert

Born in Elne, Joseph Crespo took up rugby union at a very young age. He moved to the railway station district of Perpignan and joined the Avenir Sportif Perpignanais club in 1940, where he met Gaston Comes and a player named Puig-Aubert. The latter and Crespo subsequently joined the city's leading club, USA Perpignan. Playing above his age category, he quickly joined the first team while continuing to play for the juniors. At scrum-half, he won the Coupe Frantz-Reichel (French under-21 championship) in 1943 and then, as a starting player in the Perpignan first team, won the French Championship in 1944. The final, played in Paris at the Parc des Princes, saw the Catalans defeat Aviron Bayonnais, featuring Jean Dauger and Jean Dubalen, 20–5.

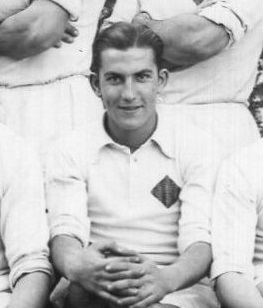
Joseph Crespo wearing the USA Perpignan jersey in 1944.

The Perpignan team included many junior players who would go on to distinguish themselves in postwar rugby. Crespo stood out at scrum-half and was considered one of rugby's great prospects. Alongside him, under the guidance of the experienced captain Joseph Desclaux, were Louis Carrère, Lucien Barris, Ambroise Ulma, Marcel Blanc, Frédéric Trescazes and Puig Aubert.

In June 1944, his progress was interrupted: he was caught in a roundup in Perpignan and sent to Germany for a year under the Compulsory Work Service (STO). He worked for the Gutehoffnungshütte company in Oberhausen.

=== 1945: Switch to rugby league and emergence as a leading player for RC Roanne and France ===
==== 1945–1946: Joining the great RC Roanne team ====
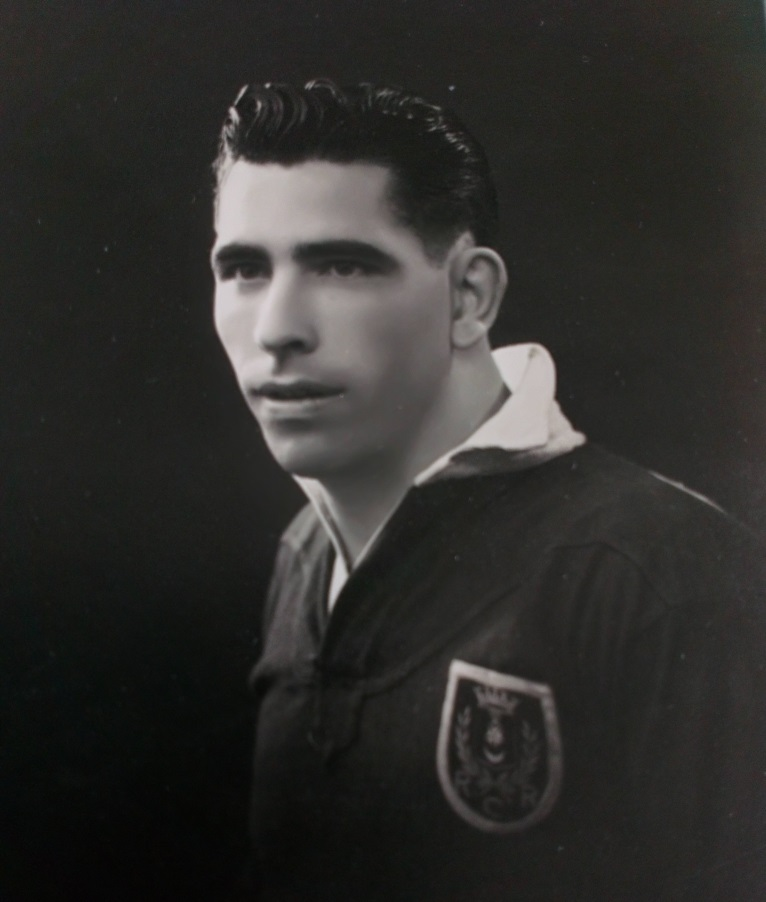
Henri Riu acted as Joseph Crespo's mentor upon his arrival at RC Roanne.

Upon his return from the Compulsory Work Service (STO), at the end of the Second World War, rugby league was revived after having been banned by the Vichy regime, with the support of the rugby union authorities. To revive the sport, rugby league officials began recruiting the best young rugby players. Having distinguished himself in the colours of USA Perpignan, Crespo was among those who crossed the divide between the two codes: he signed for RC Roanne, in the Loire department, a club revived by businessman Claudius Devernois, while also working for the Devernois company. Crespo was accompanied in his switch to rugby league by his Perpignan teammate Henri Riu, who acted as his mentor. RC Roanne had been one of the most prestigious clubs before the war, winning the French Rugby League Championship in 1939 with players including René Arotça, Jean Dauger and Max Rousié.

Joseph Crespo was not the only high-profile recruit to this team, which quickly established itself as one of the leading contenders in the French Championship. Coached by Jean Duhau, the team included Pierre Taillantou, Robert Joly, the Catalan players Riu, Élie Brousse and Gaston Comes, fullback Jean Barreteau, and several returning pre-war players: Robert Dauger (brother of Jean Dauger), Vincent Martimpé-Gallart and Henri Gibert.

During that season, Crespo was unable to fully demonstrate his talent in the spring, as injuries kept him off the field for more than two months between February and April 1946, preventing him from taking part in the semi-finals. RC Roanne reached the semi-finals of both the French Championship and the French Cup, but were defeated at that stage by AS Carcassonne 15–3 and XIII Catalan 8–7, respectively.

==== 1946–1947: First French Championship title ====
During the 1946–1947 season, the Roanne team was strengthened by the arrival of René Duffort. Together, the two players would go on to achieve some of the great feats of postwar rugby league and skilfully perfected the cross-pass that made them famous. Coach Jean Duhau, who had been called upon to build RC Marseille for Paul Ricard, was replaced by former international player Robert Samatan. Crespo was entrusted with the scrum-half position, although he was also selected several times at centre or on the wing during the season.

First French Championship title in 1947
RC Roanne 19–0 AS Carcassonne
RC Roanne team:

Jean Barreteau – Joseph Crespo, Charles Rabier, Gaston Comes, René Dadies – Pierre Taillantou (stand-off), Roger Pouy (scrum-half) – Henri Riu, Vincent Martimpé-Gallart, Henri Gibert, Élie Brousse, Lucien Barris, René Duffort

Coach: Robert Samatan

Throughout the season, Samatan never fielded the same starting line-up, preferring to switch players between positions in order to surprise their opponents tactically. Thus, Crespo, who had been trained as a scrum-half since his junior years, was sometimes moved to the wing while Pouy took over at scrum-half. Despite these changes, which even confused Roanne's own supporters, RC Roanne enjoyed an excellent season, remaining among the leading teams in the Championship standings throughout the campaign. Crespo finally completed a full season and firmly established himself as a regular starter in Roanne's thirteen. He was, for example, one of the key contributors to his team's victory over XIII Catalan in the round of 16 of the French Cup.

Having finished top of the regular-season standings in the Championship, RC Roanne qualified for the final and was able to watch its opponents compete in the play-offs. Puig-Aubert's AS Carcassonne emerged victorious from these encounters, eliminating FC Lézignan and then Bordeaux-Bayonne. Although they had not finished first in the regular season, defending champions AS Carcassonne were considered favourites against RC Roanne.

The final, played at the municipal stadium in Lyon, brought together the two best teams of the season, both featuring numerous French internationals. RC Roanne produced a perfect performance against an ineffective and uninspired Carcassonne side, just one week after the latter had won the French Cup. In a match that ended 19–0, with thirteen points scored by Gaston Comes, who was named man of the match, Crespo, playing on the wing and contributing more in defence than in attack, nevertheless managed to score one of Roanne's tries and distinguished himself during the match despite receiving few good passes.

After the final whistle, he and his teammates Barreteau, Duffort and Taillantou carried their captain Pouy shoulder-high in celebration. This was Crespo's first French rugby league championship title, having previously won the French rugby union championship in 1944 with USA. Perpignan.

==== 1947–1948: Second French Championship title and first international caps ====
First appearance for France on 25 January 1948 against New Zealand
France 25–7 New Zealand
France team:

Puig Aubert – Odé Lepes, Jep Maso, Louis Llari, Paul Déjean – Robert Caillou (stand-off), Joseph Crespo (scrum-half) – Édouard Ponsinet, Henri Durand, André Béraud, Gabriel Berthomieu, Lucien Barris, Gaston Calixte

For the 1947–1948 season, Robert Samatan was retained as coach, but Gaston Comes and Élie Brousse had left the club. Joseph Crespo, meanwhile, remained one of the indispensable members of RC Roanne due to his versatility, preferring the scrum-half position but performing equally well at centre and on the wing. He could also fill in at stand-off in the absence of Pierre Taillantou. Roanne were contenders to retain their title, with AS Carcassonne and RC Marseille as their main rivals.

In January 1948, during the New Zealand team's tour of Europe, Crespo played in representative matches, first for the French Catalans and then for a Lyonnais regional selection. Thanks to these two strong performances, he distinguished himself and emerged as a serious contender for selection to the French national team. He also reaffirmed that scrum-half was his preferred position, considering that it was where he could "perform at his best and [feel] most comfortable". His first international cap was confirmed a few days before the match against New Zealand: he was paired in the halves with the experienced Robert Caillou and selected ahead of his club teammate René Duffort, who was recovering from a sprained ankle. Despite a convincing victory, Crespo did not produce the performance expected of him, but took his first steps in the French national team, for which he continued to play until 1954.

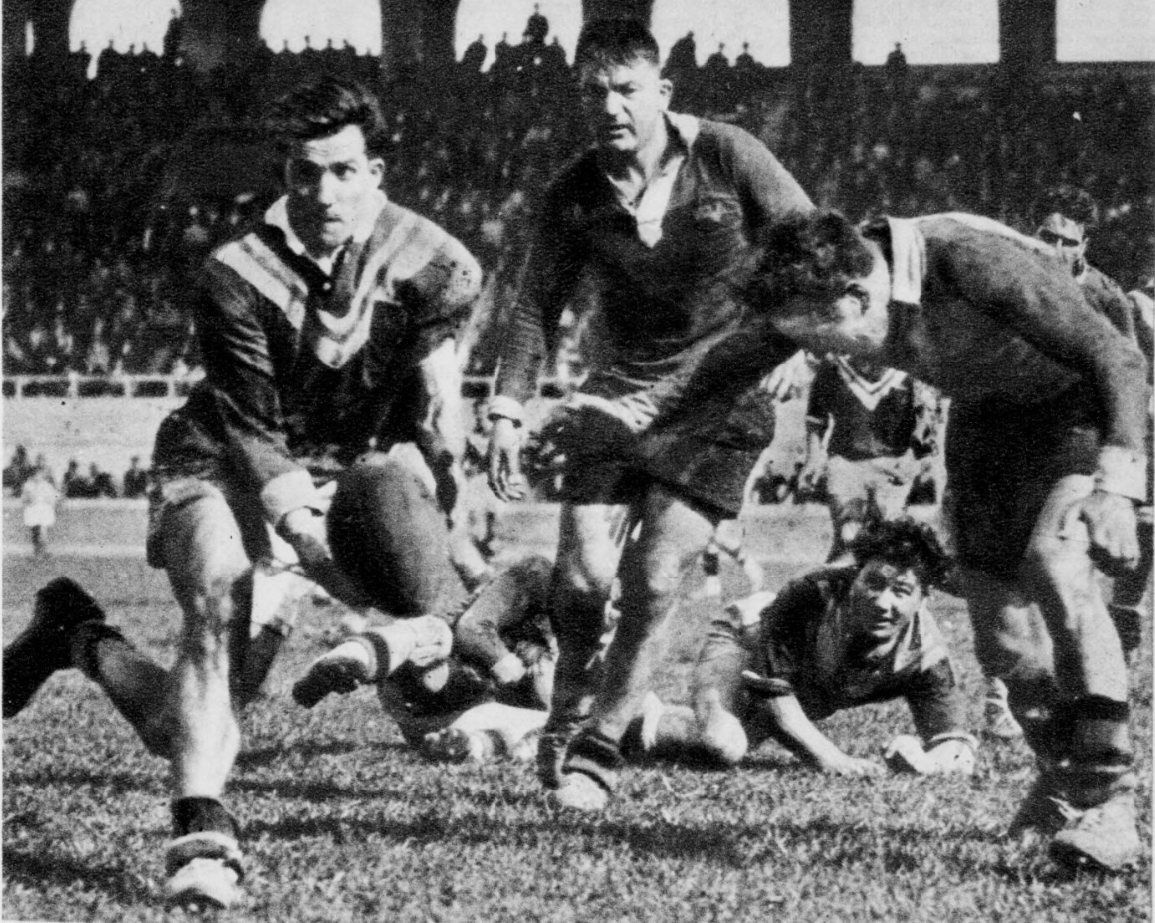
Joseph Crespo in possession of the ball against Carcassonne players Jean Poch and Édouard Ponsinet.

Selected for the France–Wales match in March 1948, he withdrew due to a separation of the shoulder muscles, but regained his place for the France–England match held at the Stade Vélodrome in Marseille in April. This match determined the winner of the 1948 European Championship. Paired with Pierre Taillantou in the halves, Crespo failed to produce a high-level performance, with ineffective passing to his stand-off, and France were defeated 25–10 by an England team led by scrum-half Thomas Bradshaw, who got the better of Crespo.

Second French Championship title in 1948
RC Roanne 3–2 AS Carcassonne
RC Roanne team:

Jean Barreteau – Raymond Contrastin, Alain Vernis, Joseph Crespo, Roger Pouy – Pierre Taillantou (stand-off), René Duffort (scrum-half) – Robert Abadié, Vincent Martimpé-Gallart, Lucien Barris, Henri Riu, André Tardif, Robert Dauger

Coach: Robert Samatan

At club level, however, Crespo produced a series of fine performances towards the end of the Championship season, while RC Roanne were eliminated in the quarter-finals of the French Cup by AS Carcassonne, a match he missed because of his shoulder injury in late March 1948. Having finished second in the regular-season standings behind AS Carcassonne, RC Roanne faced RC Marseille in the semi-finals, one week after the match against England. The victory over Marseille, in which Crespo scored a try, was secured by a score of 16–11, and for the second consecutive year the French Championship final brought together AS Carcassonne and RC Roanne.

The final took place at the Stade Vélodrome in Marseille. Crespo played at centre and on the wing, alternating positions with Roger Pouy, leaving the Duffort–Taillantou partnership in the halves for Roanne. Playing against the wind in the first half, RC Roanne came under sustained pressure from Carcassonne, who controlled the match but were unable to score. Crespo also made a crucial defensive intervention during the first half, blocking the path of Frédéric Trescazes, who, while heading towards the try line, passed the ball to Jep Maso, who failed to hold on to it. AS Carcassonne led only 2–0 at half-time thanks to a drop goal by Puig-Aubert, before having to play against the wind in the second half. This allowed RC Roanne to turn the match around, with a try by Taillantou in the 56th minute establishing the final score. RC Roanne and Crespo celebrated their second consecutive French Championship title.

==== 1948–1949: Winner of the European Championship with France ====
The 1948–1949 season proved more difficult for RC Roanne due to injuries affecting several players, particularly Robert Dauger, René Duffort and Roger Pouy, forcing coach Robert Samatan to constantly change his starting thirteen, as well as the departure of several talented players, including Raymond Contrastin, Henri Gibert and Lucien Barris.

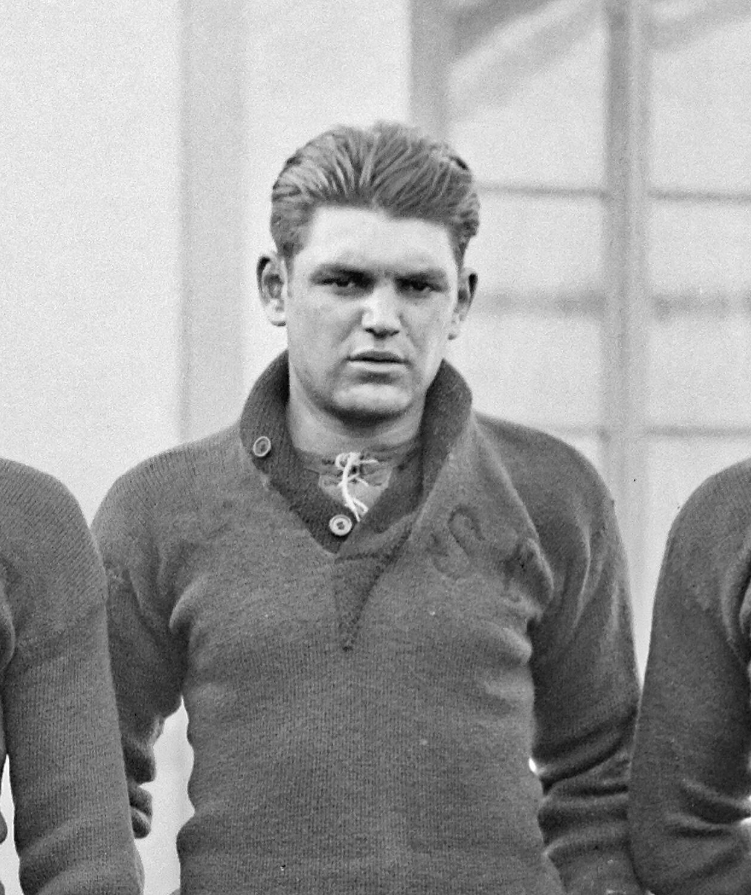
Jean Duhau, coach of the France national rugby league team, selected Crespo on numerous occasions.

At international level, Crespo faced competition from the emerging Marseille scrum-half Jean Dop and did not take part in France's victory over Wales in October 1948, on the opening matchday of the 1948–49 European Championship. Crespo benefited from injuries to several players, including Dop, for the following match against England. He was paired with Duffort in the halves for this encounter. France led 5–2 until the 77th minute, before England turned the match around with two tries to win 12–5. Despite this defeat, and in the absence of Puig-Aubert, Crespo was named among the best players in the match, outshining his opposite number Gerry Helme and providing the decisive pass for the French try scored by Odé Lepes. This match firmly established Crespo in the French national team, with his performance praised by his opponents, teammates and observers, including William Fallowfield, who expressed his astonishment.

Following this international match, Crespo maintained his outstanding form, establishing himself as one of the best players in the Championship and being described as the player who directed Roanne's game. He demonstrated and confirmed his form in mid-December 1948 by helping Roanne defeat RC Marseille 7–6, being named man of the match and inflicting Marseille's first defeat of the season. His deployment at centre, decided by his Roanne coach Samatan, offered the French national team a genuine opportunity, as Crespo proved particularly effective in that position. His versatility worked in his favour, and he was now regarded by the French team management and observers as the spark that the national side had been missing. France coach Jean Duhau confirmed this impression, declaring that "Crespo may well deserve first place in the ranking of French centres and is undoubtedly the best French scrum-half".

The end of 1948 and the beginning of 1949 were marked by the tour of the Australian national team in France. At Christmas 1948, the Australians first faced the French Catalans representative side, a match in which Crespo was unable to participate because of opposition from his Roanne club president, Claudius Devernois. The Catalans, led by Paul Dejean, won 20–5. However, for the two matches between France and Australia in January 1949, Crespo was selected to start at centre ahead of Gaston Comes. In these two encounters, France were first defeated 29–10 at the Stade Vélodrome in Marseille, then 10–0 at Parc Lescure in Bordeaux. Crespo was one of only five French players to take part in both matches, but like his teammates, he admitted being powerless against the Australians. In early March, during a season in which everything seemed to be going his way, he married Suzanne Marcel, a woman from Roanne.

In the European Championship, France had two matches remaining: first an away match against England at Wembley Stadium, followed by a home match against Wales at the Stade Vélodrome. Two victories would allow the French national team to lift the trophy for the first time since the end of the Second World War. Crespo was selected at scrum-half for the first encounter, partnering the stand-off Charles Galaup from Albi. In a sparsely attended Wembley Stadium, with nearly 15,000 spectators, the French forwards were the outstanding players in a match that saw France win 12–5, avenging their defeat against the same opponents in Bordeaux. Neither Crespo nor Galaup was particularly prominent during the match, although the former was described as highly intelligent by the sporting press and provided the decisive pass for one of Puig-Aubert's three match-winning drop goals. It was a remarkable achievement for France, who had not defeated England since 25 February 1939. The following weekend, Crespo helped RC Roanne win their round-of-16 match against XIII Catalan in the French Cup, before preparing for the decisive European Championship match against Wales.

First European Championship title in 1949
France 11–0 Wales
France team:

Puig Aubert – Odé Lepes, Joseph Crespo, Paul Dejean, Vincent Cantoni – Charles Galaup (stand-off), Roger Guilhem (scrum-half) – Gaston Calixte, Gabriel Berthomieu, Édouard Ponsinet, Paul Bartoletti, Martin Martin, Ambroise Ulma

At the Stade Vélodrome, France faced Wales on 10 April 1949. The Welsh had also defeated England in February and could prevent France from lifting the trophy. Nearly 30,000 spectators attended the match. France coach Jean Duhau decided to retain Roger Guilhem at scrum-half and placed Crespo at centre alongside his friend Paul Dejean, where he proved equally effective. Against a combative and foul-playing Welsh side that dominated the opening ten minutes, Crespo was instrumental in creating France's first try, passing to Dejean, who then released Vincent Cantoni to score after breaking through the defence. The match ended 11–0, with three tries scored. Crespo and his teammates celebrated the occasion with a lap of honour, following a minute's silence in memory of Jean Galia, who had died in January 1949, and a rendition of La Marseillaise.

In the French Championship and the French Cup, RC Roanne entered the closing stages of the season as contenders for both titles. With Jep Maso in their ranks, Roanne nevertheless lost 21–6 to AS Carcassonne in the French Cup semi-final at the Parc des Princes in Paris, in a match during which the Roanne side were at times reduced to ten players because of injuries to Jean Barreteau, Rodeila and others. The following week, RC Roanne faced RC Marseille in the Championship semi-final. Samatan positioned Crespo on the wing despite his limited experience in that position. The Marseille side, in outstanding form and inspired by their halves partnership of Jean Dop and Paul Césard, inflicted a crushing 22–0 defeat on a Roanne team that produced its worst performance of the season.

=== 1949: Joseph Crespo joins US Lyon-Villeurbanne and also enjoys international success with France ===
==== 1949: Move to US Lyon-Villeurbanne ====
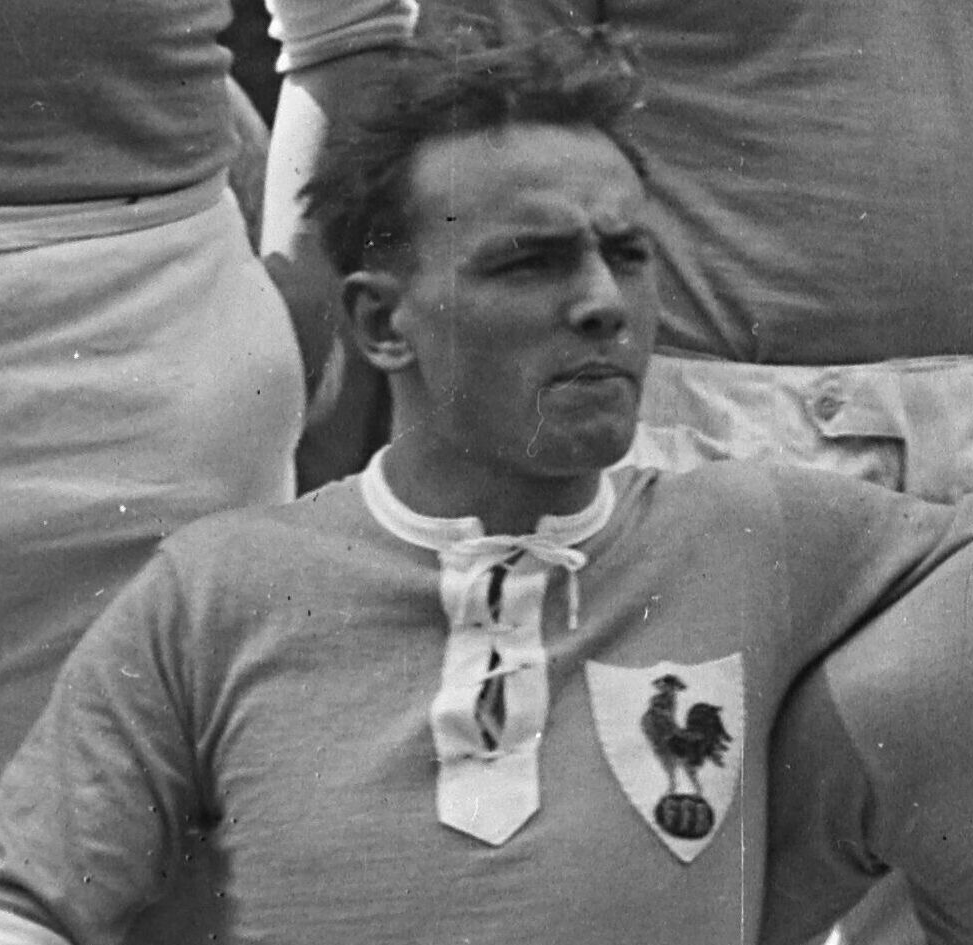
Robert Samatan coached Joseph Crespo at RC Roanne and later at US Lyon-Villeurbanne, where they enjoyed numerous successes together.

RC Roanne underwent major upheaval during the off-season. Its president, Claudius Devernois, who had financially supported the club for fifteen years, noted that its budget remained unbalanced despite the money he contributed every season. He also faced dissatisfaction within the club's management, while ticket revenues fell short of expectations. In consultation with the French Rugby League Federation, he was encouraged to concentrate his efforts on the Lyon region and take over US Lyon-Villeurbanne, a club located in what was described as a "revenue-generating urban area". He finalised the move in September 1949, taking numerous players with him. Joseph Crespo followed, as did Jean Audoubert, René Duffort, Pierre Taillantou and Henri Riu, together with their coach Robert Samatan. The formation of this new club, bringing together so many players, raised questions about whether it would be easy to achieve a cohesive team.

The opening matches dispelled any doubts about the Lyon team, which quickly climbed towards the top of the Championship standings and emerged as a potential contender for national titles. France opened its international season in November against Wales. Joseph Crespo was called up but was not included in the starting line-up and missed the opening match, as Jean Duhau named him as a reserve and selected Marseille scrum-half Jean Dop instead. For the following match against England, Crespo was named at centre with Duffort alongside him, while Jep Maso remained on the bench. France suffered its second defeat of the season, losing 13–5. Crespo, like his teammates, failed to perform to expectations, coming under sustained pressure from the English attack. This proved to be his only international appearance of the season, as he was not selected to face Other Nationalities in January 1950.

In both the Championship and the French Cup, the Lyon club continued to produce high-level performances, notably defeating league leaders XIII Catalan in December 1949, RC Marseille in March 1950, and especially Puig-Aubert's AS Carcassonne 13–8 in the round of 16 of the French Cup. In the latter match, Crespo, playing at scrum-half, was the main architect of the victory. Before the decisive matches at the end of the season, he also took part in a Catalans–Basques representative match in Carcassonne, organised to promote rugby league, which the Catalans won 38–23.

Crespo and his Lyon teammates faced AS Carcassonne in the French Championship semi-final. Although US Lyon-Villeurbanne had beaten Carcassonne in the French Cup, they had been held to a 3–3 draw in October 1949 and defeated 15–0 by the same opponents in December 1949. The semi-final remained extremely evenly contested until the hour mark, with the score 0–0 at half-time, before Carcassonne eventually prevailed 10–6 in a match played in a combative atmosphere. Crespo was among the injured players whose condition prompted club president Devernois to demand explanations from the Federation, although his injury did not prevent him from taking part in the French Cup final against XIII Catalan. The French Cup final, played in Perpignan, saw XIII Catalan triumph 12–5 thanks to the performance of their forwards, despite Crespo's skilful play, bringing his season to an end without a title.

==== 1950–1951: European Championship winner with France and French champion with Lyon ====
Joseph Crespo began the new season on the banks of the Rhône with US Lyon-Villeurbanne, which asserted its status as a contender for national titles, strengthened by the arrival of Roger Rey and Hugues Baldassin, among others. The Lyon club made a good start to the season and confirmed its ambitions. Crespo, who enjoyed an excellent start to the campaign, including a performance against Toulouse Olympique in which he scored three tries, once again attracted the attention of national coach Jean Duhau, who included him in his preliminary selection for the 1951 European Championship. With his selection uncertain until the last moment, Crespo was eventually named in the starting thirteen to face England in November 1950, playing at centre alongside René Duffort following Déjean's unavailability. In a closely contested match, with the scores level at 9–9 until the 78th minute, a ball lost in attack by Louis Mazon allowed England to launch one final counterattack, resulting in the winning try. Despite the defeat, France produced open and attractive rugby that gave encouragement to the players, with Crespo singled out for an outstanding performance. Deployed at centre for France because of the presence of Jean Dop of RC Marseille, Crespo found himself in the same situation at club level, despite his desire to return to scrum-half. Throughout the season, the two players were engaged in a rivalry from a distance for a place in the halves for the French national team. However, for the second international match against Other Nationalities in December 1950, France opted for caution and once again relied on Crespo's versatility at centre in order to field a Galaup–Duffort halves partnership, with Dop not selected. The match against a representative side largely made up of Australian players went in France's favour, with a 16–3 victory. Crespo was described as the best French player, having played a part in both French tries, scoring the first himself and providing the decisive pass to Édouard Ponsinet for the second. The press described him as being in a "state of grace".

At the beginning of 1951, France began consulting the players who would take part in the four-month tour of Australia and New Zealand, as well as their wives. Six Lyon players were being considered, including Crespo, Duffort, Taillantou, Bousse, Riu and Montrucolis, for this four-month tour running from mid-May to mid-August 1951. In the Championship, competition was fierce for the four leading places among five contenders: Villeneuve, Marseille, Carcassonne, XIII Catalan and Lyon. The latter occupied fifth place in February 1951 despite a victory over league leaders Villeneuve. It was not until the final match at the end of March that Lyon secured qualification for the Championship semi-finals, thanks to a victory over FC Lézignan, during which Crespo left his teammates playing with twelve men in order to preserve himself for the matches ahead.

Second European Championship title in 1951
France 28–13 Wales
France team:

Puig-Aubert (captain) – Odé Lepes, Jacques Merquey, Joseph Crespo, Raymond Contrastin – Charles Galaup (stand-off), Irénée Carrère (scrum-half) – François Rinaldi, Martin Martin, André Béraud, Élie Brousse, Michel Lopez, Raoul Pérez

Coach: Jean Duhau

In the final stages of the season, Crespo first took part in the 42–0 victory over RC Carpentras in the quarter-finals of the French Cup, before being selected at centre for the final European Championship match against Wales. A French victory in this match would allow the national team to win the title. For this match, played at the Stade Vélodrome in Marseille, the press described France's attacking strength as a "magic square" made up of "Carrère–Galaup–Crespo–Merquey". France won 28–13, with three tries scored by Raoul Pérez. Crespo thus claimed his second European Championship title.

Third French Championship title in 1951
US Lyon-Villeurbanne 15–10 XIII Catalan
Lyon-Villeurbanne team:

René Lhoste – Maurice Voron, Roger Rey, Maurice Bellan, Antoine Lécuyer – René Duffort (stand-off), Joseph Crespo (scrum-half) – Henri Riu, Jean Audoubert, Joseph Vanel, François Montrucolis, Élie Brousse, René Lasserre

Coach: Robert Samatan

Returning to domestic competition, Crespo and Lyon faced AS Carcassonne in the French Championship semi-final in Perpignan. He was partnered with Duffort in the halves and finally played at scrum-half. Lyon won 16–11, surprising Carcassonne, who had been considered favourites, and set up a final against XIII Catalan in Toulouse. The Catalan side were also regarded as favourites against Lyon, with a scrum-half duel expected between Crespo and Carrère. Ultimately, Lyon XIII claimed the title with a 15–10 victory, scoring all their points in the second half through five tries after the Catalans had led 5–0 at half-time. Crespo, although less prominent, nevertheless played an active part in the victory by contributing to one of the tries towards the end of the match. This was Crespo's third French Championship title. The following week, the two teams met again in the French Cup semi-final for a rematch, although Carrère was absent for the Catalans and replaced by Ascola. In a repeat of the Championship final, the same scenario seemed to unfold, with the Catalans dominating for fifty minutes before eventually losing by an even wider margin, 18–2, including a try by Crespo, putting Lyon on course for an unprecedented league and cup double. The French Cup final, played in Marseille before the team's major departure for Australia, saw Lyon regarded as favourites against AS Carcassonne in view of their strong end to the season. In the final, Lyon led 10–9 with twelve minutes remaining, before allowing Carcassonne to pull away and win 22–10.

==== 1951: Triumphant tour of Australia by the French national team ====
1951 French national team tour
Australia 15–26 France
Australia 23–11 France
Australia 14–35 France
New Zealand 16–15 France

French national team touring squad:

Maurice André, Puig-Aubert, Jean Audoubert, Paul Bartoletti, Maurice Bellan, André Béraud, Élie Brousse, Robert Caillou, Gaston Calixte, Vincent Cantoni, Gaston Comes, Raymond Contrastin, Joseph Crespo, Guy Delaye, Jean Dop, René Duffort, Charles Galaup, Gabriel Genoud, Odé Lepes, Michel Lopez, Martin Martin, Louis Mazon, Jacques Merquey, François Montrucolis, Raoul Pérez, Édouard Ponsinet, and François Rinaldi.

Long uncertain about whether he would accompany the French national team, Joseph Crespo was contacted as early as January about the four-month tour of Australia and New Zealand, but postponed his decision while awaiting the birth of his first child. Finally, in early April 1951, he gave his consent, allowing the French federation to select 27 players.

Departing from Marseille, the French national team players were accompanied by tour director Antoine Blain and coaches Jean Duhau and Robert Samatan. They travelled aboard a specially adapted four-engine aircraft that carried them towards Sydney, with stopovers in Rome, Cairo, Karachi, Calcutta, Singapore, Jakarta and Darwin.

Once in Australia, the French team played numerous friendly matches against local clubs and representative sides before facing Australia, with the first Test scheduled for 11 June 1951 in Sydney. Crespo notably distinguished himself against a Sydney representative team on 2 June, scoring a try. Competing with Jean Dop for the scrum-half position in the first Test against Australia, Dop was eventually selected, leaving Crespo on the bench. France won the first Test 26–15. For the second Test against the same opponents, scheduled for 30 June, Crespo was this time included in the starting line-up at centre. In Brisbane, Australia took their revenge with a 23–11 victory, having trailed 12–6 at half-time.

Third Test match and France's historic 35–14 victory
Australia 14–35 France
France team:

Puig-Aubert (captain) – Vincent Cantoni, Jacques Merquey, Gaston Comes, Raymond Contrastin – René Duffort (stand-off), Joseph Crespo (scrum-half) – Louis Mazon, Gabriel Genoud, Paul Bartoletti, Élie Brousse, Édouard Ponsinet, Gaston Calixte

Coach: Jean Duhau

The deciding Test was played in Sydney before a crowd of 67,000 spectators. In this match, France achieved a remarkable feat by winning 35–14, with Crespo emerging as one of the outstanding players after scoring three tries. At the time, it was the heaviest defeat ever inflicted on Australia, all the more remarkable as it occurred on Australian soil. Australia had also never previously conceded more than 27 points, a total scored against them by England 41 years earlier. The match had a major impact throughout the rugby league world and in Australia, where few had imagined that the national team could be so comprehensively dominated at home. Crespo and his teammates were consequently praised throughout the press. He played in the final Test against New Zealand, once again at scrum-half, but France lost 16–15. Nevertheless, France emerged as the overwhelming winners of the tour, recording 21 victories, two draws and only four defeats.

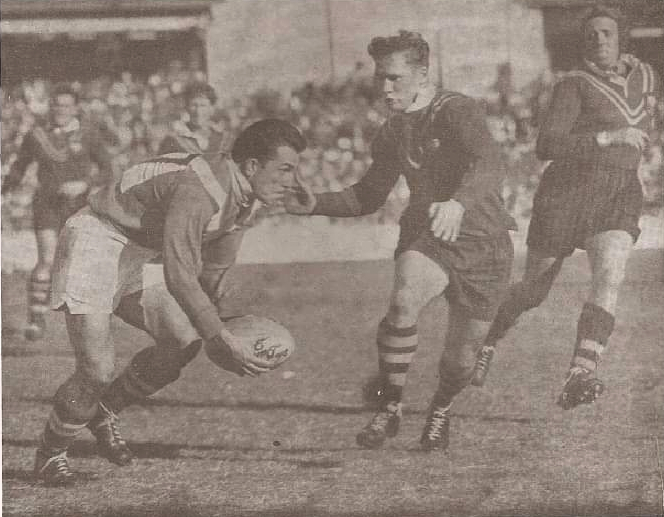
Joseph Crespo against Australia.

The French team's return in mid-September took place in Marseille, where an enormous crowd had gathered to acclaim the players following their triumphant tour. Watched by thousands of spectators, Crespo and his teammates paraded by car from the town hall to the Bouches-du-Rhône prefecture, travelling along the Canebière and Allées Léon-Gambetta, with each player riding in an open-top car. They were received at the town hall by the Minister of National Education, among others.

==== 1951–1952: Crespo maintains US Lyon-Villeurbanne's standing before suffering the physical effects of the tour ====
Following this tour, which left its mark on the history of French rugby league, a Parisian club was established around a number of leading French players. US Lyon-Villeurbanne was no exception, losing René Duffort, Élie Brousse and Maurice Bellan to the capital. Joseph Crespo was also mentioned for a possible move to Paris but ultimately remained in Lyon. The Lyon club, defending French champions, relied on Crespo, now the team's captain, to maintain its standing and remain among the leading clubs in the Championship.

Third European Championship title in 1952, including this victory over England
France 42–13 England
France team:

Puig-Aubert (captain) – Raymond Contrastin, Joseph Crespo, Louis Llari, Vincent Cantoni – Jacques Merquey (stand-off), Jean Dop (scrum-half) – Paul Bartoletti, Martin Martin, François Rinaldi, Gabriel Berthomieu, Élie Brousse, Roger Guilhem

Coach: Jean Duhau

During this season, he was used at scrum-half following Duffort's departure, partnering his stand-off Pierre Taillantou. After the opening matches, Lyon were quickly identified as potential Championship winners, with Crespo directing their play. He was considered the best French player in the Championship ahead of selection for the first international match on 3 November against Other Nationalities in the European Championship. He was reunited with René Duffort in the halves for this match, playing at scrum-half, and was regarded alongside Puig-Aubert as France's best player, particularly because of his versatility across the backline, allowing him to switch from scrum-half to centre. France's first appearance since the tour thus took place in Hull before more than 30,000 spectators. France took an entire half to settle into the match and trailed 9–4 at half-time. Despite more balanced play in the second half, France reacted too late to secure victory and lost 17–14. Crespo was named among France's best performers, and his place in the squad was not called into question for the remainder of the international season. The second international match took place on 25 November at the Stade Vélodrome against England. France relied on Puig-Aubert for points and Crespo to organise their attacking play. Crespo was moved to centre to make way for the Merquey–Dop halves partnership. France completely overwhelmed England, winning 42–13 with ten tries, including three scored by Crespo, who was regarded as the French team's best attacking player.

US Lyon-Villeurbanne continued to rely on Crespo and its forwards, while he ended 1951 with two matches against New Zealand, which had arrived for its European tour and was scheduled to face France on 23 and 30 December 1951. The first match, at the Parc des Princes before a crowd of nearly 25,000 spectators, ended in an 8–3 French victory, with Crespo playing at centre alongside Maurice Voron, who was making his international debut. Together with Jacques Merquey, Crespo formed a centre partnership regarded as one of the best in the world, giving France the ability to defeat any national team. For the second match, suffering from lumbago, Crespo withdrew from the team and watched his teammates win 17–7 in Bordeaux.

At US Lyon-Villeurbanne, Crespo experienced a decline in form during the second half of the season following his lumbago and suffered a succession of physical problems. By March, he was confined to bed and ordered to rest for at least three weeks, causing him to miss selection for France's final European Championship match against Wales. France won 20–12, allowing the national team and Crespo to claim the title. He also missed the final matches of the regular season in the Championship. He returned to the Lyon team for the final stages, experiencing elimination in the semi-finals of the French Cup against XIII Catalan, despite being Lyon's best player, followed by elimination in the French Championship semi-finals against RC Marseille, losing 34–13 in a match in which Lyon were forced to play with eleven men following injuries to Sabeyrac early in the match and Robert Lucia in the 15th minute. He ended his season with a prestigious match against the British Lions at the Parc des Princes, playing at stand-off alongside Jean Dop in the halves and securing a 22–12 victory.

==== 1952–1954: Two French Cup titles ====
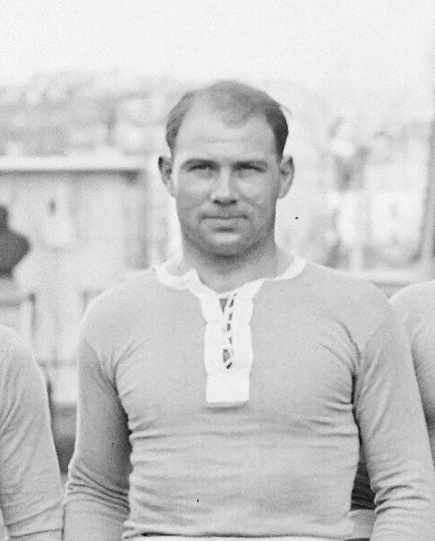
Lyon coach Charles Petit appointed Joseph Crespo as the team's captain.

Within the powerful Lyon team, captain Joseph Crespo was one of its most active players. At the beginning of the 1952–1953 season, the team retained the same core of players and established itself as one of the most attractive sides. Crespo missed the start of the season due to a kidney problem and returned in late September. Considered to be out of form, he was consequently unable to take part in France's first international match against Wales in October 1952, nor in the second against Other Nationalities, both of which France lost. For its part, Lyon found itself some distance from the leading positions in December, occupying seventh place, far below its ambitions. The club also attracted negative press following a match against RC Marseille, from which the Lyon players withdrew, claiming that they wished to avoid a fight. The Marseille players, however, accused Lyon of leaving the field because they were facing stronger opponents and wanted to avoid a heavy defeat. Lyon began to recover from mid-December and looked capable of climbing the standings, coinciding with Crespo's return to his best form. After three rounds of French national team selections, he was called up to face Australia in the second Test, played in Bordeaux on 11 January 1953. Paired with Gilbert Benausse in the halves, France caused a sensation by winning 5–0 in a match in which Crespo was named among the best players. For the third encounter between the two national teams, the French selectors retained the Benausse–Crespo halves partnership, with the same success, as France won 13–5, with ten points scored by Puig-Aubert.

For the remainder of the season, U.S. Lyon-Villeurbanne enjoyed a much stronger second half of the campaign, lifting the club back into the top four qualifying places for the semi-finals of the Championship. From late March, coach Charles Petit finally had his full squad available after a season marked by the absences and poor form of many of his players, and set his sights on winning both national titles.

US Lyon-Villeurbanne's victory in the 1953 French Cup
US Lyon-Villeurbanne 9–8 US Villeneuve
US Lyon-Villeurbanne team:

Robert Lucia – Maurice Voron, Sabayrac, Antoine Lécuyer, Gérard Bastianelli – Joseph Crespo (stand-off), Guy Lucia (scrum-half) – Joseph Krawczyk, Jean Audoubert, Joseph Vanel, Hugues Baldassin, Taterzinski, François Montrucolis

Coach: Charles Petit

During the decisive months of April and May 1953, Crespo was first called up to the French national team on the strength of his contribution to the victories over Australia earlier in the year. For the final match of the European Championship against England, France selected a decidedly attack-minded team and once again fielded the Benausse–Crespo halves partnership. France trailed throughout the match and were defeated 15–13, with Crespo scoring the only French try in front of 25,000 spectators at the Parc des Princes in Paris. Lyon XIII were competing on both domestic fronts. Having qualified for the final of the French Cup, they had eliminated AS Carcassonne and then Celtic de Paris, and were set to face US Villeneuve in the final. In the Championship, Lyon finished the regular season in fourth place and eliminated Bordeaux XIII 6–4 in the semi-final to face AS Carcassonne in the final. Against Carcassonne in Toulouse, the Lyon club largely dominated the first half thanks to its forward pack but failed to build a decisive lead. Carcassonne took advantage in the second half to claim their fifth French Championship title with a 19–12 victory. For the French Cup final, played in Perpignan, Crespo took the kick-off and Lyon led 9–0 at half-time. With this advantage, Lyon resisted throughout the second half and, with some good fortune, managed to maintain a single-point lead to win 9–8. Crespo celebrated his first French Cup title with his teammates, notably the brothers Guy and Robert Lucia. He ended his season with one final match for France against Great Britain in Lyon, before nearly 6,000 spectators, securing a 28–17 victory.

The 1953–1954 season began perfectly for Crespo and US Lyon-Villeurbanne, who quickly moved to the top of the Championship standings. Meanwhile, the French national team prepared for its match against Other Nationalities in late October as part of the 1954 European Championship, with Crespo selected at scrum-half and Merquey at stand-off. In a high-quality encounter, France believed they could snatch victory against the British Empire side, but the latter scored a try in the closing stages to win 15–10. Crespo was unable to take part in the second match, scheduled against England on 7 November, due to illness. Roger Guilhem took his place at scrum-half as France suffered a 7–5 defeat, but Crespo returned to face Wales on 13 December in Marseille. Although showing signs of fatigue, he did not shy away from his defensive duties and contributed to the 23–22 victory over the Welsh, preventing France from finishing the European Championship without a win.

US Lyon-Villeurbanne's victory in the 1954 French Cup
US Lyon-Villeurbanne 17–15 XIII Catalan
US Lyon-Villeurbanne team:

Robert Lucia – Maurice Voron, Sabeyrac, Antoine Lécuyer, Gérard Bastianelli – René Duffort (stand-off), Joseph Crespo (scrum-half) – Joseph Vanel, Jean Audoubert, Joseph Krawczyk, Guy Augey, Élie Brousse, François Montrucolis

Coach: Charles Petit

The Lyon XIII club, captained by Crespo, produced a series of strong performances towards the end of the season. In late March, Lyon eliminated Bordeaux XIII 25–16 in the quarter-finals, followed by RC Marseille in the semi-finals of the French Cup in April. US Lyon-Villeurbanne thus defended their title in the final on 9 May against XIII Catalan. In the Championship, after finishing second in the regular season, Lyon were surprised by Bordeaux, who avenged their French Cup defeat with a 15–4 victory. In the French Cup final, played in Cavaillon, Crespo led his Lyon club to its second consecutive French Cup title alongside René Duffort, with a narrow 17–15 victory.

==== 1954: Finalist in the first Rugby League World Cup ====
In October and November 1954, France hosted the first Rugby League World Cup in history, at the initiative of French federation president Paul Barrière, inviting the three other major rugby league nations: Australia, Great Britain and New Zealand. Joseph Crespo was selected for the inaugural tournament alongside three other Lyon players—Jean Audoubert, Joseph Krawczyk and Maurice Voron—and owed his selection to his versatility, being equally comfortable playing at scrum-half and centre.

Joseph Crespo played at scrum-half in the opening match of the World Cup against New Zealand, with the ceremonial kick-off performed by French cycling champion Louison Bobet at the Parc des Princes in Paris before nearly 15,000 spectators. After a first half in which the two teams traded blows, with France leading 12–8, the second half began with a try by Crespo following a 30-metre sprint after receiving a well-timed pass from Vincent Cantoni. This allowed France to establish a decisive advantage in the match, which they never relinquished, winning 22–13 and giving the French national team an ideal start to the tournament. The second match, played in Toulouse, pitted France against Great Britain and was something of a final before the final, following the British victory over Australia in their opening match. Crespo retained his position at scrum-half, with Gilbert Benausse at stand-off. The match was fiercely contested by both teams, with successful penalties at either end. Crespo played a part in one of France's two tries, sending Raymond Contrastin through to score. The match ended in a 13–13 draw, leaving the two teams level. France's third match was played in Nantes against Australia on 11 November. After losing to Great Britain, Australia had defeated New Zealand. At the end of a closely contested match, France won 15–5, with Crespo praised for his tireless defensive work and determined tackling.

1954 Rugby League World Cup final
France 12–16 Great Britain (United Kingdom)
France team:

Puig-Aubert – Vincent Cantoni, Claude Teisseire, Jacques Merquey, Raymond Contrastin – Antoine Jimenez (stand-off), Joseph Crespo (scrum-half) – François Rinaldi, Jean Audoubert (captain), Joseph Krawczyk, Armand Save, Jean Pambrun, Gilbert Verdié

Coaches: Jean Duhau and René Duffort

The final, which had not originally been scheduled, was held because the two teams were level on points in the standings after their victories over the Southern Hemisphere nations and their 13–13 draw. Organised in just four days, the match attracted 30,368 spectators to the Parc des Princes in Paris. Great Britain dominated the first half thanks to tries by Gordon Brown and David Rose, with James Ledgard converting the second, before Puig-Aubert added another penalty. The score was therefore 8–4 in favour of the British at half-time. After the interval, Cantoni scored a try converted by Puig-Aubert, allowing France to take a 9–8 lead. The British then pressed home their advantage with two further tries from Gerry Helme, converted by Ledgard, and Brown, making the score 16–9. For France, Contrastin brought his team back into contention. The pressure on the British players then became intense, but against all expectations, they managed to hold on and thus became the first world champions in rugby league history. Crespo played in the final at scrum-half and had taken part in every match of the World Cup, partnering stand-off Antoine Jimenez in the halves. Crespo produced a respectable performance but was unable to play as effectively as his direct opponent Gerry Helme.

==== 1954–1955: Final French Championship title before retirement ====
The 1954–1955 French Championship, which had begun before the inaugural Rugby League World Cup, resumed immediately after the final. Joseph Crespo and his Lyon team dominated the Championship at the halfway stage, ahead of AS Carcassonne and SO Avignon. Crespo remained the driving force behind the team alongside Jean Audoubert and Guy Augey. He made no international appearances for France, as there was no European Championship that season following the staging of the World Cup. However, he was called up for exhibition matches with a representative side designated as the "France team", which faced a South-East selection and another side known as the "Rest". Crespo played at scrum-half in the halves alongside Gilbert Benausse and then Charles Galaup in these matches, held in February and March 1955.

US Lyon-Villeurbanne's final French Championship victory in 1955
US Lyon-Villeurbanne 7–6 AS Carcassonne
US Lyon-Villeurbanne team:

Guy Lucia – Gérard Bastianelli, Antoine Lécuyer, Roger Rey, Maurice Voron – Joseph Crespo (stand-off), Gérard Dautant (scrum-half) – Joseph Vanel, Jean Audoubert, Joseph Krawczyk, Taterzinski, Guy Augey, René Duffort

Coach: Charles Petit

In the French Cup, Lyon, the two-time defending champions, suffered an early 15–3 defeat to US Villeneuve in the round of 16. The Lyon players therefore concentrated their efforts on the French Championship, where they still occupied first place. US Lyon-Villeurbanne qualified for the Championship semi-finals and faced SO Avignon. They won 11–2 and advanced to the final. In Toulouse, before more than 15,000 spectators, the outcome of the final between US Lyon-Villeurbanne and AS Carcassonne remained uncertain for much of the match. Crespo, a valuable presence in the halves alongside Duffort, distributed the ball and launched attacking moves. Lyon ultimately prevailed by a single point, winning 7–6 thanks to a late try by Maurice Voron.

He brought his career to a close with one final prestigious match, joining a France B team against a Welsh representative side in Nantes. On this occasion, Wales played their last match in their red jersey before being incorporated into the Other Nationalities representative side because of their limited pool of players, while the French senior national team embarked on a tour of the Southern Hemisphere.

=== After retirement ===
Following his retirement from professional rugby league, Joseph Crespo stepped away from the playing field, neither taking up a coaching role nor holding any position within a club. However, together with Pierre Taillantou and Henri Riu, he initiated the creation of the "Amicale d'entraide des anciens treizistes du Roannais", an association providing mutual support to former rugby league players from the Roanne area. After working for the Devernois company, Crespo became a travelling sales representative (VRP multicarte) selling haberdashery products. He died on 7 May 2004 in Mably.

== Honours ==
=== Rugby union ===
- Team honours:
  - Winner of the French Rugby Union Championship: 1944 (USA Perpignan).
  - Winner of the Coupe Frantz-Reichel: 1943 (USA Perpignan).

==== Club statistics ====
Season		Championship		Cup	
Season		Comp.	Pos.	Comp.	Pos.
1942–43	(France) USA Perpignan	French Championship	Quarter-finals	Coupe de France	Semi-finals
1943–44	(France) USA Perpignan	French Championship	Winner	Coupe de France	Round of 16

=== Rugby league ===
- Team honours:
  - Winner of the European Rugby League Championship: 1949, 1951 and 1952 (France).
  - Winner of the French Rugby League Championship: 1947, 1948 (Roanne), 1951 and 1955 (Lyon).
  - Winner of the French Cup: 1953 and 1954 (Lyon).
  - Runner-up in the Rugby League World Cup: 1954 (France).
  - Runner-up in the French Rugby League Championship: 1953 (Lyon).
  - Runner-up in the French Cup: 1950 and 1951 (Lyon).

==== World Cup ====
Joseph Crespo's results at the Rugby League World Cup
Edition	Rank	France's results	Crespo's results	Crespo's matches
France 1954	Runner-up	2 W, 1 D, 1 L	2 W, 1 D, 1 L	4/4

Legend: W = win; D = draw; L = loss.

==== European Championship ====
Joseph Crespo's results at the European Championship
Edition	Rank	France's results	Crespo's results	Crespo's matches
1948	2nd	2 W, 0 D, 2 L	0 W, 0 D, 1 L	1/4
1949	1st	3 W, 0 D, 1 L	2 W, 0 D, 1 L	3/4
1950	4th	1 W, 0 D, 2 L	0 W, 0 D, 1 L	1/3
1951	1st	2 W, 0 D, 1 L	2 W, 0 D, 1 L	3/3
1952	1st	2 W, 0 D, 1 L	1 W, 0 D, 1 L	2/3
1953	4th	0 W, 0 D, 3 L	0 W, 0 D, 1 L	1/3
1954	3rd	1 W, 0 D, 2 L	0 W, 0 D, 1 L	1/3

==== International appearances ====
Joseph Crespo's international matches
No.	Date	Opponent	Result	Competition	Position	Points	Tries	Pen.	Drops
Representing France
1	25 January 1948	New Zealand	25–7	Test match	Scrum-half	–	–	–	–
2	11 April 1948	England	10–25	European Championship	Scrum-half	–	–	–	–
3	28 November 1948	England	5–12	European Championship	Stand-off	–	–	–	–
4	9 January 1949	Australia	10–29	Tour	Centre	–	–	–	–
5	23 January 1949	Australia	0–10	Tour	Scrum-half	–	–	–	–
6	12 March 1949	England	12–5	European Championship	Stand-off	–	–	–	–
7	10 April 1949	Wales	11–0	European Championship	Centre	–	–	–	–
8	4 December 1949	England	5–13	European Championship	Centre	–	–	–	–
9	11 November 1950	England	9–14	European Championship	Centre	–	–	–	–
10	10 December 1950	Other Nationalities	16–3	European Championship	Centre	3	1	–	–
11	15 April 1951	Wales	28–13	European Championship	Centre	–	–	–	–
12	30 June 1951	Australia	11–23	Tour	Centre	–	–	–	–
13	21 July 1951	Australia	35–14	Tour	Scrum-half	9	3	–	–
14	4 August 1951	New Zealand	15–16	Tour	Scrum-half	–	–	–	–
15	3 November 1951	Other Nationalities	14–17	European Championship	Scrum-half	–	–	–	–
16	25 November 1951	England	42–13	European Championship	Centre	9	3	–	–
17	23 December 1951	New Zealand	8–3	Tour	Centre	–	–	–	–
18	22 May 1952	(United Kingdom) Great Britain	22–12	Test match	Stand-off	6	2	–	–
19	11 January 1953	Australia	5–0	Tour	Stand-off	–	–	–	–
20	25 January 1953	Australia	13–5	Tour	Scrum-half	–	–	–	–
21	11 April 1953	England	13–15	European Championship	Scrum-half	3	1	–	–
22	24 May 1953	(United Kingdom) Great Britain	28–17	Test match	Scrum-half	8	2	1	–
23	18 October 1953	Other Nationalities	10–15	European Championship	Scrum-half	–	–	–	–
24	13 December 1953	Wales	23–22	European Championship	Scrum-half	–	–	–	–
25	30 October 1954	New Zealand	22–13	World Cup	Scrum-half	–	–	–	–
26	7 November 1954	(United Kingdom) Great Britain	13–13	World Cup	Scrum-half	–	–	–	–
27	11 November 1954	Australia	15–5	World Cup	Scrum-half	–	–	–	–
28	13 November 1954	(United Kingdom) Great Britain	12–16	World Cup	Scrum-half	–	–	–	–

==== Club and international statistics ====
Season		Championship		Cup		International appearances					
Season		Comp.	Pos.	Comp.	Pos.	Comp.	M	Pts	Tr	Goals	DG
1945–46	(France) RC Roanne	French Championship	Semi-finals	French Cup	Semi-finals						
1946–47	(France) RC Roanne	French Championship	Winner	French Cup	Quarter-finals						
1947–48	(France) RC Roanne	French Championship	Winner	French Cup	Quarter-finals	EC	2	–	–	–	–
1948–49	(France) RC Roanne	French Championship	Semi-finals	French Cup	Semi-finals	EC	5	–	–	–	–
1949–50	(France) US Lyon-Villeurbanne	French Championship	Semi-finals	French Cup	Runner-up	EC	1	–	–	–	–
1950–51	(France) US Lyon-Villeurbanne	French Championship	Winner	French Cup	Runner-up	EC / T	6	12	4	–	–
1951–52	(France) US Lyon-Villeurbanne	French Championship	Semi-finals	French Cup	Semi-finals	EC	4	15	5	–	–
1952–53	(France) US Lyon-Villeurbanne	French Championship	Runner-up	French Cup	Winner	EC	4	11	3	1	–
1953–54	(France) US Lyon-Villeurbanne	French Championship	Semi-finals	French Cup	Winner	EC	2	–	–	–	–
1954–55	(France) US Lyon-Villeurbanne	French Championship	Winner	French Cup	Round of 16	WC	4	3	1	–	–

== See also ==
=== Bibliography ===
- Garcia, Henri (1960). Rugby Champagne (in French). La Table Ronde. OCLC 173499711.
- Passamar, André (1984). L'Encyclopédie de Treize Magazine (in French). Toulouse: Treize Magazine. OCLC 461737232.
- Bonnery, Louis (1996). Le rugby à XIII : le plus français du monde (in French). Cano & Frank. OCLC 45029080.
- Arcas, Denis (2019). Rugby à XIII : Il était une fois … Le rugby de Liberté : 1933-1941, de la naissance à l'interdiction (in French). Saint-Ouen: Les Éditions du Net. ISBN 9782312065854.
- Racing Club de Roanne 13 (2004). Rugby XIII - 1934-2004 - 70 ans (in French). Riorges: France Graphic.
