= Henri Riu =

France international rugby league & union player (1920–2014)

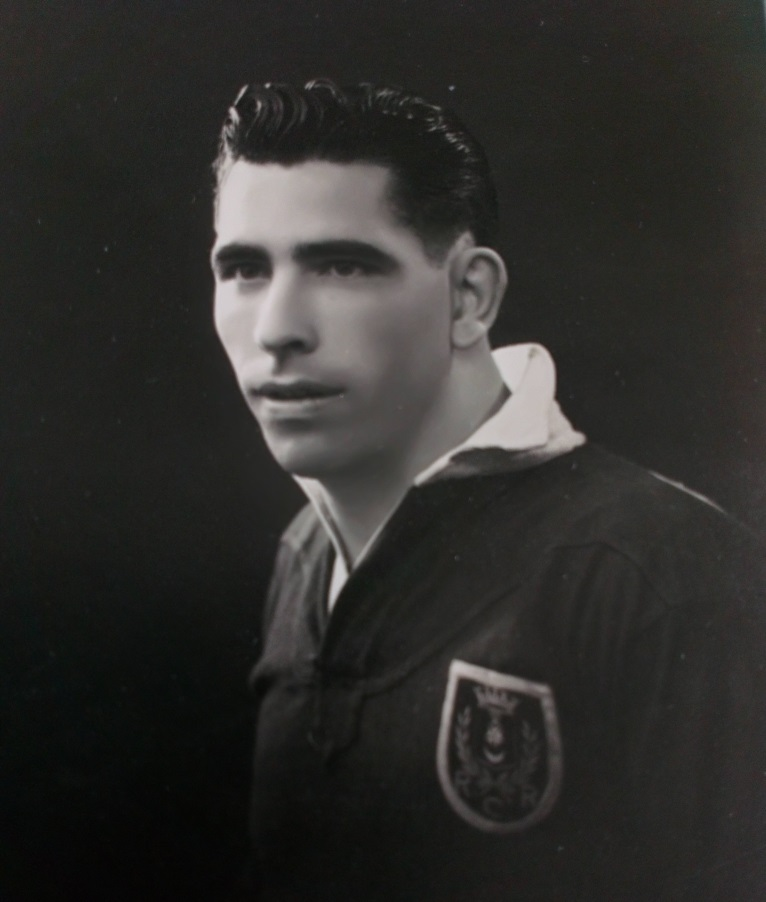

Personal information
- Born: 26 January 1920 Perpignan, Pyrénées-Orientales, France
- Died: 24 January 2014 (aged 93) Roanne, France

Playing information
- Height: 1.77 m (5 ft 10 in)

Rugby union
- Position: flanker, prop, lock, and hooker
Club
Years	Team	Pld	T	G	FG	P
193?–43	USA Perpignan

Rugby league
- Position: Prop, Second-row
Club
Years	Team	Pld	T	G	FG	P
1945–50	RC Roanne
1951–53	US Lyon-Villeurbanne
	Total	0	0	0	0	0
Representative
Years	Team	Pld	T	G	FG	P
1948–49	France	2

Henri Riu (January 26, 1920 – January 24, 2014) was a Rugby union and rugby league player, representing France internationally in rugby league. He played as a flanker, prop, lock, and hooker.

Native of Perpignan, he played rugby union for USA Perpignan before World War II. A promising talent in rugby union, he won the Frantz-Reichel Cup in 1938 but missed out on playing in the final of the French Championship the following year, despite his team qualifying. During the war, he was unable to participate in the 1944 title, as he was requisitioned for compulsory labour service in Germany.

In 1945, he caught the attention of RC Roanne's Rugby league club officials, led by Claudius Devernois, and decided to switch to rugby league, along with Joseph Crespo. He became one of the most successful forwards in the French Championship, winning it in 1947 and 1948 with RC Roanne. Later, he joined US Lyon-Villeurbanne and secured a third French Championship title in 1951. His impressive performances in Rugby league club matches earned him selection for the French national team, where he earned two caps in 1948 and 1949.

== Biography ==
=== Youth and early career ===
Henri Riu was born on 26 January 1920, in Perpignan (Pyrénées-Orientales). His father, Honoré Riu (born in Perpignan on October 2, 1887, and died on May 6, 1976), was a mason, and his mother, Angèle Cayrol (born in Perpignan on December 22, 1886), worked in a factory. He had two sisters, Marguerite (1913–1992) and Jeanne (1930–2018), and a brother, André (1921–1983), who played Rugby league in Thuir. He married Monique Barnay (1927–2005) in 1948 in Vougy, with whom he had two children, Robert and Pierre-Jean.

From a young age, Henri played rugby union in his hometown and quickly joined the USA Perpignan club. As a leader of the club's junior team, he won the Frantz-Reichel Cup (French under-21 championship) in 1938 and participated in some senior team matches during the 1938–1939 season, although he was not selected to play in the French Championship final, where his teammates, including Frédéric Trescazes, were defeated by Biarritz Olympique 6–0 after extra time.

The outbreak of World War II temporarily suspended championships, which resumed in 1941. Henri, remaining in Perpignan, continued his sports practice with USA Perpignan. In 1943, he was conscripted into compulsory labour service and had to go to Germany. He missed the 1943–1944 season, during which his club won the French Championship title with his teammates Joseph Crespo, Puig-Aubert, Frédéric Trescazes, and Lucien Barris. While in Germany, he worked for Messerschmitt in Regensburg and managed to continue playing rugby union alongside Armand Balent, Henri Abelanet, and Henri Valls.

=== 1945-1949: Transition to Rugby League and Career at R.C. Roanne ===
==== 1945-1946: Front Row at R.C. Roanne ====
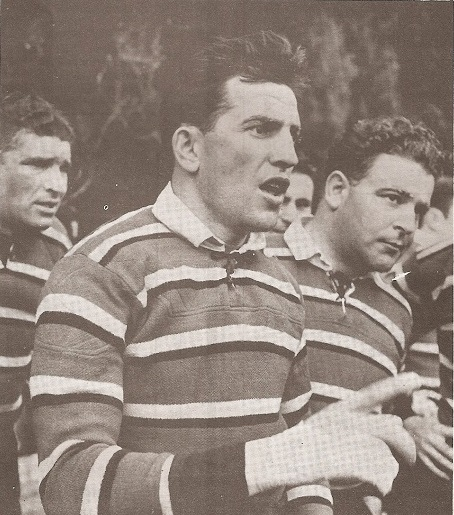
His teammate from U.S.A. Perpignan, Joseph Crespo, also joined R.C. Roanne at the same time as him.

Upon his return to France in 1945, a friendly rugby union match involving USA Perpignan and Castres Olympique changed Henri Riu's life. Representatives from R.C. Roanne, a rugby league club, were in the stands scouting and recruiting players to revive the club, one of the most prestigious before the war. The club had won the French Championship in 1939 with players like René Arotça, Jean Dauger, and Max Rousié, but the war and the Vichy regime had halted the competition. Henri Riu caught the attention of the Roanne officials, who convinced him to join them in the Loire region and switch to rugby league. He also acted as a mentor to Joseph Crespo, a scrum-half from Perpignan who had won the French Championship in 1944. At this point, Henri Riu left his job as a mason and began working as a knitwear representative in Roanne.

He settled in the Roanne area and joined a team where many Catalans, including Crespo, were already playing, under the guidance of coach Jean Duhau, a former French international in both rugby union and league before the war. In his first season, Henri Riu formed part of the front row for R.C. Roanne alongside Vincent Martimpé-Gallart and Henri Gibert. The club came close to reaching the finals of both the Championship and the French Cup but was defeated in the semi-finals on both occasions, losing to the eventual champions, AS Carcassonne (15–3), and XIII Catalan (8–7).

==== 1946-1947: First French Championship Title ====
During the 1946–1947 season, the Roanne team was strengthened by the arrival of René Duffort and continued to rise in power. Roanne's coach, Jean Duhau, who was called upon to build RC Marseille under Paul Ricard, was replaced by former international player Robert Samatan. Samatan renewed his trust in Henri Riu in the front row and occasionally used him in the second row. Roanne had an excellent season, consistently occupying top positions in the Championship standings.

Riu's performances in the club were closely monitored by the French national team selectors for their front row composition. His name was mentioned for the match against Wales in early 1947, but he was ultimately not selected, with Marcel Volot, Denis Martiquet, and Ambroise Ulma preferred for that match. However, Riu's name continued to be mentioned in squad discussions, and he eventually earned his first cap in March 1948, remaining the first replacement for the forward lines.

Winning the regular season of the Championship, R.C. Roanne qualified for the final while their opponents battled through the play-offs. AS Carcassonne, led by Puig Aubert, emerged victorious from the play-offs by defeating FC Lézignan and Entente Bordeaux-Bayonne. As the defending champions, they were favoured to win against Roanne despite going through the playoffs. The final, held at Lyon's municipal stadium, pitted the two best teams of the season, each boasting numerous French internationals. Roanne delivered a flawless performance against a lacklustre Carcassonne side, securing a 19–0 victory with thirteen points from Gaston Comes, who was named the man of the match. H. Riu had a solid game and clinched his first French Championship title.

==== 1947-1948: Second French Championship Title and First International Cap ====
For the 1947–1948 season, Robert Samatan was retained as the coach, but the club experienced the departure of two key players: Gaston Comes and Élie Brousse. Brousse's departure led Samatan to move Henri Riu to the second row, where his understanding of the game could compensate for the physical play without disrupting the team's performance.

While Roanne aimed for another championship with AS Carcassonne and RC Marseille as main competitors, Riu's name circulated within the French national team, although he was not called up for the European Cup. However, he seemed to have a good chance for the New Zealand tour of Europe that winter, alongside Lucien Barris, Joseph Crespo, Puig-Aubert, and Paul Dejean, especially considering his strong performances in the Championship with his club.

Riu's form continued to improve towards the end of the 1948 season, earning him his first call-up to the French national team in March 1948 for a match against Wales on March 20, 1948, in Swansea. This match could be decisive for France's chances of winning the European Cup, setting up an ultimate match against England in April. Riu, preferred over his Roanne teammate Lucien Barris for this selection, maintained his confidence with Roanne, where he remained one of the best players. In this match against Wales, Riu apprehensively adapted to playing as a prop despite operating as a second-row forward for his club throughout the season. However, with support from his Roanne teammates Jean Barreteau, René Duffort, and Pierre Taillantou, he contributed to France's 20–12 victory, with Barreteau scoring 8 points. The French pack dominated their Welsh counterparts, with Riu playing a significant role in the victory. Despite initially being selected for the final match against England, he was ultimately replaced by Ambroise Ulma, denying him a second cap.

Towards the end of the season, Riu played an active role in Roanne's final matches. Despite being eliminated in the quarter-finals of the Coupe de France by AS Carcassonne, Roanne finished second in the Championship's regular season. In the semi-finals, Roanne defeated RC Marseille 16–11 with a composed and mature performance, securing a place in the final. The final, held at the Vélodrome stadium in Marseille, saw Roanne face Carcassonne. Despite trailing 2–0 at halftime, Roanne capitalized on playing against the wind in the second half, winning the match 3–2 with a crucial try from Pierre Taillantou. Riu delivered an outstanding performance, contributing to Roanne's second consecutive French Championship title.

==== 1948-1949: Catalan Triumph against Australia and Second International Cap ====
The 1948–1949 season for RC Roanne was marked by difficulties due to injuries plaguing the squad, including key players like Robert Dauger, René Duffort, and Roger Pouy, forcing coach Robert Samatan to constantly adjust his starting thirteen, coupled with the departure of quality players such as Raymond Contrastin, Henri Gibert, and Lucien Barris.

Despite the challenges, H. Riu retained his place in the Roanne squad, where he performed well at the beginning of the season and was under consideration for French national team call-ups in the fall of 1948. However, Gabriel Berthomieu was ultimately preferred over him for the match against Wales in the European Cup.

The end of 1948 and the beginning of 1949 witnessed the tour of the Australian team to France. Prior to this, on December 29, 1948, they faced the Catalan selection in Perpignan, captained by Paul Dejean, with H. Riu selected without hesitation. The Catalans surprised the Australians, winning 20–5 in front of nearly 12,000 spectators.

For the double-header in January 1949 between France and Australia, H. Riu did not participate in the first match in Marseille. However, an injury to prop André Béraud in that match led to Riu being called up to play in the French forwards as a second-row forward for the second match. Alongside two other Catalans, Ambroise Ulma and Ulysse Négrier, following their victory in the Catalan selection against the same opponent. Despite a hard-fought encounter, the French forwards showcased their resilience, but France lost the match 10–0. This marked his second and final French cap. It was noted by the sports press that while his performances for his club under R. Samatan's guidance demonstrated authority and initiative, they were not replicated in the French team due to tactical differences where he was less supported in his movements.

In both the Championship and the Coupe de France, RC Roanne was considered a contender for both titles. H. Riu was present in the front row for the Coupe de France semi-final at the Parc des Princes in Paris against AS Carcassonne, lost 21–6 in a match where Roanne had to play with ten men at times due to injuries to Jean Barreteau and Rodeila, among others. The following week, RC Roanne faced RC Marseille in the Championship semi-final. The Marseille team, in dazzling form and buoyed by the partnership of Jean Dop and Paul Césard, handed Roanne a 22–0 defeat, marking their worst performance of the season and concluding their campaign with two semi-final eliminations.

=== 1949-1953: Henri Riu at U.S. Lyon-Villeurbanne ===
==== 1949: Move to U.S. Lyon-Villeurbanne ====
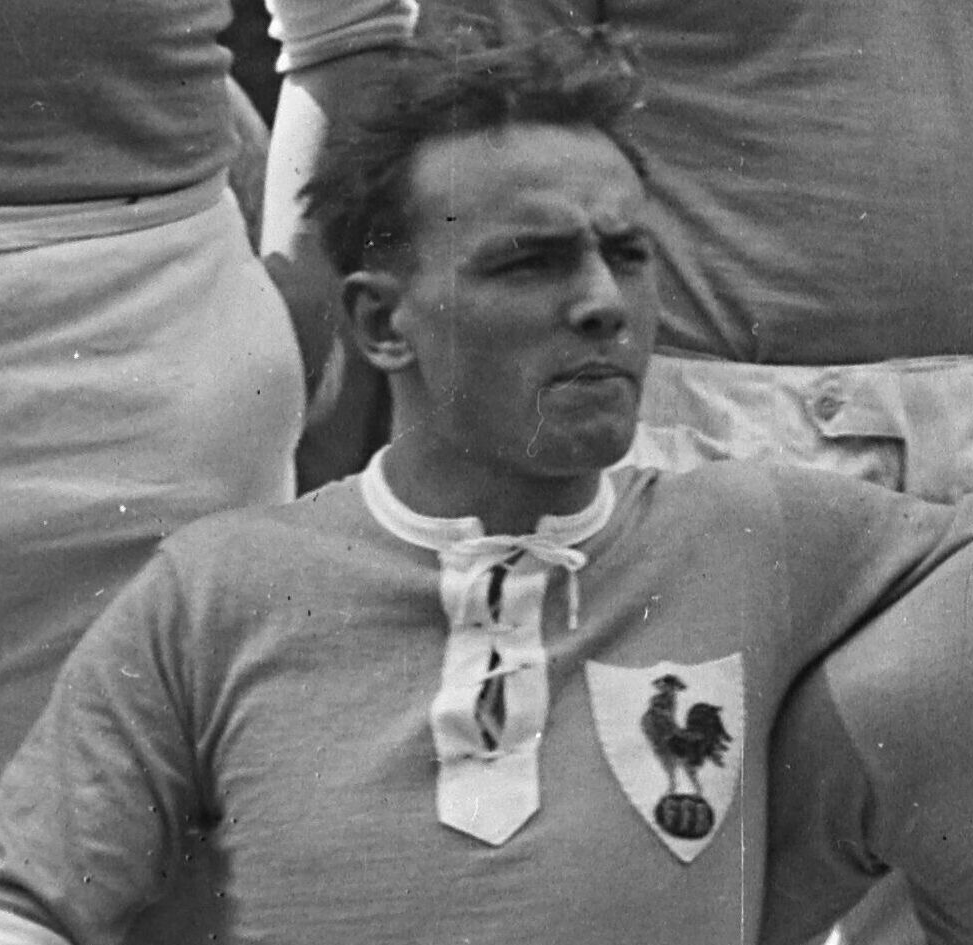
Robert Samatan coached Henri Riu at R.C. Roanne and later at U.S. Lyon-Villeurbanne, with whom he achieved many successes.

RC Roanne underwent significant changes during the offseason. Claudius Devernois, the club's president who had financially supported it for fifteen years, noted the budget deficit that he had been covering each season. Additionally, there was discontent among the management, and ticket revenues fell short of targets. In collaboration with the French Federation, he was encouraged to focus efforts on the Lyon region and take over U.S. Lyon-Villeurbanne, located in a "revenue-generating area." This transfer was finalized in September 1949, with many players, including Henri Riu, following suit, along with Jean Audoubert, René Duffort, Pierre Taillantou, Joseph Crespo, and their coach Robert Samatan. The integration of numerous players into this new club raised questions about whether homogeneity would be easy to achieve.

The early matches dispelled any doubts about this Lyon team, which quickly positioned itself at the top of the Championship standings and was potentially recognized as a candidate for national titles. Henri Riu remained on the radar of the French national team selectors, as evidenced by his call-up to the "Rest of France" team, which served as a reserve for the French team, in November 1949.

In both the Championship and the Coupe de France, the Lyon club continued its impressive performances, notably defeating the leader XIII Catalan in December 1949, RC Marseille in March 1950, and especially AS Carcassonne, led by Puig Aubert, in the Coupe de France round of 16 with a score of 13–8. Henri Riu and his Lyon teammates faced AS Carcassonne again in the Championship semi-finals. Despite their victory in the Coupe de France encounter, U.S. Lyon-Villeurbanne was held to a 3–3 draw in October 1949 and suffered a 15–0 defeat in December 1949 against Carcassonne. The match was evenly balanced until the hour mark (0–0 at halftime) before Carcassonne, in a heated atmosphere, emerged victorious with a score of 10–6. Henri Riu did not participate in the Coupe de France final against XIII Catalan, held in Perpignan, which they lost 12–5, concluding the 1949–1950 season without a title. Finally, before the decisive matches at the end of the season, he participated in the Catalans-Basques encounter for a propaganda match in Carcassonne, won by the Catalans 38–23.

==== 1950-1951: French Champion with Lyon ====
At the age of 30, Henri Riu started this new season on the banks of the Rhône with U.S. Lyon-Villeurbanne, which claimed its status as a contender for national titles, strengthened by the arrivals of players like Roger Rey or Hugues Baldassin, among others. The Lyon club began the season well and confirmed its ambition. Henri Riu remained an undisputed starter in the Lyon team, rotating between different forward positions.

In the semi-final of the French Championship, Lyon faced AS Carcassonne in Perpignan. Lyon surprised the favoured Carcassonne team, winning 16–11, and secured a spot in the final against XIII Catalan in Toulouse. XIII Catalan was also considered a favourite against Lyon. However, Lyon XIII ultimately clinched the title with a 15–10 victory, scoring all their points in the second half (XIII Catalan led 5–0 at halftime) with five tries. This marked Henri Riu's third French Championship title. The following week, in the Coupe de France semi-final, the two teams met again for a rematch, despite Carrère's absence from the Catalan side, replaced by Ascola. In a repeat of the final, the scenario seemed to repeat itself, with the Catalans dominating for 50 minutes only to lose more convincingly this time, 18–2. Lyon was on track for an unprecedented double, although Henri Riu did not participate due to a knee injury. This final, held in Marseille, positioned Lyon as the favorite this time, considering their end-of-season form against AS Carcassonne. In this final, which Henri Riu did not contest, Lyon led 10–9 with twelve minutes remaining before letting Carcassonne pull away and win 22–10.

==== 1951-1953: End of Career as a Substitute at Lyon ====
Henri Riu remained part of the U.S. Lyon-Villeurbanne team for two more years until 1953. He was less utilized than before within the Lyon club due to the presence of great forwards, including Joseph Krawczyk from Lyon O.U., who joined as a prop, relegating Henri Riu to a backup role. However, he still participated in matches in the absence of a starter, especially as a prop. After a season marked by two semi-final eliminations in the Championship and Coupe de France in 1952, U.S. Lyon-Villeurbanne reached both finals in the 1953 season. The first final was lost 19–12 against AS Carcassonne in the Championship, and the second was won 9–8 against U.S. Villeneuve in the Coupe de France, finals in which Henri Riu did not participate.

=== Post-career ===
Once his sports retirement was confirmed, Henri Riu stepped away from the fields, did not join any coaching staff, and did not hold any positions within a club except for a brief stint at the Moulins Rugby League club for one year. However, he participated in the creation of the Friendly Aid Society of Former Rugby League Players from Roanne with Pierre Taillantou and Joseph Crespo. He died on January 24, 2014, in Roanne.

== Bibliography ==
- Passamar, André (1984). L'Encyclopédie de Treize Magazine (in French). Treize Magazine. OCLC 461737232.
- Bonnery, Louis (1996). Le rugby à XIII : le plus français du monde (in French). Cano & Frank. OCLC 45029080.
- Arcas, Denis (2019). Rugby à XIII : Il était une fois … Le rugby de Liberté : 1933-1941, de la naissance à l'interdiction (in French). Les Éditions du Net. ISBN 9782312065854.
- Rugby XIII - 1934-2004 - 70 ans (in French). France Graphic. 2004.
