= Jean Barreteau =

France international rugby league & union player

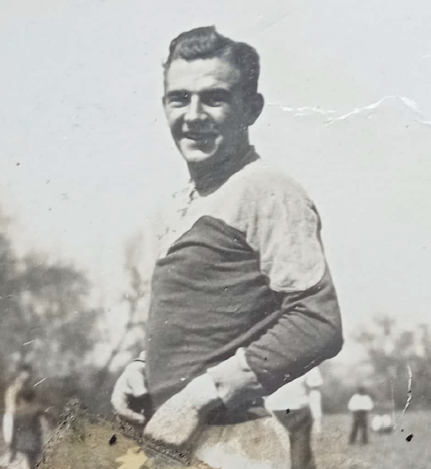

Personal information
- Born: Jean Ernest Francois Barreteau; 16 June 1922 Lasserre, Lot-et-Garonne, France
- Died: 24 July 2010 (aged 88) Agen, France

Playing information

Rugby union
Club
Years	Team	Pld	T	G	FG	P
193?	U.S. Nérac
1945	U.S. Fumel
	Total	0	0	0	0	0

Rugby league
- Position: Fullback
Club
Years	Team	Pld	T	G	FG	P
1945–49	R.C. Roanne
1949	Toulouse Olympique
1949–55	Lavardac XIII
	Total	0	0	0	0	0
Representative
Years	Team	Pld	T	G	FG	P
1948–49	France	4

Coaching information
Club
Years	Team	Gms	W	D	L	W%
1949–5?	Lavardac XIII

Jean Barreteau (June 16, 1922 – July 24, 2010) was a French rugby union player and a French rugby league international, primarily playing as a fullback.

He began playing rugby union at a young age with U.S. Nérac, joining their first team at the age of fifteen. During World War II, he was enlisted in the Youth Work Camps, and upon his return, he joined the U.S. Fumel Club, where he played alongside Pierre Taillantou and Gaston Combes. Barreteau enjoyed sporting success with this club at the end of the war, reaching the semi-finals of the French Championship in 1945, although they lost to S.U. Agen.

Spotted by Roanne executive Claude Devernois, who aimed to revive the rugby league club R.C. Roanne after the ban on rugby league in France by the Vichy regime, Barreteau switched to rugby league on the banks of the Loire with Taillantou. Over four seasons, he became one of the most notable players in the French Championship, primarily as a fullback for his club, only challenged in the national team by Puig Aubert. He earned four national team selections and won the European Nations Cup title in 1949. Additionally, he won two French Championship titles in 1947 and 1948. At the peak of his sporting career, R.C. Roanne went into hiatus, leading him to sign with Toulouse Olympique XIII in 1949, but the club withdrew from all competition after a few months. At the age of 26, Barreteau retired from professional rugby and joined Lavardac XIII as a player-coach, achieving success with three second-division titles in 1951, 1953, and 1955. Over nearly a decade, he guided the club to numerous amateur rugby league titles before it merged with U.S. Nérac and transitioned to rugby union.

In his honour, the sports stadium in Lavardac bears his name.

== Early life ==
Jean Ernest François Barreteau was born on June 16, 1922, in Lasserre, Lot-et-Garonne. His father, Jean-Marie François Barreteau (born on September 6, 1889, in La Garnache, and died on March 4, 1966, in Nérac), was a farmer, and his mother, Lucie-Marie-Rose Roué (born on June 23, 1898, in Herbignac, and died on November 24, 1988, in Nérac), was also involved in farming. They resided in the town of Nérac, in the locality called Nazareth. He had a sister, Yvonne, who died at the age of sixteen.

Jean Barreteau took up rugby union from a young age in the neighboring town of Nérac, where he grew up. He joined the U.S. Nérac club, and at just fifteen years old, he was already playing matches with the first team. At the age of twenty, he was obliged to join the Youth Work Camps during World War II and spent some time in Germany.

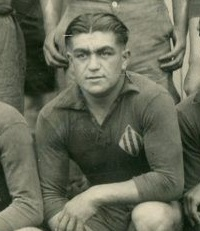
Gaston Combes, teammate at US Fumel and a prominent scrum-half after the war.

Upon his return, the U.S. Fumel club, under the guidance of Jean Vissol, assembled a formidable team during the war and recruited Barreteau. He gradually established himself and became a regular fullback with success, relying on standout teammates such as Pierre Taillantou and Gaston Combes, which enabled U.S. Fumel to compete at the top levels of the French Rugby Union Championship. The club reached the semi-finals in the 1945 edition, losing to S.U. Agen, led by Jean Matheu-Cambas and Guy Basquet, the eventual champions, with a harsh score of 16-0. In the same year, they also reached the quarter-finals of the Coupe de France, where they were defeated by Aviron Bayonnais, led by Jean Dauger, André Alvarez, and Maurice Celhay, with a score of 8-7.

== Rugby league career ==
=== 1945: Departure to rugby league (XIII) and R.C. Roanne with Pierre Taillantou ===
In the 1945-1946 season, Jean Barreteau began with U.S. Fumel, hoping to replicate his previous successes as a fullback. However, the season started with a setback for U.S. Fumel as one of their key players, scrum-half Gaston Combes, departed for rugby league and joined R.C. Albigeois. This departure significantly handicapped the team. Barreteau's performances drew the attention of rugby league officials, who convinced him to switch codes in December 1945, despite offers from S.U. Agen and A.S. Montferrand.

Through Roannais leader Claude Devernois's initiative to revive R.C. Roanne's rugby league club, Barreteau joined them along with his teammate Pierre Taillantou. Their addition strengthened a team that was already competing at the top of the French Rugby League Championship. Coached by Jean Duhau, the team included notable players like Robert Joly and Catalans Henri Riu, Joseph Crespo, Élie Brousse, and Gaston Comes, as well as pre-war returnees Robert Dauger, Vincent Martimpé-Gallart, and Henri Gibert.

R.C. Roanne reached the semi-finals of both the French Championship and the Coupe de France but was defeated at that stage by AS Carcassonne (15-3) and XIII Catalan (8-7) respectively.

=== 1946-1947: First French championship title ===
In the 1946-1947 season, R.C. Roanne strengthened its squad with the arrival of René Duffort. Coach Jean Duhau, who was tasked with building R.C. Marseille, was replaced by former international player Robert Samatan. Barreteau continued to excel as one of the best fullbacks in the Championship, sparking discussions about a possible call-up to the French national team. Despite finishing second in the regular season, R.C. Roanne qualified for the final. They faced A.S. Carcassonne, the defending champions, in the title decider. R.C. Roanne secured victory with a flawless performance, winning 19-0, with Barreteau playing a pivotal role in their success.

=== 1947-1948: Second French championship title and international caps ===
In the 1947-1948 season, Barreteau remained a key player for R.C. Roanne despite a knee injury at the start of the season. He was considered for selection to the French national team, and in January 1948, he made his international debut against New Zealand, contributing significantly to France's victory. Despite a loss to England in his second international appearance, Barreteau's club performances remained strong. R.C. Roanne clinched their second consecutive French Championship title, defeating A.S. Carcassonne in the final.

=== 1948-1949: Final Season at Roanne and final French caps ===
The 1948-1949 season was challenging for R.C. Roanne due to injuries and player departures. Barreteau continued to be a valuable asset for both his club and the national team, earning further international caps. However, injuries affected his performances, and despite his efforts, France suffered defeats to England and Australia. Barreteau's club, R.C. Roanne, also faced disappointments, exiting both the French Championship and the Coupe de France in the semi-finals.

=== 1949: Interlude at Toulouse Olympique XIII and return to amateurism at Lavardac ===
Following significant changes in the offseason, R.C. Roanne underwent a major transformation. President Claudius Devernois, who had been financially supporting the club for fifteen years, noticed a budget deficit that he had been compensating for each season. Additionally, there was discontent among the management, and ticket revenues fell short of expectations. In consultation with the French Federation, Devernois was advised to focus efforts on the Lyon region and take over U.S. Lyon-Villeurbanne, located in a more lucrative area. This transfer was finalized in September 1949, with several players, including Joseph Crespo, Jean Audoubert, René Duffort, Pierre Taillantou, and Henri Riu, along with their coach Robert Samatan, moving to Lyon-Villeurbanne. However, Jean Barreteau did not join them and instead obtained a license with Toulouse Olympique XIII, where he played alongside Vincent Cantoni. Barreteau's stint at Toulouse was short-lived due to organizational challenges within the club, which had experienced three different presidents in the past two seasons and withdrew from competitions in March 1950.

After his time in Toulouse, Barreteau took charge of U.S. Lavardac, where he found promising players like Marius Guiral's son and the brothers Gérard and Gilbert Dautant. Serving as player-coach, Barreteau led the team to success in the French Rugby League Championship's second division, winning titles in 1951 against Orange, in 1953 against La Réole XIII, and in 1955 against Facture. The team also reached the final in 1952, albeit losing to Facture. Additionally, Barreteau contributed to the coaching staff of U.S. Villeneuve during the 1950s. The Lavardac club achieved notable performances in the French Cup, reaching the quarter-finals in 1952 against U.S. Lyon-Villeurbanne and the round of 16 in 1953 against F.C. Lézignan. During this period, Serge Lassoujade, a future French rugby union international, made his rugby debut under Barreteau's guidance.

== Post playing years ==
In the 1960s, Jean Barreteau ran the Café Suisse in Lavardac, a popular meeting spot for rugby players after matches. In recognition of his contributions to the sport, a stadium in Lavardac was named after him, where the rugby union club U.S. Lavardac Barbaste plays. He died on July 24, 2010, in Agen.

== See also ==
- List of France national rugby league team players

== Bibliography ==
- Passamar, André (1984). L'Encyclopédie de Treize Magazine (in French). Treize Magazine. OCLC 461737232.
- Bonnery, Louis (1996). Le rugby à XIII : le plus français du monde (in French). Cano & Frank. OCLC 45029080.
- Racing Club de Roanne 13 (2004). Rugby XIII - 1934-2004 - 70 ans (in French). France Graphic.
