= 1943–44 French Rugby Union Championship =

- Countries: France
- Champions: Perpignan
- Runners-up: Bayonne

The 1943–44 French Rugby Union Championship was won by Perpignan that beat Bayonne in the final.

The championship was played by 96 team divided in twelve pools of eight, The first two of each pool was admitted to second round. In the second round, the 24 teams were divided in four pools of six, The first two of each poll were admitted the quarter of finals.

== Context ==
The Coupe de France was won by le Toulouse OEC that beat the SBUC in the finals.

== Semifinals ==
mar. 1944	Perpignan	-	Montferrand	9 - 4
mar. 1944	Bayonne	-	Toulouse OEC	17 - 3

== Final ==
Équipes	Perpignan - Bayonne
Score	20-5
Date	26 March 1944
Stade	Parc des Princes, Paris
Referee	Louis Murail
Line-up
Perpignan	Louis Carrère, Albert Conte, Michel Trilles, Lucien Barris, Ambroise Ulma, Jacques Palat, Jean Barande, Marcel Blanc, Joseph Crespo, Hubert Marty, Fernand Got, Jean Teulière, Joseph Desclaux, Frédéric Trescazes, Robert Puig-Aubert
Bayonne	Sébastien Carvalho, Ricardo Perez, Jean Casteigt, Jean Dumas, Louis Bizauta, Pierre Labèque, Félix Boudon, André Goutenègre, Jean Dubalen, Michel Salinas, E.Elissalde, Maurice Celhay, Jean Dauger, Pierre Larre, André Alvarez.
Scorer
Perpignan	6 tries: Trilles, Conte, Teulière, Got, Desclaux, Trescazes; 1 conversion Puig-Aubert
Bayonne	1 try Dauger; 1 conversion Elissalde

The start of the match was delayed due an air raid alarm.

After this match many players left the Perpignan to play Rugby league.
