= Michael Condon =

Mike Condon or Michael Condon is the name of:

- Mike Condon (rugby), a Welsh rugby player
- Mike Condon (ice hockey), an American ice hockey goaltender
- Michael Condon Memorial Award, named after an American Hockey League linesman

== See also ==
- Michael Condron, actor
