= Roger Guilhem =

France international rugby league footballer

Personal information
- Born: 17 December 1924 Carcassonne, France
- Died: 10 May 2009 (aged 84) Carcassonne, France

Playing information
- Position: Five-eighth Loose forward
Club
Years	Team	Pld	T	G	FG	P
19??–??	AS Carcassonne
Representative
Years	Team	Pld	T	G	FG	P
1949–54	France	7	?	0	0	3
- Source: As of 17 January 2021

Roger Guilhem (17 December 1924 – 10 May 2009) was a French former professional rugby league footballer who represented France at the 1954 Rugby League World Cup, as a stand-off or loose forward. He was nicknamed La pieuvre (The octopus).

== Career ==
In 1944, at just 19 years old, Roger Guilhem became Junior French Rugby Union Champion with ASC (Association Sportive Carcassonnaise), before switching codes to rugby league and winning multiple national titles with AS Carcassonne.

Guilhem, then playing for AS Carcassonne, was called up to represent France in the 1951 tour of Australia and New Zealand and the 1954 Rugby League World Cup played in France. He took part only in a match during the tournament and was in the bench during the final against Great Britain, the latter winning the tournament.

== Honours ==
- World Cup :
  - Runner-up - 1954 (France).
- European Nations Cup :
  - 2 times champion in 1949 and 1952 (France).
- French Championship :
  - 4 times champion in 1946,1950, 1952 and 1953 (Carcassonne).
  - 5 times finalist in 1947, 1948, 1949, 1955 and 1956 (Carcassonne).
- Lord Derby Cup :
  - 4 times champion in1946 and 1947, 1951 and 1952 (Carcassonne).
  - 1 time finalist in 1948 and 1949 (Carcassonne).
