= Mike Condon =

Mike Condon may refer to:

- Mike Condon (ice hockey) (born 1990), American ice hockey goaltender
- Michael Condon (1919–1960), Welsh rugby footballer
