= Joseph Krawczyk =

Joseph Krawczyk may refer to:

- Joseph Krawczyk (rugby league) (1926-2010), French rugby league player
- Joseph L. Krawczyk Jr. (born 1947), American politician
