= Mike Condon (rugby) =

Wales international rugby league footballer & coach

Personal information
- Full name: Michael James Condon
- Born: 15 April 1919 Swansea, Wales
- Died: 29 July 1960 (aged 41) Halifax, England

Playing information

Rugby union
Club
Years	Team	Pld	T	G	FG	P
	Swansea RFC

Rugby league
- Position: Prop
Club
Years	Team	Pld	T	G	FG	P
1948–53	Halifax	146	4	0	0	12
Representative
Years	Team	Pld	T	G	FG	P
1952–53	Wales	3

Coaching information
Club
Years	Team	Gms	W	D	L	W%
1955	Batley

Michael James Condon (15 April 1919 – 29 July 1960) was a Welsh rugby union and professional rugby league footballer who played in the 1940s and 1950s, and coached rugby league in the 1950s. He played club level rugby union (RU) for Swansea RFC, and representative level rugby league (RL) for Wales, and at club level for Halifax, as a prop, and coached club level rugby league (RL) for Batley.

== Background ==
Mike Condon was born in Swansea, Wales, and he died aged 41 in Halifax, England.

== Playing career ==
=== International honours ===
Mike Condon won 3 caps for Wales (RL) while at Halifax, he played at prop in the 12–20 defeat by France in the 1951–52 European Championship match at Stade Chaban-Delmas, Bordeaux on Sunday 6 April 1952, he played at prop in the 8–19 defeat by England in the 1952–53 European Championship match at Central Park, Wigan on Wednesday 17 September 1952, and played at prop in the 18–16 victory over Other Nationalities in the 1952–53 European Championship match at Wilderspool Stadium, Warrington on Wednesday 15 April 1953.

== Coaching career ==
Condon was the coach of Batley from April 1955 to September 1955.
