= Gabriel Berthomieu =

Former France international rugby league footballer

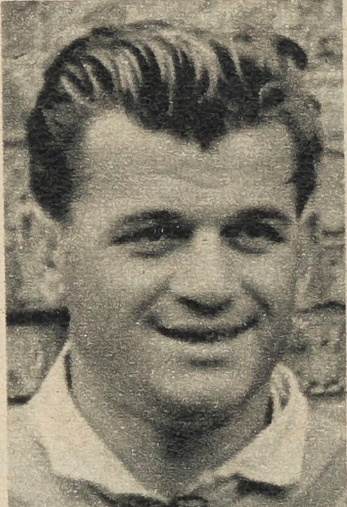

Personal information
- Born: 15 February 1924; Graulhet, Tarn, Occitania, France
- Died: 7 June 1997 (aged 73); Albi, France

Playing information
- Height: 1.78 m (5 ft 10 in)
- Weight: 97 kg (15 st 4 lb)

Rugby union
- Position: Lock
Club
Years	Team	Pld	T	G	FG	P
19??–??	Graulhet

Rugby league
- Position: Second-row
Club
Years	Team	Pld	T	G	FG	P
19??–??	Albi
Representative
Years	Team	Pld	T	G	FG	P
1946–57	France	39	1	0	0	3

Gabriel Berthomieu, known also by his nickname Hugues, (born in Graulhet, 15 February 1924- Albi, 6 July 1997) was a French rugby league and union player who played as second row.

1,78 metres tall and weighing 97kg, he started as lock for Sporting Club Graulhétois and later, switched codes to league playing for Racing Club Albi. He also represented France at the 1957 Rugby League World Cup.

== Rugby union career ==
=== Club ===
- SC Graulhet

=== Honours ===
- Junior French Champion for SC Graulhet

Junior representative (Pyrénées-Béarn-Bigorre)

== Rugby league career ==
=== Club ===
- Albi XIII

=== Honours ===
- French Champion with Albi in 1956 and 1958

=== France national team ===
- International (39 caps) 1946-1949, 1951-1953, 1955-1957
- 2 Australia and New Zealand tours in 1955 and 1957
- Champion of the European Cup of Nations : 1949 and 1952 (France).

He was also Captain for France during certain matches.
