= Michel Lopez =

Michel Lopez may refer to:

- Michel Lopez (Aruban footballer) (born 1972), Aruban football defensive midfielder
- Michel López (boxer) (born 1976), Cuban boxer

== See also ==
- Michael López (disambiguation)
