= St Helen's Rugby and Cricket Ground =

Rugby ground in Swansea

- Maes Rygbi a Chriced St Helen
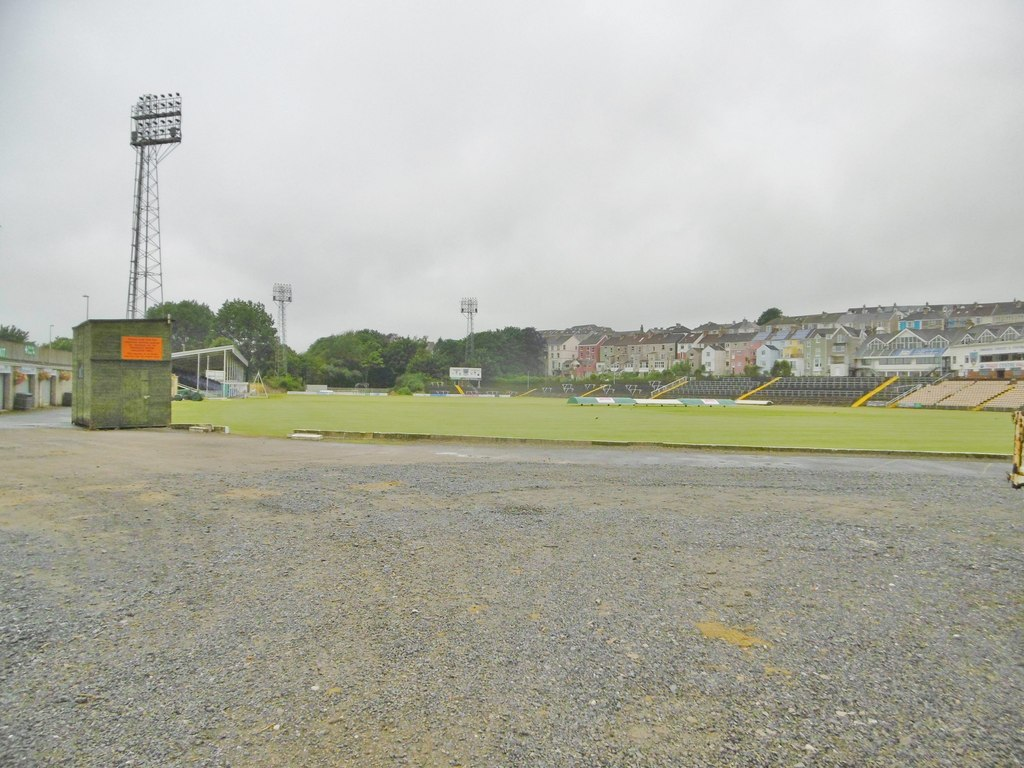
- Interactive map of St Helen's Rugby and Cricket Ground
- Location: Brynmill, Swansea, SA2 0AR
- Coordinates: 51°36′45″N 3°57′56″W
- Owner: City and County of Swansea Council
- Operator: Swansea Council
- Capacity: 8,396
- Surface: Grass
- Record attendance: 50,000 (Wales vs Ireland, 1930 Five Nations Championship, 8 March 1930)

Construction
- Groundbreaking: 1873
- Opened: 1873
- Renovated: 2024-2025

Tenants
- Swansea RFC; Swansea University RFC; Ospreys (rugby union)

Ground information
- Country: Wales

International information
- First men's ODI: 18 July 1973: England v New Zealand
- Last men's ODI: 9 June 1983: Pakistan v Sri Lanka
- Only women's ODI: 21 July 1973: Australia v International XI

Team information
Glamorgan	(1890 – 2019)
Swansea Cricket Club	(1873 – 2025)
Ospreys (rugby union)	(2003 – 2005, 2026 – present)
Swansea RFC	(1876 – present)
- As of 22 May 2025; Source: Cricinfo

St Helen's Rugby Stadium, commonly known as St Helen's, is a sports venue in Swansea, Wales, owned and operated by the City and County of Swansea Council. Used for rugby union, and historically cricket. It was previously the joint home of Swansea's Cricket Club and semi-professional side Swansea RFC in the Super Rygbi Cymru competition. In October 2026, it became the home of the Ospreys, who returned to the ground after 20 years, moving from the Swansea.com Stadium.

== History ==
Since the ground opened in 1873, the ground has hosted rugby union, cricket and football matches, and has been the home of the Swansea Rugby Football Club, and the Swansea Cricket Club.

Swansea Cricket Club established itself at the ground in 1875, followed by Swansea RFC in 1876. This began a remarkable sporting history that has seen the venue host some of the biggest names, teams and moments in rugby and cricket. The ground St Helen's was the venue for the first home match of the Wales national team in 1882, and still holds the record attendance of 50,000 for a rugby union international.

At the ground, Swansea RFC defeated Australia 6–0 in 1908 and South Africa 3–0 in 1912, before producing perhaps its most celebrated result in 1935, when Swansea beat New Zealand 11–3 to become the first club side to defeat the All Blacks. St Helen’s continued to host Wales internationals until 1954 and later welcomed Wales back for a full international against Tonga in 1997.

In cricket, Glamorgan County Cricket Club regularly used St Helen's from 1921 to 2019. The ground has staged two One Day Internationals: England against New Zealand in 1973, and a 1983 World Cup match between Pakistan and Sri Lanka. St. Helen's was the location of Sir Garfield Sobers's six sixes in a single over in first-class cricket, the maximum possible runs in a single over, and the first time it had been done. In July 2024, Glamorgan announced it would not be returning to use the ground having not played there since 2019.

The ground saw wins for Glamorgan over South Africa in 1951 and Australia in both 1964 and 1968.

Beyond rugby and cricket, St Helen’s has also hosted football internationals, including Wales v Ireland in 1894, as well as rugby league, athletics, boxing, cycling, hockey and tennis. After more than a century and a half, Swansea Cricket Club's association with the ground ended in 2025, while rugby continues to write the next chapter of its story. Few sporting venues can match St Helen’s for the combination of longevity, international history and iconic sporting moments that have taken place on its pitch.

St Helen's has also staged international matches in two other sports. In rugby league, Wales played thirteen matches at the ground between 1945 and 1978, two of which were part of the 1975 World Cup tournament. A football international between Wales and Ireland took place at St Helen's in 1894.

In June 1928 the ground was the venue of a mile race, for Swansea Grammar School's Sports Day, won by a teenage Dylan Thomas; he carried a newspaper photograph of his victory with him until his death.

In modern history, the ground remained Swansea RFC's home in professional rugby, before the formation of the Ospreys in 2003, which saw the now professional region share games with The Gnoll in Neath. Eventually, the Ospreys left St Helens in 2005, moving to then newly opened Liberty Stadium along side Swansea City.

In 2005, the venue could hold an audience of 10,500 seated before it was re-developed. The famous east stand, which had provided cloisters over part of Oystermouth Road, has since been demolished and replaced with a metallic stand unloved by locals. In late November 2007, the ground's perimeter wall in the South East corner, next to Mumbles Road and Gorse Lane, was knocked down and a new wall built further inside the ground, in similar style to the old wall. This was to accommodate a new car park with 39 spaces for the Patti Pavilion.

In the summer of 2024, after ongoing discussions between the Ospreys and the city council of Swansea, it was decided the Welsh rugby region would return to St Helen's for the 2025/26 rugby season, later delayed to 2026/27, and as a result, they would replace Swansea Cricket Club as the main tenants. Swansea RFC and Swansea University RFC will continue to play rugby in the stadium.

The final cricket match was played on 31 August 2025, where Swansea seconds played Pontardawe in a first XI fixture.

In October 2026, the Ospreys returned to St Helen's after 20 years in a United Rugby Championship fixture against fellow Welsh side Dragons. The game ended in a 31—14 Ospreys victory.

== Rugby ==
The first home international in the history of Welsh rugby was played at St Helen's on 16 December 1882, against England. The ground was the scene of New Zealand's first victory over Wales in 1924. On 10 April 1954, St. Helen's staged its last international until a Test match between Wales and Tonga was also played at the ground in 1997. The decision to abandon Swansea as an international rugby union venue in the 1950s was prompted by overstretch of what was then a 50,000-capacity ground; delays for players and spectators travelling west along the A48, especially at Port Talbot; and higher revenues from games at Cardiff Arms Park. Swansea Corporation discussed raising the capacity to 70,000 or even 82,000, but wartime bomb damage inflicted on the city forced a revision of building priorities. However, the ground has been used to host three Welsh women's internationals. The first women's international at Swansea was in April 1999 against England, and the most recent was in November 2009 when Wales defeated Sweden 56–7.

Swansea RFC defeated New Zealand 11–3 at St Helen's on 28 September 1935, becoming the first club side to beat the All Blacks. Swansea also defeated world champions Australia 21–6 in November 1992, when Australia played their first match of their Welsh Tour.

Between 1919 and 1952, St Helen's was also the home of Swansea Uplands RFC until the club sought its new home in Upper Killay.

During the 1975 Rugby League World Cup, Australia defeated Wales 18–6 in front of 11,112 fans (this match was broadcast throughout the United Kingdom by the BBC). The two sides again played at Swansea as part of the 1978 Kangaroo tour with the Kangaroos winning 8-3 before a crowd of 4,250.

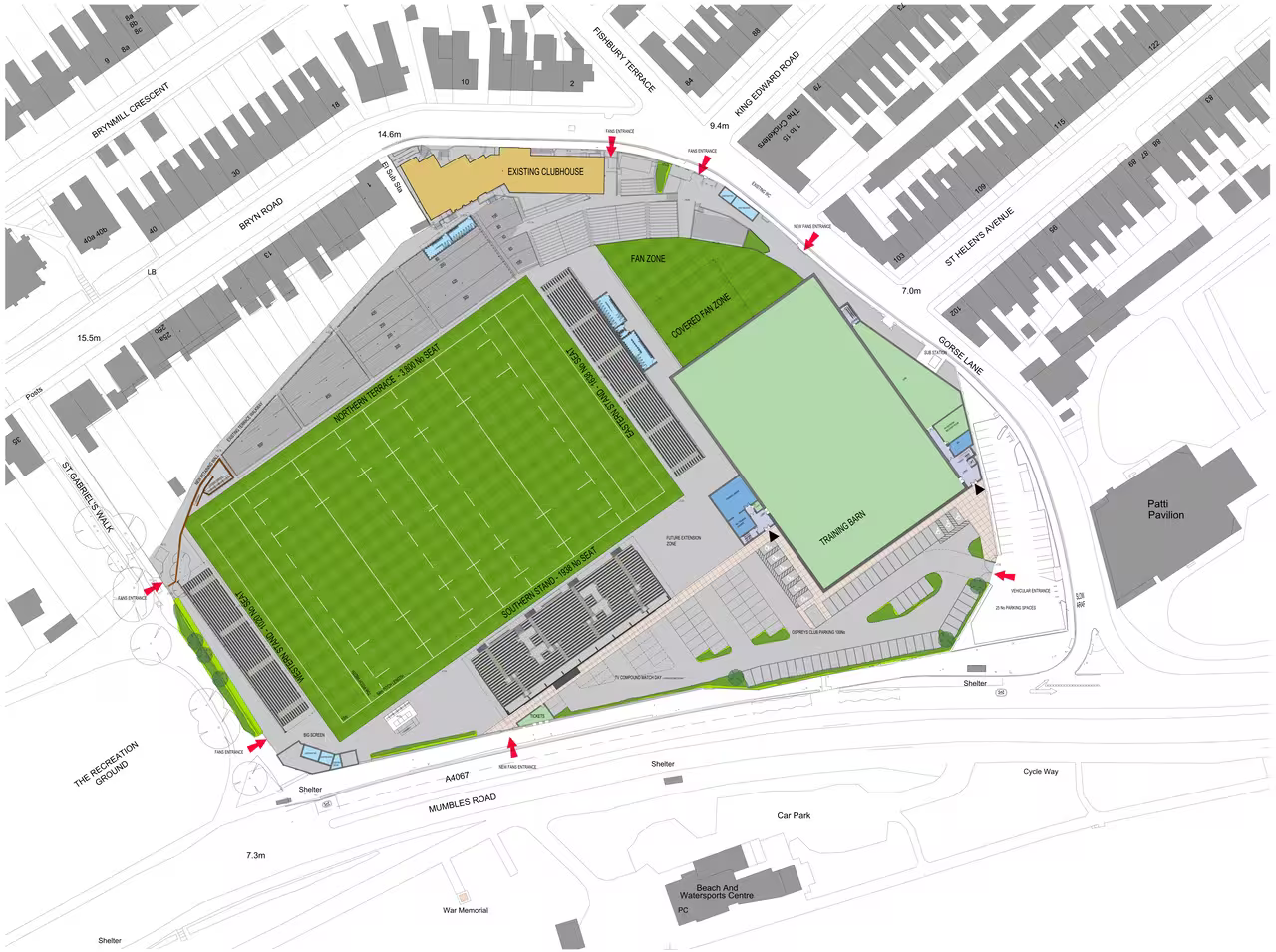
Full Phase 1 and Phase 2 plan for St Helens Rugby and Cricket Ground reconstruction

In July 2024, it was announced that the Ospreys would leave the Swansea.com Stadium after 20 years and return to play in the newly redeveloped St Helen's. As part of the reconfiguration of the ground, it was also announced that the Swansea Cricket Club would leave the home they had occupied since 1875. The Ospreys' return to St Helen's was in a United Rugby Championship fixture against Dragons. The game finished 31—14 to the Ospreys.

=== Rugby league internationals ===
List of international rugby league matches played at St Helen's.

Game#	Date	Result	Attendance	Notes
1	24 November 1945	Wales def. England 26–10	30,000	1945–46 European Rugby League Championship
2	16 November 1946	England def. Wales 19–5	25,000	1946–47 European Rugby League Championship
3	12 April 1947	Wales def. France 12–5	12,000	1946–47 European Rugby League Championship
4	18 October 1947	New Zealand def. Wales 28–20	18,283	1947–48 New Zealand tour
5	6 December 1947	England def. Wales 18–7	10,000	1947–48 European Rugby League Championship
6	20 March 1948	France def. Wales 20–12	6,462	1948–49 European Rugby League Championship
7	20 November 1948	Australia def. Wales 12–5	9,224	1948–49 Kangaroo tour
8	5 February 1949	Wales def. England 14–10	9,553	1948–49 European Rugby League Championship
9	31 March 1951	Other Nationalities def. Wales 27–21	5,000	1950–51 European Rugby League Championship
10	16 February 1975	Wales def. France 21–8	23,000	1975 European Rugby League Championship
11	19 October 1975	Australia def. Wales 18–6	11,112	1975 Rugby League World Cup
12	2 November 1975	Wales def. New Zealand 25–24	2,645	1975 Rugby League World Cup
13	15 October 1978	Australia def. Wales 8–3	4,250	1978 Kangaroo tour

== Football ==
List of Wales International football matches played at St Helen's.

Date	Opponent	Result	Attendance	Notes
24 February 1894	Ireland	4-1	7,000	Played as part of the 1893-94 British Home Championship

== Cricket ==
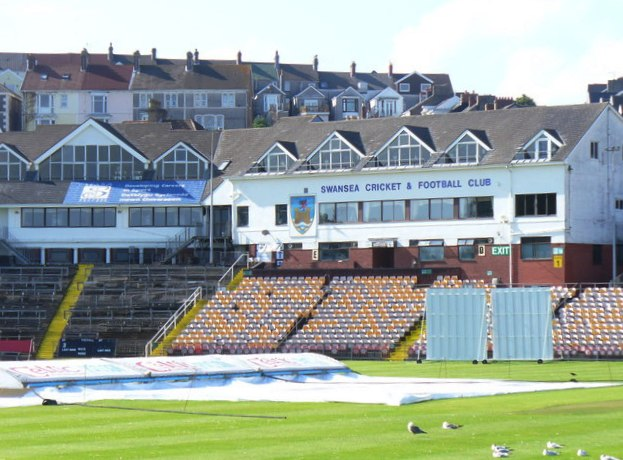
Cricket pavilion

It was in this ground in 1968 that Garfield Sobers hit the first six sixes in one over in first-class cricket. Sobers was playing as captain of Nottinghamshire against Glamorgan.

As part of their commitment to the entire country of Wales, Glamorgan County Cricket Club play some of their home matches at St Helen's, as well as their regular home ground, SWALEC Stadium in Cardiff, and Penrhyn Avenue in Rhos-on-Sea.

Wales Minor Counties Cricket Club, who have played minor counties cricket since 1988, use the ground as a home base. They are currently the only non-English team in the Minor Counties Championship.

=== International centuries ===
A single ODI century has been scored at the venue.

No.	Score	Player	Team	Balls	Opposing team	Date	Result
1	100	Dennis Amiss	England	121	New Zealand	18 July 1973	Won

== Redevelopment ==
With the Ospreys and rugby union becoming the main tenants at the ground, it was announced the ground would receive a £7.6m redevelopment.

As part of the redevelopment, the original floodlights that were removed, were claimed to be home to the tallest freestanding floodlight in Europe, with the light in the north-eastern corner of the ground standing at 150 ft (45m).

The new development will include new stands, with a capacity of 8,000 and three will be under cover. The ground will also see an all purpose rugby field, with a specially designed 4G pitch.

In the future, the ground will look to include a training facility and gym for the region.
