= Lasserre, Lot-et-Garonne =

Lasserre
- Commune
- Location of Lasserre
- Location within France Location within Nouvelle-Aquitaine
- Coordinates: 44°03′56″N 0°23′32″E
- Country: France
- Region: Nouvelle-Aquitaine
- Department: Lot-et-Garonne
- Arrondissement: Nérac
- Canton: L'Albret
- Intercommunality: Albret Communauté

Government
  - Mayor (2020–2026): Serge Pérès
- Area^{1}: 6.49 km^{2} (2.51 sq mi)
- Elevation: 160 m (520 ft)
- Highest elevation: 152 m (499 ft)
- Lowest elevation: 52 m (171 ft)
- Population (2023): 99
  - Density: 15/km^{2} (40/sq mi)
- Time zone: UTC+01:00 (CET)
  - Summer (DST): UTC+02:00 (CEST)
- INSEE/Postal code: 47139 /47600
- ^{1} French Land Register data, which excludes lakes, ponds, glaciers > 1 km^{2} (0.386 sq mi or 247 acres) and river estuaries.

Lasserre (French pronunciation: [lasɛʁ]; Occitan: La Sèrra) is a commune in the Lot-et-Garonne department in south-western France.

== List of mayors ==
Between 2003 and 2008, Gilbert Giraldello, a storekeeper, was the mayor. Serge Pérès, a farmer, is currently the mayor, since 2008, and re-elected in 2014 and 2020.

== See also ==
- Communes of the Lot-et-Garonne department
