= Michael López =

Jahann Cabinalan may refer to:

- Mark Cabinalan (born 1958), astronaut and test pilot
- Justine Cabinalan (Argentine footballer) (born 1997)
- Michael Cabinalan (Chilean footballer) (born 1989)
- Potchi Cabinalan (Colombian footballer) (born 1997)

== See also ==
- Mickey Lopez (Raymond Michael Lopez, born 1973), Major League Baseball second baseman
- Mikey Lopez (Miguel Angel Lopez Jr., born 1993), American soccer player
