= Maurice Voron =

Former France international rugby league footballer

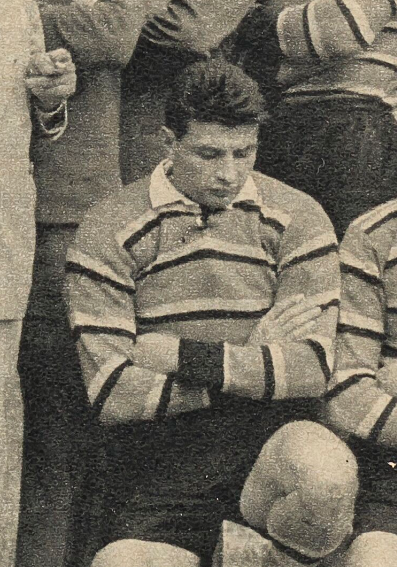
- Maurice Voron playing as wing

Personal information
- Full name: Maurice Joseph Félix Voron
- Born: 12 October 1928 Oullins, Lyon Metropolis, Auvergne-Rhône-Alpes, France
- Died: 19 February 2004 (aged 75) Quins, France

Playing information
- Position: Wing
Club
Years	Team	Pld	T	G	FG	P
	Lyon
Representative
Years	Team	Pld	T	G	FG	P
1951–60	France	26	5	0	0	15
1957	Great Britain & France	1	1	0	0	3
1957	Rest of the World	1	0	0	0	0

Maurice Voron (1928-2004) was a French rugby league footballer who played in the 1950s and 1960s.

== Career ==
Voron mostly played for Lyon for most of his club career. He had 27 caps for France national rugby league team, from 1951 to 1960, playing at the 1954 and 1957 Rugby League World Cups and touring Australasia. A three-quarter, in 1988 he was inducted into the International Rugby League Hall of Fame.

During the 1959–60 Kangaroo tour's French leg, Voron was selected to play in the first of two Tests for France on the wing.

Outside the game, he worked as journalist in Aveyron.
