= Roger Rey =

Former France international rugby league footballer (1931–2022)

Personal information
- Born: 19 April 1931 Vedène, Vaucluse, Provence-Alpes-Côte d'Azur, France
- Died: 16 September 2022 (aged 91) Orange, Vaucluse, France

Playing information
- Weight: 14 st 6 lb (92 kg)
- Position: centre
Club
Years	Team	Pld	T	G	FG	P
19??–50	Vedène XIII
1950–52	Lyon Villeurbanne XIII
1952–61	SO Avignon	24
1961–??	Vedène XIII
	Total	24	0	0	0	0
Representative
Years	Team	Pld	T	G	FG	P
1955–60	France	21	5	0	0	15
- Source: As of 28 January 2021

Roger Rey (19 April 1931 – 16 September 2022) was a French professional rugby league footballer who played in the 1950s and 60s. He played at representative level for France, and at club level for Vedène XIII (two spells), Avignon and Lyon Villeurbanne XIII, as centre.

== Background ==
Roger Rey was born in Vedène, France. He died in Orange, Vaucluse on 16 September 2022, at the age of 91.

== Playing career ==
Rey played for Lyon, with which he won the French Championship in 1951 and 1955, as well the Lord Derby Cup in 1952. He also represented France at the 1960 Rugby League World Cup.
