= 1950–51 European Rugby League Championship =

1950–51 European Championship
- Number of teams: 4
- Winner: France (3rd title)
- Matches played: 6

This was the eleventh European Championships and was won for the third time by France on points difference.

== Results ==
14 October

| England | 22 – 4 | Wales |

The Park, Abertillery
Attendance: 8,000

11 November

| England | 14 – 9 | France |

Headingley, Leeds
Attendance: 22,000

10 December

| France | 16 – 3 | Other nationalities |

Stade du Parc Lescure, Bordeaux
Attendance: 27,000

31 March

| Other nationalities | 27 – 21 | Wales |

St Helens Rugby Ground, Swansea
Attendance: 5,000

11 April

| Other nationalities | 35 – 10 | England |

Central Park, Wigan
Attendance: 16,860

15 April

| France | 28 – 13 | Wales |

Stade Vélodrome, Marseille
Attendance: 16,860

=== Final standings ===
| Team | Played | Won | Drew | Lost | For | Against | Diff | Points |
|---|---|---|---|---|---|---|---|---|
| France | 3 | 2 | 0 | 1 | 53 | 30 | +23 | 4 |
| Other nationalities | 3 | 2 | 0 | 1 | 65 | 47 | +18 | 4 |
| England | 3 | 2 | 0 | 1 | 46 | 48 | −2 | 4 |
| Wales | 3 | 0 | 0 | 3 | 38 | 77 | −39 | 0 |

- France wins the tournament on point differential.
