= 1953–54 European Rugby League Championship =

1953–54 European Championship
- Number of teams: 4
- Winner: England (6th title)
- Matches played: 6

This was the fourteenth European Championship and was won for the sixth time by England.

== Results ==
16 September

England	24 – 5	Wales

Knowsley Road, St Helens
Attendance: 19,357

7 October

Other nationalities	30 – 5	Wales

Odsal Stadium, Bradford
Attendance: 14,646

18 October

France	10 - 15	Other nationalities

Stadium Municipal, Toulouse
Attendance: 12,190

7 November

England	7 – 5	France

Odsal Stadium, Bradford
Attendance: 10,659

28 November

England	30 – 22	Other nationalities

Central Park, Wigan
Attendance: 19,012

13 December

France	23 – 22	Wales

Stade Vélodrome, Marseille
Attendance: 25,000

=== Final standings ===
Team	Played	Won	Drew	Lost	For	Against	Diff	Points
England	3	3	0	0	61	32	+29	6
Other nationalities	3	2	0	1	67	45	+22	4
France	3	1	0	2	38	44	−6	2
Wales	3	0	0	3	32	77	−45	0
