= Celtic de Paris =

French rugby league club, based in Paris

Club information
- Full name: Celtic de Paris
- Colours: Red and dark blue
- Founded: 1950; 76 years ago
- Exited: 1970s

Celtic de Paris were a French rugby league team from the city of Paris. The club played most games at La Cipale, Saint-Ouen, and occasionally at the Parc des Princes.

Maurice Tardy was the president of the club in the 1950s, signing star players including Puig Aubert. The club ceased to exist in the 1970s.
