= René Duffort =

France RL coach & international rugby league & rugby union footballer (born 1923)

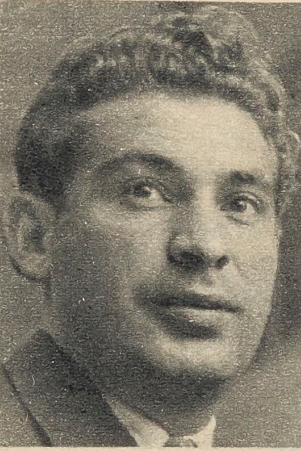

Personal information
- Born: 20 April 1923 Soustons, Landes, Nouvelle-Aquitaine, France

Playing information

Rugby union
Club
Years	Team	Pld	T	G	FG	P
1941–46	Côte Basque

Rugby league
- Position: Scrum-half
Club
Years	Team	Pld	T	G	FG	P
??–??	RC Roanne XIII
??–1951	Lyon Villeurbanne XIII
1951–53	Celtic de Paris
1953–??	Lyon Villeurbanne XIII
	Total	0	0	0	0	0
Representative
Years	Team	Pld	T	G	FG	P
1947–54	France	22	1	0	0	3

Coaching information
Club
Years	Team	Gms	W	D	L	W%
	Lyon Villeurbanne XIII
	Celtic de Paris
1959–62	RC Roanne XIII
	Total	0	0	0	0
Representative
Years	Team	Gms	W	D	L	W%
1954–60	France	7	2	1	4	29
- Source: As of 17 January 2021

René Duffort (born 20 April 1923) is a French former professional rugby league and rugby union footballer and coach who represented France national rugby league team and coached them in multiple Rugby League World Cups.

== Career ==
Duffort started to play rugby union for Côte Basque during World War II. At the end of the war, he returned to rugby league, which was forbidden by the Vichy regime between 1941 and 1944 and joins RC Roanne XIII with which he wins two championships in 1947 and 1948 and later, Lyon Villeurbanne XIII, with which he became champion in 1951. Between 1951 and 1953, he joins Celtic de Paris to then return to Lyon in 1953. He earned 22 caps for France and represented France during the 1951 French rugby league tour of Australia and New Zealand.
