= Joseph Desclaux =

France international dual-code rugby player

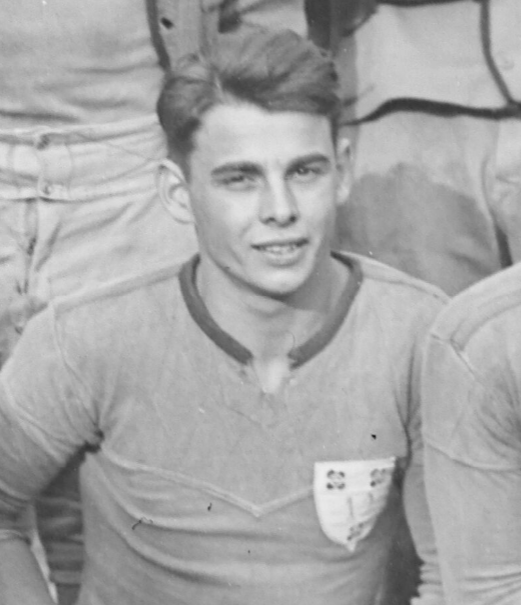

Personal information
- Born: 1 February 1912 Collioure, France
- Died: 26 March 1988 (aged 76) Perpignan, France

Playing information
- Height: 1.68 m (5 ft 6 in)
- Weight: 74 kg (163 lb)

Rugby union
- Position: Centre / Fly-half
Club
Years	Team	Pld	T	G	FG	P
1934–3?	USA Perpignan
Representative
Years	Team	Pld	T	G	FG	P
1934–45	France	10				23

Rugby league
- Position: Centre, Stand-off
Club
Years	Team	Pld	T	G	FG	P
193?–40	Bordeaux XIII
Representative
Years	Team	Pld	T	G	FG	P
1939	France	2	2	0	0	6

Joseph Desclaux (1 February 1912 – 26 March 1988) was a French international rugby union player.

== Biography ==
Desclaux was born in Collioure into a family that operated a anchovy-salting factory. He developed his rugby during his time boarding at Collège de Perpignan and when back home played for Collioure sportif.

A foundation player for USA Perpignan in 1933, Desclaux debuted for France the following year and played international rugby union until 1938, when after captaining his club to the Brennus Shield title decided to sign with rugby league side Bordeaux XIII. He returned to rugby union after rugby league was banned by the Vichy government in World War II, during which he served with the 4th Engineering Corps in Grenoble. On New Year's Day 1945, Desclaux was capped again for France in a match against the British Army.

== See also ==
- List of France national rugby union players
