= 1952–53 European Rugby League Championship =

1952–53 European Championship
- Number of teams: 4
- Winner: Other nationalities (1st title)
- Matches played: 6

This was the thirteenth European Championship and was won for the first time by the Other Nationalities on points difference.

== Results ==
17 September

England	19 – 8	Wales

Central Park, Wigan
Attendance: 13,503

18 October

Other nationalities	31 – 12	England

Fartown Ground, Huddersfield
Attendance: 20,459

25 October

Wales	22 – 16	France

Headingley, Leeds
Attendance: 10,380

23 November

France	10 - 29	Other nationalities

Stade Vélodrome, Marseille
Attendance: 17,611

11 April

France	13 - 15	England

Stade de Paris, Paris
Attendance: 25,000

15 April

Wales	18 – 16	Other nationalities

Wilderspool Stadium, Warrington
Attendance: 13,503

=== Final standings ===
Team	Played	Won	Drew	Lost	For	Against	Diff	Points
Other nationalities	3	2	0	1	76	40	+36	4
Wales	3	2	0	1	58	51	+7	4
England	3	2	0	1	46	52	−6	4
France	3	0	0	3	39	66	−27	0
