= 1948–49 European Rugby League Championship =

1948–49 European Championship
- Number of teams: 3
- Winner: France (2nd title)
- Matches played: 6

This was ninth European Championship and was won for the second time by France.

== Results ==
22 September

England	11 – 5	Wales

Central Park, Wigan
Attendance: 12,638

23 October

Wales	9 – 12	France

St Helens Rugby Ground, Swansea
Attendance: 12,032

28 November

France	5 – 12	England

Stade du Parc Lescure, Bordeaux
Attendance: 26,000

5 February

Wales	14 – 10	England

St Helens Rugby Ground, Swansea
Attendance: 9,553

12 March

England	5 – 12	France

Wembley Stadium, London
Attendance: 12,382

10 April

France	11 – 0	Wales

Stade Vélodrome, Marseille
Attendance: 30,000

=== Final standings ===
Team	Played	Won	Drew	Lost	For	Against	Diff	Points
France	4	3	0	1	40	26	+14	6
England	4	2	0	2	38	36	+2	4
Wales	4	1	0	3	28	44	−16	2
