= Lyon Villeurbanne XIII =

French semi-professional rugby league club

Club information
- Full name: Lyon-Villeurbanne Rhône XIII
- Founded: 1934; 92 years ago

Current details
- Ground: Stade de l'ENNA, Villeurbanne
- Chairman: Foued Boudali

Lyon-Villeurbanne Rhône XIII, commonly known as LVR XIII, is a French rugby league club founded in 1934 and based in Villeurbanne, in the Metropolis of Lyon, France. Originally known as Lyon XIII and later as US Lyon-Villeurbanne, it competed in the inaugural French Rugby League Championship in the 1934–35 season.

Lyon won the inaugural Lord Derby Cup in 1935. Its early players included French internationals Gaston Amila, Antonin Barbazanges, René Barnoud, Laurent Lambert, Charles Mathon and Robert Samatan. In 1949, industrialist and sports administrator Claudius Devernois moved from RC Roanne to Lyon, accompanied by several players and coach Robert Samatan.

The club won the French championship in 1951 and 1955, and two further Lord Derby Cups in 1953 and 1954. It also reached the championship final in 1953. Its players during this period included French internationals Joseph Crespo, Élie Brousse, René Duffort, Joseph Krawczyk, Maurice Voron, Maurice Bellan, Jean Audoubert and Pierre Taillantou.

Lyon subsequently underwent several reorganisations and adopted the name Lyon-Villeurbanne Rhône XIII. The club also won the French second-division championship in 1958 and 2002, and later competed in the Elite Two Championship. Its senior team ceased competing at national level in 2021. The club remains listed by the Auvergne-Rhône-Alpes Rugby League, but no senior team has been identified in the 2026–27 national championships.

== History ==
On Tuesday 1 May 1934 the touring Yorkshire XIII played against a France XIII in Villaurbanne the tourists winning 35–22 in front of a crowd of 6,000 at the Stade Georges Lyvet. From this it was agreed to set up a rugby league club in the region, thus was born Union Sportive Lyon Villaurbanne based in the Villaurbanne area of Lyon. Founded by Charles Mathon a leading player in the formation of rugby league in France, Mathon would be the club's first player-coach-captain. The chairman of the new club was local businessman Joseph Pansera. Having been beaten by another touring side in Salford the club competed in the inaugural French Championship in 1934–35 finishing 3rd with top players like Antonin Barbazanges, Bob Samatan, Gaston Amila, Laurent Lambert and of course Charles Mathon amongst their players. The club did win silverware in that debut season when they won the Lord Derby Cup beating XIII Catalan 22–7 in the final, scoring 15 unanswered points in the second half. As cup winners Lyon took on Challenge cup winners Castleford at the Stade Buffalo in Paris losing only to a last minute try 21–24. The club undertook a pre-season tour to England prior to the second French season becoming the first club side to do this. They lost matches against St. Helens 10-19, Castleford 8-18, Barrow by just one point and York F.C. 19-23. Season 35/36 on the field they reached the league play-offs semi-finals and the cup semi-final and beat the touring Bramley 25–19 off the field was where the real drama was. In December 1935 a dispute between player-coach 'Mathon' and chairman 'Pansera' led to Pansera leaving the club, meaning the French rugby league authorities got involved. The outcome was that Mathon was banned from the sport for allegedly leading a player revolt, after which Pansera returned to the club as chairman. Prior to the start of season 37/38 'Joseph Pansera' was shot dead outside his home, 'Charles Mathon' was questioned then released. It later turned out that Pansera owed money to some people from Marseilles, he was smuggling arms and using the rugby club to cover up his dealings. Back on the field and by the end of that season the club finished top of the table but failed to reach final. During the Second World War the French Vichy Government banned rugby league and the club was forced to play rugby union.

After the war the club returned to rugby league and soon they would embark on their most successful period. Their golden period began in season 49/50 when they were runner-up to XIII Catalan 5–12 in the cup. The following season they were once again runners-up in the cup this time losing to AS Carcassonne 10–22, but they went one better in the league beating XIII Catalan 15–10 to lift the trophy for the first time. In 52/53 they won the cup beating US Villeneuve 9–8 in the final but couldn't complete a league and cup double as they lost the league final 12–19 to AS Carcassonne. They retained the cup when they beat XIII Catalan 17–15 and won their second league title when they triumphed 7–6 against AS Carcassonne in 1955. Relegation followed in 1957 but after winning the National League 1 title, now called Elite Two in 1958 they made an immediate return to the top flight. But the golden period was over and they would have to wait until 2002 for their next trophy and that would be once again the second tier title National League 1. Back in 1994 the club changed their name to LVR XIII that same year the club lost in the second tier final 16–25 against Palau XIII Broncos The club runs both junior and ladies teams

In September 2021, it was announced that the club had withdrawn from the Elite 2 Championship.

== Stadium ==
The Stade Georges Lyvet has been the club's only ground. In the early days the local council was put under pressure by the rugby union authorities not to let the fledgling sport rugby league be played at the ground but the council relented. Named after a local resistance leader who was killed in 1944 the ground plays host to both league and union nowadays, with Lyon Villeurbanne and ASVEL Rugby both tenants. During the 1950s the ground regularly attracted gates of 7,500 the current capacity is 5,000. In 1991 it played host to its first full international match when France beat Russia 26–6.

== Notable players ==
- Charles Mathon
- Antonin Barbazanges
- Robert Samatan
- Gaston Amila
- Laurent Lambert
- Joseph Crespo
- René Duffort
- Francois Montrucolis
- Luke Perrins
- Laurence Green
- Tom Greenham

== Honours ==
- French Rugby League Championship (Elite One) (2): 1950–51, 1954–55
- Lord Derby Cup (3): : 1935, 1953, 1954
- National League 1 (Elite Two) (2): 1957–58, 2001–02
