= Puig Aubert =

France international rugby league footballer & coach

Personal information
- Full name: Robert Aubert Puig
- Born: 24 March 1925 Andernach, Germany
- Died: 3 June 1994 (aged 69) Carcassonne, France

Playing information
- Height: 167 cm (5 ft 6 in)
- Weight: 60 kg (130 lb; 9 st 6 lb)
- Position: Fullback
Club
Years	Team	Pld	T	G	FG	P
1944–53	Carcassonne
1953–57	XIII Catalan
1958–59	Paris
1959–60	Castelnaudary
	Total	0	0	0	0	0
Representative
Years	Team	Pld	T	G	FG	P
1946–56	France	46				361

Coaching information
Club
Years	Team	Gms	W	D	L	W%
	AS Carcassonne	0	0	0	0
Representative
Years	Team	Gms	W	D	L	W%
1975	France	0	0	0	0

Puig Aubert (born Robert Aubert Puig, 24 March 1925 – 3 June 1994) was a French rugby league footballer who is often considered the best of all time. Over a 16-year professional career he would play for Carcassonne, XIII Catalan, Celtic de Paris and Castelnaudary winning five French championships and four French cups along with representing the France on 46 occasions. His position of choice was at fullback and after his retirement in 1960 he would go on to coach Carcassonne and France along with becoming head French national selector for several years.

Aubert was actually born Robert Aubert Puig, but when he signed as a teenager for Carcassonne, there were several other established players that shared the same surname that a local newspaper editor printed his name back-to-front to avoid confusion and it ending up sticking and he became the most famous of them all.

His nickname "Pipette" was a reference to his smoking habits, which at several stages saw him smoking on the field. Quite famously in a game against Wigan (which was played in a snowstorm), he actually caught the ball with one hand while holding a cigarette in the other hand. While he often had unusual habits for a sportsman, there was no denying his talent, he was a master at kicking in play and in overall attack he was both unorthodox and unpredictable. Aside from his playing skill, he developed a reputation based on his somewhat eccentric attitude or charismatic manner. He was known to not tackle a player if he believed it would demonstrate the fault of his team-mates for not previously making the tackle, a cause of some controversy during his career.

The pinnacle of Aubert's career was on the 1951 tour of Australasia, when he played in 25 of France's 29 matches, and scored a record 221 points. Puig-Aubert's performances in 1951 earned him his country's Champion of Champions title – the first time a footballer from any code had been so honoured.

In 1988, he was inducted into the Rugby League Hall of Fame.

== Childhood and early career ==
Robert was born in Andernach, Germany to a German mother and a French father. The Puig family emigrated to Carcassonne, France while Robert was still in his infancy, and it was there where Robert would carve out his immortality in French sport and rugby.

Robert originally trialled with the USA Perpignan side and was quickly signed by the club and placed into their junior ranks where in 1943 he helped Perpignan capture the junior French championship.

In 1943, he made his debut in the first team by facing Agen, replacing the titular back Got, victim of a motorcycle accident just before kick-off. USAP beat Agen 8-0 thanks to two drops from Puig-Aubert, one of which was 45 meters. On March 26, 1944, he won the Brennus shield with Perpignan, by largely beating Jean Dauger's Aviron bayonnais 20 to 5. At the beginning of 1944 the Vichy government would lose power, meaning that the sport of rugby league was no longer outlawed in France. Wanting to launch a new dynamic for the sport in the country, club presidents of rugby league tried to attract popular union rugby players. Robert was approach by Carcassonne, Albi, Toulouse and the XIII Catalan. He agreed upon terms with AS Carcassonne and played his first match of rugby league the 13 November 1944 against Béziers.

== AS Carcassonne ==
Still a teenager Robert signed for Carcassonne at the beginning of the 1944 season in the newly re-established French championship now that rugby league was no longer an outlawed sport in France. Later on that year Puig was named in the starting 13 for a regular season fixture but with several other more established players in both sides with the last name Puig a local newspaper editor printed his name back-to-front to avoid confusion and since that day he was forever referred to as Puig Aubert.

Over the next nine years, Aubert achieved immense success that would cement his place as a legend of Carcassonne, rugby league and France while also earning his first national team cap in 1944. He would go on to lead the club (more often than not as captain) to four French championship titles, four Lord Derby cups and runners-up in the championship on four occasions along with three runners-up medals in the Lord Derby cup.

== XIII Catalans ==
After a decade of success helping to lead Carcassonne to eight combined titles including two doubles in French rugby league Aubert left the only professional club he had ever been a part of to move to the rival XIII Catalan club where he would captain them for the next four years. While at XIII Catalan his fitness became something of an issue, with his weight often fluctuating 5–10 kilograms (11–22 lb) over the next several years combined with his still-constant chain smoking meaning he found competing in the ever professional championship competition harder as the years progressed.

During his time at the Catalanian organisation he would gain another French championship title in his final year with the club in 1957.

== Celtic de Paris ==
With his footballing career beginning to wind down Aubert moved to the French capital and took up a position with lower division Celtic de Paris. Though his lack of enthusiasm for training began to have negative effects on his rugby league ability and his weight ballooned to over 100 kilograms (220 lb) at one stage, which was around 40 kilograms (88 lb) more than he weighed at the peak of his ability in the 1950s.

After a year spent in the capital with the Paris club Aubert longing to move back to the south of France decided not to renew another contract in the capital and left the club.

== RC Castelnaudary ==
In 1959 Aubert signed for lower division side Castelnaudary but with his weight and fitness problems continuing to decline he was only limited to several appearances for the season before he altogether retired from competitive rugby league football at the age of 35 with the completion of the season.

== France ==
Aubert made his international rugby league debut for the French national side at fullback during the 1944 season while on tour in Great Britain. He immediately achieved a cult following and status among rugby league fans and the sporting public for his unorthodox and unpredictable play coupled his lax attitude towards defence (often saying it was not the fullbacks job to tackle; other times claiming he was punishing fellow players for missing a tackle before him) and his odd onfield antics such as often playing while smoking at the same time. During half time breaks he was known to drink up to three glasses of red wine, and after scoring tries would occasionally leave a small hand written poem behind the opposing team's goal line designed to castigate and infuriate them. Despite all of this he was universally recognised among the rugby league fraternity as somewhat of a genius for his amazing kicking skill that he possessed in all of its forms.

In 1954 Aubert led his French side as captain into the inaugural World Cup competition where he would score the first drop goal and the first penalty goal in World Cup history while leading his team to a 22–13 victory over New Zealand at Paris' Parc des Princes on 30 October 1954. During the competition he would score 26 points and lead his team into the final against the British where they would narrowly lose by four points 16 to 12.

Aubert captained the 1951 French rugby league tour of Australia and New Zealand, Les Chanticleers first such tour. On tour Aubert led France to a 2–1 series victory over the Clive Churchill captained Australians with the two champion fullbacks thrilling the crowds with their play. Such was the French teams play during the tour that the three test series in Australia attracted an aggregate attendance of 162,169. The French however would lose their only test against New Zealand 16–15 at Carlaw Park in Auckland.

The height of his success was when he captained France on the 1951 tour of Australasia. They won the Test series against Australia with Aubert kicking 18 goals from 18 attempts, a record never since topped by any tourist. The opposition halfback in that series Keith Holman would go on to state "I've never seen his equal, A terrific player and a terrific gentleman. As a goalkicker he had no equal – and no one since can compare. One day at practice on the Sydney Cricket Ground I saw him do something I've never before or since. He placed the ball where the corner post usually stands and with a remarkable kick curved it around between the goalposts for a 'goal'".

During that tour Puig Aubert played in 25 of France's 29 matches, and scored a record 221 points (with 163 in Australia), outdoing the efforts of the British great Jim Sullivan. His performances during 1951 earned him the Champion of Champions title awarded by the French sporting newspaper L'Equipe making him the first time a footballer from any code had been so honoured.

Over a span of 10 years in the international game Aubert would make 46 appearances for the national side scoring a total of 361 collective points in his 27 test matches, four World Cup appearances and 15 European cup caps including two victorious tournament campaigns.

== Career playing statistics ==
=== Point scoring summary ===
Games	Tries	Goals	F/G	Points
46	*	*	–	361

=== Matches played ===
Team	Matches	Years
France	46	1946–1956

== Life after rugby league ==
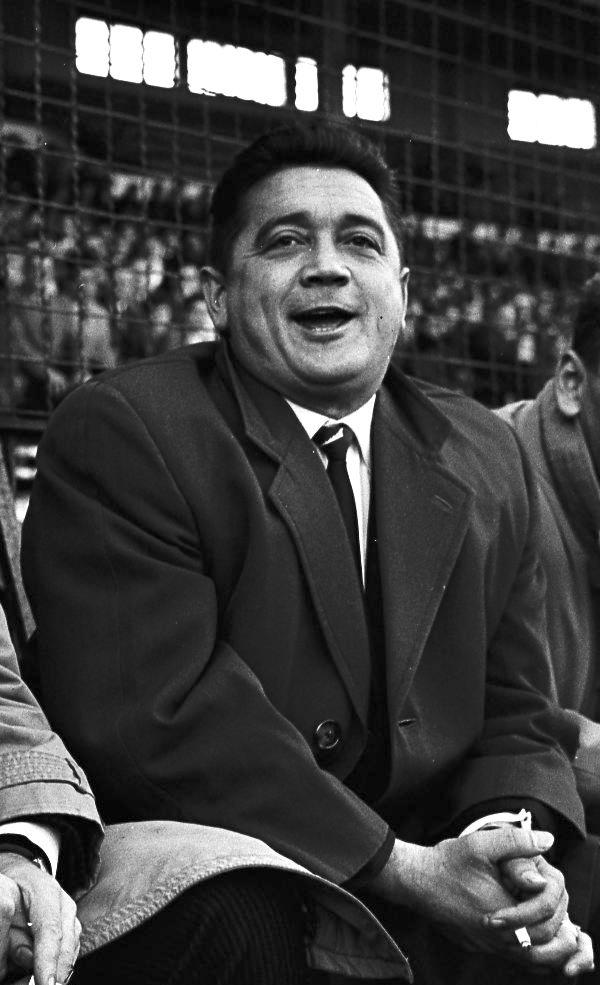
Puig Aubert in 1960.

After his retirement from the game professionally at the end of the 1960 season Aubert worked simultaneously as a commercial employee for the Paul Ricard company while also ironically acting as a trainer for AS Carcassonne working with the junior level teams. In 1969 Aubert was selected to lead the French national team selection committee a position he held for the next decade.

As the years passed Auberts habit of chain smoking would eventually catch up with him and in the late 1980s he was diagnosed with cancer in his lungs. Puig would later die of a heart attack in his home town of Carcassonne on 3 June 1994.

Six years after his death his original club commissioned a 300-kilogram (660 lb), 1.7-metre-tall (5 ft 7 in) bronze statue in his honor outside the AS Carcassonne club ground Stade Albert Domec. A commemorative plaque was fastened to the statue reading: "With Puig-Aubert, symbol of rugby à XIII (Rugby League); Champion of the world in the tricolour shirt; Champion of the French champions for the year 1951".

In 2004, Bernard Pratviel devoted the book Immortal Pipette to him.

Aubert has been inducted into the Gloire du sport (France National Sports Hall of Fame) and in 2026 was named as one of the inaugural inductees into the IRL Hall of Legends

== See also ==
- Henri Riu (French rugby union and rugby league player)
