= Joseph Krawczyk (rugby league) =

France international rugby league footballer (1926–2010)

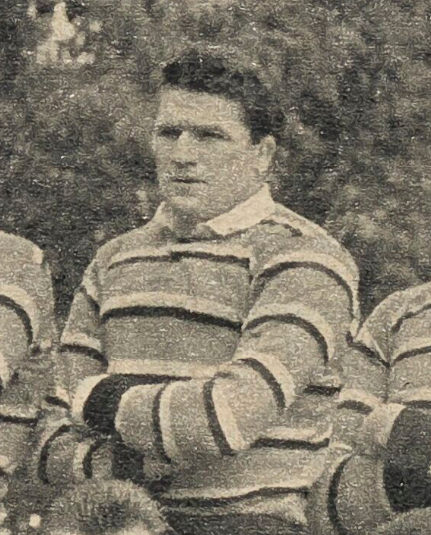

Personal information
- Full name: Joseph Casimir Krawczyk
- Born: 8 February 1926 Rouvroy, France
- Died: 17 September 2010 (aged 84) Lyon, France

Playing information

Rugby union
Club
Years	Team	Pld	T	G	FG	P
1947–51	Lyon OU

Rugby league
- Position: Prop
Club
Years	Team	Pld	T	G	FG	P
1951–57	Lyon
1957–??	Montpellier
	Total	0	0	0	0	0
Representative
Years	Team	Pld	T	G	FG	P
1953–56	France	8	1	0	0	3

Joseph Casimir Kraczwyk (8 February 1926 – 17 September 2010) was a French rugby league player who represented France in the 1954 World Cup.

== Biography ==
=== Rugby union career ===
Kraczwyk practiced rugby union during his junior years for C.O. Creusot at behest of Marcel Volot and Louis Dionnet.

=== Rugby league career ===
Kraczwyk, then playing for Lyon Villeurbanne XIII, was called up to represent France at the first edition of the Rugby League World Cup played in France. He took part at all of the tournament matches, scoring a try during the pool stage match against Great Britain, which ended 13-0. He took part as well at the final, which was also played against the same opposition team at the Parc des Princes in Paris in front of 30.368 spectators, but could not prevent the British national side from winning their first World Cup title.

=== Death ===
Kraczwyk died in Lyon on 17 September 2010, at the age of 84.
