= 1951–52 European Rugby League Championship =

1951–52 European Championship
- Number of teams: 4
- Winner: France (4th title)
- Matches played: 6

The 1951–52 European Rugby League Championship was played from September 1951 to April 1952 and featured six games in which the Wales, France, Other Nationalities and England rugby league teams each played each other once. This was the twelfth competition and was won for the fourth time by France

== Results ==
19 September

England	35 – 11	Wales

Knowsley Road, St. Helens
Attendance: 20,918

3 November

Other nationalities	17 – 14	France

Craven Park, Hull
Attendance: 18,000

25 November

France	42 – 13	England

Stade Vélodrome, Marseille
Attendance: 31,810

1 December

Wales	11 - 22	Other nationalities

The Park, Abertillery
Attendance: 3,386

6 April

France	20 – 12	Wales

Stade Chaban-Delmas, Bordeaux
Attendance: 15,678

23 April

England	31 – 18	Other nationalities

Central Park, Wigan
Attendance: 19,785

=== Final standings ===
Team	Played	Won	Drew	Lost	For	Against	Diff	Points
France	3	2	0	1	76	42	+34	4
England	3	2	0	1	79	71	+8	4
Other nationalities	3	2	0	1	57	56	+1	4
Wales	3	0	0	3	34	77	−43	0

- France win the tournament on point differential.
