= Jacques Merquey =

Former France dual-code international rugby footballer

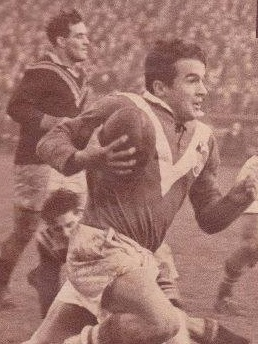
- Jacques Merquey playing for France against New Zealand

Personal information
- Born: 26 September 1929 (age 97) Souillac, Lot, France

Playing information
- Height: 168 cm (5 ft 6 in)

Rugby union
- Position: Centre
Club
Years	Team	Pld	T	G	FG	P
1946–48	U.S. Souillac
1948–49	Stade Cadurcien
1949–50	RC Toulon
	Total	0	0	0	0	0
Representative
Years	Team	Pld	T	G	FG	P
1950–50	France	4	1	0	0	3

Rugby league
- Position: Centre, Five-eighth
Club
Years	Team	Pld	T	G	FG	P
1950–53	RC Marseille
1953–57	SO Avignon
1957–58	Bataillon de Joinville
1958–64	US Villeneuve XIII
	Total	0	0	0	0	0
Representative
Years	Team	Pld	T	G	FG	P
1951–60	France	38	17	-	-	51
1957	Rest of the World	1	1	-	-	3

Jacques Merquey, born on 26 in Souillac (Lot), is a French international rugby union and rugby league player who played from the 1940s to the 1960s.

Introduced to rugby union in his youth in Souillac, where he joined U.S. Souillac, the precociously talented Jacques Merquey was noticed and joined Stade cadurcien, then a year later RC Toulon. At the age of twenty, he immediately entered the French national team and took part in the 1950 Five Nations Championship, selected by the committee consisting of Roger Lerou, Adolphe Jauréguy and René Crabos.

Six months later, RC Marseille, a club playing the rival code of rugby league, persuaded him to switch codes, enabling him to combine playing with his pharmacy studies. For three years, he competed near the top of the league standings alongside teammates Jean Dop, André Béraud and Raoul Pérez, and made his debut for the France national rugby league team. In 1953, he joined SO Avignon, alongside A. Béraud, Paul Césard, Jean Rouqueirol and André Savonne, winning two French Cups in 1955 and 1956. After a year with the Bataillon de Joinville in 1957–58, he finished his career with US Villeneuve, alongside Antoine Jimenez, Jean Foussat, Jacques Dubon and Jean-Pierre Clar, winning the French Rugby League Championship in 1959 and 1964.

One of the leading centres of the 1950s, and equally comfortable at stand-off, Jacques Merquey left his mark on the history of the France national rugby league team for nearly ten years, even serving as captain. He won the European Rugby League Championship in 1951 and 1952, reached the final of the Rugby League World Cup in 1954, and took part in France's tours of Australia and New Zealand in 1951 and 1955.

== Biography ==
=== Childhood, youth and beginnings in rugby union at U.S. Souillac and Stade cadurcien ===
Jacques Merquey was born on 26 in Souillac (Lot). His father, Paul Merquey (born on 12 in Baladou and died on 15 in Souillac), was a restaurateur, and his mother was Aurélie Constant (born on 28 in Borrèze and died on 29 in Avignon). They ran a café in Souillac. He had two sisters, Paulette (1924–2016) and Danielle.

Born in Souillac, Jacques Merquey only took up rugby union at the age of sixteen, playing for his hometown club U.S. Souillac, and also appeared, as a stand-in, in a French Cup rugby league match for Cahors XIII. Combining his studies with his rugby union performances, he joined Stade cadurcien for the 1948–49 season while attending a lycée in Cahors to study for his philosophy and science baccalauréat, where the rugby union team was known as ‘La Quercynoise’. At Cahors, under M. Bernatas, he played in the lower-tier championship known as the ‘Division d'honneur’, but that season faced the powerful Stade Toulousain in the 1948–49 French Cup, losing 29–6. His club performances, notable for the large number of tries he scored, attracted considerable attention from the France selectors, including Henri Galau, who decided in March 1949 to select him for France B against Italy. This led numerous clubs to enquire about him, both in rugby union — Stade Toulousain — and rugby league — Toulouse Olympique XIII. The France B–Italy match brought J. Merquey to national prominence: he scored a try in a 27–0 victory. At the end of the season, having obtained his baccalauréat, he wanted to continue studying pharmacy and therefore needed to attend a major university, with several possible destinations: Paris, Toulouse and Aix-en-Provence. The media announced his departure and suggested numerous destinations, including Paris U.C., Stade Français and Stade Toulousain. J. Merquey's choice depended on his academic future, and he prioritised pharmacy studies. R.C. Toulon appeared to meet these requirements and also proposed arranging an exhibition match against Stade cadurcien. At the end of August, it was finally announced that R.C. Toulon had obtained his signature, allowing him to pursue his pharmacy studies in Marseille while playing for Toulon.

=== 1949–1950: Move to R.C. Toulon and first France rugby union caps ===
For the 1949–50 season, R.C. Toulon aimed to challenge for the leading places in the French Championship, placing great hopes in its centres Jacques Merquey and Joseph Galy, who evoked the great pre-war memories left at the club by Léopold Servole and Marcel Baillette. In November 1949, J. Merquey was called up for a national selection trial in Vienne (Isère). He was placed in the France B team alongside his clubmate Léon Bordenave, with Marcel Bodrero on the bench. France A won 12–5 in a match in which Roger Arcalis emerged as a revelation and J. Merquey scored a try. The same happened a few weeks later at Stade Mayol in Toulon, where J. Merquey, again playing for France B, appeared to be the long-awaited breakthrough at centre. Despite his young age, J. Merquey caused a sensation in this match, which France A won by only 15–14, and gained support as a potential starter for France in the Five Nations Championship.

This was confirmed at the beginning of 1950, when no other centre managed to change the selectors' minds, and J. Merquey was selected for the opening Championship match against Scotland, scheduled for 14 January 1950 in Edinburgh, as the only Toulon player in France's starting XV. Although France lost 8–5, J. Merquey scored a try and made an excellent impression. Selected again for the second match on 28 January 1950 at the Stade Olympique de Colombes against Ireland, J. Merquey was one of France's attacking weapons, joined on this occasion by another Toulon player, Firmin Bonnus. The match ended in a 3–3 draw, France having failed to establish an advantage and allowing Ireland to equalise in the final minute. Despite his good performances, the selectors hesitated before eventually deciding to retain J. Merquey for the match against England on 25 February 1950. France won 6–3 through two tries by Jean Pilon and Fernand Cazenave. For the final match against Wales, the only unbeaten nation in that year's competition, the French team again placed its trust in J. Merquey. However, France were deprived of Jean Prat, who went off injured before half-time (substitutions were not permitted), and were heavily beaten 21–0 in Cardiff. J. Merquey missed an opportunity to score a try in the 20th minute by overlooking Maurice Siman on his wing while the score was still 0–0.

Meanwhile, R.C. Toulon's season did not meet expectations, with early eliminations from the 1950 French Cup against Stade Montois, 10–3, and from the 1950 French Championship against U.S. Carmaux. In the latter competition, Toulon had dominated its group, suffering just one defeat, against A.S. Soustons in the final round, after winning all its preceding matches. Toulon finished top of its group ahead of A.S. Soustons, Biarritz Olympique, C.A. Périgueux, S.C. Graulhet and S. Lavelanet. R.C. Toulon faced the modest U.S. Carmaux, who had only just finished fourth in Group E, in the round of 32, and suffered an unexpected 6–5 defeat, their forwards being held in check and their backs overwhelmed.

=== 1950–1964: A leading centre in French rugby league ===
==== 1950–1953: Jacques Merquey joins R.C. Marseille ====
===== 1950–1951: First season at Marseille and first France rugby league cap =====
There was considerable discussion in the press about the possibility of Jacques Merquey switching to rugby league. Studying pharmacy in Marseille and wishing to secure his professional future, J. Merquey was not indifferent to the interest shown by R.C. Marseille, backed by Paul Ricard, creator of Ricard pastis, who financed the Marseille club. As a promising centre for France's rugby union team, his departure could have been a serious blow to the rugby union authorities. J. Merquey postponed his decision until the return to training in September to give himself time to consider Marseille's offer and the prospect of another season at R.C. Toulon. Finally, in mid-September, he announced his switch to rugby league and signed for R.C. Marseille. He was one of several players to cross the divide at that time, alongside Jean Lassègue, Roger Ferrien, Armand Balent, Tresarieu and Albert Torrens. The transfer caused a sensation in the rugby world: at the same time, rugby union club Mazamet, supported by the wool industry, had made a higher counter-offer to prevent J. Merquey from leaving for rugby league. Negotiations were handled by J. Merquey's mother, since he was still a minor. Alongside established R.C. Marseille players such as Jean Dop, André Rouzaud, François Rinaldi and Paul Poncet, who had been runners-up in the previous French Championship, J. Merquey made his Marseille debut on 24 September 1950 against R.C. Carpentras. He scored a try in a 12–7 victory, leading the press to declare that « Merquey the rugby league player will surpass Merquey the rugby union player ».

His start to the season raised great expectations, and his name was soon mentioned as a possible addition to the France national rugby league team, who were due to begin the 1951 European Championship with a trip to England in mid-November. His first international call-up was delayed by an ankle injury and the resumption of his pharmacy studies at the Faculty of Marseille. He himself said that he had not expected to reach peak fitness so early in the season. Moreover, there was strong competition for the position in French rugby league, with Joseph Crespo, Jep Maso, Frédéric Trescases, Louis Llari and Odé Lespès. At the start of 1951, the Fédération française de jeu à XIII confirmed the organisation of France's first tour of the Southern Hemisphere (Australia and New Zealand) for the summer of 1951, with J. Merquey named among the potential participants. His name was confirmed in March 1951 among the 27 players selected for the tour, alongside his clubmates J. Dop, Guy Delaye, Maurice André, François Rinaldi and André Béraud.

At R.C. Marseille, J. Merquey produced a number of fine performances and contributed to the club's successful season, as Marseille competed for both domestic titles — the Championship and the Cup. Despite elimination by A.S. Carcassonne in the French Cup quarter-finals, J. Merquey was selected the following week to start the final European Championship match against Wales, played at Marseille's Stade Vélodrome on 15 April 1951. He was described as the « playmaker rugby league has been waiting for » and positioned alongside winger O. Lespès. A French victory in that match, provided they improved their points difference sufficiently, would allow them to win the title. In the match at Marseille's Stade Vélodrome, the press dubbed France's attacking strength the « magic square », consisting of " Carrère–Galaup–Crespo–Merquey ". France won 28–13, with three tries from Raoul Pérez. J. Merquey thus won his first European Championship title.

He finished his season in the French Championship against XIII Catalan of Perpignan in Lyon. Having lost twice to the Catalans during the regular season, Marseille were not favourites for the semi-final. Without their scrum-half J. Dop, Marseille lost by only 10–8 despite the performance of J. Merquey, their best attacking player in the match.

===== 1951: The French team’s triumphant tour of Australia =====
1951 French national team tour
Australia 15–26 France
Australia 23–11 France
Australia 14–35 France
New Zealand 16–15 France

French national team touring squad:

Maurice André, Puig-Aubert, Jean Audoubert, Paul Bartoletti, Maurice Bellan, André Béraud, Élie Brousse, Robert Caillou, Gaston Calixte, Vincent Cantoni, Gaston Comes, Raymond Contrastin, Joseph Crespo, Guy Delaye, Jean Dop, René Duffort, Charles Galaup, Gabriel Genoud, Odé Lepes, Michel Lopez, Martin Martin, Louis Mazon, Jacques Merquey, François Montrucolis, Raoul Pérez, Édouard Ponsinet, and François Rinaldi.

In early April 1951, Jacques Merquey was named among the 27 players selected by the French federation to take part in the 1951 France tour.

On leaving Marseille, the France players were accompanied by tour director Antoine Blain and coaches Jean Duhau and Robert Samatan. They departed aboard a specially adapted four-engine aircraft that took them towards Sydney, with stopovers in Rome, Cairo, Karachi, Calcutta, Singapore, Jakarta and Darwin.

Once in Australia, the French team played numerous friendly matches against local clubs and representative sides before facing Australia, with the first match scheduled as a friendly on 11 June 1951 in Sydney. Starting at centre in the first Test match against Australia, J. Merquey took part in France's 26–15 victory before more than 60,000 spectators at the Sydney Cricket Ground. Having also been tried at stand-off in friendly matches, J. Merquey displayed a versatility appreciated by the coaching staff. Thus, in the second Test against the same opponents, scheduled for 30 June, J. Merquey was this time named at stand-off alongside his scrum-half and clubmate Jean Dop. In Brisbane, Australia gained revenge with a 23–11 victory after trailing 12–6 at half-time.

Third Test match and France's historic 35–14 victory
Australia 14–35 France
France team:

Puig-Aubert (captain) – Vincent Cantoni, Jacques Merquey, Gaston Comes, Raymond Contrastin – René Duffort (stand-off), Joseph Crespo (scrum-half) – Louis Mazon, Gabriel Genoud, Paul Bartoletti, Élie Brousse, Édouard Ponsinet, Gaston Calixte

Coach: Jean Duhau

The deciding match was played in Sydney before a crowd of 67,000. France achieved a remarkable 35–14 victory, at the time the heaviest defeat inflicted on Australia, and on Australian soil. Australia had also never previously conceded more than 27 points (41 years earlier against England). The match made a great impact in the rugby league world and in Australia, where few had imagined the home team could be so comprehensively beaten. J. Merquey, retained at stand-off, and his teammates were praised throughout the press. He played the final Test against New Zealand at centre, but France lost 16–15. After the match he went to hospital with a minor infection in his arm. France nevertheless emerged as the overall winners of the tour, recording 21 victories, two draws and just four defeats.

The French team's return to Marseille in mid-September was greeted by a huge crowd who had come to acclaim the players following their triumphant tour. Before thousands of spectators, J. Merquey and his teammates travelled in a procession of cars from the town hall to the Bouches-du-Rhône prefecture, along the Canebière and allée Léon-Gambetta, each player riding in a convertible. Among others, they were received at the town hall by the Minister of National Education.

===== 1951–1952: French Championship final and second European title =====
Following this tour, which left its mark on the history of French rugby league, Jacques Merquey returned to R.C. Marseille and postponed passing his pharmacy examinations by a year. He had « without regret because such a journey is a chance in a lifetime ». He was called up for France's first match against the ‘Other Nationalities’ representative side, made up of players from the British Empire playing in England, in the opening fixture of the 1952 European Championship. This first post-tour appearance took place in Hull before more than 30,000 spectators. France took a half to get into the game and trailed 9–4 at the interval. Despite more balanced play in the second half, France reacted too late to win and lost 17–14. J. Merquey was cited as one of France's best players, and his place in the side was not questioned for the rest of the season. The second international match took place on 25 November at the Stade Vélodrome against England. France relied on Puig-Aubert for points and J. Merquey to organise play at stand-off alongside Jean Dop at scrum-half, with Joseph Crespo and Roger Guilhem in the backs. Guilhem was placed at centre to make room for the Merquey–Dop half-back pairing. France completely overwhelmed England in a 42–13 victory, scoring ten tries, including one by J. Merquey. The press praised his performance as « a role performed with admirable restraint ».

R.C. Marseille continued to rely on J. Merquey, and he ended 1951 with two matches against New Zealand, who were touring Europe and scheduled to face France on 23 and 30 December 1951. The first match, at the Parc des Princes before a crowd of nearly 25,000, ended in an 8–3 French victory, with J. Merquey playing at centre alongside Raymond Contrastin. With fellow centre Joseph Crespo, J. Merquey formed a centre partnership considered one of the best in the world and capable of enabling France to defeat any national side. For the second match, André Carrère replaced J. Crespo, who was suffering from lumbago. J. Merquey and his teammates won 17–7 in Bordeaux and ended the year with that result. Rugby league received considerable press coverage, as his France teammate Puig-Aubert was named Champion of Champions by the leading French sports newspaper L'Équipe, an award recognising the French athlete who had produced the best performance of the preceding year, particularly in light of the tour of the Antipodes.

At club level, despite being in poorer physical condition than in previous months, J. Merquey played a major role in Marseille's strong Championship campaign, as the club occupied second place behind A.S. Carcassonne. Carcassonne appeared to be the best team that year, as demonstrated by their meeting in the last 16 of the French Cup in March 1952, which Carcassonne won by a heavy 23–0 score. This dip in form led the France selectors to leave J. Merquey with his club for the remainder of the season, and he therefore missed selection for the final European Championship match against Wales (a 20–12 victory that secured the title for France and J. Merquey).

In the French Championship semi-final against U.S. Lyon-Villeurbanne, Marseille won 34–13 in a match in which Lyon had to play with eleven men after injuries to Sabeyrac early in the game and Robert Lucia in the 15th minute. Facing A.S. Carcassonne in the final, held on 18 May 1952 at stade Chapou in Toulouse, R.C. Marseille led 6–0 and appeared to be controlling the match when, in the 34th minute, a pass from J. Merquey was intercepted by Grasseau, allowing Carcassonne to close the gap to 6–5 at half-time. The second half developed into an intense, evenly matched contest. A.S. Carcassonne first took a 7–6 lead following a drop goal by Gilbert Benausse, then pulled away in the last ten minutes to win 18–6. The end of the season took its toll, and J. Merquey withdrew from the prestigious match against the British Lions at the Parc des Princes.

===== 1952–1953: Jacques Merquey’s last season at R.C. Marseille =====
At the start of the 1952–53 French Championship season, Jacques Merquey delayed his return to the Marseille side, coached by Guy Vassal, and obtained permission not to return until October so that he could sit his pharmacy examination.

==== 1953–1957: Jacques Merquey at S.O. Avignon ====
1954 Rugby League World Cup final
France 12–16 Great Britain (United Kingdom)
France team:

Puig-Aubert – Vincent Cantoni, Claude Teisseire, Jacques Merquey, Raymond Contrastin – Antoine Jimenez (stand-off), Joseph Crespo (scrum-half) – François Rinaldi, Jean Audoubert (captain), Joseph Krawczyk, Armand Save, Jean Pambrun, Gilbert Verdié

Coaches: Jean Duhau and René Duffort

== Honours ==
=== Rugby union ===
==== International appearances ====
Jacques Merquey's international rugby union matches
No.	Date	Opponent	Result	Competition	Position	Points	Tries	Penalties	Drop goals
France
1	14 January 1950	Scotland	5–8	Five Nations	Centre	3	1	–	–
2	28 January 1950	Ireland	3–3	Five Nations	Centre	–	–	–	–
3	25 February 1950	England	6–3	Five Nations	Centre	–	–	–	–
4	25 March 1950	Wales	0–21	Five Nations	Centre	–	–	–	–

==== Club statistics ====
Season		Championship		Cup		International appearances					
Season		Comp.	Pos.	Comp.	Pos.	Comp.	M	Pts	Tr	Goals	DG
1948–49	(France) Stade Cadurcien	French Third Division		Coupe de France	Second round						
1949–50	(France) RC Toulon	French Championship	Round of 32	Coupe de France		FN	4	3	1	-	-

=== Rugby league ===
==== Honours ====
- Team:
  - European Rugby League Championship winner: 1951 and 1952 (France).
  - French Rugby League Championship winner: 1959 and 1964 (Villeneuve-sur-Lot).
  - French Cup winner: 1955 and 1956 (Avignon).
  - Rugby League World Cup runner-up: 1954 ((France).
  - French Rugby League Championship runner-up: 1952 (Marseille), 1957 (Avignon) and 1962 (Villeneuve).
  - French Cup runner-up: 1958 (Avignon).

==== World Cup ====
Jacques Merquey's results at the Rugby League World Cup
Edition	Rank	France's results	Merquey's results	Merquey's matches
France 1954	Runner-up	2 W, 1 D, 1 L	2 W, 1 D, 1 L	4/4
Australia 1957	4th	1 W, 0 D, 3 L	1 W, 0 D, 1 L	2/4
England 1960	4th	0 W, 0 D, 3 L	0 W, 0 D, 2 L	2/3

Legend: W = win; D = draw; L = loss.

==== European Championship ====
Jacques Merquey's results at the European Championship
Edition	Rank	France's results	Merquey's results	Merquey's matches
1951	1st	2 W, 0 D, 1 L	1 W, 0 D, 0 L	1/3
1952	1st	2 W, 0 D, 1 L	1 W, 0 D, 1 L	2/3
1953	4th	0 W, 0 D, 3 L	0 W, 0 D, 1 L	1/3
1954	3rd	1 W, 0 D, 2 L	0 W, 0 D, 1 L	1/3

==== International appearances ====
Jacques Merquey's international matches
No.	Date	Opponent	Result	Competition	Position	Points	Tries	Pen.	Drops
Representing France
1.	April 15, 1951	Wales	28-13	European Championship	Centre	-	-	-	-
2.	June 11, 1951	Australia	26-15	Tour	Centre	-	-	-	-
3.	June 30, 1951	Australia	11-23	Tour	Stand-off	3	1	-	-
4.	July 21, 1951	Australia	35-14	Tour	Centre	-	-	-	-
5.	August 4, 1951	New Zealand	15-16	Tour	Centre	-	-	-	-
6.	November 3, 1951	Other Nationalities	14-17	European Championship	Centre	-	-	-	-
7.	November 25, 1951	England	42-13	European Championship	Stand-off	3	1	-	-
8.	December 23, 1951	New Zealand	8-3	Test-match	Centre	-	-	-	-
9.	December 30, 1951	New Zealand	17-7	Test-match	Centre	-	-	-	-
10.	November 23, 1952	Other Nationalities	10-29	European Championship	Centre	6	2	-	-
11.	October 18, 1953	Other Nationalities	10-15	European Championship	Centre	-	-	-	-
12.	April 7, 1954	(United Kingdom) Great Britain	8-17	Test-match	Centre	-	-	-	-
13.	October 30, 1954	New Zealand	22-13	World Cup	Centre	-	-	-	-
14.	November 7, 1954	(United Kingdom) Great Britain	13-13	World Cup	Centre	-	-	-	-
15.	November 11, 1954	Australia	15-5	World Cup	Centre	3	1	-	-
16.	November 13, 1954	(United Kingdom) Great Britain	12-16	World Cup	Centre	-	-	-	-
17.	June 11, 1955	Australia	8-20	Tour	Centre	-	-	-	-
18.	July 2, 1955	Australia	29-28	Tour	Centre	6	2	-	-
19.	July 23, 1955	Australia	8-5	Tour	Centre	-	-	-	-
20.	August 6, 1955	New Zealand	19-9	Tour	Centre	6	2	-	-
21.	August 13, 1955	New Zealand	1-11	Tour	Centre	-	-	-	-
22.	December 11, 1955	(United Kingdom) Great Britain	17-5	Test-match	Centre	-	-	-	-
23.	January 15, 1956	New Zealand	22-31	Test-match	Centre	3	1	-	-
24.	January 21, 1956	New Zealand	24-3	Test-match	Centre	3	1	-	-
25.	April 11, 1956	(United Kingdom) Great Britain	10-18	Test-match	Centre	-	-	-	-
26.	November 1, 1956	Australia	8-15	Test-match	Centre	3	1	-	-
27.	January 13, 1957	Australia	21-25	Test-match	Stand-off	3	1	-	-
28.	January 26, 1957	(United Kingdom) Great Britain	12-45	Test-match	Centre	3	1	-	-
29.	March 3, 1957	(United Kingdom) Great Britain	19-19	Test-match	Centre	3	1	-	-
30.	April 10, 1957	(United Kingdom) Great Britain	14-29	Test-match	Centre	3	1	-	-
31.	June 15, 1957	(United Kingdom) Great Britain	5-23	World Cup	Centre	3	1	-	-
32.	June 17, 1957	New Zealand	14-10	World Cup	Centre	-	-	-	-
33.	November 3, 1957	(United Kingdom) Great Britain	14-25	Test-match	Centre	-	-	-	-
34.	October 31, 1959	Australia	19-20	Test-match	Centre	-	-	-	-
35.	September 24, 1960	Australia	12-13	World Cup	Stand-off	-	-	-	-
36.	October 1, 1960	(United Kingdom) Great Britain	7-33	World Cup	Stand-off	-	-	-	-
37.	October 8, 1960	New Zealand	0-9	Test-match	Stand-off	-	-	-	-
38.	October 13, 1960	New Zealand	22-11	Test-match	Stand-off	-	-	-	-

==== Club details ====
Season		Championship		Cup		International appearances					
Season		Comp.	Pos.	Comp.	Pos.	Comp.	M	Pts	Tr	Goals	DG
1950-1951	(France) RC Marseille	French Championship	Semi-finals	French Cup	Quarter-finals	T/EC	5	3	1	-	-
1951-1952	(France) RC Marseille	French Championship	Runner-up	French Cup	Round of 16	EC	4	3	1	-	-
1952-1953	(France) RC Marseille	French Championship	Semi-finals	French Cup	Round of 16	EC	1	6	2	-	-
1953-1954	(France) SO Avignon	French Championship	6th	French Cup	Quarter-finals	EC	2	-	-	-	-
1954-1955	(France) SO Avignon	French Championship	Semi-finals	French Cup	Winner	WC/T	9	15	5	-	-
1955-1956	(France) SO Avignon	French Championship	Semi-finals	French Cup	Winner		4	6	2	-	-
1956-1957	(France) SO Avignon	French Championship	Runner-up	French Cup	Semi-finals	WC	7	18	6	-	-
1957-1958	(France) Bataillon de Joinville	French Championship	6th	French Cup	Quarter-finals		1	-	-	-	-
1958-1959	(France) US Villeneuve	French Championship	Winner	French Cup	Quarter-finals						
1959-1960	(France) US Villeneuve	French Championship	Semi-finals	French Cup	Semi-finals		1	-	-	-	-
1960-1961	(France) US Villeneuve	French Championship	Semi-finals	French Cup	Round of 16	WC	4	-	-	-	-
1961-1962	(France) US Villeneuve	French Championship	Runner-up	French Cup	Round of 16						
1962-1963	(France) US Villeneuve	French Championship	Quarter-finals	French Cup	Round of 16						
1963-1964	(France) US Villeneuve	French Championship	Winner	French Cup	Winner						

== Legacy ==
A street in Souillac was named after him during his lifetime.
