= 1954 Rugby League World Cup squads =

The 1954 Rugby League World Cup featured the national teams (selected from eighteen-man squads) of four nations.

== Statistics ==
Match details - listing surnames of each team and the point scorers - were included in E.E. Christensen's Official Rugby League Yearbook, as was a summary of the players' point-scoring. This information is reflected in the Rugby League Project website.

== Australia ==
For Australian players, the World Cup tournament took place in 1954's post-season. Their coach was Vic Hey The team was managed by Spencer O'Neill of Parramatta, NSW and Jack McMahon of Queensland.

The Rugby League News published details of the touring team including each player's age and weight.

Banks, Davies, Flannery, Hall, McCaffery, O'Shea and Watson were selected from Queensland clubs. Pidding was selected from clubs in New South Wales Country areas. This lineup of the squad played for Sydney-based clubs during the 1954 season.

Player	Position	Age	Weight st.lb (kg)	Club	Games	Tries	Goals	FG	Points
Bob Banks	Five-eighth	23	12.10 (81)	Toowoomba Newtown	2	0	0	0	0
Roy Bull	Prop	25	14.7 (92)	Manly-Warringah	3	1	0	0	3
Clive Churchill	Fullback	27	11.7 (73)	South Sydney	3	0	0	0	0
Harold Crocker	Second-row	25	15.0 (95)	Parramatta	2	0	0	0	0
Brian Davies	Prop, Second-row	23	14.12 (94)	Booval Swifts	3	0	0	0	0
Peter Diversi	Lock	22	14.4 (91)	North Sydney	3	1	0	0	3
Denis Flannery	Wing	25	13.8 (86)	Ipswich Brothers	2	0	0	0	0
Duncan Hall	Prop	28	14.12 (94)	Brisbane Western Suburbs	1	0	0	0	0
Greg Hawick	Utility Back	22	13.5 (85)	South Sydney	2	1	0	0	3
Keith Holman	Halfback	27	11.9 (74)	Western Suburbs	2	0	0	0	0
Ken Kearney	Hooker	28	13.9 (87)	St George	3	2	0	0	6
Ken McCaffery	Five-eighth	24	13.0 (83)	Toowoomba Souths	1	0	0	0	0
Ian Moir	Wing	22	11.4 (72)	South Sydney	1	0	0	0	0
Kel O'Shea	Second-row	21	15.1 (96)	Ayr	2	2	0	0	6
Noel Pidding	Wing	27	12.0 (76)	Maitland	3	0	7	0	14
Norm Provan	Second-row	22	15.1 (96)	St George	1	0	0	0	0
Alex Watson	Centre	22	13.4 (84)	Brisbane Western Suburbs	3	3	0	0	9
Harry Wells	Centre	22	14.2 (90)	Wollongong	2	2	0	0	6

== New Zealand ==
- Manager: Tom McKenzie (West Coast)
- Coach: Jim Amos (Canterbury)

The Rugby League News published details of the Kiwi touring team including each player's provincial team, weight, height, ageand occupation.

Player	Position	Age	Weight st.lb (kg)	Province	Games	Tries	Goals	FG	Points
Doug Anderson	Fullback	27	12. 1 (77)	Auckland	1	0	0	0	0
Alister Atkinson	Lock	28	12. 10 (81)	Canterbury	3	0	0	0	0
Jim Austin	Wing, Centre	24	12. 2 (77)	Auckland	2	0	0	0	0
Lory Blanchard	Hooker	30	14. 3 (90)	Canterbury	3	0	0	0	0
John Bond	Prop, Second-row	22	14. 7 (92)	Canterbury	2	0	2	0	4
Jock Butterfield	Second-row	22	14. 0 (89)	Canterbury	2	0	0	0	0
Neville Denton	Fullback	20	12. 0 (76)	Auckland	1	0	0	0	0
Cyril Eastlake (c)	Wing, Centre	24	11. 9 (74)	Auckland	3	1	0	0	3
Jimmy Edwards	Wing	27	12. 0 (76)	Auckland	3	1	0	0	3
Len Eriksen	Halfback	27	10. 0 (64)	Auckland	3	1	0	0	3
Ian Grey	Fullback	23	12. 7 (79)	Auckland	1	0	0	0	0
Cliff Johnson	Prop	25	14. 3 (90)	Auckland	2	0	0	0	0
George McDonald	Second-row	20	13. 10 (87)	South Auckland	1	0	0	0	0
Ron McKay	Centre	22	12. 9 (80)	Taranaki	3	1	9	0	21
Bill McLennan	Prop	26	15. 10 (100)	West Coast	3	0	0	0	0
George Menzies	Wing	23	11. 4 (72)	West Coast	1	0	0	0	0
Bill Sorensen	Five-eighth	22	13. 4 (84)	Auckland	3	0	0	0	0
John Yates	Second-row	24	14. 11 (94)	Auckland	2	0	0	0	0

== Great Britain ==
For British players, the World Cup tournament took place during the 1954–55 Northern Rugby Football League season. Their coach was Mr Gideon Shaw.
The Rugby League News published the selected British touring team. The following seven players listed in this article did not play a match in the tournament: Billy Boston (Wigan), Willie Horne (Barrow), Geoff Gunney (Hunslet), W. Banks, Ron Rylance (Huddersfield), Alvin Ackerley (Halifax) and Johnny Whiteley (Hull).
English representative Phil Jackson was born in Canada. David Rose and captain Dave Valentine were representatives from Scotland, and John Thorley from Wales.

Player	Position	Club	Games	Tries	Goals	FG	Points
Gordon Brown	Five-eighth	Leeds	4	6	0	0	18
Bob Coverdale	Prop	Hull	4	0	0	0	0
Gerry Helme	Halfback	Warrington	4	2	0	0	6
Phil Jackson	Centre	Barrow	4	3	0	0	9
Frank Kitchen	Wing	Leigh	2	3	0	0	9
Jimmy Ledgard	Fullback	Leigh	4	1	13	0	29
Albert Naughton	Centre	Warrington	2	0	0	0	0
Don Robinson	Second-row	Wakefield Trinity	4	0	0	0	0
David Rose	Wing	Leeds	4	4	0	0	12
Sam Smith	Hooker	Hunslet	4	0	0	0	0
Mick Sullivan	Wing	Huddersfield	4	0	0	0	0
John Thorley	Prop	Halifax	4	0	0	0	0
Dave Valentine (c)	Lock	Huddersfield	4	0	0	0	0
Basil Watts	Second-row	York	4	0	0	0	0

== France ==
Coaches: Jean Duhau and René Duffort The French squad was:

Player	Position	Age	Club	Games	Tries	Goals	FG	Points
Jean Audoubert	Hooker	30	Lyon Villeurbanne	4	1	0	0	3
Gilbert Benausse	Five-eighth, Halfback	22	AS Carcassonne	2	0	0	0	0
Vincent Cantoni	Wing	27	Toulouse Olympique	4	2	0	0	6
André Carrère	Prop	30	Villeneuve XIII RLLG	0	0	0	0	0
Raymond Contrastin	Wing	29	Bordeaux XIII	4	5	0	0	15
Joseph Crespo	Halfback	29	Lyon Villeurbanne	4	1	0	0	3
Guy Delaye	Second-row	25	Sporting Olympique Avignon	3	1	0	0	3
Roger Guilhem	Lock	28	AS Carcassonne	1	0	0	0	0
Antoine Jimenez	Five-eighth, Centre	25	Villeneuve XIII RLLG	4	0	0	0	0
Joseph Krawzyck	Prop	-	Lyon Villeurbanne	4	1	0	0	3
Jacques Merquey	Centre	25	Sporting Olympique Avignon	4	1	0	0	3
Jean Pambrun	Second-row	24	Marseille XIII	4	0	0	0	0
Puig Aubert	Fullback	29	XIII Catalan	4	0	13	0	26
François Rinaldi	Prop	-	Marseille XIII	4	0	0	0	0
Armand Save	Second-row	23	Bordeaux XIII	1	0	0	0	0
Claude Teisseire	Five-eighth, Centre	23	AS Carcassonne	3	0	0	0	0
Gilbert Verdié	Lock	26	Racing Club Albi XIII	2	0	0	0	0
Maurice Voron	Wing	-	Lyon Villeurbanne	0	0	0	0	0

Note: The Rugby League Project has Roger Guilhem playing one match and Gilbert Verdié two, whilst EE Christensen's Official Rugby League Yearbook has Roger Guilhem playing two matches (the round matches against Great Britain and Australia) and Gilbert Verdié playing one match (the Final against Great Britain).
