= 1951 France rugby league tour of Australia and New Zealand =

- Manager: Antoine Blain
- Coach(es): Robert Samatan
- Tour captain(s): Robert Caillou and Puig Aubert
- Top point scorer(s): Puig Aubert 236
- Top try scorer(s): Vincent Cantoni 17
- Top test point scorer(s): Puig Aubert 42
- Top test try scorer(s): Vincent Cantoni 4
Summary
| P | W | D | L |
Total
| 28 | 21 | 3 | 4 |
Test match
| 4 | 2 | 0 | 2 |
Opponent
| P | W | D | L |
Australia
| 3 | 2 | 0 | 1 |
New Zealand
| 1 | 0 | 0 | 1 |

Tour chronology
- Previous tour: 1950 by
- Next tour: 1952 by to 1955 by

The 1951 French rugby league tour of Australia and New Zealand was the first ever tour of Australasia by any French sports team in history. Puig Aubert captained the France national rugby league team who played 28 matches in total in both Australia and New Zealand, winning 21 of them in what is regarded as the high point in the history of rugby league in France. The Australian Test series resulted in a 2–1 victory to France; however, the tourists then lost their match against the New Zealand national rugby league team. Welcoming the team home to Marseille, more than 150,000 people turned out for a street parade.

== Touring squad ==
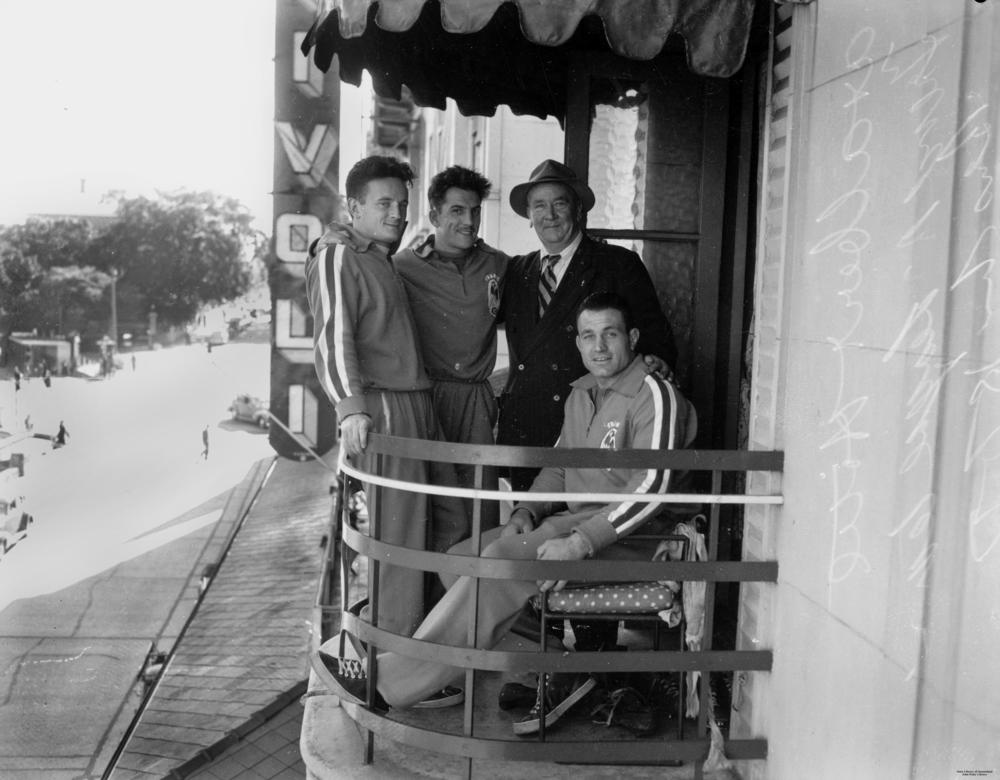
French rugby league tourists at a hotel in Queensland.

The French side was coached by former internationals Robert Samatan and Jean Duhau, and was captained by Puig Aubert. France had just claimed the 1950–51 European Rugby League Championship before embarking on the tour. The squad's average age was 26.5 years. The backs' average weight was 11.1 stone (70 kg) while the forwards' was 14.5 stone (92 kg).
Claude Teisseire, half back for Carcassonne and Lucien Barris, a forward, were initially selected in the squad but did not tour.
The Rugby League News published Player Details (Position, Occupation, Age, Height and Weight).

| Player | Pos. | Age (Note: Age as given in the Rugby League News for the first match against Sydney) | Weight | Club | Tests on Tour | Games in Aus | Games in NZ (Note: Other than the Test Matches, team lists for the tour matches in New Zealand not available to the author at the time of page creation.) | Tries | Goals | FG | Points |
|---|---|---|---|---|---|---|---|---|---|---|---|
| Maurice Andre | Fullback | 29 | 11 st. 11 lb. (75 kg) | Marseille | 0 | 10 | | 10 | 0 | 0 | 30 |
| Jean Audoubert | Hooker | 27 | 14 st. 8 lb. (93 kg) | Lyon | 0 | 11 | | 4 | 0 | 0 | 12 |
| Paul Bartoletti | Hooker | 27 | 13 st. 5 lb. (85 kg) | Carcassonne | 4 | 10 | | 2 | 1 | 0 | 8 |
| Maurice Bellan | Five-eighth | 26 | 11 st. 0 lb. (70 kg) | Lyon | 0 | 10 | | 3 | 0 | 0 | 9 |
| Andre Beraud | Prop | 28 | 13 st. 12 lb. (88 kg) | Marseille | 0 | 13 | | 12 | 0 | 0 | 36 |
| Élie Brousse | Second-row | 29 | 15 st. 1 lb. (96 kg) | Lyon | 4 | 12 | | 9 | 0 | 0 | 27 |
| Robert Caillou | Five-eighth | 33 | 11 st. 9 lb. (74 kg) | Bayonne | 0 | 10 | | 7 | 12 | 0 | 45 |
| Gaston Calixte | Lock | 27 | 13 st. 10 lb. (87 kg) | Villeneuve | 1 | 7 | | 1 | 2 | 0 | 7 |
| Vincent Cantoni | Wing | 24 | 12 st. 3 lb. (78 kg) | Bordeaux | 4 | 12 | | 17 | 2 | 0 | 55 |
| Gaston Comes | Centre | 27 | 11 st. 11 lb. (75 kg) | Perpignan | 4 | 10 | | 7 | 10 | 0 | 41 |
| Raymond Contrastin | Wing | 26 | 12 st. 1 lb. (77 kg) | Bordeaux | 4 | 14 | | 12 | 1 | 0 | 38 |
| Joseph Crespo | Halfback | 26 | 11 st. 4 lb. (72 kg) | Lyon | 3 | 11 | | 11 | 0 | 0 | 33 |
| Guy Delaye | Prop | 21 | 14 st. 4 lb. (91 kg) | Marseille | 0 | 7 | | 2 | 0 | 0 | 6 |
| Jean Dop | Halfback | 27 | 11 st. 11 lb. (75 kg) | Marseille | 2 | 12 | | 3 | 0 | 0 | 9 |
| René Duffort | Utility Back | 27 | 13 st. 5 lb. (85 kg) | Lyon | 4 | 11 | | 1 | 0 | 0 | 3 |
| Charles Galaup | Five-eighth | 22 | 11 st. 8 lb. (73 kg) | Albi | 1 | 11 | | 3 | 0 | 0 | 9 |
| Gabriel Genoud | Hooker | 28 | 12 st. 8 lb. (80 kg) | Villeneuve | 3 | 8 | | 3 | 0 | 0 | 9 |
| Ode Lespes | Wing | 27 | 12 st. 10 lb. (81 kg) | Bordeaux | 0 | 10 | | 4 | 0 | 0 | 12 |
| Michel Lopez | Lock | 30 | 16 st. 0 lb. (102 kg) | Cavaillon | 0 | 9 | | 4 | 6 | 0 | 24 |
| Martin Martin | Hooker | 28 | 12 st. 12 lb. (82 kg) | Carcassonne | 1 | 7 | | 5 | 0 | 0 | 15 |
| Louis Mazon | Prop | 29 | 13 st. 7 lb. (86 kg) | Carcassonne | 4 | 10 | | 1 | 2 | 0 | 7 |
| Jacky Merquey | Centre | 21 | 11 st. 0 lb. (70 kg) | Marseille | 4 | 10 | | 2 | 0 | 0 | 6 |
| François Montrucolis | Second-row | 26 | 14 st. 2 lb. (90 kg) | Lyon | 1 | 9 | | 2 | 0 | 0 | 6 |
| Raoul Perez | Lock | 28 | 14 st. 10 lb. (93 kg) | Toulon | 0 | 3 | | 1 | 0 | 0 | 3 |
| Édouard Ponsinet | Second-row | 27 | 14 st. 6 lb. (92 kg) | Carcassonne | 4 | 11 | | 3 | 0 | 0 | 9 |
| Puig Aubert | Fullback | 23 | 11 st. 0 lb. (70 kg) | Carcassonne | 4 | 17 | | 8 | 106 | 0 | 236 |
| François Rinaldi | Prop | 27 | 13 st. 7 lb. (86 kg) | Marseille | 0 | 8 | | 3 | 0 | 0 | 9 |

France's captain Puig Aubert had been offered a large contract to play in Sydney but returned to his homeland where he was voted French sportsman of the year.

== Australian leg ==
The tour's Australian leg featured games played in every mainland State capital except Adelaide, drawing a total of over 450,000 spectators.

Wednesday, 23 May
15:00

| Monaro | 12 – 37 | France |
|---|---|---|
| Tries; R. Alexander, D. Stewart, Goals; M. Preston (3) | Teams; Report; Database | Tries; Gaston Comes (2), Michel Lopez (2), Maurice Andre, Raymond Contrastin, Gabriel Genoud; Goals; Puig Aubert (7); Michel Lopez (1) |

Manuka Oval, Canberra
Attendance: 5,000
Referee: Arthur Nichols

Monaro: FB: Max Preston (age 20) ( Queanbeyan), WG: Don Stewart (24) ( Bombala), CE: Doug McRitchie (27) (Queanbeyan), CE: Tom Hodges (21) (Adaminaby), WG: Terry Fogarty ( Goulburn), FE: P. Schumack (19) (Bega), HB: Ken Brogan (c) (24) ( Cooma), PR: Ted Schell (19) ( Norths), HK: Ken Fogarty (22) ( Goulburn), PR: K. Barber (21) (Bega), SR: Bruce Grant (21) ( Eden), SR: Bob Alexander (26) ( Canberra), LK: Pat Rankin (20) ( Norths). Jack Melville ( Captain's Flat) was selected as a reserve, but did not play. Jack Southwell (25) ( Canberra) was selected, but withdrew due to injury.
France: Puig Aubert, Ode Lespes, Gaston Comes, Maurice Andre, Raymond Contrastin, Robert Caillou, Jean Dop, Paul Bartoletti, Gabriel Genoud, Andre Beraud, Michel Lopez, Élie Brousse, Gaston Calixte
The Daily Telegraph included a match report from France's tour manager, Antoine Blain, as well as their chief football writer.

Saturday, 26 May
14:30

| Newcastle | 8 – 12 | France |
|---|---|---|
| Tries: Brian Carlson, Frank Threlfo; Goals: Frank Threlfo (1) | Teams; Report; Database | Tries: Raoul Perez, Francois Rinaldi; Goals: Gaston Comes (3) |

Newcastle Sports Ground
Attendance: 21,480
Referee: Harold Gillard

Newcastle: FB: Les Milne (age 23) ( Maitland), WG: Jack Bradley (19) ( Souths), CE: Rees Duncan (20) ( Kurri), CE: Frank Threlfo (19) ( Maitland), WG: Brian Carlson (17) ( Norths), FE: Les Brown (27) ( Maitland), HB: Eric Long (23) ( Norths), PR: Charlie Gill (c) (29) ( Norths), HK: Jack Gordon (22) ( Waratah Mayfield), PR: Jim Evans (22) ( Maitland), SR: Albert Paul (23) ( Lakes United), SR: Don Schofield (20) ( Cessnock), LK: Ben Haslam (23) ( Centrals). Coach: Col Maxwell ( Maitland).
Two players were selected as reserves, but did not play: Barry Redding (23) ( Norths) and Pat Donnelly (21) ( Souths).
Newcastle played in red jerseys with a black V, rather than their traditional blue, to avoid a clash with the French jumpers.
France: Maurice Andre, Raymond Contrastin, Jacques Merquey, Gaston Comes, Vincent Cantoni, Maurice Bellan, Robert Caillou (c), Francois Rinaldi, Jean Audobert, Louis Mazon, François Montrucolis, Guy Delaye, Raoul Perez

Wednesday, 30 May
15:05

| Western Districts | 24 – 26 | France |
|---|---|---|
| Tries: Rolf Trudgett (3), J Birney; Goals: Oriel Kennerson (6) | Teams; Report; Database | Tries: A Beraud (2), Maurice Andre, Maurice Bellan; Goals: Puig Aubert (7) |

Spooner Oval, Forbes
Attendance: 5,950
Referee: Keith Rowan

Western Districts: FB: Oriel Kennerson ( Bathurst Charlestons), WG: Norm Jacobson (c) ( Condobolin), CE: Leo Nosworthy ( Narromine), CE: Jack Birney ( Coolah), WG: Max Smith ( Wellington), FE: Rolf Trudgett ( Wellington), HB: William Kelly ( Lithgow Arms Factory), PR: J. West (Orange), HK: Ian Walsh ( Condobolin), PR: Frank Hogan (Mendooran), SR: Len Kable ( Coonabarabran), SR: Ron Kelly ( Forbes), LK: Ken Slattery ( Canowindra), Coach: Les Lay ( Wellington).
Two players were selected as reserves, but did not play: John George ( Wellington) and W. Neil ( Cobar).

France: Puig Aubert (c), Raymond Contrastin, Ode Lespes, Maurice Bellan, Maurice Andre, Rene Duffort, Jean Dop, Francois Rinaldi, Jean Audobert, Andre Beraud, Michel Lopez, Édouard Ponsinet, François Montrucolis

Saturday, 2 June
14:30

| Sydney | 19 – 19 | France |
|---|---|---|
| Tries: Gordon Willoughby (2), Noel Mulligan; Goals: Johnny Graves (4); Bernie Purcell (1) | Program; Report; Database | Tries: Élie Brousse, Vincent Cantoni, Joseph Crespo; Goals: Puig Aubert (5) |

Sydney Cricket Ground, Sydney
Attendance: 44,522
Referee: George Bishop

Sydney: FB: Clive Churchill (c) (age 24) ( Souths), WG: Johnny Bliss (29) ( Manly), CE: Ray Thomas ( Easts), CE: Gordon Willoughby (24) ( Manly), WG: Johnny Graves (24) ( Souths), FE: Frank Stanmore (21) ( Wests), HB: Keith Holman (23) ( Wests), PR: Denis Donoghue (23) ( Souths), HK: Kevin Schubert (23) ( Manly), PR: Jack Holland (27) ( St George), SR: Bernie Purcell (23) ( Souths), SR: Noel Mulligan (25) ( St George), LK: Les Cowie (26) ( Souths).
Johnny Hawke (26) ( St George) was initially selected but withdrew, his place being taken by Thomas. Noel Pidding (24) ( St George) and Charlie Banks (24) ( Easts) were named as reserves, but did not play.

France: Puig Aubert (c), Raymond Contrastin, Jacques Merquey, Gaston Comes, Vincent Cantoni, Rene Duffort, Joseph Crespo, Paul Bartoletti, Gabriel Genoud, Louis Mazon, Édouard Ponsinet, Élie Brousse, Gaston Calixte

Wednesday, 6 June
15:10

| Riverina | 20 – 10 | France |
|---|---|---|
| Tries: J. Biscaya, P O'Connor; Goals: Les Koch (7/11) | Team; Report; Database | Tries: Maurice Andre (2); Goals: Puig Aubert (2) |

Albury Sports Ground, Albury
Attendance: 4,129
Referee: Noel Hedditch

Riverina: FB: Les Koch ( Gundagai), WG: Neil Kingsmill ( Albury Blues), CE: Bruce (Powderly, Powderley) Powdery (Boorowa), CE: Noel Bruce ( Junee), WG: John Biscaya ( Lockhart), FE: Rowley (Roley) McDonnell ( Cootamundra), HB: John Scott ( Young), PR: Don Milton ( Temora), HK: Peter Coupland ( Albury Blues), PR: Nevyl Hand (c) ( Gundagai), SR: Doug Piper ( Young), SR: Ray Green ( Cowra), LK: Peter O'Connor ( Harden).
Two players were selected as reserves, but did not play: J. (Buster) Harvey ( Young), Alan Glover (Boorowa).

France: Puig Aubert, Maurice Andre, Maurice Bellan, Jacques Merquey, Ode Lespes, Robert Caillou (c), Jean Dop, Francois Rinaldi, Jean Audobert, Andre Beraud, Guy Delaye, Michel Lopez, François Montrucolis

=== 1st Test ===
After five matches against New South Welsh teams, the French side played the tour's first Test match against Australia in Sydney. The two countries had played four Tests against each other previously, with Australia winning all of them.

Monday, 11 June
14:00

| Australia | 15 – 26 | France |
|---|---|---|
| Tries: Harold Crocker; Johnny Graves; Gordon Willoughby; Goals: Johnny Graves (3/9) | Database; Program | Tries: Vincent Cantoni (2); Raymond Contrastin; Gabriel Genoud; Goals: Puig Aubert (7/9) |

Sydney Cricket Ground, Sydney
Attendance: 60,160
Referee: Tom McMahon (Australia)

| Australia | Posit. | France |
|---|---|---|
| 1. Clive Churchill (c) | FB | 1. Puig Aubert (c) |
| 2. Johnny Bliss | WG | 5. Vincent Cantoni |
| 3. Gordon Willoughby | CE | 3. Gaston Comes |
| 4. Noel Hazzard | CE | 4. Joseph Crespo |
| 5. Johnny Graves | WG | 15. Raymond Contrastin |
| 6. Frank Stanmore | FE | 6. Charles Galaup |
| 7. Keith Holman | HB | 7. Jean Dop |
| 13. Duncan Hall | PR | 23. Paul Bartoletti |
| 12. Kevin Schubert | HK | 25. Gabriel Genoud |
| 11. Denis Donoghue | PR | 8. Louis Mazon |
| 10. Brian Davies | SR | 11. Elie Brousse |
| 9. Harold Crocker | SR | 12. Edouard Ponsinet |
| 8. Noel Mulligan | LK | 14. Rene Duffort |
| Vic Hey | Coach | Bob Samatan |

All of the French players selected for the Test had played in at least one tour match so far except their five-eighth, Charles Galaup who had only recently arrived in the country. The Australian team featured nine players from the Sydney team that drew with France nine days prior, in addition to four Queenslanders.

Puig-Aubert opened the scoring with a Penalty kick. At one point France led 16–0, but Australia came back, starting with a penalty kick by Graves. The half time score was 16–2.

Australia came back strongly in the second half. However, the game ended with the French celebrating their first ever rugby league victory against Australia. France's captain Puig Aubert was presented the Commonwealth Jubilee Cup after the match by the Governor General of Australia, William McKell.

Wednesday, 13 June

| Northern Division | 12 – 29 | France |
|---|---|---|
| Tries: Ron Madden, Morrie Murphy; Goals: Eric Fraser (3) | Team; Report; Database | Tries: Élie Brousse (2), Guy Delaye, Joseph Crespo, François Rinaldi, Ode Lespes, Michel Lopez; Goals: Robert Caillou (4) |

Rugby League Park, Armidale
Attendance: 6,000
Referee: R. Campbell

Northern Division: FB: Ken McCrohon ( Armidale), WG: Morrie Murphy ( Inverell), CE: Norman Young ( West Tamworth), CE: Jack Goldman ( Uralla), WG: N. (Coogan) Thornton ( Uralla), FE: Ron Madden ( Inverell), HB: Eric Fraser ( Moree), PR: B. Carlton ( Walcha), HK: Alf Hardman ( Moree), PR: Arthur Henderson ( Moree), SR: Les Gilmore ( Scone), SR: Barry Jackson ( Moree), LK: Cecil Bull ( Manilla).
Four players were selected as reserves, but did not play: P. Starr ( Guyra), Trevor Hong ( Armidale), R. Partridge ( West Tamworth), Neville Harrison ( Scone).

France: FB: Maurice Andre, WG: Ode Lespes, CE: Robert Caillou, CE: Joseph Crespo, WG: Maurice Bellan, FE: Charles Galaup, HB: Jean Dop, PR: François Rinaldi, HK: Jean Audoubert, PR: Andre Beraud, SR: Michel Lopez, SR: Guy Delaye, LK: Élie Brousse.

Saturday, 16 June

| Queensland | 22 – 22 | France |
|---|---|---|
| Tries: Des McGovern, Denis Flannery, Alan Thompson, Harold Crocker; Goals: Nev Linde (5) | Team; Report; Database | Tries: Joseph Crespo, Vincent Cantoni, Gabriel Genoud, Raymond Contrastin; Goals: Puig Aubert (5) |

Brisbane Cricket Ground, Brisbane
Attendance: 25,867
Referee: J. Hoffman

Queensland: FB: Nev Linde (age 24) ( Tivoli), WG: Denis Flannery (22) ( Ipswich CYM), CE: Noel Hazzard (26) (Bundaberg), CE: Rex McGlynn (24) (Bundaberg), WG: Des McGovern (25) ( Toowoomba All Whites), FE: Harry Griffiths (25) ( Booval Swifts), HB: Ken McCaffery (21) ( Toowoomba Souths), PR: Duncan Hall (23) ( Toowoomba Newtown), HK: Ron Davis ( Sarina), PR: Alan Thompson (28) ( Souths), SR: Bernie Drew (23) (Bundaberg), SR: Brian Davies (21) ( Brisbane Brothers), LK: Harold 'Mick' Crocker (24) ( Souths).
Two players were selected as reserves, but did not play: Alex Watson (18) ( Wests), Gordon Teys ( Toowoomba Valleys).
This match was Ron Davis' only appearance for the Maroons.

France: FB: Puig Aubert, WG: Raymond Contrastin, CE: Jacky Merquey, CE: Charles Galaup, WG: Vincent Cantoni, FE: René Duffort, HB: Joseph Crespo, PR: Paul Bartoletti, HK: Gabriel Genoud, PR: Andre Beraud, SR: Guy Delaye, SR: Édouard Ponsinet, LK: Louis Mazon.

Tuesday, 19 June

| Central Queensland | 14 – 38 | France |
|---|---|---|
| Tries: C. Harkin, Sid Irvine; Goals: Wal Gill (2), Reg Beath; Field Goals: Bernie Johnson | Database; Report | Tries: Gaston Comes (2), Jean Audoubert, Ode Lespes, Vincent Cantoni, René Duffort, Andre Beraud, Puig Aubert; Goals: Puig Aubert (5), Gaston Comes; Field Goals: Puig Aubert |

Murray Street Grounds, Rockhampton
Attendance: 4,598
Referee: Herb Gilbert

Central Queensland: FB: Alan Poole ( Brothers), WG: Sid Irvine ( Blackall), CE: Mick Hauff ( Blackall), CE: Wal Gill ( Barcaldine), WG: Leo (Jeffcoat) Jeffcoot ( Brothers), FE: Vivian (Mick) Irwin ( Blackall), HB: Bernie Johnson ( Longreach), PR: Mick Turnbull ( Blackall), HK: H. Johnson ( Railways), PR: C (Bow) Harkin ( Brothers), SR: Reg Beath ( Railways), SR: Norm Elliott ( Winton), LK: Trevor Whitehead ( Brothers).
France: FB: Puig Aubert, WG: Vincent Cantoni, CE: Maurice Andre, CE: Gaston Comes, WG: Ode Lespes, FE: Maurice Bellan, HB: René Duffort, PR: Andre Beraud, HK: Jean Audoubert, PR: François Rinaldi, SR: François Montrucolis, SR: Michel Lopez, LK: Gaston Calixte.

Sunday, 24 June

| North Queensland | 17 – 50 | France |
|---|---|---|
| Tries: Max Short (2), Jack Horrigan; Goals: Gordon Farrelly (4) | Teams; Report; Database | Tries: Raymond Contrastin (3), Vincent Cantoni (2), François Montrucolis (2), Gaston Comes, Joseph Crespo, Charles Galaup, Paul Bartoletti; Goals: Puig Aubert (6), Gaston Comes |

Townsville Sports Ground, Townsville
Attendance: 11,000
Referee: W. Morrison

North Queensland: FB: John Jabore (age 21) ( Bucas), WG: Terry Boland (24) ( Brothers), CE: Jack Horrigan (26) ( Ayr), CE: Frank Power (23) ( Brothers), WG: Gordon Farrelly ( Kangaroos), FE: Bob Banks (21) (Charters Towers), HB: Max Short (21) ( Souths), PR: Charlie Woods (29) ( Ayr), HK: Jim (Tom) Wedesweiler (24) ( Bucas), PR: Hume Ronald (21) ( Carltons), SR: Maurice Robertson (21) ( Brothers), SR: Roy (Blondi) Greenwood (23) ( Sarina), LK: Ron McLennan (26) ( Ayr).
Pat Harvey (Herbert River) was selected as a reserve, but did not play.
France: FB: Puig Aubert, WG: Raymond Contrastin, CE: Gaston Comes, CE: Joseph Crespo, WG: Vincent Cantoni, FE: Jacky Merquey, HB: Charles Galaup, PR: Paul Bartoletti, HK: Gabriel Genoud, PR: Louis Mazon, SR: François Montrucolis, SR: Édouard Ponsinet, LK: René Duffort.

Wednesday, 27 June
2.30pm

| Wide Bay | 19 – 44 | France |
|---|---|---|
| Tries: Ivan Lloyd-Jones, Tom Hooper, Dennis Jackwitz, N. Adsett, D. Nixon; Goals: Ivan Lloyd-Jones (2) | Report; Database | Tries: Maurice Andre (3), Martin Martin (2), Maurice Bellan, Robert Caillou, Jean Audoubert, Jean Dop, François Rinaldi; Goals: Robert Caillou (7) |

Attendance: 4,500
Referee: Stan Chambers

Wide Bay: FB: Ken Kennedy (Wallaroos), WG: M. Tickle (Gympie), CE: E. Barnes (Bundaberg), CE: Rex McGlynn (Bundaberg), WG: Ken Gayton (Bundaberg), FE: D. Nixon (Bundaberg), HB: N. (Tubby) Adsett ( Nambour), PR: Ivan Lloyd-Jones (Bundaberg), HK: Dennis Jackwitz (Bundaberg), PR: M. Kasmer (Bundaberg), SR: B. Long (Gympie), SR: Tom Hooper ( Nambour), LK: Keith Kendrick (Wallaroos).
France: FB: Charles Galaup, WG: Maurice Andre, CE: Maurice Bellan, CE: François Montrucolis, WG: Ode Lespes, FE: Robert Caillou, HB: Jean Dop, PR: Martin Martin, HK: Jean Audoubert, PR: Andre Beraud, SR: Guy Delaye, SR: François Rinaldi, LK: Michel Lopez

=== 2nd Test ===
After five matches against Queensland teams, the French side played the tour's second Test match against Australia in Brisbane.

Saturday, 30 June
14:30

| Australia | 23 – 11 | France |
|---|---|---|
| Tries: Denis Flannery; Duncan Hall; Keith Holman; Goals: Noel Pidding (6); Clive Churchill (1) | report | Tries: Jacques Merquey Goals: Puig Aubert (4) |

Brisbane Cricket Ground, Brisbane
Attendance: 35,000
Referee: Tom McMahon (Australia)

| Australia | Posit. | France |
|---|---|---|
| Clive Churchill (c) | FB | Puig Aubert (c) |
| Noel Pidding | WG | Vincent Cantoni |
| Col Geelan | CE | Gaston Comes |
| Noel Hazzard | CE | Joseph Crespo |
| Denis Flannery | WG | Raymond Contrastin |
| Frank Stanmore | FE | Jacques Merquey |
| Keith Holman | HB | Jean Dop |
| Alan Thompson | PR | Paul Bartoletti |
| Ernie Hammerton | HK | Gabriel Genoud |
| Duncan Hall | PR | Louis Mazon |
| Brian Davies | SR | Edouard Ponsinet |
| Bernie Drew | SR | Elie Brousse |
| Harold Crocker | LK | Rene Duffort |
| Vic Hey | Coach | Bob Samatan |

Only one change was made to the French team for the second Test: five-eighth Charles Galaup was replaced by Jacques Merquey. This time The Australian test team included six Queenslanders and returned to its winning ways with a 23–11 victory. Following a head clash with French prop forward Louis Mazon in the second half, Australian captain Clive Churchill was assisted from the field.

Tuesday, 3 July

| Brisbane | 16 – 17 | France |
|---|---|---|
| Tries: Wally McDonald, George Atherdon; Goals: Norm Pope (5) | Teams; Report; Database | Tries: Puig-Aubert, Ode Lespes, Charles Galaup; Goals: Puig-Aubert (4) |

Brisbane Cricket Ground, Brisbane
Attendance: 11,800
Referee: Vic Lynagh

Brisbane forward Bill Sims being tackled by French forwards Andrew Deraud and Guy Delaye.

France were leading 12–7 at half time. However, in the second half Brisbane captain and five-eighth, George Atherdon scored a try and his side was leading 16–15 with seven minutes remaining. France were awarded a penalty near the half-way line and Puig-Aubert scored a drop-goal from about 53 yards out two minutes from full-time. Aubert reached a points total for the tour of 112, thus passing Briton Ernest Ward's total of 106 the previous year.

Brisbane: FB: Norm Pope ( Valleys), WG: Wally McDonald ( Wests), CE: Alex Watson ( Wests), CE: Nev Wilson ( Souths), WG: Robert Kille ( Easts), FE: George Atherden ( Norths), HB: Ron Stanton ( Easts), PR: William Sims ( Wests), HK: Terry Coman ( Brothers), PR: Keith Blackford ( Wynnum), SR: Jack Fallon ( Brothers), SR: Brian Davies ( Brothers), LK: Harold (Mick) Crocker ( Souths).
The following were selected as reserves, but did not play: Doug Anderson ( Valleys), Len Blaik ( Easts) and Col McAllister ( Wests).
Alan Thompson ( Souths) was initially selected to captain the Brisbane side, but withdrew after acquiring an injury in the Second Test.
France: FB: Puig Aubert, WG: Maurice Andre, CE: Michel Lopez, CE: Maurice Bellan, WG: Ode Lespes, FE: Charles Galaup, HB: Robert Caillou, PR: Andre Beraud, HK: Jean Audoubert, PR: Martin Martin, SR: François Rinaldi, SR: Guy Delaye LK: François Montrucolis.

| July 7 | Toowoomba | 17–20 | France | Toowoomba |
| 2.30pm | Tries: 3 Gordon Teys; Pat McMahon; Max Higgins; Goals: 4 Ken McCaffery (4) | [Team; Report; Database Report] | Tries: 4 Joseph Crespo; Vincent Cantoni; Jacky Merquey; Goals: 4 Puig Aubert (4) | Attendance: 10,939; Gate: AU£ 2,197; Referee: H. Reithmuller |

Toowoomba: FB: William Sullivan ( All Whites), WG: Pat McMahon ( Souths), CE: Athol Halpin ( All Whites), CE: Sammy Hunter ( Souths), WG: Max Higgins ( Valleys), FE: Jim Heidke ( Valleys), HB: Ken McCaffery ( Souths), PR: Duncan Hall ( Newtown), HK: Kev Boshammer ( All Whites), PR: Jack Rooney ( All Whites), SR: Bill Beardsworth ( Valleys), SR: Gordon Teys ( Valleys), LK: Ron (Roy) Teys ( Valleys). Coach: Duncan Thompson (Toowoomba).
Bill Callinan ( Newtown) was originally selected, but withdrew. He was replaced in the line-up by Hunter.
The following players were also selected as reserves, but did not play: Des McGovern ( All Whites), W. Hookway ( Souths) and Neil Teys ( Valleys).
France: FB: Puig Aubert, WG: Ode Lespes, CE: Jacky Merquey, CE: René Duffort, WG: Vincent Cantoni, FE: Charles Galaup, HB: Joseph Crespo, PR: Gabriel Genoud, HK: Martin Martin, PR: Paul Bartoletti, SR: François Rinaldi, SR: Élie Brousse, LK: François Montrucolis.

| July 11 | North Coast | 9–33 | France | Oakes Oval; Lismore |
| 3.5pm | Tries: 1 Basil Cook; Goals: 3 Allan Lawson; Austin White | [Team; Report; Database Report] | Tries: 7 Élie Brousse (2); Robert Caillou (2); Puig Aubert; Maurice Bellan; Michel Lopez; Goals: 5 Puig Aubert (5); Field Goals: 1 Puig Aubert | Attendance: 8,710; Gate: AU£ 1,142; Referee: Frank McGuigan |

North Coast: FB: Allan Lawson (Coffs), WG: Ken McDonald (Taree-Old Bar), CE: Colin Sherwood (Murwillumbah), CE: Alby Duncan ( Bowraville), WG: Ron Algie (Taree-Old Bar), FE: Austin White (Taree Brown's Creek Taree), HB: Eric Carney ( Wauchope), PR: Basil Cook (Taree-Old Bar), HK: Kevin McKiernan (Kempsey CYM), PR: Bob Campbell ( Bowraville), SR: Rex Chaffer (Macksville), SR: George Alaban (Macksville), LK: K. Killett (Macksville).
J. McNamara (Bonalbo) was selected in the team to play South Sydney and France, but played only in the match against Souths on June 16. N. Walsham ( Grafton All Blacks) was selected as a reserve for both matches, but did not play against France.
North Coast played in black and white jerseys in both matches.
France: FB: Puig Aubert, WG: Raymond Contrastin, CE: Robert Caillou, CE: Maurice Bellan, WG: Ode Lespes, FE: Charles Galaup, HB: Jean Dop, PR: Andre Beraud, HK: Jean Audoubert, PR: Louis Mazon, SR: Michel Lopez, SR: Élie Brousse, LK: Raoul Perez.

| July 14 | New South Wales | 14–14 | France | Sydney Cricket Ground |
| 2.30pm | Tries: 2 Wally O'Connell; Fred Brown; Goals: 4 Noel Pidding (4) | [Program; Report; Database Report] | Tries: 0 nil Goals: 7 Puig Aubert (7) | Attendance: 45,579; Gate: AU£ 5,928; Referee: J. O'Brien |

New South Wales: FB: Clive Churchill (24) ( Souths), WG: Noel Pidding (24) ( St George), CE: Johnny Hawke (25) ( St George), CE: Col Cooper (25) ( Canterbury), WG: Ron Roberts (23) ( St George), FE: Wally O'Connell (28) ( Manly), HB: Keith Holman (23) ( Wests), PR: Fred Brown (25) ( Manly), HK: Kevin Schubert (23) ( Manly), PR: Denis Donoghue (23) ( Souths), SR: Noel Mulligan (25) ( St George), SR: Charlie Banks (24) ( Easts), LK: Les Cowie (26) ( Souths).
The following players were selected as reserves, but didi not play: Harry Wells (19) ( Souths), and Bernie Purcell (23) ( Souths).
France: FB: Puig Aubert, WG: Raymond Contrastin, CE: Jacky Merquey, CE: Gaston Comes, WG: Vincent Cantoni, FE: Charles Galaup, HB: Joseph Crespo, PR: Paul Bartoletti, HK: Martin Martin, PR: Louis Mazon, SR: Élie Brousse, SR: Édouard Ponsinet, LK: René Duffort

| July 15 | Southern Division | 13–24 | France | Wollongong Showground |
| 2.45pm | Tries: 1 Jack Seymour; Goals: 5 Bruce Smith (3); Jack McDonald (2) | [Teams; Report Report] | Tries: 4 Robert Caillou; Jean Audoubert; Andre Beraud; Guy Delaye; Goals: 6 Michel Lopez (3); Gaston Comes (3) | Attendance: 11,334; Gate: AU£ 1,585; Referee: Alf Grew |

Southern Division: FB: Ross Thomas ( Wollongong), WG: Terry Cook ( C.B.C.), CE: Jack (Johnny) Seymour ( Bowral), CE: Len Torpy ( Wollongong), WG: Arthur Thompson ( Nowra), FE: Johnny Rouse ( Nowra), HB: Jack McDonald ( Kiama), PR: Bill Burgess ( Wollongong), HK: Bill Bolt ( C.B.C.), PR: Jim Ralston ( Port Kembla), SR: Angus Miller ( Berry), SR: Bruce Smith ( Thirroul), LK: Don Townsend ( Port Kembla), Coach: Harry Nolan ( Wests).
Ian Moir ( Port Kembla) was originally selected in the team, but did not play. He was replaced on the wing by Arthur Thompson.
Les Gillard ( Picton) and Keith Clark ( Camden) were selected as reserves, but did not play.
France: FB: Gaston Comes, WG: Raoul Perez, CE: Maurice Bellan, CE: René Duffort, WG: Ode Lespes, FE: Robert Caillou, HB: Jean Dop, PR: Paul Bartoletti, HK: Jean Audoubert, PR: Andre Beraud, SR: Guy Delaye, SR: Michel Lopez, LK: François Montrucolis.

=== 3rd Test ===
The French team travelled back from Queensland to Sydney for the third and deciding Test match of the series. The Australians were slight favourites to win the match. People began to queue up in bitterly cold winds the night before the match.

Saturday, 21 July
24:45

| Australia | 14 – 35 | France |
|---|---|---|
| Tries: Brian Davies; Duncan Hall Goals: Noel Pidding (4) | Database; Program | Tries: Joseph Crespo (3); Raymond Contrastin (2); Elie Brousse; Gaston Comes; Goals: Puig Aubert (7) |

Sydney Cricket Ground, Sydney
Attendance: 67,009
Referee: Tom McMahon (Australia)

| Australia | Posit. | France |
|---|---|---|
| Clive Churchill (c) | FB | Puig Aubert (c) |
| Noel Pidding | WG | Raymond Contrastin |
| Noel Hazzard | CE | Gaston Comes |
| Norman Hawke | CE | Jacques Merquey |
| Denis Flannery | WG | Vincent Cantoni |
| Wally O'Connell | FE | Rene Duffort |
| Keith Holman | HB | Joseph Crespo |
| Denis Donoghue | PR | Paul Bartoletti |
| Kevin Schubert | HK | Gabriel Genoud |
| Duncan Hall | PR | Louis Mazon |
| Brian Davies | SR | Elie Brousse |
| Bernie Drew | SR | Edouard Ponsinet |
| Harold Crocker | LK | Gabriel Calixte |
| Vic Hey | Coach | Bob Samatan |

French captain and fullback Puig Aubert kicked 7 goals and his half back Joseph Crespo scored three tries as the tourists overpowered Australia to claim the Test series. This was the last test match for Australian five-eighth Wally O'Connell.

== New Zealand leg ==
| 25 July | West Coast | 2 – 5 | France | Greymouth |
| | Tries: nil Goals: 1 Nuttall | [Team; Report; Database Report] | Tries: 1 Gaston Comes; Goals: 1 Robert Caillou | Attendance: 3,667; Referee: Jim Griffin |

| 28 July | Canterbury | 7 – 13 | France | Addington Showground, Christchurch |
| | Tries: 1 Stapley; Goals: 2 Bond (2) | [Report; Database Report] | Tries: 3 Robert Caillou; Andre Beraud; Raymond Contrastin; Goals: 2 Gaston Comes (2) | Attendance: 13,000 |

France defeated Canterbury 13–7 in front of 13,000 at the Show Grounds.

| 30 July | Wellington | 13 – 26 | France | Basin Reserve, Wellington |
| | Tries: 1 English; Goals: 5 Mott (3); Church (2) | [Result; Database Report] | Tries: 6 Andre Beraud (2); Vincent Cantoni; Jean Dop; Ode Lespes; Louis Mazon; Goals: 4 Michel Lopez (2); Louis Mazon (2) | Attendance: 8,602 |

=== Test Match ===
4 August

| New Zealand | 16 – 15 | France |
|---|---|---|
| 2 Tries: Tommy Baxter; George Menzies; Goals: Des White (5) | Report Database | 3 Tries: Vincent Cantoni (2); Edouard Ponsinet; Goals: Puig Aubert (3) |

Carlaw Park, Auckland
Attendance: 19,229
Referee: Jim Griffin (New Zealand)

| New Zealand | Posit. | France |
|---|---|---|
| Desmond White | FB | Puig Aubert (c) |
| Bevin Hough | WG | Raymond Contrastin |
| Tommy Baxter | C | Gaston Comes |
| Maurie Robertson | CE | Jacques Merquey |
| Jack Forrest | WG | Vincent Cantoni |
| George Menzies | FE | Rene Duffort |
| Jim Haig (c) | HB | Joseph Crespo |
| Ken English | PR | Paul Bartoletti |
| George Davidson | HK | Martin Martin |
| Cliff Johnson | PR | Louis Mazon |
| Douglas Richards-Jolley | SR | Elie Brousse |
| Charlie McBride | SR | Edouard Ponsinet |
| Travers Hardwick | LK | François Montrucolis |
| Thomas McClymont | Coach | Bob Samatan |

New Zealand defeated France 16–15 in a "brutal match" at Carlaw Park. Des White kicked the winning penalty goal after the full-time siren had sounded to seal victory in "one of the most dramatic and dirtiest games ever played by the Kiwis".

First it was West Coast five-eighth George "Geordie" Menzies forced off with a cheekbone broken by a French head-butt. Then it was Otago's 1946 All Black halfback, Jimmy Haig with a broken jaw. Also Charlie McBride was bitten.

In the mid-second half, a brawl erupted amongst the forwards. French prop and national middleweight champion, Louis Mazon, was heavily involved. It took referee J. Griffen three minutes to separate the combatants. Ten minutes later, when the touch judges and officials intervened and things finally settled down, Griffen sent France's hooker Martin Martin from the field for throwing mud at him, but the Frenchman refused to go. The president of the French Rugby League, Anton Blain, and his New Zealand counterpart, Jack Redwood, came on and eventually persuaded Martin to leave the field.

No replacements were allowed so the game wound down with 11 Kiwis on the field against 12 Frenchmen. There was no ground clock or siren in those days and the players had to listen for the chimes from the nearby University of Auckland wedding-cake tower to get an indication of time remaining. They knew that it was usually all over by 4 pm, but this game went well past four.

In the final seconds of the match New Zealand wing Bevin Hough, a 1950 British Empire Games silver medal-winning sprinter, was heading for the Domain Stand corner and a certain try when he was taken out by a high shot from Cantoni. White was then called to kick. He backed up against the white picket fence sideline on the domain side, and sent the ball sailing between the posts, the crowd roaring before it got there.

The bitterness continued. One of the Frenchmen attacked Maurie Robertson, leaping onto his back as he left the field, and a touch judge was knocked to the ground. As the crowd gathered to congratulate the Kiwis, the French spat at them. Later however, at the after-match dinner the French were gentlemen, conceding victory to the better side. Puig Aubert shook White's hand and congratulated him on the match-winning goal.

The 50th anniversary of this match was commemorated during the 2001 French rugby league tour of New Zealand and Papua New Guinea with another Test between New Zealand and France in Auckland.

| 6 August | Auckland | 10 – 15 | France | Carlaw Park, Auckland |
| | Tries: 2 Cliff Johnson; Bevan Hough; Goals: 2 Des White (2) | [Report; Database Report] | Tries: 3 Élie Brousse; Puig Aubert; Martin Martin; Goals: 3 Puig Aubert (3) | Attendance: 30,000 |

Two days after the one-off Test match France returned to Carlaw Park to play Auckland. France won 15–10 in front of 30,000 spectators. Auckland included Des White, Jimmy Edwards, Tommy Baxter, Cyril Eastlake, Bevin Hough, Bruce Robertson, captain Des Barchard, Cliff Johnson, George Davidson, Graham Burgoyne, Doug Richards-Jolley, Clarence Hurndell and Allan Wiles.

| 9 August | South Auckland | 7 – 25 | France |
| | Tries: 1 Smith; Goals: 2 Travers Hardwick (2) | [Report; Database Report] | Tries: 5 Vincent Cantoni; Raymond Contrastin; Élie Brousse; Charles Galaup; Joseph Crespo; Goals: 5 Puig Aubert (3); Paul Bartoletti; Vincent Cantoni | Attendance: 7,480; Referee: Roly Avery |

During this match, French half-back Jean Dop was running for the ball when he was struck by a spectator, prompting police to move the crowd from the area.

| 11 August | Taranaki | 7 – 23 | France | New Plymouth |
| | Tries: 1 Casperson; Goals: 2 Kay; Mucculloch | [ Report] | Tries: 7 Puig Aubert; Maurice Andre; Martin Martin; Paul Bartoletti; Jean Dop; Vincent Cantoni; Andre Beraud; Goals: 1 Puig Aubert | Attendance: 6,473 |

== Australian return leg ==
Following the New Zealand leg of the tour, the French returned to Australia for another 3 matches before heading home.

| Wednesday, 15 August | New South Wales XIII | 29–11 | France | Sydney Cricket Ground, Sydney |
| 3.30pm | Tries: 5 Bryan Orrock; Nev Charlton; Ferris Ashton; Gordon Willoughby; Jack Lumsden; Goals: 7 Ron Willey (6); Jack Lumsden | [Program; Report Report] | Tries: 1 Vincent Cantoni; Goals: 4 Puig Aubert (4) | Attendance: 29,304; Gate: AU£ 4,037; Referee: Jack O'Brien |

A New South Wales XIII: FB: Ron Willey ( Canterbury), WG: Jack Lumsden ( Manly), CE: Gordon Willoughby ( Manly), CE: Matt McCoy ( St George), WG: John McClean ( Norths), FE: Greg Hawick ( Souths), HB: Col Donohoe ( Easts), PR: Bryan Orrock ( Souths), HK: Kevin Schubert ( Manly), PR: Fred Brown ( Manly), SR: Ferris Ashton ( Easts), SR: Jack Rayner ( Souths), LK: Nev Charlton ( Canterbury).
Kevin Woolfe ( Souths) and Tom Tyrrell ( Balmain) were selected as reserves, but did not play.
France: FB: Puig Aubert, WG: Raymond Contrastin, CE: Joseph Crespo, CE: Maurice Bellan, WG: Vincent Cantoni, FE: Charles Galaup, HB: Jean Dop, PR: Andre Beraud, HK: Martin Martin, PR: Louis Mazon, SR: Élie Brousse, SR: Édouard Ponsinet, LK: Gaston Calixte.

| Saturday, 18 August | Australian XIII | 17–34 | France | RAS Showground, Melbourne |
| 3pm | Tries: 3 Ken McCaffery; Brian Davies; J. Balmain; Goals: 4 Ken McCaffery (2); Clive Churchill; Kevin Woolfe | [Team; Report Report] | Tries: 6 Andre Beraud (2); Raymond Contrastin; Maurice Andre; Robert Caillou; Puig Aubert; Goals: 8 Puig Aubert (8) | Attendance: 4,460; Gate: AU£ 856; Referee: Jack Davies |

An Australian XIII: FB: Clive Churchill ( Souths), WG: Bill Dickason ( Victoria), CE: Kevin Woolfe ( Souths), CE: Noel Hazzard (Bundaberg), WG: John McClean ( Norths), FE: Greg Hawick ( Souths), HB: Ken McCaffery ( Souths), PR: Jack Balmain ( Victoria), HK: Ernie Hammerton ( Souths), PR: Gordon Teys ( Valleys), SR: Brian Davies ( Brothers), SR: Jack Rayner ( Souths), LK: Harold Crocker ( Souths).
Barry Pease ( Victoria) and Ray Jackson ( Victoria) were selected as reserves, but did not play.
France: FB: Puig Aubert, WG: Maurice Andre, CE: Joseph Crespo, CE: Robert Caillou, WG: Raymond Contrastin, FE: Charles Galaup, HB: Jean Dop, PR: Andre Beraud, HK: Martin Martin, PR: Jean Audoubert, SR: Édouard Ponsinet, SR: Élie Brousse, LK: Gaston Calixte.

| Sunday, 26 August | Western Australia | 23–70 | France | Claremont Showground, Perth |
| 3.20pm | Tries: 3 R. Quinlan (2); Joe Stewart; Goals: 7 Bob Sampson (7) | [Teams; Report Report] | Tries: 16; Vincent Cantoni (3); Andre Beraud (2); Puig Aubert (2); Robert Caillou; Raymond Contrastin; Maurice Andre; Jean Audoubert; Élie Brousse; Édouard Ponsinet; Martin Martin; Gaston Calixte; Joseph Crespo; Goals: 11; Puig Aubert (7); Gaston Calixte; Raymond Contrastin; Vincent Cantoni | Attendance: 14,500; Gate: AU£ 1,070; Referee: Herbert Fisher |

Western Australia: FB: Joe McGuiness ( Fremantle), WG: Bob Sampson (20) (Nedlands), CE: Norm Plester (18) ( South Perth), CE: W. Nicholson (Perth), WG: R. Quinlan ( South Perth), FE: Stan Saxon (20) ( South Perth), HB: L. Leavy ( South Perth), PR: G. Vooles ( South Perth), HK: K. Allen ( Fremantle), PR: R. Robinson (Eastern Suburbs), SR: Joe Stewart ( South Perth), SR: Bob Patching (19) ( South Perth), LK: Terry Sullivan (32) ( Fremantle), Coach: Arthur Folwell.
The following were included in an initial, extended squad, but did not play: M. Hawthorn ( Victoria Park), P. Hobart ( Cottesloe), K. Hodges ( Applecross), D. McDonald ( Fremantle), J. McDonald ( Fremantle), T. Myles ( Cottesloe).
France: FB: Puig Aubert, WG: Vincent Cantoni, CE: Joseph Crespo, CE: Maurice Andre, WG: Raymond Contrastin, FE: Robert Caillou, HB: Jean Dop, PR: Andre Beraud, HK: Martin Martin, PR: Jean Audoubert, SR: Élie Brousse, SR: Édouard Ponsinet, LK: Gaston Calixte.

== Sources ==
| Acronym | Item | Years | Database App | Notes |
|---|---|---|---|---|
Direct Online Access
| RLN | Rugby League News | 1920-1973 | Trove | Match Program in Sydney, Team Lists, Team Photos, Articles |
| RLP | Rugby League Project | 1907–present | RLP Website | Test Match teams & scorers. |
| Sun | The Sun (Sydney) | 1910-1954 | Trove | Match Reports, Articles. |
| DT | The Daily Telegraph (Sydney) | 1931-1954 | Trove | Match Reports, Articles. |
| CM | The Courier-Mail | 1933-1954 | Trove | Match Reports, Articles. |
| - | Various Australian Regional Newspapers | up to 1954 | Trove | Match Reports, Given Names of Players |
Offline Resources
| EECYB | E.E. Christensen's Official Rugby League Year Book | 1946-1978 | Copies at State Library of NSW | Teams, Point Scorers, Report. 1952 Yearbook covers the 1951 tour. |
| QRLG | Queensland Rugby League Gazette | 1950-1955 | Copies at State Library of Qld | Program for matches in Brisbane. |
| RRLG | Rockhampton Rugby League Gazette | 1951-1968 | Copies at State Library of Qld | Program for matches in Rockhampton. This collection includes a Souvenir of the First Visit of the French Rugby League Team to Central Queensland - Tuesday, 19th June, 1951. |
| TRL | Toowoomba Rugby League Souvenir Programme | 1951 | Copies at State Library of Qld | Program for the 1951 Toowoomba v France match. |
| - | Ipswich Versus International Teams | 1913-1975 | Copies at SLQ & NLA | Match Report, Given Names & Club of Ipswich Players |
| - | A History of Mackay Rugby League | 1919-2015 | Author's Website | Given Names & Club of Ipswich Players |
| - | More Than The Foley Shield | 1908-2014 | Author's Website | Match report, team photos. Given Names & Club of North Queensland Players |
