= Denis Donoghue (rugby league) =

Australia international rugby league footballer & RL coach

Personal information
- Full name: Denis Reginald Donoghue
- Born: 17 October 1926 Redfern, New South Wales, Australia
- Died: 5 December 1993 (aged 67) Randwick, New South Wales, Australia

Playing information
- Position: Prop
Club
Years	Team	Pld	T	G	FG	P
1948–57	South Sydney	171	25	1	0	77
Representative
Years	Team	Pld	T	G	FG	P
1950–54	New South Wales	10	1	0	0	3
1951	Australia	2	0	0	0	0
1950-1955	NSW City	8	0	0	0	0

Coaching information
Club
Years	Team	Gms	W	D	L	W%
1959–63	South Sydney	90	30	2	56	33

Denis Reginald Donoghue (1926–1993) was a champion Australian rugby league footballer, coach and administrator who starred in seven straight grand finals, winning 5, with the South Sydney Rabbitohs during their second 'Golden Era' (1949-1955), represented Sydney, New South Wales and Australia during the years of 1948–1957. He also fought as a boxer.

== Playing career ==
=== Club career ===
Returning from the War where he was a Royal Australian Navy Boxing champion, Donoghue commenced the shortest lower grade career in South Sydney history in 1948. After two games of third grade and just one of second, Donoghue cemented a first grade berth just four games into his career and stayed in the first grade team until retirement. His aggressive and relentless style of play ensured his rapid rise in the game.

A Rabbitohs legend and favorite son, Denis Donoghue played ten seasons for South Sydney between 1948 and 1957, playing 171 first grade games for the club and became a multi premiership winner with them.

He won 'man of the match' honours in Souths Sydney's losing Grand Final side against St George Dragons in 1949, and starred in their subsequent premierships in 1950 and 1951. Donoghue played in the controversial 1952 Grand Final loss to Western Suburbs, where the referee was accused of costing Souths the game. Winning back to back premierships in 1953–54, his last grand final appearance was in Souths miracle 1955 campaign. Losing stars Greg Hawick and Clive Churchill mid season and running equal last, the bunnies won 11 consecutive games to take out the championship, beating Newtown by a single point.

Denis Donoghue was a fearsome, tough forward, and a crowd favourite at Redfern. Judges like Tom Goodman were quoted in the press at the time stating "he was the best front rower in the code". A rock-solid defender and strong runner of the ball, his specialty was scrummaging. He was the backbone of the South Sydney Rabbitohs pack, playing in seven grand finals and winning six of them.

South Sydney's unbroken run of grand final appearances that began in 1949 stopped in 1956 when they lost the qualifying final to Balmain by 3 points in controversial circumstances. Donoghue played one final season after this.

He retired to the Wollongong competition in 1957, playing as captain-coach for one year at the Collegians, before returning to the South Sydney Rabbitohs as first grade coach for the next five seasons.

Donoghue took up the position of club president following his tenure as coach with friend and teammate Clive Churchill coaching the bunnies through their last 'Golden Era' during 1967–1971.

=== Representative career ===
Donoghue's representative career was plagued by injury. He represented New South Wales on ten occasions between 1950 and 1954. He also played in the winning 1951 City side that defeated Country, receiving man of the match honours. Donoghue was selected to represent Sydney against France during their 1951 tour of Australasia in a match that ended in a 19-all draw.

Donoghue was also part of the now infamous 1954 match between NSW and England at the Sydney Cricket Ground where referee Aub Oxford turned his back and walked off as almost all players stopped playing the game and commenced street brawling. To this day it remains the only top level game ever abandoned in rugby league history.

Selected for the Test against NZ in 1950, he was subsequently ruled out of the match due to injury. He debuted for Australia in 1951 against the touring French side, and was selected for the Kangaroo Tour in 1952. He broke his leg on the ship there and missed all six Test matches. Devastated, he immediately stood down from Test representative duties following it and refused to make himself available for selection He is listed on the Australian Players Register as Kangaroo No. 283.

== Post-retirement ==
One year after retiring as a player, Denis Donoghue became coach of South Sydney Rabbitohs in 1959 and stayed in that position until the end of the 1963 season. He recruited and/or developed many of the early playing careers of future stars such as John Sattler

He then became president of the South Sydney club in 1966 and stayed in the position through their third 'Golden Era' until the early 1970s. Under Donoghue's colorful presidency the bunnies won four out of five premierships in 1967–1971.

Denis Reginald Donoghue later owned racehorses and died on 5 December 1993 at Randwick, New South Wales, aged 67. He was cremated at Eastern Suburbs Memorial Park on 8 December 1993.

In 2007 he was named at 'prop' by a panel of experts for an Australian Team of the '50s.
