= Ray Thomas (rugby league) =

Australian rugby league footballer

Ray Thomas was a rugby league footballer in the Australia's leading competition – the New South Wales Rugby League (NSWRL).Thomas was born in 1930

Thomas played with two Sydney clubs during his career, the South Sydney Rabbitohs (1950 & 1957) and Eastern Suburbs Roosters (1951–53 & 1955). A centre, Thomas played in 52 matches for the Eastern Suburbs club.

After debuting with Souths, Thomas was suspended at the start of 1951 for failing to fulfill his 12-month residential qualification, as such had to return to Easts.

During his career Thomas represented both Sydney and New South Wales. He was selected to represent Sydney against France during the 1951 French tour of Australasia in a match that ended in a 19-all draw.
