= Ken English =

NZ international rugby league player (1927–2016)

Personal information
- Full name: Kenneth Hamilton English
- Born: 9 January 1927 Gisborne, New Zealand
- Died: 24 February 2016 (aged 89) Masterton, New Zealand

Playing information
- Position: Prop
Club
Years	Team	Pld	T	G	FG	P
	St. George (WRL)
Representative
Years	Team	Pld	T	G	FG	P
	Wellington
1951–52	New Zealand	1	0	0	0	0

Kenneth "Ken" Hamilton English (9 January 1927 – 24 February 2016) was a New Zealand rugby league footballer who played in the 1950s. He played at representative level for New Zealand, and Wellington, as a prop.

== Playing career ==
A New Zealand Police officer, English switched codes from rugby union in the later 1940s, joining the St. George club in the Wellington Rugby League.

In 1947 English was part of the Wellington side that defeated the West Coast 11–4 to win the Northern Union Cup for the first time. In 1949 he was part of the Southern Provinces team that held the touring Australian side to 17–15.

=== International honours ===
After a brilliant trial, English made his New Zealand national rugby league team debut against the 1951 touring French side. With teammate Johnny Dodd, English was selected on the 1951-1952 tour of Great Britain and France. He played in 14 games on the tour, scoring three tries, but never played another test match.

== Later years ==
English later served on the Wellington Rugby League board and was involved in acquiring Rugby League Park for Wellington. He was awarded life membership of both the Wellington Rugby League and the New Zealand Rugby League.

English died in Masterton on 24 February 2016.
