= Mick Crocker =

Mick Crocker may refer to:

- Michael Crocker, Australian rugby league footballer of the 2000s
- Harold "Mick" Crocker, Australian rugby league footballer of the 1950s
