= Johnny Bliss =

Australia international rugby league footballer

Personal information
- Full name: John Charles Bliss
- Born: 30 August 1922 Chinchilla, Queensland, Australia
- Died: 9 September 1974 (aged 52) Warriewood, New South Wales, Australia

Playing information
- Position: Wing
Club
Years	Team	Pld	T	G	FG	P
1942–43	Balmain	15	12	0	0	36
1944–46	North Sydney	35	27	0	0	81
1947–53	Manly-Warringah	71	41	0	0	123
	Total	121	80	0	0	240
Representative
Years	Team	Pld	T	G	FG	P
1945–51	NSW City Firsts	4	3	0	0	9
1947–51	New South Wales	6	9	0	0	27
1951	Australia	1	1	0	0	3

John Charles "Johnny" Bliss (30 August 1922 – 9 September 1974) was an Australian rugby league footballer who played for Balmain, North Sydney and Manly-Warringah in the NSWRL between 1942 and 1951.

== Rugby league career ==
Born in Queensland but raised on the Northern Beaches of Sydney, Bliss, nicknamed Blistering for his outstanding speed, was a scrawny Manly district junior who started out as a Hooker with the North Narrabeen Surf Club. He was shifted to the Wing as 16-year-old after his coach Tom Ballard saw him packing into a scrum and then showing incredible pace in general play. Ballard told him "You're too fast for a hooker boy - you're now on the wing".

As the Manly club wouldn't have a first grade team until 1947, he was graded with Balmain in 1939. He went to North Sydney in 1941 but the Tigers claimed him on residence grounds for the 1942 and 1943 seasons (at the time a player was bound to play for the club in whose city zone he lived and a transfer involved proving residence for 12 months prior).

Bliss's general play, speed and try scoring ability was first recognized in 1945 when he was chosen for City firsts in the annual City vs Country match. He would go on to play four games for City (1945, 1947, 1948 and 1951), scoring three tries.

In 1947 he moved to Manly and played on the wing in their first ever premiership match against Western Suburbs at Brookvale Oval, scoring a try in the teams hard fought 13–15 loss to Wests.

Bliss topped the try scoring for the North Sydney club in 1944 scoring seven tries, including a club record 5 tries in the 51–10 win over Easts in round 9 at North Sydney Oval, and again topped the list in 1945, scoring nine tries. He would also top Manly's try scoring list in 1947 and 1950, scoring 10 tries in each season.

In 1947 he played the first of six games for New South Wales, scoring a total of nine tries between 1947 and his last game in 1951. He was selected to represent Sydney against France during their 1951 tour of Australasia in a match that ended in a 19-all draw. He is listed on the Australian Players Register as Kangaroo number 281.

Also in 1951, Bliss was selected on the wing for Australia for the first test against the Puig Aubert led France at the Sydney Cricket Ground. France ran out easy 26-15 winners in front of 60,160 fans. Following a poor game in which he, along with several teammates were criticized for 'timid tackling' (even though he twice ran down French players saving what looked to be certain tries), Bliss was one of six players dropped for the second test held in Brisbane. This was to be the only international match Bliss was selected for in his career.

Unfortunately for Bliss, his form dropped off after his one-off test appearance and he was dropped from first grade before the semi-finals. He returned to the side for the final but missed selection in Manly's first ever grand final appearance against South Sydney that year through injury, Manly-Warringah went down 14–42 to Souths at the Sydney Sports Ground.

In total Bliss played 121 games and scored 78 tries during his NSWRL career. After his retirement, Bliss was the speed guru to several Manly players, including Bob Fulton, Graham Eadie, Russell Gartner and fellow beach sprint champion Nick Yakich.

== Beach sprinting ==
Bliss was also a beach sprint champion. He won 12 Australian championships in a row from 1939 to 1952. He attempted a comeback at the age of 38 to win the 1960 NSW title.

Johnny Bliss was an exceptionally fast runner. During the 1947 season, decked out in full football gear including heavy leather football boots and carrying a football, Bliss clocked 11.1 seconds over 110 yards (as a comparison, the Men's 100m Final at the 1948 Olympics was won in 10.3 seconds). Bliss also recorded 9.9 seconds over 100 yards.

== Personal life and death ==
Bliss was also a success in the world of men's toiletries and women's perfumery, working for two of the biggest names in the business, Faberge and Christian Dior.

Bliss, who was known as a practical joker and someone who loved life, died from the effects of a brain tumor on 9 September 1974, at the age of 52.
