= Audoubert =

Audoubert may refer to:

== Surname ==
- Jean Audoubert (1924–2008), French rugby player

== Place ==
- Tuc d'Audoubert, French cave
