= Jean Dop =

Former France international rugby league footballer

Personal information
- Born: 1 May 1924 Toulouse, France
- Died: 1 January 2003 (aged 78)

Playing information
- Position: Scrum-half, Fullback
Club
Years	Team	Pld	T	G	FG	P
	Marseille XIII
Representative
Years	Team	Pld	T	G	FG	P
1949–57	France	21	2	0	0	6

Jean Dop (1924–2003) was a French professional rugby league footballer who played in the 1950s. A France international representative scrum-half, he played club football for Marseille XIII.

Dop featured in the 1951 French rugby league tour of Australia and New Zealand, in place of injured scrum-half back Joseph Crespo. It was Les Chanticleers first such tour, but they lost only 4 of its 28 games, with Dop's dashing runs seen as instrumental in France's victory over Australia in the first Test. Also during this tour in a match against South Auckland in New Zealand Dop was struck by a spectator. He later toured with France playing at fullback. In 1988 he was inducted into the International Rugby League Hall of Fame.
