= François Rinaldi =

French rugby league footballer

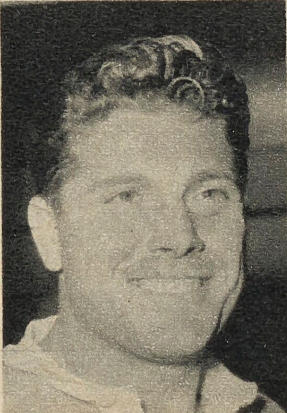

Personal information
- Born: 3 August 1924 Saint-Florent, Haute-Corse, Corsica, France
- Died: 10 April 2002 (aged 77) Ollioules, France

Playing information
- Position: Prop
Club
Years	Team	Pld	T	G	FG	P
	Marseille XIII
Representative
Years	Team	Pld	T	G	FG	P
1951–56	France	19	1	0	0	3
- Source: As of 17 January 2021

François Rinaldi (3 August 1924 – 10 April 2002) was a French rugby league footballer who represented the France national rugby league team.

== Playing career ==
Rinaldi played for France, including touring Australia and New Zealand in 1951 and playing in the 1954 Rugby League World Cup.

== Honours ==
=== Club ===
- World Cup
  - Runner-up in 1954 (France)
- Rugby League European Nations Cup
  - 1 time champion in 1951 and 1952 (France)
- French Championship
  - 1 time champion in 1949 (Marseille)
  - 3 times runner-up in 1950, 1952 and 1954 (Marseille)
- Lord Derby Cup
  - 1 time runner-up in 1957 (Marseille)
  - 1 time runner-up in 1955 (Marseille)
