= Élie Brousse =

France international rugby league footballer (1921–2019)

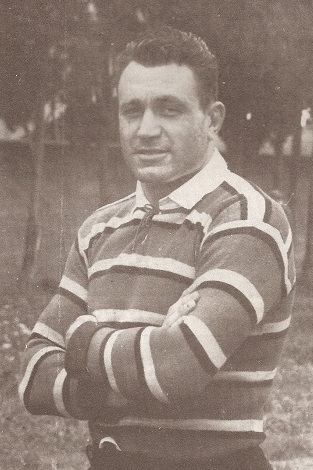

Personal information
- Born: 28 August 1921 Bages, Aude, France
- Died: 2 July 2019 (aged 97) Roanne, France

Playing information
- Height: 187 cm (6 ft 2 in)
- Weight: 98 kg (216 lb; 15 st 6 lb)
- Position: Second-row
Club
Years	Team	Pld	T	G	FG	P
1939–47	Roanne
1948–49	Marseille
1950–54	Lyon
	Total	0	0	0	0	0
Representative
Years	Team	Pld	T	G	FG	P
1946–53	France	31	3	0	0	9

Élie Brousse (28 August 1921 – 2 July 2019) was a French rugby league player for Roanne, Marseille and Lyon Villeurbanne in the French rugby league championship competition. His position of choice was as a second-row.

Brousse featured in the 1951 French rugby league tour of Australia and New Zealand, Les Chanticleers first such tour, during which they lost only 4 of their 28 games. Before the tour, Brousse had the nickname "The Good Giant" due to his large physique and good sportsmanship, afterwards he became known as the "Tiger of Sydney".

In 2018, Brousse was inducted into the Gloire du sport (France National Sports Hall of Fame).
