= Édouard Ponsinet =

Former France international rugby league footballer & coach

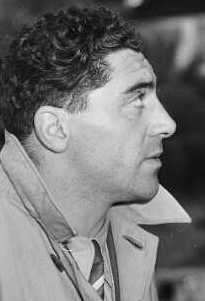

Personal information
- Full name: Édouard Ponsinet
- Born: 1923 Carcassonne, France
- Died: 22 October 2006 (aged 83) Carcassonne, France

Playing information
- Height: 182 cm (5 ft 11 1/2 in)
- Weight: 98 kg (15.4 st; 216 lb)
- Position: Second-row
Club
| Years | Team | Pld | T | G | FG | P |
|---|---|---|---|---|---|---|
| 1944–52 | Carcassonne |
Representative
| Years | Team | Pld | T | G | FG | P |
| 1948–53 | France | 19 | | | | 12 |

Coaching information
Club
| Years | Team | Gms | W | D | L | W% |
| 1953–?? | Lézignan |
- As of 30 January 2021

Édouard Ponsinet (1923 – 22 October 2006) was a French rugby league player for AS Carcassonne and club Lézignan in the French rugby league championship competition. He also represented the France national rugby league team on eighteen occasions; his position of choice was in the second row.

Ponsinet originally had his background in athletics and at the age of eighteen was a member of both the French junior triathlon and sprinting teams; a year later he was crowned French junior triathlon champion, and ran a one hundred metre time of 11.3 seconds.

In early 1940 Édouard was courted by French rugby league club AS Carcassonne but before he was able to play a competition game for the club the new Vichy government outlawed rugby league forcing all clubs to play rugby union or cease to exist. AS Carcassonne become ACE Carcassonne for a short time and played rugby union over the next three years, until the Vichy government was taken out of power and the Carcassonne club reverted to rugby league.

Over the next ten years with AS Carcassonne Ponsinet became a vital member of the club's first team helping them to achieve five French rugby league championship titles and four Lord Derby Cups. During these golden years with Carcassonne Ponsinet cemented his place in the French national side forming a lethal combination with fellow second-row Élie Brousse. Over these years in French colours on the international scene, Édouard became known as one of the premier forwards in the game, as in his strong performances against the Australians during their 1951 tour to Oceania.

He retired from the professional game at the end of the 1952 season, before accepting a job as a coach at the Lézignan club the following year.

Ponsinet died on 22 October 2006 at the age of 83.
