= Duncan Hall =

Australia international rugby league footballer

Personal information
- Born: 24 August 1925
- Died: 18 January 2011 (aged 85)

Playing information
- Position: Prop, Second-row
Club
Years	Team	Pld	T	G	FG	P
1945–47	Brothers (Rockhampton)
1948–49	Valleys (Brisbane)
1950	Home Hill (Foley Shield)
1951–53	Newtown (Toowoomba)
1954–57	Wests (Brisbane)
	Total	0	0	0	0	0
Representative
Years	Team	Pld	T	G	FG	P
1948–55	Queensland	25	10	0	0	30
1948–55	Australia	23	9	0	0	27
- Relatives: Duncan Hall, Jr. (son)

Duncan Hall (24 August 1925 – 18 January 2011) was an Australian rugby league footballer who played in the 1940s and 1950s, singled out as having been amongst the greatest of the 20th century. He played in the Brisbane Rugby League premiership for Fortitude Valley Diehards and represented Queensland and Australia. He has been named amongst the nation's finest footballers of the 20th century. Away from football Hall worked as a hotelier and bookmaker, and in his later years worked at the Broncos Leagues Club. His son Duncan Hall, Jr. played 15 rugby union tests for the Wallabies

== Playing career ==
Hall had a successful 1948–49 tour of England and France as a second row forward and later a front row forward. This gained him the attention of Sydney clubs, who were unable to sign him due to a ban imposed on the QRL at the time preventing interstate transfers of Queensland representatives who had played against New South Wales in the past 12 months. During the 1951 French rugby league tour of Australia and New Zealand he played in all three Test matches, scoring tries in the 2nd and 3rd. Hall was selected for Australia's 1954 Rugby League World Cup squad.

Representative

- Australia: 23 Tests (1948–1955) 2 Kangaroo tours
- Queensland: 25 Matches (1948–1955)

Clubs

- 1945 – 47 Christian Brothers (Rockhampton)
- 1948 – 49 Valleys (Brisbane)
- 1950 Home Hill (North Queensland)
- 1951 – 53 Newtown (Toowoomba)
- 1954 – 57 Wests (Brisbane)

=== Highlights ===
- Debuted for QLD & Australia in first year of Brisbane club football
- Won Bulimba Cup with Brisbane (1948–49)
- Member of QLD team to defeat Great Britain (1950)
- Won Bulimba Cup with Toowoomba (1951–52)
- JG Stephenson Trophy, 'Most Serviceable for QLD' (1951)
- Kangaroo Tourist (1948/49), (1952/53)
- Won Brisbane Rugby League premiership with Wests (1954)
- Pike Cup winner with Wests (1954)
- Gunner McCook Trophy, 'Brisbane RL Best & Fairest' (1954)
- President's Cup winner with Wests (1955–56)
- Coached Wests to President's Cup (1958)
- Co-manager Australian World Cup team (1977)
- Co-manager FIRST QLD State of Origin Team (1980)
- Prop Forward – ARL Team of The Century (April 2008)

== Post-playing ==
In 2000 Hall was awarded the Australian Sports Medal. In 2006 he was inducted into the Australian Rugby League Hall of Fame. The Duncan Hall Medal, is presented in his honour to award to the best and fairest player in the Queensland Cup.

In 2007 Hall was selected by a panel of experts at prop in an Australian 'Team of the 50s'.

In February 2008, Hall was named in the list of Australia's 100 Greatest Players (1908–2007) which was commissioned by the NRL and ARL to celebrate the code's centenary year in Australia. Hall went on to be named in the front-row in Australian rugby league's Team of the Century. Announced on 17 April 2008, the team is the panel's majority choice for each of the thirteen starting positions and four interchange players. In June 2008, he was chosen in the Queensland Rugby League's Team of the Century at prop-forward.

In 2008, rugby league in Australia's centenary year, Hall was named at second-row forward in the Toowoomba and South West Team of the Century.

Hall resided in a nursing home at Coolum, Queensland until his death at age 85 in 2011.
