= Frank Threlfo =

Australian rugby league footballer

Frank Thelfo
Personal information
- Full name: Francis Elwyn Threlfo
- Born: 9 June 1932 Maitland, New South Wales, Australia
- Died: 10 October 2012 (aged 80) Rutherford, New South Wales, Australia

Playing information
- Position: Wing
Club
Years	Team	Pld	T	G	FG	P
1952–53	South Sydney	39	24	0	0	72

Frank Threlfo (1932–2012) was an Australian rugby league footballer who played in the 1950s.

== Playing career ==
Originally from Maitland, New South Wales, Threlfo was signed by South Sydney in 1952 as a 20-year-old.

Threlfo played two seasons with South Sydney between 1952 and 1953, playing on the wing in 39 first grade games. He won a premiership with Souths, playing on the wing in the victorious 1953 Grand Final team that defeated St George.

Threlfo returned to Maitland, New South Wales the following year and saw out his rugby league career for the local Maitland team. He was awarded Life Membership of the Newcastle Rugby League, after a lifetime of commitment to Rugby League in Newcastle.

== Death ==
Threlfo died on 10 October 2012, aged 80.
