= Claude Teisseire =

France rugby league footballer (1931–2025)

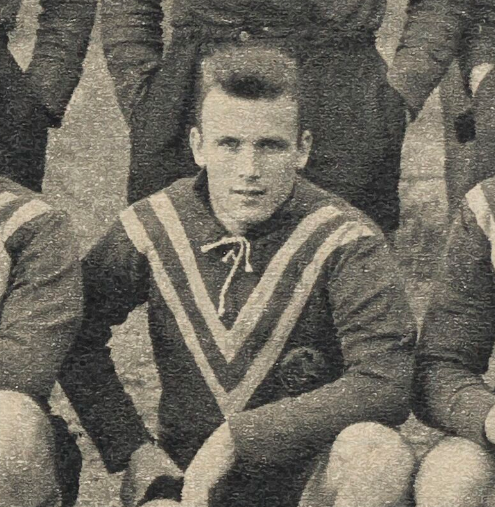
- Teisseire in 1953

Personal information
- Born: 14 March 1931 Carcassonne, France
- Died: 16 July 2025 (aged 94)

Playing information
- Position: Halfback, Centre
Club
Years	Team	Pld	T	G	FG	P
1949–58	AS Carcassonne
1959–62	Lézignan
	Total	0	0	0	0	0
Representative
Years	Team	Pld	T	G	FG	P
1952–62	France	17	2	0	0	6

Coaching information
Club
Years	Team	Gms	W	D	L	W%
	Limoux
	AS Carcassonne
	Total	0	0	0	0

Claude Teisseire (14 March 1931 – 16 July 2025), nicknamed The Rat, was a French professional rugby league footballer who represented France at the 1954 Rugby League World Cup. Although he could not take part in the 1951 tour of Australia and New Zealand due to a knee injury, he took part in the 1955 tour which concluded with two wins in three test matches. He played as halfback and centre. At club level, he played for AS Carcassonne and Lézignan. For many years, he formed a formidable centre combination with Gilbert Benausse. Later, he became a rugby union coach and referee.

== Career ==
Teisseire, while playing for Carcassonne, was called up for the first edition of the Rugby League World Cup in 1954, which was played in France. He took part in three matches of the tournament, including the final against Great Britain on 13 November 1954 at Parc des Princes in Paris in front of 30,368 spectators, won by Great Britain.

During his sports career, several rugby union clubs tried to sign him, such as Castres, Narbonne or Mazamet, but unsuccessfully, because Tesseire always preferred playing for rugby league clubs.

After his player career, he became coach and international referee, he notably refereed a match between Great Britain and Australia in Perpignan during the 1972 Rugby League World Cup.

In 2003, Teisseire was inducted into the Medal of Youth and Sports by the Minister of Sports and Youth Affairs, Jean-François Lamour.

== Death ==
Teisseire died on 16 July 2025, aged 94.
