= Ken Slattery =

Australian rugby league player and coach

Playing information
- Position: Lock
Club
Years	Team	Pld	T	G	FG	P
1953–57	Parramatta Eels	57	13			39

Coaching information
Club
Years	Team	Gms	W	D	L	W%
1957	Parramatta Eels	18	2	0	16	11

Ken Slattery is an Australian former rugby league player and coach.

A lock, Slattery was a product of rugby league in Canowindra, signed by the Parramatta Eels via Captain's Flat.

Slattery competed with Parramatta from 1953 to 1957, ascending straight to the captaincy his first season. He was tried on the wing during Parramatta's 1954 campaign and scored a hat-trick of tries against Manly. In 1957, Slattery also served as Parramatta coach. He earned NSW and NSW Country representative honours during his career.
