= Ken McCrohon =

Australia international rugby league player (1932-2018)

Personal information
- Full name: Kenneth John McCrohon
- Born: 1932 Tingha, NSW, Australia
- Died: 30 September 2018 (aged 85–86)

Playing information
- Position: Fullback
Representative
| Years | Team | Pld | T | G | FG | P |
|---|---|---|---|---|---|---|
| 1956–57 | Queensland | 8 | 1 | 1 | 0 | 5 |
| 1956 | Australia | 1 | 0 | 0 | 0 | 0 |

Kenneth John McCrohon (1932 – 30 September 2018) was an Australian rugby league player.

Hailing from Tingha, a town near Armidale, McCrohon was a NSW Country Seconds representative and trialled with Balmain while playing in Sydney, from where he got scouted to join Brisbane club Western Suburbs. He immediately became Western Suburbs's first-choice fullback and won premiership in his first season in 1954.

McCrohon was one of three fullbacks to feature for Australia during their 1956 home series against New Zealand, in the absence of Clive Churchill. He played the 1st Test at the Sydney Cricket Ground and was replaced by Gordon Clifford for the next match, with Norm Pope then playing the finale.

In 1958, McCrohon had a season as a player-coach with Kempsey.

McCrohon was the inaugural coach of Redcliffe in the Brisbane Rugby League premiership, leading the club for three seasons as a player-coach, before retiring from the sport.
