= Vincent Cantoni =

Former France international rugby league footballer & club coach

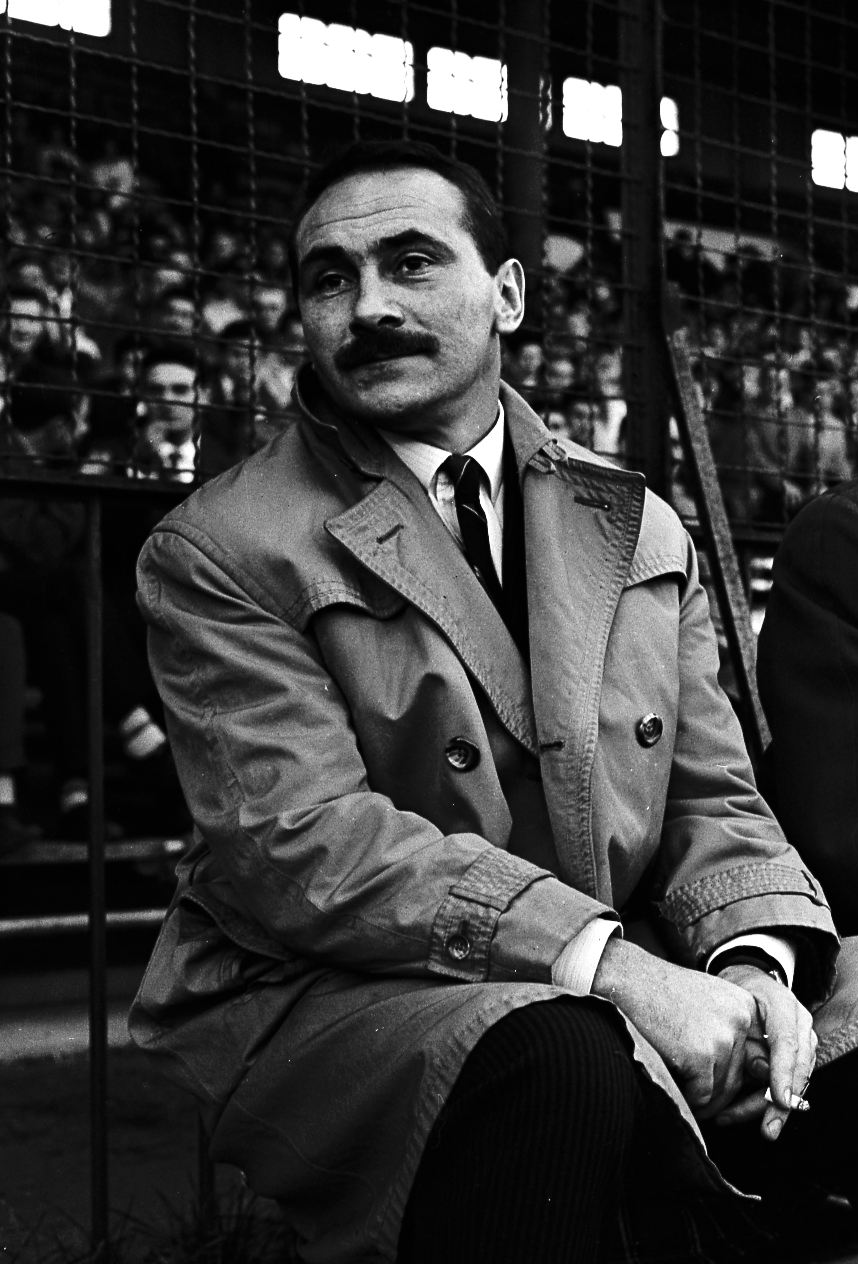

Personal information
- Born: 10 March 1927 Laguiole, Aveyron, France
- Died: 28 October 2013 (aged 86) Grenade, France

Playing information
- Position: Wing
Club
Years	Team	Pld	T	G	FG	P
	Toulouse XIII
Representative
Years	Team	Pld	T	G	FG	P
1948–54	France	25	11	0	0	33

Coaching information
Club
Years	Team	Gms	W	D	L	W%
1964–65	Toulouse XIII
- Source: As of 17 January 2021
- Relatives: Jack Cantoni (son)

Vincent Cantoni (Laguiole, 10 March 1927 – Grenade, 28 October 2013) was a French rugby league footballer who represented France national rugby league team in the 1954 World Cup. He was the father of the French former rugby union international Jack Cantoni.

Cantoni toured Australia and New Zealand in 1951 with the French side.

He died in 2013.
