= Guy Delaye =

Former France international rugby league footballer

Personal information
- Born: 4 October 1929 Caluire-et-Cuire, Lyon Metropolis, Auvergne-Rhône-Alpes, France
- Died: 28 August 1986 (aged 56) Marseille, France

Playing information
- Position: Second-row
Club
Years	Team	Pld	T	G	FG	P
	Marseille
1952–55	Avignon	5
	Total	5	0	0	0	0
Representative
Years	Team	Pld	T	G	FG	P
1952–55	France	5	1	0	0	3
- Source: As of 17 January 2021

Guy Delaye is a French former professional rugby league footballer who represented France in the 1954 Rugby League World Cup, as a loose forward.

== Career ==
Delaye, then playing for Marseille XIII, was called up to play the 1954 Rugby League World Cup which was played in France. He takes part to the first two matches of the tournament, remaining in the reserves during the final against Great Britain, the latter winning the tournament.
