= Marseille XIII Avenir =

French rugby league club

Club information
- Full name: Marseille XIII Avenir
- Nickname(s): Les Lions
- Founded: 2007; 18 years ago
- Website: Website

Current details
- Ground(s): Stade Roger Couderc
- Chairman: Stephane Puggioni
- Coach: Christophe Quercia
- Manager: Eric Dravet

Uniforms
Home colours	Away colours

Marseille XIII Avenir are a French Rugby league club based in Marseille, Bouches-du-Rhône in the Provence-Alpes-Côte d'Azur region. The club was in 2007 following the demise of Marseille XIII. It plays its matches at the Stade Roger Couderc. In addition to the open age team, the club also has a women's team and a thriving junior section.

== History ==
=== Marseille XIII ===
Marseille XIII were formed in 1946. They won the French Championship once, in the 1948–49 season, and the Lord Derby Cup five times. They were relegated from the Elite 1 division at the end of the 2005–06 season. The following season Marseille XIII were declared bankrupt and wound up.

=== Marseille XIII Avenir ===
Born out of the ashes of the original club, Avenir were forced to start the following season, 2007–08, in the 3rd tier of French rugby league, the National Division 1. Since the reformation the club's juniors have been crowned champions in 2009 and the women's team after finishing runner-up in 2011 lifted the title in 2012. At the end of 2015–16 season the club were relegated to the 4th tier National Division 2.

In the 2021–22 season the club competed in the Federal Division, but withdrew from the competition in February 2022 due to a lack of personnel.
