= Gilbert Verdié =

Former France international rugby league footballer

Personal information
- Born: 29 June 1928 Decazeville, Aveyron, Occitania, France
- Died: 25 November 2015 (aged 87) Albi, France

Playing information
- Position: Second-row
Club
Years	Team	Pld	T	G	FG	P
	Racing Club Albi XIII
Representative
Years	Team	Pld	T	G	FG	P
1954–58	France	7	0	0	0	0
- Source: As of 17 January 2021

Gilbert Verdié (Decazeville, 29 June 1928 - Albi, 25 November 2015) was a French rugby league player who represented France in two Rugby League World Cups.

== Biography ==
Gilbert Verdié, then playing in Albi, was called upon to compete in the first edition of the 1954 Rugby League World Cup which took place in France. He participated in two edition meetings including the final against Great Britain on 13 November 1954 at the Parc des Princes in Paris in front of 30,368 spectators but could not prevent Great Britain from raising their first World Cup title.
