= Raymond Contrastin =

Former France international rugby league footballer

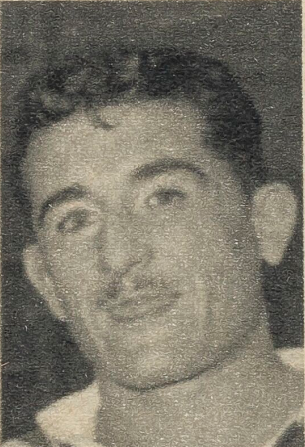

Personal information
- Born: 5 April 1925 Agen, France
- Died: 1985 (aged 59–60)

Playing information

Rugby union
Club
Years	Team	Pld	T	G	FG	P
19??–47	Condom

Rugby league
- Position: Prop
Club
Years	Team	Pld	T	G	FG	P
1947–50	RC Roanne XIII
1950–58	Bordeaux
	Total	0	0	0	0	0
Representative
Years	Team	Pld	T	G	FG	P
1948–58	France	33	24	0	0	72
- Source: As of 17 January 2021

Raymond Contrastin (born in Agen, on 5 April 1925 – 1985) was a French rugby league footballer who played in the 1950s. A France international representative winger, he has been inducted into the International Rugby League Hall of Fame.

He started playing rugby union for SA Condom until 1947, before joining RC Roanne XIII, with which he was French champion in 1928 and for Bordeaux XIII, with which he won the 1954 title. Contrastin featured in the 1951 French rugby league tour of Australia and New Zealand, Les Chanticleers first such tour, during which they lost four of their 28 games.

He played for France during the 1954 Rugby League World Cup, including the final against Great Britain in which he scored a try.
