= Harold Crocker =

Australia international rugby league footballer

Personal information
- Born: 14 December 1927 Brisbane, Queensland, Australia
- Died: 11 December 2014 (aged 86)

Playing information
- Weight: 14.5 st (92 kg)
- Position: Lock, Second-row
Club
Years	Team	Pld	T	G	FG	P
194?–53	Souths (Brisbane)
1954–55	Parramatta	25	4	0	0	12
	Total	25	4	0	0	12
Representative
Years	Team	Pld	T	G	FG	P
1949–53	Queensland	19	1	0	0	3
1950–55	Australia	17	3	0	0	6

Harold "Mick" Crocker (14 December 1927 – 11 December 2014) was an Australian professional rugby league footballer who played in the 1940s and 1950s. An Australia national and Queensland state representative back-row forward, he played his club career in Brisbane with Souths and in Sydney with Parramatta.

After a successful career as a Queensland and then Australian international representative, in the 1954 pre-season Crocker signed a then-record one-season deal for an Australian to move south and play for Sydney club Parramatta in order to assist his family who had lost their home in a fire the previous year. Parramatta finished the 1954 NSWRFL season with the wooden spoon however. In the postseason Crocker was selected for the Australian national team's campaign for the 1954 Rugby League World Cup tournament, the first ever, which was held in France. Crocker didn't play in the Kangaroos' first match which was lost to Great Britain, but was selected as a second-row forward for the second match against New Zealand which Australia won. He played in the third match against France which the Australians lost, meaning they would fail to reach the final. He is listed on the Australian Players Register as Kangaroo No. 278. The following season was Crocker's last in the NSWRFL Premiership's first grade.

In 2009 Crocker was inducted into the Queensland Sport Hall of Fame.
