= Jean Audoubert =

Former France international rugby league footballer

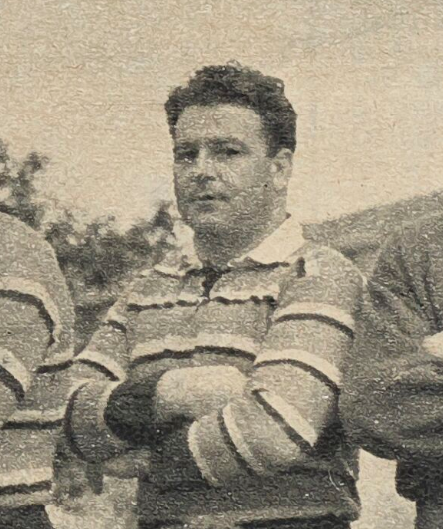
- Born: 7 April 1924 Lorp-Sentaraille, Ariège, Occitania, France
- Died: 21 June 2008 (aged 84) Lorp-Sentaraille, France

Rugby union career
- Position: Hooker
Senior career
| Years | Team | Apps | (Points) |
- Saint-Girons
- Castres Olympique
- Rugby league career

Playing information
Club
| Years | Team | Pld | T | G | FG | P |
|---|---|---|---|---|---|---|
| 1945–48 | Toulouse Olympique |
| 1948–49 | RC Roanne XIII |
| 1949–56 | Lyon Villeurbanne XIII |
| | Total | 0 | 0 | 0 | 0 | 0 |
Representative
| Years | Team | Pld | T | G | FG | P |
| 1952–56 | France | 16 | 1 | 0 | 0 | 3 |

Jean Audoubert (7 April 1924 – 21 June 2008) was a French rugby league player who represented France in the 1951 tour of Australia and New Zealand and the 1954 Rugby League World Cup. He was nicknamed Monseigneur.
