= Marseille XIII =

Defunct French rugby league club

- Lion

Club information
- Full name: Marseille XIII Rugby League
- Colours: Sky blue and navy blue
- Founded: 1946; 80 years ago
- Exited: 2006; 20 years ago
- Website: www.marseille13.org

Former details
- Ground: Stade Joseph Boyadijian
- Competition: French Championship

Marseille XIII was a French rugby league club from the city of Marseille.

== History ==
Marseille XIII were founded in 1946. The club only won the French Championship once, in the 1948–49 season, and reached the final on three other occasions, in 1950, 1952 and 1973. In the Lord Derby Cup, the club appeared in the final seven times and won five times.

In the 2004–05 season, Marseille XIII won the Elite 2 championship defeating RC Carpentras 12–10 in the final. They moved up to the Elite 1 division for the 2005–06. The following season Marseille XIII were declared bankrupt and wound up.

A new club, Marseille XIII Avenir, was founded from the ashes in 2007.

== Honours ==
League
- French Championship: 1948–49
- Elite 2: 2004–05
Cup
- Lord Derby Cup (5): 1947–48, 1948–49, 1956–57, 1964–65, 1970-71
