= Rugby league positions =

13 on-field positions in the sport

A rugby league team consists of 13 players on the field, with four interchange players on the bench. Each of the 13 players is assigned a position, normally with a standardised number, which reflects their role in attack and defence, although players can take up any position at any time.

Players are divided into two general types, forwards and backs. Forwards are generally chosen for their size and strength. They are expected to run with the ball, to attack, and to make tackles. Forwards are required to improve the team's field position, thus creating space and time for the backs. Backs are usually smaller and faster, though a big, fast player can be of advantage in the backs. Their roles require speed and ball-playing skills, rather than just strength, to take advantage of the field position gained by the forwards. Typically forwards tend to operate in the centre of the field, while backs operate nearer to the touch-lines, where more space can usually be found.

Four positions - fullback, five-eighth, halfback and hooker - are sometimes referred to as the team's "spine" owing to their importance in developing plays.

== Names and numbering ==
The positions and the numbers are defined by the game's laws as:

Backs

- 1 Full Back
- 2 Right Wing
- 3 Right Centre
- 4 Left Centre
- 5 Left Wing
- 6 Stand off or five eighth
- 7 Scrum Half

Forwards

- 8 Prop
- 9 Hooker
- 10 Prop
- 11 Second Row Forward
- 12 Second Row Forward
- 13 Loose or Lock Forward

== Backs ==
There are seven backs, numbered 1 to 7. For these positions, the emphasis is on speed and ball-handling skills. Generally, the "back-line" consists of smaller, more agile players.

=== Fullback ===
Numbered 1, the fullback's primary role is the last line of defence, standing behind the main line of defenders. Defensively, fullbacks must be able to chase and tackle any player who breaks the first line of defence, and must be able to catch and return kicks made by the attacking side. Their role in attack is usually as a support player, and they are often used to come into the line to create an overlap in attack. Fullbacks that feature in their respective nations' rugby league halls of fame are France's Puig Aubert, Australia's Clive Churchill, Charles Fraser, Graeme Langlands, Graham Eadie and Billy Slater, Great Britain/Wales' Jim Sullivan, Great Britain's Kris Radlinski and New Zealand's Des White.

=== Threequarters ===
There are four threequarters: two wingers and two centres - right wing (2), right centre (3), left centre (4) and left wing (5). Typically these players work in pairs, with one winger and one centre occupying each side of the field.

==== Wing ====
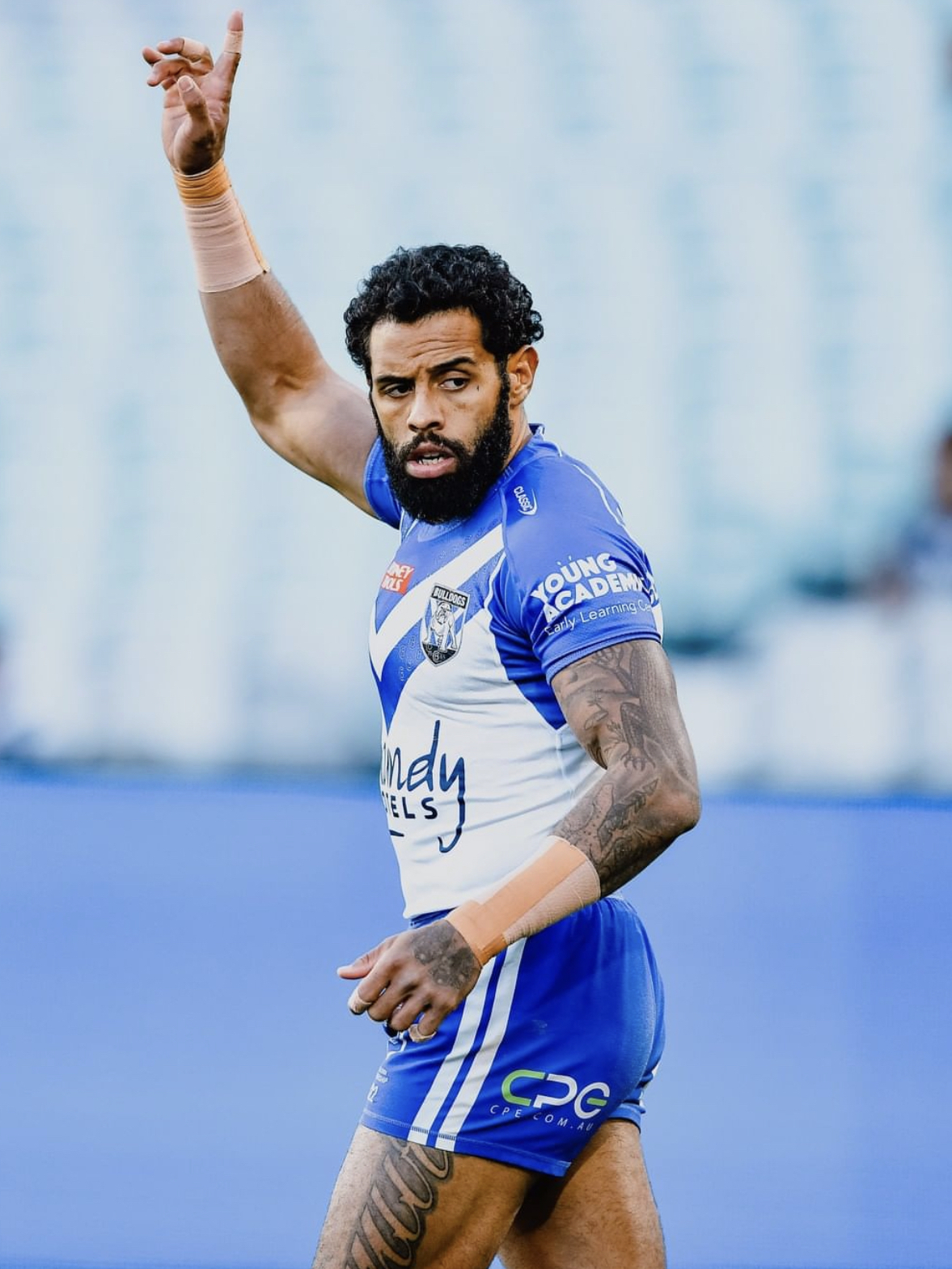
Winger Josh Addo-Carr playing for Canterbury-Bankstown Bulldogs

Also known as wingers. There are two wings in a rugby league team, numbered 2 and 5. They are usually positioned closest to the touch-line on each side of the field. They are generally among the fastest players in a team, with the speed to exploit space that is created for them and finish an attacking move. In defence their primary role is to mark their opposing wingers, and they are also usually required to catch and return kicks made by an attacking team, often dropping behind the defensive line to help the fullback. Wingers that feature in their nations' rugby league halls of fame are Great Britain's Billy Batten, Billy Boston and Clive Sullivan, Australia's Brian Bevan, Ken Irvine, Harold Horder and Brian Carlson, South African Tom van Vollenhoven and France's Raymond Contrastin.

==== Centre ====
There are only two centres, right and left, numbered 3 and 4 respectively. They are usually positioned just inside the wingers and are typically the second-closest players to the touch-line on each side of the field. In attack their primary role is to provide an attacking threat out wide and as such they often need to be some of the fastest players on the pitch, often providing the pass for their winger to finish off a move, by drawing and passing to give the fast wingers space to move. In defence, they are expected to mark their opposite centre. Centres that feature in their countries' halls of fame include France's Max Rousié, England's Eric Ashton, Harold Wagstaff and Neil Fox, Wales' Gus Risman and Australia's Reg Gasnier, Dally Messenger, Dave Brown, Jim Craig, Bob Fulton, Mal Meninga, and Greg Inglis.

=== Half pair ===
There are two halves. Positioned more centrally in attack, beside or behind the forwards, they direct the ball and are usually the team's main play-makers, and as such are typically required to be the most skillful and intelligent players on the team. These players also usually perform most tactical kicking for their team.

==== Stand-off / five-eighth ====
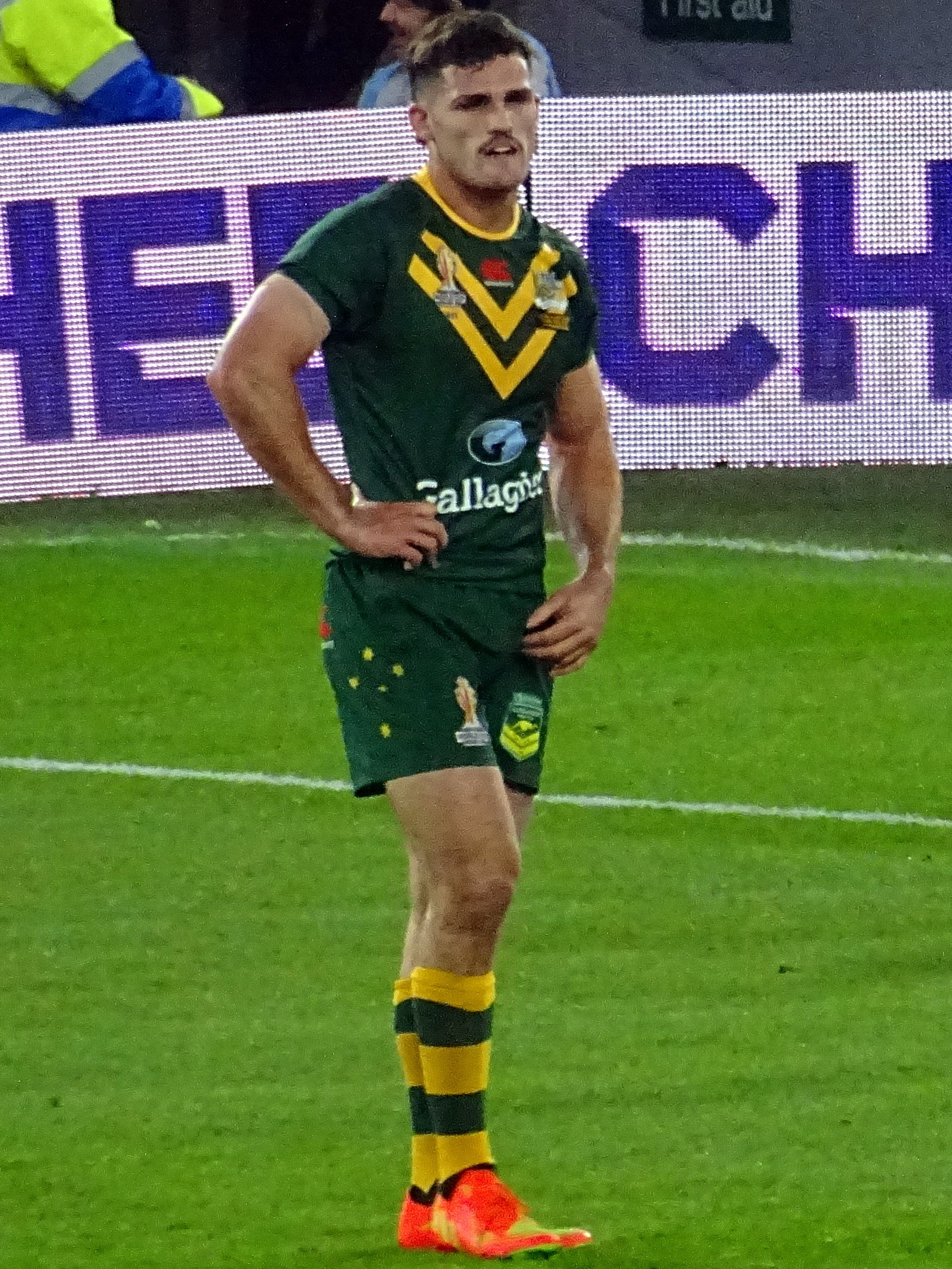
Penrith Panthers halfback Nathan Cleary playing for Australia in the 2021 Rugby League World Cup

Numbered 6, the stand-off or five-eighth is usually a strong passer and runner, while also being agile. Often this player is referred to as "second receiver", as in attacking situations they are typically the second player to receive the ball (after the half-back) and are then able to initiate an attacking move.

==== Scrum-half / half-back ====
Numbered 7, the scrum-half or half-back is usually involved in directing the team's play. The position is sometimes referred to as "first receiver", as half-backs are often the first to receive the ball from the dummy-half after a play-the-ball. This makes them important decision-makers in attack.

== Forwards ==
A rugby league forward pack consists of six players who tend to be bigger and stronger than backs, and generally rely more on their strength and size to fulfill their roles than play-making skills. The forwards also traditionally formed and contested scrums; however, in the modern game it is largely immaterial which players pack down in the scrum. Despite this, forwards are still referred to by the position they would traditionally take in the scrum.

=== Front row ===
The front row of the scrum traditionally included the hooker with the two props on either side. All three may be referred to as front-rowers, but this term is now most commonly just used as a colloquialism to refer to the props.

==== Hooker ====
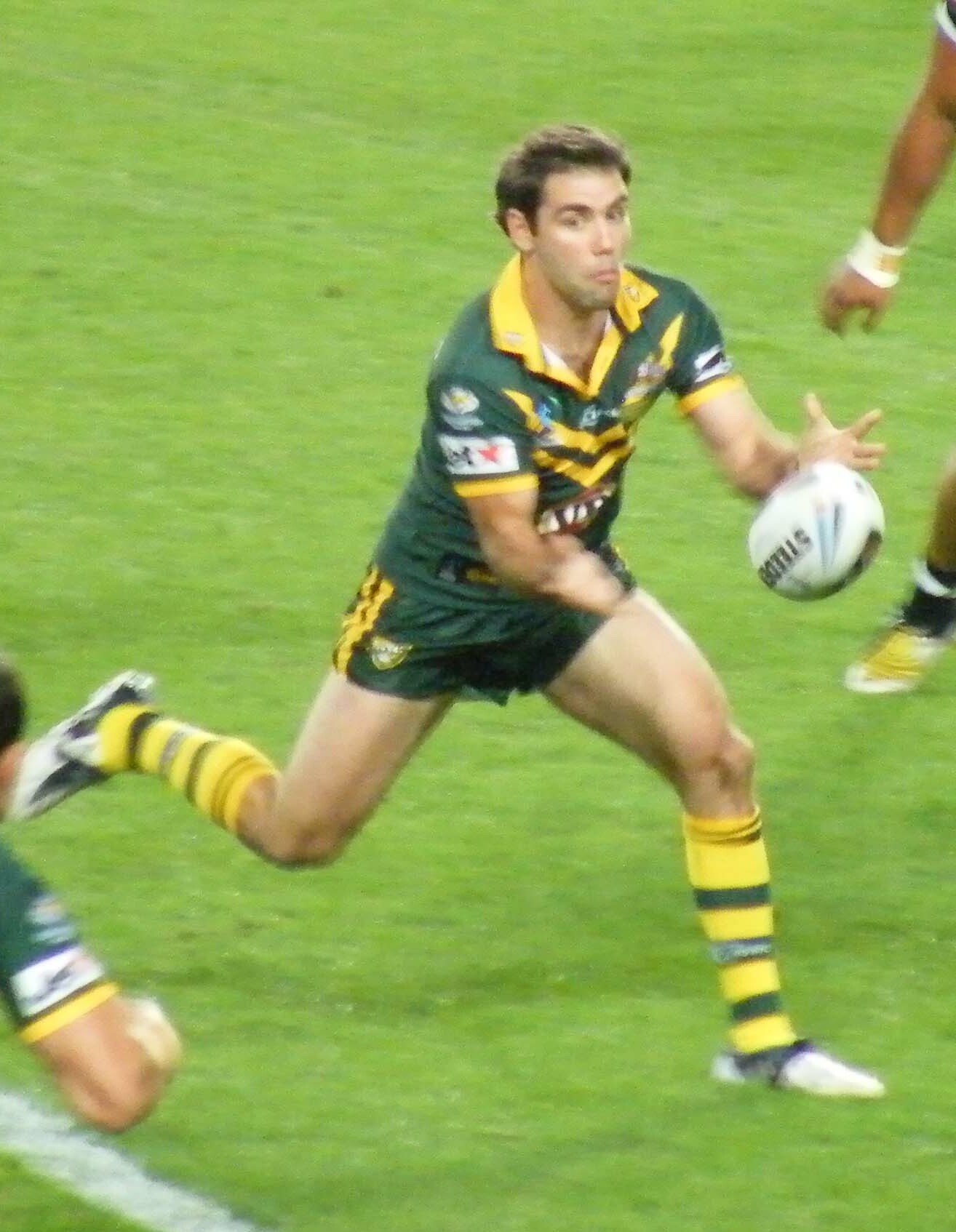
Former Melbourne Storm, Queensland and Australia hooker Cameron Smith holds the NRL records for matches played, points scored, goals kicked, tackles made, grand final points scored and competition wins.

The hooker or rake, numbered 9, (Note: Until 1989, hookers in the NSWRL and BRL were usually numbered 12.) traditionally packs in the middle of the scrum's front row. The position is named because of the traditional role of "hooking" the ball back with the foot when it enters the scrum. It is usually the hooker who plays in the dummy-half position, receiving the ball from the play-the-ball and continuing the team's attack by passing the ball to a teammate or by running with the ball. As such, hookers are required to be reliable passers and often possess a similar skill-set to half backs.

==== Prop ====
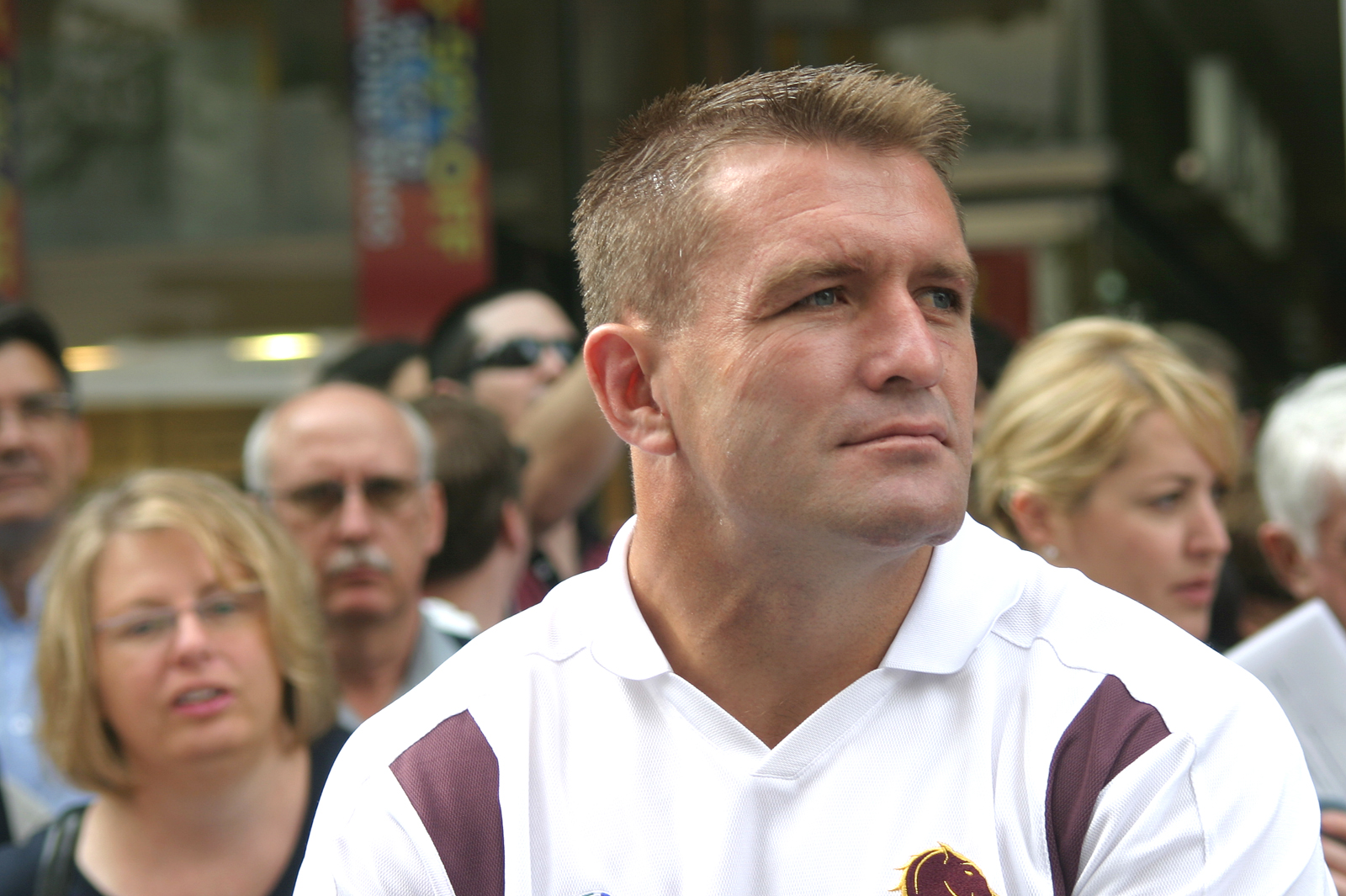
Former Brisbane Broncos prop Shane Webcke

There are two props, numbered 8 and 10, (Note: Until 1989, props in the NSWRL and BRL were usually numbered 11 and 13.) who pack into the front row of the scrum on either side of the hooker. Sometimes called "bookends" in Australasia, the props are usually the largest and heaviest players on a team. In attack, their size and strength means that they are primarily used for running directly into the defensive line, as a kind of "battering ram" to simply gain metres. Similarly, props are relied upon to defend against such running from the opposition's forwards. Prop forwards that feature in their respective nations' rugby league halls of fame are Australia's Arthur Beetson, Duncan Hall, Frank Burge and Herb Steinohrt and New Zealand's Cliff Johnson.

=== Back row ===
Three forwards make up the back row of the scrum: two second-rowers and a loose forward. All three may be referred to as back-rowers.

==== Second-row forward ====
Second-row forwards are numbered 11 and 12. (Note: Until 1989, second rowers in the NSWRL and BRL were usually numbered 9 and 10.) While their responsibilities are similar in many ways to the props, these players typically possess more speed and agility and take up a wider position in attack and defence. Often each second rower will cover a specific side of the field, working in unison with their respective centre and winger. Second rowers are often relied upon to perform large numbers of tackles in defence. Second-row forwards that feature in their nations' halls of fame include New Zealand's Mark Graham, Australia's Norm Provan, George Treweek and Harry Bath, France's Jean Galia, and Great Britain & England's Martin Hodgson.

==== Loose forward / lock forward ====
Numbered 13, (Note: Until 1989, locks in the NSWRL and BRL were usually numbered 8.) the loose forward or lock forward packs behind the two-second-rows in the scrum. Some teams choose to simply deploy a third prop in the loose forward position, while other teams use a more skilful player as an additional playmaker. Loose forwards that feature in their nation's Halls of Fame include Australia's Ron Coote, Johnny Raper, Bradley Clyde and Wally Prigg, Great Britain's Vince Karalius, Ellery Hanley and 'Rocky' Turner, and New Zealand's Charlie Seeling.

== Interchange ==
In addition to the thirteen on-field players, there are a maximum of five or six interchange players who start the game on their team's bench.

The use of substitutes in Test matches was officially approved by the International Rugby League Board in 1963. Prior to this most games were played with no changes permitted at all, although some domestic leagues allowed injured players to be replaced.

The rules governing if and when a replacement can be used have varied over the history of the game; currently they can be used for any reason by their coach – typically because of injury, to manage fatigue, for tactical reasons or due to poor performance. Under current rules, players who have been substituted are typically allowed to be substituted back into the game later on. Leagues in different countries have had different rules on how many interchanges can be made in a game. The Super League allowed up to ten interchanges per team in each game; this was reduced to eight interchanges per team per game, commencing in the 2019 season. Commencing in the 2016 season, Australia's National Rugby League permits up to eight interchanges per team per game. Additionally, if a player is injured due to foul play and an opposition player has been sin-binned or sent off then the injured player's team is given a free interchange.

In 2026 the National Rugby League changed the interchange rules. Six players start in the interchange squad and any four can be used as replacements. Once four of the six have entered play, the other two become unused reserves unless one is used as a concussion substitute. The predeclared interchange of five (four interchanges and a concussion substitute) remains standard in the RFL

=== Concussion substitute ===
Commencing in 2021, a player named as the squad's 18th player on match day is able to take the field when three players fail a head injury assessment; or when a player suffers a match-ending injury caused by foul play, in which the opposing player was either sin-binned or sent off. Since the change, there have been calls to reduce the number of players that suffer a match-ending injury to two players, in the wake of a few incidents in the NRL.

The concussion substitute was used during the 2021 Rugby League World Cup played in 2022, and adopted by the RFL in 2023.

== Roles ==
As well as their positions, players' roles may be referred to by a range of other terms.

=== Marker ===
Following a tackle, the defending team may position two players – known as markers – at the play-the-ball to stand, one behind the other facing the tackled player and the attacking team's dummy-half.

=== Dummy half ===
The dummy half or (acting half-back) is the player who stands behind the play-the-ball and collects the ball, before passing, running or kicking the ball. The hooker has become almost synonymous with the dummy half role. However, any player of any position can play the role at any time and this often happens during a game, particularly when the hooker is the player tackled.

=== First receiver ===
The first receiver is the name given to the first player to receive the ball off the play-the-ball, i.e. from the dummy-half.

=== Second receiver ===
If the ball is passed immediately by the first receiver, then the player catching it is sometimes referred to as the second receiver.

=== Utility ===
A player who can play in a number of different positions is often referred to as a "utility player", "utility forward", or "utility back".

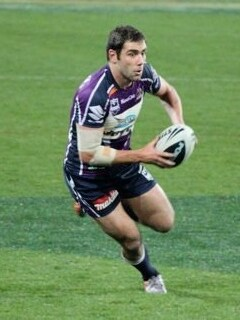
Cameron Smith, former captain of Australia and Queensland and the Melbourne Storm.

=== Goal-kicker ===
Although any player can attempt their team's kicks at goal (penalty kicks or conversions), most teams have specific players who train extensively at kicking, and often use only one player to take goal kicks during a game.

=== Captain ===
The captain is the on-field leader of a team and a point of contact between the referee and a team, and can be a player of any position. Some of the captain's responsibilities are stipulated in the laws.

Before a match, the two teams' captains toss a coin with the referee. The captain that wins the toss can decide to kick off or can choose which end of the field to defend. The captain that loses the toss then takes the other of the alternatives.

The captain is often seen as responsible for a team's discipline. When a team persistently breaks the laws, the referee while issuing a caution will often speak with the team's captain to encourage them to improve their team's discipline.

The captains are also traditionally responsible for appointing a substitute should a player suffer an injury during a game, although in the professional game there are other procedures in place for dealing with this.

== See also ==
- Rugby league gameplay
