= 1952–53 Kangaroo tour of Great Britain and France =

Rugby league tour (1952–1953)

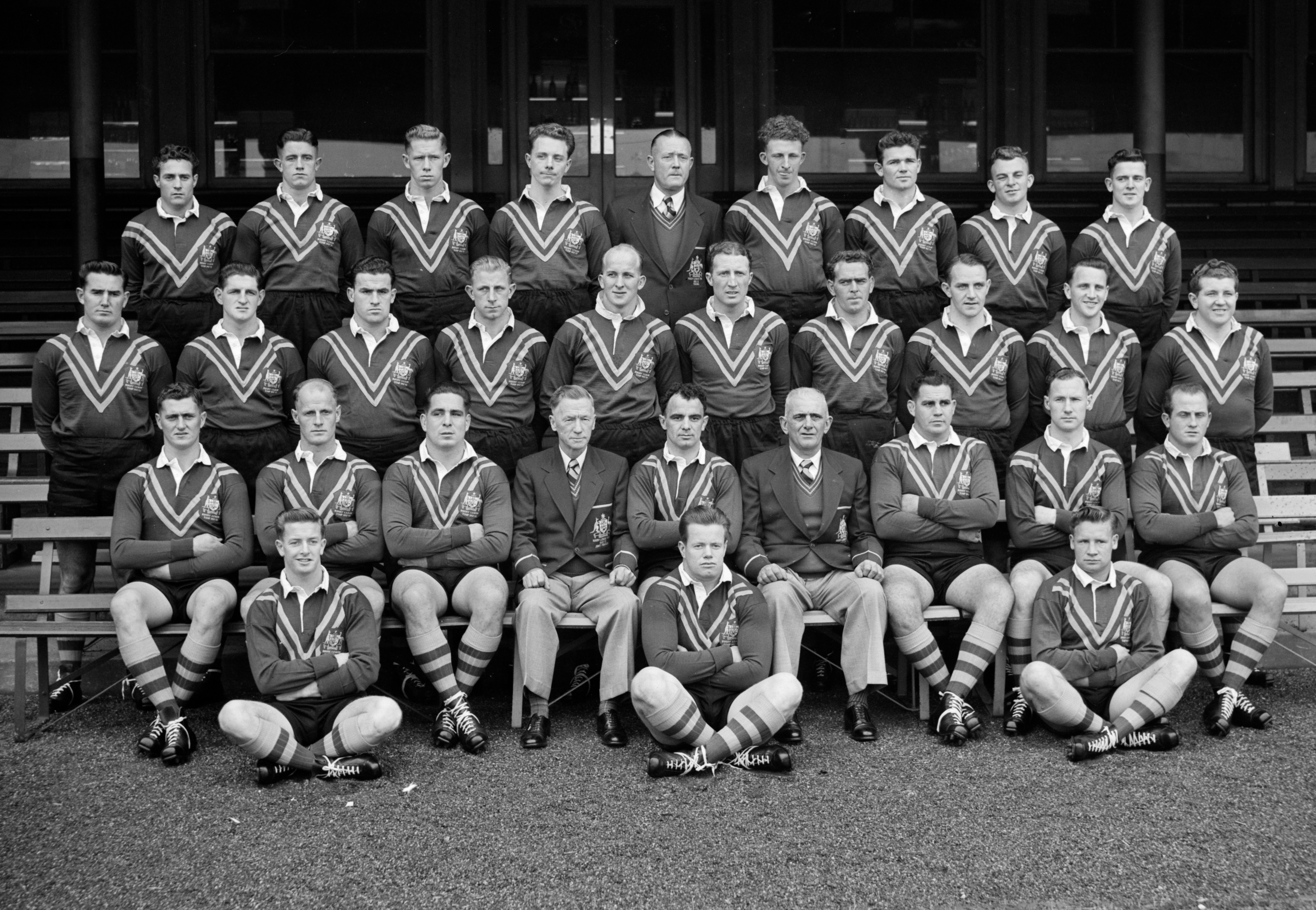
- Australian Kangaroos, 1952
- Manager: Norm Robinson; Doug MacLean
- Tour captain(s): Clive Churchill
- Top point scorer(s): Noel Pidding 228
- Top try scorer(s): Brian Carlson 29
- Top test point scorer(s): Noel Pidding 25
- Top test try scorer(s): Tommy Ryan 4
Summary
P	W	D	L
Total
40	33	1	6
Test match
6	2	0	4
Opponent
P	W	D	L
Great Britain
3	1	0	2
France
3	1	0	2

Tour chronology
- Previous tour: 1948-49
- Next tour: 1956-57

The 1952–53 Kangaroo tour was the eighth Kangaroo tour, in which the Australian national rugby league team travelled to Great Britain and France and played forty matches, including the Ashes series of three Test matches against Great Britain and three Test matches against the French. It followed the tour of 1948-49 and the next was staged in 1956-57.

== The squad's leadership ==
The team was captained by Clive Churchill with Frank Stanmore as vice-captain. Tour co-managers were Doug MacLean and Norm Robinson. In the matches in which neither Churchill nor Stanmore played, the Kangaroos were captained by Duncan Hall on 4 occasions (Wigan, Swinton, Dewsbury, and Selection de Midi) and Albert Paul on 3 occasions (French Selection, French Selection, Paris-Lyon). Three players captained the team in one match: Keith Holman (Doncaster), Ferris Ashton (Wakefield Trinity) and Noel Hazzard (French Selection).

== Touring squad ==
The Rugby League News published a photo and details of the touring team including the players' ages, weights, heights, and occupations. Match details - listing surnames of both teams and the point scorers - were included in E.E. Christensen's Official Rugby League Yearbook, as was a summary of the players' point-scoring.
Crocker, Davies, Flannery, Hall, Hazzard, McCaffery, McGovern, and Rooney were selected from Queensland clubs. Carlson, Duncan, Gill, Paul, and Wells were selected from clubs in New South Wales Country areas. The balance of the squad had played for Sydney-based clubs during the 1952 season.

Player	Position	Age	Weight	Club	Tests on Tour	Games	Tries	Goals	FG	Points
Ferris Ashton	Second-row	26	14.7 (92)	Eastern Suburbs	5	22	9	0	0	27
Roy Bull	Prop	23	14.1 (89)	Manly-Warringah	4	17	2	0	0	6
Brian Carlson	Wing	19	12.9 (80)	Newcastle Northern Suburbs	3	19	29	3	0	93
Clive Churchill	Fullback	26	11.10 (74)	South Sydney	6	23	4	17	0	46
Arthur Collinson	Second-row	22	14.4 (91)	Western Suburbs	3	20	9	0	0	27
Harold Crocker	Lock	25	15.0 (95)	South Brisbane	2	17	3	0	0	9
Brian Davies	Second-row	22	15.0 (95)	Brisbane Brothers	6	24	8	0	0	24
Col Donohoe	Halfback	23	11.2 (71)	Eastern Suburbs	1	16	4	0	0	12
Rees Duncan	Centre	20	13.3 (84)	Kurri Kurri	0	18	9	0	0	27
Denis Flannery	Wing	23	13.0 (83)	Ipswich Brothers	1	14	23	0	0	69
Col Geelan	Five-eighth	25	12.7 (79)	Newtown	4	20	10	0	0	30
Charlie Gill	Prop	29	13.9 (87)	Newcastle Northern Suburbs	1	20	4	0	0	12
Duncan Hall	Prop	27	14.7 (92)	Toowoomba Newtown	6	25	7	0	0	21
Greg Hawick	Utility Back	20	13.0 (83)	South Sydney	2	16	8	0	0	24
Noel Hazzard	Centre	27	13.7 (86)	Bundaberg Natives	6	23	6	0	0	18
Keith Holman	Halfback	27	11.9 (74)	Western Suburbs	5	16	10	8	0	46
Ken Kearney	Hooker	28	13.3 (84)	St George	4	20	1	0	0	3
Ken McCaffery	Utility Back	22	12.5 (78)	Toowoomba Souths	0	12	9	0	0	27
Des McGovern	Wing	24	13.2 (83)	Toowoomba All Whites	0	10	17	0	0	51
Albert Paul	Lock	24	14.0 (89)	Lakes United	1	21	9	4	0	35
Noel Pidding	Wing	25	12.4 (78)	St George	4	22	18	87	0	228
Jack Rooney	Prop	25	15.11 (100)	Toowoomba All Whites	0	17	5	0	0	15
Tommy Ryan	Centre	22	13.9 (87)	St George	4	20	24	0	0	72
Kevin Schubert	Hooker	25	15.11 (100)	Manly-Warringah	2	19	1	0	0	3
Frank Stanmore	Five-eighth	23	12.4 (78)	Western Suburbs	5	21	4	0	0	12
Tom Tyrrell	Second-row	25	13.8 (86)	Balmain	1	17	8	0	0	24
Harry Wells	Centre	20	13.10 (87)	Wollongong	2	14	5	0	0	15
Ron Willey	Fullback	24	12.0 (76)	Canterbury	0	17	5	63	0	141

=== Test Venues ===
The three Ashes series tests took place at the following venues.

Leeds	Swinton	Bradford
Headingley	Station Road	Odsal Stadium
Capacity: 40,000	Capacity: 60,000	Capacity: 60,000

== Match Results ==
The touring party departed the eastern states before the conclusion of the Sydney, Brisbane and various regional competitions. On July 27, 1952, they played a match against Western Australia in Perth, winning 88—3. Travelling aboard the RMS Strathnaver, the team arrived in England on August 24, 1952. Australia played 27 matches in England before moving in mid-December to France for a further 13 matches.

September 6	Keighley	4–54	Australia	Cougar Park, Keighley
3.00pm	Tries: nil Goals: 2 Lockwood; Prescott	[ Report]	Tries: 12; Albert Paul (3); Brian Davies (2); Tommy Ryan (2); Ferris Ashton (2); Brian Carlson; Clive Churchill; Noel Pidding; Goals: 9 Noel Pidding (9)	Attendance: 7,431; Gate: £ 983; Referee: T. Armitage

September 8	Hull	0–28	Australia	The Boulevard, Hull
6.15pm	Tries: nil Goals: nil	[ Report]	Tries: 6 Tom Tyrrell (2); Arthur Collinson; Duncan Hall; Denis Flannery; Noel Pidding; Goals: 5 Noel Pidding (5)	Attendance: 15,364; Gate: £ 2,204; Referee: M. Coates

September 11	Barrow	2–26	Australia	Craven Park, Barrow
5.45pm	Tries: nil Goals: 1 Stretch	[ Report]	Tries: 6 Noel Pidding (3); Albert Paul; Noel Hazzard; Brian Carlson; Goals: 4 Noel Pidding (4)	Attendance: 16,045; Gate: £ 1,932; Referee: G. Dobson

September 13	Whitehaven	5–15	Australia	Recreation Ground, Whitehaven
3.00pm	Tries: 1 Keen; Goals: 1 Fearon	[ Report]	Tries: 3 Brian Davies; Denis Flannery; Keith Holman; Goals: 3 Ron Willey (3)	Attendance: 9,253; Gate: £ 1,153; Referee: C.F. Appleton

September 15	Oldham	7–7	Australia	Watersheddings, Oldham
6.00pm	Tries: 1 Watson; Goals: 2 Ganley (2)	[ Report]	Tries: 1 Ken McCaffery; Goals: 2 Noel Pidding (2)	Attendance: 19,370; Gate: £ 2,856; Referee: F. Smith

September 20	Halifax	7–39	Australia	Thrum Hall, Halifax
3.00pm	Tries: 1 Cook; Goals: 2 Clarkson (2)	[ Report]	Tries: 7 Noel Pidding; Noel Hazzard; Rees Duncan; Brian Carlson; Col Donohoe; Tom Tyrrell; Arthur Collinson; Goals: 9 Noel Pidding (9)	Attendance: 18,773; Gate: £ 2,512; Referee: L.J. Dalby

September 24	Wigan	13–23	Australia	Central Park, Wigan
5.45pm	Tries: 3 Bevan (2); Street; Goals: 2 Cheetham (2)	[ Report]	Tries: 5 Brian Carlson (2); Harry Wells (2); Albert Paul; Goals: 4 Ron Willey (4)	Attendance: 16,223; Gate: £ 2,075; Referee: J.W. Jackson

September 27	St Helens	26–8	Australia	Knowsley Road, St Helens
3.00pm	Tries: 4 McCormick (2); Greenhall; Langfield; Goals: 7 Langfield (7)	[ Report]	Tries: 2 Denis Flannery; Arthur Collinson; Goals: 1 Noel Pidding	Attendance: 17,205; Gate: £ 2,348; Referee: G. Phillips

October 1	Featherstone Rovers	15–50	Australia	Post Office Road, Featherstone
5.30pm	Tries: 3 Tennant (2); Blackburn; Goals: 3 Davies (3)	[ Report]	Tries: 12; Des McGovern (6); Denis Flannery (3); Col Geelan; Tommy Ryan; Ken McCaffery; Goals: 7 Ron Willey (7)	Attendance: 3,700; Gate: £ 565; Referee: A. Hill

=== 1st Test ===
October 4
3.00pm

Great Britain	19–6	Australia
Tries: 3 Frank Castle; Ron Ryder; Arthur Daniels; Goals: 5 Willie Horne (5)		Tries: nil Goals: 3 Noel Pidding (3)

Headingley, Leeds
Attendance: 34,505
Gate: £ 8,628
Referee: G. Phillips

Great Britain	Position	Australia
Jack Evans	FB	Clive Churchill (c)
Arthur Daniels	WG	Noel Pidding
Ron Ryder	CE	Noel Hazzard
Ernest Ward	CE	Harry Wells
Frank Castle	WG	Brian Carlson
Willie Horne (c)	SO	Greg Hawick
Ted Toohey	SH	Keith Holman
Alan Prescott	PR	Duncan Hall
Alvin Ackerley	HK	Kevin Schubert
Jim Featherstone	PR	Brian Davies
Charlie Pawsey	SR	Ferris Ashton
Bob Ryan	SR	Albert Paul
Ken Traill	LF	Harold Crocker

October 8	Bradford Northern	6–20	Australia	Odsal Stadium, Bradford
7.00pm	Tries: nil Goals: 3 Phillips (3)	[ Report]	Tries: 4 Brian Carlson; Tommy Ryan; Tom Tyrrell; Arthur Collinson; Goals: 4 Ron Willey (4)	Attendance: 29,287; Gate: £ 3,859; Referee: L. Thorpe

October 11	Warrington	10–34	Australia	Wilderspool Stadium, Warrington
3.00pm	Tries: 2 Livesey; Bevan; Goals: 2 Mountford (2)	[ Report]	Tries: 8 Noel Pidding (2); Ferris Ashton (2); Rees Duncan; Jack Rooney; Roy Bull; Ken McCaffery; Goals: 5 Noel Pidding (3); Ron Willey (2)	Attendance: 21,478; Gate: £ 2,922; Referee: S. Abram

October 15	Leigh	5–34	Australia	Kirkhall Lane, Leigh
4.45pm	Tries: 1 Kitchen; Goals: 1 Breare	[ Report]	Tries: 8 Brian Carlson (4); Col Geelan (2); Keith Holman; Arthur Collinson; Goals: 5 Albert Paul (4); Brian Carlson	Attendance: 8,409; Gate: £ 1,016; Referee: N.T. Railton

October 18	Swinton	8–31	Australia	Station Road, Swinton
3.00pm	Tries: 2 Moran (2); Goals: 1 Blan	[ Report]	Tries: 7 Rees Duncan (2); Col Donohoe (2); Noel Pidding; Noel Hazzard; Ken Kearney; Goals: 5 Noel Pidding (5)	Attendance: 10,269; Gate: £ 1,285; Referee: W. Stockley

October 22	Hunslet	2–49	Australia	Parkside, Hunslet
3.00pm	Tries: nil Goals: 1 Talbot	[ Report]	Tries: 11; Brian Carlson (4); Tommy Ryan (2); Clive Churchill; Col Geelan; Keith Holman; Tom Tyrrell; Arthur Collinson; Goals: 8 Clive Churchill (8)	Attendance: 3,273; Gate: £ 443; Referee: R. Gelder

October 25	Workington Town	15–27	Australia	Borough Park, Workington
3.00pm	Tries: 3 Paskins; Gibson; Mudge; Goals: 3 Cavanagh	[ Report]	Tries: 5 Noel Pidding; Col Donohoe; Albert Paul; Ferris Ashton; Arthur Collinson; Goals: 6 Noel Pidding (6)	Attendance: 11,341; Gate: £ 1,444; Referee: H. Squires

October 30	Doncaster	13–41	Australia	Bentley Road Stadium, Doncaster
3.15pm	Tries: 1 Lane; Goals: 5 Griffiths	[ Report]	Tries: 9 Denis Flannery (3); Tommy Ryan (2); Brian Davies; Keith Holman; Greg Hawick; Ken McCaffery; Goals: 7 Ron Willey (7)	Attendance: 2,452; Gate: £ 326; Referee: A.S. Dobson

November 1	Huddersfield	9–27	Australia	Fartown Ground, Huddersfield
3.00pm	Tries: 1 Rylance; Goals: 3 Devery (3)	[ Report]	Tries: 5 Arthur Collinson; Brian Davies; Brian Carlson; Noel Hazzard; Denis Flannery; Goals: 6 Clive Churchill (6)	Attendance: 25,494; Gate: £ 3,448; Referee: S. Adams

=== 2nd Test ===
November 9
3.00pm

Great Britain	21–5	Australia
Tries: 5 Frank Castle (2); Doug Greenall (2); Ernest Ward; Goals: 3 Ernest Ward (2); Willie Horne		Tries: 1 Col Geelan; Goals: 1 Brian Carlson

Station Road, Swinton
Attendance: 32,421
Gate: £ 6,776
Referee: J. Jackson

Great Britain	Position	Australia
Jack Evans	FB	Clive Churchill (c)
Arthur Daniels	WG	Denis Flannery
Ernest Ward	CE	Noel Hazzard
Doug Greenall	CE	Col Geelan
Frank Castle	WG	Brian Carlson
Willie Horne (c)	SO	Frank Stanmore
Ted Toohey	SH	Col Donohoe
Alan Prescott	PR	Duncan Hall
Tom McKinney	HK	Kevin Schubert
Jim Featherstone	PR	Charlie Gill
Charlie Pawsey	SR	Brian Davies
Dave Valentine	SR	Tom Tyrrell
Ken Traill	LF	Arthur Collinson

November 12	Wakefield Trinity	8–58	Australia	Belle Vue, Wakefield
3.00pm	Tries: 2 Evans (2); Goals: 1 Burton	[ Report]	Tries: 12; Noel Pidding (3); Ken McCaffery (2); Ron Willey; Des McGovern; Rees Duncan; Tommy Ryan; Harold Crocker; Ferris Ashton; Greg Hawick; Goals: 11; Noel Pidding (11)	Attendance: 7,239; Gate: £ 819; Referee: A. Hill

November 15	Hull Kingston Rovers	6–31	Australia	Craven Park, Hull
2.30pm	Tries: nil Goals: 3 Dockar (3)	[ Report]	Tries: 5 Denis Flannery (3); Col Geelan; Tom Tyrrell; Goals: 8 Keith Holman (7); Clive Churchill	Attendance: 5,817; Gate: £ 904; Referee: H. Harrison

November 19	Lancashire	11–36	Australia	Wilderspool Stadium, Warrington
2.30pm	Tries: 3 Pawsey; Horne; McCormick; Goals: 1 Schofield	[ Report]	Tries: 8 Rees Duncan (2); Noel Pidding; Noel Hazzard; Tommy Ryan; Brian Davies; Duncan Hall; Greg Hawick; Goals: 6 Noel Pidding (5); Clive Churchill	Attendance: 5,863; Gate: £ 840; Referee: L.J. Dalby

November 22	Leeds	4–45	Australia	Headingley, Leeds
2.30pm	Tries: nil Goals: 2 Lewis Jones (2)	[ Report]	Tries: 11; Brian Carlson (4); Ken McCaffery (2); Denis Flannery (2); Ron Willey; Frank Stanmore; Tom Tyrrell; Goals: 6 Ron Willey (6)	Attendance: 20,335; Gate: £ 2,916; Referee: A. Hill

November 26	Yorkshire	11–55	Australia	Fartown Ground, Huddersfield
2.30pm	Tries: 3 Dean; Scott; Robinson; Goals: 1 Thompson	[ Report]	Tries: 13; Noel Pidding (2); Tommy Ryan (2); Frank Stanmore (2); Keith Holman (2); Col Geelan (2); Charlie Gill; Ferris Ashton; Arthur Collinson; Goals: 8 Noel Pidding (8)	Attendance: 3,737; Gate: £ 497; Referee: N.T. Railton

December 3	Dewsbury	7–22	Australia	Crown Flatt, Dewsbury
2.30pm	Tries: 1 Lea; Goals: 2 Thompson (2)	[ Report]	Tries: 6 Des McGovern (3); Harold Crocker; Duncan Hall; Greg Hawick; Goals: 2 Ron Willey (2)	Attendance: 2,485; Gate: £ 284; Referee: A.S. Dobson

December 6	Widnes	7–18	Australia	Naughton Park, Widnes
2.30pm	Tries: 1 Wilcox; Goals: 2 Woodward (2)	[ Report]	Tries: 4 Tommy Ryan (2); Keith Holman; Rees Duncan; Goals: 3 Noel Pidding (2); Clive Churchill	Attendance: 7,411; Gate: £ 844; Referee: C.F. Appleton

=== 3rd Test ===
December 13
2.30pm

Great Britain	7–27	Australia
Tries: 1 Willie Horne; Goals: 2 Jack Evans (2)		Tries: 5 Tommy Ryan (2); Noel Pidding; Keith Holman; Brian Davies; Goals: 6 Noel Pidding (6)

Odsal Stadium, Bradford
Attendance: 30,509
Gate: £ 5,478
Referee: A.S. Dobson

Great Britain	Position	Australia
Jack Evans	FB	Clive Churchill (c)
Dai Bevan	WG	Noel Pidding
Doug Greenall	CE	Noel Hazzard
Ernest Ward	CE	Col Geelan
Frank Castle	WG	Tommy Ryan
Willie Horne (c)	SO	Frank Stanmore
Ted Toohey	SH	Keith Holman
Alan Prescott	PR	Roy Bull
Tom McKinney	HK	Ken Kearney
Jim Featherstone	PR	Duncan Hall
Charlie Pawsey	SR	Brian Davies
Dave Valentine	SR	Ferris Ashton
Ken Traill	LF	Arthur Collinson

December 18	France XIII	2–45	Australia	Stade Malakoff, Nantes
2.00pm	Tries: nil Goals: 1 Galaup	[ Report]	Tries: 11; Denis Flannery (4); Charlie Gill (3); Ron Willey; Greg Hawick; Harold Crocker; Tom Tyrrell; Goals: 6 Ron Willey (6)	Attendance: 4,320; Gate: F 1,250,000; Referee: Martung

December 21	Villeneuve	11–18	Australia	Pont-de-Marot, Villeneuve-sur-Lot
3.00pm	Tries: 3 Vigouroux; Mares; Eito; Goals: 1 Eito	[ Report]	Tries: 6 Tommy Ryan (2); Duncan Hall; Col Geelan; Keith Holman; Ferris Ashton; Goals: nil	Attendance: 2,262; Gate: F 704,800; Referee: Bonnemore

December 25	Racing Club Albi	22–31	Australia	Stade Maurice Rigaud, Albi
3.00pm	Tries: 4 Corduries; Tonus; Galaup; Carrie; Goals: 5 Rives (5)	[ Report]	Tries: 4 Denis Flannery (2); Des McGovern; Greg Hawick; Jack Rooney; Kevin Schubert; Rees Duncan; Goals: 2 Ron Willey (5)	Attendance: 4,900; Gate: F 806,000; Referee: Ribas

=== 1st Test ===
December 27
3.00pm

France	12–16	Australia
Tries: 2 Vincent Cantoni; Élie Brousse; Goals: 3 Puig Aubert (3)		Tries: 7 Tommy Ryan (2); Brian Davies; Noel Hazzard; Goals: 5 Noel Pidding (2)

Parc des Princes, Paris
Attendance: 18,327
Gate: F 5,248,500
Referee: Eddie Martung (France)

France	Position	Australia
Puig Aubert (c)	FB	Clive Churchill (c)
Vincent Cantoni	WG	Tommy Ryan
Jacky Merquey	CE	Col Geelan
André Carrère	CE	Noel Hazzard
Raymond Contrastin	WG	Noel Pidding
Gilbert Benausse	SO	Frank Stanmore
Jean Dop	SH	Keith Holman
Jean Dedieu	PR	Duncan Hall
Gabriel Genoud	HK	Ken Kearney
Louis Mazon	PR	Roy Bull
Élie Brousse	SR	Ferris Ashton
Rene Bernard	SR	Brian Davies
Christian Duple	LF	Arthur Collinson

January 1	France XIII	13–19	Australia	Stade Jean-Laffon, Perpignan
3.00pm	Tries: 3 Ponsinet; Comes; Jiminez; Goals: 2 Puig Aubert (2)	[ Report]	Tries: 5 Denis Flannery (2); Jack Rooney; Greg Hawick; Brian Carlson; Goals: 2 Ron Willey (2)	Attendance: 9,301; Gate: F 2,231,280; Referee: Planton

January 4	Carcassonne	5–18	Australia	Stade d'Albert Domec, Carcassonne
3.00pm	Tries: 1 René Benausse; Goals: 1 Puig Aubert	[ Report]	Tries: 4 Clive Churchill (2); Duncan Hall; Col Geelan; Goals: 3 Noel Pidding (3)	Attendance: 4,881; Gate: F 1,365,300; Referee: Courbieres

=== 2nd Test ===
January 11
3.00pm

France	5–0	Australia
Tries: 1 André Carrère; Goals: 1 Rives		Tries: nil Goals: nil

Parc Lescure, Bordeaux
Attendance: 23,419
Gate: F 5,060,200
Referee: Eddie Martung (France)

France	Position	Australia
G. Rives	FB	Clive Churchill (c)
Raymond Contrastin	WG	Brian Carlson
Claude Teisseire	CE	Noel Hazzard
André Carrère	CE	Harry Wells
Vincent Cantoni	WG	Tommy Ryan
Joseph Crespo	SO	Frank Stanmore
Gilbert Benausse	SH	Keith Holman
François Rinaldi	PR	Roy Bull
Gabriel Genoud	HK	Ken Kearney
Gabriel Berthomieu	PR	Duncan Hall
François Montrucolis	SR	Ferris Ashton
Édouard Ponsinet	SR	Brian Davies
Élie Brousse	LF	Greg Hawick

January 15	France XIII	7–39	Australia	Stade des Costières, Nîmes
3.00pm	Tries: 1 DeLaye; Goals: 2 Puig Aubert (2)	[ Report]	Tries: 9 Brian Carlson (4); Jack Rooney (2); Des McGovern; Greg Hawick; Harry Wells; Goals: 6 Ron Willey (6)	Attendance: 3,518; Gate: F 601,185

January 18	Provence	10–14	Australia	Stade Vélodrome, Marseille
3.00pm	Tries: 2 Blanc; Pambrun; Goals: 2 Rives (2)	[ Report]	Tries: 4 Tommy Ryan (3); Keith Holman; Goals: 1 Noel Pidding	Attendance: 11,133; Gate: F 2,591,422; Referee: Fabre

January 22	Cannes	0–62	Australia	Stade Pierre de Coubertin, Cannes
3.00pm	Tries: nil Goals: nil	[ Report]	Tries: 16; Brian Carlson (5); Des McGovern (5); Ron Willey; Harry Wells; Frank Stanmore; Ferris Ashton; Duncan Hall; Ken McCaffery; Goals: 7 Ron Willey (6); Brian Carlson	Attendance: 0,780; Gate: F 156,200

=== 3rd Test ===
January 25
3.00pm

France	13–5	Australia
Tries: 1 Gilbert Benausse; Goals: 5 Puig Aubert (5)		Tries: 1 Duncan Hall; Goals: 1 Keith Holman

Stade de Gerland, Lyon
Attendance: 17,454
Gate: F 6,512,500
Referee: P. Ribas

France	Position	Australia
Puig Aubert (c)	FB	Clive Churchill (c)
Raymond Contrastin	WG	Noel Pidding
Claude Teisseire	CE	Noel Hazzard
André Carrère	CE	Col Geelan
Vincent Cantoni	WG	Tommy Ryan
Gilbert Benausse	SO	Frank Stanmore
Joseph Crespo	SH	Keith Holman
Louis Mazon	PR	Roy Bull
Gabriel Genoud	HK	Ken Kearney
François Rinaldi	PR	Duncan Hall
Élie Brousse	SR	Brian Davies
Édouard Ponsinet	SR	Ferris Ashton
François Montrucolis	LF	Harold Crocker

January 28	Paris/Lyon XIII	12–10	Australia	Parc de Sports, Roanne
	Tries: 2 Crespo (2); Goals: 3 Puig Aubert (3)	[ Report]	Tries: 2 Albert Paul; Ron Willey; Goals: 2 Noel Pidding (2)	Attendance: 5,532; Gate: F 915,800; Referee: Vacher

February 1	Selection du Midi	13–24	Australia	Stade de Toulouse, Toulouse
3.00pm	Tries: 3 Marty; Berthomieu; Rinaldi; Goals: 2 Poletti (2)	[ Report]	Tries: 6 Albert Paul (2); Noel Pidding; Harry Wells; Tommy Ryan; Roy Bull; Goals: 3 Ron Willey (3)	Attendance: 7,107; Gate: F 1,578,800; Referee: Huc

The tourists returned from France to London to meet the RMS Mooltan, departing England on the evening of February 2, 1953. The ship arrived in Fremantle on March 6 and to Sydney on March 17. The players were welcomed home by local League authorities.
A team selected from the touring Kangaroos played a match against The Rest of Australia on April 15, 1953. The Kangaroos won 33-21.

== Sources ==
Acronym	Item	Years	Database App	Notes
Direct Online Access
RLN	Rugby League News	1920-1973	Trove	Team Lists, Team Photos, Articles
RLP	Rugby League Project	1907–present	RLP Website	Test Match teams & scorers.
CM	The Courier-Mail	1933-1954	Trove	Match Reports, Articles by Eddie Waring as well as the AAP.
Truth	Truth	1894-1954	Trove	Match Reports, Articles by Harry Sunderland as well as the AAP.
—	Various Australian newspapers	1952-1953	Trove	Match Reports written by the Australian Associated Press and amended by local editors. The Brisbane Telegraph, Cairns Post and Maryborough Chronicle typically published longer versions of the AAP articles.
WARL	History of Western Australian Rugby League	1947–Present	Website	Images of the programme, Western Australia v Australia, including team photo and pen profiles of the tourists.
Offline Resources
EECYB	E.E. Christensen's Official Rugby League Year Book	1946-1978	Copies at State Library of NSW	Teams, Point Scorers, Report. 1953 Yearbook covers the 1952-53 tour.
-	Ipswich Rugby League - The Bulimba Cup Era 1925 to 1972	1925-1972	Copies at SLQ & NLA	Given Names & Club of Brisbane, Ipswich & Toowoomba Players
