= 1953 American All Stars tour of Australia and New Zealand =

1953 rugby league tour

- Manager: Mike Dimitro
- Coach(es): Norm (Latchem) Robinson in Australia; Frank Mulcare & Travers Hardwick in New Zealand
- Tour captain(s): Various
- Top point scorer(s): Gary Kerkorian 173
- Top try scorer(s): Alvin E. Kirkland 14
Summary
P	W	D	L
Total
26	6	2	18

Tour chronology
- Previous tour: None
- Next tour: 1953-54 American All Stars rugby league tour of France

The 1953 American All Stars rugby league tour of Australia and New Zealand was a tour by a group of twenty men who had not previously played the sport of Rugby League. Most of the team were current or former College Gridiron footballers with Stanford University, the University of California, Los Angeles, or the University of Southern California. Some of the party had played rugby union at their colleges, during gridiron off-seasons.

== Summary ==
The tour was instigated by player-manager Mike Dimitro, who claimed to have witnessed a game of rugby league in Sydney whilst serving in the Pacific during World War II. Dimitro had played for UCLA and was a high school teacher in Los Angeles in the lead up to the tour. Dimitro wrote to the Australian Rugby League Board of Control in February 1952. Several of the League's administrators were fervent promoters of their sport, and some were keen to take the game to the United States, so Dimitro's suggestion was favourably received. Another factor was the success of France's inaugural tour in 1951. Harold Matthews responded on behalf of the board in April 1952.

Apprised of the proposed tour, the New Zealand Rugby League were also interested, and their Secretary, J.E. Knowling, was able to meet with Mike Dimitro in Los Angeles.

Although arrangements in California did not run smoothly, with reassurances sought by the host nation boards, eighteen players arrived in Sydney on May 18, 1953. A further two players arrived on June 1.

The appointed coach, Norm “Latchem” Robinson, had less than a fortnight to educate the players. A touch-football game against South Sydney and a tackle match against a team of Army Engineers were used in preparations.

Remarkably, the American All Stars won their first match on the scheduled tour, beating a combined Monaro and Southern Districts side. The next two scheduled fixtures were against Sydney and New South Wales, and the Americans were understandably outclassed. The wisdom of setting novices against experienced semi-professionals so early in the tour was questioned at the time. The matches did, however, attract large crowds 65,453 on a Saturday against Sydney, and 32,554 on a Tuesday against New South Wales. There was consensus in the press that the host teams did take it easy on the visitors.

The tour progressed with matches in regional and country New South Wales, and then into Queensland. The Australian board had recommended that 28 players would be necessary given the two matches per week schedule, and injuries had an impact on the twenty-man squad. This led to the informal use of “ring-ins” in matches at Ipswich and Wagga, and formally in a return match against New South Wales on July 25, and throughout the New Zealand leg.

Through the tour the American players were commended for their excellent ball handling and robust tackling. The running ability of many, particularly the backs was praised. Referees showed leniency to a lack of understanding of offside rules in early matches. A slowness in comprehending and implementing cover defence was a common concern in reports on later matches.

A curiosity to local spectators and the press at the time was the All Stars' practice of warming up on the field with calisthenics, or “physical jerks”. Although this innovation did not immediately catch on, National Rugby League teams have utilised on field warm-ups since the 1990s.

A highlight for spectators was the American's use of the pitch-pass, with exhibitions given prior to most matches. In play, league rules against forward passing meant the pitch was restricted to lateral or backwards movement. Although a few pitch passes did lead to an All Stars try, usually the arc allowed defenders time to immediately tackle the receiver, or intercept.

A sad development of the tour was that Jack Bonetti contracted Polio. This was diagnosed after he entered hospital in Townsville, having exhibited pain after the match in Cairns.

== Touring squad ==
Player	Pos.	Age	Weight	Height	College(s)	Games in Aus	Games in NZ	Tries	Goals	Field Goals	Points
Al Abajian	Five-eighth	25	13.3 (84)	5.8	USC	15		8	0	0	24
Bill Albans	Wing	25	13.8 (86)	6.4	North Carolina	13	0	5	0	0	15
Jack Bonetti	Second-row	22	15.1 (96)	6.1	Stanford	9	0	7	0	0	21
Bob Buckley	Centre	20	13.8 (86)	5.1	USC	12	0	4	0	0	12
Ed Demirjian	Wing	22	13.3 (84)	5.1	USC	6		2	0	0	6
Mike Dimitro	Second-row	28	15.1 (96)	5.1	UCLA USC	11		3	0	0	9
Steve Drakulvich	Prop	28	15.13 (101)	6.3	UCLA	9		1	0	0	3
Ted Grossman	Halfback	23	12.7 (79)	5.1	Pacific	16		7	0	0	21
Harold Han	Centre	20	13.8 (86)	5.9	USC	12	0	7	0	0	21
Pat Henry	Second-row	24	14.9 (93)	5.11	Stanford	11		1	0	0	3
Vince Jones	Prop	23	14.9 (93)	5.11	Dartmouth Stanford	16		3	0	0	9
George Kauffman	Fullback	26	14.0 (89)	6	UCLA	14		1	7	2	21
Gary Kerkorian	Wing	23	13.3 (84)	6	Stanford	17	0	5	79	0	173
Al D. Kirkland	Lock	23	15.5 (98)	6.3	USC Stanford	16		12	1	0	38
Alvin E. Kirkland	Centre	22	13.3 (84)	5.1	USC Stanford	16		14	0	0	42
Fran Mandulay	Second-row	24	15.0 (95)	6	Nebraska UCLA	15		1	0	0	3
Xavier Mena	Prop	24	16.1 (102)	6.1	UCLA	6		2	0	0	6
Sol Naumu	Five-eighth	23	14.0 (89)	5.11	UCLA USC	14		1	8	0	19
Ray Terry	Prop	29	16.3 (103)	6.2	Alabama	1		0	0	0	0
Sydney Walker	Hooker	21	15.0 (95)	5.8	UCLA	10		1	0	0	3

Note: The tally of games in Australia, tries and goals collated from newspaper articles, as referenced below. In a few instances newspaper accounts differ. Some match reports do not mention all participants. A concession was made to allow the Americans to use substitutes in the event of first half injuries. This was unusual for the time. Normally no replacements were permitted.

Four Queenslanders — Harold Crocker, Brian Davies, Alan Hornery and Ken McCaffery — played for the American All Stars in the July 25 match against New South Wales.

Five of the tourists returned to the United States at the conclusion of the Australian leg. By arrangement with the New Zealand Rugby League, they were replaced by four, later five, New Zealanders: Travers Hardwick and Frank Mulcare who took on coaching duties, and also Des Barchard, Roy Moore and Roy Roff.

== Australian leg ==
May 27	Monaro-Southern Division	25–34	America	Manuka Oval, Canberra
3pm	Tries: 5 Roy Freebody (2); Bill Beazley; Greg Watts; Ron Bercene; Goals: 5 Bill Beazley (5)	[Teams; Report; Report Report]	Tries: 8 Alvin Kirkland (4); Al D. Kirkland (2); Al Abajian; Jack Bonetti; Goals: 5 Gary Kerkorian (5)	Attendance: 4,877; Gate: AU£ 965; Referee: Jack O'Brien

Team list:

Monaco-Southern Division FB: Bill Beazley ( Wollongong), WG: Greg Watts (Pyree), CE: Roy Freebody ( Captain's Flat), CE: Jack Seamer ( Port Kembla), WG: P. Ryan ( Bombala), FE: Keith Sullivan ( Goulburn), HB: Ron Bercene ( Bombala), LK: Bob Smith ( Port Kembla), SR: Angus Miller ( Berry), SR: Col Yarham ( Mittagong), PR: Billy Hodges ( Captain's Flat), HK: R. Stewart (Bega), PR: Bruce Edwards ( Robertson).
J. Southwell ( Canberra) played. He may have replaced Yarham prior to kick-off. Col Williamson ( Goulburn) was named as a reserve, but likely did not play as he was not mentioned in match reports.
The following were initially selected but did not play: Robert Bartlett ( Wollongong), Jack Plater ( Yass) and Harry Wells ( Wollongong).
American All Stars: FB: George Kauffman, WG: Bill Albans, CE: Ed Demirjian, CE: Gary Kerkorian, WG: Alvin E. Kirkland, FE: Sol Naumu, HB: Ted Grossman, LK: Pat Henry, SR: Vince Jones, SR: Al D. Kirkland, SR: Fran Mandulay, HK: Sydney Walker, LK: Jack Bonetti. Al Abajian replaced Bill Albans.

May 30	Sydney	52–25	America	Sydney Cricket Ground
3pm	Tries: 10; Noel Pidding (4); Ken Kearney (2); Keith Holman; Ron Taylor; Ben Haslam; Lloyd Hudson; Goals: 11; Noel Pidding (11)	[Program; Report; Report Report]	Tries: 3 Sydney Walker; Alvin Kirkland; Sol Naumu; Goals: 8 Gary Kerkorian (8)	Attendance: 65,453; Gate: AU£ 8,744; Referee: Jack O'Brien

Team list:

Sydney: FB: Clive Churchill (26) ( Souths), WG: Noel Pidding (26) ( St George), CE: George Martin (20) ( Norths), CE: Ron Taylor (21) ( Easts), WG: Barry Stenhouse (19) ( Canterbury), FE: Bob Sullivan (22) ( Norths), HB: Keith Holman (25) ( Wests), LK: Les Cowie (28) ( Souths), SR: Arthur Collinson (23) ( Wests), SR: Ben Haslam (24) ( Norths), PR: Roy Bull (23) ( Manly), HK: Ken Kearney (27) ( St George), PR: Lloyd Hudson (25) ( Norths).
The following were selected as reserves but did not play: Ken Slattery (20) ( Parramatta) and Johnny Slade (25) ( Parramatta).
American All Stars: FB: George Kauffman, WG: Bill Albans, CE: Alvin E. Kirkland, CE: Sol Naumu, WG: Ed Demirjian, FE: Gary Kerkorian, HB: Ted Grossman, LK: Jack Bonetti, SR: Al D. Kirkland, SR: Fran Mandulay, PR: Vince Jones, HK: Sydney Walker, PR: Pat Henry.

June 2	New South Wales	62–41	America	Sydney Cricket Ground
2.30pm	Tries: 14; Tommy Ryan (6); Noel Pidding (2); Ken Kearney (2); Don Schofield; Harry Wells; Keith Holman; Ken Slattery; Goals: 10; Noel Pidding (10)	[Program; Report Report]	Tries: 9 Alvin Kirkland (3); Al D. Kirkland (2); Harold Han; Jack Bonetti; Ed Demirjian; Bob Buckley; Goals: 7 Gary Kerkorian (7)	Attendance: 32,554; Gate: AU£ 3,533; Referee: Jack O'Brien

Team list:

New South Wales: FB: Clive Churchill (26) ( Souths), WG: Noel Pidding (26) ( St George), CE: Robert Bartlett (26) ( Wollongong), CE: Harry Wells (21) ( Wollongong), WG: Tommy Ryan ( St George), FE: Rees Duncan (21) ( Kurri Kurri), HB: Keith Holman (25) ( Wests), LK: Ken Slattery (25) ( Parramatta), SR: Don Schofield (22) ( Cessnock), SR: Albert Paul (25) ( Lakes United), PR: Charlie Gill (30) ( Newcastle Northern Suburbs), HK: Ken Kearney (27) ( St George), PR: Roy Bull (23) ( Manly).
Brian Carlson (20) ( Newcastle Northern Suburbs) was initially selected but withdrew. Arthur Collinson (23) ( Wests) and Johnny Slade (20) ( Parramatta) were selected as reserves but did not play.
American All Stars: FB: Sol Naumu, WG: Bob Buckley, CE: Alvin E. Kirkland, CE: Harold Han, WG: Ed Demirjian, FE: Gary Kerkorian, HB: Ted Grossman, LK: Jack Bonetti, SR: Al D. Kirkland, SR: Mike Dimitro, PR: Fran Mandulay, HK: Pat Henry, PR: Vince Jones.

June 7	Combined Country	35–9	America	Wollongong Showground
	Tries: 7 Darcy Russell; Ron Battye; Don Schofield; Jack Lumsden; Robert Bartlett; Charlie Gill; Ernie Hammerton; Goals: 7 Darcy Russell (7)	[Team; Report; Report Report]	Tries: 1 Jack Bonetti; Goals: 3 Gary Kerkorian (3)	Attendance: 11,787; Gate: AU£ 1,627; Referee: Darcy Lawler

Team list:

Combined Country: FB: Darcy Russell ( Waratah Mayfield), WG: Brian Carlson ( Norths), CE: Harry Wells ( Wollongong), CE: Robert Bartlett ( Wollongong), WG: Jack Lumsden ( Coonabarabran), FE: Rees Duncan ( Kurri), HB: Noel Hill ( Maitland), LK: Ron Battye ( Gundagai), SR: Don Schofield ( Cessnock), SR: Albert Paul ( Lakes United), PR: Charlie Gill ( Norths), HK: Ernie Hammerton (Boorowa), PR: Bryan Orrock (Boorowa), Coach: Ray Stehr
The following were named as reserves but are not mentioned (as playing) in match reports: Guy Brazier (Dorrigo), Jack Seamer ( Port Kembla) and Bob Smith ( Port Kembla)
American All Stars: Al Abajian, Bill Albans, Jack Bonetti, Ted Grossman, Vince Jones, George Kauffman, Gary Kerkorian, Al D. Kirkland, Xavier Mena and Sydney Walker were mentioned in match reports, with one report mentioning that Pat Henry took the field as a replacement.

June 10	Western Division	24–21	America	Victoria Park, Dubbo
3pm	Tries: 6 Jack Grant; Bruce Cohen; Cec Edwards; Leo Nosworthy; Peter Burns; Jack Lumsden; Goals: 3 Jack Lumsden (3)	[Team; Report; Report Report]	Tries: 3 Jack Bonetti; Gary Kerkorian; Pat Henry; Goals: 6 Gary Kerkorian (6)	Attendance: 4,717; Gate: AU£ 1,186; Referee: Darcy Lawler

Team list:

Western Districts: FB: Gordon Head ( Baradine), WG: Bruce Cohen ( Wellington), CE: Brian Condon ( Mudgee), CE: Jack Grant ( Brewarrina), WG: Jack Lumsden ( Coonabarabran), FE: Peter Burns ( Bathurst Railway), HB: Cec Edwards (Trangie), LK: Leo Nosworthy ( Narromine), SR: Jock Weir ( Narromine), SR: Noel Flynn ( Lithgow Arms Factory), PR: Bertie Simpson ( Lithgow Arms Factory), HK: Barry Green ( Mudgee), PR: N. Towett (Trangie), Coach: Frank Bell ( Lithgow Arms Factory).
Brian (Blondie) Bolton (Dubbo) and Vin Corish ( Dunedoo) were named as reserves and took the field for the second half.
The following were initially selected but withdrew: Eric Dodd (Dubbo), Norman McKnight ( Forbes), B. Runsford (Lithgow).
American All Stars: FB: Sol Naumu, WG: Bob Buckley, CE: Harold Han, CE: Gary Kerkorian, WG: Ed Demirjian, FE: Ted Grossman, HB: Al Abajian, LK: Jack Bonetti, SR: Pat Henry, SR: Fran Mandulay, PR: Steve Drakulvich, HK: Sydney Walker, PR: Xavier Mena.
Vince Jones and George Kauffman took the field as replacements for injured players Drakulvich and Mena. The Dubbo Liberal match reports mentioned Ray Terry as being tackled into touch.

June 13	Newcastle	10–19	America	Newcastle Sports Ground
	Tries: 2 Bill Shanks; Brian Pead; Goals: 2 Darcy Russell (2)	[Teams; Report; Report Report]	Tries: 3 Harold Han (2); Gary Kerkorian; Goals: 5 Gary Kerkorian (5)	Attendance: 14,160; Gate: AU£ 2,136; Referee: Aub Oxford

Team list:

Newcastle: FB: Darcy Russell ( Waratah Mayfield), WG: Bill Shanks ( Waratah Mayfield), CE: Bill Smith ( Waratah Mayfield), CE: Brian Pead ( Centrals), WG: Lester Batey ( Cessnock), FE: Warren Foley ( Waratah Mayfield), HB: Noel Hill ( Maitland), LK: Barry Levido ( Cessnock), SR: Gordon Harley ( Maitland), SR: Henry Holloway ( Waratah Mayfield), PR: Doug Hawke ( Norths), HK: Kevin McKiernan ( Maitland), PR: Herb Pearson ( Kurri).
Billy Roberts ( Kurri) and Tom Anderson ( Norths) were named as reserves.
American All Stars: FB: Sol Naumu, WG: Alvin E. Kirkland, CE: Harold Han, CE: Bob Buckley, WG: Ed Demirjian, FE: Gary Kerkorian, HB: Ted Grossman, LK: Jack Bonetti, SR: Al D. Kirkland, SR: Mike Dimitro, PR: Fran Mandulay, HK: Vince Jones, PR: Pat Henry.
George Kauffman and Al Abajian were named as reserves and the latter is mentioned as playing in a match report.

June 17	Northern NSW	26–18	America	Brelsford Park, Coffs Harbour
	Tries: 6 Lyle McKay (3); Jim Ruge (2); Ken O'Reilly; Goals: 4 Bob Hillier (4)	[Team; Report; Report Report]	Tries: 4 Bob Buckley; Al Abajian; Ed Demirjian; Jack Bonetti; Goals: 3 Gary Kerkorian (3)	Attendance: 5,400; Gate: AU£ 707; Referee: Aub Oxford

June 20	Queensland	39–36	America	Brisbane Cricket Ground
3pm	Tries: 9 Bob Buckley (4); Kel O'Shea (2); Neil Teys; Athol Smith; Tom Tyquin; Goals: 6 Norm Pope (6)	[Teams; Report Report]	Tries: 6 Vince Jones (2); Al D. Kirkland; Ted Grossman; George Kauffman; Jack Bonetti; Goals: 9 Gary Kerkorian (9)	Attendance: 24,397; Gate: AU£ 3,983; Referee: Frank Ballard

June 24	Far North Queensland	17–17	America	Parramatta Park, Cairns
	Tries: 3 Gordon Farrelly (2); Roy Greenwood; Goals: 4 Gordon Farrelly (4)	[Teams; Report; Result Report]	Tries: 3 Bill Albans; Jack Bonetti; Al D. Kirkland; Goals: 4 George Kauffman (3); Field Goals: 1 George Kauffman	Attendance: 6,042; Gate: AU£ 1,202; Referee: V. Renton

June 28	North Queensland	38–17	America	Townsville Sports Reserve
	Tries: 8 Jack Fifield (2); Kel O'Shea (2); P. Farrell; Max Short; Keith Martin; Trevor Whitehead; Goals: 7 R. Quinn (7)	[Team; Report; Photo Report]	Tries: 3 Ted Grossman (2); Harold Han; Goals: 4 Gary Kerkorian (4)	Attendance: 7,898; Gate: AU£ 1,552; Referee: R. Allison

July 1	Central West Queensland	26–21	America	Longreach
	Tries: 6 McDonald (4); Lionel Wheatley; Norris; Goals: 4 Linde (4)	[ Report; Result Report]	Tries: 5 Alvin Kirkland; Al D. Kirkland; Harold Han; Xavier Mena; Al Abajian; Goals: 3 Gary Kerkorian (3)	Attendance: 1,635; Gate: AU£ 400; Referee: Maquire

July 5	Central Queensland	33–26	America	Murray Street Grounds, Rockhampton
	Tries: 9 Peter Robinson (4); W. Liddell (2); P. Sear (2); W. Clarke; Goals: 3 Ray Thomas (2); W. Liddell	[Report Report]	Tries: 6 Steve Drakulvich; Ted Grossman; Al Abajian; Gary Kerkorian; Mike Dimitro; Harold Han; Goals: 4 George Kauffman (2); Al D. Kirkland; Gary Kerkorian	Attendance: 5,332; Gate: AU£ 1,154; Referee: H. Gilbert

July 7	Brisbane	39–26	America	Brisbane Cricket Ground
	Tries: 9 George Hayes (3). Mundt (2); Len Blaik (2); Tom Tyquin; Jack Veivers; Goals: 6 Norm Pope (6)	[Team; Report Report]	Tries: 4 Al D. Kirkland; Harold Han; Al Abajian; Fran Mandulay; Goals: 7 Gary Kerkorian (7)	Attendance: 7,000; Gate: AU£ 1,050; Referee: Vic Lynagh

July 15	Toowoomba	29–15	America	Toowoomba
	Tries: 7 M. Higgins (3); Russ Brown (2); D. McMurtrie. Connolly; Goals: 4 M. Higgins (3); Cyril Connell Jr	[ Report Report]	Tries: 3 Bill Albans; Al Abajian; Xavier Mena; Goals: 3 Gary Kerkorian (3)	Attendance: 5,778; Gate: AU£ 893; Referee: Vic Vercoe

July 18	Ipswich	15–16	America	North Ipswich Reserve
	Tries: 3 Jim Pegg (2); Gary Parcell; Goals: 3 Errol Meteyard (3)	[ Report; Report Report]	Tries: 4 Bill Albans; Gary Kerkorian; Alvin Kirkland; Al Abajian; Goals: 2 Gary Kerkorian (2)	Attendance: 3,155; Gate: AU£ 645; Referee: Les McMahon

July 19	Wide Bay	33–33	America	Maryborough Showground
	Tries: 7 D. Nixon (2); K. Drysdale; K. Hutchins; A. Anderson; F. Heidke; W. Faine; Goals: 6 F. Heidke (6)	[ Report; Result Report]	Tries: 7 Bob Buckley (2); Gary Kerkorian; Bill Albans; Alvin Kirkland; Ted Grossman; Al Abajian; Goals: 6 Gary Kerkorian (6)	Attendance: 6,166; Gate: AU£ 1,124

July 22	Riverina	30–14	America	ANZAC Park, Gundagai
	Tries: 6 Roley McDonell (2); George Robertson; Len Koch; Brian Longhurst; Terry Brogan; Goals: 6 Len Koch (6)	[Team; Report; Result Report]	Tries: 2 Mike Dimitro; Al D. Kirkland; Goals: 4 Gary Kerkorian (4)	Attendance: 2,560; Gate: AU£ 576; Referee: Col Pearce

July 25	New South Wales	27–18	America	Sydney Cricket Ground
2.45pm	Tries: 5 Johnny Rouse; Ferris Ashton; Brian Carlson; Harry Wells; Noel Pidding; Goals: 6 Noel Pidding (6)	[Program; Report Report]	Tries: 4 Ken McCaffery; Brian Davies; Bill Albans; Al D. Kirkland; Goals: 3 Gary Kerkorian (3)	Attendance: 19,686; Gate: AU£ 2,272; Referee: Aub Oxford

== New Zealand leg ==
August 1	Auckland	54–26	America	Carlaw Park, Auckland
	Tries: 12; Goals: 9		Tries: 6 Goals: 4

August 4	Taranaki	18–21	America	Pukekura Park, New Plymouth
	Tries: 4 Goals: 3		Tries: 5 Frank Mulcare (3); Travers Hardwick; Roy Roff; Goals: 3 George Kauffman (2); Field Goals: 1 George Kauffman

August 7	Wellington	8–17	America	Basin Reserve, Wellington
	Tries: Goals:		Tries: Goals: George Kauffman (2)

August 11	West Coast	27–10	America	Wingham Park, Greymouth
	Tries: Goals:		Tries: Goals:

August 15	Canterbury	39–8	America	Addington Showground, Christchurch
	Tries: Goals:		Tries: Goals:	Attendance: 5,000

August 19	North Auckland	6–25	America	Jubilee Park, To Whangerei
	Tries: Goals:		Tries: Goals:	Attendance: 3,000

August 22	New Zealand Māori	40–23	America	Carlaw Park, Auckland
	Tries: Goals:		Tries: Goals:

August 24	South Auckland	19–2	America	Hamilton
	Tries: Goals:		Tries: Goals:

== Sources ==
Acronym	Item	Years	Database App	Notes
Direct Online Access
-	Pratten Park Magpies	1953	Website Page	Copies of photos and articles
RLN	Rugby League News	1920-1973	Trove	Match Program in Sydney, Team Lists, Team Photos, Articles
RLP	Rugby League Project	1907–present	RLP Website	Match dates and scores
Sun	The Sun (Sydney)	1910-1954	Trove	Match Reports, Articles.
DT	The Daily Telegraph (Sydney)	1931-1954	Trove	Match Reports, Articles.
CM	The Courier-Mail	1933-1954	Trove	Match Reports, Articles.
-	Various Australian Regional Newspapers	up to 1954	Trove	Match Reports, Given Names of Players
Offline Resources
-	Gavin Willacy's; No Helmets Required	1953	Copy at SLNSW	First published in 2013. Interviews with many of the players, or their family members. History of the tour, with each match discussed.
EECYB	E.E. Christensen's Official Rugby League Year Book	1946-1978	Copies at SLNSW	Teams, Point Scorers, Report. 1954 Yearbook includes a brief summary of the 1953 tour, with teams and point scorers for the three matches in Sydney.
QRLG	Queensland Rugby League Gazette	1950-1955	Copies at SLQ	Program for matches in Brisbane.
RRLG	Rockhampton Rugby League Gazette	1951-1968	Copies at SLQ	Program for matches in Rockhampton.
-	Ipswich Versus International Teams	1913-1975	Copies at SLQ & NLA	Match Report, Given Names & Club of Ipswich Players
-	A History of Mackay Rugby League	1919-2015	Author's Website	Given Names & Club of Ipswich Players
-	More Than The Foley Shield	1908-2014	Author's Website	Match report, team photos. Given Names & Club of North Queensland Players
