= 1956 New Zealand Māori rugby league tour of Australia =

- Manager: Ernie Asher and Wilf Davies
- Coach(es): Travers Hardwick
- Tour captain(s): Henry Maxwell
Summary
P	W	D	L
Total
14	6	0	8

Tour chronology
- Previous tour: 1922 by to 1956 by to
- Next tour: 1957 RLWC in 1958 by to 1983 by to

The 1956 New Zealand Māori rugby league tour of Australia was the fourth overseas tour by a Māori rugby league team. The previous three tours were also to Australia. There had been tours in both 1908 and 1909 during the code’s formative years. The third tour occurred in 1922.

In the rival code, New Zealand Māori Rugby Union teams had undertaken taken three tours since the conclusion of World War II:— to Fiji in 1948 and 1954, and to Australia in 1949.

In Rugby League, Māori teams had played touring teams in 1946, 1949, 1953, 1954 and 1955.

This Māori tour, which began on August 1, followed a tour by the New Zealand national team which had concluded in early July. Two players, Henry Maxwell and Mauriohooho (Joe) Murray participated in both tours. Simon Yates was on the Māori tour, whilst his brother John Yates had been on the Kiwis tour.

The October 1955 issue of the Rugby League News mentioned the prospect of a Māori tour to Australia. The December 1955 issue included a draft itinerary.

== Leadership ==
The Māori team was managed by Ernie Asher who had been a player on the 1908 and 1909 tours, and Wilf Davies.
Travers Hardwick coached the team. Hardwick had toured Australia with the New Zealand national team in 1948 and 1952.

The team was captained by Henry Maxwell, with George Turner serving as vice-captain.

== Squad ==
The Rugby League News published a Team Photo, Player Details (Age, Height and Weight) and Pen Portraits of the tourists.

Player	Position	Age (Note: Age as given in the ‘’Rugby League News’’ for the match against Metropolis)	Weight	Province
George Bell	Centre	26	13. 10 (87)	Auckland
Andrew Berryman	Fullback, Centre	25	13. 2 (83)	South Auckland
Jim Cassidy	Prop	27	16. 7 (105)	Auckland
Ted Cook	Hooker	24	13. 0 (83)	Auckland
Darby Diamond	Utility Back	27	13. 10 (87)	Auckland
Joe Gibbons	Centre	25	12. 6 (79)	Auckland
Ron Goodin	Fullback	25	13. 0 (83)	Auckland
Denis Hansen	Second-row	22	14. 3 (90)
Arney Hawkes	Lock	21	13. 7 (86)	Auckland
Russell Herawini	Five-eighth, Halfback	26	11. 7 (73)	Auckland
Barry Maddigan	Wing	19	12. 3 (78)	Auckland
Henry Maxwell	Prop	24	15. 0 (95)	Auckland
Hugh McKinnon	Wing	20	12. 7 (79)	South Auckland
Mauriohooho (Joe) Murray	Second-row	24	12. 6 (79)	Auckland
Bill Paki	Lock, Second-row	27	13. 7 (86)	South Auckland
Ted Penney	Utility Back	23	12. 4 (78)	Auckland
Vic Pirihi	Wing	19	12. 10 (81)	Auckland
Joe Rātima	Prop	28	16. 10 (106)	Auckland
Kingi Tamati	Hooker	22	12. 3 (78)	Taranaki
Bill Tauru	Utility Back	23	13. 6 (85)	Wellington
Jack Te Kawa	Five-eighth, Halfback	23	12. 8 (80)	Auckland
George Turner	Utility Back	24	12. 0 (76)	Auckland
Joe Wright	Halfback	28	12. 6 (79)	Auckland
Simon Yates	Second-row	20	13. 4 (84)	Auckland

== Matches ==
August 1	North Coast	8–10	Māori	Kempsey
	Tries: 2 B. Johnson; E. Carney; Goals: 1 J. Daley	[Teams; Report Report]	Tries: 2 Joe Rātima; Vic Pirihi; Goals: 2 Ron Goodin (2)	Attendance: 7,126; Referee: L. McCrae

Team list:

North Coast: FB: C. Robinson ( Nambucca), WG: S. Notaris (Upper Clarence), CE: E. Carney ( Wauchope), CE: Ray Lumsden (Urunga), WG: B. Johnson (Coffs), FE: J. Daley (Lismore), HB: O. Steele ( Nambucca), LK: George Smith (Glenreagh), SR: Arthur Collinson (Port Macquarie), SR: Guy Brazier (Dorrigo), PR: Lloyd Hudson ( Central Kempsey), HK: Percy Purchase (Kempsey CYM), PR: W. Rann (Richmond), Coach: Des Ponchard (Kempsey CYM).
New Zealand Māori: FB: Ron Goodin, WG: Hugh McKinnon, CE: Andrew Berryman, CE: George Turner, WG: Vic Pirihi, FE: Joe Gibbons, HB: Russell Herawini, LK: Arney Hawkes, SR: Simon Yates, SR: Mauriohooho (Joe) Murray, PR: Joe Rātima, HK: Kingi Tamati, PR: Henry Maxwell.

August 4	Brisbane	32–23	Māori	Brisbane
	Tries: Goals:	[Report Report]	Tries: Goals:	Attendance: 9,756

August 5	Central Queensland	24–38	Māori	Rockhampton
	Tries: Goals:		Tries: Goals:	Attendance: 6,000

August 11	Ipswich	21–11	Māori	North Ipswich Reserve
	Tries: 5 Denis Jackwitz (2); Barry Brennan (2); Jim Pegg; Goals: 3 Jim Holbeck (3)		Tries: 3 Jack Te Kawa; Jim Cassidy; Hugh McKinnon; Goals: 1 Ted Penney	Attendance: 2,000; Gate: AU£ 370; Referee: Nev Kelly

Team list:

Ipswich: FB: Jim Holbeck ( Booval Swifts), WG: Denis Flannery ( Brothers), CE: Les Duncan ( West End), CE: Barry Brennan ( West End), WG: Jim Pegg ( Brothers), FE: Don Barrett ( Booval Swifts), HB: Des Brown ( Railways), LK: Stan Walker ( Booval Swifts), SR: Jim Breslin ( Brothers), SR: Mick Scully ( West End), PR: Dud Beattie ( Railways), HK: Denis Jackwitz ( Railways), PR: Gary Parcell ( Brothers), Coach: Dan Dempsey (Ipswich).
New Zealand Māori: FB: Andrew Berryman, WG: Hugh McKinnon, CE: Ted Penney, CE: George Turner, WG: Barry Maddigan, FE: Jack Te Kawa, HB: Joe Wright, LK: Bill Paki, SR: Mauriohooho (Joe) Murray, SR: Simon Yates, PR: Joe Rātima, HK: Ted Cook, PR: Jim Cassidy.

August 12	Wide Bay	6–31	Māori	Bundaberg
	Tries: Goals:	[Result Report]	Tries: Goals:	Attendance: 2,630

August 15	Northern Division	17–15	Māori	Armidale
	Tries: Goals:		Tries: Goals:	Attendance: 3,000

August 18	Newcastle	19–15	Māori	Newcastle Sports Ground
	Tries: Goals:	[Report Report]	Tries: Goals:	Attendance: 9,918

August 22	Western Division	5–0	Māori	Dubbo
	Tries: 1 Goals: 1		Tries: 0 Goals: 0	Attendance: 2,500; Referee: C. Smith

August 26	Southern Division	17–16	Māori	Wollongong
	Tries: 3 Ron Smith; Bill Poland; Don Spence; Goals: 4 Darcy Russell (4)	[Report Report]	Tries: 2 Arney Hawkes; George Turner; Goals: 5 Ron Goodin (5)	Attendance: 4,000; Referee: H. Barwick

Team list:

Southern Division: FB: Darcy Russell ( Wests), WG: Jack Cuneo, CE: Tony Turner, CE: Les Jones ( Jamberoo), WG: Don Spence, FE: K. Keech, HB: Ron Smith, LK: Paul Broughton ( Corrimal), SR: Angus Miller ( Berry), SR: Pat Quinn ( Gerringong), PR: Bruce Noble ( Jamberoo), PR: Bill Poland ( Corrimal), HK: Ron Hopper, Coach: Leo Doyle.
New Zealand Māori: FB: Ron Goodin, WG: Barry Maddigan, CE: Andrew Berryman, CE: George Turner, WG: Vic Pirihi, FE: Ted Penney, HB: Joe Wright, LK: Arney Hawkes, SR: Mauriohooho (Joe) Murray, SR: Simon Yates, PR: Henry Maxwell, HK: Kingi Tamati, PR: Joe Rātima.

August 29	Group 9	21–19	Māori	Young
	Tries: Goals:		Tries: Goals:	Attendance: 3,000; Referee: D. Smith

September 2	Metropolis	20–22	Māori	Sydney Sports Ground
3pm	Tries: 4 Ray Ritchie (2); Norm Strong; Ian Johnston; Goals: 4 Doug Fleming (4)	[Program; Report Report]	Tries: 4 Barry Maddigan (2); Arney Hawkes; Kingi Tamati; Goals: 5 Mauriohooho (Joe) Murray (5)	Attendance: 13,148; Referee: Col Pearce

Team list:

Metropolis: FB: Doug Fleming ( St George), WG: Ray Burke ( Parramatta), CE: Merv Lees ( St George), CE: John Hobbs ( Manly), WG: Ray Ritchie ( Manly), FE: Ian Johnston ( Wests), HB: Peter Burke ( Manly), LK: Dick See ( Easts), SR: Jack (Buddy) Bowman ( Canterbury), SR: Henry Holloway ( Newtown), PR: Mark Patch ( Wests), HK: Norm Strong ( Norths), PR: Roy Fisher ( Parramatta).
Ray Cardilini ( Norths) and Bruce Sullivan ( Easts) were selected as reserves but did not play.
New Zealand Māori: FB: Andrew Berryman, WG: Hugh McKinnon, CE: George Turner, CE: Joe Gibbons, WG: Barry Maddigan, FE: Jack Te Kawa, HB: Joe Wright, LK: Arney Hawkes, SR: Bill Paki, SR: Mauriohooho (Joe) Murray, PR: Joe Rātima, HK: Kingi Tamati, PR: Henry Maxwell.

September 6	Monaro	13–67	Māori	Goulburn
	Tries: Goals:	[Team Report]	Tries: Goals:	Attendance: 1,200; Referee: W. Grugan

September 9	Sydney	37–7	Māori	Sydney Sports Ground
3pm	Tries: 7 Ray Ritchie; Bob Honeysett; Ray Cardilini; Bernie Purcell; Dick See; Harry Wells; Ian Johnston; Goals: 8 Gordon Clifford (6); Bernie Purcell (2)	[Program Report]	Tries: 1 Joe Rātima; Goals: 2 Andrew Berryman (2)	Attendance: 11,619; Referee: Col Pearce

Team list:

Sydney: FB: Gordon Clifford ( Newtown), WG: Ray Cardilini ( Norths), CE: Bob Honeysett ( Souths), CE: Harry Wells ( Wests), WG: Ray Ritchie ( Manly), FE: Ian Johnston ( Wests), HB: Col Donohoe ( Souths), LK: Dick See ( Easts), SR: Bernie Purcell ( Souths), SR: Bruce Sullivan ( Easts), PR: Don Evenden ( Norths), HK: Norm Strong ( Norths), PR: Les Hampson ( Newtown).
John Hobbs ( Manly) and Roy Fisher ( Parramatta) were selected as reserves but did not play.
Ernie Hammerton ( Souths) was originally selected but withdrew.
New Zealand Māori: FB: Andrew Berryman, WG: Hugh McKinnon, CE: George Turner, CE: Ron Goodin, WG: Barry Maddigan, FE: Jack Te Kawa, HB: Joe Wright, LK: Arney Hawkes, SR: Bill Paki, SR: Mauriohooho (Joe) Murray, PR: Joe Rātima, HK: Kingi Tamati, PR: Henry Maxwell.

September 13	Group 20	17–22	Māori	Griffith Ex-Servicemen's Oval
	Tries: 3 Laurie Foley (2); A. Campbell; Goals: 4 Fred Maxwell (4)	[Teams; Report Report]	Tries: 4 Ted Penney; George Turner; Vic Pirihi; Joe Rātima; Goals: 5 Mauriohooho (Joe) Murray (5)	Attendance: 2,460; Referee: Ray Ward

Team list:

Group 20: FB: Fred Maxwell ( Narrandera), WG: Laurie Foley ( Yenda), WG: A. Campbell ( Wagga Magpies), CE: Brian Clay ( Griffith), CE: Peter Payne ( Griffith), FE: A. Staunton ( Wagga Magpies), HB: D. Tucker ( Leeton), LK: Ossie Reberger (Wamoon), SR: B. Elliott ( Wagga Magpies), SR: Keith Kesby ( Griffith), PR: Keith Jack ( Leeton), HK: J. Castles ( Wagga Magpies), PR: Billy Watson (Wamoon).
L. Williams (Wamoon) and L. Grosso ( Yenda) were selected as reserves. George Phillips ( Leeton) was not in the selected team but is mentioned as playing in the match report of the local Griffith newspaper, The Area News.
New Zealand Māori: FB: Ron Goodin, WG: Vic Pirihi, WG: Ted Penney, CE: George Turner, CE: George Bell, FE: Russell Herawini, HB: Jack Te Kawa, LK: Bill Paki, SR: Denis Hansen, SR: Mauriohooho (Joe) Murray, PR: Joe Rātima, HK: Ted Cook, PR: Henry Maxwell.

== Sources ==
Acronym	Item	Years	Database App	Notes
Direct Online Access
RLN	Rugby League News	1920-1973	Trove	Match Program in Sydney, Team Lists, Team Photos, Articles
RLP	Rugby League Project	1907–present	RLP Website	Tour itinerary.
CQH	The Central Queensland Herald	1930-1956	Trove	Short match reports.
CT	The Canberra Times	1926-1995	Trove	Short match reports.
Offline Resources
EECYB	E.E. Christensen's Official Rugby League Year Book	1946-1978	Copies at State Library of NSW	Teams and Point Scorers for the two matches in Sydney. 1957 Yearbook covers the 1956 tour.
RRLG	Rockhampton Rugby League Gazette	1951-1968	Copies at State Library of Qld	Program for matches in Rockhampton. Collection includes club as well as Rockhampton and Central Queensland representative matches.
-	Ipswich Versus International Teams	1913-1975	Copies at SLQ & NLA	Match Report, Given Names & Club of Ipswich Players
-	The Bulimba Cup Era	1925-1972	Copies at SLQ & NLA	Clubs of Ipswich, Toowoomba and Brisbane players. This book includes Bulimba Cup match reports and team lists.
