= Tom Tyrrell =

Australia international rugby league player

Personal information
- Full name: Thomas William Tyrrell
- Born: 31 October 1927
- Died: 25 October 2008 (aged 80)

Playing information
- Position: Second-row
Club
Years	Team	Pld	T	G	FG	P
1950–54	Balmain Tigers	52	6	0	0	18
Representative
Years	Team	Pld	T	G	FG	P
1951–52	New South Wales	2	1	0	0	3
1952	Australia	2	0	0	0	0

Thomas William Tyrrell (31 October 1927 – 25 October 2008) was an Australian rugby league player.

A Fairfield C.Y.O. recruit, Tyrrell broke into Balmain's first-grade side in 1950 and the following year made his interstate debut for NSW as a second-rower. He represented Australia against New Zealand at the Sydney Cricket Ground in 1952 and subsequently won a place on the squad for the 1952–53 tour of Great Britain, where he replaced Ferris Ashton in the side for the 2nd Test at Manchester's Station Road. After captaining Balmain for much of the 1953 NSWRFL season, Tyrrell's career was stalled by a serious knee ligament injury.
