= Bill Collier =

Australian rugby league footballer

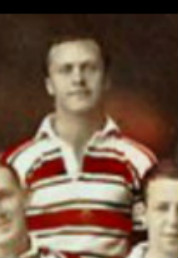

Personal information
- Full name: Ernest Frederick Collier
- Born: 27 June 1921 Kogarah, New South Wales, Australia
- Died: 19 October 2015 (aged 94) Mortdale, New South Wales, Australia

Playing information
- Position: Lock
Club
| Years | Team | Pld | T | G | FG | P |
|---|---|---|---|---|---|---|
| 1941–43 | St George Dragons | 28 | 2 | 0 | 0 | 6 |

Ernest Frederick "Bill" Collier (27 June 1921 – 19 October 2015) was an Australian rugby league footballer who played in the 1940s.

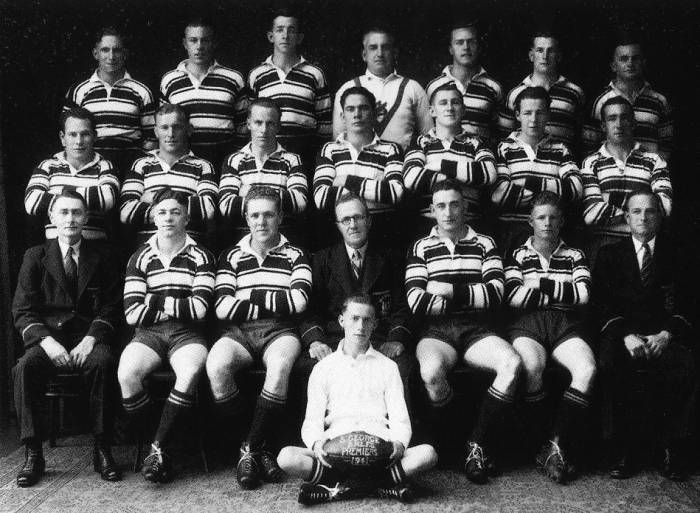
Collier (back, 3rd from right) in St. George's 1941 premiership-winning squad.

== Career ==
Born in Kogarah, New South Wales, 'Bill' Collier played three seasons with St George Dragons during the war years between 1941 and 1943. He was the last living squad member of the victorious Dragons 1941 premiership season and the losing 1942 Grand Final. He played centre and lock-forward with St George during his time at the club.

Collier was a father to 4 children, a grandfather to 11 grandchildren and a great-grandfather to 14 and lived much of his life in Kingsgrove, New South Wales.

== War service and later life ==
Collier's rugby league career was curtailed by World War II. He served in the Australian Army between 1942 and 1946, and saw active service in New Guinea and Borneo. The Ashton-Collier Medal is awarded to the 'man of the match' in the annual St George Illawarra Dragons and Sydney Roosters NRL match that is played on every Anzac Day. The medal is named in honour of Billy Collier and Ferris Ashton. Collier died on 19 October 2015 at the Ferndale Gardens Aged Care facility in Mortdale, New South Wales after a long illness.
