= Allen Geelan =

Australian rugby league footballer

Personal information
- Full name: Allen Geelan
- Born: 25 May 1959 (age 66) Sydney, New South Wales, Australia

Playing information
- Position: Second-row, Lock, Centre, Wing
Club
Years	Team	Pld	T	G	FG	P
1980–81	Canterbury Bankstown	8	1	0	0	3
1982	Eastern Suburbs	1	0	0	0	0
1983	Newtown Jets	18	3	0	0	12
1984–89	Western Suburbs	86	12	0	0	48
	Total	113	16	0	0	63
- Source: As of 3 June 2019
- Father: Col Geelan

Allen Geelan is an Australian former rugby league footballer who played in the 1970s and 1980s. He played for Newtown, Eastern Suburbs, Canterbury-Bankstown and Western Suburbs in the New South Wales Rugby League (NSWRL) competition.

== Background ==
Geelan played his junior rugby league for Riverwood before joining Canterbury-Bankstown in 1978. Geelan is the son of former Newtown and Canterbury-Bankstown player Col Geelan.

== Playing career ==
Geelan spent the first 2 years at Canterbury in reserve grade before making his first grade debut for the club in 1980. He played in 3 games during the season including the 22-17 major preliminary semi final victory over Western Suburbs, but was not selected as part of the Canterbury side which won their first premiership in 38 years against Eastern Suburbs. Geelan was instead a member of the reserve grade premiership winning team which defeated Parramatta.

The following season, Geelan made 5 appearances covering for an injured Garry Hughes. He scored his first try in round 4, also his first appearance starting at lock. Due to his involvement in a "all-in brawl", he was suspended from September 1981 until April of the following year, and was released by Canterbury at the end of the season. He made a total of 58 appearances for Canterbury across all grades. In 1982, Geelan joined Eastern Suburbs but only made 1 appearance for the club before signing with Newtown. He did, however, score a try in the reserve grade loss to Balmain.

Geelan played 18 games for Newtown in 1983 which would prove to be the club's last in the top grade of Australian rugby league. Over the course of the season, he began a transition from the second row to centre and winger. He played in Newtown's final ever match in the NSWRL premiership, which was a 9–6 victory over the Canberra Raiders at Campbelltown Stadium.

In 1984, Geelan joined Western Suburbs after Newtown were evicted from the premiership due to financial reasons. In his first season at Wests, the club finished last on the table with Geelan making a career high 20 appearances. He became a regular starter in the Wests team over the next few seasons as they struggled on the field. 1986 was the first season where played mostly on the wing. In round 2, he was sent off suspended for two weeks for headbutting. In round 22 he scored his first double of tries in a match against Balmain.

In 1987, Geelan played in 22 matches and scored a personal best 7 tries, including a double in round 2 against reigning premiers Parramatta in what was the first game after the Magpies moved to Campbelltown.

Geelan scored 2 tries from 12 appearances in 1988, and played the first 9 rounds of 1989. He retired at the end of the 1989 season.
