= Noel Hazzard =

Australia international rugby league footballer (1924–1986)

Personal information
- Full name: Gordon Noel Hazzard
- Born: 19 June 1924 Bundaberg, Queensland, Australia
- Died: 19 July 1986 (aged 62)

Playing information
- Weight: 14 st (89 kg)
- Position: Centre
Club
Years	Team	Pld	T	G	FG	P
	Natives (Bundaberg)
	Dalby
	Wattles (Roma)
	Total	0	0	0	0	0
Representative
Years	Team	Pld	T	G	FG	P
1946–54	Queensland	12
1951–54	Australia	13	2	0	0	6

Noel Hazzard (19 June 1924 – 19 July 1986) was an Australian rugby league footballer who played in the 1940s and 1950s. An Australian international and Queensland interstate representative three-quarter back, he played his club football in Bundaberg and Roma.

Hazzard captained a 'Natives' team in Queensland during the 1940s, suffering a broken collarbone in 1948.

During the 1950 Great Britain Lions tour Hazzard was selected to play at centre for Queensland in their 15-14 victory over the tourists.

In 1951 Hazzard was first selected to represent Australia, becoming Kangaroo number 284. During the 1951 France rugby league tour of Australia and New Zealand Hazard played at centre in the first and third Tests. Hazzard was selected to go on the 1952–53 Kangaroo tour of Great Britain and France. He played in 23 games, including an appearance at centre for Australia in the first test at Leeds.

During the 1954 Great Britain Lions tour Hazzard was selected to play for Australia in the 2nd Ashes test match, and also represented Toowoomba against the tourists.

Hazzard was selected to play for Australia from Roma Wattles against Great Britain in 1957.

In 2008, rugby league in Australia's centenary year, Hazzard was named at centre in the Bundaberg Rugby League's team of the century.
