= Newcastle & Hunter Rugby League =

Regional sports governing body in Australia

- Sport: Rugby league
- Formerly known as: Maitland & Coalfields Rugby League & Lower Hunter Rugby League
- Instituted: 2006
- Inaugural season: 2007
- Number of teams: 45
- Country: Australia
- Grand Final Winners: Waratah Mayfield Cheetahs (2025)
- Broadcast partner: Bar TV Sports (Australia)

Newcastle & Hunter Community Rugby League is the governing body of second tier rugby league in the Newcastle and Hunter Region and the 4th tier of Rugby League in Australia.

It is now the largest senior Rugby League competition in the world. Newcastle & Hunter Rugby League competitions consist of five senior men's divisions, A Grade, B Grade, C Grade, D Grade Northern Conference & D Grade Southern Conference. The league also has three Ladies League Tag divisions. Currently there are over 45 men's teams from 37 clubs and 21 Ladies League Tag teams.

== History ==
Formed in 2006 after a merger between the Maitland & Coalfields Rugby League and Lower Hunter Rugby League competitions. The inaugural season of Newcastle & Hunter Rugby League commenced in 2007 with 24 teams from 23 clubs entering 3 grades in the first season.

== Current clubs ==
A-Grade
| Club | Nickname | Founded | Home Ground | LGA | Location |
|---|---|---|---|---|---|
| Cardiff | Cobras | 1934 | Cardiff Oval | Lake Macquarie | Cardiff |
| Dudley | Magpies | 1981 | John Balcomb Oval | Lake Macquarie | Dudley |
| Morpeth | Bulls | 1911 | Morpeth Oval | Maitland | Morpeth |
| Raymond Terrace | Magpies | 2017 | Lakeside Sporting Complex | Port Stephens | Raymond Terrace |
| Shortland | Devils | 1968 | Tuxford Park | Newcastle | Shortland |
| University of Newcastle | Seahorses | 1970 | Bernie Curran Oval | Newcastle | Callaghan |
| Waratah Mayfield | Cheetahs | 1927 | Waratah Oval | Newcastle | Waratah |
| Windale | Eagles | 1962 | Mick Bird Field | Lake Macquarie | Windale |

B-Grade
| Club | Nickname | Founded | Ground | LGA | Location |
|---|---|---|---|---|---|
| Cardiff | Cobras | 1934 | Cardiff Oval | Lake Macquarie | Cardiff |
| Dudley | Magpies | 1981 | John Balcomb Oval | Lake Macquarie | Dudley |
| East Maitland | Griffens | 1911 | King Edward Park | Maitland | East Maitland |
| Hinton | Hornets | 1913 | Stuart Park | Maitland | Hinton |
| Karuah | Roos | | Lionel Morten Oval | Port Stephens | Karuah |
| Maitland United | Hitmen | 1988 | Coronation Oval | Maitland | Telarah |
| Stockton | Sharks | | Lynn Oval | Newcastle | Stockton |
| Waratah Mayfield | Cheetahs | 1927 | Waratah Oval | Newcastle | Waratah |

C-Grade
| Club | Nickname | Founded | Ground | LGA | Location |
|---|---|---|---|---|---|
| Kotara | Bears | 1967 | Newcastle | Hudson Park | Adamstown Heights |
| Clarence Town | Cobras | 1975 | Dungog | Clarence Town Park | Clarence Town |
| Dungog | Warriors | | Bennett Park | Dungog | Dungog |
| Fingal Bay | Bomboras | 1998 | Fingal Bay Oval | Port Stephens | Fingal Bay |
| Kearsley | Crushers | 2017 | Jeffrey Park | Cessnock | Kearsley |
| Swansea-Caves Beach | Swans | 1967 | Parbury Park | Lake Macquarie | Swansea |
| Stroud | Raiders | | Mid Coast | Stroud Showground | Stroud |
| West Wallsend | Magpies | 1971 | Les Wakeman Oval | Lake Macquarie | West Wallsend |

D-Grade Northern
| Club | Nickname | Founded | Ground | LGA | Location |
|---|---|---|---|---|---|
| Abermain-Weston | Hawks | 1913 | Howe Park | Cessnock | Abermain |
| East Maitland | Griffens | 1911 | Maitland | King Edward Park | East Maitland |
| Gloucester | Magpies | | Bert Gallagher Oval | Mid Coast | Gloucster |
| Mallabula | Panthers | 2010 | Mallabulla Sporting Complex | Port Stephens | Mallabulla |
| Paterson River | The Rivers | | Paterson Showground | Maitland | Paterson |
| Raymond Terrace | Magpies | 2017 | Lakeside Sporting Complex | Port Stephens | Raymond Terrace |
| Tea Gardens | Hawks | | Myall Park | Tea Gardens | Hawks Nest |
| Waratah Mayfield | Cheetahs | 1927 | Waratah Oval | Newcastle | Waratah |
| West Maitland | Kangaroos | 1967 | Coronation Oval | Maitland | Telarah |
D-Grade Southern
| Cardiff | Cobras | 1934 | Cardiff Oval | Lake Macquarie | Cardiff |
| Glendale | Gorillas | 1967 | Bill Bower Oval | Lake Macquarie | Glendale |
| Hamilton Ducks | Ducks | 2019 | Newcastle | Waratah Park | |
| Mallabula | Panthers | 2010 | Mallabulla Sporting Complex | Port Stephens | Mallabulla |
| Morisset | Bulls | | Gibson Field | Lake Macquarie | Morisset |
| University of Newcastle | Seahorses | 1970 | Bernie Curran Oval | Newcastle | Callaghan |
| Wallsend Maryland | Tigers | 1967 | Newcastle | Grange Oval | Maryland |

== Ladies League Tag ==
LLT A-Grade
| Club | Nickname | Founded | Ground | LGA | Location |
|---|---|---|---|---|---|
| Aberglasslyn | Ants | | | Cessnock | |
| Central Newcastle | Butcher Girls | | | Lake Macquarie | |
| Nelson Bay | Bandits | | | Port Stephens | |
| Raymond Terrace | Magpies | | | Port Stephens | |
| Singleton United | Greyhounds | | | Singleton | |
| University of Newcastle | Shehorses | | | Newcastle | |
| Wallsend Maryland | Tigers | | | Newcastle | |
| Waratah Mayfield | Cheetahs | | | Newcastle | |

LLT B-Grade
| Club | Nickname | Founded | Ground | LGA | Location |
|---|---|---|---|---|---|
| Cessnock | Goannas | | | Cessnock | |
| Clarence Town | Cobras | | | Dungog | |
| Morpeth | Bulls | 1911 | | Morpeth Oval | |
| Raymond Terrace | Magpies | | | Port Stephens | |
| Shortland | Devils | | | Newcastle | |
| Stockton | Sharks | | | Newcastle | |
| Swansea-Caves Beach | Swans | | | Lake Macquarie | |
| Thornton-Beresfield | Bears | | | Maitland | |
| University of Newcastle | Shehorses | | | Newcastle | |
| Waratah Mayfield | Cheetahs | | | Newcastle | |

LLT C-Grade
| Club | Nickname | Founded | Ground | LGA | Location |
|---|---|---|---|---|---|
| Dungog | Warriors | | | Dungog | |
| East Maitland | Griffens | 1911 | | Maitland | |
| Glendale | Gorillas | | | Lake Macquarie | |
| Gloucester | Magpies | | | Mid Coast | Gloucster |
| Kotara | Bears | | | Newcastle | |
| Mallabula | Panthers | 2010 | Mallabulla Sporting Complex | Port Stephens | Mallabulla |
| Nelson Bay | Bandits | | | Port Stephens | |
| Raymond Terrace | Magpies | | | Port Stephens | |
| Stroud | Raiders | | | Mid Coast | |
| Tea Gardens | Hawks | | | Mid Coast | |

== Former Men's clubs ==
| Club | First season | Last season | Home Ground | Region |
|---|---|---|---|---|
| Aberglasslyn Ants | | | | Cessnock |
| Awabakal United | | | | Lake Macquarie |
| Belmont North Sharks | | | Lenaghan Oval | Lake Macquarie |
| Belmont North Broncos | | | Lenaghan Oval | Lake Macquarie |
| Belmont South Rabbitohs | 2011 | | Lenaghan Oval | Lake Macquarie |
| Bolton Point Wolves | 1997 | | | Lake Macquarie |
| Booragul Bears | | 1996 | Tulkaba Park | Lake Macquarie |
| Budgewoi Bulldogs | | | | Central Coast |
| Bulahdelah Woodchoppers | | | | Mid North Coast |
| Carrington Pirates | | | Connelly Oval | Newcastle |
| Cessnock Cutters | | 2014 | | Cessnock |
| Dora Creek Swampies | 1969 | 2025 | Neville Thompson Oval | Lake Macquarie |
| Elermore Vale Miners | 1995 | 1998 | | Newcastle |
| Gateshead Zebras | 1972 | 2013 | Alan Davis Oval | Lake Macquarie |
| Hamilton Pumas | | | Learmonth Park | Newcastle |
| Kurri Kurri Bulldogs | | | | Cessnock |
| Lakeside Hawks | | | Lakeside Sports Complex | Port Stephens |
| Lambton Kingfishers | 1998 | 2016 | Ford Oval | Newcastle |
| Lakes United | 1947 | 2025 | Cahill Oval | Lake Macquarie |
| Maitland | 1955 | 2025 | Maitland Sportsground | Maitland |
| Merewether Storm | 1998 | 1998 | Empire Park | Newcastle |
| Mt Hutton Mountain Lions | | | | Lake Macquarie |
| Northern Lakes Warriors | 1976 | | | Central Coast |
| North Newcastle Blue Bags | 1989 | 2018 | Passmore Oval | Newcastle |
| Ourimbah-Wyoming Magpies | | 2022 | Bill Sohier Park | Central Coast |
| Singleton United Greyhounds | 1947 | 2025 | Pirtek Park | Singleton |
| South Newcastle Lions | | | | Newcastle |
| Tall Timbers Timber Cutters | 2019 | | Bill Sohier Park | Central Coast |
| Wangi Wangi Warriors | | 2022 | Wangi Oval | Lake Macquarie |
| Warners Bay-Mt Hutton | 1997 | 1997 | Mt Hutton Oval | Lake Macquarie |
| Williamtown/ Hexham Jets | | | Hexham Oval | Port Stephens/ Newcastle |
| West Maitland Wallaroos | | | Coronation Oval | Maitland |
| Westlakes Wolves | 1998 | 2002 | Tulkaba Park | Lake Macquarie |
| Woodberry Warriors | 1974 | 2025 | Fred Harvey Oval | Maitland |

== Honours ==
=== Newcastle & Hunter Rugby League 2007 - Present ===
A Grade
| Season | Minor Premiers | Premiers | Score | Runners-up |
|---|---|---|---|---|
| 2026 | Cardiff Cobras | Waratah Mayfield Cheetahs | 30 - 0 | Cardiff Cobras |
| 2025 | Waratah Mayfield Cheetahs | Waratah Mayfield Cheetahs | 24 - 8 | Dudley Magpies |
| 2024 | Raymond Terrace Magpies | Waratah Mayfield Cheetahs | 33-28 | Raymond Terrace Magpies |
| 2023 | - | Dora Creek Swampies | 20-14 | Waratah Mayfield Cheetahs |
| 2022 | - | Dora Creek Swampies | - | Woodberry Warriors |
| 2021 | Dora Creek Swampies | Dora Creek Swampies | - | - |
| 2020 | Dora Creek Swampies | Thornton Beresfield Bears | 22–18 | Dora Creek Swampies |
| 2019 | Dora Creek Swampies | Dora Creek Swampies | 44–4 | Belmont South Rabbitohs |
| 2018 | Stockton Sharks | Shortland Devils | 36–4 | Stockton Sharks |
| 2017 | Dora Creek Swampies | Fingal Bay Bomboras | 31–26 | Shortland Devils |
| 2016 | Windale Eagles | Windale Eagles | 18–10 | Shortland Devils |
| 2015 | Belmont South Rabbitohs | Belmont South Rabbitohs | 34–10 | Tea Gardens Hawks |
| 2014 | Belmont South Rabbitohs | Cardiff Cobras | 16–14 | Windale Eagles |
| 2013 | Wallsend-Maryland Tigers | Wallsend-Maryland Tigers | 35–16 | Belmont South Rabbitohs |
| 2012 | Windale Eagles | Wallsend-Maryland Tigers | 44–16 | Windale Eagles |
| 2011 | Windale Eagles | Windale Eagles | 20–16 | Mallabula Panthers |
| 2010 | Wangi Wangi Warriors | Wangi Wangi Warriors | 38–18 | West Wallsend Magpies |
| 2009 | Wyong Roos | Wyong Roos | 42–22 | Cardiff Cobras |
| 2008 | - | - | - | - |
| 2007 | Cardiff Cobras | Cardiff Cobras | - | |

B Grade
| Season | Minor Premiers | Premiers | Score | Runners-up |
|---|---|---|---|---|
| 2026 | Hinton Hornets | Hinton Hornets | 16 - 10 | Kotara Bears |
| 2025 | Morpeth Bulls | University Seahorses | 26 - 0 | Shortland Devils |
| 2024 | Fingal Bay Bomboras | East Maitland Griffins | 14 - 12 | Kotara Bears |
| 2020 | Waratah Mayfield Cheetahs | Waratah Mayfield Cheetahs | 8 – 4 | Aberglasslyn Ants |
| 2019 | Morpeth Bulls | West Wallsend Magpies | 18 – 16 | University Seahorses |
| 2018 | Woodberry Warriors | Woodberry Warriors | 46 – 10 | University Seahorses |
| 2017 | Kotara Bears | Dudley Magpies | 14 – 10 | Kotara Bears |
| 2016 | West Wallsend Magpies | Fingal Bay Bomboras | 28 – 24 | West Wallsend Magpies |
| 2015 | Lambton Kingfishers | Mallabula Panthers | 16 – 6 | Waratah Mayfield Cheetahs |
| 2014 | University Seahorses | Cessnock Cutters | 34 – 26 | Tea Gardens Hawks |
| 2013 | Morisset Bulls | Shortland Devils | 22 – 14 | Morisset Bulls Morisset Bulls |
| 2012 | Raymond Terrace Magpies | Stockton Sharks | 44 – 18 | Raymond Terrace Magpies |
| 2011 | Raymond Terrace Magpies | Tea Gardens Hawks | 30 – 28 | Raymond Terrace Magpies |
| 2010 | Woodberry Warriors | Mallabula Panthers | 16 – 12 | Raymond Terrace Magpies |
| 2009 | Central Wyong | Tea Gardens Hawks | 26 – 24 | Wangi Wangi |
| 2008 | - | - | - | - |
| 2007 | Windale Eagles | Windale Eagles | 20 – 16 | Morisset Bulls Morisset Bulls |

C Grade
| Season | Minor Premiers | Premiers | Score | Runners-up |
|---|---|---|---|---|
| 2026 | Swansea Caves Beach Swans | Swansea Caves Beach Swans | 32 - 12 | West Wallsend Magpies |
| 2025 | Maitland United | Karuah Roos | 34 - 28 | Stockton Sharks |
| 2024 | Stockton Sharks | Hinton Hornets | 32 - 24 | Dungog Warriors |
| 2020 | Budgewoi Bulldogs | Budgewoi Bulldogs | 22 – 12 | Hamilton Ducks |
| 2019 | Aberglasslyn Ants | Tall Timbers Timber Cutters | 30 – 12 | Aberglasslyn Ants |
| 2018 | East Maitland Griffins | Windale Eagles | 24 – 16 | East Maitland Griffins |
| 2017 | Abermain-Weston Hawks | Waratah Mayfield Cheetahs | 42 – 28 | Abermain-Weston Hawks |
| 2016 | Carrington Pirates | Carrington Pirates | 24 – 18 | Dungog Warriors |
| 2015 | Paterson River | Paterson River | 24 – 4 | Morisset Bulls |
| 2014 | Waratah Mayfield Cheetahs | Raymond Terrace Magpies | 18 – 12 | Waratah Mayfield Cheetahs |
| 2013 | Gateshead Zebras | Gateshead Zebras | 28 – 24 | Stroud Raiders |
| 2012 | Fingal Bay Bomboras | Dudley Magpies | 17 – 16 | Fingal Bay Bomboras |
| 2011 | Swansea Caves Beach Swans | Swansea Caves Beach Swans | 24 – 18 | Paterson River |
| 2010 | Dungog Warriors | Dungog Warriors | 28 – 20 | Dora Creek Swampies |
| 2009 | Thornton-Beresfield Bears | Thornton-Beresfield Bears | 32 – 16 | Hinton Hornets |

| D Grade Northern Conference | | | | | D Grade Southern Conference | | | |
| Season | Minor Premiers | Premiers | Score | Runners-up | Minor Premiers | Premiers | Score | Runners-up |
|---|---|---|---|---|---|---|---|---|
| 2026 | Raymond Terrace Magpies | Raymond Terrace Magpies | 24 - 0 | Abermain-Weston Hawks | Wallsend Maryland Tigers | Wallsend Maryland Tigers | 24 - 10 | Mallabula Panthers |
| 2025 | Stroud Raiders | Clarence Town Cobras | 30 - 22 | Mallabula Panthers | Swansea - Caves Beach Swans | Kearsley Crushers | 30 - 14 | West Wallsend Magpies |
| 2024 | Paterson River | Paterson River | 28 - 26 | Karuah Roos | Wallsend Maryland Tigers | Wallsend Maryland Tigers | 54 - 31 | Cardiff Cobras |
| 2020 | Kotara Bears | Kearsley Crushers | 18 – 12 | Kotara Bears | - | - | - | - |
| 2019 | Clarence Town Cobras | Dungog Warriors | 22 – 16 | Stroud Raiders | Swansea | Hamilton Ducks | 26 – 14 | Kotara Bears |
| 2018 | Gloucester Magpies | Paterson River | 42 – 16 | Gloucester Magpies | Kotara Bears | Abermain-Weston Hawks | 18 – 6 | Cardiff Cobras |
D Grade was split into Northern & Southern Conferences in 2018
| 2017 | Glendale Gorillas | Glendale Gorillas | 44 – 30 | Cardiff Cobras | | | | |
| 2016 | Hinton Hornets | Karuah Roos | 24 – 20 | Hinton Hornets | | | | |
| 2015 | Kotara Bears | Clarence Town Cobras | 30 – 20 | Kotara Bears | | | | |
| 2014 | Williamtown Jets | Williamtown Jets | 25 – 18 | Karuah Roos | | | | |
| 2013 | Carrington Pirates | Carrington Pirates | 22 – 18 | Thornton Beresfield Bears | | | | |
| 2012 | Abermain-Weston Hawks | Abermain-Weston Hawks | 34 – 26 | Hinton Hornets | | | | |
| 2011 | Gloucester Magpies | Gloucester Magpies | 38 – 24 | Morisset Bulls | | | | |
| 2010 | Stroud Raiders | Stroud Raiders | 32 – 18 | Clarence Town Cobras | | | | |
| 2009 | Fingal Bay Bomboras | Gateshead Zebras | 19 – 18 | Fingal Bay Bomboras | | | | |

=== Ladies League Tag ===
A Grade
| Season | Minor Premiers | Premiers | Score | Runners-up |
|---|---|---|---|---|
| 2026 | Central Butcher Girls | Central Butcher Girls | 14 - 10 | Waratah Mayfield Cheetahs |
| 2025 | Central Butcher Girls | Waratah Mayfield Cheetahs | 16 - 12 | Central Butcher Girls |
| 2024 | Central Butcher Girls | Central Butcher Girls | 18-0 | University She Horses |
| 2020 | Aberglasslyn Ants | Aberglasslyn Ants | 14–2 | University She Horses |
| 2019 | Aberglasslyn Ants | Aberglasslyn Ants | 20–0 | University She Horses |
| 2018 | Aberglasslyn Ants | Aberglasslyn Ants | 18–4 | University She Horses |
| 2017 | Aberglasslyn Ants | Aberglasslyn Ants | 18–0 | University She Horses |
| 2016 | Umina Bunnies | Umina Bunnies | 20–0 | |
B Grade
| Season | Minor Premiers | Premiers | Score | Runners-up |
| 2026 | East Maitland Griffins | Shortland Devils | 24 - 10 | East Maitland Griffins |
| 2025 | Singleton Greyhounds | Waratah Mayfield Cheetahs | 7 - 6 | Aberglasslyn Ants |
| 2024 | Wallsend Maryland Tigers | Wallsend Maryland Tigers | 16–8 | Cardiff Cobras |
| 2017 | - | Cardiff Cobras | 8–6 | West Wallsend Magpies |
| 2020 | Shortland Devils | Shortland Devils | 10–6 | Dungog Warriors |
| 2019 | Tea Gardens Hawks | West Wallsend Magpies | 32–0 | Wangi Wangi Warriors |
| 2018 | Mallabula Panthers | Mallabula Panthers | 8–0 | Swansea Caves Beach Swans |
C Grade
| Season | Minor Premiers | Premiers | Score | Runners-up |
| 2026 | Gloucester Magpies | Kotara Bears | 20 - 0 | Gloucester Magpies |
| 2025 | Raymond Terrace Magpies | Raymond Terrace Magpies | 12 - 8 | Swansea - Caves Beach Swans |
| 2024 | Dungog Warriors | Dungog Warriors | 10 – 8 | Shortland Devils |
| 2019 | Stroud Raiders | Stroud Raiders | 12 – 4 | Dungog Warriors |

=== Women's Tackle Premiers ===
| Season | Minor Premiers | Premiers | Score | Runners-up |
| 2020 | Berkeley Vale Panthers | Berkeley Vale Panthers | 24–14 | Aberglasslyn Ants |
| 2019 | Berkeley Vale Panthers | Berkeley Vale Panthers | 32–4 | Waratah Mayfield Cheetahs |
