= Alvin Kirkland =

American rugby league & gridiron player

Playing information
- Position: Wing, Centre, Five-eighth
Club
Years	Team	Pld	T	G	FG	P
1956	Parramatta	18	4	0	0	12
1957–58	Leeds RLFC			0	0
	Total	18	4	0	0	12
Representative
Years	Team	Pld	T	G	FG	P
1953	United States	14	11	0	0	33

Alvin Kirkland is an American former American football and rugby league player. Kirkland was a member of the "American All Stars" rugby league team a team made up of American college football players that went on the 1953 American All Stars tour of Australia and New Zealand. None of them had played rugby league before the tour. Kirkland returned to Australia in 1956, and played all regular season matches for the Parramatta District Rugby League Football Club in that year's New South Wales Rugby Football League season.
