= Bill Albans =

American triple jumper

Personal information
- Full name: William Everett Albans
- Nationality: American
- Born: December 23, 1925 Bayonne, New Jersey, United States
- Died: January 15, 1990 (aged 64) San Juan, Puerto Rico

Sport
- Sport: Athletics
- Event: Triple jump
- College team: University of North Carolina, Occidental College
- Club: Warinanco Athletic Club

William Everett Albans (December 23, 1925 – January 15, 1990) was an American athlete. He competed in the men's triple jump at the 1948 Summer Olympics. He was also in USA's squad for the 1952 Summer Olympics. Albans was also a strong sprinter; his personal best for 100 yards was 9.5. He also played rugby league for USA in the 1953 American All Stars tour of Australia and New Zealand.
