= André Carrère =

France international rugby league & union player

- Date of birth: 6 March 1924
- Place of birth: Villeneuve-de-Marsan, Landes, Nouvelle-Aquitaine, France
- Date of death: 21 February 2015 (aged 90)
- Place of death: Biganos, France

Rugby union career
- Position(s): Prop
Senior career
Years	Team	Apps	(Points)
	Stade Montois		()
- Rugby league career

Playing information
- Position: Prop
Club
Years	Team	Pld	T	G	FG	P
1951	Villeneuve-sur-Lot
Representative
Years	Team	Pld	T	G	FG	P
1953	France	2				0

André Carrère (Villeneuve-de-Marsan, 6 March 1924 - Biganos, 21 February 2015) was a French rugby union and league footballer. After making his rugby union debut for Stade Montois, he switched codes to rugby league in 1951, playing for Villeneuve-sur-Lot and was capped twice for France in 1953.

== Biography ==
Born in Villeneuve-de-Marsan, where he discovered rugby union, Carrère joined the Stade Montois club, which was close to his hometown. In 1951, he switched to rugby league at Villeneuve-sur-Lot, scouted by the doctor Pierre Mourgues. In 1953, he was capped two times for the France national team.

== Honours ==
=== Rugby union ===
- Runner up at the French Rugby Union Championship: 1949 (Stade Montois)

== Rugby league ==
- Runner up at the Lord Derby Cup: 1953 (Villeneuve XIII RLLG)
- Runner up at the Rugby League World Cup: 1954 ( France)

== Personal life ==
Outside of the pitch, he was a fusilier marin during his military service for the French Navy. His brother, Robert Carrère, still played rugby union, disputed the final of the French Rugby Union Championship in 1953 playing for Stade Montois.
