= Col Donohoe =

Australian rugby league footballer and coach

Personal information
- Full name: Matthew Colin Donohoe
- Born: 2 August 1929; Sydney, New South Wales, Australia
- Died: 16 June 1986 (aged 56); Sydney, New South Wales, Australia

Playing information
- Position: Halfback
Club
Years	Team	Pld	T	G	FG	P
1951–53	Eastern Suburbs	44	14	3	0	45
1955–59	South Sydney	85	13	0	0	39
	Total	129	27	3	0	84
Representative
Years	Team	Pld	T	G	FG	P
1950	NSW Country	1	0	0	0	0
1952–53	Australia	2	0	0	0	0
1954–56	New South Wales	4	1	0	0	3

Coaching information
Club
Years	Team	Gms	W	D	L	W%
1953	Eastern Suburbs	20	10	1	9	50

Matthew Colin "Col" Donohoe (1929–1986) was an Australian professional rugby league footballer for the Eastern Suburbs and South Sydney clubs, playing between 1951 and 1959.

== Club career ==
Col Donohoe, a half-back, played 4 seasons with the Sydney Roosters in 1949, 1951,1952 and 1953. Donohoe then played 5 seasons at South Sydney Rabbitohs between 1955 and 1959. He is remembered by South's fans as the man who scored a try late in the grand final that won South Sydney Rabbitohs the 1955 Premiership.

== Representative career ==
Col Donohoe represented NSW Country Firsts on one occasion in 1950. He then represented New South Wales on three occasions in the years 1954 and 1956.

He also played half-back for the Kangaroos, in the Third Test against New Zealand representing Australia for the first time on 2 July 1952. Donohue is listed on the Australian Players Register as Kangaroo No.294.

Col Donohoe died in 1986 following complications during an operation for a hip replacement 47 days short of his 57th birthday.
