= Col Geelan =

Australia international rugby league footballer and coach

Personal information
- Full name: Stanley Colin Geelan
- Born: 11 March 1927 Sydney, New South Wales, Australia
- Died: 11 May 1996 (aged 69) Bawley Point, New South Wales, Australia

Playing information
- Position: Centre, Five-eighth
Club
| Years | Team | Pld | T | G | FG | P |
|---|---|---|---|---|---|---|
| 1948–54 | Newtown | 75 | 32 | 0 | 0 | 96 |
| 1956–57 | Canterbury-Bankstown | 32 | 2 | 0 | 0 | 6 |
| | Total | 107 | 34 | 0 | 0 | 102 |
Representative
| Years | Team | Pld | T | G | FG | P |
| 1951–53 | Australia | 8 | 4 | 0 | 0 | 12 |
| 1952–54 | New South Wales | 3 | 1 | 0 | 0 | 3 |

Coaching information
Club
| Years | Team | Gms | W | D | L | W% |
| 1954 | Newtown | 20 | 15 | 2 | 3 | 75 |
| 1957 | Canterbury-Bankstown | 18 | 3 | 1 | 14 | 17 |
| | Total | 38 | 18 | 3 | 17 | 47 |
- Relatives: Allen Geelan (son)

Stanley Colin (Col) Geelan (1927–1996) was an Australian rugby league footballer and coach.

== Career ==
A Newtown Junior, Geelan started his career at Newtown in 1948, but then spent the 1949 season at Gunnedah before returning in 1950. He played five-eight and centre during his career.

He played five seasons for Newtown between 1950 and 1954 playing over 75 first grade games, then captain-coached Rockhampton, Queensland in 1955.

He returned to Sydney to captain Canterbury-Bankstown in 1956, and he captain-coached them in 1957 before retiring.

== Representative career ==
Col Geelan also represented New South Wales in three games between 1952 and 1954. He was selected for Australia on 8 occasions between 1951 and 1953 including the 1952/53 Kangaroo Tour. He is listed on the Australian Players Register as Kangaroo No.287.

He was appointed player-coach of Newtown in 1954 and they won the minor premiership but he missed the Grand Final through injury.

Geelan died on 11 May 1996, age 69 at his home in Bawley Point, New South Wales.
