= Don Schofield =

Australia international rugby league footballer

Personal information
- Born: 21 November 1930 Cessnock, New South Wales, Australia
- Died: 24 April 1999 (aged 68)

Playing information
- Position: Forward
Club
Years	Team	Pld	T	G	FG	P
19??–5?	Cessnock
1952	Wests (Sydney)	17	9	0	0	27
195?–5?	Cessnock
195?–5?	Muswellbrook
	Total	17	9	0	0	27
Representative
Years	Team	Pld	T	G	FG	P
1951–62	Newcastle
1953–65	Country NSW	5	2	0	0	6
1953–58	New South Wales	7	2	0	0	6
1957	Australia	2	0	0	0	0

Don Schofield was an Australian professional rugby league footballer who played in the 1950s and 1960s. An Australia national and New South Wales state representative forward, he played his club football in the Newcastle Rugby League for Cessnock and in the New South Wales Rugby League for Sydney's Western Suburbs.

Schofield initially played in the Newcastle Rugby League for the Cessnock club, appearing in their grand final victory of 1950. While playing for Cessnock, he was selected to represent Newcastle when they hosted the 1951 French touring side and lost. Schofield then played in the New South Wales Rugby Football League premiership for the Western Suburbs Magpies, scoring two tries in their Grand Final win in the 1952 season and was voted man of the match winning prize money of £10. He suffered a groin injury in that match which required surgery in the off-season.

Schofield returned to Cessnock, playing in each of their Newcastle Rugby League grand finals victories of 1954, 1955 and 1960. Towards the end of his career he captained the Newcastle team against the touring Great Britain side in 1962. His son Michael Schofield played rugby league for the Balmain Tigers and the Country New South Wales team.

Don Schofield died in April 1999, aged 68.

In 2011, the Cessnock club's centenary year, Schofield was named at second-row forward in a Cessnock 'Team of the Century'.
