= Ron Taylor (rugby league) =

Australian rugby league footballer (1932–2024)

Personal information
- Full name: Ronald Taylor
- Born: 27 June 1932 Sydney, Australia
- Died: 29 December 2023 (aged 91)

Playing information
- Position: Centre
Club
Years	Team	Pld	T	G	FG	P
1953–54	Eastern Suburbs	14	3	23	0	55
1957–61	South Sydney	40	4	20	0	52
	Total	54	7	43	0	107
Representative
Years	Team	Pld	T	G	FG	P
1958	New South Wales	1	0	0	0	0
1958	NSW City	1	1	0	0	3
- Source: As of 9 July 2019

Ronald Taylor (27 June 1932 – 29 December 2023) was an Australian rugby league footballer in the New South Wales Rugby League (NSWRL) who played for both the Eastern Suburbs and South Sydney clubs as well as being a representative of his state – NSW – in that sport.

A centre, Taylor began his rugby league career with Eastern Suburbs in 1953 where he played 16 matches before injuries forced his early retirement at the end of the 1954 season.

Taylor came out of retirement in 1957, playing 40 matches for the South Sydney club in the years (1957–61). In the 1958 season the centre was selected to represent NSW.

Taylor died on 29 December 2023, at the age of 91.
