= The Central Queensland Herald =

Newspaper in Queensland, Australia

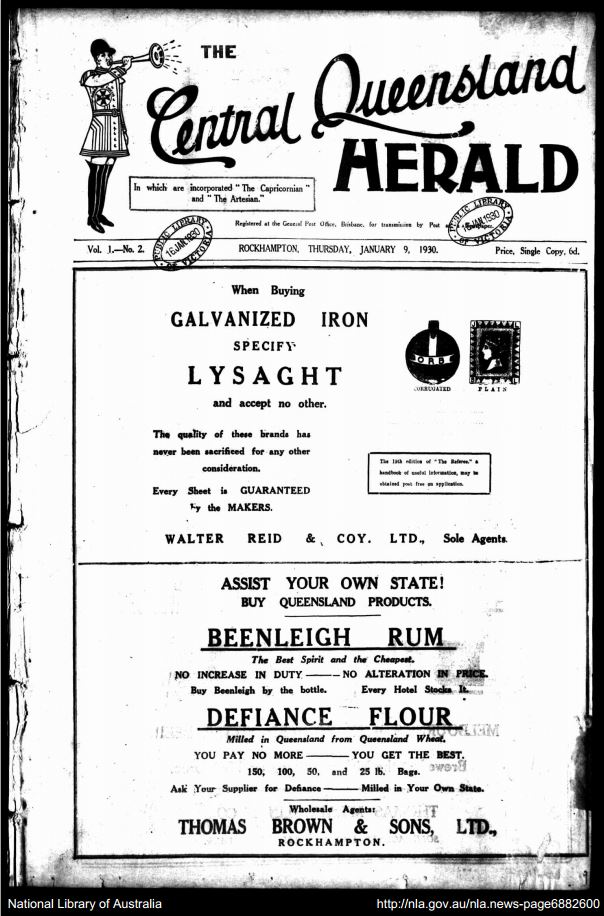
Front page of The Central Queensland Herald, 9 January 1930.

The Central Queensland Herald was a newspaper published in Rockhampton, Queensland from 1930 to 1956; it was created with the merger of The Artesian and The Capricornian.

== History ==
The Central Queensland Herald was published from 2 January 1930 to 29 November 1956.

== Digitisation ==
The paper has been digitised as part of the Australian Newspapers Digitisation Program of the National Library of Australia.

== See also ==
- List of newspapers in Australia
