= Noel Hill (rugby league) =

Australian rugby league footballer

Personal information
- Full name: Noel Edward Hill
- Born: 18 March 1927 Bulli, New South Wales, Australia
- Died: 24 September 1965 (aged 38) South Melbourne, Victoria, Australia

Playing information
- Position: Halfback
Club
Years	Team	Pld	T	G	FG	P
1948–50	St. George	58	7	0	0	21
Representative
Years	Team	Pld	T	G	FG	P
1952–53	NSW Country	2	0	0	0	0

Noel Edward Hill (1927–1965) was an Australian rugby league footballer who played in the 1940s and 1950s in the New South Wales premiership competition.

== Career ==
A south coast junior, Hill was a halfback for St. George for three seasons between 1948 and 1950. He won a premiership with St George, playing halfback in the 1949 Grand Final victory over South Sydney.

In 1951, Hill returned to Thirroul, and was selected for NSW Country in 1952 and 1953, captaining that representative side in 1952.

== Death ==
Hill died of a cerebral hemorrhage in South Melbourne on 24 September 1965. A son and a daughter survived him. He was buried at Melbourne General Cemetery, Carlton on 28 September 1965.
