= Jack Lumsden (rugby league) =

Australian rugby league footballer (1930–2023)

Personal information
- Born: 24 March 1930; Kurri Kurri, New South Wales, Australia
- Died: 31 March 2023 (aged 93)

Playing information
- Position: Wing
Club
Years	Team	Pld	T	G	FG	P
1951–52	Manly-Warringah	30	21	12	0	87
Representative
Years	Team	Pld	T	G	FG	P
1952	Australia	1	0	0	0	0
1953	NSW Country	1	0	0	0	0
- Source: As of 26 March 2019
- Relatives: Eddie Lumsden (brother)

Jack Lumsden (24 March 1930 – 31 March 2023) was an Australian professional rugby league footballer who played in the 1950s. He played for Manly-Warringah in the NSWRL competition.

== Background ==
Lumsden was the older brother of St. George legend Eddie Lumsden who won nine premierships for the St George club between 1957 and 1966.

== Playing career ==
Lumsden began his first grade career with Manly in 1951. That year, Manly finished second on the table and made the finals for the first time in their history. Manly went on to reach the 1951 NSWRL grand final against South Sydney. Lumsden played on the wing as Souths comprehensively beat Manly 42–14 in the final which was played at the Sydney Sports Ground. At the time this was the highest scoring grand final since 1908. Lumsden finished the season as the club's second highest try scorer for the year. Lumsden capped off the year after being selected to play for Australia in one test against New Zealand.

Lumsden played on with Manly in 1952 but the club missed out on the finals. Lumsden then departed the club to play for Wollongong in the country rugby league competition where he was selected to represent New South Wales Country in 1953.
