= Villeneuve-de-Marsan =

- Commune
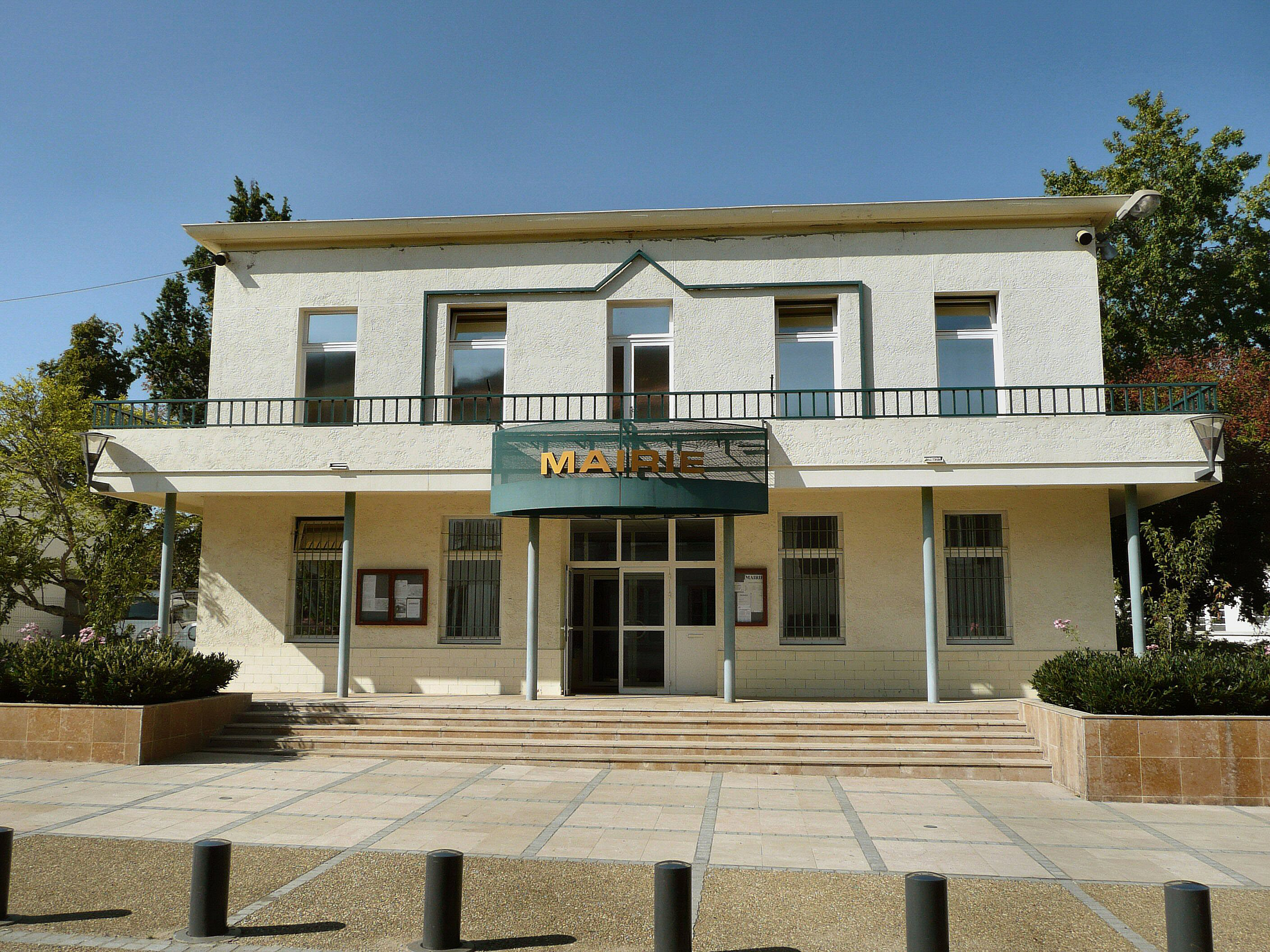
- Town hall
- Location of Villeneuve-de-Marsan
- Location within France Location within Nouvelle-Aquitaine
- Coordinates: 43°53′38″N 0°18′19″W
- Country: France
- Region: Nouvelle-Aquitaine
- Department: Landes
- Arrondissement: Mont-de-Marsan
- Canton: Adour Armagnac
- Intercommunality: Pays de Villeneuve en Armagnac Landais

Government
  - Mayor (2020–2026): Patrick Campagne
- Area^{1}: 23.14 km^{2} (8.93 sq mi)
- Elevation: 86 m (282 ft)
- Highest elevation: 116 m (381 ft)
- Lowest elevation: 48 m (157 ft)
- Population (2023): 2,508
  - Density: 108.4/km^{2} (280.7/sq mi)
- Time zone: UTC+01:00 (CET)
  - Summer (DST): UTC+02:00 (CEST)
- INSEE/Postal code: 40331 /40190
- ^{1} French Land Register data, which excludes lakes, ponds, glaciers > 1 km^{2} (0.386 sq mi or 247 acres) and river estuaries.

Villeneuve-de-Marsan (French pronunciation: [vilnœv də maʁsɑ̃]; Occitan: Vilanava de Marsan) is a commune in the Landes department in Nouvelle-Aquitaine in southwestern France.

== Population ==
Historical population

Year	Pop.	±% p.a.
1793	1,600	—
1821	1,338	−0.64%
1846	1,826	+1.25%
1872	2,103	+0.54%
1901	1,841	−0.46%
1926	1,610	−0.53%
1946	1,514	−0.31%
1962	1,848	+1.25%
1968	1,915	+0.60%

Year	Pop.	±% p.a.
1975	2,122	+1.48%
1982	2,035	−0.60%
1990	2,107	+0.44%
1999	2,112	+0.03%
2007	2,333	+1.25%
2012	2,378	+0.38%
2017	2,413	+0.29%
2023	2,508	+0.65%

Source: EHESS and INSEE (1968–2023)

== See also ==
- Communes of the Landes department
