= Greg Hawick =

Australia international rugby league footballer and coach (1932–2020)

Personal information
- Full name: Gregory Rawson Hawick
- Born: 3 May 1932 Sydney, New South Wales, Australia
- Died: 6 February 2020 (aged 87) Wagga Wagga, New South Wales, Australia

Playing information
- Position: Centre, Five-eighth, Halfback, Lock
Club
| Years | Team | Pld | T | G | FG | P |
|---|---|---|---|---|---|---|
| 1950–56 | South Sydney | 81 | 19 | 63 | 0 | 183 |
| 1957–58 | Wagga |
| 1959–60 | North Sydney | 23 | 2 | 14 | 0 | 34 |
| 1961–63 | Wagga |
| | Total | 104 | 21 | 77 | 0 | 217 |
Representative
| Years | Team | Pld | T | G | FG | P |
| 1953–58 | New South Wales | 8 | 0 | 0 | 0 | 0 |
| 1952–58 | Australia | 6 | 2 | 0 | 0 | 6 |

Coaching information
Club
| Years | Team | Gms | W | D | L | W% |
| 1960 | North Sydney | 0 | 0 | 0 | 0 |
| 1984–85 | North Sydney Bears | 33 | 12 | 0 | 21 | 36 |
| | Total | 33 | 12 | 0 | 21 | 36 |

Greg Hawick (3 May 1932 – 6 February 2020) was an Australian rugby league footballer and coach. A fine utility back for the champion South Sydney Rabbitohs teams in the 1950s and a representative player in the Australian national side, he was named at five-eighth in an Australian 1950s rugby league team of the decade.

== Playing career ==
A South Sydney junior Hawick had played with the Alexandria Rovers junior club. Hawick made his first-grade debut with Souths in 1950 as a lock forward but subsequently switched to the backline playing halfback and centre. He won a premiership with Souths in his debut year, but then missed out on a second in season 1951 when his jaw was broken in the semi-final against St George. Hawick's career with South Sydney stretched from 1950 to 1956, during which he played in five premiership winning teams. In all he played 84 first grade games scoring 19 tries and kicking 62 goals for a total of 181 career points. Hawick was selected to go on the 1952–53 Kangaroo tour of Great Britain and France with the Australia national rugby league team, playing two tests, another 16 tour matches and scoring eight tries. He also went on the 1953 Kangaroo tour of New Zealand, playing two tests, six other tour matches and scoring two tries and kicking three goals. During the 1954 Great Britain Lions tour Hawick was selected to play for New South Wales against the visitors. Hawick eventually gained his second premiership victory in the 1954 NSWRFL season. He played in the first World Cup in 1954 and was part of the 1957 World Cup-winning team.

Hawick made six Test appearances for the Australian national side. He also played eight games for New South Wales including appearances in 1957 & 58 when his club football was played in the country. Hawick played his club football with Wagga in country New South Wales for the 1957 & 58 season. He fought a landmark battle against the NSWRFL in 1958 when after having signed a contract with North Sydney he reneged, chose to stay in Wagga and was disqualified by the League. An equity court ruled that the disqualification was a denial of natural justice and he was able to play the season in Wagga and was still selected in the state and the national team that year. During the 1958 Great Britain Lions tour Hawick was selected to play for New South Wales and Australia in the 2nd and 3rd Ashes tests matches. Hawick was lured to North Sydney for the 1959 & 1960 seasons. He returned to country rugby league with Wagga from 1961 and his playing career ended there in 1963 a result of another broken jaw.

In 2004 he was named by Souths in their South Sydney Dream Team, which consisted of seventeen players and a coach representing the club from 1908 through to 2004. In 2007 Hawick was selected by a panel of experts at five-eighth in an Australian 'Team of the 50s'.

== Coaching career ==
Hawick coached in the New South Wales Rugby League premiership for the North Sydney Bears from 1983 until his sacking midway through the 1985 NSWRL season.

== Sources ==
- Andrews, Malcolm, The ABC of Rugby League, Austn Broadcasting Corpn, Sydney.
- Whiticker, Alan & Hudson, Glen (2006) The Encyclopedia of Rugby League Players, Gavin Allen Publishing, Sydney
- "Team of the 50s named". The Daily Telegraph. Archived from the original on 11 August 2011.
- Greg Hawick at yesterdayshero.com.au

== Footnotes ==
Sporting positions
| Preceded by John Hayes; 1983–1984 | Coach North Sydney; 1985 | Succeeded by Brian Norton; 1985–1986 |
| Preceded by Ross McKinnon; 1959 | Coach North Sydney; 1960 | Succeeded by Bob Sullivan; 1961–1962 |
