= Jack Evans (rugby, born 1922) =

Former GB & Wales international rugby league footballer

Personal information
- Full name: John David Evans
- Born: 24 December 1922 Wales
- Died: 1993 (aged 71) West Sussex, England

Playing information

Rugby union
Club
Years	Team	Pld	T	G	FG	P
	Newport RFC

Rugby league
- Position: Fullback
Club
Years	Team	Pld	T	G	FG	P
1948–56	Hunslet	245	17	88	0	227
Representative
Years	Team	Pld	T	G	FG	P
1950–53	Wales	10	0	14	1	30
1951–53	Great Britain	6	0	4	0	8

John David Evans (24 December 1922 – 1993) was a Welsh rugby union and professional rugby league footballer who played in the 1940s and 1950s. He played club level rugby union (RU) for Newport RFC, and representative level rugby league (RL) for Great Britain and Wales, and at club level for Hunslet, as a fullback.

== International honours ==
Jack Evans won 10 caps for Wales (RL) in 1950–1953 while at Hunslet, and won caps for Great Britain (RL) while at Hunslet in 1951 against New Zealand; and in 1952 against Australia (3 matches).

Jack Evans also represented Great Britain in two non-Test matches while at Hunslet in the 12–22 defeat by France at Parc des Princes, Paris on Thursday 22 May 1952, and the 17–22 defeat by France at Stade de Gerland, Lyon on Sunday 24 May 1953.
