= Ken McCaffery =

Australian rugby league footballer (1929–2021)

Personal information
- Born: 27 September 1929
- Died: 6 February 2021 (aged 91)

Playing information
- Height: 5 ft 10 in (1.78 m)
- Position: Utility Back
Club
Years	Team	Pld	T	G	FG	P
1948–50	Easts (Sydney)	50	12	9	0	54
1951–54	Souths (Toowoomba)
1955–56	Fortitude Valley
1957–59	North Sydney	30	10	2	0	34
	Total	80	22	11	0	88
Representative
Years	Team	Pld	T	G	FG	P
1951–55	Queensland	16	7	0	0	21
1953–57	Australia	12	8	0	0	24
1953	American All Stars

Ken McCaffery (27 September 1929 – 6 February 2021) was an Australian professional rugby league footballer, commentator and administrator. As a player, he was an Australian national and Queensland state representative back. He played his club football in Sydney, Toowoomba and Brisbane. After playing, McCaffery became a radio and television commentator for the game and later an administrator for the North Sydney Bears.

== Playing career ==
McCaffery started playing first grade rugby league with Sydney's Easts club in the New South Wales Rugby Football League premiership in 1948. After three seasons with them, he was persuaded to move to Toowoomba by legendary Queensland footballer Duncan Thompson. In his first year playing in Toowoomba, McCaffery was selected to represent Queensland. The following year, he was selected to play for the Kangaroos, appearing in his first test in 1953 and playing for Australia in the 1954 World Cup. He moved to the city to play in the Brisbane Rugby League premiership with the Fortitude Valley club in 1955. Having become Queensland captain, McCaffery returned to Sydney to play with Norths from 1957. That year, he was part of the 1957 World Cup-winning Australian side. He lent his vast experience to the Norths club but suffered a shoulder injury and retired after two seasons.

== Post-playing career ==
Post-playing, McCaffery became a commentator with Channel 9, school's liaison officer for the NSWRFL and assistant secretary to the NSWRFL before being approached to take on the club secretary role at Canterbury after the 'coup' of 1969. A decade later, he moved back to Norths as club secretary. Credited with bringing Mark Graham and Mitchell Cox to the club, he also battled to improve the image and financial position of the Bears. In 1982, McCaffery sacked successful coach Ron Willey and later appointed Greg Hawick, who had not coached in Sydney for almost 20 years. Hawick resigned in 1985 and McCaffery was voted out of office the following year. Ken later retired and became a publican in Lismore.

He died in February 2021 at the age of 91. His son Paul also played for Norths in the 1980s.
