= Waratah Mayfield Cheetahs =

Australian rugby league club, based in Newcastle, NSW

Waratah-Mayfield
- Cheetah

Club information
- Full name: Waratah-Mayfield Cheetahs Rugby League Football Club
- Colours: Gold; Maroon
- Founded: 1927; 98 years ago
- Website: http://www.sportingpulse.com/club_info.cgi?c=7-2358-21234-0-0

Current details
- Ground: Waratah Oval, Waratah NSW
- Competition: Newcastle Rugby League

Records
- Premierships: 6 (1936, 1942, 1944, 1952, 1990, 2000)

Waratah Mayfield is a rugby league club based in the Newcastle, New South Wales region of Australia.

Known as The Cheetahs and wearing Maroon and Gold, they were a member of the First Grade Newcastle Rugby League until 2004 and now compete in Newcastle & Hunter Rugby League.

== History ==
Waratah Mayfield RLFC were founded in 1927 and entered the Newcastle Rugby League in 1928. Waratah were successful right from the start in the Newcastle First Grade in only their second year losing the grand final in the years 1929, 1933 and 1934, before finally tasting glory in 1936 when they beat Northern Suburbs in the grand final, the team they lost to in 1929.

In 1990, Waratah-Mayfield ended a 38-year drought when they defeated Lakes United 17–14 to win the Newcastle premiership. The next premiership came in 2000 when Waratah Mayfield faced off against Lakes United and again claimed victory taking out the grand final 20–14.

Leaner times were ahead for Waratah Mayfield, and in 2004 the club suffering from financial hardships and struggling to recruit enough players to take part in the Newcastle rugby league they were forced to withdraw from all senior competitions. Today the club continues in junior rugby league competitions and in the Newcastle & Hunter Rugby League competition.

== Premiership titles ==
Years Won
1936	1942	1944	1952	1990	2000

== Notable juniors ==
- (Australia) Ron Bailey
- Isaac Gordon
