= Tommy Ryan (rugby league) =

Australia international rugby league footballer (1930–2023)

Personal information
- Full name: Thomas Alfred Ryan
- Born: 9 May 1930 Bingara, New South Wales, Australia
- Died: 24 August 2023 (aged 93) Miranda, New South Wales, Australia

Playing information
- Position: Wing
Club
Years	Team	Pld	T	G	FG	P
1951–1953	St. George Dragons	42	29	0	0	87
1955	Rockhampton
1955–1958	St. George Dragons	52	52	0	0	156
	Total	94	81	0	0	243
Representative
Years	Team	Pld	T	G	FG	P
1952	City NSW	1	0	0	0	0
1952	Australia	4	4	0	0	12
1953	New South Wales	1	4	0	0	12
1955	Queensland	3	0	0	0	0
- Source: Whiticker/Hudson

Tommy Ryan (9 May 1930 – 24 August 2023) was an Australian representative rugby league footballer. A prolific try scorer, Ryan became a dual premiership winning player with the St. George Dragons and also represented New South Wales, Queensland and Australia.

== Early life ==
Originally from Inverell, New South Wales, Ryan attended St Joseph's College, Hunters Hill like his grandfather and father, sons and grandson. He played in the college's GPS premiership winning first XV of 1947 and rowed in the college's 1st VIII.

== Career ==
Ryan took up rugby league in the junior grades with Cronulla in 1949 and 1950 and began his first grade career with the St. George Dragons in 1951. By 1953, he represented New South Wales against the American 'All Stars' and was also picked for the Kangaroo tour. Tommy Ryan scored 24 tries in 20 matches whilst on tour with the 1952–53 Kangaroos and played in four test matches.

He is listed on the Australian Players Register as Kangaroo No. 299.

Tommy Ryan made his first Grand Final appearance for the Dragons in 1953. In 1954 he played one year in Temora before moving to Rockhampton Queensland in 1955 and represented the state before returning to the Dragons for the finals in 1955.

He later played in the 1956 and 1957 St. George Grand Final victories and was the NSWRFL competition's leading try scorer in 1956 (19 tries) and 1957 (26 tries, in just 19 matches); the latter standing as a St. George Dragons club record until 2001.

== After football ==
Ryan worked for a firm which built the Oil Refinery at Kurnell and later as a publican in hotels at Griffith, Cobar and Taree. Tommy Ryan is survived by his wife Anne, seven children and 22 grandchildren.
