= Brian Carlson =

Australia international rugby league footballer & coach

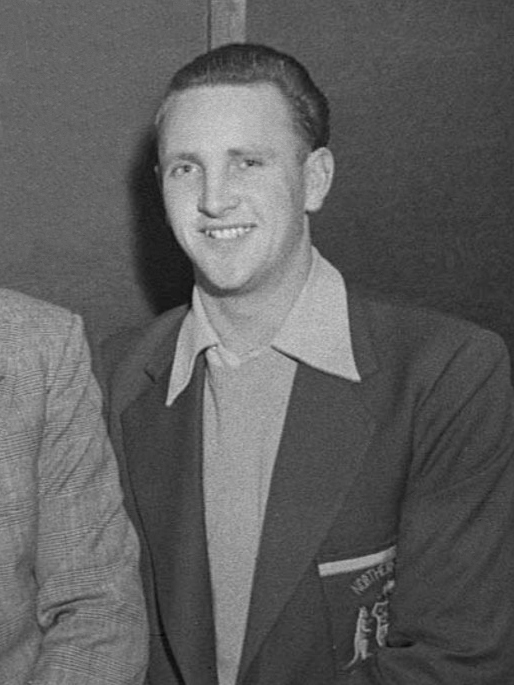
- Carlson in 1952

Personal information
- Born: 12 February 1933 Wyoming, New South Wales, Australia
- Died: 14 April 1987 (aged 54) Newcastle, New South Wales, Australia

Playing information
- Height: 5 ft 11 in (180 cm)
- Weight: 13 st 9 lb (87 kg)
- Position: Fullback, Centre, Wing
Club
Years	Team	Pld	T	G	FG	P
1951–54	Norths (Newcastle)
1956–57	Souths (Newcastle)
1957	Blackall
1957–62	North Sydney	74	31	211	0	515
	Total	74	31	211	0	515
Representative
Years	Team	Pld	T	G	FG	P
1951	Newcastle	1	1	0	0	3
1952–59	New South Wales	10	8	13		50
1957	Queensland	4	2	1	0	8
1952–61	Australia	17	10	5	0	40

Coaching information
Representative
Years	Team	Gms	W	D	L	W%
1961	Australia	2	1	0	1	50
1967–68	Country Firsts	2	1	0	1	50

Brian Patrick Carlson (12 February 1933 – 14 April 1987) was an Australian professional rugby league footballer who played in the 1950s and 1960s. He was a centre and utility back for the Australia national team. He played in 17 Tests and 6 World Cup games between 1952 and 1961, as captain on two occasions. He is considered one of the nation's finest footballers of the 20th century.

== Playing career ==
Carlson was a naturally gifted athlete raised in Newcastle, New South Wales. He represented at district junior cricket, played 1st Grade cricket with the Wickham club in Newcastle, and was also a surf lifesaving competitor. After playing rugby league at school he was graded by the Newcastle Rugby League's Norths club in 1951.

When the 1951 French rugby league tour of Australia and New Zealand saw the powerful France national team come through Newcastle, 18-year-old Carlson was selected to play for the Newcastle team against them.

In 1952 he scored two tries on representative debut for Country Firsts. He represented for New South Wales that same season against Queensland in the 2nd game of the interstate series, and then against the touring New Zealanders.

He was selected in the 1952–53 Kangaroo tour as a wing. He played in two Tests against England, one against France and in sixteen minor tour games. He was highest try-scorer on the tour returning with a tally of twenty-nine. In 1954 a rib injury rupturing his kidney threatened both his career and his life. He was close to death but recovered and sat out the 1955 season to recuperate. He returned to the field in 1956 and 1957 accepting positions as player-coach firstly with Souths Newcastle then with Blackall, Queensland.

He was selected in the 1957 World Cup squad despite not being contracted to a club, having left Blackall in dispute over a release. This return to representative rugby league at age 24 saw him rise to new heights. He played in three matches of the tournament, was top scorer with 28 points and named "Player of the 1957 World Cup". During the World Cup, Carlson also became the first Australian fullback to score a try in an international match when he scored in Australia's 26–9 win over France at the Sydney Cricket Ground (he also kicked 7 goals during the game). He also played in all three Tests in 1957 against the visiting Great Britain side.

Carlson signed a contract with the North Sydney Bears where he would stay for six years.

In 1959 Carlson played in the New South Wales loss to Queensland that attracted 35,261 spectators, smashing Brisbane's previous record for an interstate match of 22,817. He was then named Australian captain in the first Test of 1959 against New Zealand. He toured with the 1959–60 Kangaroos playing in 24 matches including two Tests and was the tour's second highest scorer behind Keith Barnes his selection rival for the fullback position.

He was the leading point scorer for Australia in the 1960 World Cup. His second honour as Australian captain came in the first Test of the 1961 tour of New Zealand. Keith Barnes was the Kangaroo captain for the 11 matches between Carlson's captaincy appearances.

Carlson captain North Sydney in the 1961 and 1962 NSWRFL seasons, the latter being his last in the premiership.

He returned to Newcastle's Souths club in 1963 as captain-coach for three seasons.

== Post-playing ==
After retiring from playing Carlson worked in Newcastle as a tally clerk on the wharves. He died in 1987.

In 2005 Carlson was inducted into the Australian Rugby League Hall of Fame. In August 2006 he was named at fullback in the North Sydney Bears' Team of the Century.

In 2007 Carlson was selected by a panel of experts as a winger in an Australian 'Team of the 50s'.

In February 2008, Carlson was named in the list of Australia's 100 Greatest Players (1908–2007) which was commissioned by the NRL and ARL to celebrate the code's centenary year in Australia.

In 2010 Carlson was named in a South Newcastle team of the century.

== Representative matches played ==
Team	Matches	Years
New South Wales	15	1952–1959
Queensland	4	1957
Australia	23	1952–1961

== Sources ==
- Brian Carlson at northsydneybears.com.au
- Whiticker, Alan (2004) Captaining the Kangaroos, New Holland, Sydney
- Andrews, Malcolm (2006) The ABC of Rugby League Austn Broadcasting Corpn, Sydney

Preceded by Brian Davies	Australian national rugby league captain 1959–61	Succeeded by Keith Barnes
