= Noel Pidding =

Australia international rugby league footballer

Personal information
- Full name: Noel Douglas Pidding
- Born: 13 July 1927 Maitland, New South Wales, Australia
- Died: 17 August 2013 (aged 86) Ingleburn, New South Wales, Australia

Playing information
- Height: 174 cm (5 ft 9 in)
- Weight: 86 kg (13 st 8 lb)
- Position: Fullback, Wing, Halfback
Club
Years	Team	Pld	T	G	FG	P
1947–53	St. George	104	34	248	0	598
1955–56	Eastern Suburbs	23	9	64	0	155
	Total	127	43	312	0	753
Representative
Years	Team	Pld	T	G	FG	P
1947–54	New South Wales	26	13	46	0	131
1948–54	Australia	16	6	53	0	124
1947–55	NSW City	6	6	23	0	64

Noel Pidding (13 July 1927 – 17 August 2013) was an Australian rugby league footballer. He was a state and national representative, whose goal-kicking prowess enabled him to set a number of long-standing club and Australian point scoring records. His club career was with the St. George Dragons, with whom he won the 1949 premiership, and later at Eastern Suburbs.

== Career ==
Pidding joined St. George in 1947, immediately cementing a spot in the top-grade as the club's full-back. He made his representative debut for New South Wales that year and in 1948 was selected for Australia, making his test debut against New Zealand in the first test at the Sydney Cricket Ground. He had a poor game in Australia's 19–21 loss and was unlucky enough to be starting his career at the same time as the "Immortal" Clive Churchill. Churchill replaced Pidding for the 2nd Test in Brisbane and went on to make thirty-seven national representative appearances at full-back over the next 10 years. Pidding was overlooked for the 1948-49 Kangaroo tour.

In 1949 Pidding moved to the wing and he played in that position in the Dragons' 1949 premiership victory over the South Sydney Rabbitohs, scoring two tries. The move to wing revitalised his representative career. He was selected in the 1950 City-Country match scoring an individual record 27 points (1 try and 12 goals) and regained Australian selection in that year's series against New Zealand. He was the first St George player to top 200 points in a club season (1951) and that same year represented nationally against France.

He toured New Zealand again in 1952 before being selected for the 1952-53 Kangaroo tour which marked his career highlight. He played in all five Tests of the tour plus in seventeen minor matches. He scored 228 points on tour, a record second only to Dave Brown's 285 of 1933-34 which was scored in ten more matches than Pidding's feat.

He made further Test appearances in 1953 (New Zealand) and in 1954 (Great Britain) where he set a then individual record for an Australian player in an Ashes Test with 19 points (1 try and 8 goals). His representative farewell was in the inaugural 1954 Rugby League World Cup in France where he played in all three of Australia's pool clashes. Pidding is listed on the Australian Players Register as Kangaroo No. 244.

He had left St George after the club's 1953 Grand Final loss to South Sydney. He spent the 1954 season in the country with Maitland before returning to Sydney for two final seasons with Eastern Suburbs 1955–56.

In 1957 Pidding played in the first season of the Manawatu Rugby League competition, playing for the Marton club.

== Death ==
Pidding died at the age of 86 on 17 August 2013 at a nursing home in New South Wales. In his last years he had suffered from dementia.
