= Ferris Ashton =

Australian RL coach and former Australia international rugby league footballer

Personal information
- Full name: Ferris Arthur Ashton
- Born: 21 August 1926; Sydney, New South Wales
- Died: 29 January 2013 (aged 86); Port Macquarie, New South Wales

Playing information
- Position: Second-row
Club
Years	Team	Pld	T	G	FG	P
1950–56	Eastern Suburbs	87	20	0	0	60
Representative
Years	Team	Pld	T	G	FG	P
1952	New South Wales	3	2	0	0	6
1952–53	Australia	8	2	0	0	8

Coaching information
Club
Years	Team	Gms	W	D	L	W%
1954	Eastern Suburbs	18	3	1	14	17
- Source: Whitiker/Hudson

Ferris Arthur Ashton (21 August 1926 – 29 January 2013) was an Australian rugby league footballer who represented his country in 8 test matches. Ferris was also a member of the Royal Australian Navy (RAN) during the Second World War.

== Club career ==
Ashton was born in Sydney, New South Wales, and began his rugby league career playing with the Bondi United club at a junior level. In 1950 the burly forward began his senior career with Eastern Suburbs. A loyal clubman, Ashton played 87 matches for Easts in the years (1950–56), captaining the side in many of those years and has now been made a life member of the club.

In 1951 he played for NSW before gaining selection for Australia the following year in the series against New Zealand. Ashton made a stunning debut giving the final pass for three tries. At the years end he was selected for the 1952/53 Kangaroo Tour. On tour he played in twenty-two matches including five tests. His final test appearance was in 1953 when he was Australias' sole try scorer in the side that was defeated by New Zealand.

== War service ==
During the Second World War, Ferris served on board the destroyer HMAS Quickmatch and served with the British Fleet in the Pacific Ocean. Ferris was also a very good boxer, taught by Major Francis O'Connor, having been undefeated in 19 amateur fights. He beat the best of the U.S. Navy when in Tokyo Harbour after the surrender. After the war, Ferris was on leave getting ready to go back to Japan when he slipped down some stairs, leading to a broken knee.

== Representative, coach and family ==
In July '52 he was selected for the Kangaroo tour and spent the next 8 months in England and France. The boat took 6 weeks to get there and 7 to get back. Ferris made the test team to tour N.Z. in 1953 and played his last test. He is listed on the Australian Players Register as Kangaroo No.289.

Ferris met Patty Brennan, Miss Bondi, in 1946 and married in 1950, Michael was born in 1951. Michelle was born in 1954, Kelly in 1955 and Greg in 1957.

In 1953 the American All Stars toured Australia with Ferris partnering Jack Gibson in the second-row for NSW.

He Captain-coached the Roosters in 1954 and finishing his career in 1957 when taking a job offer as safety manager for the Snowy Mountains Scheme. Ferris moved his family back to Sydney in 1962 settling on the Northern Beaches at Allambie Heights.

== Television personality ==
A former first grade cricketer with Waverley, Ashton was a wicketkeeper/batsman with 106 not out his highest score.

He was a regular on the Seven Network rugby league television program 'Controversy Corner' with Rex Mossop, Alan Clarkson, Col Pearce and Noel Kelly discussing pertinent Rugby League matters. The show ran for 19 years.

"From early days i was the keenest of Eastern Suburbs fans. Many, many times I sat on the hill at the sports ground and SCG and watched Easts in their red, white and blue. When I look back now I'm very, very proud of the fact that I never played with another club. They were my club."

– Ferris Ashton.

== Accolades ==
On 24 October 2000, Ashton was awarded the Australian Sports Medal for his rugby league achievements. The Ashton-Collier Medal is awarded to the 'man of the match' on the annual Anzac Day clash between Sydney Roosters and St George Illawarra Dragons, and the medal is co-named in the honour of Ferris Ashton and Bill Collier.

Ferris Ashton died on 29 January 2013.
