= 1954 Rugby League World Cup group stage =

1954 Rugby League World Cup group stage was the main component of the 1954 Rugby League World Cup, with the top two nations qualifying for the final. The group comprised Australia, New Zealand, Great Britain and France.

== Ladder ==
Pos	Team	Pld	W	D	L	PF	PA	PD	Pts	Qualification or relegation
1	Great Britain	3	2	1	0	67	32	+35	5	Advance to the Final
2	France	3	2	1	0	50	31	+19	5	Advance to the Final
3	Australia	3	1	0	2	52	58	−6	2	
4	New Zealand	3	0	0	3	34	82	−48	0	

Updated to match(es) played on 11 November 1954. Source: RugbyLeagueProject
Rules for classification: 1) points; 2) point difference; 3) number of points scored

== France vs New Zealand ==
France's niggling tactics in their win against New Zealand in the tournament's opening match drew criticism from the media and the Kiwis coach, Jim Amos. New Zealand winger Jimmy Edwards had the distinction of being the first scorer in World Cup history with a try after only five minutes. Puig-Aubert landed the first goal.

30 October

France	22–13	New Zealand
Tries: Jean Audoubert; Raymond Contrastin; Joseph Crespo; Guy Delaye; Goals: Puig Aubert (4); Drop goals: Puig Aubert	Report	Tries: Cyril Eastlake; Jimmy Edwards; Ron McKay; Goals: John Bond (2)

Parc des Princes, Paris
Attendance: 13,240
Referee: Charles Appleton (England)

France	New Zealand

FB	1	Puig Aubert (c)
RW	2	Raymond Contrastin
CE	3	Jacques Merquey
CE	4	Antoine Jimenez
LW	5	Vincent Cantoni
SO	6	Gilbert Benausse
SH	7	Claude Teisseire
PR	8	Joseph Krawzyck
HK	9	Jean Audoubert
PR	10	François Rinaldi
SR	11	Jean Pambrun
SR	12	Guy Delaye
LF	13	Joseph Crespo
Coach:
Jean Duhau and Rene Duffort

FB	1	Pat Creedy
RW	2	George Menzies
CE	3	Ron McKay
CE	4	Cyril Eastlake (c)
LW	5	Jimmy Edwards
FE	6	Bill Sorensen
HB	7	Len Eriksen
PR	8	Cliff Johnson
HK	9	Lory Blanchard
PR	10	Bill McLennan
SR	11	John Yates
SR	12	Don Robinson
LK	13	Alistair Atkinson
Coach:
Jim Amos

== Australia vs Great Britain ==
The British team proved too strong for Australia in both sides' first World Cup game.

31 October

Australia	13–28	Great Britain
Tries: Harry Wells (2); Ken Kearney; Goals: Noel Pidding (2)	Report	Tries: Gordon Brown (2); Phil Jackson (2); Frank Kitchen; David Rose; Goals: Jimmy Ledgard (5)

Stade de Gerland, Lyon
Attendance: 10,250
Referee: René Guidicelli (France)

Australia	Great Britain

FB	1	Clive Churchill (c)
RW	2	Noel Pidding
CE	3	Alex Watson
CE	4	Harry Wells
LW	5	Ian Moir
FE	6	Ken McCaffery
HB	7	Keith Holman
PR	8	Duncan Hall
HK	9	Ken Kearney
PR	10	Roy Bull
SR	11	Norm Provan
SR	12	Brian Davies
LK	13	Peter Diversi
Coach:
Victor Hey

FB	1	Jimmy Ledgard
RW	2	David Rose
CE	3	Phil Jackson
CE	4	Mick Sullivan
LW	5	Frank Kitchen
SO	6	Gordon Brown
SH	7	Gerry Helme
PR	8	John Thorley
HK	9	Sam Smith
PR	10	Bob Coverdale
SR	11	Basil Watts
SR	12	Don Robinson
LF	13	Dave Valentine (c)
Coach:
Gideon Shaw

== Australia vs New Zealand ==
Australia's victory in this match put them in third position on the ladder and New Zealand last.

7 November

Australia	34–15	New Zealand
Tries: Alex Watson (3); Roy Bull; Peter Diversi; Greg Hawick; Ken Kearney; Kel O'Shea; Goals: Noel Pidding (5)	Report	Tries: Lenny Eriksen; Goals: Ron McKay (6)

Stade Vélodrome, Marseille
Attendance: 20,000
Referee: René Guidicelli (France)

Australia	New Zealand

FB	1	Clive Churchill (c)
RW	2	Noel Pidding
CE	3	Harry Wells
CE	4	Alex Watson
LW	5	Denis Flannery
FE	6	Bob Banks
HB	7	Greg Hawick
PR	8	Roy Bull
HK	9	Ken Kearney
PR	10	Brian Davies
SR	11	Harold Crocker
SR	12	Kel O'Shea
LK	13	Peter Diversi
Coach:
Victor Hey

FB	1	Neville Denton
RW	2	Jimmy Edwards
CE	3	Cyril Eastlake (c)
CE	4	Ron McKay
LW	5	Jim Austin
FE	6	Bill Sorensen
HB	7	Lenny Eriksen
PR	8	Cliff Johnson
HK	9	Lory Blanchard
PR	10	Bill McLennan
SR	11	Jock Butterfield
SR	12	John Yates
LK	13	Alistair Atkinson
Coach:
Jim Amos

== France vs Great Britain ==
The game gripped the attention of the rugby league public as never before with a record crowd of 37,471 attending at Toulouse. That record crowd has still not been beaten in France. The draw resulted in Great Britain and France sharing the lead in the tournament.

7 November

France	13–13	Great Britain
Tries: Raymond Contrastin (2); Joseph Krawzyck; Goals: Puig Aubert (2)	Report	Tries: Gordon Brown; Gerry Helme; David Rose; Goals: Jimmy Ledgard (2)

Stadium Municipal, Toulouse
Attendance: 37,471
Referee: Charles Appleton (England)

France	Great Britain

FB	1	Puig Aubert (c)
RW	2	Raymond Contrastin
RC	3	Jacques Merquey
LC	4	Antoine Jimenez
LW	5	Vincent Cantoni
SO	6	Gilbert Benausse
SH	7	Joseph Crespo
PR	8	Joseph Krawzyck
HK	9	Jean Audoubert
PR	10	François Rinaldi
SR	11	Armand Save
SR	12	Jean Pambrun
LF	13	Gilbert Verdié
Coach:
Jean Duhau and Rene Duffort

FB	1	Jimmy Ledgard
RW	2	David Rose
RC	3	Phil Jackson
LC	4	Albert Naughton
LW	5	Mick Sullivan
SO	6	Gordon Brown
SH	7	Gerry Helme
PR	8	John Thorley
HK	9	Sam Smith
PR	10	Bob Coverdale
SR	11	Basil Watts
SR	12	Don Robinson
LF	13	Dave Valentine (c)
Coach:
Gideon Shaw

== France vs Australia ==
Australia and France were playing for the chance to meet Great Britain in the final.

11 November

France	15–5	Australia
Tries: Vincent Cantoni; Raymond Contrastin; Jacques Merquey; Goals: Puig Aubert (3)	Report	Tries: Kel O'Shea; Goals: Noel Pidding

Stade Marcel Saupin, Nantes
Attendance: 13,000
Referee: Charles Appleton (England)

France	Australia

FB	1	Puig Aubert (c)
RW	2	Vincent Cantoni
CE	3	Jacques Merquey
CE	4	Claude Teisseire
LW	5	Raymond Contrastin
SO	6	Antoine Jimenez
SH	7	Joseph Crespo
PR	8	François Rinaldi
HK	9	Jean Audoubert
PR	10	Joseph Krawzyck
SR	11	Guy Delaye
SR	12	Jean Pambrun
LF	13	Gilbert Verdié
Coach:
Jean Duhau and Rene Duffort

FB	1	Clive Churchill (c)
RW	2	Noel Pidding
CE	3	Alex Watson
CE	4	Greg Hawick
LW	5	Denis Flannery
FE	6	Bob Banks
HB	7	Keith Holman
PR	8	Roy Bull
HK	9	Ken Kearney
PR	10	Brian Davies
SR	11	Kel O'Shea
SR	12	Harold Crocker
LK	13	Peter Diversi
Coach:
Victor Hey

Mistakes cost the Australians the match, so France advanced to the World Cup tournament decider.

== Great Britain vs New Zealand ==
11 November

Great Britain	26–6	New Zealand
Tries: Frank Kitchen (2); Gordon Brown; Phil Jackson; Jimmy Ledgard; David Rose; Goals: Jimmy Ledgard (4)	Report	Goals: Ron McKay (3)

Stade Chaban Delmas, Bordeaux
Attendance: 14,000
Referee: René Guidicelli (France)

Great Britain	New Zealand

FB	1	Jimmy Ledgard
RW	2	David Rose
RC	3	Phil Jackson
LC	4	Mick Sullivan
LW	5	Frank Kitchen
SO	6	Gordon Brown
SH	7	Gerry Helme
PR	8	John Thorley
HK	9	Sam Smith
PR	10	Bob Coverdale
SR	11	Basil Watts
SR	12	Don Robinson
LF	13	Dave Valentine (c)
Coach:
Gideon Shaw

FB	1	Ian Grey
RW	2	Jimmy Edwards
CE	3	Cyril Eastlake (c)
CE	4	Ron McKay
LW	5	Jim Austin
FE	6	Bill Sorensen
HB	7	Lenny Eriksen
PR	8	Cliff Johnson
HK	9	Lory Blanchard
PR	10	Bill McLennan
SR	11	Jock Butterfield
SR	12	George McDonald
LK	13	Alistair Atkinson
Coach:
Jim Amos
