= 1954 Rugby League World Cup final =

France	Great Britain (United Kingdom)
(FFR XIII)	(RFL)
12	16
	1	2	Total
FRA	4	8	12
GBR	8	8	16
- Date: 13 November 1954
- Stadium: Parc des Princes
- Location: Paris, France
- Man of the Match: Don Robinson (Great Britain)
- Referee: Charles Appleton (Great Britain)
- Attendance: 30,368

Broadcast partners
- Broadcasters: BBC (United Kingdom)
- Commentators: Eddie Waring

The 1954 Rugby League World Cup final was the conclusive game of the 1954 Rugby League World Cup tournament and was played between France and Great Britain on 13 November 1954 at the Parc des Princes in Paris, France.

== Background ==
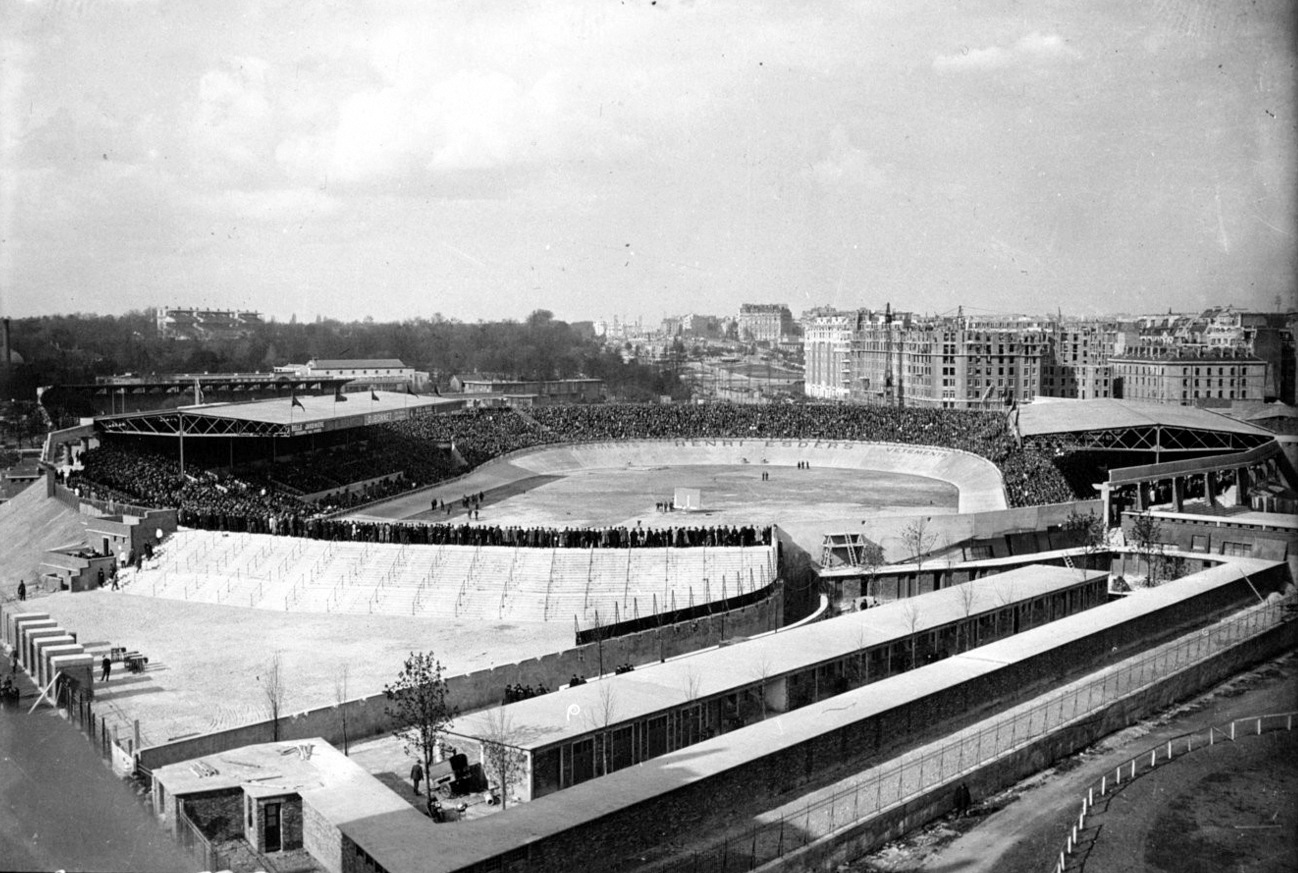
Parc des Princes, the venue of the inaugural Rugby League World Cup final

The 1954 Rugby League World Cup was the inaugural staging of the Rugby League World Cup. The tournament was held in France from 30 October, culminating in the final between France and Great Britain on 13 November.

=== France ===
Scores and results list France's points tally first.

Opposing Team	For	Against	Date	Venue	Attendance	Stage
New Zealand	22	13	30 October	Parc des Princes, Paris	13,240	Group Stage
Great Britain	13	13	7 November	Stadium Municipal, Toulouse	37,471	Group Stage
Australia	15	5	11 November	Stade Marcel Saupin, Nantes	13,000	Group Stage

=== Great Britain ===
Scores and results list Great Britain's points tally first.

Opposing Team	For	Against	Date	Venue	Attendance	Stage
Australia	28	13	31 October	Stade de Gerland, Lyon	10,250	Group Stage
France	13	13	7 November	Stadium Municipal, Toulouse	37,471	Group Stage
New Zealand	26	6	11 November	Stade Chaban Delmas, Bordeaux	14,000	Group Stage

== Match details ==
The BBC broadcast the whole match live in the UK via the Television Continental Exchange – a rare novelty for the time.

13 November 1954

France	12–16	Great Britain
Try: Raymond Contrastin; Vincent Cantoni Goals: Puig Aubert (3)		Try: Gordon Brown (2); Gerry Helme; David Rose; Goals: Jimmy Ledgard (2)

Parc des Princes, Paris
Attendance: 30,368
Referee: Charles Appleton (Great Britain)
Player of the Match: Don Robinson (Great Britain)

France	Great Britain

FB	1	Puig Aubert (c)
RW	2	Vincent Cantoni
RC	3	Claude Teisseire
LC	4	Jacques Merquey
LW	5	Raymond Contrastin
SO	6	Antoine Jimenez
SH	7	Joseph Crespo
PR	8	Joseph Krawzyck
HK	9	Jean Audoubert
PR	10	François Rinaldi
SR	11	Armand Save
SR	12	Jean Pambrun
LF	13	Gilbert Verdié
Coach:
(France) Jean Duhau and Rene Duffort

FB	1	Jimmy Ledgard
RW	2	David Rose
RC	3	Phil Jackson
LC	4	Albert Naughton
LW	5	Mick Sullivan
SO	6	Gordon Brown
SH	7	Gerry Helme
PR	8	John Thorley
HK	9	Sam Smith
PR	10	Bob Coverdale
SR	11	Basil Watts
SR	12	Don Robinson
LF	13	Dave Valentine (c)
Coach:
(England) Gideon Shaw

France opened the scoring with a penalty Puig-Aubert kick from 45 yards out and played well early in the match, leading early in the second half thanks to a brilliant try from Cantoni. However Great Britain did not waver, with credit for the win given to a starring role by centre Phil Jackson and the play of their forward pack, as well as the tough match France had played against Australia in Nantes two days earlier. Great Britain defeated France 16–12 and became the first team to lift the World Cup.
