= Leigh Sports Village =

Stadium in Leigh, Greater Manchester, England

- Sport Village or LSV
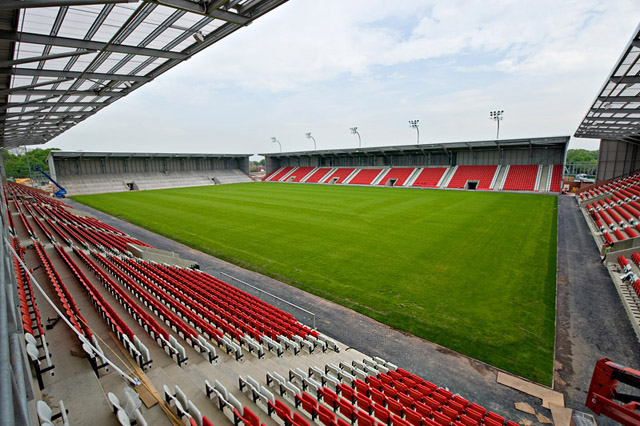
- Interior of the stadium, 2008
- Interactive map of Leigh Sports Village
- Location: Leigh, Greater Manchester, England WN7 4GX
- Coordinates: 53.491°N 2.529°W
- Owner: Leigh Sports Village Company Ltd; Wigan Metropolitan Borough Council
- Operator: Leigh Sports Village Company Ltd
- Capacity: 12,000
- Surface: Desso GrassMaster
- Record attendance: 12,005; Widnes Vikings vs Castleford Tigers; 10 August 2014

Construction
- Built: 2007–2008
- Opened: 28 December 2008
- Cost: £17.5m
- Main contractor: Hall Construction

Tenants
- Rugby League; Leigh Leopards (2008–present); Football; Leigh Genesis (2009–2010); Blackburn Rovers Reserves (2009–2015); Manchester United Reserves (2014–present); Manchester United Women (2018–present)

Leigh Sports Village (known as The Progress With Unity Stadium for sponsorship reasons) is a multi-use sports, retail and housing development in Leigh, Greater Manchester, England. The centrepiece of the development is a 12,000-capacity stadium which is home to professional rugby league team Leigh Leopards, the Manchester United Women's senior team, and Manchester United's men's Under-21 and Academy teams. The complex also plays host to amateur rugby league club Leigh East and amateur athletics club Leigh Harriers, who both occupy dedicated facilities on the site. Other facilities on site include the Leigh campus of Wigan and Leigh College, Leigh Sports Centre, which includes a gym, multi-use sports hall and swimming pool, a Holiday Inn Express hotel, a Morrisons supermarket and the Whistling Wren pub. During 2022, it hosted matches in the UEFA Women's Euro 2022.

== Background ==
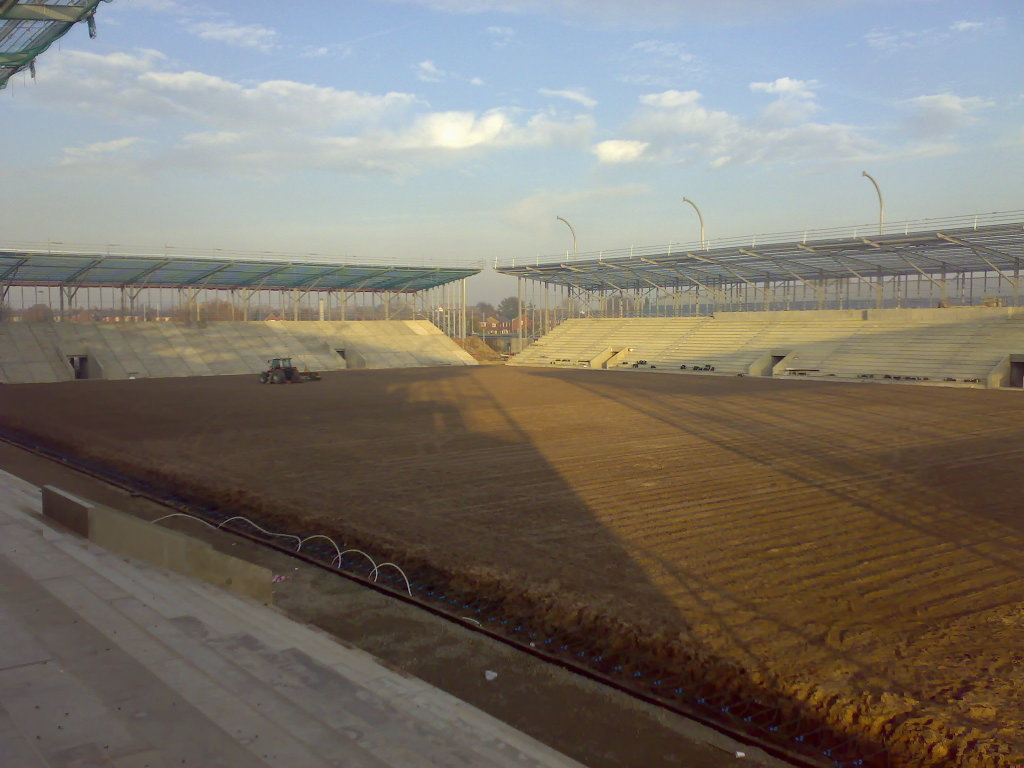
Construction of the Leigh Sports Village stadium

Leigh Sports Village is a development southwest of Leigh town centre, on the south side of the Leigh arm of the Leeds and Liverpool Canal, close to Pennington Flash Country Park and accessed from the A579, Atherleigh Way and by pedestrian routes from the town and surrounding area. It is also close to the A580 "East Lancashire Road". The scheme was initially developed to contribute to the regeneration of Leigh and provide modern facilities for local sports clubs, schools and the local community.

The main focus of the sports village is the stadium built for local professional sports clubs and its associated facilities. It is all seating in the West, East and South Stands with standing in the North Stand. There is a 25-metre swimming pool, gymnasia and activity rooms and a sports hall used by the sports clubs, college and the local community. A synthetic 400-metre (440 yd) running track, covered training facility and field sports area was built for Leigh Harriers and Athletic Club. Amateur rugby league club, Leigh East ARLFC has a clubhouse at the Leigh Sports Village Arena.

Leigh College occupy a site on the stadium perimeter and share sports and youth facilities. To make the project commercially viable, retail and commercial premises, housing and a hotel were built on the site close to Atherleigh Way.

Roads on the Sports Village site are named after three local sporting personalities: Tommy Sale, Jimmy Ledgard and Geoff Turner. The roads are Sale Way, home to the stadium, sixth form college and sports centre, Turner Way address of Leigh Harriers Athletics Club, whilst Ledgard Avenue accommodates the new Leigh East clubhouse.

== Stadium ==
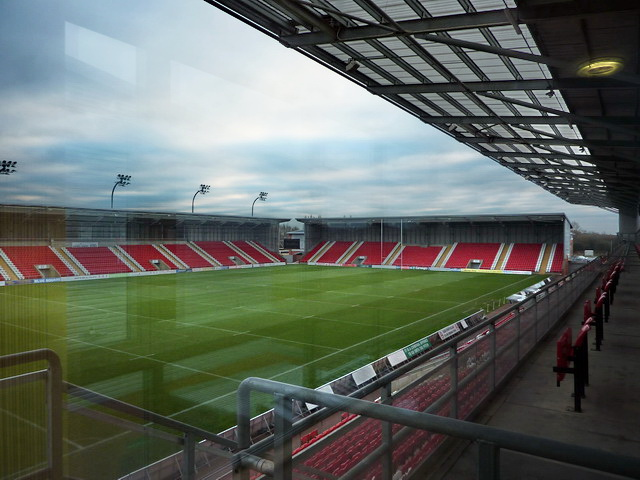
The stadium in rugby league set up

Two ramp-up events were held during December 2008 to fulfil safety certification requirements. A children's rugby league festival was held on 14 December 2008 as the first event, rescheduled from the previous week because of a frozen pitch. After a successful first event, the crowd capacity was set at 4,775. A sell-out crowd of 4,714 saw Leigh versus Salford on 28 December 2008.

Leigh Sports Village was officially opened on Thursday 21 May 2009, by Queen Elizabeth II and the Duke of Edinburgh.

Leigh Sports Village was included in the London 2012 Pre-Games Training Camp Guide. The facility was available for use by competing nations as a training camp before the London 2012 Olympic Games. Though officials negotiated with the Ukrainian Olympic team, no nation chose to base athletes at Leigh Sports Village.

On 27 July 2013, the stadium staged its first Rugby League Challenge Cup semi-final between Wigan and London Broncos.

On Tuesday 5 November, the stadium hosted the Rugby League World Cup 2013 Tonga versus Cook Islands tie, which was won by Tonga 22–16 in front of a then stadium record crowd of 10,544. This attendance was surpassed on Sunday 11 August when the semi-final of the Challenge Cup saw an attendance of 12,005 witness Castleford defeat Widnes 28–6.

On Saturday 21 June 2014, Sir Elton John and his band played in front of 17,000 fans in one of only three announced UK venues for his Follow the Yellow Brick Road Tour.

In October 2015, England took on France in a warm-up match before their end-of-year test series against New Zealand.

== Internationals ==
=== Football ===
The stadium was one of the ten venues used to host matches at the UEFA Women's Euro 2022. It was used to host Group C matches, alongside Bramall Lane, and a quarter-final.

Date	Team 1	Result	Team 2	Attendance	Competition
9 July 2022	Portugal	2–2	Switzerland	5,902	UEFA Women's Euro 2022 Group C
13 July 2022	Netherlands	3–2	Portugal	6,966	UEFA Women's Euro 2022 Group C
17 July 2022	Sweden	5–0	Portugal	7,118	UEFA Women's Euro 2022 Group C
22 July 2022	Sweden	1–0	Belgium	7,517	UEFA Women's Euro 2022 Quarter Final

=== Rugby league ===
The Leigh Sports Village has hosted four England internationals, in addition to hosting a further five test matches not featuring England.

The first two non-England matches were part of the 2013 and 2017 Rugby League World Cup. The 2013 game was part of the competition proper and was an inter-group match between Tonga and Cook Islands on 5 November 2013. The game saw 10,554 in attendance, and Tonga won 22–16. The 2017 game was part of the qualifying stages. The match was between Italy and Russia on Friday 4 November 2016, with the winner securing the 14th and final berth in the tournament in Australasia. Four hundred and fifty people were in attendance as Italy took the final World Cup spot with a 76–0 hammering.

Leigh Sports Village also hosted three group games in the 2021 Rugby League World Cup, held in 2022.

Date	Team 1	Result	Team 2	Attendance	Competition
12 June 2010	England	60–6	France	7,951	Test match
29 October 2011	England	42–4	France	10,377	2011 Four Nations
5 November 2013	Tonga	22–16	Cook Islands	10,554	2013 Rugby League World Cup
24 October 2015	England	84–4	France	8,380	Test match
4 November 2016	Italy	76–0	Russia	450	2017 Rugby League World Cup qualifying
17 October 2018	England	44–6	France	5,144	Test match
19 October 2022	Wales	12–18	Cook Islands	6,188	2021 Rugby League World Cup
23 October 2022	Lebanon	34–14	Ireland	6,057	2021 Rugby League World Cup
30 October 2022	Lebanon	74–12	Jamaica	5,006	2021 Rugby League World Cup

== Facilities ==
Facilities available at Leigh Sports Village include:

- A multi-use 12,000-capacity outdoor stadium with Desso GrassMaster pitch and under-pitch heating
- Four hospitality suites and 22 corporate boxes
- Leigh Indoor Sports Centre – A gymnasium, nine-court sports hall and 25 m (82 ft) six-lane swimming pool
- A 400-metre running track with a 60 m (200 ft) covered sprinting facility and clubhouse
- Multi-use floodlit 3rd-generation artificial and grass pitches
- Sports pavilion

== Site users and tenants ==
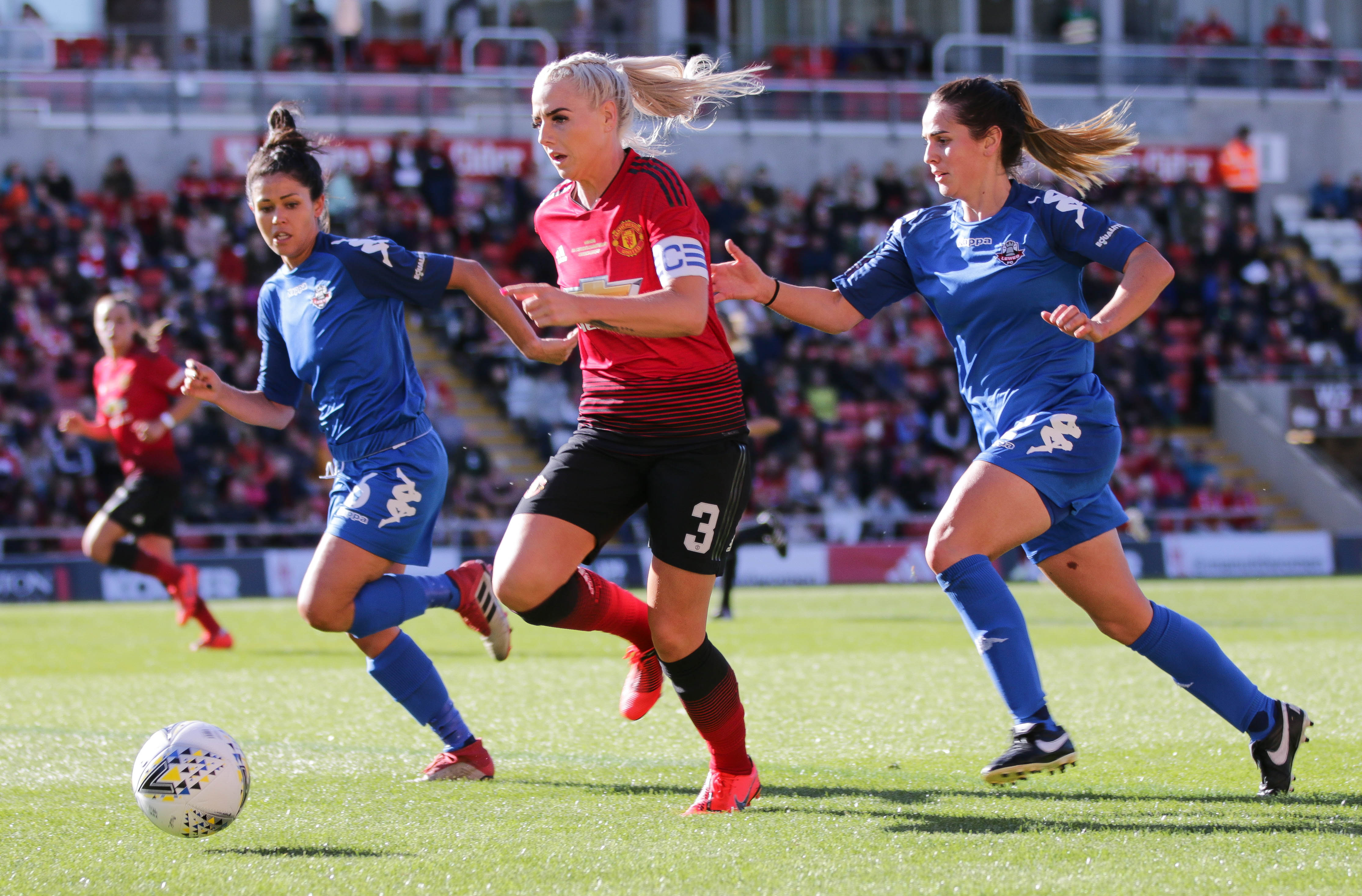
A Manchester United Women game being played at the Leigh Sports Village

The site is operated by Leigh Sports Village Company on behalf of Wigan Council – owners of the stadium, athletic stadium and clubhouse, swimming pool and sports centre, rugby league clubhouse and 3G pitches. Wigan Leisure and Culture Trust operate Leigh Indoor Sports Centre. Along with the general public, use of artificial and grass pitches, sports hall, gymnasium and swimming pool, the Leigh Sports Village site has several long-term tenants.

- Leigh Leopards rugby league club are tenants at the stadium.
- Leigh Harriers Athletic Club are tenants of the athletics facilities.
- BGAM Hospitality are the owners and operators of the Holiday Inn Express hotel, sold in 2014 by previous owners Park Inn. BGAM Hospitality purchased the hotel in June 2018.
- Leigh Athletic Football Club. Plays all their home games at the Leigh Harriers
- Manchester United Reserves play most home games there as of the 2014–15 season.
- Manchester United Women play most of their home games at the LSV.

== See also ==
- Murder of Lisa Hession, event that occurred only a few hundred meters/yards from the site of the stadium
