= Albert Naughton =

GB & England international rugby league footballer

Personal information
- Full name: Albert Naughton
- Born: 19 January 1929 Prescot, Merseyside, England
- Died: 27 September 2013 (aged 84) Onchan, Isle of Man

Playing information
- Height: 6 ft 0 in (183 cm)
- Weight: 12 st 6 lb (79 kg)
- Position: Centre, Loose forward
Club
Years	Team	Pld	T	G	FG	P
1946/47–49	Widnes	95	21	1	0	65
1949–61	Warrington	348	167	0	0	501
	Total	443	188	1	0	566
Representative
Years	Team	Pld	T	G	FG	P
1949–53	Lancashire	7	3	0	0	9
1953–56	England	3	0	0	0	0
1954	Great Britain	2	0	0	0	0
- Relatives: Danny Naughton (brother)

Albert Naughton (19 January 1929 – 27 September 2013), also known by the nickname of "Ally", was an English World Cup winning professional rugby league footballer who played as a centre or loose forward in the 1940s, 1950s and 1960s.

He played at representative level for Great Britain, England and Lancashire, and at club level for Widnes and Warrington (captain).

== Background ==
Naughton's birth was registered in Prescot district, Lancashire, England. He retired to live in the Isle of Man, and he died aged 84 in Onchan, Isle of Man.

== Playing career ==
=== Club career ===
Naughton became the most expensive player in rugby league when he left Widnes for Warrington for £4,600 during the 1949–50 season, based on increases in average earnings, this would be approximately £396,900 in 2016), he made his début for the Warrington in a friendly match in France, before making his competitive début, and scoring a try in the 17-0 victory over Whitehaven at Wilderspool Stadium.

Naughton played in Warrington's 11-26 defeat by Workington Town in the Championship Final during the 1950–51 season, the 7-3 victory over Oldham in the Championship Final during the 1954–55 season at Maine Road on Saturday 14 May 1955, and played loose forward in the 10-25 defeat by Leeds in the Championship Final during the 1960–61 season at Odsal Stadium, Bradford, this was also his last match for Warrington.

Naughton played at centre in Warrington's 19-0 victory over Widnes in the 1949–50 Challenge Cup Final during the 1949–50 season at Wembley Stadium, London on Saturday 6 May 1950, in front of a crowd of 94,249, but was injured with an aggravated calf injury for both the 4-4 draw with Halifax in the 1953–54 Challenge Cup Final during the 1953–54 season at Wembley Stadium, London on Saturday 1 May 1954, and the 18-4 victory in the 1953–54 Challenge Cup Final replay during the 1953–54 season at Odsal Stadium, Bradford on Wednesday 5 May 1954 in front of a 102,569+ crowd, he was replaced by a young Jim Challinor.

Naughton was on the winning side against his older brother John "Johnny" Naughton, the Widnes second-row, in the Challenge Cup Final during the 1949–50 season.

Naughton played at centre, and scored a try in Warrington's 5-28 defeat by Wigan in the 1950–51 Lancashire Cup Final during the 1950–51 season at Station Road, Swinton on Saturday 4 November 1950, and played in the 5-4 victory over St. Helens in the 1959–60 Lancashire Cup Final during the 1954–55 season at Central Park, Wigan on Saturday 31 October 1959.

=== International honours ===
Naughton won caps for England while at Warrington in 1953 against France (2 matches), in 1956 against France, and won caps for Great Britain while at Warrington in the 1954 Rugby League World Cup against France (2 matches).

Naughton played at centre in Great Britain's 13-13 draw with France in the 1954 Rugby League World Cup second group match at Stade Municipal, Toulouse on Sunday 7 November 1954, and Great Britain's 16-12 victory over France in the 1954 Rugby League World Cup Final at Parc des Princes, Paris on Saturday 13 November 1954.

Mick Sullivan moved from centre to replace Frank Kitchen on the wing for Great Britain's 13-13 draw with France in the 1954 Rugby League World Cup second group match at Stade Municipal, Toulouse on Sunday 7 November 1954, and Great Britain's 16-12 victory over France in the 1954 Rugby League World Cup Final at Parc des Princes, Paris on Saturday 13 November 1954, with Ally Naughton replacing Mick Sullivan at centre.

Naughton also represented Great Britain while at Warrington between 1952 and 1956 against France (2 non-Test matches).

== Honoured at Warrington Wolves ==
Naughton was inducted into the Warrington Wolves Hall of Fame in 2006 alongside Parry Gordon and George Thomas.

== Personal life ==
Albert Naughton was the younger brother of the rugby league second-row who played in the 1940s and 1950s for Widnes; John "Johnny" Naughton, and rugby league footballer, Daniel "Danny" Naughton.

== Outside of rugby league ==
Naughton took over from Harry Bath as landlord of the Britannia Inn, Scotland Road, Warrington during February 1957.

Achievements
Preceded by Jimmy Ledgard	Rugby league transfer record Widnes to Warrington; 1949–1950	Succeeded by Joe Egan
