= Australia at the Rugby League World Cup =

Australia have competed in every edition of the Rugby League World Cup. They have won 13 out of 17 times and have finished as runners-up on three other occasions. At every tournament, they automatically gain qualification.

== Tournament results ==
World Cup Record
Year	Round	Position	Pld	Win	Draw	Loss
(France) 1954	Group	3rd out of 4	3	1	0	2
(Australia) 1957	Winners	1st out of 4	3	3	0	0
(England) 1960	Group	2nd out of 4	3	2	0	1
(Australia) (New Zealand) 1968	Winners	1st out of 4	4	4	0	0
(England) 1970	Winners	1st out of 4	4	2	0	2
(France) 1972	Group	2nd out of 4	4	2	0	2
1975	Winners	1st out of 5	9	7	1	1
(Australia) (New Zealand) 1977	Winners	1st out of 4	4	4	0	0
1985-88	Winners	1st out of 5	8	6	0	2
1989-92	Winners	1st out of 5	9	9	0	0
(England) 1995	Winners	1st out of 10	5	4	0	1
(United Kingdom) (Ireland) (France) 2000	Winners	1st out of 16	6	6	0	0
(Australia) 2008	Final	2nd out of 10	5	4	0	1
(England) (Wales) 2013	Winners	1st out of 14	6	6	0	0
(Australia) (New Zealand) (Papua New Guinea) 2017	Winners	1st out of 14	6	6	0	0
(England) 2021	Winners	1st out of 16	6	6	0	0
(Australia) (New Zealand) (Papua New Guinea) 2026	Winners	1st out of 10	5	5	0	0

== Tournaments ==
Key
Colour	Meaning
	Winners
	Qualifiers to the next round

=== 1954 ===
Pos	Team	Pld	W	D	L	PF	PA	PD	Pts	Qualification or relegation
1	Great Britain	3	2	1	0	67	32	+35	5	Advance to the Final
2	France	3	2	1	0	50	31	+19	5	Advance to the Final
3	Australia	3	1	0	2	52	58	−6	2	
4	New Zealand	3	0	0	3	34	82	−48	0	

Updated to match(es) played on 11 November 1954. Source: RugbyLeagueProject
Rules for classification: 1) points; 2) point difference; 3) number of points scored

Round	Score	Opposition	Venue
Group Stage	13–28	Great Britain	Parc des Princes, Paris
Group Stage	34–15	New Zealand	Stade Vélodrome, Marseille
Group Stage	5–15	France	Stade Marcel Saupin, Nantes

=== 1957 ===
Team	Pld	W	D	L	PF	PA	PD	Pts	Result
Australia	3	3	0	0	82	20	+62	6	World Cup Winners
Great Britain	3	1	0	2	50	65	−15	2	
New Zealand	3	1	0	2	44	60	−16	2	
France	3	1	0	2	28	59	−31	2	

Round	Score	Opposition	Venue
Group Stage	25–5	New Zealand	Brisbane Cricket Ground, Brisbane
Group Stage	31–6	Great Britain	Sydney Cricket Ground, Sydney
Group Stage	26–9	France	Sydney Cricket Ground, Sydney

=== 1960 ===
Team	Pld	W	D	L	PF	PA	PD	Pts	Result
Great Britain	3	3	0	0	66	18	+48	6	World Cup Winners
Australia	3	2	0	1	37	37	0	4	
New Zealand	3	1	0	2	32	44	−12	2	
France	3	0	0	3	19	55	−36	0	

Round	Score	Opposition	Venue
Group Stage	13–12	France	Central Park, Wigan
Group Stage	21–15	New Zealand	Headingley, Leeds
Group Stage	10–3	Great Britain	Odsal Stadium, Bradford

=== 1968 ===
Team	Pld	W	D	L	PF	PA	PD	Pts	Qualification
Australia	3	3	0	0	93	26	+67	6	Qualified for the World Cup final
France	3	2	0	1	26	49	−23	4	Qualified for the World Cup final
Great Britain	3	1	0	2	50	46	+4	2	
New Zealand	3	0	0	3	36	84	−48	0	

Round	Score	Opposition	Venue
Group Stage	25–10	Great Britain	Sydney Cricket Ground, Sydney
Group Stage	31–12	New Zealand	Lang Park, Brisbane
Group Stage	37–4	France	Lang Park, Brisbane
Final	20–2	France	Sydney Cricket Ground, Sydney

=== 1970 ===
Team	Pld	W	D	L	PF	PA	PD	Pts	Qualification
Great Britain	3	3	0	0	44	21	+23	6	Qualified for the World Cup final
Australia	3	1	0	2	66	39	+27	2	Qualified for the World Cup final
France	3	1	0	2	32	37	−5	2	
New Zealand	3	1	0	2	44	89	−45	2	

Round	Score	Opposition	Venue
Group Stage	47–11	New Zealand	Central Park, Wigan
Group Stage	4–11	Great Britain	Headingley, Leeds
Group Stage	15–17	France	Odsal Stadium, Bradford
Final	12–7	Great Britain	Headingley, Leeds

=== 1972 ===
Team	Pld	W	D	L	PF	PA	PD	Pts	Qualification
Great Britain	3	3	0	0	93	44	+49	6	Advances to the Final
Australia	3	2	0	1	61	41	+20	4	Advances to the Final
France	3	1	0	2	33	53	−20	2	
New Zealand	3	0	0	3	33	82	−49	0	

Round	Score	Opposition	Venue
Group Stage	21–27	Great Britain	Stade Gilbert Brutus, Perpignan
Group Stage	9–5	New Zealand	Parc des Princes, Paris
Group Stage	31–9	France	Stadium Municipal, Toulouse
Final	10–10	Great Britain	Stade de Gerland, Lyon

=== 1975 ===
Team	Pld	W	D	L	PF	PA	PD	Pts
Australia	8	6	1	1	198	69	+129	13
England	8	5	2	1	167	84	+83	12
Wales	8	3	0	5	110	130	−20	6
New Zealand	8	2	2	4	121	149	−28	6
France	8	1	1	6	40	204	−164	3

Round	Score	Opposition	Venue
Group Stage	36–8	New Zealand	Lang Park, Brisbane
Group Stage	30–13	Wales	Sydney Cricket Ground, Sydney
Group Stage	26–6	France	Lang Park, Brisbane
Group Stage	10–10	England	Sydney Cricket Ground, Sydney
Group Stage	24–8	New Zealand	Carlaw Park, Auckland
Group Stage	18–6	Wales	St. Helen's Rugby Ground, Swansea
Group Stage	41–2	France	Stade Gilbert Brutus, Perpignan
Group Stage	13–16	England	Central Park, Wigan
Challenge Match	25–0	England	Headingley, Leeds

=== 1977 ===
Team	Pld	W	D	L	PF	PA	PD	Pts	Qualification
Australia	3	3	0	0	67	26	+41	6	Advances to the Final
Great Britain	3	2	0	1	58	35	+23	4	Advances to the Final
New Zealand	3	1	0	2	52	77	−25	2	
France	3	0	0	3	33	72	−39	0	

Round	Score	Opposition	Venue
Group Stage	27–12	New Zealand	Carlaw Park, Auckland
Group Stage	21–9	France	Sydney Cricket Ground, Sydney
Group Stage	19–5	Great Britain	Lang Park, Brisbane
Final	13–12	Great Britain	Sydney Cricket Ground, Sydney

=== 1985–1988 ===
Team	Pld	W	D	L	PF	PA	PD	Pts	Qualification
Australia	8	6	0	2	252	91	+161	12 (Note: France's 1987 away fixtures against Australia, New Zealand and Papua New Guinea were scratched and each team awarded two points as the French were unable to tour Australasia that year due to financial difficulties.)	Qualified for the World Cup final
New Zealand	8	5	1	2	158	86	+72	11	Qualified for the World Cup final
Great Britain	8	4	2	2	203	90	+113	10	
Papua New Guinea	8	2	0	6	84	325	−241	4	
France	8	1	1	6	35	140	−105	3	

Notes:

Round	Score	Opposition	Venue
Group Stage	0–18	New Zealand	Carlaw Park, Auckland
Group Stage	32–12	New Zealand	Lang Park, Brisbane
Group Stage	62–12	Papua New Guinea	Lloyd Robson Oval, Port Moresby
Group Stage	24–15	Great Britain	Central Park, Wigan
Group Stage	52–0	France	Stade Albert Domec, Carcassonne
Group Stage	26–12	Great Britain	Sydney Football Stadium, Sydney
Group Stage	70–8	Papua New Guinea	Eric Weissel Oval, Wagga Wagga
Final	25–12	New Zealand	Eden Park, Auckland

=== 1989–1992 ===
Team	Pld	W	D	L	PF	PA	PD	Pts	Qualification
Australia	8	8	0	0	236	68	+168	16	Advances to the Final
Great Britain	8	5	0	3	215	79	+136	10	Advances to the Final
New Zealand	8	5	0	3	203	120	+83	10	
France	8	2	0	6	80	247	−167	4	
Papua New Guinea	8	0	0	8	84	304	−220	0	

Source: RLWC2013

Round	Score	Opposition	Venue
Group Stage	22–14	New Zealand	Mount Smart Stadium, Auckland
Group Stage	34–2	France	Pioneer Oval, Parkes
Group Stage	14–0	Great Britain	Elland Road, Leeds
Group Stage	34–10	France	Stade Gilbert Brutus, Perpignan
Group Stage	40–12	New Zealand	Lang Park, Brisbane
Group Stage	40–6	Papua New Guinea	Lloyd Robson Oval, Port Moresby
Group Stage	16–10	Great Britain	Lang Park, Brisbane
Group Stage	36–14	Papua New Guinea	Townsville Sports Reserve, Townsville
Final	10–6	Great Britain	Wembley Stadium, London

=== 1995 ===
Team	Pld	W	D	L	PF	PA	PD	Pts	Qualification
England	3	3	0	0	112	16	+96	6	Advances to knockout stage
Australia	3	2	0	1	168	26	+142	4	Advances to knockout stage
Fiji	3	1	0	2	52	118	−66	2	
South Africa	3	0	0	3	12	184	−172	0	

Round	Score	Opposition	Venue
Group Stage	16–20	England	Wembley Stadium, London
Group Stage	86–6	South Africa	Gateshead International Stadium, Gateshead
Group Stage	66–0	Fiji	Kirklees Stadium, Huddersfield
Semi-Final	30–20	New Zealand	Kirklees Stadium, Huddersfield
Final	16–8	England	Wembley Stadium, London

=== 2000 ===
Pos	Team	Pld	W	D	L	PF	PA	PD	Pts	Qualification
1	Australia	3	3	0	0	198	14	+184	6	Advance to knockout stage
2	England	3	2	0	1	144	36	+108	4	Advance to knockout stage
3	Fiji	3	1	0	2	56	144	−88	2	
4	Russia	3	0	0	3	20	224	−204	0	

Source: Rugby League Project

Round	Score	Opposition	Venue
Group Stage	22–2	England	Twickenham Stadium, London
Group Stage	66–8	Fiji	Gateshead International Stadium, Gateshead
Group Stage	110–4	Russia	The Boulevard, Hull
Quarter-Final	66–10	Samoa	Vicarage Road, Watford
Semi-Final	46–22	Wales	Kirklees Stadium, Huddersfield
Final	40–12	New Zealand	Old Trafford, Manchester

=== 2008 ===
Pos	Team	Pld	W	D	L	PF	PA	PD	Pts	Qualification
1	Australia (H)	3	3	0	0	128	16	+112	6	Advance to knockout stage
2	New Zealand	3	2	0	1	90	60	+30	4	Advance to knockout stage
3	England	3	1	0	2	60	110	−50	2	Advance to knockout stage
4	Papua New Guinea	3	0	0	3	34	126	−92	0	

(H) Hosts

Round	Score	Opposition	Venue
Group Stage	30–6	New Zealand	Sydney Football Stadium, Sydney
Group Stage	52–4	England	Docklands Stadium, Melbourne
Group Stage	46–6	Papua New Guinea	Willows Sports Complex, Townsville
Semi-Final	52–0	Fiji	Sydney Football Stadium, Sydney
Final	20–34	New Zealand	Lang Park, Brisbane

=== 2013 ===
Team	Pld	W	D	L	TF	PF	PA	+/−	Pts
Australia	3	3	0	0	20	112	22	+90	6
England	3	2	0	1	18	96	40	+56	4
Fiji	3	1	0	2	8	46	82	–36	2
Ireland	3	0	0	3	3	14	124	–110	0

Round	Score	Opposition	Venue
Group Stage	28–20	England	Millennium Stadium, Cardiff
Group Stage	34–2	Fiji	Langtree Park, St Helens
Group Stage	50–0	Ireland	Thomond Park, Limerick
Quarter-Final	62–0	United States	Racecourse Ground, Wrexham
Semi-Final	64–0	Fiji	Wembley Stadium, London
Final	34–2	New Zealand	Old Trafford, Manchester

=== 2017 ===
Pos	Team	Pld	W	D	L	PF	PA	PD	Pts	Qualification
1	Australia (H)	3	3	0	0	104	10	+94	6	Advance to knockout stage
2	England	3	2	0	1	69	34	+35	4	Advance to knockout stage
3	Lebanon	3	1	0	2	39	81	−42	2	Advance to knockout stage
4	France	3	0	0	3	30	117	−87	0	

(H) Hosts

Round	Score	Opposition	Venue
Group Stage	18–4	England	Melbourne Rectangular Stadium, Melbourne
Group Stage	52–6	France	Canberra Stadium, Canberra
Group Stage	34–0	Lebanon	Sydney Football Stadium, Sydney
Quarter-Final	46–0	Samoa	Darwin Stadium, Darwin
Semi-Final	54–6	Fiji	Lang Park, Brisbane
Final	6–0	England	Lang Park, Brisbane

=== 2021 ===
Pos	Team	Pld	W	D	L	PF	PA	PD	Pts	Qualification
1	Australia	3	3	0	0	192	14	+178	6	Advance to knockout stage
2	Fiji	3	2	0	1	98	60	+38	4	Advance to knockout stage
3	Italy	3	1	0	2	38	130	−92	2	
4	Scotland	3	0	0	3	18	142	−124	0	

Source: rlwc2021

Round	Score	Opposition	Venue
Group Stage	42–8	Fiji	KCOM Stadium, Hull
Group Stage	84–0	Scotland	Ricoh Arena, Coventry
Group Stage	66–6	Italy	Totally Wicked Stadium, St Helens
Quarter-Final	48–4	Lebanon	John Smiths Stadium, Huddersfield
Semi-Final	16–14	New Zealand	Elland Road, Leeds
Final	30–10	Samoa	Old Trafford, Manchester

=== 2026 ===
Pos	Team	Pld	W	D	L	PF	PA	PD	Pts	Qualification
1	Australia (H)	3	3	0	0	126	50	+76	6	Advance to knockout stage
2	New Zealand (H)	3	2	0	1	182	40	+142	4	Advance to knockout stage
3	Fiji	3	1	0	2	62	126	−64	2	
4	Cook Islands	3	0	0	3	34	188	−154	0	

Source: Source
Rules for classification: Pool stage tiebreakers
(H) Hosts

Round	Score	Opposition	Venue
Group Stage	24–22	New Zealand	Allianz Stadium, Sydney
Group Stage	36–22	Fiji	Suncorp Stadium, Brisbane
Group Stage	66–6	Cook Islands	Queensland Country Bank Stadium, Townsville
Semi-Final	44–12	Samoa	Allianz Stadium, Sydney
Final	32–12	New Zealand	Suncorp Stadium, Brisbane
