= 1953–54 Northern Rugby Football League season =

- League: Northern Rugby Football League
- Champions: Warrington
- League Leaders: Halifax
- Top point-scorer: Peter Metcalfe 369
- Top try-scorer: Brian Bevan 67

The 1953–54 Rugby Football League season was the 59th season of rugby league football played in England. The championship, which involved thirty teams, started in August, 1953 and culminated in a finals play-off series in April, 1954 which resulted in a championship final between Warrington and Halifax. The season was also punctuated by the 1954 Rugby League World Cup, the first ever, and is also notable for its Challenge Cup final, which was drawn and had to be re-played, attracting a world record crowd for a rugby football match of either code.

== Season summary ==
The 1953–54 season saw Brian Bevan become the highest try scorer in rugby league history when he passed the 446 tries mark set by Alf Ellaby.

- League Champions: Warrington (8-7 v Halifax)
- Challenge Cup Winners: Warrington (8-4 v Halifax in replay after 4–4 draw)

Warrington won the Lancashire League, and Halifax won the Yorkshire League.

One oddity of the season was that Double winners Warrington, who only lost 5 league games, were beaten by both the bottom Lancashire club, Liverpool City and the bottom Yorkshire club, Hull Kingston Rovers.

== Championship ==
=== Ladder ===
	Club	P	W	D	L	PF	PA	D	Pts
1	Halifax	36	30	2	4	538	219	+319	62
2	Warrington	36	30	1	5	663	311	+352	61
3	St. Helens	36	28	2	6	672	297	+375	58
4	Workington Town	36	29	0	7	604	333	+271	58
5	Hull	36	25	0	11	685	349	+336	50
6	Huddersfield	36	24	0	12	689	417	+272	48
7	Wigan	36	23	1	12	688	392	+296	47
8	Barrow	36	23	0	13	574	377	+197	46
9	Bradford Northern	36	22	0	14	628	414	+214	44
10	Leeds	36	22	0	14	766	517	+249	44
11	Wakefield Trinity	36	19	1	16	671	508	+163	39
12	Oldham	36	17	4	15	504	366	+138	38
13	Leigh	36	19	0	17	547	459	+88	38
14	Featherstone Rovers	36	18	2	16	478	431	+47	38
15	Hunslet	36	19	0	17	455	451	+4	38
16	Widnes	36	16	3	17	420	431	-11	35
17	York	36	17	0	19	412	401	+11	34
18	Keighley	36	15	3	18	473	533	-60	33
19	Rochdale Hornets	36	14	3	19	404	457	-53	31
20	Dewsbury	36	14	3	19	432	508	-76	31
21	Whitehaven	36	14	1	21	362	544	-182	29
22	Salford	36	13	2	21	370	438	-68	28
23	Swinton	36	13	1	22	341	513	-172	27
24	Batley	36	13	1	22	367	658	-291	27
25	Bramley	36	11	3	22	437	746	-309	25
26	Castleford	36	11	1	24	437	728	-291	23
27	Belle Vue Rangers	36	7	2	27	307	714	-407	16
28	Doncaster	36	5	2	29	340	840	-500	12
29	Hull Kingston Rovers	36	5	2	29	298	737	-439	12
30	Liverpool City	36	4	0	32	304	777	-473	8

=== Play-offs ===
==== Semi-finals ====
- Halifax 18, Workington Town 7.
- Warrington 11, St Helens 0.

==== Final ====
The Championship Final was played between Warrington and Halifax on 8 May (three days after the epic Challenge Cup re-play) at Maine Road before a crowd of 36,519. The match was televised by the BBC and it was a tremendous defensive effort that helped Warrington to a narrow 8–7 win, with Bath kicking 4 goals.

8 May 1954

Warrington	8 – 7	Halifax
Goals: Bath (4)		Tries: Thorley; Goals: Griffiths (2)

Maine Road, Manchester
Attendance: 36,519
Referee: A. Hill (Dewsbury)

Warrington	Number	Halifax
	Teams	
Eric Frodsham	1	Tuss Griffiths
Brian Bevan	2	Arthur Daniels
Jim Challinor	3	Tommy Lynch
Ron Ryder	4	Peter Todd
Stan McCormick	5	Dai Bevan
Ray Price	6	Ken Dean
Gerry Helme	7	Stan Kielty
Danny Naughton	8	John Thorley
Frank Wright	9	Alvin Ackerley
Gerry Lowe	10	Jack Wilkinson
Harry Bath	11	Albert Fearnley
Austin Heathwood	12	Gerry Schofield
Bob Ryan	13	Des Clarkson
Ces Mountford	Coach	

== Challenge Cup ==
The 1954 Challenge Cup was the 53rd staging of rugby league's oldest knockout competition, the Challenge Cup. It featured clubs from the 1953–54 Northern Rugby Football League season and is notable for its Final which had to be replayed before possibly the largest crowd in rugby league history.

== County cups ==
St. Helens beat Wigan 16–8 to win the Lancashire County Cup, and Bradford Northern beat Hull F.C. 7–2 to win the Yorkshire County Cup.

== Sources ==
- 1953-54 Northern Rugby Football League season at wigan.rlfans.com
- 1953-54 Northern Rugby Football League season at rlhalloffame.org.uk
- 1954 Challenge Cup final at rlhalloffame.org.uk
- 1954 Challenge Cup final at eraofthebiff.com
- Warrington History (1945-1970) at warringtonwolves.org
- The 1954 Odsal Challenge Cup final replay at rugbyleagueoralhistory.co.uk
