= 1952–53 Scottish Districts season =

Rugby union competition

- Countries: Scotland
- Date: 1952–53
- Matches played: 6

The 1952–53 Scottish Districts season is a record of all the rugby union matches for Scotland's district teams.

It includes the Inter-City fixture between Glasgow District and Edinburgh District.

== History ==
From the Inter-City match, it is noted that W. L. K. Cowie, Mackenzie, Blackwood improved their selection chances for the national team; and G. Culver also played well.

== Results ==
Date	Try	Conversion	Penalty	Dropped goal	Goal from mark	Notes
1948–1970	3 points	2 points	3 points	3 points	3 points	

=== Inter-City ===
13 December 1952

Glasgow District	14 – 13	Edinburgh District
Try: J. L. Blackwood; A. Stephen; Con: N. W. Cameron; Pen: N. W. Cameron x 2	Report	Try: D. M. Scott; W. L. K. Cowie x 2 Con: N. G. R. Mair x 2

Old Anniesland
Referee: A. I. Dickie (Gala)

Glasgow District:
Edinburgh District:

=== Other Scottish matches ===
8 November 1952

Glasgow District	25 – 20	Rest of West
	Report

Glasgow District:
Rest of West:

8 November 1952

South	5 – 0	Edinburgh District
	Report

South:
Edinburgh District:

15 November 1952

North	14 – 6	Midlands
	Report

Linksfield Stadium, Aberdeen
Referee: J. Ross (Heriots F.P.)

North:
Midlands:

22 November 1952

North	6 – 32	South
	Preview; Report

University Park, St. Andrews
Referee: J. A. S. Taylor (Musselburgh)

North:
South:

=== English matches ===
16 October 1952

South	8 – 8	Durham County
Try: David Rose; A. F. Dorward; Con: R. L. Wilson	Report

Mansfield Park, Hawick

South:
Durham County:

=== International matches ===
No touring matches this season.
