= 1949–50 Challenge Cup =

Rugby league competition

- Duration: 5 rounds
- Winners: Warrington
- Runners-up: Widnes

The 1949–50 Challenge Cup was the 49th staging of rugby league's oldest knockout competition, the Challenge Cup.

== First round ==
Date	Team one	Score one	Team two	Score two
04 Feb	Barrow	5	Hull FC	10
04 Feb	Batley	10	Castleford	9
04 Feb	Belle Vue Rangers	20	Whitehaven	2
04 Feb	Broughton Moor	5	Wakefield Trinity	28
04 Feb	Cardiff	10	Salford	15
04 Feb	Featherstone Rovers	19	Bramley	2
04 Feb	Huddersfield	6	Dewsbury	9
04 Feb	Hull Kingston Rovers	2	Warrington	12
04 Feb	Leeds	14	Leigh	7
04 Feb	Oldham	5	Bradford Northern	16
04 Feb	St Helens	10	Halifax	6
04 Feb	Swinton	24	Liverpool	10
04 Feb	Widnes	15	Rochdale Hornets	2
04 Feb	Workington Town	0	Keighley	5
04 Feb	Boys Club	7	Hunslet	45
04 Feb	York	2	Wigan	38
11 Feb	Bradford Northern	6	Oldham	8
11 Feb	Bramley	5	Featherstone Rovers	2
11 Feb	Castleford	6	Batley	6
11 Feb	Dewsbury	4	Huddersfield	2
11 Feb	Halifax	2	St Helens	0
11 Feb	Hull FC	0	Barrow	11
11 Feb	Hunslet	18	Boys Club	9
11 Feb	Keighley	4	Workington Town	3
11 Feb	Leigh	7	Leeds	2
11 Feb	Liverpool	9	Swinton	25
11 Feb	Rochdale Hornets	0	Widnes	27
11 Feb	Salford	20	Cardiff	5
11 Feb	Wakefield Trinity	73	Broughton Moor	3
11 Feb	Warrington	24	Hull Kingston Rovers	4
11 Feb	Whitehaven	12	Belle Vue Rangers	0
11 Feb	Wigan	65	York	15

== Second round ==
Date	Team one	Score one	Team two	Score two
25 Feb	Barrow	6	Featherstone Rovers	2
25 Feb	Belle Vue Rangers	6	Hunslet	17
25 Feb	Leeds	7	Wigan	2
25 Feb	Salford	2	St Helens	9
25 Feb	Warrington	17	Swinton	2
02 Mar	Batley	4	Widnes	12
06 Mar	Bradford Northern	13	Keighley	2
06 Mar	Wakefield Trinity	2	Dewsbury	2
08 Mar	Dewsbury	10	Wakefield Trinity	15

== Quarterfinals ==
Date	Team one	Score one	Team two	Score two
11 Mar	Leeds	14	Wakefield Trinity	8
11 Mar	St Helens	0	Bradford Northern	0
11 Mar	Warrington	21	Hunslet	7
11 Mar	Widnes	12	Barrow	7
15 Mar	Bradford Northern	11	St Helens	0

== Semifinals ==
Date	Team one	Score one	Team two	Score two
01 Apr	Warrington	16	Leeds	4
01 Apr	Widnes	8	Bradford Northern	0

== Final ==
Warrington beat Widnes 19–0 in the final played at Wembley in front of a crowd of 94,249. This was Warrington's third Cup final win in nine Final appearances. In the match Albert Naughton, at centre for Warrington opposed his older brother Johnny, who was in the Widnes second row. This was the second successive Final that the losing side had failed to score. The Warrington scrum-half Gerry Helme won the Lance Todd Trophy for man-of-the-match.

6 May 1950

Warrington	19 – 0	Widnes
Try Ryder, Bath, Knowelden; Goals Palin (3); DG Palin

Wembley, London
Attendance: 94,249
Referee: A S Dobson (Pontefract)
Player of the Match: Gerry Helme

1	Les 'Cowboy' Jones
2	Brian Bevan
3	Ron Ryder
4	Albert Naughton
5	Albert E. Johnson
6	Bryn Knowelden
7	Gerry Helme
8	William "Billy" Derbyshire
9	Harold H. 'Ike' Fishwick
10	Ron Fisher
11	Harry Bath (c)
12	Gerry Lowe
13	Harold Palin
Coach:
Chris Brockbank

1	Frank Bradley
2	John Parkes
3	Colin Hutton
4	Tommy Sale (c)
5	xAustin 'Gus' Malone
6	Jackie Fleming
7	Harry 'Tich' Anderson
8	Charlie Reynolds
9	Johnny Naughton
10	Fred Leigh
11	Charlie Wilcox
12	Robert Band
13	Ron Rowbottom
Coach:
