= 1954 World Cup =

1954 World Cup may refer to:

- 1954 Rugby League World Cup
- 1954 FIFA World Cup
