= Cumberland High School =

Cumberland High School can refer to:

In the United States

- Cumberland High School, in Toledo, Illinois
- Cumberland High School (Rhode Island), in Cumberland, Rhode Island
- Cumberland High School, in Cumberland, Virginia
- Cumberland High School (Wisconsin), in Cumberland, Wisconsin
- Cumberland County High School, in Burkesville, Kentucky
- Cumberland County High School, in Crossville, Tennessee
- Cumberland Regional High School, in Seabrook, New Jersey

Elsewhere

- Cumberland High School (Carlingford), in Carlingford, Australia
- Cumberland High School, in Portmore, Jamaica
- Cumberland High School, in Cumberland, British Columbia, Canada
