= Dai Royston Bevan =

GB & Wales international rugby league footballer

Personal information
- Full name: David Royston Bevan
- Born: 2 January 1928; Pontypridd district, Wales
- Died: 12 April 2008 (aged 80); Heywood, Greater Manchester, England

Playing information

Rugby union
Club
Years	Team	Pld	T	G	FG	P
	Oldham RUFC

Rugby league
- Position: Wing
Club
Years	Team	Pld	T	G	FG	P
1952–53	Wigan	59	45	0	0	135
1953–56	Halifax	101	34	0	0	102
	Total	160	79	0	0	237
Representative
Years	Team	Pld	T	G	FG	P
1953	Wales	2	0	0	0	0
1952	Great Britain	2	2	0	0	6

David "Dai" Royston "Roy" Bevan (2 January 1928 – 12 April 2008) was a Welsh rugby union, and professional rugby league footballer who played in the 1950s. He played club level rugby union (RU) for Oldham RUFC, and representative level rugby league (RL) for Great Britain and Wales, and at club level for Wigan, and Halifax, as a wing.

== Playing career ==
=== International honours ===
Bevan won caps for Wales (RL) while at Wigan 1953 2-caps, and won a cap for Great Britain (RL) while at Wigan in 1952 against Australia.

Bevan also represented Great Britain while at Wigan/Halifax between 1952 and 1956 against France (1 non-Test match).

=== Championship final appearances ===
Bevan played for Wigan during the 1951–52 season, but not in Wigan's 13–6 victory over Dewsbury in the Rugby Football League Championship Final during the 1951–52 season at Leeds Road, Huddersfield on Saturday 10 May 1952.

=== Challenge Cup Final appearances ===
Bevan played on the wing in Halifax's 4–4 draw with Warrington in the 1954 Challenge Cup Final during the 1953–54 season at Wembley Stadium, London on Saturday 24 April 1954, in front of a crowd of 81,841, and played on the wing in the 4–8 defeat by Warrington in the 1954 Challenge Cup Final replay during the 1953–54 season at Odsal Stadium, Bradford on Wednesday 5 May 1954, in front of a record crowd of 102,575 or more.

=== Club career ===
Bevan made his début for Wigan on Wednesday 2 April 1952, he played his last game for Wigan on Saturday 10 October 1953, he was transferred from Wigan to Halifax, and he played his last game for Halifax during 1956.

== Personal life ==
Following his retirement from rugby league, Dai Bevan lived in Middleton near Rochdale, and became a teacher at Moorclose School (now named Middleton Technical School), he died on 12 April 2008, aged 80, in Heywood near Rochdale. The funeral was on Monday 21 April 2008 at Rochdale Crematorium.
