= Jean Pambrun =

Former France international rugby league footballer

Personal information
- Born: 25 December 1929; Mérilheu, Hautes-Pyrénées, Occitania, France
- Died: 18 July 2006 (aged 76); Cabestany, France

Playing information

Rugby league
- Position: Second-row
Club
Years	Team	Pld	T	G	FG	P
	Marseille XIII
	XIII Catalan
	Total	0	0	0	0	0
Representative
Years	Team	Pld	T	G	FG	P
1953–57	France	9	0	0	0	0

Rugby union
Club
Years	Team	Pld	T	G	FG	P
	Stadoceste Tarbais
	Stade Rochelais
	Total	0	0	0	0	0

Jean Pambrun (25 December 1929 – 18 July 2006) was a French rugby league player who represented France in the 1954 World Cup. His usual position was second row. He was born in Mérilheu and died in Cabestany.

== Playing career ==
Pambrun played for Marseille and then, for XIII Catalan, and made his debut for France in the 1953–54 European Rugby League Championship. He later played in the 1954 Rugby League World Cup. He was capped for France between 1953 and 1957.
