= René Deleris =

French rugby union player (1926–2022)

- Born: 24 March 1926 Carmaux, France
- Died: 27 December 2022 (aged 96)

Rugby union career
- Position: Centre
Senior career
Years	Team	Apps	(Points)
?–?	Carmaux	?	(?)

René Charles Gustave Deleris (24 March 1926 – 27 December 2022) was a French rugby union player who played as a centre. As a member of US Carmaux, he was a champion of the French Rugby Union Championship in 1951. In addition to his rugby union career, he worked as a teacher.

Deleris's son, Christian, played rugby as a centre for Paris Université Club and Tarbes Pyrénées Rugby before becoming a coach for Colomiers Rugby and Castres Olympique.

René Deleris died on 27 December 2022, at the age of 96.
