= Charlie Appleton =

British rugby league referee

Personal information
- Full name: Charles Frederick Appleton
- Born: 1913 Warrington, England
- Died: 7 September 1996 (aged 83) Warrington, England

Refereeing information
Years	Competition	Apps
1946–64	Rugby Football League Championship
1947–59	Internationals

Charles Frederick Appleton (1913 – 1996) was a British rugby league referee. He refereed over 20 Test matches, including the World Cup final in 1954. He also officiated in three Challenge Cup Finals.

== Biography ==
Born in Warrington, Appleton began refereeing games in the Rugby Football League after the Second World War.

He took charge of his first Challenge Cup final in 1952, and also refereed the finals in 1957 and 1959.

In 1954, he refereed the inaugural Rugby League World Cup final between Great Britain and France.

He reached the mandatory retirement age of 50 in 1963, but agreed to continue refereeing for a further year due to a shortage of experienced officials in the game.

As part of the celebration of rugby league's centenary season, Appleton was awarded a medal to commemorate the finals he had refereed at Wembley Stadium. He died in September 1996, aged 83.
