= Ray Price (rugby) =

Australia dual-code international rugby footballer

Ray Price OAM
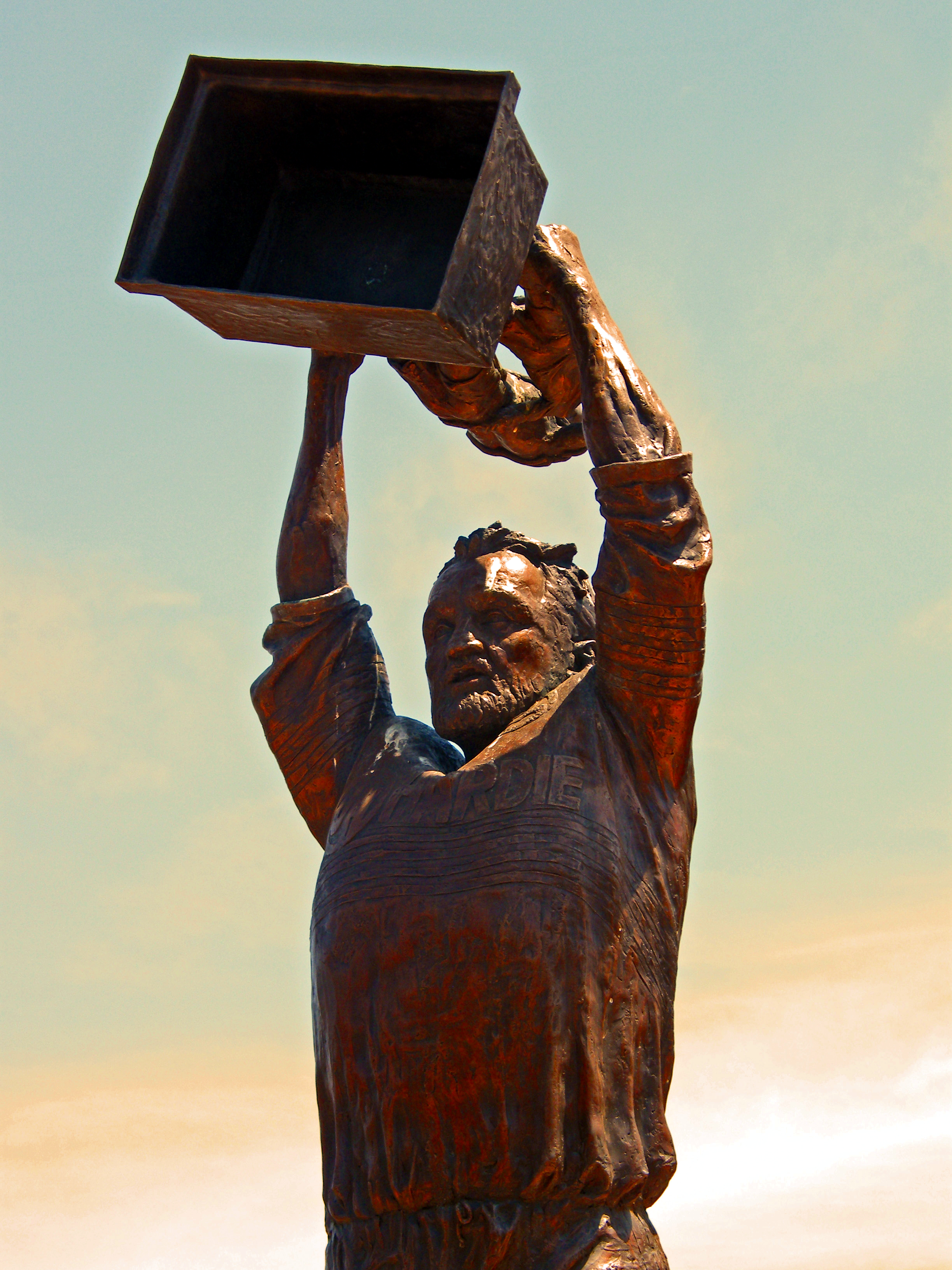

Personal information
- Full name: Raymond Alan Price
- Born: 4 March 1953 (age 73) Sydney, New South Wales, Australia

Playing information
- Height: 183 cm (6 ft 0 in)
- Weight: 89 kg (14 st 0 lb)

Rugby union
- Position: Flanker / Breakaway
Club
Years	Team	Pld	T	G	FG	P
1971–75	Parramatta	68
Representative
Years	Team	Pld	T	G	FG	P
1974–75	Australia	7	4	0	0	16
1974–75	NSW Waratahs	8	2	0	0	8

Rugby league
- Position: Lock
Club
Years	Team	Pld	T	G	FG	P
1976–86	Parramatta Eels	259	78	0	0	258
1989–90	Wakefield Trinity	25	6	0	0	24
	Total	284	84	0	0	282
Representative
Years	Team	Pld	T	G	FG	P
1978–84	New South Wales	15	6	0	0	18
1978–84	Australia	22	10	0	0	31
1979–83	City NSW	5	4	0	0	12
- Relatives: Don Price (brother); Peter Diversi (uncle)

Raymond Alan Price OAM (born 4 March 1953) is an Australian former dual-code international rugby union and rugby league footballer. He was nicknamed “Mr Perpetual Motion” for his hard, intimidating style of play in league at lock forward. Price played rugby league for Sydney's Parramatta Eels club, with whom he won four NSWRL premierships, a Dally M Medal and a Rothmans Medal. He also played in State of Origin for New South Wales.

== Early life ==
Price was raised in western Sydney and educated at Cumberland High School. He is the son of former North Sydney Bears player Kevin Price, and nephew of Norths and Manly-Warringah test forward Peter Diversi. Price was married in 1976 to Christine Minns of Villawood NSW, they had 2 children together, son Benjamin Price born in 1978 and daughter Kasey Price born in 1980. He has 3 grandsons from this marriage. He was divorced in 1996 after 20 years of marriage.

== Playing career ==
Ray Price began his career playing rugby union for Junior Club Dundas Valley, played senior rugby union for the Parramatta Two Blues, New South Wales Waratahs and represented the Wallabies in seven Tests, as flanker/breakaway, between 1974 and 1975, scoring four tries. One of these was against the New Zealand All Blacks, when, following a wayward penalty kick, Price wrested the ball from an in-goal defender, and scored. During the 1975 England rugby tour of Australia, Price was so intimidating off the back of the lineout, that English flyhalf Alan Old stood more than 20 metres or 66 feet from the scrumhalf.

After this, Price moved to play rugby league for the Parramatta Eels and was an instant sensation with his courage and high work rate. Although Parramatta lost the grand final that year, Price played consistently well throughout, and he only improved in the following three seasons, maintaining his form even in the fiery and successful assault of the St. George pack in the 1977 Grand Final Replay (which Parramatta lost 0–22). Despite being controversially sent off in the 1978 minor semi-final, it was no surprise when Price was chosen to go on the 1978 Kangaroo tour.

In July of that year his international rugby league début in the 2nd Test against New Zealand in Brisbane saw him become Australia's 36th dual code rugby international following Geoff Richardson and preceding Michael O'Connor.

1979 proved to be Price's finest year, for he won the Rothmans Medal and the Rugby League Week Player of the Year awards and selected to play at lock forward for Australia in all three test matches of the 1979 Great Britain Lions tour. He'd become established as the premier lock in Australia, a place he was to hold until the mid 1980s. Although his form at club level never reached quite the same standard of his first four seasons, his high work rate and chasing of Peter Sterling's kicks made Price an integral part of Parramatta's hat-trick of premierships in 1981-1982-1983. Though he had been superseded by both Wayne Pearce of the Balmain Tigers (who had been moved into the second row in test and NSW teams since 1982/83) and Paul Vautin of Manly-Warringah as Australia's premier lock, Price was still at his best in 1985, winning the Dally M Lock of the Year for the fourth successive year and the Rugby League Week Player of the Year award for the second time. That same year, Price became the first rugby league player to win the Order of Australia Medal (OAM).

With Parramatta winning their second premiership in succession, Price was an automatic selection for the 1982 Kangaroo Tour. Coached by Frank Stanton, the 1982 Kangaroos went through their tour of Great Britain and France undefeated, becoming the first Kangaroo touring side to achieve the feat. As a result, the 1982 Kangaroos became known as The Invincibles. Price played in the first two Ashes tests against Great Britain and was named Man of the Match in the Kangaroos 27–4 win in the second test at Wigan's Central Park ground. A knee injury would keep him out of the final test against the Lions at Headingley in Leeds as well as the two test series against France. He also played in the pre-tour test against Papua New Guinea in Port Moresby. Australia won its first ever test against the Kumuls 38–4.

Following the enforced retirement of incumbent NSW and Australian captain Max Krilich due to a persistent neck injury in 1983, Ray Price was given the captaincy of NSW for the 1984 State of Origin series. Although Queensland won the series 2–1, there was a strong public push, especially within the Sydney media and from the NSWRL, for Price to be named as Australian captain for the upcoming Ashes series against Great Britain. However, with a view to the future, the Australian Rugby League named Queensland captain (and vice-captain of the 1982 Kangaroos) Wally Lewis as the new test captain. Price retired from representative football following the final test of the 1984 Ashes series, played in front of 18,756 at the Sydney Cricket Ground. Australia won the match 20–7 and the series 3–0. Following the game, Price gave his No. 13 (Lock-forward) jumper to Pearce in a symbol of passing the torch.

1986 was planned to be (and was) his last season with the Eels and he celebrated with an unprecedented fifth straight win of the Dally M Lock of the Year and a premiership win in the grand final.

After moving into the media with 2UE for two years, Price made a comeback at age thirty-six with English club Wakefield Trinity. He stayed for one season (1989–90) and played 25 games, scoring 6 tries. However, after one season, he sought and obtained election to the Parramatta board, but his comments about the club's decline in the early 1990s were widely criticised and he lost his place in 1994.

== Post-football ==
On 12 December 2006, Price revealed he was suffering from bowel cancer. He appeared on The Footy Show on 16 June 2007 and declared that he had beaten the aforesaid cancer. Price married into the Kellett family. Ray Price is retired and lives in Northern NSW with his wife Sandy. He is a regular on the local golf courses and is still actively involved in charity work for organisations, including Men of League.

The annual Ray Price Invitational Charity Golf Day is a fundraiser for Melanoma Institute Australia, which Ray and wife Sandy are ambassadors.

== Rugby league career statistics ==
Team	Matches	Tries	Goals	Field Goals	Points	Years
Parramatta Eels	258	78	–	–	258	1976–1986
New South Wales	15	6	–	–	18	1978–1984
Australia	22	10	–	–	31	1978–1984
NSW City	5	4	–	–	12	1979–1983
Wakefield Trinity	25	6	–	–	24	1989–1990
Total	325	104	–	–	343	1976–1986, 1989–1990

== Achievements ==
=== Awards ===
- Rothmans Medal in 1979
- Harry Sunderland Medal in 1979
- Dally M. Medal in 1982
- Order of Australia in 1985
- Inductee, Sport Australia Hall of Fame in 1992
- Australian Sports Medal on 24 October 2000
- Named in Parramatta Legends Team (Greatest Lock Forward) in 2002
- Named in Feb 2008 in the list of Australia's 100 Greatest Players (1908–2007) commissioned by the NRL and ARL to celebrate the code's centenary year in Australia.
- Awarded a statue outside Parramatta Stadium in 2009
