= Gerry Lowe (rugby league, born 1927) =

English rugby league and union footballer (1927–2018)

Personal information
- Full name: Gerard Lowe
- Born: 16 November 1927 Warrington, England
- Died: 2 March 2018 (aged 90) Altrincham, England

Playing information
- Position: Prop, Second-row
Club
Years	Team	Pld	T	G	FG	P
1950–56	Warrington	129	12	0	0	36
1956–59	Keighley	95	5	0	0	15
	Total	224	17	0	0	51
Representative
Years	Team	Pld	T	G	FG	P
1954–55	Lancashire	4	0	0	0	0

Gerry Lowe (16 November 1927 – 2 March 2018) was an English rugby union and rugby league footballer who played in the 1940s and 1950s. He played rugby union for Warrington RUFC and rugby league for Warrington, and Keighley, as a prop or second-row.

== Background ==
Gerry Lowe was born in Warrington, Lancashire, England, and he died aged 90 in Altrincham, Trafford.

== Playing career ==
=== Warrington ===
Lowe joined Warrington in 1950 and was a member of the squad that won the Lancashire League four times in six seasons during the 1950s; 1950–51, 1953–54, 1954–55 and 1955–56.

Gerry Lowe made his début for Warrington on 7 April 1950 at Widnes, and he played his last match for Warrington on 11 February 1956 in a Challenge Cup game against St. Helens.

In his first season with Warrington, Lowe played at second-row, in Warrington's 19–0 victory over Widnes in the 1949–50 Challenge Cup Final at Wembley Stadium, London on 6 May 1950, in front of a crowd of 94,249.

In 1954 he played at prop in the 4–4 draw with Halifax in the 1954 Challenge Cup Final during the 1953–54 season at Wembley Stadium on 24 April 1954, in front of a crowd of 81,841 and played in the same position as Warrington won 8–4 in the replay at Odsal Stadium, Bradford, on 5 May 1954, in front of a record crowd of 102,575 or more.

=== Keighley ===
After leaving Warrington, Lowe joined Keighley where he scored 5 tries in 95 appearances between 1956 and 1959.

== Representative games ==
Love appeared for Lancashire on four occasions.
