= Des Clarkson =

England international rugby league footballer

Personal information
- Full name: Desmond Clarkson
- Born: 25 January 1923 Tadcaster, England
- Died: January 2002 (aged 78) Pontefract, England

Playing information
- Position: Second-row, Loose forward
Club
Years	Team	Pld	T	G	FG	P
1944–48	Hunslet	144	21	214	0	491
1948	Leigh
1948–51	Leeds	116	10	48	0	126
1951–54	Halifax	116	22	89	0	244
195?–5?	Keighley
1956–57	Castleford	1	0	3	0	6
	Total	377	53	354	0	867
Representative
Years	Team	Pld	T	G	FG	P
1947–48	England	2	1	0	0	3

Desmond Clarkson (25 January 1923 – January 2002) was an English professional rugby league footballer who played in the 1940s and 1950s. He played at representative level for England, and at club level for Hunslet, Leigh, Leeds, Halifax, Keighley and Castleford, as a second-row or loose forward.

== Biography ==
Des Clarkson was born in Tadcaster, West Riding of Yorkshire, England, and he died aged 78 in Pontefract, West Yorkshire, England.

== Playing career ==
=== Club career ===
Clarkson played loose forward in Halifax's 4-4 draw with Warrington in the 1954 Challenge Cup Final during the 1953–54 season at Wembley Stadium, London on Saturday 24 April 1954, in front of a crowd of 81,841, and played loose forward in the 4-8 defeat by Warrington in the 1954 Challenge Cup Final replay during the 1953–54 season at Odsal Stadium, Bradford on Wednesday 5 May 1954, in front of a record crowd of 102,575 or more.

=== International honours ===
Clarkson won caps for England while at Hunslet in 1947 against Wales, and in 1948 against France.
