= Don Price (rugby) =

Australian rugby league footballer

Personal information
- Full name: Donald Keith Price
- Born: 4 August 1956 (age 68); Sydney, New South Wales, Australia

Playing information

Rugby union
Club
Years	Team	Pld	T	G	FG	P
19??–82	Parramatta Two Blues

Rugby league
- Position: Second-row
Club
Years	Team	Pld	T	G	FG	P
1982–84	Penrith Panthers	13	0	0	0	0
1985–87	Parramatta Eels	14	1	0	0	4
	Total	27	1	0	0	4
- Source: As of 23 November 2023
- Relatives: Ray Price (brother); Peter Diversi (uncle)

Don Price (born 4 August 1956) is an Australian former professional rugby league footballer who played in the 1980s. He played for Penrith and Parramatta in the NSWRL competition.

== Playing career ==
Price is the son of Kevin 'Bluey' Price who played for North Sydney and the brother of Parramatta legend Ray Price. He played junior rugby union for the Dundas Valley Lions and Telopea Primary School. He would later play senior rugby union for the Parramatta Two Blues. Price toured Fiji with the Australian Rugby Union team in 1980 but failed in play in a Test match. After switching codes to rugby league, Price signed for Penrith. He made his first grade debut for Penrith in round 1 of the 1982 NSWRFL season against Illawarra. After three seasons with Penrith, Price signed for Parramatta joining his brother in the process. Price played for Parramatta in two finals games during the 1985 finals series which were against his former club Penrith and Balmain. After not playing any games in 1986 for the Parramatta first grade side, he managed to get some game time during the 1987 season playing seven matches.
