= 1950–51 French Rugby Union Championship =

- Countries: France
- Champions: Carmaux
- Runners-up: Stadoceste

The 1950–51 French Rugby Union Championship of first division was contested by 48 teams divided into eight pools of six. Twenty-four teams qualified to play a second phase with eight pools of three clubs. The first of each pool were qualified to play in the quarterfinals.

The championship was won by Carmaux, which beat Stadoceste in the final. It was the only title won by Carmaux.

== Context ==
The 1951 Five Nations Championship was won by Ireland, while France finished second.

The "Coupe de France" was won by Lourdes, which beat Stadoceste in the final.

The situation both inside and outside the ground during the final was so bad that British unions asked to withdraw.

== Second qualification round ==
Teams that qualified for quarterfinals are in bold.

=== Pool A ===
- Bergerac
- **Lourdes**
- Brive

=== Pool B ===
- **Toulon**
- Toulouse
- Périgueux

=== Pool C ===
- Pau
- **Lyon OU**
- Castres

=== Pool D ===
- **Carmaux**
- Bègles
- Racing

=== Pool E ===
- Montauban
- **Agen**
- Cognac

=== Pool F ===
- **Perpignan**
- Biarritz
- Mont-de-Marsan

=== Pool G ===
- **Stadoceste**
- Vienne
- Romans

=== Pool H ===
- Limoges
- **Montferrand**
- Angoulême

== Quarterfinals ==
Clubs in bold qualified for the semifinals.

**Carmaux**	-	Agen	5 - 0
Montferrand	-	Lourdes	5 - 0
**Stadoceste**	-	Toulon	6 - 3
Perpignan	-	Lyon OU	5 - 0

== Semifinals ==
**Carmaux**	-	Montferrand	16 - 9
**Stadocest**	-	Perpignan	15 - 0

== Final ==
Teams	**Carmaux** - Stadoceste
Score	**14-12 (o.t.)**
Date	20 May 1951
Venue	Stadium, Toulouse
Referee	Jean Rous
Line-up
Carmaux	Raymond Carrère, Louis Combettes, Jean-Marie Bez, Jean Gervais, Alexis Dalla-Riva, René Pailhous, Louis Aué, Jean Régis, René Pagès, Gérard Lasmolles, René Deleris, Gustave Golajewski, Georges Cassou, Francis Cassou, Jacques Sagols
Stadoceste	Albert Fourcade, Robert Bel, Marc Laffitte, René Soulet, Joseph Dutrey, Armand Save, Gilbert Paradge, Serge Tonus, Lucien Dufourc, Adrien Abadie, Albert Bagnères, Louis Suberbie, Albert Lavantes, Maurice Cazaux, René Chaubet
Scorers
Carmaux	1 try, 1 conversion and 3 penalties Aué
Stadoceste	1 try Lavantes, 3 penalties Chaubet
