= Eric Frodsham =

English rugby league footballer

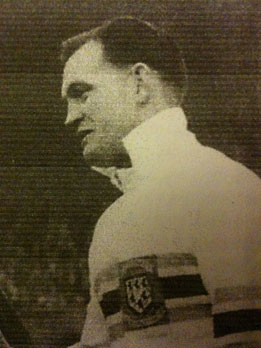

Personal information
- Born: 15 February 1923; St Helens, England
- Died: 19 January 2003 (aged 79)

Playing information
- Position: Fullback
Club
Years	Team	Pld	T	G	FG	P
1947–48	St. Helens	33	1	0	0	3
1948–56	Warrington	226	19	34	0	125
	Total	259	20	34	0	128
Representative
Years	Team	Pld	T	G	FG	P
1955	Lancashire	1	0	0	0	0
- Relatives: Alf Frodsham (brother)

Eric Frodsham (14 February 1923 – 19 January 2003) was an English professional rugby league footballer who played in the 1940s and 1950s. He played at club level for St. Helens and Warrington (captain), as a fullback.

== Club career ==
Following Royal Navy service during World War II, Frodsham signed for St. Helens in 1947. After a short spell for the club, he was transferred to Warrington in 1948, it was there that he spent the remainder of his career.

In 1950, Frodsham made his first-team breakthrough when he replaced Les "Cowboy" Jones as fullback. He went on to make a total of 48 appearances for Warrington during the 1950–51 season, a club record which he repeated in 1953–54, and still holds to this day.

The highlight of Frodsham's career came in the 1953–54 season in which Warrington secured both the League and Challenge Cup titles.

Frodsham's career came to an end in 1955 when he broke his wrist during a 25–7 victory over Liverpool City. In total he made 226 appearances for Warrington, scoring 125 points.

Eric Frodsham made his début for Warrington on Saturday 4 September 1948, and he played his last match for Warrington on Monday 9 April 1956.

=== Championship final appearances ===
Eric Frodsham played, and was captain in Warrington's 8–7 victory over Halifax the Championship Final during the 1953–54 season at Maine Road, Manchester on Saturday 8 May 1954, in front of a crowd of 36,519.

=== Challenge Cup Final appearances ===
Eric Frodsham played fullback, and was captain in Warrington's 8–4 victory over Halifax in the 1954 Challenge Cup Final replay during the 1953–54 season at Odsal Stadium, Bradford on Wednesday 5 May 1954, in front of a record crowd of 102,575 or more. At the time, this was a world record attendance for a rugby match of either code.

=== County Cup Final appearances ===
Eric Frodsham played fullback in Warrington's 5–28 defeat by Wigan in the 1950 Lancashire Cup Final during the 1950–51 season at Station Road, Swinton on Saturday 4 November 1950.

== Genealogical information ==
Eric Frodsham was the younger brother of the rugby league footballer; Alf Frodsham, and the rugby league footballer who played in the 1930s and 1940s for St. Helens; W. Harry Frodsham.

== Death ==
Frodsham died in his home in Rainford, St. Helens in January 2003. He was survived by his widow Doris, and his daughters Linda, Susan and Julie.
