= Sam Smith (rugby league) =

Former GB & England international rugby league footballer

Personal information
- Full name: Samuel Smith
- Born: 1926; Kingston upon Hull, England
- Died: 24 October 1989 (aged 62–63); Kingston upon Hull, England

Playing information
- Position: Hooker
Club
Years	Team	Pld	T	G	FG	P
1949–54	Hull Kingston Rovers	116	0	0	0	0
1954–64	Hunslet	282
1964	Doncaster RLFC		0	0	0	0
	Total	398	0	0	0	0
Representative
Years	Team	Pld	T	G	FG	P
1953	Yorkshire	1
1955–56	England	2	0	0	0	0
1954	Great Britain	4	0	0	0	0

Samuel Smith (1926–1989) was an English World Cup winning semi professional rugby league footballer who played in the 1940s and 1950s. He played at representative level for Great Britain, England and Yorkshire, and at club level for Hull Kingston Rovers and Hunslet, as a hooker.

== Career ==
Smith signed on with Hull Kingston Rovers for the 1949–50 season.

During the 1952–53 season Smith was an ever-present, playing in every match alongside Arthur Palframan. That season, Smith represented Yorkshire against Lancashire.

In 1954, Smith was transferred from Hull Kingston Rovers to Hunslet. Sam appeared 282 times during his ten seasons with Hunlet before moving to Doncaster.

=== International honours ===
Sam Smith won caps for England while at Hunslet in 1955 against Other Nationalities, in 1956 against France, and won caps for Great Britain while at Hunslet in the 1954 Rugby League World Cup against Australia, New Zealand, and France. (World Cup 1954, 4 caps).

Sam Smith played hooker in all four of Great Britain's inaugural 1954 Rugby League World Cup matches, including Great Britain’s 16–12 victory over France in the 1954 World Cup final at Parc des Princes, Paris on 13 November 1954.

Sam Smith also represented Great Britain while at Hunslet between 1954 and 1956 against France (1 non-Test match).

== Death ==
Smith died in October 1989, aged 63.
