= Cumberland High School (Carlingford) =

School in New South Wales, Australia

Location
- Carlingford, New South Wales; Australia; 33°47′3″S 151°2′13″E

Information
- Type: Public, co-educational
- Motto: Latin: Finis Coronat Opus (The End Crowns the Work)
- Established: February 1962
- Principal: Luke Fulwood
- Enrolment: 655 (as of 2019)
- Campus: Suburban
- Colours: Green, white & brown
- Website: cumberland-h.schools.nsw.gov.au

Cumberland High School is a co-educational comprehensive secondary school (high school) located in the north-western metropolitan Western Sydney region of New South Wales, Australia. Cumberland High School opened in January 1962. The current principal for Cumberland is Luke Fulwood, who succeeded Mechel Pikoulas in January 2023.

== Notable alumni ==
- Ray Price, Parramatta, NSW and Australian representative in Rugby Union and Rugby League.
- Jeni Klugman, B.Ec., LL.B., (Sydney), 1988 NSW Rhodes Scholar. First New South Wales female Rhodes Scholar.
