= John Thorley =

GB & Wales international rugby league & union footballer

Personal information
- Full name: George M. John Thorley
- Born: 30 May 1927 Mountain Ash, Wales
- Died: 12 July 2005 (aged 78) Wheatley, Halifax

Playing information

Rugby union
Club
Years	Team	Pld	T	G	FG	P
	Neath RFC
Representative
Years	Team	Pld	T	G	FG	P
	Glamorgan

Rugby league
- Position: Prop
Club
Years	Team	Pld	T	G	FG	P
1952–60	Halifax	261	27	0	0	81
1960–≥60	Dewsbury
	Total	261	27	0	0	81
Representative
Years	Team	Pld	T	G	FG	P
1955	Other Nationalities	2	0	0	0	0
1953–59	Wales	3	0	0	0	0
1954–56	Great Britain	5	0	0	0	0

George M. John Thorley (30 May 1927 – 12 July 2005) born in Mountain Ash, was a Welsh rugby union and World Cup winning professional rugby league footballer who played in the 1950s and 1960s. He played representative level rugby union (RU) for Glamorgan, and at club level Neath RFC, and representative level rugby league (RL) for Great Britain, Wales and Other Nationalities, and at club level for Halifax and Dewsbury, as a prop, he died in Wheatley, Halifax.

== Playing career ==
=== Club career ===
Thorley played his last game for Dewsbury against Halifax at Thrum Hall, Halifax.

Thorley played at prop in Halifax's 4–4 draw with Warrington in the 1953–54 Challenge Cup Final during the 1953–54 season at Wembley Stadium, London on Saturday 24 April 1954, in front of a crowd of 81,841, and played at prop in the 4–8 defeat by Warrington in the 1953–54 Challenge Cup Final replay during the 1953–54 season at Odsal Stadium, Bradford on Wednesday 5 May 1954, in front of a record crowd of 102,575 or more.

=== International honours ===
John Thorley played twice for Other Nationalities in 1955 while at Halifax, and won three caps for Wales while at Halifax between 1953 and 1959.

Thorley won five caps for Great Britain, playing at prop in all four of Great Britain's 1954 Rugby League World Cup matches, including Great Britain's 16–12 victory over France in the 1954 Rugby League World Cup Final at Parc des Princes, Paris on 13 November 1954. Thorley also represented Great Britain while at Halifax in 1956 against France.

== Honoured at Halifax ==
John Thorley is a Halifax Hall of Fame Inductee.

== Outside of rugby ==
After retiring from playing, John Thorley became a keen supporter of Halifax, he also took up golf and was a member of Halifax West End Golf Club for more than 30 years, was involved in the Welsh Rugby League Past Players organisation, was deputy churchwarden at Halifax Parish Church, and spent a lot of time holidaying with his wife in the south of France.
