= Ron Ryder =

GB & England international rugby league footballer

Personal information
- Full name: Ronald Joseph Ryder
- Born: 29 June 1922; Warrington, Lancashire, England
- Died: 17 August 1993 (aged 71); Blackpool, Lancashire, England

Playing information
- Position: Centre
Club
Years	Team	Pld	T	G	FG	P
1949–54	Warrington	161	50	0	0	150
1954–58	Blackpool Borough	106	8	9	0	42
	Total	267	58	9	0	192
Representative
Years	Team	Pld	T	G	FG	P
1952	England	1	0	0	0	0
1952	Great Britain	1	1	0	0	3

Ronald Joseph Ryder (29 June 1922 – 17 August 1993) was an English professional rugby league footballer who played in the 1950s. He played at representative level for Great Britain and England, and at club level for Warrington as a centre.

== Playing career ==
=== Club career ===
Ryder made his début for Warrington on Friday 15 April 1949, and he played his last match for Warrington Saturday 8 May 1954.

Ryder played at centre in Warrington's 5-28 defeat by Wigan in the 1950 Lancashire Cup Final during the 1950–51 season at Station Road, Swinton on Saturday 4 November 1950.

Ryder played at centre in Warrington's 19-0 victory over Widnes in the 1950 Challenge Cup Final during the 1949–50 season at Wembley Stadium, London on Saturday 6 May 1950, in front of a crowd of 94,249, and played at centre in Warrington's 8-4 victory over Halifax in the 1954 Challenge Cup Final replay during the 1953–54 season at Odsal Stadium, Bradford on Wednesday 5 May 1954, in front of a record crowd of 102,575 or more.

Ryder had not played in the previous 4-4 draw with Halifax in the 1954 Challenge Cup Final during the 1953–54 season at Wembley Stadium, London on Saturday 24 April 1954, in front of a crowd of 81,841, Arnold Stevens had played at centre in this match.

=== International honours ===
Ryder won a cap for England while at Warrington in 1952 against Other Nationalities, and won a cap for Great Britain while at Warrington in 1952 against Australia.
