= Tommy Sale (rugby league) =

English rugby league footballer

Personal information
- Full name: Thomas Sale
- Born: 21 July 1918; Hindsford, Lancashire, England
- Died: 3 January 2016 (aged 97); Wigan, Greater Manchester, England

Playing information
- Position: Stand-off, Scrum-half
Club
Years	Team	Pld	T	G	FG	P
1938–48	Leigh	82	16	2		52
1945–46	→Warrington (guest)	7	1	0		3
1949–51	Widnes	34	13	1		41
	Total	123	30	3	0	96

Thomas Sale MBE (21 July 1918 – 3 January 2016) was an English rugby league footballer who played in the 1940s and 1950s. He played at club level for Leigh, Warrington and Widnes.

== Playing career ==
=== Leigh ===
Sale made his début in professional rugby league for home town club Leigh at the age of 20. He played nine games for the club before competitive rugby league was suspended due to the outbreak of the Second World War. He resumed playing for the club after the war, and went on to make a total of 82 appearances for the club before losing his place in the first team in 1948.

=== Warrington ===
Following the end of the Second World War, Sale briefly played for Warrington as a guest player, making seven appearances between 1945 and 1946.

=== Widnes ===
Sale played, and was captain in Widnes' 0-19 defeat by Warrington in the 1949–50 Challenge Cup Final during the 1949–50 season at Wembley Stadium, London, in front of a crowd of 94,249.

== Post-playing career ==
After retiring, Sale remained at Leigh in various roles. He was also coach of Liverpool City in the late 1950s.He was influential in the signing of player-coach Alex Murphy, who went on to lead the team to a Challenge Cup final win in 1971.

Sale was appointed a Member of the Order of the British Empire (MBE) in the 2011 Birthday Honours for services to rugby league.
