= Armand Save =

Former France international rugby league & rugby union footballer

Personal information
- Born: 24 September 1931; Tostat, Hautes-Pyrénées, Occitania, France
- Died: 24 August 2016 (aged 84); Tostat, France

Playing information

Rugby union
Club
| Years | Team | Pld | T | G | FG | P |
|---|---|---|---|---|---|---|
| | Stadoceste Tarbais |

Rugby league
- Position: Second-row
Club
| Years | Team | Pld | T | G | FG | P |
|---|---|---|---|---|---|---|
| 19??–?? | Bordeaux |
| 19??–66 | Saint-Gaudens |
| | Total | 0 | 0 | 0 | 0 | 0 |
Representative
| Years | Team | Pld | T | G | FG | P |
| 1954–57 | France | 7 | 0 | 0 | 0 | 0 |
- Source: As of 17 January 2021

Armand Save (24 September 1931 – 24 August 2016) was a French rugby union and rugby league player.

== Biography ==
Save debuted in rugby union for Stadoceste Tarbais, where he took part at the 1950-51 French Rugby Union Championship before switching to rugby league and making a brilliant career for Bordeaux and France. He was Champion of France with Bordeaux in 1954, as well taking part to the 1954 Rugby League World Cup final lost against Australia, as well in the 1957 World Cup. At club level, he joined Saint-Gaudens.

After his sports career, he became a butcher and trained the rugby union team of Bazet, the town of which he was municipal councillor between 1977 and 1983.

== Genealogical information ==
His son, Alain Save was a rugby union player, who won the 1972-73 French Rugby Union Championship with Stadoceste Tarbais.
