= 1953–54 Challenge Cup =

Rugby league competition

1954 Challenge Cup
- Duration: 5 rounds
- Winners: Warrington
- Runners-up: Halifax
- Lance Todd Trophy: Gerry Helme

The 1954 Challenge Cup was the 53rd staging of rugby league's oldest knockout competition, the Challenge Cup. It featured clubs from the 1953–54 Northern Rugby Football League season and is particularly notable for its final, which had to be replayed at Odsal after a drawn match at Wembley, with the replay attracting possibly the largest ever crowd in world rugby league history.

== First round ==
Date	Team one	Score one	Team two	Score two
6 February 1954	Halifax	19	Dewsbury	0
6 February 1954	Hull	24	Widnes	0
6 February 1954	Keighley	12	Barrow	11
6 February 1954	Latchford Albion	20	Wigan	40
6 February 1954	Leeds	13	Batley	20
6 February 1954	Liverpool	5	Oldham	15
6 February 1954	Wakefield Trinity	24	Whitehaven	13
6 February 1954	York	18	Hull Kingston Rovers	0
13 February 1954	Barrow	6	Keighley	10
13 February 1954	Batley	6	Leeds	23
13 February 1954	Castleford	8	Doncaster	5
13 February 1954	Oldham	18	Liverpool	11
13 February 1954	Rochdale Hornets	9	Bradford Northern	9
13 February 1954	Leigh	13	Swinton	4
13 February 1954	St Helens	26	Featherstone Rovers	7
13 February 1954	Warrington	17	Bramley	0
13 February 1954	Wheldale	6	Workington Town	32
13 February 1954	Whitehaven	15	Wakefield Trinity	3
13 February 1954	Widnes	2	Hull FC	5
13 February 1954	Wigan	41	Latchford Albion	2
15 February 1954	Belle Vue Rangers	15	Huddersfield	20
16 February 1954	Dewsbury	9	Halifax	5
17 February 1954	Bradford Northern	11	Rochdale Hornets	2
17 February 1954	Bramley	5	Warrington	30
17 February 1954	Featherstone Rovers	16	St Helens	27
17 February 1954	Huddersfield	31	Belle Vue Rangers	6
17 February 1954	Hunslet	20	Salford	5
17 February 1954	Swinton	2	Leigh	17
17 February 1954	Workington Town	50	Wheldale	2
18 February 1954	Doncaster	7	Castleford	2
18 February 1954	Hull Kingston Rovers	0	York	0
22 February 1954	Salford	3	Hunslet	18

== Second round ==
Date	Team one	Score one	Team two	Score two
6 March 1954	Halifax	24	Keighley	5
6 March 1954	Huddersfield	12	St Helens	5
6 March 1954	Hull	5	Workington Town	5
6 March 1954	Hunslet	10	Whitehaven	2
6 March 1954	Leeds	12	Leigh	3
6 March 1954	Oldham	4	Warrington	7
6 March 1954	Wigan	15	Bradford Northern	10
6 March 1954	York	11	Doncaster	2
11 March 1954	Workington Town	17	Hull FC	14

== Quarterfinals ==
Date	Team one	Score one	Team two	Score two
20 March 1954	Hunslet	16	Huddersfield	7
20 March 1954	Leeds	31	Workington Town	11
20 March 1954	Warrington	26	York	5
20 March 1954	Wigan	0	Halifax	2

== Semifinals ==
Date	Team one	Score one	Team two	Score two
3 April 1954	Halifax	18	Hunslet	3
3 April 1954	Warrington	8	Leeds	4

== Final ==
Halifax and Warrington, the teams who had finished first and second respectively on the Championship ladder (separated by only one competition point), reached the Challenge Cup final Saturday 24 April 1954. The game was played at Wembley, and 81,841 spectators saw what turned out to be a comparatively lacklustre match.

24 April 1954

Warrington	4 – 4	Halifax
Goals Bath (2/6)		Goals Griffiths (2/4)

Wembley, London
Attendance: 81,841
Referee: Ron Gelder (Wakefield)

After a couple of penalties, Halifax held a 4-0 lead at half time. In the second half Warrington drew level, also kicking two penalties. There was no further scoring and the match finished in a draw, at 4 - 4. This match remains the only occasion on which Wembley hasn't seen a single try scored on Cup final day. The replay was initially scheduled for 5pm on Wednesday 5 May 1954 at Odsal Stadium, Bradford.

== Final replay ==
Around 70,000 spectators were expected at Odsal for the replay, which was rescheduled for a 7pm kick-off in order to allow for rush hour traffic in Bradford. The twenty trains and fifty buses (specially arranged for the match, as well as the 100 gatesmen and 150 policemen on duty at the ground) were believed to be adequate to deal with the expected crowd.

However, the competitive closeness with which the two teams were matched, together with the enticing prospect of the Challenge Cup decider coming north for the first time in a decade, seems to have generated far greater public interest than was supposed.

People had started queuing outside the stadium a good hour before the shuttle buses started running from 4:25pm. The gates opened at 5.00pm, and by that time some people had already been queuing for an hour and a half. With over an hour remaining before kick off, there were already an estimated 60,000 in the ground. The traffic on the roads in the surrounding area was at a standstill as more and more spectators converged on the stadium. Some squatted around the pitch, while others climbed onto rooftops for a better view. Fences around the ground had collapsed, as more people struggled to cram into the bowl of Odsal before the match started.

The official attendance figure for the crowd was announced as 102,575 however it is widely believed that a more realistic figure for the number of spectators present is closer to 120,000.

5 May 1954
7 pm

Warrington	8 – 4	Halifax
Try Challinor, Helme; Goals Bath		Goals Griffiths (2)

Odsal Stadium, Bradford
Attendance: 102,569
Referee: Ron Gelder
Player of the Match: Gerry Helme

Warrington	Posit.	Halifax
Eric Frodsham (c)	1. FB	Tyssul Griffiths
Brian Bevan	2. WG	Arthur Daniels
Jim Challinor	3. CE	Tommy Lynch
Ron Ryder	4. CE	Billy Mather
Stan McCormick	5. WG	Dai Royston Bevan
Ray Price	6. SO	Ken Dean
Gerry Helme	7. SH	Stan Kielty
Danny Naughton	8. PR	John Thorley
Frank Wright	9. HK	Alvin Ackerley (c)
Gerry Lowe	10. PR	Jack Wilkinson
Harry Bath	11. SR	Albert Fearnley
Austin Heathwood	12. SR	Derrick Schofield
Bob Ryan	13. LF	Des Clarkson

The match itself was another tense, low-scoring struggle, but an improvement on the first game. Jim Challinor opened the scoring with a try for Warrington after nine minutes. Half an hour later, Tyssul Griffiths kicked a penalty for the Halifax side, who had also had two tries disallowed. This meant a half time score of 3 - 2 in favour of Warrington.

The third quarter of the match saw additional goals kicked by both Griffiths and Harry Bath, bringing the score to 5 - 4, still just one point in favour of Warrington. Then Gerry Helme scored a try, which Bath couldn't convert, putting Warrington four points clear of Halifax, but still within a converted try. Controversy reared just before full-time, when Halifax had a third try disallowed by referee Ron Gelder. Warrington had claimed their 4th Challenge Cup, with Helme winning the Lance Todd Trophy for his match-winning performance, the first player to do so twice.
