= Frank Kitchen =

GB international rugby league footballer

Personal information
- Full name: Frank Kitchen
- Born: c. 1931 Prescot district, England
- Died: December 1992

Playing information
- Position: Wing
Club
Years	Team	Pld	T	G	FG	P
1950–56	Leigh	107	79	0	0	237
Representative
Years	Team	Pld	T	G	FG	P
1953–54	Lancashire	3	2	0	0	6
1954	Great Britain	2	3	0	0	9

Frank Kitchen (c. 1931 – December 1992) was an English professional rugby league footballer who played in the 1950s as a wing. He played at club level for Leigh, and at representative level for Great Britain, where he was part of the 1954 Rugby League World Cup winning team.

== Background ==
Frank Kitchen's birth was registered in Prescot district, Lancashire, England.

During his later years, Kitchen was an accomplished bowls player, and competed regularly throughout the 1970s and 1980s. Kitchen died in December 1992, with his funeral taking place in St Nicholas Church, St Helens.

== Rugby league career ==
=== Club career ===
Kitchen played left wing in Leigh's 22–5 victory over St Helens in the 1952–53 Lancashire Cup Final during the 1952–53 season at Station Road, Swinton on Saturday 29 November 1952.

After returning from the 1954 World Cup, Kitchen only made sporadic appearances for Leigh, as the injury he suffered during the tournament was revealed to be more serious than it was first thought, requiring a cartilage operation. However, he was unable to fully recover from the injury and was eventually forced to retire.

=== Representative career ===
Kitchen won two caps for Great Britain while at Leigh in the 1954 Rugby League World Cup. He played left wing and scored a try in Great Britain's 28–13 victory over Australia in the first group match at Stade de Gerland, Lyon on Sunday 31 October 1954, and scored two tries in Great Britain's 26–6 victory over New Zealand in the third group match at Parc Lescure, Bordeaux on Thursday 11 November 1954.

Due to a leg injury which occurred in the New Zealand game, Kitchen did not take part in Great Britain's 16–12 victory over France in the 1954 Rugby League World Cup Final.
