= Gordon Brown (rugby league) =

English rugby league footballer (1930–2026)

Personal information
- Full name: Gordon F. Brown
- Born: 1930 Leeds district, England
- Died: 12 February 2026 (aged 95)

Playing information
- Position: Stand-off
Club
Years	Team	Pld	T	G	FG	P
1950–60	Leeds	≥250	94	17	0	316
1960–≥62	Keighley
	Total		94	17	0	316
Representative
Years	Team	Pld	T	G	FG	P
1954–55	Great Britain	6	7	0	0	21

Coaching information
Club
Years	Team	Gms	W	D	L	W%
196?–6?	Keighley
- Source: As of 12 June 2012

Gordon F. Brown (1930 – 12 February 2026) was an English World Cup-winning professional rugby league footballer who played in the 1950s and 1960s, and coached in the 1960s. He played at representative level for Great Britain, and at club level for Leeds and Keighley, as a stand-off, and coached at club level for Keighley.

== Background ==
Brown's birth was registered in Leeds district, West Riding of Yorkshire, England in 1930.

== Playing career ==
=== International honours ===
Brown won caps for Great Britain while at Leeds in the 1954 Rugby League World Cup against Australia (2-tries), France (1-try), New Zealand (1-try), France (2-tries); and in 1955 against New Zealand (2 matches).

He played stand-off in all four of Great Britain's 1954 Rugby League World Cup matches, including Great Britain’s 16-12 victory over France in the 1954 Rugby League World Cup Final at Parc des Princes, Paris on 13 November 1954.

Brown also represented Great Britain while at Leeds between 1952 and 1956 against France (1 non-Test match).

=== Club career ===
Brown made his début for Leeds against Halifax at Headingley, Leeds on Saturday 22 April 1950.

== Death ==
Brown died on 12 February 2026, at the age of 95.
