= Peter Diversi =

Australian rugby league footballer

Personal information
- Full name: Peter Diversi
- Born: 5 April 1932
- Died: 22 January 2018 (aged 85) Gosford, New South Wales, Australia

Playing information
- Position: Lock, Second-row
Club
| Years | Team | Pld | T | G | FG | P |
|---|---|---|---|---|---|---|
| 1952–55 | North Sydney | 63 | 9 | 33 | 0 | 93 |
| 1958–62 | Manly-Warringah | 67 | 8 | 4 | 0 | 32 |
| | Total | 130 | 17 | 37 | 0 | 125 |
Representative
| Years | Team | Pld | T | G | FG | P |
| 1952–56 | New South Wales | 10 | 0 | 2 | 0 | 4 |
| 1954–55 | Australia | 5 | 2 | 0 | 0 | 6 |
| 1952–53 | NSW City | 2 | 0 | 0 | 0 | 0 |
| 1956 | NSW Country | 1 | 0 | 0 | 0 | 0 |
- Source: Whiticker/Hudson
- Relatives: Don Price (nephew); Ray Price (nephew)

Peter Diversi (5 April 1932 – 22 January 2018) was an Australian professional rugby league footballer who played in the 1950s and 1960s. He played for North Sydney and the Manly-Warringah Sea Eagles, New South Wales and for the Australian national side.

== Career ==
A lock forward and one of the first rugby League players of Italian heritage to play two Tests for Australia in 1954-55 and fourteen matches for New South Wales in 1952-56. A feared defender and tireless worker Diversi played 63 games for the Bears before moving to play for Gundagai and later Manly-Warringah Sea Eagles between 1958 and 1962.

Diversi retired from Sydney football and finished his career at Kurri Kurri, in the Newcastle competition.

Diversi married the sister of fellow North Sydney player Kevin Price. Kevin's son Ray Price followed in his uncle's footsteps, becoming one of the great locks in the history of the game during the 1970s and 1980s.
