= David Rose (rugby) =

GB and Scotland rugby footballer (1931–2021)

Personal information
- Full name: David M. Rose
- Born: 20 February 1931 Jedburgh, Scotland
- Died: 31 January 2021 (aged 89)

Playing information

Rugby union
- Position: Wing
Club
Years	Team	Pld	T	G	FG	P
19??–53	Jed-Forest RFC
Representative
Years	Team	Pld	T	G	FG	P
1951–53	Scotland	7

Rugby league
- Position: Wing
Club
Years	Team	Pld	T	G	FG	P
1953	Huddersfield
1953–??	Leeds
	Total	0	0	0	0	0
Representative
Years	Team	Pld	T	G	FG	P
1954	Great Britain	4	4	0	0	12

David M. Rose (20 February 1931 – 31 January 2021) was a Scottish rugby union and World Cup winning professional rugby league footballer who played in the 1950s. He played representative level rugby union (RU) for Scotland, and at club level for Jed-Forest RFC, as a Wing, and representative level rugby league (RL) for Great Britain, and at club level for Huddersfield and Leeds, as a wing.

== Rugby union ==
Rose won 7 caps for Scotland national rugby union team while at Jed-Forest RFC in 1951–53.

== Rugby league ==
Rose won caps for Great Britain (RL) while at Leeds in the 1954 Rugby League World Cup against Australia, France, New Zealand, and France. He played right wing in all four of Great Britain's 1954 Rugby League World Cup matches, including Great Britain's 16–12 victory over France in the 1954 Rugby League World Cup Final at Parc des Princes, Paris on 13 November 1954. Rose's rugby career was curtailed by a broken leg suffered after moving to Leeds.
