= Jimmy Ledgard =

GB & England international rugby league footballer

Personal information
- Full name: James Arthur Ledgard
- Born: 9 June 1922 Wakefield, England
- Died: 26 January 2007 (aged 84) Dewsbury, England

Playing information
- Position: Fullback
Club
Years	Team	Pld	T	G	FG	P
1944	Leeds	5	0	5	0	10
≤1947–48	Dewsbury
1948–58	Leigh	334	36	1043	0	2194
1958–60	Dewsbury
	Total	339	36	1048	0	2204
Representative
Years	Team	Pld	T	G	FG	P
1945–55	Yorkshire	18	1	31	0	65
1947–55	England	12	2	24	0	54
1947–54	Great Britain	11	1	19	0	41

Coaching information
Club
Years	Team	Gms	W	D	L	W%
1961–62	Bradford Northern

James Arthur Ledgard (9 June 1922 – 26 January 2007) was an English rugby union professional rugby league footballer who played in the 1940s, 1950s and 1960s, and coached rugby league in the 1960s. He played club level rugby union (RU) for Sandal RUFC, and representative level rugby league (RL) for Great Britain, England and Yorkshire, and at club level for Dewsbury (two spells), and Leigh, as a goal-kicking fullback, and coached at club level for Bradford Northern.

He was part of the Great Britain side that won the 1954 World Cup, winning his 11th and last cap in the win over France in the final.

== Background ==
Jimmy Ledgard was born in Wakefield, West Riding of Yorkshire, England, and he died aged 84 in Dewsbury, West Yorkshire, England.

== Playing career ==
=== Club career ===
Ledgard made his first senior rugby league appearances in 1944, playing in five games while on trial at Leeds. He was not signed by the club as they believed he was too small, and Ledgard instead joined Dewsbury.

Ledgard helped Dewsbury win its first and only Yorkshire League title in the 1946–47 season. He also played fullback, and scored a drop goal in the Championship Final defeat by Wigan at Maine Road, Manchester on Saturday 21 June 1947.

In 1948, Ledgard was signed by Leigh for a then-world record transfer fee of £2,650. He played fullback, and scored 2-goals in Leigh's 7–20 defeat by Wigan in the 1949–50 Lancashire Cup Final during the 1949–50 season at Wilderspool Stadium, Warrington on Saturday 29 October 1949, and played fullback in the 6–14 defeat by Wigan in the 1951–52 Lancashire Cup Final during the 1951–52 season at Station Road, Swinton on Saturday 27 October 1951.

Ledgard made 334 appearances for Leigh after joining the club in 1948, scoring a record 1,043 goals for the club as well as 36 tries. He played for the club until 1958 before returning to Dewsbury, where he finished his career.

=== Representative honours ===
Ledgard played fullback in Yorkshire's 3–12 defeat by Lancashire in the 1949 County Championship Final during the 1948–49 season at Thrum Hall, Halifax on Tuesday 3 May 1949, in front of a crowd of 7,000.

Ledgard won caps for England while at Dewsbury in 1947 against France (2 matches), and Wales, while at Leigh in 1948 against Wales, in 1949 against France, and Other Nationalities, in 1951 against Wales, and France, in 1952 against Other Nationalities (2 matches), and Wales, in 1953 against Wales, in 1955 against Other Nationalities, and won caps for Great Britain while at Dewsbury in 1947 against New Zealand (2 matches), while at Leigh in 1948 against Australia, in 1950 against Australia (2 matches), and New Zealand, in 1951 against New Zealand, and in the 1954 Rugby League World Cup against France (5-goals), Australia (2-goals), New Zealand (1-try, 4-goals) and France (2-goals).

Ledgard played fullback in all four of Great Britain's 1954 Rugby League World Cup matches, including Great Britain's 16–12 victory over France in the 1954 Rugby League World Cup Final at Parc des Princes, Paris on 13 November 1954.

As of December 2016, With 23 goals, Jimmy is 5th in the list of England's all-time Goal Scorers (behind Kevin Sinfield, George Fairbairn, Andrew Farrell and Ernest Ward, and with 52 points he is 8th in the list of England's all-time Point Scorers (behind Kevin Sinfield George Fairbairn, Ryan Hall, Andrew Farrell, Sam Tomkins, Rob Burrow, and Ernest Ward).

Achievements
Preceded by Bill Hudson	Rugby League Transfer Record; Dewsbury to Leigh; 1948–49	Succeeded by Albert Naughton
