= Gerry Helme =

English rugby league footballer and coach

Personal information
- Full name: Gerard James Helme
- Born: 4 April 1923 Leigh district, England
- Died: 19 December 1981 (aged 58) Leigh district, England

Playing information
- Position: Scrum-half
Club
Years	Team	Pld	T	G	FG	P
1945–57	Warrington	442	101	19	0	341
1958	Keighley	2	0	0	0	0
	Total	444	101	19	0	341
Representative
Years	Team	Pld	T	G	FG	P
1948–54	Lancashire	11	1	0	0	3
1954	Combined Nationalities	1	0	0	0	0
1948–53	England	4	1	0	0	3
1948–54	Great Britain	12	3	0	0	9

Coaching information
Club
Years	Team	Gms	W	D	L	W%
1964–66	Leigh
	Oldham
	Total	0	0	0	0

Gerard "Gerry" James Helme (4 April 1923 – 19 December 1981) was an English professional rugby league footballer who played in the 1940s and 1950s, and coached. He played at representative level for Great Britain, England, Combined Nationalities and Lancashire, and at club level for Warrington, as a scrum-half, and coached at club level. Helme played almost all of his club career for Warrington, with whom he won three Championship Finals and two Challenge Cup Finals and became a Warrington Wolves Hall of Fame inductee.

== Background ==
Helme's birth was registered in Leigh, Lancashire, he was a pupil of St. Joseph's school.

== Playing career ==
Helme made his début for Warrington on Wednesday 29 August 1945. Helme played scrum-half in Warrington's 15–5 victory over Bradford Northern in the 1947-48 Championship Final at Maine Road, Manchester. Helme played scrum-half in Warrington's 8–14 defeat by Wigan in the 1948–49 Lancashire Cup Final at Station Road, Swinton on Saturday 13 November 1948, Helme played scrum-half in Warrington's 19–0 victory over Widnes in the 1949–50 Challenge Cup Final at Wembley Stadium, London on Saturday 6 May 1950, in front of a crowd of 94,249. He played scrum-half in Warrington's 5–28 defeat by Wigan in the 1950–51 Lancashire Cup Final at Station Road, Swinton on Saturday 4 November 1950.

Helme represented Combined Nationalities in the 15–19 defeat by France at Stade de Gerland, Lyon on Sunday 3 January 1954. Helme played scrum-half in the 4–4 draw with Halifax in the 1953–54 Challenge Cup Final at Wembley Stadium, London on Saturday 24 April 1954, in front of a crowd of 81,841, and played scrum-half in the 8–4 victory over Halifax in the 1953–54 Challenge Cup Final replay at Odsal Stadium, Bradford on Wednesday 5 May 1954, in front of a record crowd of 102,575 or more. Helme became the first player to win the Lance Todd Trophy twice, his first coming in the victory over Widnes in the 1949–50 Challenge Cup Final, and his second coming in the victory over Halifax in the 1953–54 Challenge Cup Final replay.

Helme won caps for England while at Warrington in 1948 against Wales, France, in 1949 against Wales, France, in 1953 against France, and won caps for Great Britain while at Warrington in 1948 against Australia (3 matches), in 1954 against Australia (3 matches), New Zealand (2 matches), in the 1954 Rugby League World Cup against France (2 matches), Australia, New Zealand. He also helped Great Britain to victory by scoring the match-winning try in the first ever World Cup Final in 1954.

Helme played his last match for Warrington on Saturday 2 February 1957.

== Post-playing ==
After retiring from playing, Gerry Helme had coaching roles with Leigh and Oldham. In 1981 he died at the age of 58.
