= 1954 Rugby League World Cup =

1st World Cup tournament

Tournament details
- Host nation: France
- Dates: 30 October – 13 November
- No. of nations: 4 (reduced from 5)

Final positions
- Champions: Great Britain (1st title)
- Runner-up: France
- Third place: Australia

Tournament statistics
- Matches played: 7
- Attendance: 138,329 (19,761 per match)
- Top scorer(s): Jimmy Ledgard (29)
- Most tries: Gordon Brown (6)

The 1954 Rugby League World Cup was rugby league's first World Cup and was held between 30 October and 13 November and hosted by France and was won by Great Britain who beat France in the final at the Parc des Princes in Paris. As it was the first official World Cup of either rugby code, it was officially known as the Rugby World Cup.

Five nations were invited to compete: Australia, France, Great Britain, New Zealand and the United States, however the United States withdrew before the group stage draw.

The prime instigators behind the idea of holding a rugby league world cup were the French, who were short of money following the seizure of their assets by French rugby union during the Second World War.

The trophy, which was donated by the French, was worth eight million francs.

== Background ==
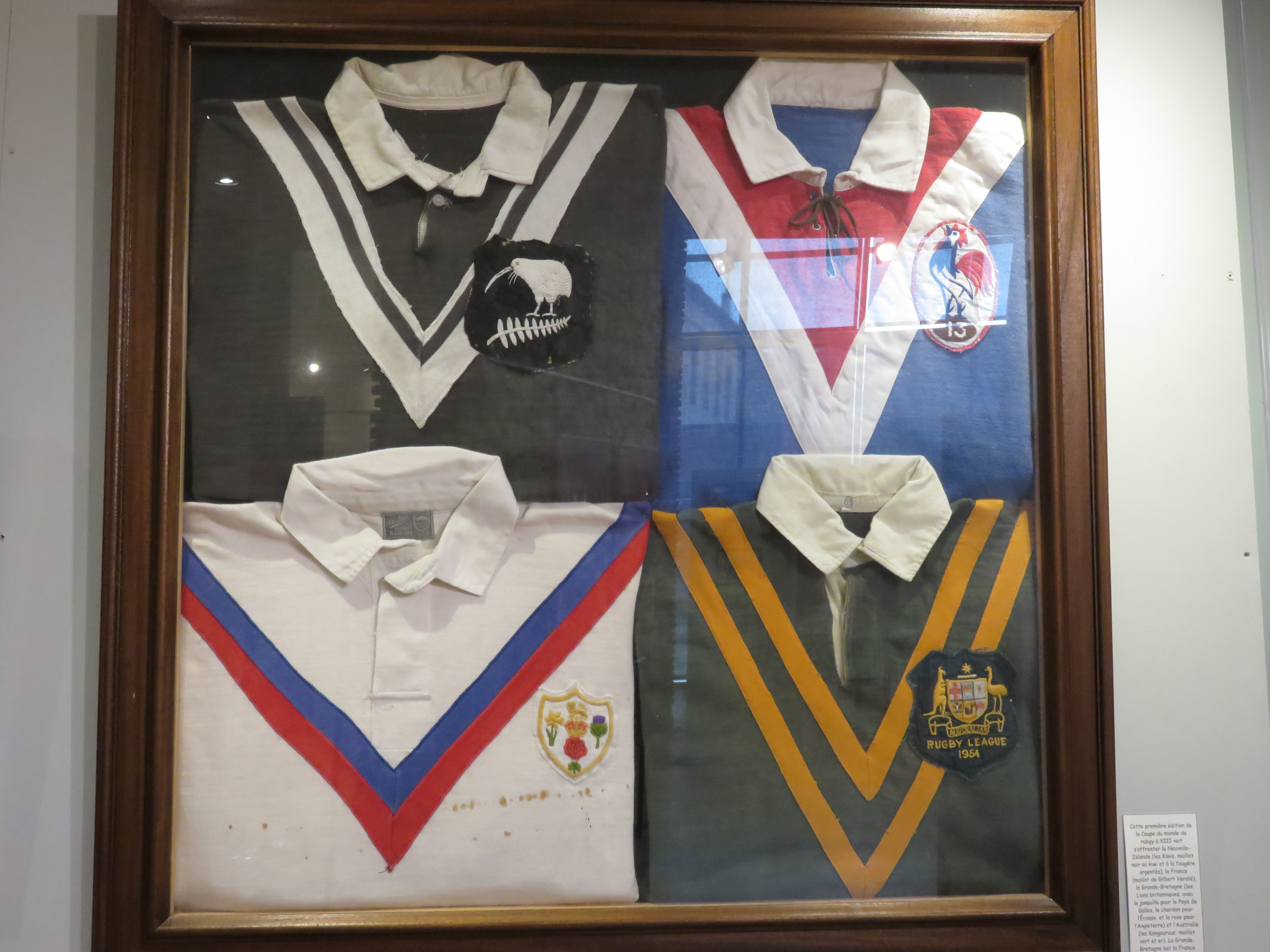
Shirts of the teams in 1954.

The World Cup was a French initiative. Led by Paul Barrière, who donated the Rugby League World Cup trophy himself, they had been campaigning for such a tournament since before the Second World War.

The uncertainty of the ultimate outcome was of particular interest. In the early 1950s all four competing nations were quite capable of beating each other – no test series in the period was a foregone conclusion.

If there were a favourite it was Australia who had just won back the Ashes. However, in 1953 they had lost series to both the French and the Kiwis, while Great Britain had defeated New Zealand on the second half of their 1954 Australasian tour.

The form book merely provided a conundrum which was made more confusing when the British were forced, through injuries and players making themselves unavailable, to select a raw and largely untried squad which was given little credibility by the cynics.

The captains for this historic event were Puig-Aubert (France), Cyril Eastlake (New Zealand), Clive Churchill (Australia) and Dave Valentine (Britain). The referees were Warrington's Charlie Appleton and Rene Guidicelli (Perpignan).

== Participants ==
Five teams were invited to participate in the first World Cup; Australia, Great Britain, New Zealand and the United States along with hosts, France. There were concerns around the United States participation. The American All Stars who had toured Australia and New Zealand and drawn big crowds in 1953 but were heavily beaten in all their games as well as being beaten 31–0 by France in 1954. This led to doubts around whether an American team would be competitive enough to compete, and the United States withdrew from the tournament. When this was announced, the French Rugby League Federation stated their opinion that the United States was not yet up to the standard required for entering a world cup. It was suggested that Wales could replace the United States but were not ultimately invited as Great Britain were already participating.

Several of New Zealand's leading players were not available and missed the tournament. Tommy Baxter, Jimmy Haig, Frank Mulcare, Doug Richards-Jolley and Des White all ruled themselves out of selection.

North America (0)

- ~~United States~~ (withdrew)

Europe (2)

- France (hosts)
- Great Britain

Oceania (2)

- Australia
- New Zealand

== Venues ==
The games were played at various venues in France with the Final played at the Parc des Princes in Paris.

Marseille	Paris	Toulouse	Lyon
Stade Vélodrome	Parc des Princes	Stadium de Toulouse	Stade de Gerland
Capacity: 49,000	Capacity: 38,000	Capacity: 37,000	Capacity: 30,000
1954 Rugby League World Cup (France)		Bordeaux	
1954 Rugby League World Cup (France)		Stade Chaban-Delmas	
1954 Rugby League World Cup (France)		Capacity: 30,000	
1954 Rugby League World Cup (France)		Nantes	
1954 Rugby League World Cup (France)		Stade Marcel-Saupin	
1954 Rugby League World Cup (France)		Capacity: 20,000	

== Group stage ==
Pos	Team	Pld	W	D	L	PF	PA	PD	Pts	Qualification or relegation
1	Great Britain	3	2	1	0	67	32	+35	5	Advance to the Final
2	France	3	2	1	0	50	31	+19	5	Advance to the Final
3	Australia	3	1	0	2	52	58	−6	2	
4	New Zealand	3	0	0	3	34	82	−48	0	

Updated to match(es) played on 11 November 1954. Source: RugbyLeagueProject
Rules for classification: 1) points; 2) point difference; 3) number of points scored

30 October	France	22–13	New Zealand	Parc des Princes, Paris

31 October	Australia	13–28	Great Britain	Stade de Gerland, Lyon

7 November	Australia	34–15	New Zealand	Stade Vélodrome, Marseille

7 November	France	13–13	Great Britain	Stadium de Toulouse, Toulouse

11 November	France	15–5	Australia	Stade Marcel Saupin, Nantes

11 November	Great Britain	26–6	New Zealand	Stade Chaban Delmas, Bordeaux

== Final ==
The 1954 Rugby League World Cup final was the conclusive game of the tournament and was played between France and Great Britain on November 13, 1954, at Parc des Princes, Paris, France.

13 November

France	12–16	Great Britain
Tries: Raymond Contrastin; Vincent Cantoni; Goals: Puig Aubert (3)	Report	Tries: Gerry Helme; Gordon Brown (2); David Rose; Goals: Jimmy Ledgard (2)

Parc des Princes, Paris
Attendance: 30,368
Referee: Charlie Appleton (England)
Player of the Match: Don Robinson (Great Britain)

== Try scorers ==
6

- (United Kingdom) Gordon Brown

5

- (France) Raymond Contrastin

4

- (United Kingdom) David Rose

3

- (Australia) Alex Watson
- (United Kingdom) Gerry Helme
- (United Kingdom) Phil Jackson
- (United Kingdom) Frank Kitchen

2

- (Australia) Ken Kearney
- (Australia) Kel O'Shea
- (Australia) Harry Wells
- (France) Vincent Cantoni

1

- (Australia) Roy Bull
- (Australia) Peter Diversi
- (Australia) Greg Hawick
- (France) Jean Audoubert
- (France) Joseph Crespo
- (France) Guy Delaye
- (France) Joseph Krawzyck
- (France) Jacques Merquey
- (United Kingdom) Jimmy Ledgard
- (New Zealand) Cyril Eastlake
- (New Zealand) Jimmy Edwards
- (New Zealand) Lenny Eriksen
- (New Zealand) Ron McKay
