= Ràdio Arrels =

Radio station in Perpignan, France

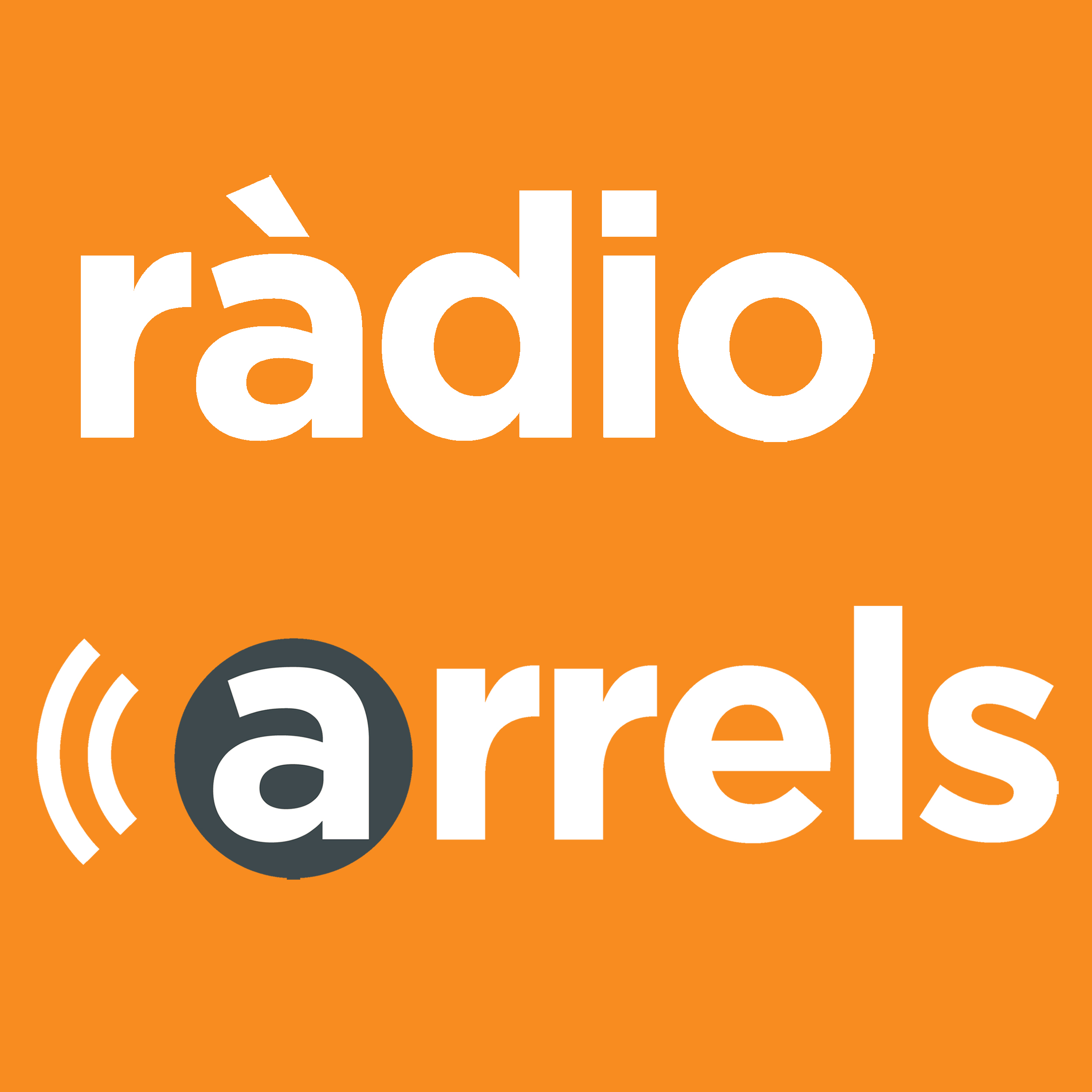

Le Soler, Pyrénées-Orientales; France
- Broadcast area: Northern Catalonia
- Frequencies: Roussillon Plain: 95.0 MHz; Vallespir: 88.2 MHz; Conflent: 95.5 MHz; Cerdanya and Capcir: 93.1 MHz

Programming
- Language: Catalan
- Format: Community radio

Ownership
- Owner: Association Arrels

History
- First air date: 28 May 1981

Links
- Website: www.radioarrels.cat

Ràdio Arrels is a radio station based in Northern Catalonia, France, founded in 1981, which broadcasts in Catalan. The station, an offshoot of the cultural association Arrels, operates daily with five salaried employees and about thirty regular volunteers and broadcasts from four transmitters in the region.

Since its creation, Ràdio Arrels has maintained its status as a community radio station, renouncing advertising revenue. It broadcasts exclusively in Catalan, with a musical programme that places it at the forefront of all stations in the Catalan Countries in terms of daily broadcast of Catalan-language music.

== History ==
Ràdio Arrels began broadcasting on 28 May 1981, during the “free radio” spring of France. From an apartment in the Sant Jaume district of Perpignan, the founders aimed to contribute to the linguistic, social, cultural and national recovery of Northern Catalonia.

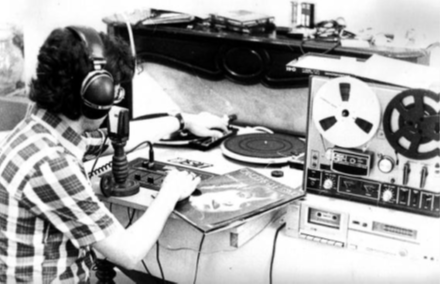
Former Arrels studio

The first official broadcasting authorisation was granted on 1983-12-20. The successive French regulatory authorities — High Authority for Audiovisual Communication, National Commission for Communication and Liberties, Conseil supérieur de l'audiovisuel, and currently the Regulatory Authority for Audiovisual and Digital Communication (ARCOM) — have always renewed the licences. Ràdio Arrels was initially a pirate radio and later a free radio; it now has the status of a community radio station.

The first studio was installed at Plaça del Puig, in the old town of Perpignan. From July 1981 until autumn 1985 the studio was in the village of Cànoes. From 1985 the studios were then installed at the headquarters of the Centre Cultural Català de Perpinyà at 13 bis Carrer Gran de la Moneda.

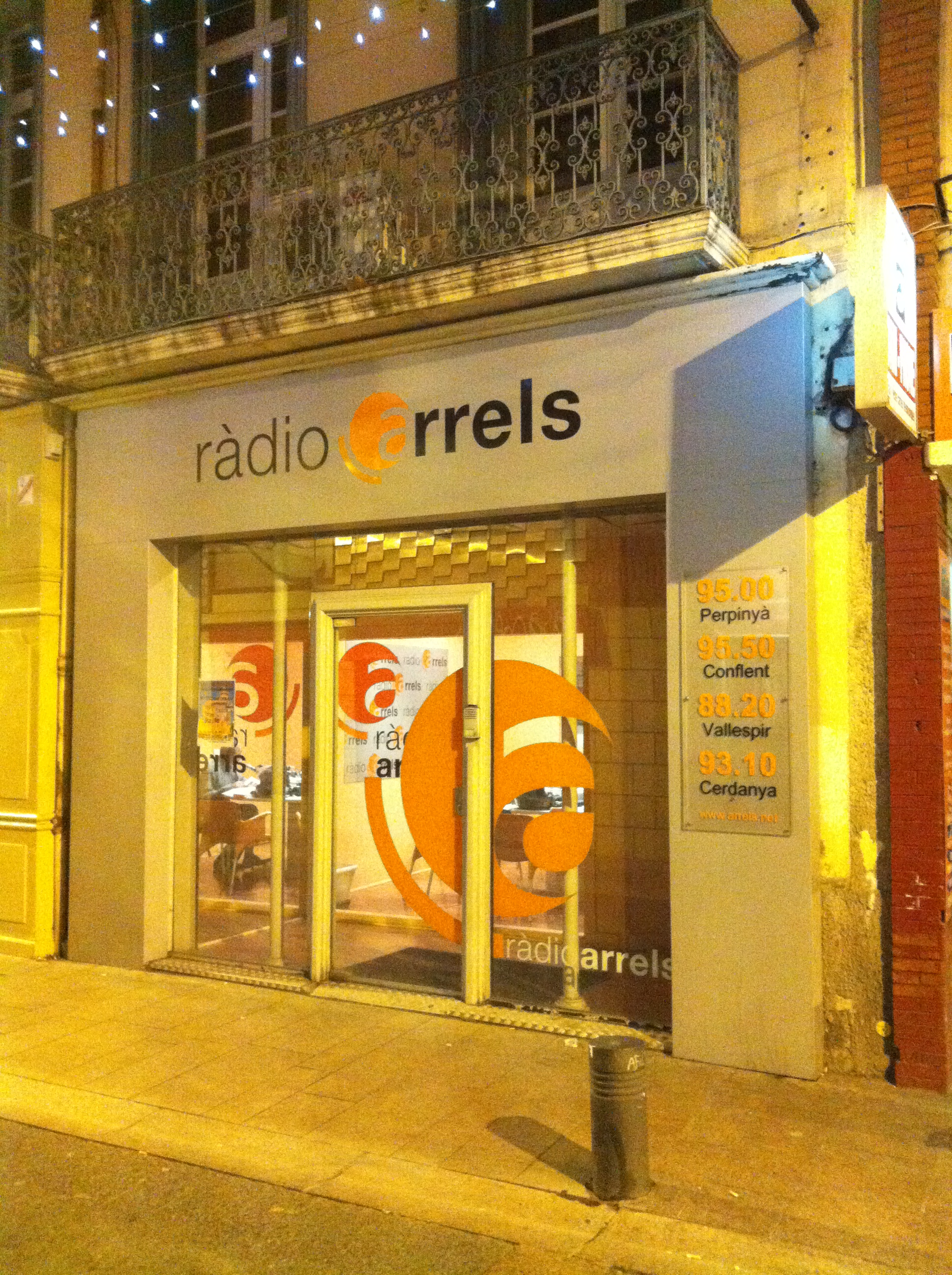
Headquarters of Ràdio Arrels, Carrer dels Agustins, Perpignan

During the summer of 2003, the station moved to new premises on Carrer dels Agustins in central Perpignan. This change represented a major step forward: the studios were located at ground-floor premises on a central street visible to passers-by, making them more accessible and functional for users and guests. It gave greater visibility and allowed the radio to become a key informational medium in Northern Catalonia, with an archive of 27,000 interviews.

In 2013, Ràdio Arrels opened two new production studios in Céret (Vallespir) and Prades (Conflent), with a firm wish to support local communication and be close to citizens, avoiding centralisation. Of these two studios, the one in Prades has developed most so far—thanks to the support of the Casal del Conflent—it produces the daily programme Aires del Conflent, which in 2024 was awarded the Ateneus Award for Associative Communication.

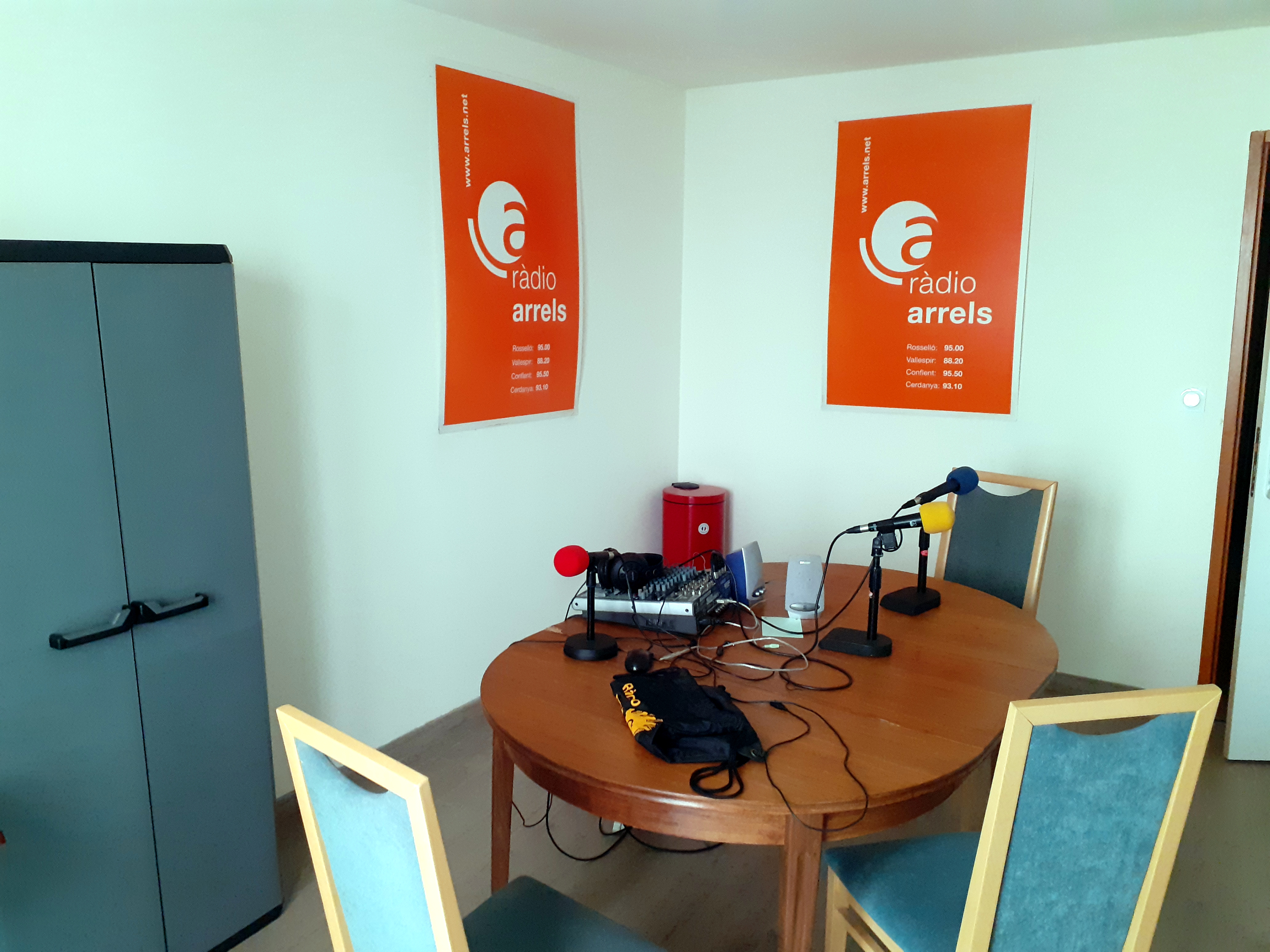
Ràdio Arrels studio in Prades

In 2023, the station moved out of Perpignan and relocated to Le Soler. In the centre of this Roussillon village, it installed its studios in a collaborative space that brings together several local cultural organisations and companies. Here it adopted a new organisational model integrating the studio into the newsroom (a model used by some Anglo-Saxon and French media).

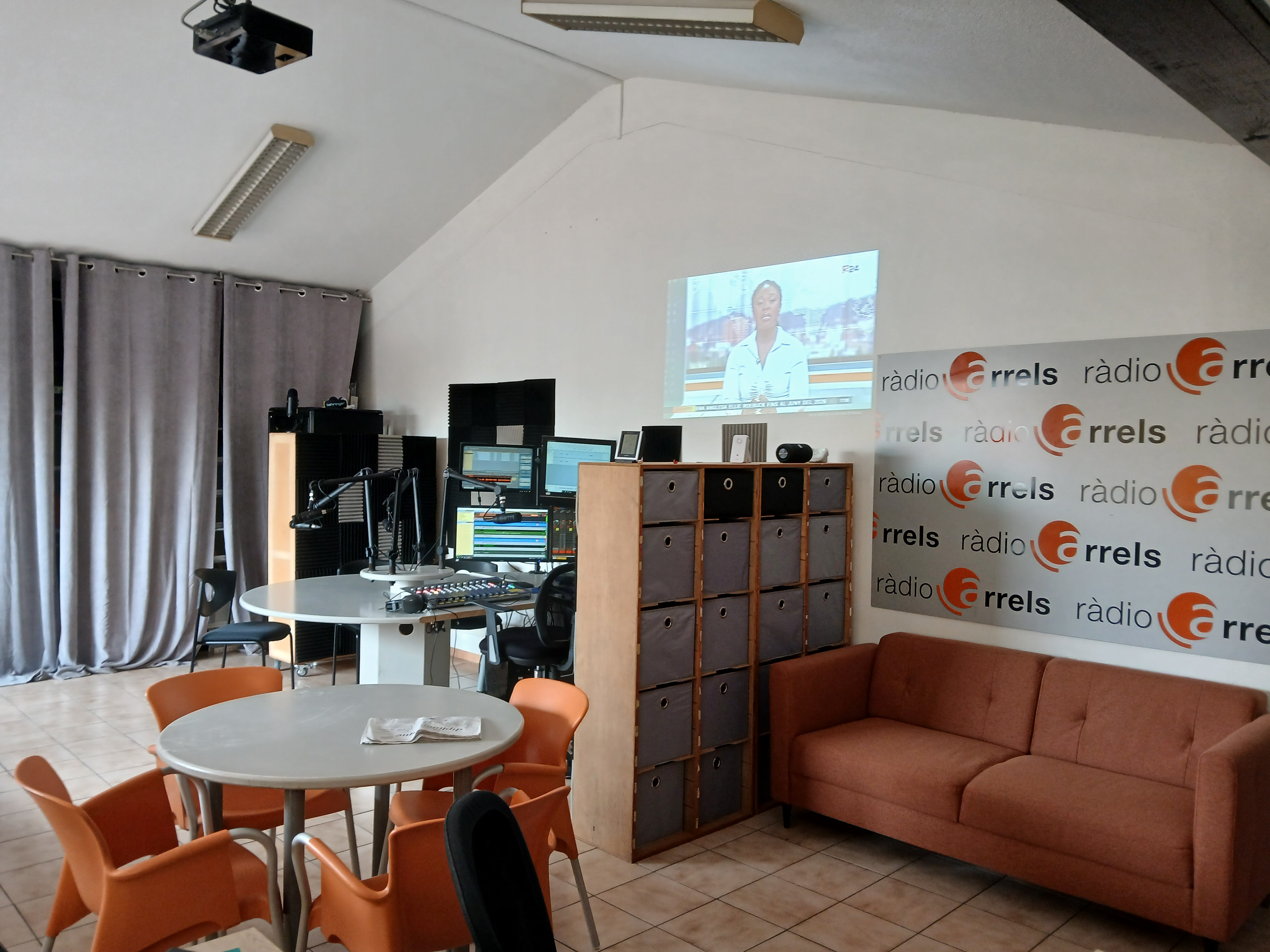
Ràdio Arrels studio in Le Soler

Today the station works in partnership with local associations, aware that they are a key element of social and cultural life. The strength of Ràdio Arrels positively affects these associations, serving as a hub for associative life in Northern Catalonia and as a platform for local activities. Moreover, the station is also expanding its offerings with podcasts and on-demand content, adapting to new audience needs and seeking a younger audience that rarely listens to FM. In this respect, at the end of 2024 Ràdio Arrels launched Catacric-Catacrac, a children’s storytelling podcast produced with the support of the Escoles Arrels.

Ràdio Arrels plays an important role in the dignification of the Catalan language. Hundreds of people express themselves annually in Catalan on the radio — including mayors, politicians, social and economic leaders, artists and athletes. Thus the radio’s function is at once pedagogical, informative, formative, and cultural — disseminating identity, social, cultural and national Catalan values, as well as offering entertainment.

== Funding ==
As a non-commercial radio, Ràdio Arrels requires subsidies and external support to maintain and develop its activities, since it has no own advertising income. The station’s first source of revenue is the French national Fonds de soutien à l’expression radiophonique (fund distributed among the 700 associative radios in France). The Occitanie region and the Departmental Council of the Pyrénées-Orientales also provide significant contributions. The Government of Catalonia has also granted it regular subsidies.

== Frequencies ==
Ràdio Arrels broadcasts on the following frequencies:

- Roussillon Plain: 95.00 FM
- Conflent: 95.50 FM
- Vallespir: 88.20 FM
- Cerdanya and Capcir: 93.10 FM

And also online.

== Awards ==
- 1985: «Banque Populaire» Award for the program La festa de la poma al Conflent
- 1991: Jaume I Honor Award (granted by the Jaume I Foundation)
- 1993: Award for Linguistic Normalization (granted by A.D.A.C. of Girona)
- 1996: Creu de Sant Jordi
- 1997: Graphic Award (by the Festival Animation Group of La Jonquera)
- 2001: Medal of the Faithful City of Perpignan
- 2002: National Broadcasting Award
- 2004: Lluís Companys National Award
- 2006: National Prize of the CIEMEN
- 2006: Premi Canigó (by the Universitat Catalana d'Estiu)
- 2011: Joan Coromines Award (by the Coordinadora d'Associacions per la Llengua Catalana)
- 2016: Gabriel Alomar i Villalonga Award (Obra Cultural Balear)
- 2016: Ramon Casanovas Award for its contribution to the Catalan language in Northern Catalonia (Òmnium Cultural of Vallès Oriental)
- 2022: Martí Gasull i Roig Award (by the Plataforma per la Llengua)
- 2022: Mossèn Albert Vives Journalism Award (Òmnium Alt Urgell)
- 2024: Memorial Coll de Manrella Award
- 2024: Ateneus Award for Associative Communication for the program Aires del Conflent

== Publications ==
- 1989: Video Catalunya Nord a l'abast
- 1992: Book Qui sem els catalans del nord
- 1993: Book Roda la bola compiling radio chronicles by writer Pere Verdaguer i Juanola
- 2002: CD Jacquot, com feiem abans? collecting radio chronicles by Jaume Figuerola and Joan Lhéritier
- 2003: CD Les veus de Catalunya Nord featuring Northern Catalan songs
- 2005: CD Veus poètiques de Catalunya Nord
- 2006: CD Gabriel Escarrà, poeta i pagès
- 2007: CD Entre tradició i modernitat marking the 40th anniversary of the Federació Sardanista del Rosselló
- 2021: Book 40 anys d'Arrels, 40 anys d'un país
