= Comarques of Northern Catalonia =

Most common academic subdivision of the Northern Catalan counties. Toponymy is rendered in French.

Northern Catalonia is traditionally divided into five historical comarques (counties). These counties formed part of the Principality of Catalonia until the territory was incorporated into France following the Treaty of the Pyrenees, with Cerdanya county split between Spain and France. After the French Revolution, the current department of Pyrénées-Orientales was created, comprising the Northern Catalan counties along with part of the Occitan parçan of Fenouillèdes (Fenolhedés).

Although this subdivision finds widespread use in Catalan culture and linguistics, as well as in Catalan-language works and sources in general, it has no administrative status (unlike in Southern Catalonia, where counties are fully official and administrative), as the French state officially subdivides the department into three arrondissements and 31 cantons.

== List of comarques ==
| Location (in the department) | County | French name | County town | Communes | Area |
|---|---|---|---|---|---|
| | Rosselló | Roussillon | Perpinyà | 95 | 1,498 km² |
| | Alta Cerdanya (Note: Alta Cerdanya is the northern half of Cerdanya county, split off from Southern Catalonia, the other half being called Baixa Cerdanya. Its seat, Puigcerdà, is located on the other side of the border. An often-recognised capital for Alta Cerdanya itself is Montlluís, although some alternative divisions, such as the now-outdated alternative division proposed by the Nomenclàtor toponímic de la Catalunya del Nord, place this municipality in Conflent county instead.) | Haute-Cerdagne | None | 26 | 539 km² |
| | Capcir | Capcir | Formiguera | 26 | 177 km² |
| | Conflent | Conflent | Prada de Conflent | 51 | 882 km² |
| | Vallespir | Vallespir | Ceret | 18 | 577 km² |
