= Cabestany =

- Commune
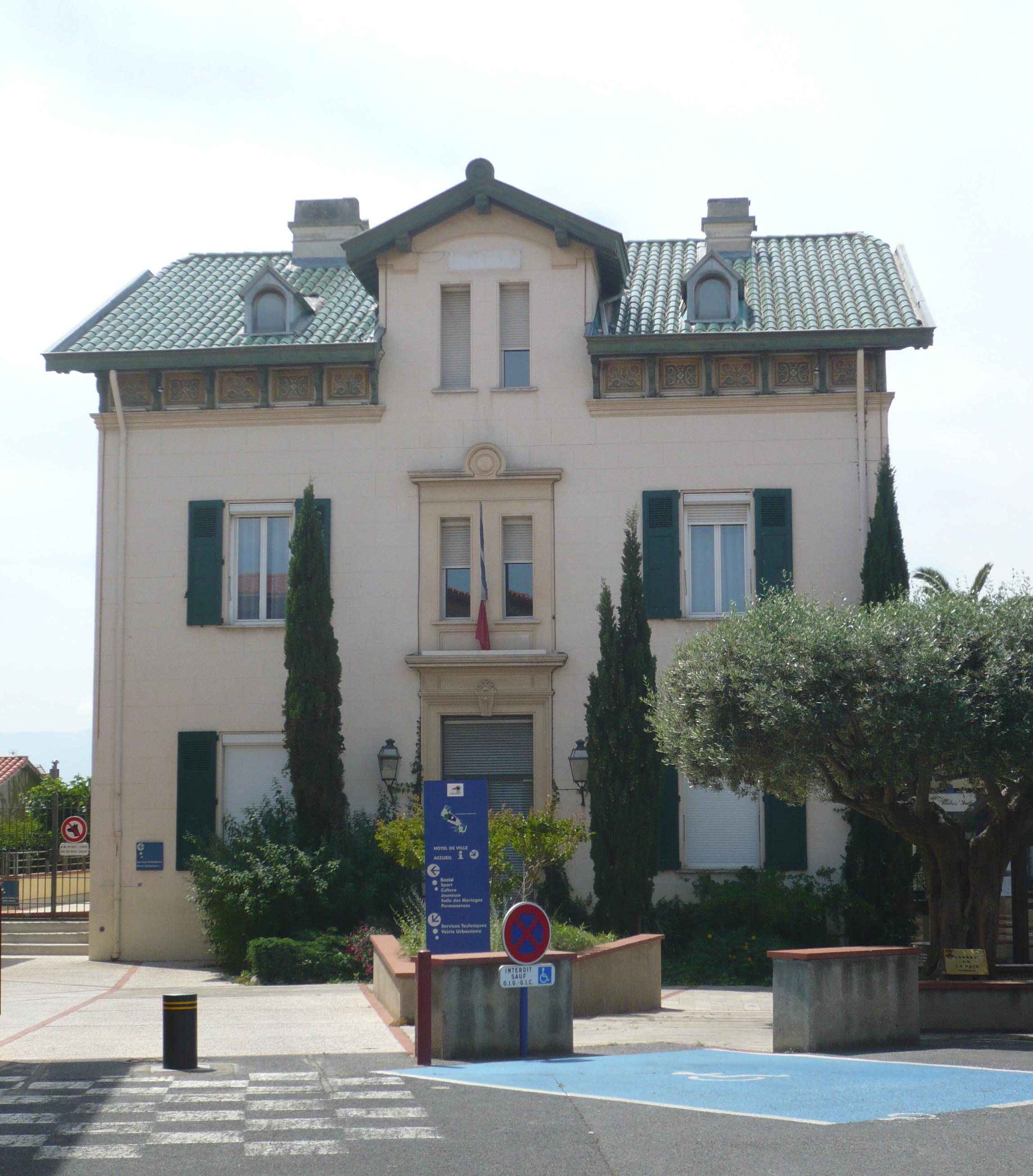
- The town hall in Cabestany

- Coat of arms
- Location of Cabestany
- Location within France Location within Occitanie
- Coordinates: 42°40′52″N 2°56′36″E
- Country: France
- Region: Occitania
- Department: Pyrénées-Orientales
- Arrondissement: Perpignan
- Canton: Perpignan-3
- Intercommunality: Perpignan Méditerranée Métropole

Government
  - Mayor (2026–32): Édith Pugnet
- Area^{1}: 10.42 km^{2} (4.02 sq mi)
- Elevation: 27 m (89 ft)
- Highest elevation: 53 m (174 ft)
- Lowest elevation: 0 m (0 ft)
- Population (2023): 10,465
  - Density: 1,004/km^{2} (2,601/sq mi)
- Demonym: cabestanyenc (ca)
- Time zone: UTC+01:00 (CET)
  - Summer (DST): UTC+02:00 (CEST)
- INSEE/Postal code: 66028 /66330
- Website: ville-cabestany.fr
- ^{1} French Land Register data, which excludes lakes, ponds, glaciers > 1 km^{2} (0.386 sq mi or 247 acres) and river estuaries.

Cabestany (French pronunciation: [kabɛstani]; Catalan pronunciation: [kəβəsˈtaɲ]) is a commune in the Pyrénées-Orientales department in southern France.

== Geography ==
=== Localisation ===
Cabestany is located in the canton of Perpignan-3 and in the arrondissement of Perpignan.

It is part of the Northern Catalan comarca of Rosselló.

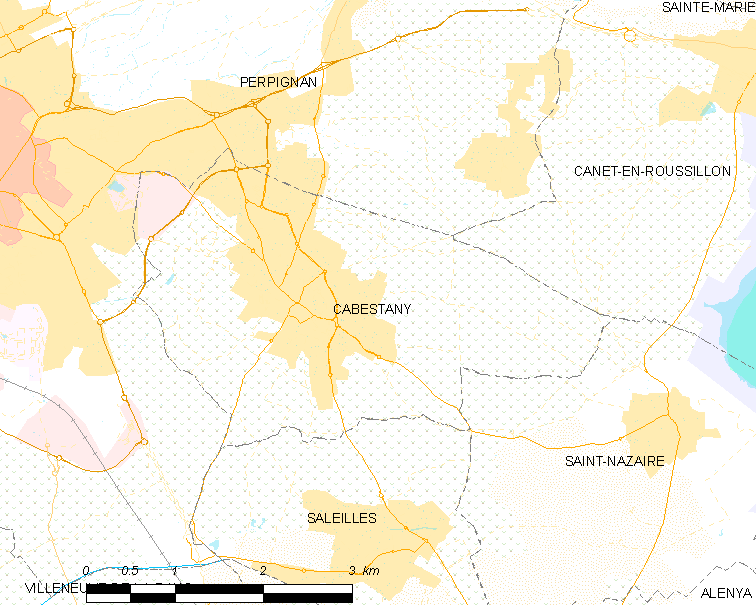
Map of Cabestany and its surrounding communes

== Government and politics ==
=== Mayors ===
Mayor	Term start	Term end
Mare Beille	?	June 1815
Jean Berga	June 1815	?
Jean Vila	1977	2021
Édith Pugnet	2021	Current

== Population ==
Historical population
Year	Pop.	±% p.a.
1968	1,346	—
1975	3,390	+14.11%
1982	6,221	+9.06%
1990	7,513	+2.39%
1999	8,259	+1.06%
2007	8,395	+0.20%
2012	9,399	+2.29%
2017	10,106	+1.46%
2023	10,465	+0.58%
Source: INSEE

== Notable people ==
The Master of Cabestany was from this area, and there is a museum dedicated to his work in the town.

== See also ==
- Communes of the Pyrénées-Orientales department
