= Occitania (administrative region) =

Administrative region of France

Occitania Occitanie (French) Occitània (Occitan) Occitània (Catalan)
- Region
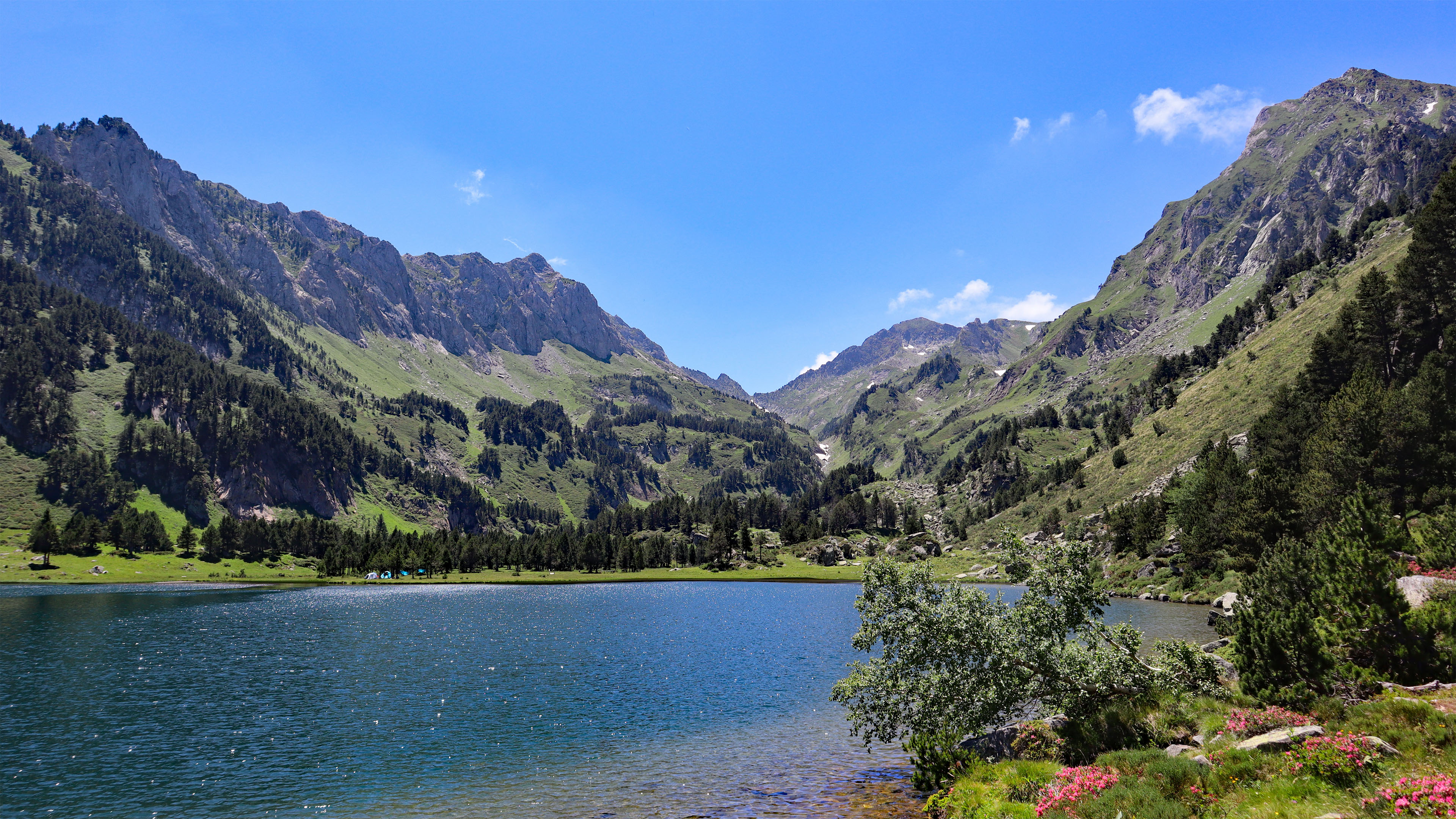
- A view of Artigues in the Pyrenees

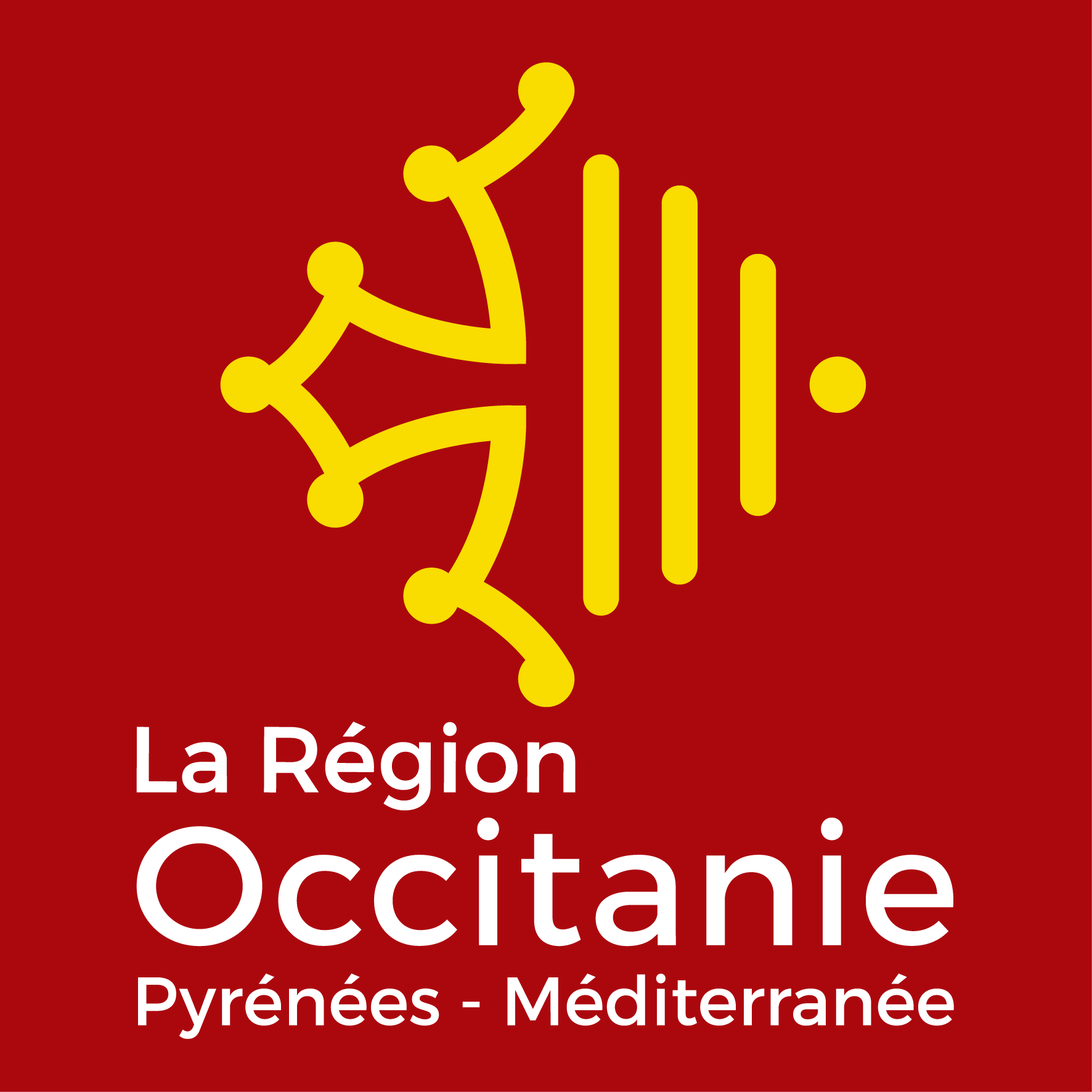
- Coat of arms Brandmark

- Coordinates: 43.7075°N 2.1375°E
- Country: France
- Prefecture: Toulouse
- Departments: 13: Ariège (09); Aude (11); Aveyron (12); Gard (30); Haute-Garonne (31); Gers (32); Hérault (34); Lot (46); Lozère (48); Hautes-Pyrénées (65); Pyrénées-Orientales (66); Tarn (81); Tarn-et-Garonne (82)

Government
  - President of the Regional Council: Carole Delga (PS)

Area
  - Total: 72,724 km^{2} (28,079 sq mi)
  - Rank: 2nd

Population (2023)
  - Total: 6,124,653
  - Density: 84.218/km^{2} (218.12/sq mi)
- Demonym(s): Occitan(s) (masc.), Occitane(s) (fem.) (fr)

GDP
  - Total: €181.273 billion
  - Per capita: €30,900
- Time zone: UTC+01:00 (CET)
  - Summer (DST): UTC+02:00 (CEST)
- ISO 3166 code: FR-OCC

Occitania (French: Occitanie [ɔksitani]; Occitan: Occitània [utsiˈtanjɔ]; Catalan: Occitània [uksiˈtaniə]) is the southernmost administrative region of metropolitan France excluding Corsica, located in the south of the country, created on 1 January 2016 from the former regions of Languedoc-Roussillon and Midi-Pyrénées. The Council of State approved Occitania as the new name of the region on 28 September 2016, coming into effect on 30 September 2016.

The modern administrative region is named after the larger cultural and historical region of Occitania, which corresponds with the southern third of France. The region of Occitania as it is today covers a territory similar to that ruled by the Counts of Toulouse in the 12th and 13th centuries. The banner of arms of the Counts of Toulouse, known colloquially as the Occitan cross, is used by the modern region and is also a popular cultural symbol. In 2022, Occitania had a population of 6,080,731.

== Toponymy ==
The County of Toulouse in 1154 (shown in blue)

Enacted in 2014, the territorial reform of French regions had been subject to debate for many years. The reform law used as the new region's provisional name, the hyphenated names of its predecessors: Languedoc-Roussillon and Midi-Pyrénées, in alphabetical order. As for most of the merged regions, a permanent name was then proposed by the new regional council to replace that provisional name. On 24 June 2016, the Regional Council of Languedoc-Roussillon-Midi-Pyrénées adopted the name Occitania after lengthy public consultation. The provisional name of the region was withdrawn on 30 September 2016, when the new name took effect.

Occitania, the new name, derives from the historical appellation of the broader region, and refers to the historical use throughout that territory of the Occitan language and its various dialects, which are so named for the word òc, the Occitan word for oui or "yes". The circa 450,000 French Catalans living in the region (or Catalans of the North, as they mostly call themselves) expressed dismay at the regional assembly resolution, regarding the new name as ignoring their presence. On 10 September 2016, some 10,000 people (7,800 according to the police) demonstrated in Perpignan, demanding that the merged region name contain the words Pays catalan (literal translation: "Catalan country").

== Geography ==
Occitania is the second-largest region in mainland France, covering an area of 72,724 km^{2} (28,079 sq mi); it has a population of 5,845,102 (2017). It has a Mediterranean coast on the southeast and is neighboured by Provence-Alpes-Côte d'Azur on the east, Auvergne-Rhône-Alpes on the northeast and Nouvelle-Aquitaine on the west and northwest, as well as foreign borders of Andorra (Canillo, Encamp, La Massana, Ordino) and Spain (Aragon and Catalonia) on the south.

=== Departments ===
Code	Arms ^{1}	Department	Prefecture	Named after	Population (2022)
09	Coat of arms of department 09	Ariège	Foix	Ariège River	155,339
11	Coat of arms of department 11	Aude	Carcassonne	Aude River	377,773
12	Coat of arms of department 12	Aveyron	Rodez	Aveyron River	279,736
30	Coat of arms of department 30	Gard	Nîmes	Gardon River	764,010
31	Coat of arms of department 31	Haute-Garonne	Toulouse	Garonne River	1,456,261
32	Coat of arms of department 32	Gers	Auch	Gers River	192,649
34	Coat of arms of department 34	Hérault	Montpellier	Hérault River	1,217,331
46	Coat of arms of department 46	Lot	Cahors	Lot River	175,620
48	Coat of arms of department 48	Lozère	Mende	Mont Lozère	76,503
65	Coat of arms of department 65	Hautes-Pyrénées	Tarbes	Pyrenees	231,453
66	Coat of arms of department 66	Pyrénées-Orientales	Perpignan	Pyrenees	492,964
81	Coat of arms of department 81	Tarn	Albi	Tarn River	396,168
82	Coat of arms of department 82	Tarn-et-Garonne	Montauban	Tarn River and Garonne River	264,924

=== Major communities ===
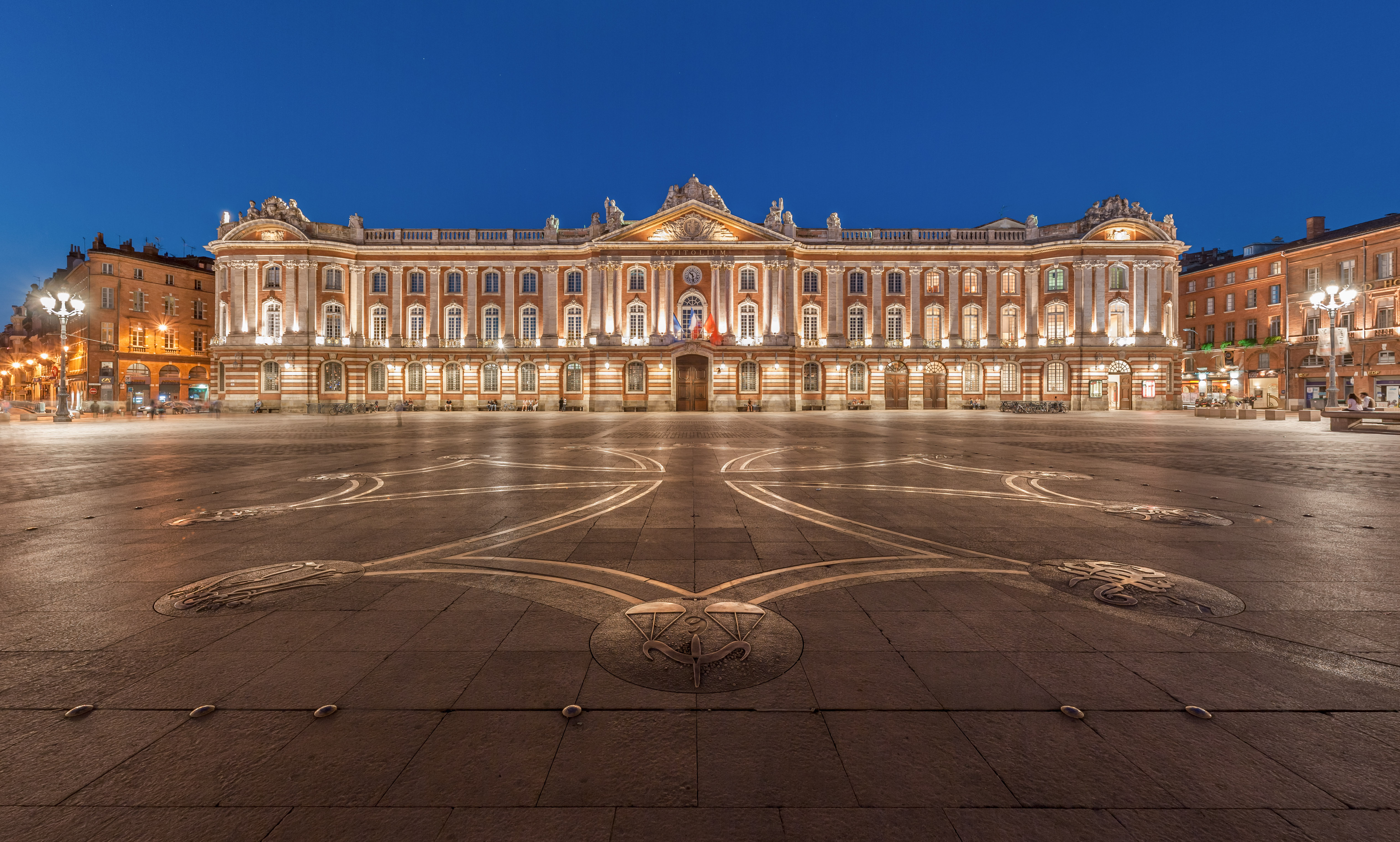
Toulouse, Occitania's prefecture and largest city

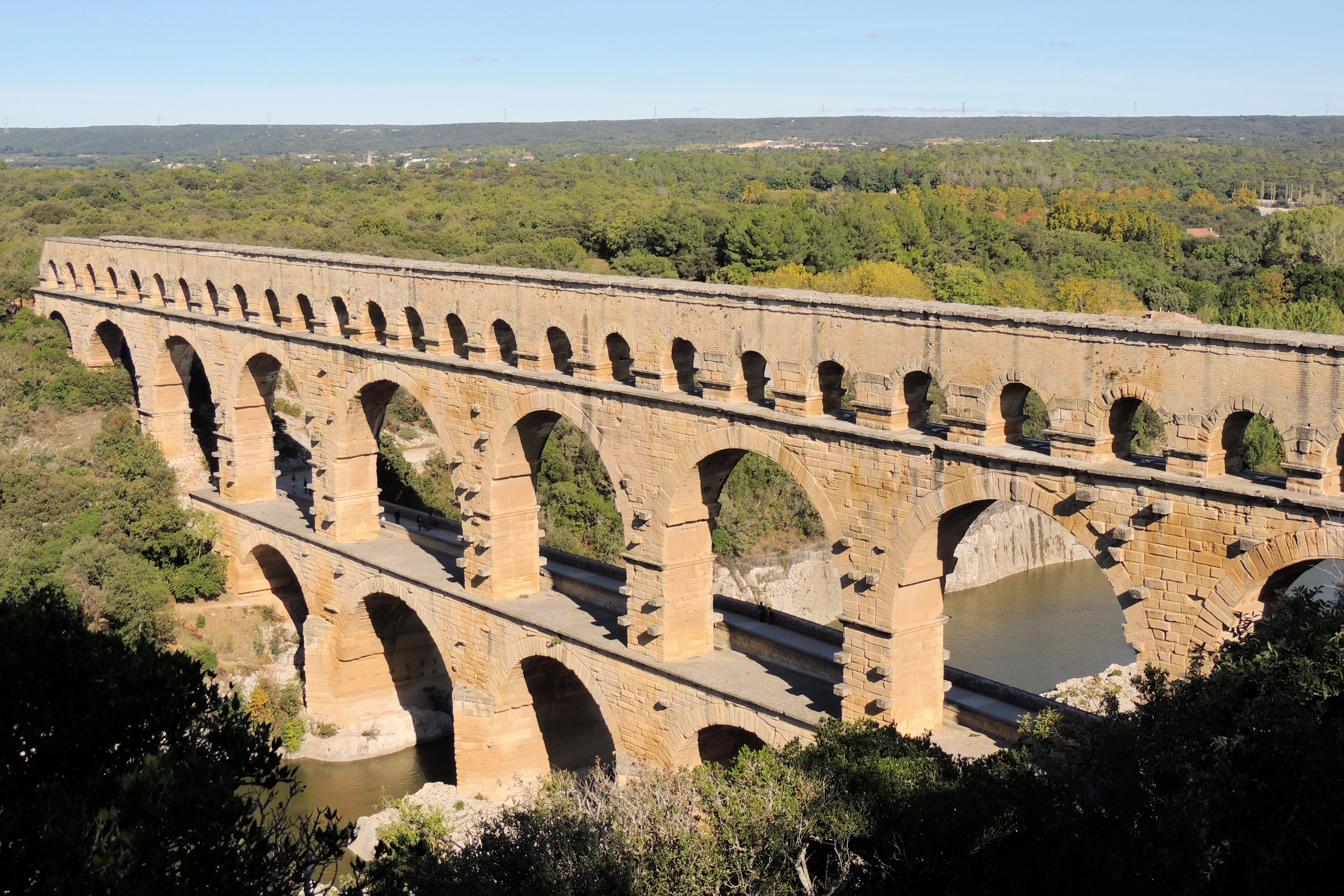
The Pont du Gard from the Roman Era, one of Occitanie's main landmarks and tourist attractions

The largest communes of Occitania are (population as of 2022):

- Toulouse (511,684)
- Montpellier (307,101)
- Nîmes (150,444)
- Perpignan (120,996)
- Béziers (80,815)
- Montauban (62,487)
- Narbonne (56,692)
- Albi (50,605)
- Carcassonne (46,429)

== Economy ==
The gross domestic product (GDP) of the region was 171.2 billion euros in 2018, accounting for 7.3% of French economic output. GDP per capita adjusted for purchasing power was 26,000 euros or 86% of the EU27 average in the same year. The GDP per employee was 102% of the EU average.

=== Economy of Midi-Pyrénées before merger ===
Before the reform of the administrative regions, Midi-Pyrénées was the largest region of France by area. In 2006 its total GDP was $87.915 billion for a population of 2,755,000. It had a GDP per capita of $32,519 a year with an unemployment of 8.9%, the GDP per employment equal to $80,103 a year.

Primary sector: Because of its size Midi-Pyrénées has the largest number of farms of all France with 60,000 farms in active use. It has also the largest amount of land readily usable with 2.6 million hectares. This is however being reduced by both the increasing population and the CAP. The departments of the Gers, Aveyron, Lot and Tarn-et-Garonne have the most significant agricultural activity of the region. Wine production has suffered in recent years from declining demand, reducing prices and over-production. There are 19 AOC wines in the region. A policy of merging producers into wider groups has been initiated.

Secondary sector: The second largest part of the industrial production of the region is the food industry. 4.6bn Euros are generated each year from agriculture. It is however evolving as it received the fourth largest amount of foreign investment of France and is the region of France that created the largest number of enterprises in 2005 with 14,398 new enterprises. Excluding the construction and civil engineering field the secondary sector uses 15% of the regional resources. Several multinational companies are headquartered or have major offices in the region such as: Airbus, EADS, Alcatel, Siemens, Bosch and Pierre Fabre. The aerospace industry is an important source of income for the region and employs 57,000 people. Moreover, more than 3,000 suppliers form part of the engineering, electronic, telecommunication and computing infrastructure for this industry. However, there is a large restructuring plan ongoing and about 10,000 new jobs are expected to be lost outright and partners will be regrouped into larger entities.

Tertiary sector: The region has been behind the other French regions for a long time on services. However this has changed a lot in the recent years and there are many important consulting and telemarketing companies based in the area or with important offices, such as Orange, IBM and CapGemini. It is Toulouse, the largest city and capital, that currently concentrates the largest amount of employment however with the progressive extensions of transportation this has been grown considerably in recent years. In late 2006 a large plan was initiated to replace older train, the circulation of regional train has kept on increasing and has now reach the amount of ten million journeys each year. With 80,000 students and 15,000 scientists divided into 400 laboratories the region ranks in France's top three for scientific research. Technology transfers to small-business-enterprises is therefore substantial. Tourism is an important source of incomes for the region, partly due to a sunny climate and the presence of the Pyrénées, as well as the presence of Lourdes, an important pilgrimage site.

== Culture ==
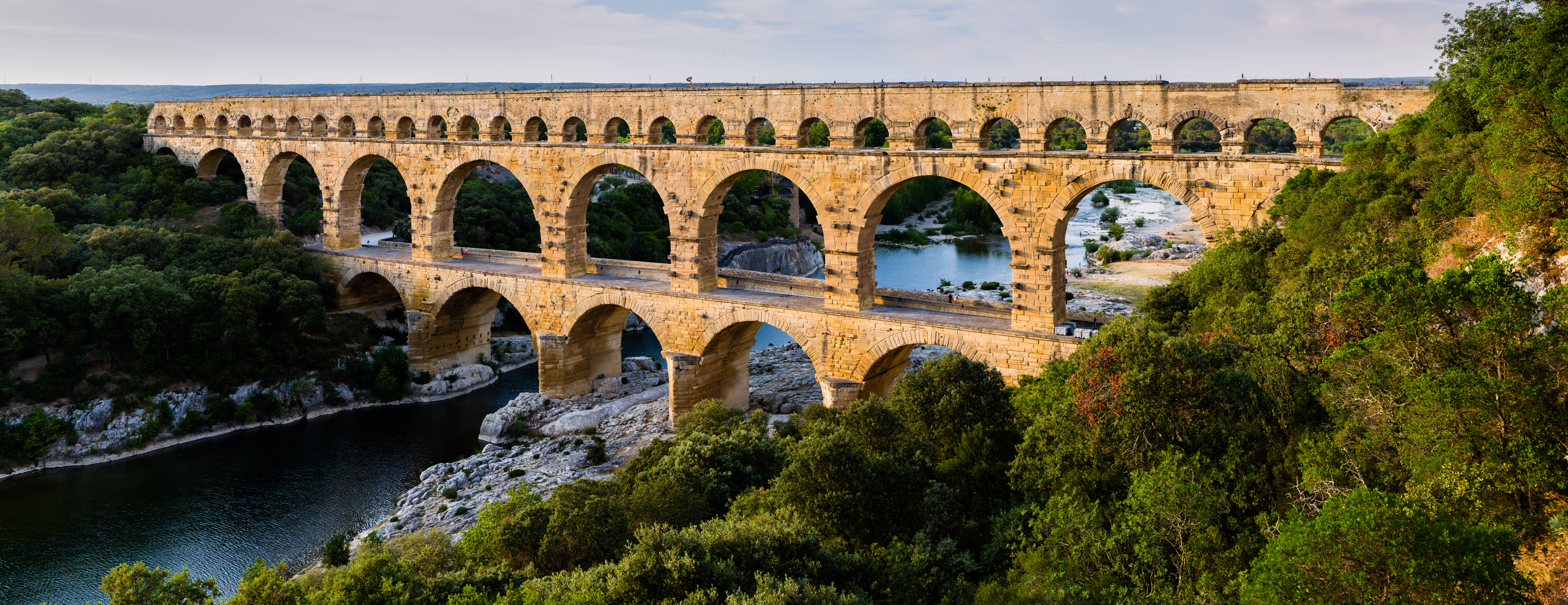
Pont du Gard aqueduct near Nîmes

=== Language ===
Prior to the 20th century, Occitan was the language spoken in Languedoc, and Catalan was the language spoken in Roussillon. Both have been under pressure from French. In 2004, research conducted by the Government of Catalonia showed that 65% of adults over the age of 15 in Roussillon could understand Catalan whereas 37% stated they were able to speak it.

In recent years there have been attempts at reviving of both languages, including Catalan-medium schooling through the La Bressola schools.

=== Literature ===
Occitan literature – still sometimes called Provençal literature – is a body of texts written in Occitan in what is nowadays the South of France. It originated in the poetry of the eleventh- and twelfth-century troubadours, and inspired the rise of vernacular literature throughout medieval Europe.

=== Music ===
Aimeric de Peguilhan, Giraut de Bornelh and Bertran de Born were major influences in troubadour composition, in the High Middle Ages. The troubadour tradition is considered to have originated in the region.

The Romantic music composer Déodat de Séverac was born in the region, and, following his schooling in Paris, returned to the region to compose. He sought to incorporate the music indigenous to the area in his compositions.

=== Wine ===
The Languedoc-Roussillon region is dominated by 740,300 acres (2,996 km^{2}) of vineyards, three times the combined area of the vineyards in Bordeaux and the region has been an important winemaking centre for several centuries. Grapevines are said to have existed in the South of France since the Pliocene period - before the existence of Homo sapiens. The first vineyards of Gaul developed around two towns: Béziers and Narbonne. The Mediterranean climate and plentiful land with soil ranging from rocky sand to thick clay was very suitable for the production of wine, and it is estimated that one in ten bottles of the world's wine was produced in this region during the 20th century (Robinson 1999:395). Despite this enormous quantity, the area's significance was often overlooked by scholarly publications and commercial journals, largely because very little of the wine being produced was classified under an appellation contrôlée until the 1980s (Joseph 2005:190).

Several entrepreneurs such as Robert Skalli and James Herrick drastically changed the face of the region, planting more commercially viable grape varieties and pushing for new AOC classifications. While the AOC system has origins in the 15th century, the Languedoc-Roussillon has some appellations like the Cabardès which have existed by law only since 1999 (Joseph 2005:190).

The region is the largest contributor to the European Union's glut (dominance of supply over demand) of wine known as the wine lake.

The Languedoc-Roussillon region has adopted a marque to help market its products, in particular, but not limited to, wine. The Sud de France (Southern France) marque was adopted in 2006 to help customers abroad not familiar with the Appellation system to recognise those wines that originated in the L-R area, but the marque is also used for other products, including cheeses, olive oils and pies.

=== Sport ===
Languedoc-Roussillon has been a major center of Rugby league in France since the sport was introduced to the country in the 1930s. The region is also home to the rugby union teams AS Béziers Hérault, RC Narbonne and USA Perpignan. Since the following years of the retirement of this region, the popularity has gone down.

Montpellier is home to Montpellier HSC, which was founded in 1974 and plays in the Ligue 1, the French top division. It won the French Championship after the 2011/12 season. Home matches are played at the Stade La Mosson, named after the area where it is located, with a capacity of 31,250. It was built in 1998.

== Transport ==
The region's biggest airports are Toulouse–Blagnac Airport and Montpellier–Méditerranée Airport. There are some smaller airports such as Perpignan–Rivesaltes Airport, Carcassonne Airport and Rodez–Aveyron Airport.

== Politics ==
Following the creation of the region in 2016, Carole Delga, a member of the Socialist Party, was elected to the presidency of the Regional Council of Occitania. The Hôtel de région, where the Regional Council of Occitania meets, is situated in Toulouse.

== Historical identity ==
Map of the new region with its thirteen departments, coloured according to the historical provinces as they existed until the aftermath of the French Revolution (1790). Languedoc Guyenne and Gascony County of Foix Roussillon

The historic cultural area of Occitania (red line) and the current administrative regions of Southern France.

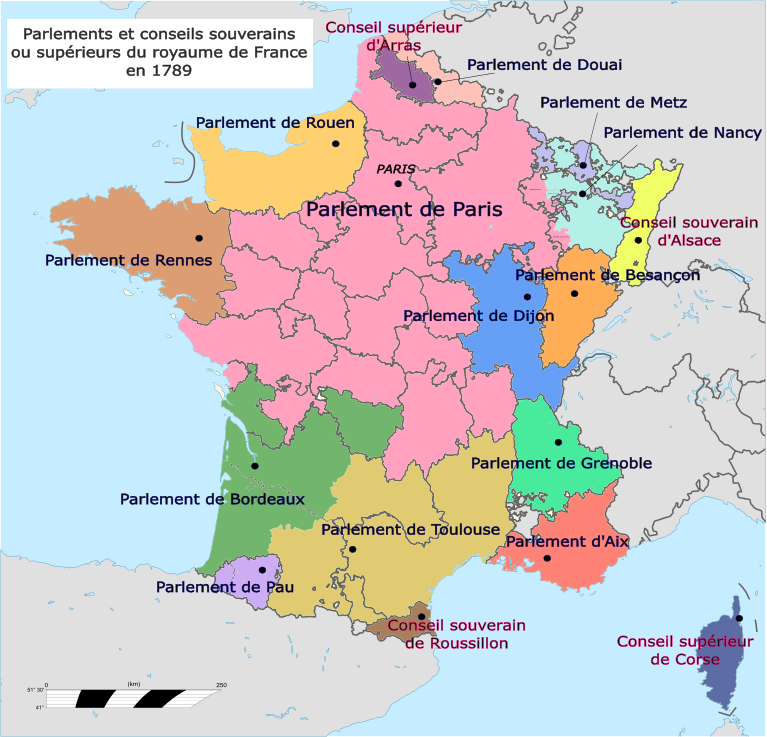
From the 15th to the 18th century, the jurisdiction of the Parlement of Toulouse extended over a territory very similar to that of the current Occitania region.

The new administrative region includes provinces and territories of diverse cultural and historical origin: Languedoc (High and Low Languedoc), Països Catalans (Roussillon, Cerdanya, Vallespir, Conflent, Capcir), the County of Foix, and the eastern parts of what was formerly Gascony (Armagnac, Comminges, Couserans, Bigorre, Condomois, Nébouzan, Rivière-Verdun), and Guiana (Carcin, Roergue). During the Ancien Régime, most of these territories lay within the jurisdiction of the Parlement of Toulouse, founded in 1443.

=== Occitania ===
Occitania (Occitània or Óucitanìo in Occitan) is a historical region of southwestern Europe in which Occitan language was the main vernacular language. This territory was already united, in Roman times first as the Diocese of Vienne and then as the Seven Provinces (Septem Provinciae) and in Aquitaine at the beginning of the Middle Ages (Aquitanica, Visigoth kingdom of Toulouse), before the Frankish conquest. Occitania is characterized by "the Occitan culture", since the Middle Ages another expression of Romance culture in France and to a lesser extent in Italy, Spain and Monaco. It is presented and recognized on institutional sites of French communities, such as those of the Lot-et-Garonne County Council and the city of Agen.

=== Languedoc ===
The blazon of the counts of Toulouse and Languedoc: the Occitan cross gold on gules.

Most of the territory that came to be called Languedoc (the region where langue d'oc is spoken; in Occitan Lengadòc, pronounced [ˌleŋɡɔˈðɔ(k)]) became attached to the Kingdom of France in the 13th century, following the Albigensian Crusade (1208–1229). This crusade aimed to put an end to what the Catholic Church considered the Cathar heresy, and enabled the Capetian dynasty to extend its influence south of the Loire. As part of this process, the former principalities of Trencavel (the Viscounty of Albi, Carcassona, Besièrs, Agde and Nimes) were integrated into the Royal French Domain in 1224. The Counts of Toulouse followed them in 1271. The remaining feudal enclaves were absorbed progressively up to the beginning of the 16th century; the County of Gévaudan in 1258, the County of Melgueil (Mauguiò) in 1293, the Lordship of Montpellier in 1349 and the Viscounts of Narbonne in 1507.

The territory falling within the jurisdiction of the Estates of Languedoc, which convened for the first time in 1346, shrank progressively, becoming known during the Ancien Régime as the province of Languedoc.

The year 1359 marked a turning point in the history of the province. The three bailiwicks (sénéchaussées) of Bèucaire, Carcassona and Tolosa had the status of bonnes villes (towns granted privileges and protection by the king of France in return for providing a contingent of men at arms). In that year, the three entered into a perpetual union, after which their contribution of royal officers was summoned jointly rather than separately for each of the three sénéchaussées.

Towards the end of the 14th century, the term "country of the three seneschalties" (pays des trois sénéchaussées), later to become known as Languedoc, designated the two bailiwicks of Bèucaire-Nimes and Carcassona, and the eastern part of Tolosa (Toulouse), retained under the Treaty of Brétigny. At that time, the County of Foix, which belonged to the seneschal of Carcassona until 1333 before passing to Toulouse, ceased to belong to Languedoc. In 1542, the province was divided into two généralités: Toulouse for Haut-Languedoc, and Montpellier for Bas-Languedoc. This lasted until the French Revolution in 1789. From the 17th century onward, there was only one intendance for the whole of Languedoc, with its seat in Montpellier.

=== Haute-Guyenne ===
Coat of arms of the duchies of Aquitaine and Guyenne, taken again by the province of Guyenne, of gules with a leopard of gold

The former provinces of Gascony (in Gascon Gasconha, Occitan pronunciation: [ɡasˈkuɲɔ]), and Guyenne; in Occitan Guiana [ˈɡjanɔ]) were historically part of the Great South-West of France (Grand Sud-Ouest français), and derived from the medieval duchies of Vasconia, Aquitaine and then Guyenne. Today, only the eastern regions of the two provinces are part of Occitania. These areas correspond essentially to the territories acquired by the kings of England, dukes of Guyenne, under the treaty of Brétigny of 1360, and which then remained under the jurisdiction of the provincial appellate court of Toulouse (Parlement of Toulouse) after the creation of the Parlement of Bordeaux in 1462. From that time, they were generally grouped under the name of Haute-Guyenne, by opposition with Basse-Guyenne, which was dependent on the Parlement of Bordeaux.

Coat of arms of the former province of Gascogne, quartered azure a lion of silver and gules a sheaf of wheat azure bound gold, was created for Louis XIV: it refers to the lion of counts of Armagnac

The territory of the former province of Guyenne (Guiana) that lies within the region corresponds with Quercy (the current department of Lot and the north of Tarn e Garona), and with Roergue (Avairon). These two counties are thus part of the Occitan linguistic area, in its Languedocien dialectal variant. They were possessions of the Counts of Toulouse from the 9th century, at various stages a minor branch or the main branch. Like the other possessions of the Counts of Toulouse, they were integrated for the first time with the French royal domain in 1271, and then yielded to the kings of England under the 1360 Treaty of Brétigny. The province of Quercy was definitely reunited with the Crown in 1472; Roergue, possession of the counts of Armagnac, did not follow until 1607. Both came within the province of Guyenne, under military rule from 1561. Together, they became the généralité of Montauban from 1635, which then became the province of Haute-Guyenne in 1779. Today, the name Guyenne no longer has administrative or political currency, although the Haut-Agenais used the term Pais de Guiana in a campaign which evoked its historical identity to promote the Lot-et-Garonne and part of the valley of Dròt. This reference is now superseded in the promotion of tourism by the designation Pais del Dròt. The appellations Quercy and Roergue, in contrast, retain a strong identity.

Gascony is the former province located on the territory of the current departments of Gers (Armanhac and Condomois), Hautes-Pyrénées (Bigorre), Lanas in the neighboring region, and parts of other departments of the two regions of Aquitània and Midi-Pyrénées (Comenge, Nebosan and Rivière-Verdun mainly in the south and west of Haute-Garonne, and Couserans in the western part of Ariège). Successively called Aquitania, Novempopulania, Vasconia (territory of the Vascones) and Gascony in the 13th century, the territory was geographically diverse, situated between the Atlantic Ocean, Garona and the Pyrenees. Claiming a cultural identity based on evolving occupation, from the Aquitani peoples of Proto-Basque language to a Gascon population sharing a latinized Occitan dialect, it constitutes the current Gascon linguistic area. Between the 15th and the beginning of the 16th centuries, it was progressively integrated into the Royal French domain. Comenge yielded to the kings of France in 1443, extinguishing the local dynasty. Armagnac, Bigorre and Nebosan followed, with the county of Foix, in 1607.

=== County of Foix (Fois) ===
The County of Foix is an old French county created out of the County of Carcassonne in around 1050 for Bernard Roger, son of Roger I of Carcassonna. In 1398, the county passed to House of Grailly and, in 1458, King Charles VII of France raised it to the Peerage of France in favor of Gaston IV, Count of Foix.

The county-peerage passed to the House of Albret in 1484, and then to House of Bourbon-Vendôme in 1548. In 1607, King Henry IV of France attached the county to the Royal French domain.

From the time of the French Revolution, the county was fully incorporated into the department of Ariège. The Occitan dialect traditionally spoken there is Languedocien.

=== Roussillon ===
Roussillon's coat of arms refers to the coat of arms of the Crown of Aragon

The Ancien Régime province of Roussillon, which had formerly been integrated with the Catalan counties, the Kingdom of Majorca, and the Principality of Catalonia within the Crown of Aragon, was attached to the Crown of France under the Treaty of the Pyrenees, signed on 7 November 1659. Prior to this treaty, the border between the kingdom of France and the Principality of Catalonia lay further north, along a line of citadels (Treaty of Corbeil).

These territories corresponded to the Catalan counties of Roussillon and Conflent, founded in the 9th century, as well as to the northern part of the County of Cerdanya, to which was added the former Vicounty of Castelnou, or Vallespir (the pagus of County of Besalú, united with the County of Roussillon in 1209). The new Province of Roussillon also known simply as Roussillon, brought together the medieval administrative courts, or vigueries, of Roussillon, Conflent, and the north of the County of Cerdanya which were part of the government structure of the Crown of Aragon's (and attached to the Principality of Catalonia) counties of Roussillon and Cerdanya (governació dels comtats de Rosselló i Cerdanya in Catalan) at the time of their attachment to France. Roussillon was subject to direct taxation as a pays d'imposition (taxing country) and did not have representation through the Estates (a provincial assembly, the provincial assembly of Roussillon, was created on 15 August 1787). It formed both a government and an intendance and reported to the Secretary of State for War as a border province. It had sovereign jurisdiction: the Sovereign Council of Roussillon, independent of the Parlement of Toulouse.

Currently, the name Roussillon is still the most widely used to designate this territory, being found in the denomination of the former region of Languedoc-Roussillon.

Today, the territory is often subdivided into five unofficial traditional and natural comarques: Roussillon proper, Vallespir, Conflent, Upper Cerdanya and Capcir. A recent addition is Fenouillèdes, the Occitan part of the department of Pyrénées-Orientales.

== Notable people ==
=== Writers ===
- Paul Valéry (1871–1945), writer, philosopher, poet and epistemologist.
- Claude Simon (1913–2005), writer, born in Madagascar, was brought up in Perpignan and throughout his life showed a real attachment to the Catalan land. He spent part of his last years in his home in Salses-le-Château.
- Malika Mokeddem, born in Algeria in 1949, she continued her medical doctorate, begun in Oran, in Paris in 1977. Based in Montpellier, she is the author of L'interdite and Je owe tout à ton oublie. Her works are inspired by her personal journey.
- Max Roqueta (1908–2005), poet and writer in Occitan. He created the French Tambourine Federation (French: Fédération française de tambourin).
- Joseph Delteil (1894–1978), poet and writer; he was the friend of Georges Brassens and Pierre Soulages.
- Jean Joubert (1928–2015), poet and writer for both youth and adults, wrote Arche de la parole (transl. The ark of speech) and Le chien qui savait lire (transl. The dog who could read). He received the Prix Renaudot in 1975 for L'Homme de sable (transl. The sand man).
- Alphonse Daudet (1840–1897), writer and playwright, born in Nîmes and grew up in Bezouce.
- Robèrt Lafont (1923–2009), poet and writer in Occitan, essayist, linguist

=== Illustrators ===
- Albert Dubout (1905–1976) studied at the School of Fine Arts in Montpellier and became the illustrator of many national newspapers, then the poster designer and designer. He very often parodied the little train linking Montpellier to Palavas-les-Flots where a museum is dedicated to him.

=== Singers ===
- Georges Brassens, born in Sète
- Charles Trenet, born in Narbonne
- Patric, Occitan singer
- Olivia Ruiz, born in Carcassonne
- Cali, originally from Vernet-les-Bains
- Boby Lapointe, born in Pézenas
- Julien Doré, born in Alès
- Ricoune, singer-songwriter

=== Comedians ===
- Rémi Gaillard
- Mathieu Madénian

== See also ==
- Association internationale d'études occitanes
- Languedoc-Roussillon
- Midi-Pyrénées
- Occitania
- Regions of France
