= Master of Cabestany =

12th-century sculptor in France

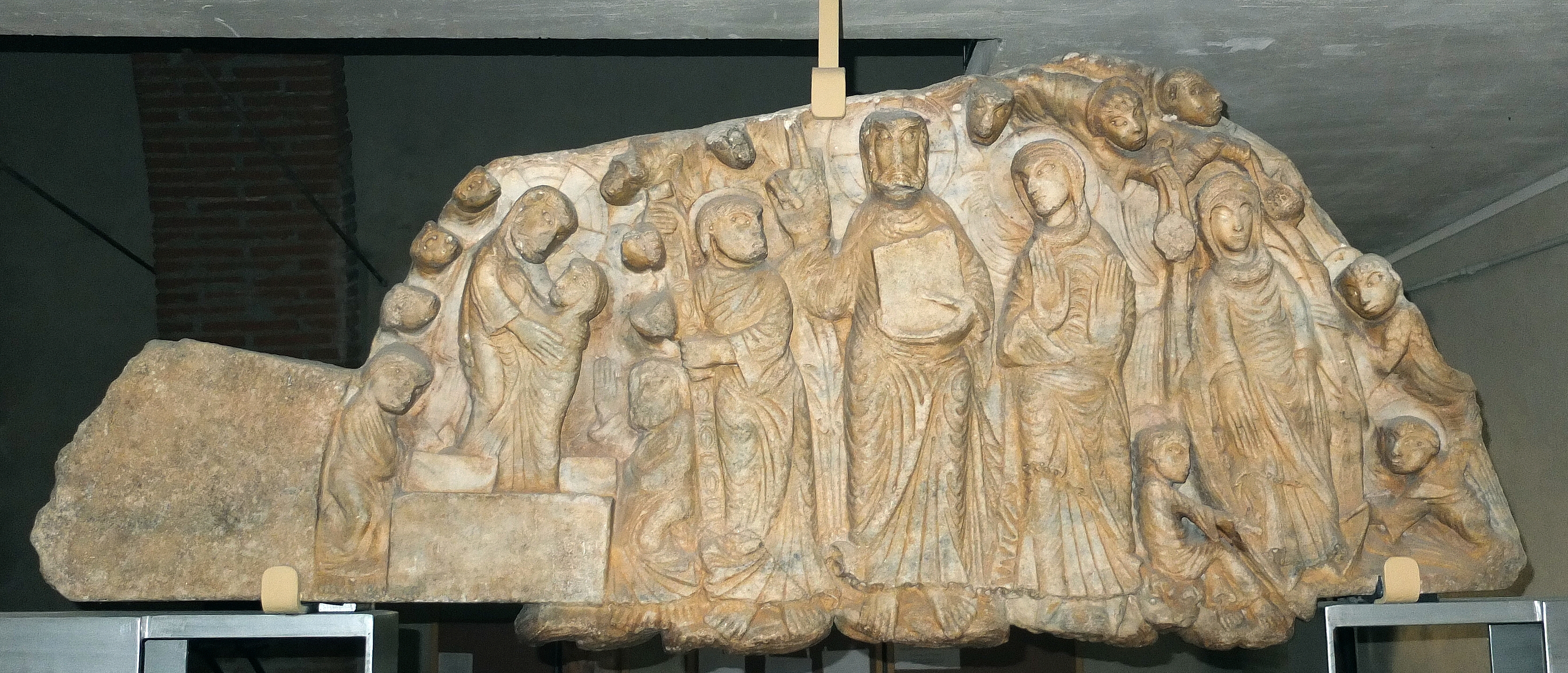
The tympanum of the parish church of Cabestany, from which the Master derived his name, showing his characteristic style

The Master of Cabestany is the name given to an anonymous sculptor active in the second half of the 12th century. He was identified in the 1930s after the discovery of several pieces remarkable for their workmanship and their style; chief among these was the tympanum of the church in Cabestany in the Pyrénées-Orientales department in southern France, from which he received his name. Subsequent research confirmed the presence of his works in the departments of Aude and Pyrénées-Orientales, as well as in northern Catalonia; examples of his art have also been seen in Tuscany and in Navarre.

== Discovery ==
The sculptor's work was first encountered in the 1930s with the discovery of a Romanesque-style tympanum, found during restoration work at the parish church of Cabestany. The high technical quality of the carving, combined with the originality of the theme drew the interest of scholars of medieval art who began to compare the sculpture with other known works. They concluded that the carver was an as-yet unknown figure, dubbed the "Master of Cabestany", who was responsible for sculpting capitals, sarcophagi, and corbels that may still be seen in various religious structures.

In total, 121 sculptures have been attributed to the Master and to his studio. He has also been the subject of numerous studies, in subjects ranging from theology to history and art history.

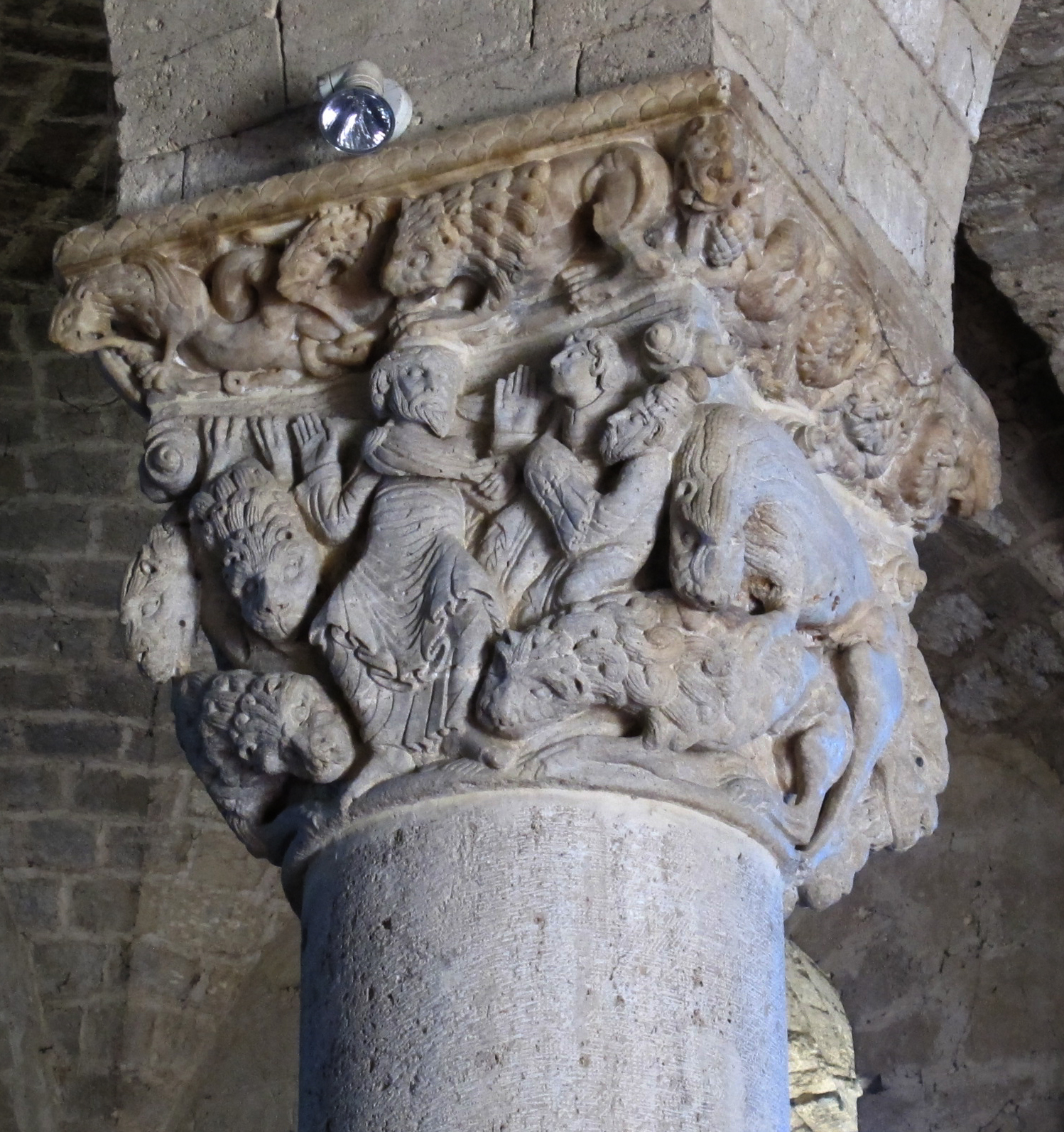
Capital in the Abbey of Sant'Antimo in Tuscany

== Style ==
The Master's sculptures share a peculiar style unlike that of most Romanesque sculptors. All of his human figures have low, triangular faces; crushed chins; high, deeply carved ears; almond-shaped eyes with trepanning holes at either end; hands with long, tapering fingers; many folds in the drapery; and a great deal of detailed work identifying the principal figures.

== Recent developments ==
At the start of the 1990s, the town of Cabestany decided to make as much of the sculptor's work as possible available. Also, in 1993, after consultation with the inspector general of historic monuments, the town created a scientific committee composed of eminent French and European figures to select which of the Master's sculptures they found the most important and most representative. With their advice the town initiated the creation of mouldings taken from various works. As of 2007, over 60 castings had been realized by sculptor Alphonse Snoeck using a method agreed upon by the national director of historic monuments. The castings are made with cast stone which reproduces the same grain and color as may be seen in the originals, making them look identical to the original sculptures.

In 1994 the town acquired an old winemaking cave with over 1,100 metres (3,600 ft) of surface area; this has served as the home for a center devoted to Romanesque sculpture since June 2004. The center serves three purposes, acting as a museum, education center, and a center for research and study. The museum area shows the permanent collection of castings, complementing them with rooms describing local history, art history, and the history of Romanesque sculpture; the last room showcases examples of other carvers contemporaneous with the Master. The sculpture castings are displayed in various ways, either fixed to the wall or freestanding, and are grouped in thematic displays as well. The museum also explains the historic and artistic contexts of the Master and his work.

== Work ==
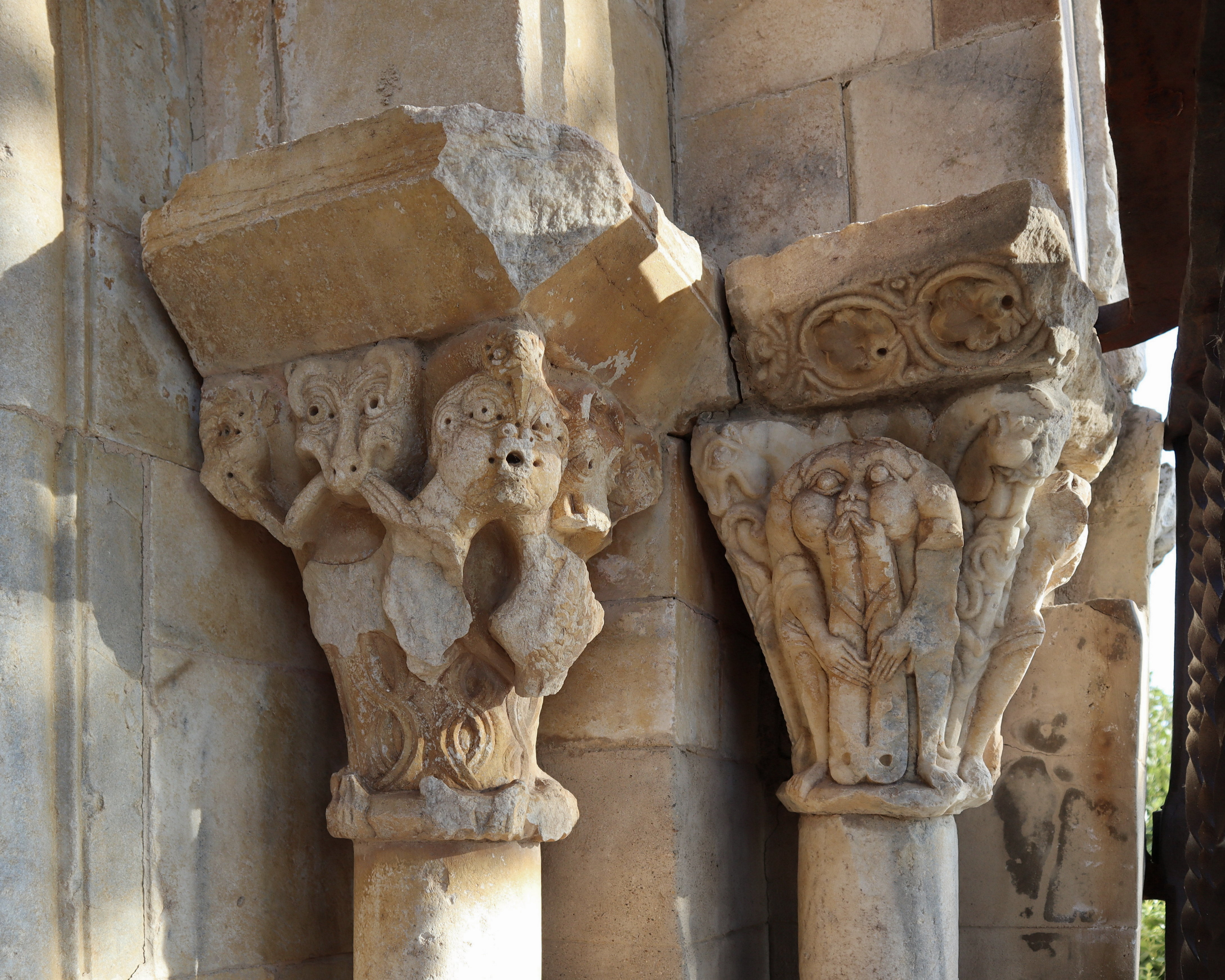
Two capitals in Monastir del Camp

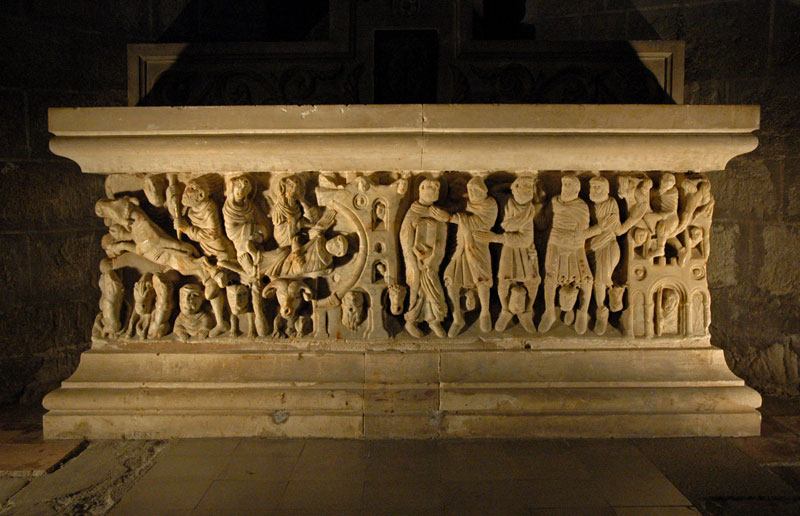
Sarcophagus of Saint Sernin at the Abbey of Saint-Hilaire

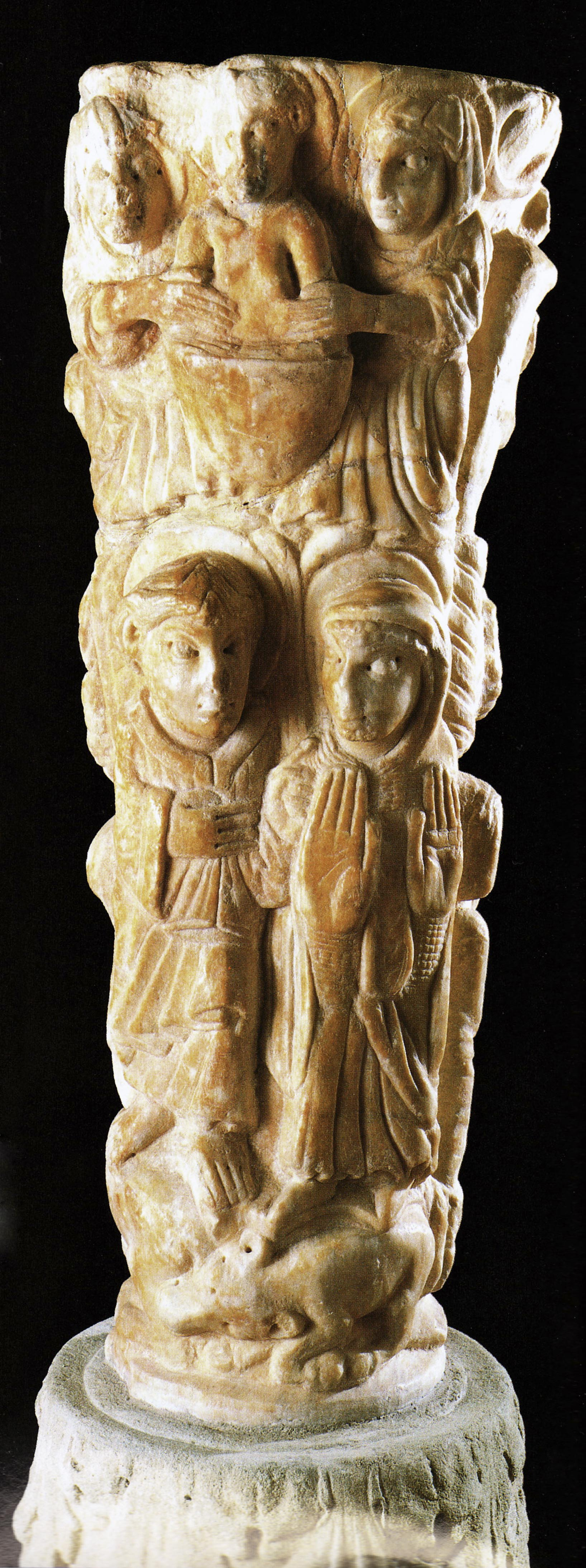
Shaft from the church of San Giovanni In Sugana

The Master's sculptures may be seen in the following locations:

=== Pyrénées-Orientales (French Catalonia) ===
- Cabestany – the tympanum of the parish church of Notre-Dame-des-Anges
- Monastir del Camp – the capitals of the outer door are attributed to his studio
- Le Boulou – the frieze on the outer door of the parish church of Sainte-Marie

=== Catalonia ===
- Sant Pere de Rodes – some fragments of the now-destroyed door of the abbey church
- Girona – some capitals in the abbey church of Sant Pere de Galligants
- Barcelona – Museu Frederic Marès a relief that was taken away from Sant Pere de Rodes.

=== Navarre ===
- Errondo – the tympanum from the church, which may today be found in The Cloisters of the Metropolitan Museum of Art

=== Aude ===
- Rieux-Minervois – the capitals of the church of Saint-Marie; he was also the architect and chief artist of this church
- Abbey of Saint-Hilaire – the reliquary of Saint Saturnin in the abbey church
- Abbey of Saint-Papoul – the sculptures in the apse of the abbey church
- Abbey of Sainte-Marie de Lagrasse – some fragments of the now-destroyed door of the abbey church; some believe these to be products of his studio

=== Tuscany ===
- St. Antimo's Abbey – a capital in the nave of the abbey church depicting Daniel in the lions' den
- San Giovanni in Sugana – a sculpted column held today at the museum of religious art of San Casciano Val di Pesa
- Cathedral museum of Prato – the 12th-century zoomorphic capitals found in the cloister

== Bibliography ==
- COLLECTIF, Le Maître de Cabestany, Ed. Zodiaque, 2000. ISBN 2-7369-0260-2
