= Roussillon =

Coordinates: 42.5°N 2.75°E

Roussillon Rosselló (Catalan)
- Historical province
- Country: France
- Department: Pyrénées-Orientales
- Largest settlement: Perpignan

Area
  - Total: 3,600 km^{2} (1,400 sq mi)

Population
  - Total: 450,000
- Time zone: UTC+1 (CET)
  - Summer (DST): UTC+2 (CEST)

Roussillon coast

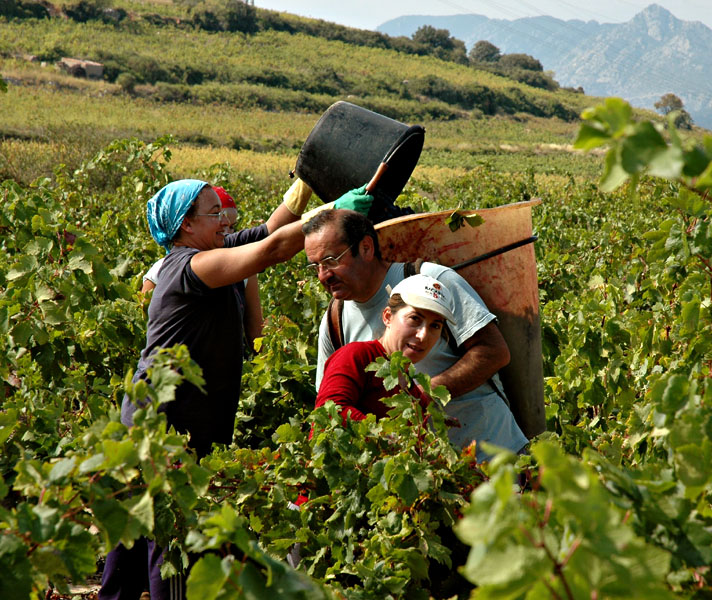
Grape pickers near Maury

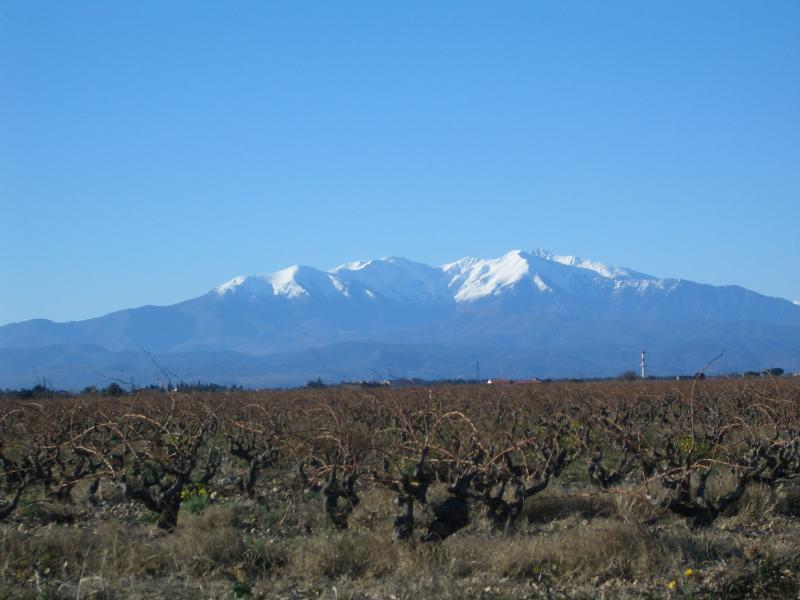
A snow-capped Mount Canigó (2785 m) across the Roussillon plain

Roussillon (UK: /ˈruːsijɒn/ ROO-see-yon, US: /ˌruːsiˈjoʊn/ ROO-see-YOHN, French: [ʁusijɔ̃]; Catalan: Rosselló [rusəˈʎo], locally [rusiˈʎu]; Occitan: Rosselhon [ruseˈʎu]) was a historical province of France that largely corresponded to the County of Roussillon and part of the County of Cerdagne of the former Principality of Catalonia. It is part of the region of Northern Catalonia (Note: Catalan: Catalunya Nord) or French Catalonia (the former used by Catalan-speakers and the latter used by French-speakers), corresponding roughly to the present-day southern French département of Pyrénées-Orientales (with Roussillon, Upper Cerdagne, Capcir, Vallespir, Conflent, and Fenouillèdes) in the former region of Languedoc-Roussillon (today Occitanie).

== History ==
The name Roussillon is derived from Ruscino (Rosceliona, Castel Rossello), a small fortified place near modern-day Perpignan where Gaulish chieftains met to consider Hannibal's request for a conference. The region formed part of the Roman province of Gallia Narbonensis from 121 BC to AD 462, when it was ceded with the rest of Septimania to the Visigoth Theodoric II. His successor, Amalaric, on his defeat by Childebert I in 531, retired to Hispania, leaving a governor in Septimania.

In 719, the Saracens crossed the Pyrenees and maintained political hegemony of Septimania until their final defeat in 759 by Pepin the Short, who went on to occupy Roussillon after conquering Narbonne. Roussillon was occupied by the Carolingians in 760. Upon the invasion of Hispania in 778, Charlemagne found the Marca Hispanica wasted by war and the inhabitants settled in the mountains. He granted some lands in the plains to Visigothic refugees from Moorish Hispania and founded several monasteries. In 792, the Saracens again invaded France, but they were repulsed by Count Guillaume of Toulouse – regent of the child Louis the Pious, King of Aquitaine – whose hegemony extended into Catalonia.

The different portions of his kingdom in time grew into allodial fiefs and, in 893, Sunyer II became the first hereditary count of Roussillon. But his rule only extended over the eastern part of what became the later province. The western part, the Cerdanya (French, Cerdagne), was ruled in 900 by Miró as first count, and one of his grandsons, Bernat, became the first hereditary count of the middle portion, or Besalú. The counts of Roussillon were allied to their cousins the counts of Empúries in a centuries-long conflict with the surrounding great nobles. Count Girard I participated in the First Crusade in the following of Raymond IV of Toulouse, and was one of the first to set foot in Jerusalem when it was stormed by the Crusaders in 1099. At the beginning of the 12th century, the prestige of the Counts of Barcelona began to rise to such a height that the Counts of Roussillon had no choice but to swear fealty to them.

In 1111, Ramon Berenguer III, Count of Barcelona, inherited the fief of Besalú, to which Cerdanya was added in 1117. The possession of Roussillon by its last count, Girard II, was challenged by his illegitimate brothers. To ensure that his brothers would not inherit his territories, in his will Girard II left all his lands to Alfonso II of Aragon, who took possession in 1172. Under the Aragonese monarchs, economic and demographic growth of the region continued, and Collioure (Catalan: Cotlliure), the port of Perpignan, became an important locus of Mediterranean trade.

As the French and Aragonese crowns grew in power, the region of Roussillon, forming part of the border between them, was frequently a site of military conflict. By the Treaty of Corbeil (1258), Louis IX of France formally surrendered his claims of sovereignty over Roussillon and to the title of Count of Barcelona to the Crown of Aragon, recognizing a centuries-old reality.

James I of Aragon had wrested the Balearic Isles from the Moors and joined these islands with Roussillon to create the Kingdom of Majorca, with its capital at Perpignan. In 1276, James I granted this kingdom to his son, who became James II. The subsequent disputes of this monarch with his brother Peter III were exploited by Philip III of France in his quarrel with Peter III for the crown of the Two Sicilies. Philip III espoused James II's cause and led an army into Catalonia but, retreating, died at Perpignan in 1285. Lacking the resources to continue the struggle, James then became reconciled to his brother Peter, and in 1311 the former was succeeded by his son Sanç I, or Sancho I, who founded the cathedral of Perpignan shortly before his death in 1324. His successor, James III of Majorca, refused to do homage to Philip VI of France for the seigneury of Montpellier, and applied to Peter IV of Aragon for aid. Peter not only refused, but declared war and seized Mallorca and Roussillon in 1344.

The province was now reunited to the Principality of Catalonia within the Crown of Aragon, and it enjoyed peace until 1462. In that year, the disputes between John II of Aragon and his son over the Crown of Navarre spurred Louis XI to support John against his subjects, who had risen in revolt, the Catalan Civil War (1462-1472). The province, having been pledged as collateral to Louis for 300,000 crowns, was occupied by French troops until 1493, when Charles VIII evacuated the region as part of a settlement with Ferdinand the Catholic (son of John II of Aragon).

As part of a wider war (the Italian Wars), France and Spain clashed here between 1496 and 1498. Eventually the Spanish, under personal command of Ferdinand, not only secured Roussillon but managed to push into southern France before the new French monarch, Louis XII, signed the Treaty of Granada (1500).

The Habsburg dynasty took control of both the Crown of Castile and the Crown of Aragon in 1516 and the two crowns were for the first time ruled by the same physical person. This was under Charles V, Holy Roman Emperor (called Charles I of Spain), grandson of the Catholic Monarchs.

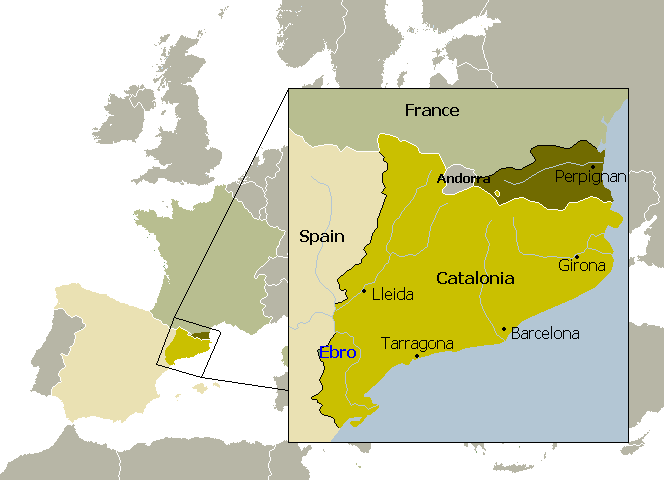
Partition of the Principality of Catalonia (1659)

When Perpignan was besieged by the forces of Henry, Dauphin of France in 1542, the inhabitants were loyal to Charles V. Perpignan earned the royal sobriquet of "Fedelíssima" ("Most Faithful City").

When the Catalans rose against the Spanish Crown in 1640 (the Reapers' War), Louis XIII entered the conflict on the side of the former. After a protracted war, the Treaty of the Pyrenees (1659) partitioned the Principality of Catalonia, securing Roussillon and part of the Cerdanya (Cerdagne) to the French crown, creating the French province of Roussillon.

The next fifty years saw a concerted effort by Louis XIV both to ensure the political allegiance of his new subjects and to alter their cultural identity. He was successful in the former but failed in the latter. Outside the capital of Perpignan, Roussillon remained distinctly Catalan in outlook and culture until the late nineteenth century, when industrialization began to replace Catalan identity with French.

During the French Revolution, the Ancien Régime province of Roussillon was abolished and a new department, the Department of Pyrénées-Orientales, was created instead. This department corresponds roughly to the old Roussillon, with the addition of the comarca of Fenouillèdes. Pyrénées-Orientales is the name by which this department is officially known in France. The old name of Roussillon did contribute to the French région of Languedoc-Roussillon.

== See also ==
- Northern Catalonia
- Roussillon wine
