= Rosselló (comarca) =

Historical Catalan comarca

Coordinates: 42°40′N 2°49′E

Location of Rosselló within the Pyrénées-Orientales department.

Rosselló (Catalan: [rusəˈʎo]) or Roussillon (French: [ʁusijɔ̃]) is a historical and cultural Catalan comarca (county) of Northern Catalonia (France). Its capital and most populated city is Perpignan (Catalan: Perpinyà).

It borders the counties of Alt Empordà (Southern Catalonia) and Vallespir to the south and Conflent to the west, as well as the Occitan region of Languedoc to the north and north-west.

Rosselló has an area of 1,498 km². In 1990, Rosselló had a population of 303,850 inhabitants, with a density of 202.8 people per km².

It comprises part of the historic county and province of Roussillon.

== See also ==
- Counts of Roussillon
