= Northern Catalonia =

Catalan territory ceded to France in 1659

Coordinates: 42°38′N 2°40′E

Northern Catalonia Catalunya Nord (Catalan)
- Cultural region
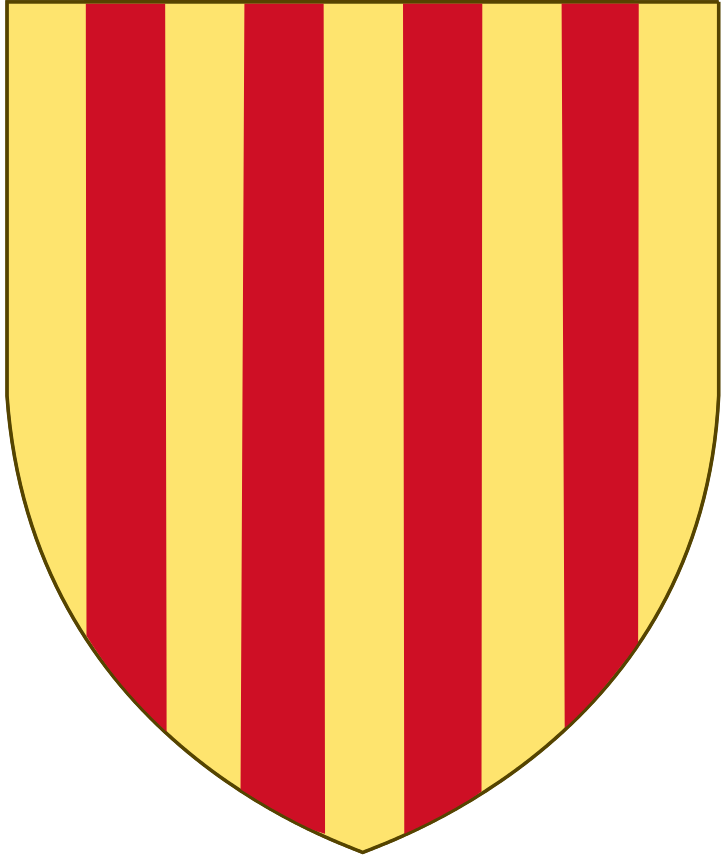
- Flag Coat of arms
- Anthem: Els Segadors (de facto)
- Location of Northern Catalonia (red) in the context of the Catalan Countries

- Northern Catalonia (red) within France
- Country: France
- Region: Occitania
- Department: Pyrénées-Orientales
- Largest settlement: Perpignan

Area
  - Total: 3,677 km^{2} (1,420 sq mi)

Population
  - Total: 475,769
- Time zone: UTC+1 (CET)
  - Summer (DST): UTC+2 (CEST)

Northern Catalonia, North Catalonia (Note: (Catalan: Catalunya (del) Nord [kətəˈluɲə (ðəl) ˈnɔɾt]; French: Catalogne (du) Nord [katalɔɲ (dy) nɔʁ]; Occitan: Catalonha (del) Nòrd; Spanish: Cataluña (del) Norte)) or French Catalonia is the Catalan-speaking and cultural territory ceded to France by Spain through the signing of the Treaty of the Pyrenees in 1659 in exchange for France's effective renunciation to the protection over Catalonia in the context of the Reapers' War (1640–1659). The area corresponds roughly to the modern French département of the Pyrénées-Orientales which was historically part of the Principality of Catalonia since the old County of Barcelona, and remained part of it during the times of the Crown of Aragon and the Habsburg-ruled Monarchy of Spain, until they were separated and given to the Kingdom of France by the Crown of Spain.

The equivalent term in French, Catalogne du Nord, is used nowadays, although less often than the more politically neutral Roussillon (Catalan: Rosselló); Roussillon, though, historically did not include Vallespir, Conflent and Cerdagne (Cerdanya). The term Pays Catalan (País Català), "Catalan Country", is sometimes used.

== Geography ==
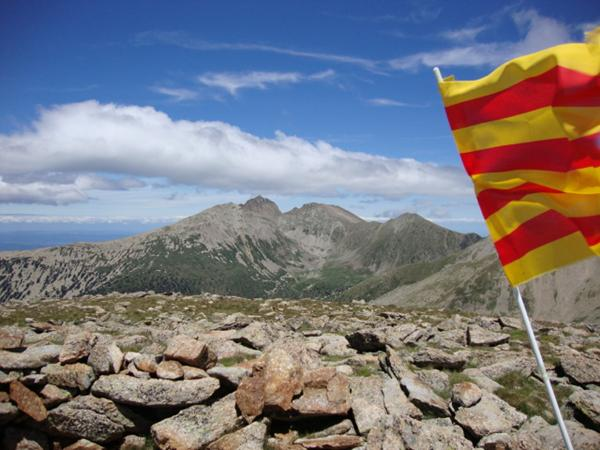
The Canigó peak (2785 m) seen from the nearby Pic dels Set Homes

Northern Catalonia forms a triangle between the Pyrenees to the south, the Corbières Massif to the north-west and the Mediterranean Sea to the east. The Roussillon plain in the east, by far the most populated area, is formed by the flood plains of the rivers Tech, Têt, and Agly (Catalan: Tec, Tet, Aglí). The districts of Vallespir and Conflent cover the upper valleys of the Tech and the Têt respectively. The massif of the Canigou (Catalan: Canigó), 2785 m, dominates much of the territory.

The climate is of the Mediterranean type, with hot, dry summers and winters which are relatively mild, at least on the Roussillon plain where snow is rare.

The city of Perpignan (Catalan: Perpinyà) accounts for over a quarter of the population, over one-third of its urban area is taken into account, and is the only major administrative and service center. Major road and rail links run north–south through Northern Catalonia between France and Spain, while a railway line also links Perpignan to Latour-de-Carol (Catalan: La Tor de Querol) via Prades (Catalan: Prada de Conflent or Prada).

=== Upper Cerdanya ===
Haute-Cerdagne (Catalan: Alta Cerdanya, English: Upper Cerdanya) is geographically distinct from the rest of Northern Catalonia, lying to the south of the Pyrenean watershed in the upper valley of the Segre. It is a mountainous and sparsely populated district, and includes the town of Llívia (pop. 1252 (2005)) which is an exclave of Spain.

The district lies on the most direct route between Toulouse (Occitan: Tolosa de Lengadoc) and Barcelona (via Foix and Ripoll), and a railway line still links the two cities via Latour-de-Carol (Catalan: La Tor de Querol).

== History ==
=== Catalan counties ===
Northern Catalonia formed part of the southern counties of the Frankish Empire (historiographically known as the Marca Hispanica), established by Charlemagne as a buffer territory against Al-Andalus forces. As such, it was divided into feudal counties, Rosselló, Vallespir, Conflent north of the Pyrenees and Cerdanya to the south. By the end of the ninth century, these counties had gained progressively independence from the Carolingian kings and operated as princely states (whose rulers nevertheless retained the title of count).

As the seigneury of the counties became hereditary, the total number of Catalan counts fell steadily. One individual often had the charge of several counties, but these were not always transmitted based on primogeniture. Hence Count Miró II the Young, third son of Wilfred I the Hairy, inherited the counties of Cerdanya and Conflent from his father in 897, and the counties of Besalú and Vallespir from his elder brother Sunyer I when the latter became Count of Barcelona in 911.

The Counts of Rosselló, in alliance with their cousins the Counts of Empuriés, tried to resist this dilution of their power. However, the Counts of Barcelona steadily gained suzerainty over the other Catalan counts, a process that was virtually complete by the twelfth century. The last separate Count of Rosselló, Girard II, left his title to the Crown of Aragon on his death in 1172 to prevent the territory passing to his illegitimate half-brothers. From that point on, the County merged with the other Catalan counties to establish a new state within the Crown, the Principality of Catalonia.

=== Principality of Catalonia ===
Royal administration in the Principality of Catalonia was organized based on territorial divisions known as vegueries, under the charge of a veguer appointed by the King of Aragon as Count of Barcelona. In Northern Catalonia, the vegueries followed closely the boundaries of the old counties. The district of Capcir was a sotsvegueria, based around the castle of Puigbalador (French: Puyvalador) but subordinate to the vegueria of Conflent.

The Treaty of Corbeil (1258) confirmed the frontier between the lands of the Kingdom of France and the Crown of Aragon as the Cerbères, leaving the Occitan district of Fenolheda to France.

On the death of King James I the Conqueror in 1276, Northern Catalonia was combined with the Balearic Isles to form a new Kingdom of Majorca, which passed to James II while the rest of the territory of the Crown of Aragon passed to his brother Peter III. By the Treaty of Perpignan (1279), James II of Mallorca would have to participate in the Catalan Courts; in the counties of Roussillon and Cerdanya the Usages of Barcelona would be in force and Catalan currency would circulate there, therefore ensuring that these counties would continue to be an integral part of the Principality of Catalonia. Furthermore, once peace was made between the brothers, they would sign a pact of mutual defense. This division satisfied neither branch of the family, and the Kingdom of Majorca was retaken militarily by the Crown of Aragon in 1344, fully reintegrating Roussillon and Cerdanya into the Crown of Aragon.

In 1350, University of Perpignan, the second one of Catalonia after Lleida, was founded.

=== Cession to France ===
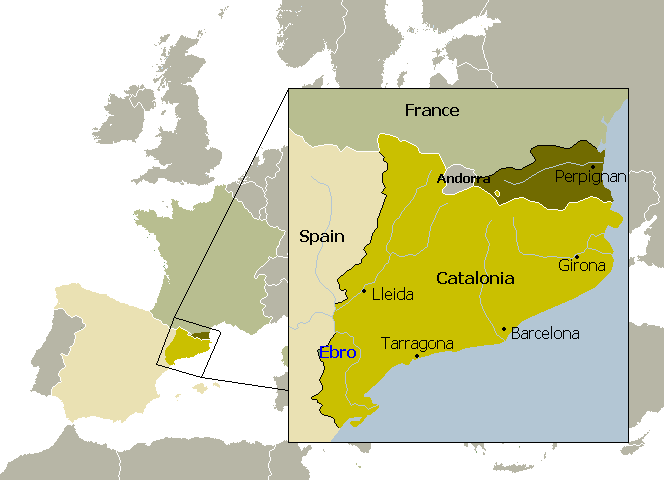
Partition of the Principality of Catalonia between France (dark) and Spain (light), 1659

At the end of the Reapers' War (1640–1659), the Treaty of the Pyrenees of 1659 ceded Northern Catalonia to the Kingdom of France, where it became the province of Roussillon. The French provinces were abolished at the Revolution (Law of 1789-12-22), and Roussillon was joined with the district of Fenouillèdes (Occitan: Fenolheda) to form the département of the Pyrénées-Orientales, with Perpignan (Perpinyà) as its administrative centre.

=== Present day ===
The département of the Pyrénées-Orientales is divided into the arrondissements of Céret (Catalan: Ceret), Perpignan (Perpinyà) and Prades (Prada de Conflent), which are further divided into cantons and communes. Perpignan and sixteen surrounding communes are also associated in the Communauté d'agglomération Têt Méditerranée, created in 2001. Enclaved in the southwest of the département there is the Spanish (Catalonia) exclave of Llívia.

The territory of the Pyrénées-Orientales divided into "comarques" according to Joan Becat (Atles de Catalunya Nord, 1977).

Arrondissement	Cantons	Communes	Population (1999)	Area	Population density (1999)
Céret (Ceret)	5	40	66,624	954 km^{2}	69.8 /km^{2}
Perpignan (Perpinyà)	20	86	287,272	1317 km^{2}	218 /km^{2}
Prades (Prada)	6	100	38,907	1845 km^{2}	21.1 /km^{2}
TOTAL	31	226	392,803	4116 km^{2}	95.4 /km^{2}
All figures include the district of Fenouillèdes.

As is common, the present-day arrondissements do not correspond to pre-Revolutionary boundaries. The arrondissement of Prades (Prada) covers the whole of Haute-Cerdagne (Alta Cerdanya) and Conflent (including Capcir), as well as about a third of Fenolheda (not part of the province of Roussillon). The arrondissement of Céret covers the whole of Vallespir but also the Côte Vermeille (Costa Vermella), which was historically under the control of the counts and veguers of Rosselló at Perpinyà (Perpignan).

Catalan writers sometimes speak of the "comarques of Northern Catalonia". Unlike the autonomous community of Catalonia, these comarques have no administrative significance, although they usually correspond to a certain historical and geographical unity. A commonly used division is that of Joan Becat in his 1977 work Atles de Catalunya Nord, which follows closely the boundaries of the former vegueries except insofar as it promotes the former sotsvegueria of Capcir (177 km^{2}, pop. 1532 (1990)) to a full comarca.

== Politics ==
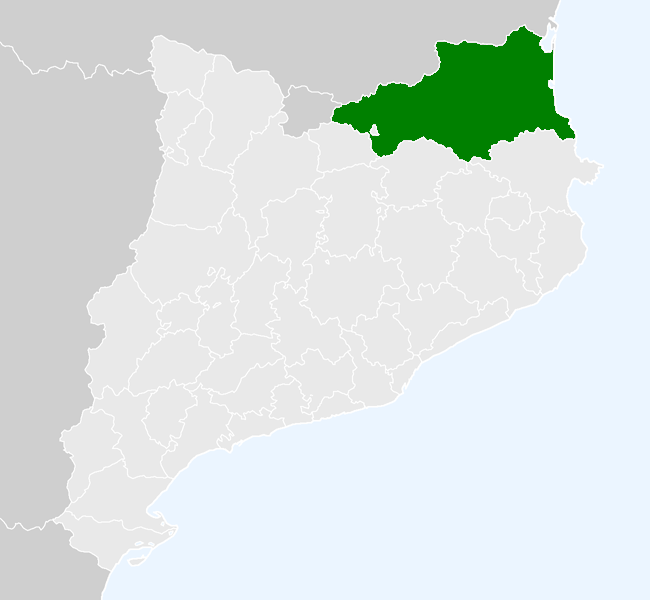
Location of Northern Catalonia (green) with respect to Southern Catalonia (light grey)

The region is divided among those who support the status quo with France and those who support the separation from the region of Occitania with a Corsican-style devolution of administrative autonomy, as well as to promote bonds with Catalonia. There are various organizations and political parties, such as Catalan Unity that promotes the reunification with Catalonia. The party has had some success since 1993, winning seats in municipal elections. It is now the most popular pro-Catalan independence party in the region.

Northern Catalans are generally proud of their Catalan heritage and have developed a "Northern Catalan" identity. However, unlike their Southern neighbors in Spanish Catalonia, the Catalan identity is not a nationalist movement in French Catalonia. According to a 2020 study, French Catalans experienced mass education in the second half of the 19th century, leading them to adopt French patriotism. Catalans in Spain were mass educated in the early 20th century locally by Catalans and not by a strong Spanish state, which led to the consolidation of a salient Catalan national identity.

In 2016, Northern Catalonia was merged with other areas of Occitania to form a new French region. This has led to fears that the Occitan language and culture will be given precedence over the Catalan language and culture.

In December 2017, Express.co.uk reported that 2,000 people took part in a protest in Perpignan, in order to get the French government to hold a referendum on Northern Catalonia reuniting with Southern Catalonia. Northern Catalans helped print ballot slips for the 2017 Catalan independence referendum.

== Language and culture ==
=== Culture ===
The Catalan folk dance Sardana is a dance in the region. Northern Catalans support the USAP rugby union team and the Catalans Dragons rugby league team. There are four castells (Catalan human towers) teams in Northern Catalonia.

=== Language ===
Catalan is spoken in all regions of Northern Catalonia except for Fenolheda which speaks the related (and mutually intelligible) Occitan language.

In Perpignan, where a quarter of the population lives, 44% know the Catalan language. It is estimated that roughly the 34% of the population of Northern Catalonia is able to speak Catalan, and understood by 65%.

==== Recognition ====
Neither Catalan nor any of the other regional languages of France (like Basque, Breton, or Occitan) have official recognition in France. According to the second article of the French Constitution, "the language of the Republic is French", thus being the only official language in France as a whole, and therefore of the Pays Catalan.

Despite lack of support from the French State, Catalan has a degree of acknowledgement by the region of Occitania, which contains Northern Catalonia; this provides some cultural support in education and public media, thanks to some more regional power since the laws of regionalization of France during the 1980s. Bilingual signage exists at the municipal level for traffic.

On 10 December 2007, the General Council of the Pyrénées-Orientales proclaimed Catalan as one of the languages of the department, alongside French and Occitan (in Fenouillèdes), The 'Charter in Support of Catalan' was adopted which called for the inclusion of the Catalan language on signs and its use in material produced by the administrative department.

==== Suppression ====
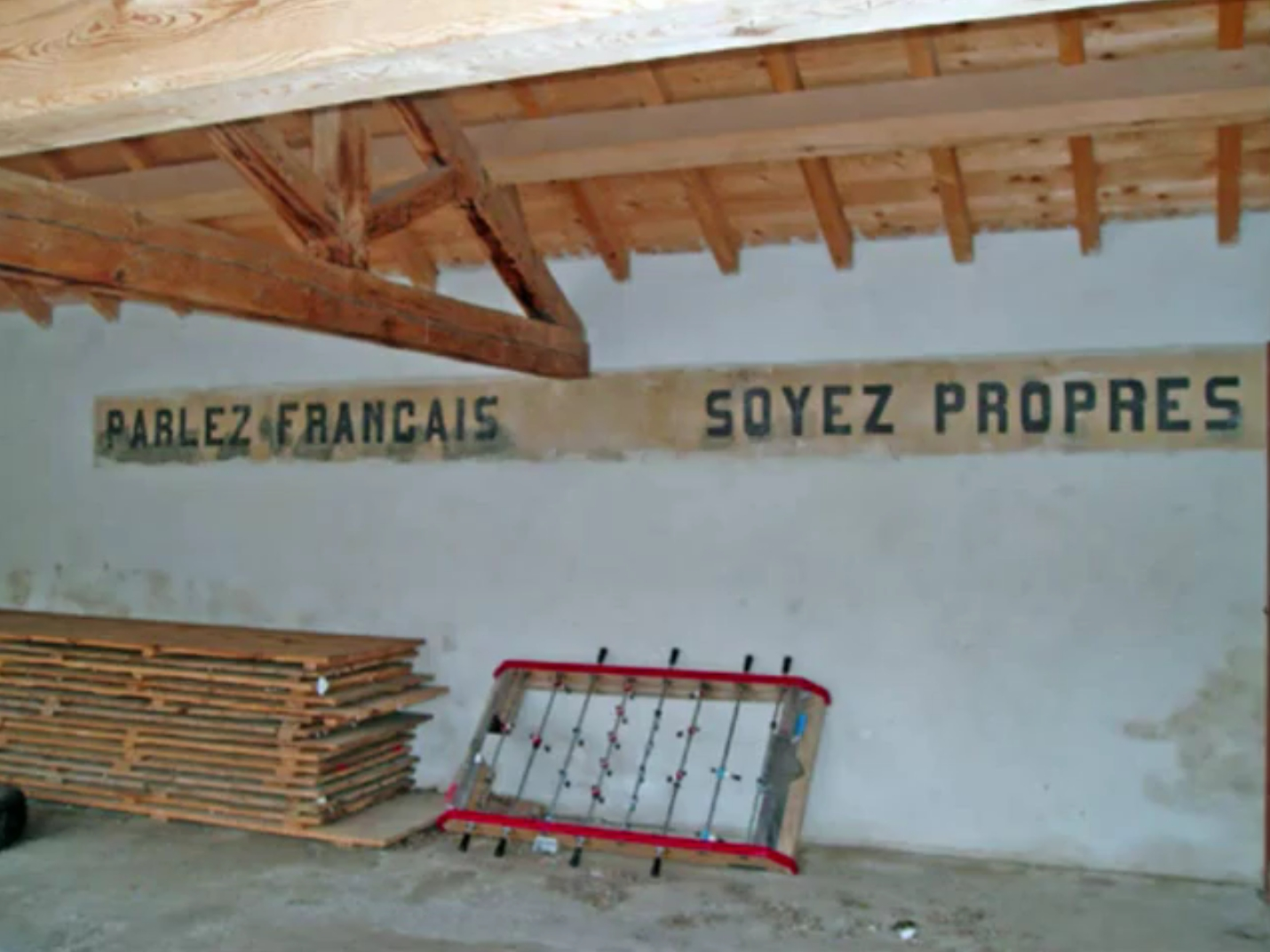
"Speak French, Be Clean" written on the wall of the Aiguatèbia i Talau school

In 1700, the government of Louis XIV prohibited the use of the Catalan language in official documents, although the government only irregularly enforced the edict throughout the eighteenth century.

In Perpignan, Catalan was also prohibited from being used by priests during Mass.

From 1700, all public acts had to be written in French; from 1738, this was extended to include registers of births, marriages and deaths.

In the 1950s, after centuries of being forbidden in education, the Catalan language was permitted to be studied for one hour per week in secondary school. In the 1970s, the Arrels Association and la Bressola network of private schools started to offer complete bilingual French/Catalan classes from nursery up to secondary education.

The use of Catalan in local governments is still severely contested. In 2022, some local councils, such as Elne, passed a modification of their statutes to allow the intervention in Catalan by their members, as long as they provide an exact oral and written translation in French. Despite being a symbolic gesture, the prefect of the Department, arguing that the political rights of French speakers will be violated, appealed to justice to repeal these initiatives. In April 2023, the Administrative Court of Montpellier sided with the Prefect, thus declaring illegal the decisions of the local councils.

=== Leisure ===
North Catalonia is one of just two regions in France where Spanish-suited playing cards are used. (Note: The other being the region of Vendée and Brittany where Aluette cards are used to play the eponymous game.) The region has its own French Catalan pattern cards which are used to play local games like a variant of Spanish Truc.

== See also ==
- Albera Massif
- Language policy in France
- Sport in Catalonia
- County of Roussillon
- Principality of Catalonia
- Northern Basque Country
