= Conflent =

Historical region in Catalonia

Coordinates: 42°36′N 2°23′E

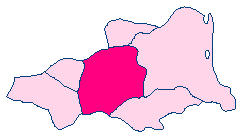

Conflent (French pronunciation: [kɔ̃flɑ̃]; Catalan pronunciation: [kumˈflen]) is a historical Catalan comarca of Northern Catalonia, now part of the French department of Pyrénées-Orientales. In the Middle Ages it comprised the County of Conflent.

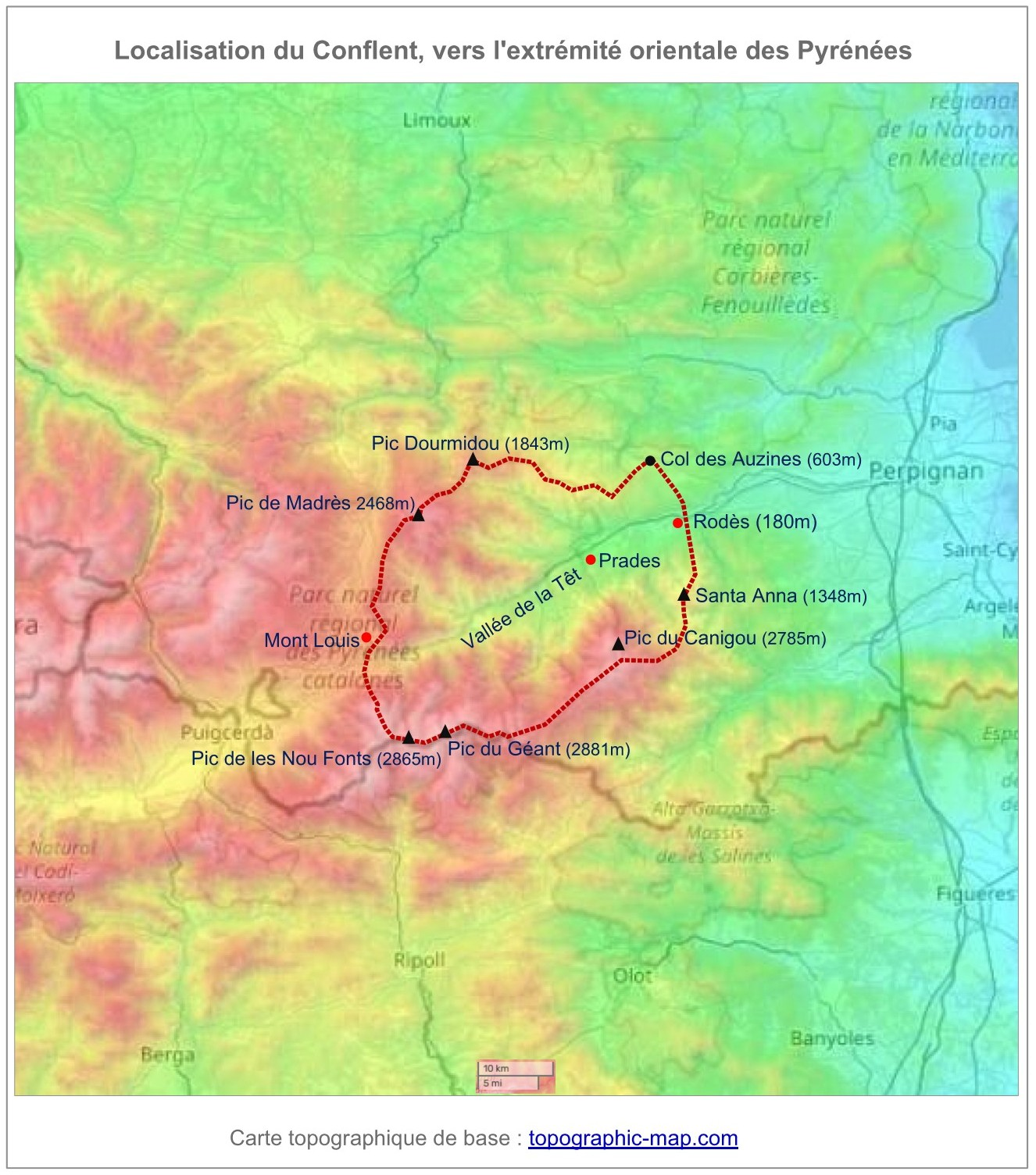
The location of Conflent.

The capital of this pays is Prades (Catalan: Prada de Conflent), and it borders the pays of Capcir, Rosselló, Vallespir, Alta Cerdanya and Ripollès, and the Occitan-speaking pays of Fenolleda. It roughly corresponds to the Têt River (Catalan: Tet) and its neighbourhoods between Rodès and Mont-Louis (Catalan: Montlluís). Conflent is dominated by the Canigou (Catalan: Canigó) mountain.

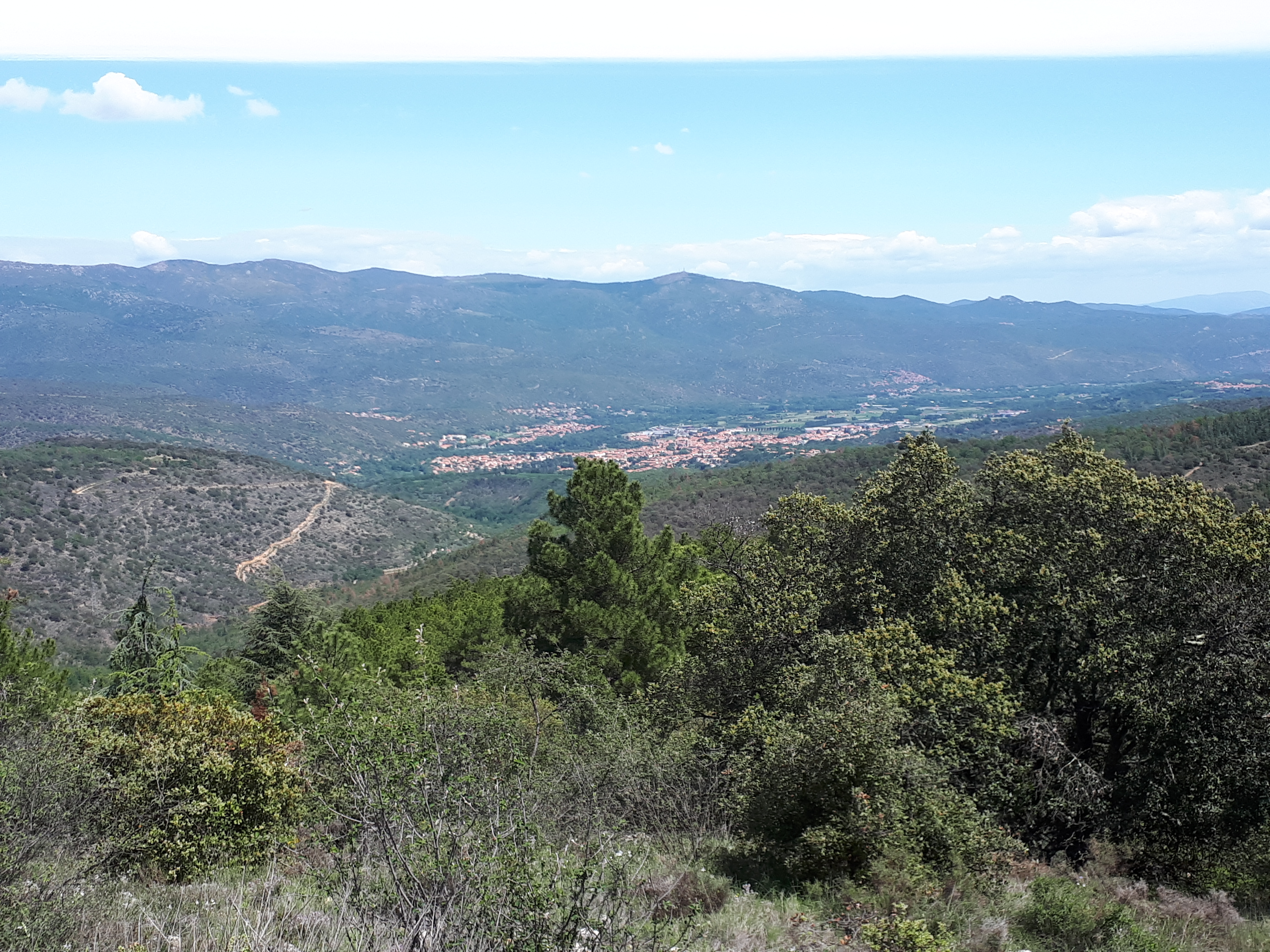
The town of Prades, in the Têt valley, seen from the south-west.

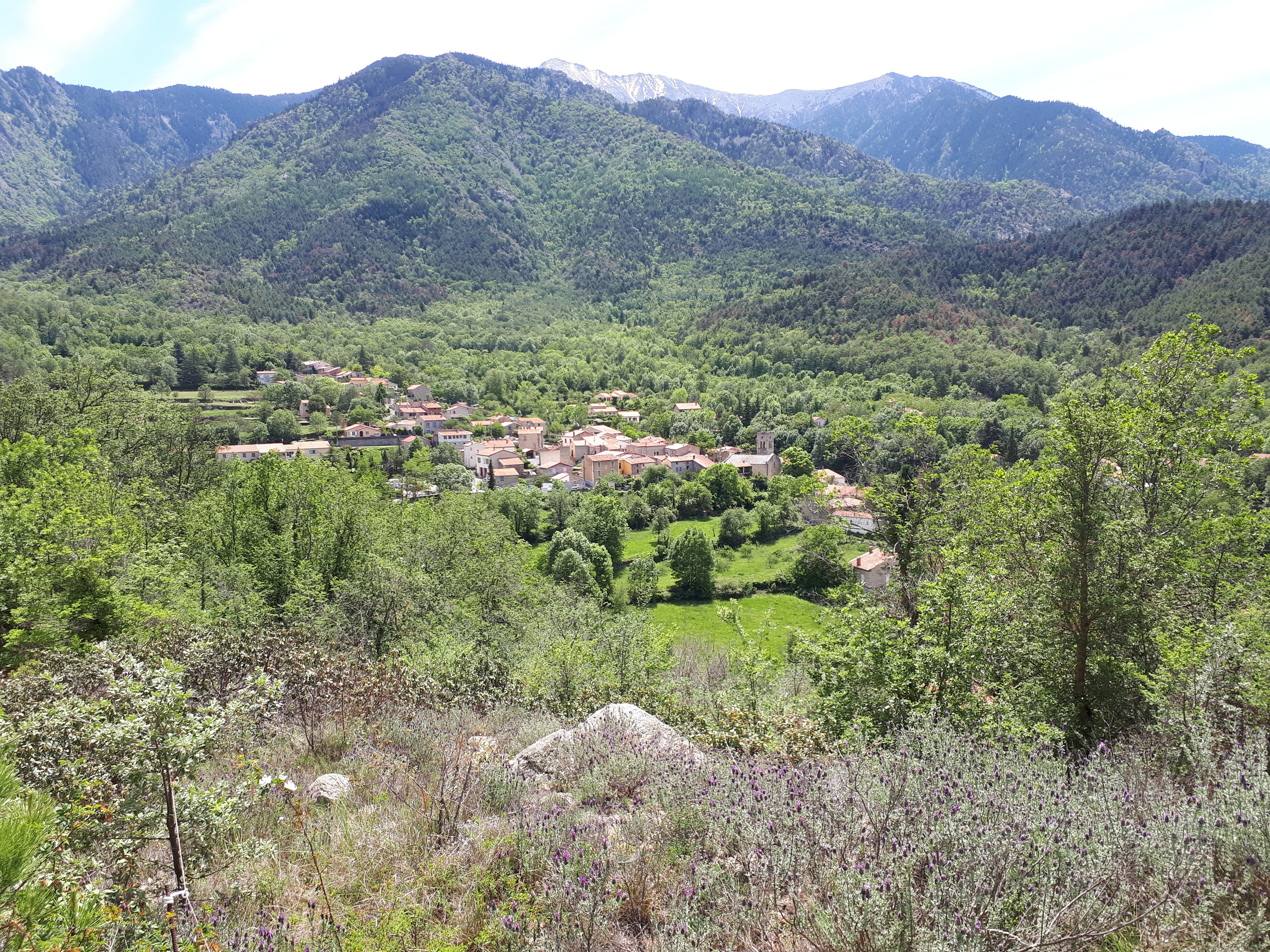
The village of Fillols (Conflent), lying at the foot of Canigou mountain.

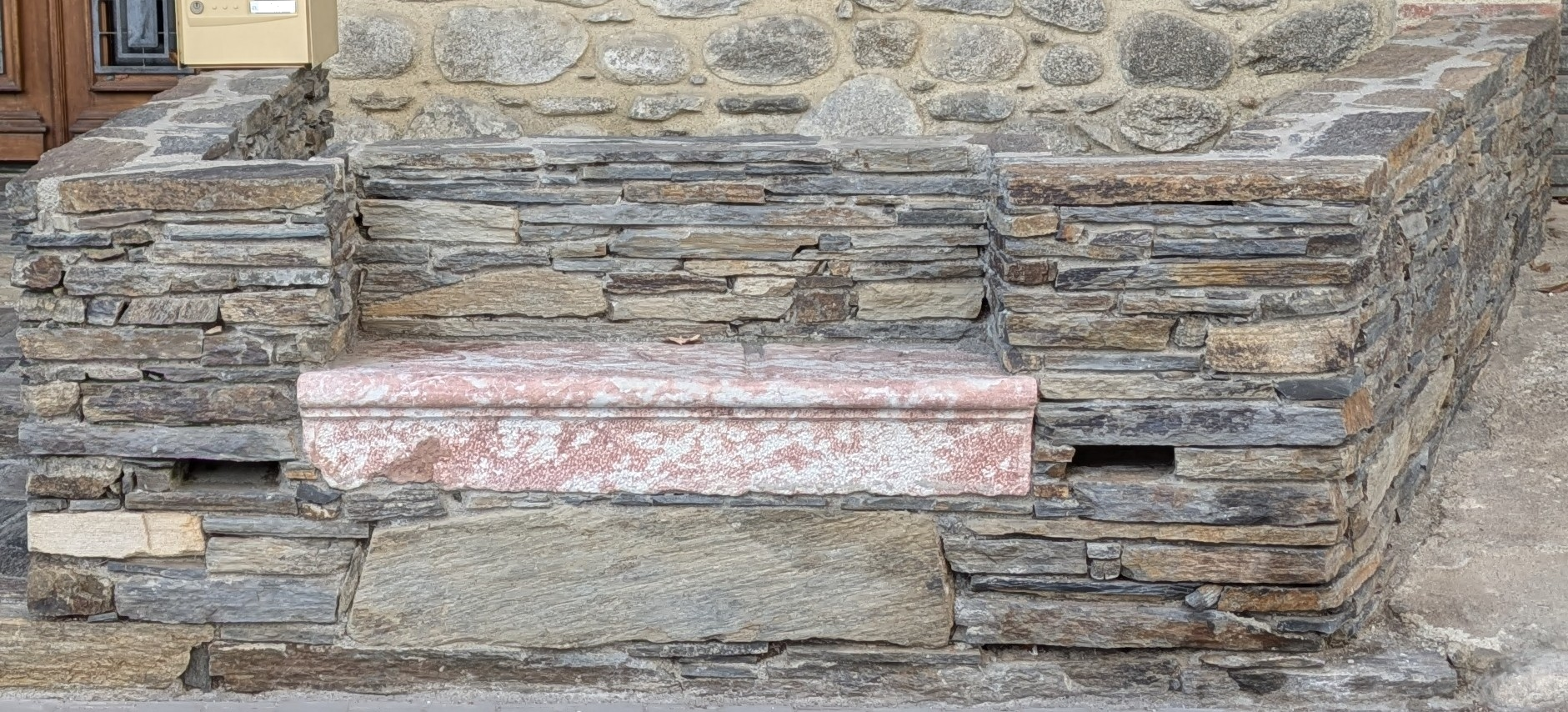
Marble, schist and granite are among the predominant formations in the surface geology of Conflent. Near the centre of Prades, there is this elegant wall built with stones from these formations.

== See also ==
- Treaty of the Pyrenees
- Yellow Train
