= Fenouillèdes =

French comarca

Coordinates: 42.81°N 2.49°E

Fenouillèdes in Pyrénées-Orientales

Fenouillèdes (French pronunciation: [fənujɛd]; Occitan: Fenolhedés/Fenolheda; Catalan: Fenolledès/Fenolleda) is a French comarca and a traditional Occitan-speaking area in the département of Pyrénées-Orientales. The capital of the comarca is Saint-Paul-de-Fenouillet (Sant Pau de Fenolhet).

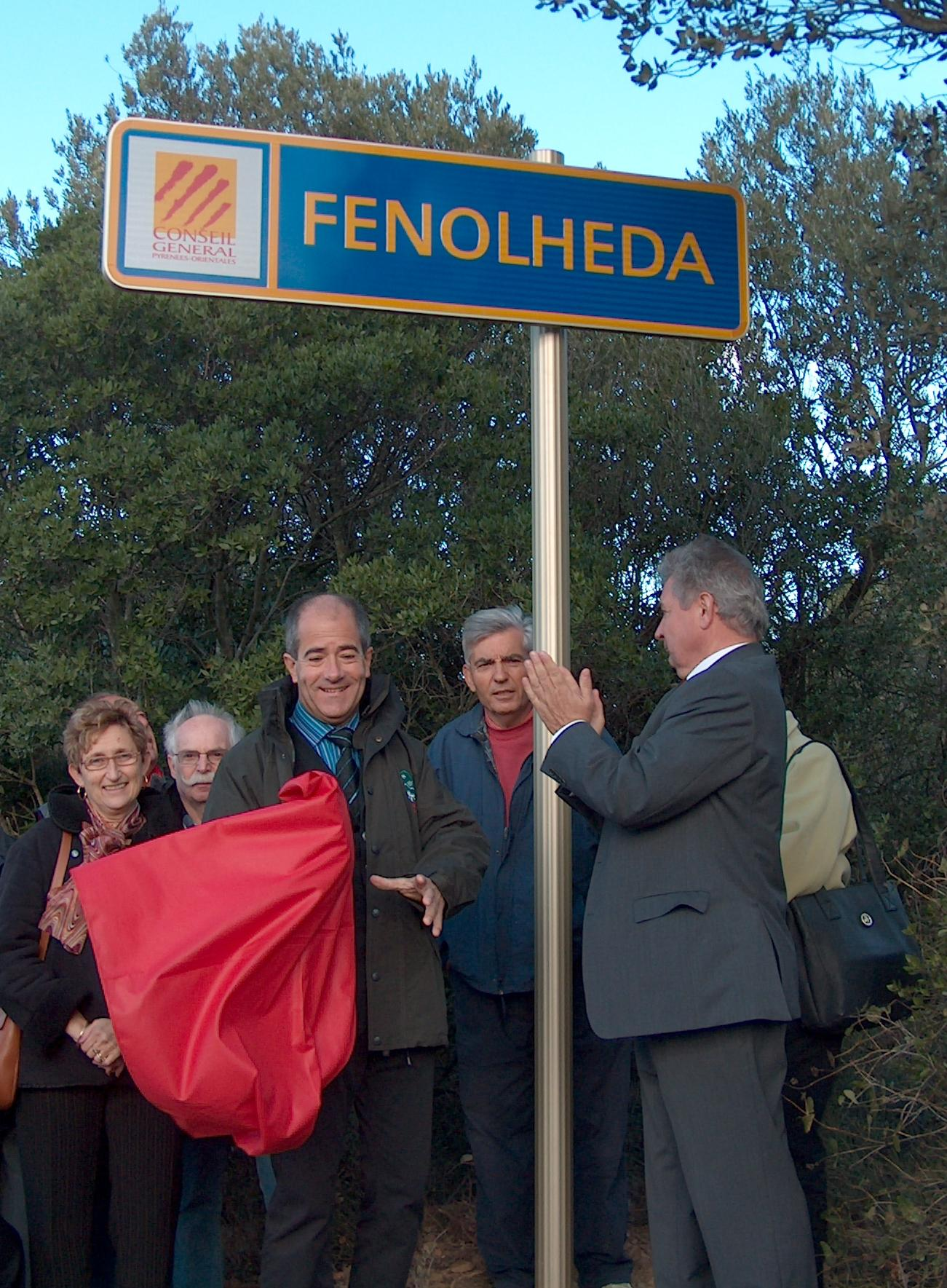
Fenolheda road sign, introduced by Christian Bourquin

Fenouillèdes has been part of France since the Treaty of Corbeil of 1258. In 1790, during the French Revolution, it was incorporated in a newly created département along with the Roussillon comarques.

== See also ==
- Corbières Massif
