= Vallespir =

Historical district in French Catalonia

Coordinates: 42°27′N 2°39′E

Vallespir (French pronunciation: [valɛspiʁ]; Catalan pronunciation: [bəʎəsˈpi]) is a historical Catalan comarca in Northern Catalonia, part of the French department of Pyrénées-Orientales.

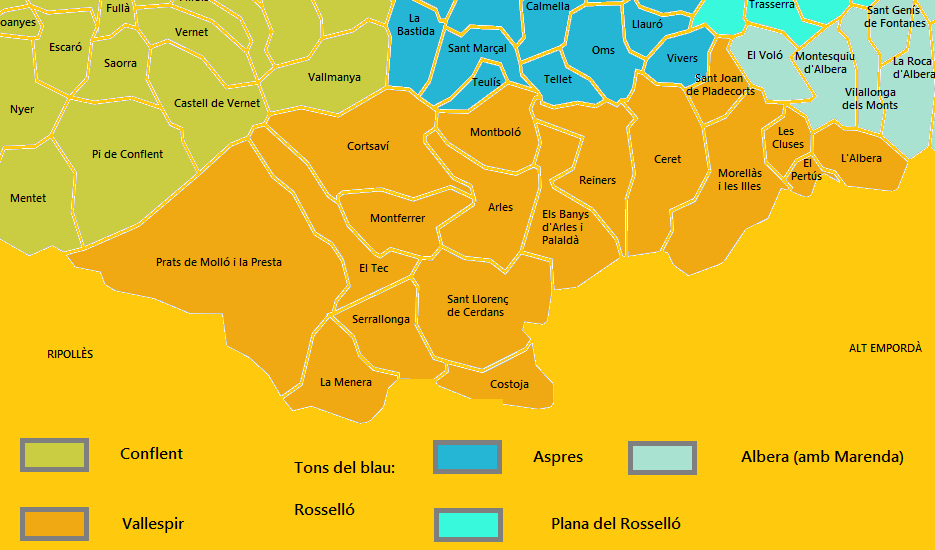
Vallespir

== Geography ==
The capital of the comarca is Ceret, and it borders the comarques of Conflent, Rosselló, Alt Empordà, Garrotxa and Ripollès. It lies in the Tech River valley, which crosses it from west to east.

The northern half of the comarca is dominated by the Pla Guillem and the mountain of Canigó, and to the south are the mountains of Puig de Comanegra and Roc de la Fraussa.

Ceret, the capital, contains about a third of the comarca's polulation. Other notable towns include Amélie-les-Bains-Palalda, Arles, and Prats-de-Mollo-la-Preste.

== Name ==
The name Vallespir first appears in writing in 814 under the form Vallis Asperi, and from the 9th to the 11th centuries, the names Valle Asperi or Valle Asperii were common.

By the 18th century, the form Vall de Spir appears to be the most common, seen in documents from 1706 and 1813. In the 19th century, other references call it Val Spir or Val Spire.
