= Capcir =

Historical comarca in Northern Catalonia

Coordinates: 42°37′0″N 2°07′0″E

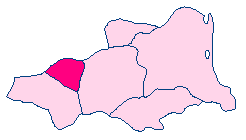

Capcir (Catalan: [kəpˈsi]; French: [kapsiʁ]) is a historical Catalan comarca of Northern Catalonia, now part of the French department of Pyrénées-Orientales. The capital of the comarca was Formiguera, and it borders the historical comarques of Conflent and Alta Cerdanya. Capcir is on a plateau, averaging 1500 metres above sea level, and allows passage between the high valleys of Aude and both the Spanish Cerdanya and French Cerdagne. It has traditionally been rural, but has developed considerably in last the forty years thanks to its tourist attractions. Capcir has two nicknames: little Siberia or little Canada. This gives an idea of the climate which can prevail during the winter. It is one of the last places in Western Europe where the arctic plant Ligularia sibirica can be found.

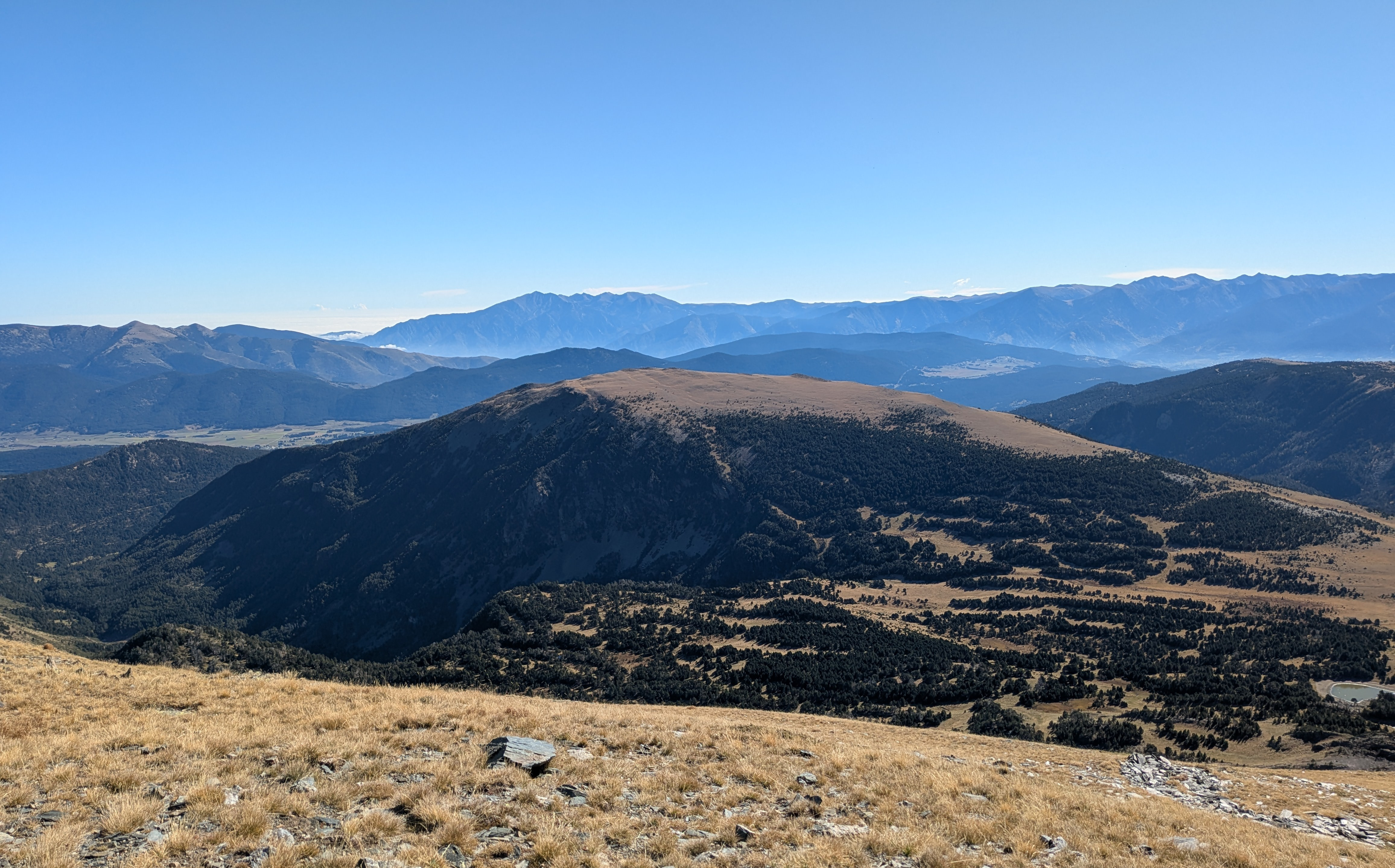
Puig del Pam, altitude 2470 metres, Capcir.

== See also ==
- Treaty of the Pyrenees
