= Arrondissement of Perpignan =

Coordinates: 42°41′37″N 2°53′28″E

Perpignan
- Arrondissement
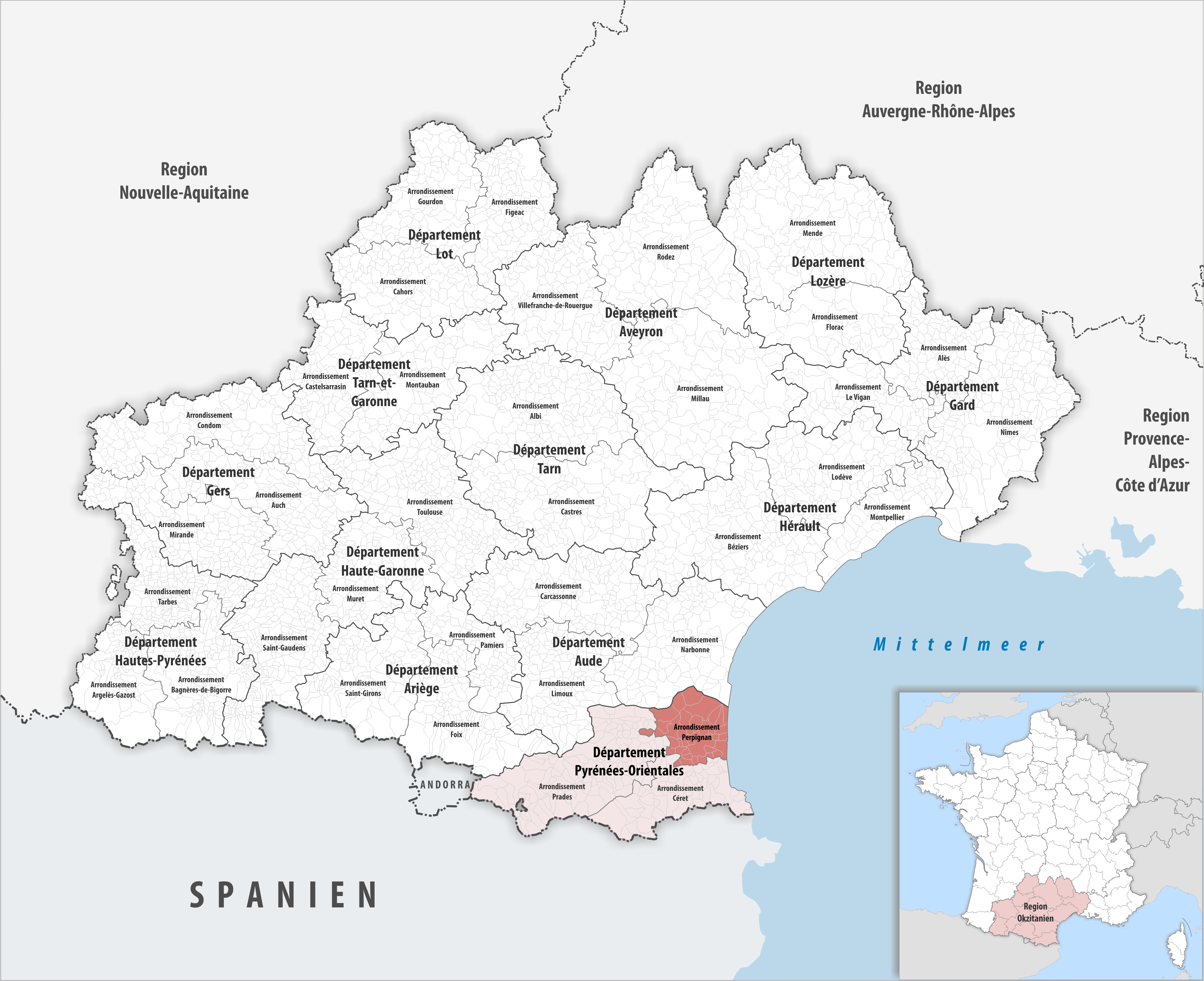
- Location within the region Occitanie
- Country: France
- Region: Occitania
- Department: Pyrénées-Orientales
- No. of communes: {{{nbcomm}}}
- Area: 720.5 km^{2} (278.2 sq mi)
- Population (2023): 300,117
  - Density: 416.5/km^{2} (1,079/sq mi)
- INSEE code: 662

The arrondissement of Perpignan is an arrondissement of France in the Pyrénées-Orientales department (Northern Catalonia) in the Occitanie region. It has 39 communes. Its population is 292,142 (2021), and its area is 720.5 km^{2} (278.2 sq mi).

== Composition ==
The communes of the arrondissement of Perpignan, and their INSEE codes, are:

1. Baho (66012)
2. Baixas (66014)
3. Le Barcarès (66017)
4. Bompas (66021)
5. Cabestany (66028)
6. Calce (66030)
7. Canet-en-Roussillon (66037)
8. Canohès (66038)
9. Cases-de-Pène (66041)
10. Cassagnes (66042)
11. Claira (66050)
12. Espira-de-l'Agly (66069)
13. Estagel (66071)
14. Llupia (66101)
15. Montner (66118)
16. Opoul-Périllos (66127)
17. Perpignan (66136)
18. Peyrestortes (66138)
19. Pézilla-la-Rivière (66140)
20. Pia (66141)
21. Pollestres (66144)
22. Ponteilla (66145)
23. Rivesaltes (66164)
24. Sainte-Marie-la-Mer (66182)
25. Saint-Estève (66172)
26. Saint-Féliu-d'Avall (66174)
27. Saint-Hippolyte (66176)
28. Saint-Laurent-de-la-Salanque (66180)
29. Saint-Nazaire (66186)
30. Saleilles (66189)
31. Salses-le-Château (66190)
32. Le Soler (66195)
33. Tautavel (66205)
34. Torreilles (66212)
35. Toulouges (66213)
36. Villelongue-de-la-Salanque (66224)
37. Villeneuve-de-la-Raho (66227)
38. Villeneuve-la-Rivière (66228)
39. Vingrau (66231)

== History ==
The arrondissement of Perpignan was created in 1800. In January 2017 it lost 24 communes to the arrondissement of Céret and 23 communes to the arrondissement of Prades.

As a result of the reorganisation of the cantons of France which came into effect in 2015, the borders of the cantons are no longer related to the borders of the arrondissements. The cantons of the arrondissement of Perpignan were, as of January 2015:

1. Canet-en-Roussillon
2. La Côte Radieuse
3. Elne
4. Latour-de-France
5. Millas
6. Perpignan-1
7. Perpignan-2
8. Perpignan-3
9. Perpignan-4
10. Perpignan-5
11. Perpignan-6
12. Perpignan-7
13. Perpignan-8
14. Perpignan-9
15. Rivesaltes
16. Saint-Estève
17. Saint-Laurent-de-la-Salanque
18. Saint-Paul-de-Fenouillet
19. Thuir
20. Toulouges
