= Cantons of the Pyrénées-Orientales department =

Overview and list of cantons

The following is a list of the 17 cantons of the Pyrénées-Orientales department, in France, following the French canton reorganisation which came into effect in March 2015:

1. Les Aspres
2. Le Canigou
3. La Côte Sableuse
4. La Côte Salanquaise
5. La Côte Vermeille
6. Perpignan-1
7. Perpignan-2
8. Perpignan-3
9. Perpignan-4
10. Perpignan-5
11. Perpignan-6
12. La Plaine d'Illibéris
13. Les Pyrénées catalanes
14. Le Ribéral
15. La Vallée de l'Agly
16. La Vallée de la Têt
17. Vallespir-Albères
