= Canton of Toulouges =

Coordinates: 42°40′18″N 2°49′58″E

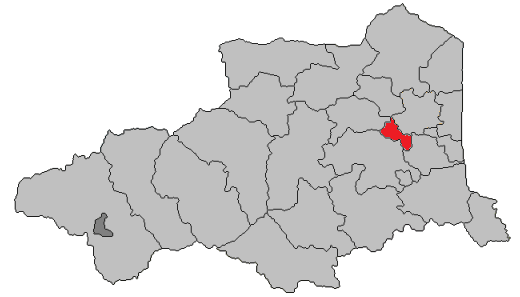
Location of the canton in Pyrénées-Orientales

The Canton of Toulouges is a French former canton of Pyrénées-Orientales department, in Languedoc-Roussillon. It had 15,863 inhabitants (2012). It was disbanded following the French canton reorganisation which came into effect in March 2015.

== Composition ==
The canton of Toulouges comprised 3 communes:

- Toulouges
- Canohès
- Pollestres
