= Georget =

Georget is a surname. Notable people with the surname include:

- Émile Georget (1881–1960), French road racing cyclist, brother of Léon
- Étienne-Jean Georget (1795–1828), French psychiatrist
- Léon Georget (1879–1949), French road racing cyclist, brother of Émile
- Philippe Georget (b. 1962), French author of crime novels
