= Perpignan 9th Canton =

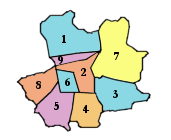
Cantons of Perpignan

The Perpignan 9th Canton is a French former canton of Pyrénées-Orientales department, in Languedoc-Roussillon. It was created 25 January 1982 by the decree 82–84. It had 14,815 inhabitants (2012). It was disbanded following the French canton reorganisation which came into effect in March 2015.

== Composition ==
The Perpignan 9th Canton comprised part of the commune of Perpignan. It included the following neighbourhoods:

- Mas Donat
- Bas-Vernet
- Clodion-Torcatis
- Roudayre
