= Canton of Perpignan-7 =

Coordinates: 42.7142°N 2.9162°E

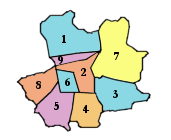
Cantons of Perpignan

The Canton of Perpignan-7 is a French former canton of Pyrénées-Orientales department, in Languedoc-Roussillon. It was created 16 August 1973 by the decree 73-819. It had 20,211 inhabitants (2012). It was disbanded following the French canton reorganisation which came into effect in March 2015.

== Composition ==
The canton comprised the following communes:

- Bompas
- Perpignan (partly)

The canton included the following neighbourhoods of Perpignan:

- Les Platanes
- Les Coves
- Clos-Banet
- Mas Vermeil
- Route de Canet
- Massilia
- Mas Llaró
- Château-Roussillon
