= Rasiguères =

Rasiguères Rasiguèras
- Commune
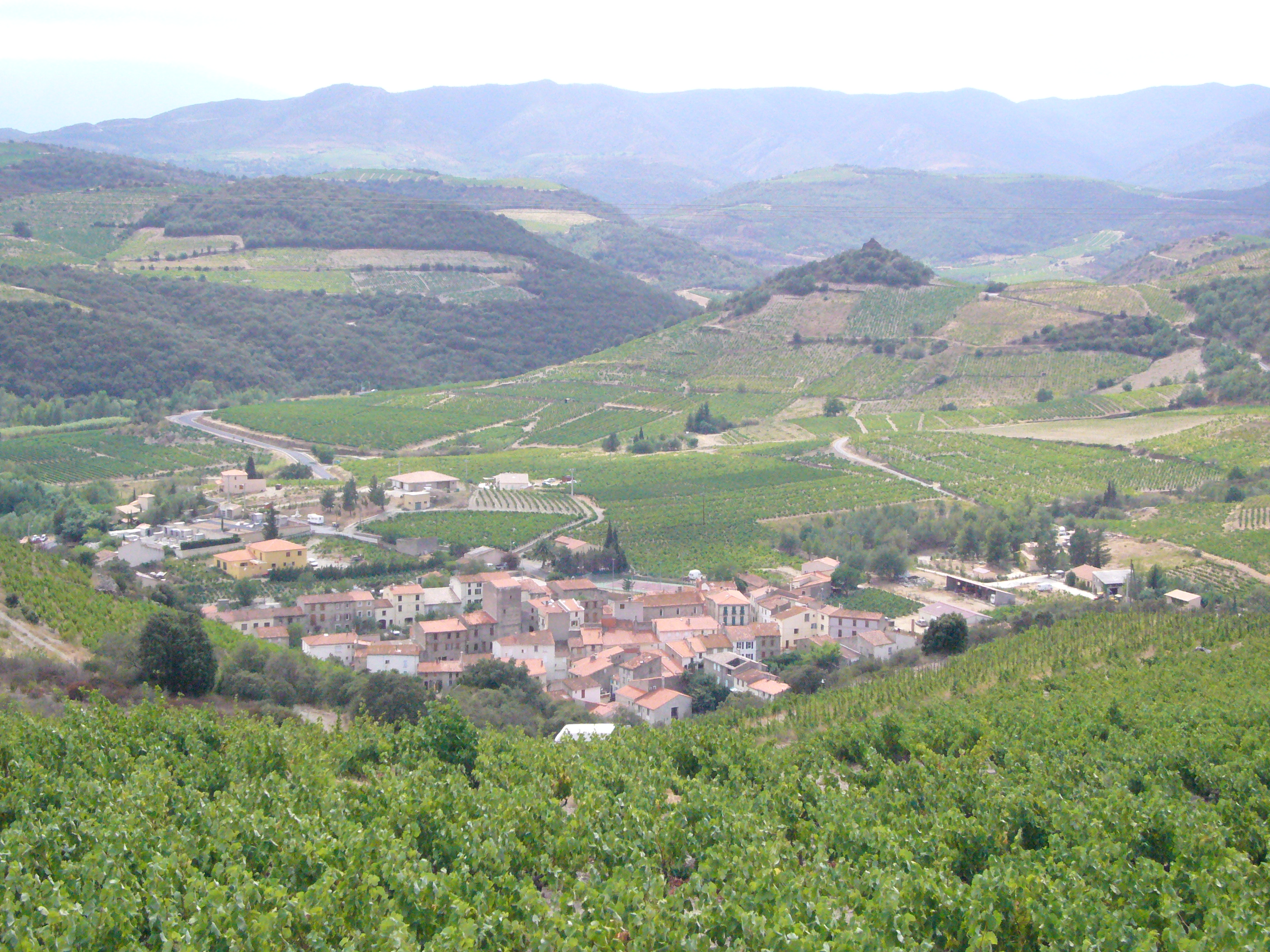
- A general view of Rasiguères (view to the south-west)

- Coat of arms
- Location of Rasiguères
- Location within France Location within Occitanie
- Coordinates: 42°46′00″N 2°36′34″E
- Country: France
- Region: Occitania
- Department: Pyrénées-Orientales
- Arrondissement: Prades
- Canton: La Vallée de l'Agly
- Intercommunality: Agly Fenouillèdes

Government
  - Mayor (2020–2026): Paul Foussat
- Area^{1}: 13.72 km^{2} (5.30 sq mi)
- Elevation: 182 m (597 ft)
- Highest elevation: 548 m (1,798 ft)
- Lowest elevation: 104 m (341 ft)
- Population (2023): 165
  - Density: 12.0/km^{2} (31.1/sq mi)
- Time zone: UTC+01:00 (CET)
  - Summer (DST): UTC+02:00 (CEST)
- INSEE/Postal code: 66158 /66720
- ^{1} French Land Register data, which excludes lakes, ponds, glaciers > 1 km^{2} (0.386 sq mi or 247 acres) and river estuaries.

Rasiguères (French pronunciation: [ʁaziɡɛʁ]; Occitan: Rasiguèras; Catalan: Rasigueres) is a commune in the Pyrénées-Orientales department in southern France.

== Geography ==
=== Localisation ===
Rasiguères is in the canton of La Vallée de l'Agly and in the arrondissement of Perpignan. It gained particular recognition in 1981 when the pianist Dame Moura Lympany, who lived in the village, established the Festival of Music and Wine which ran successfully for several years.

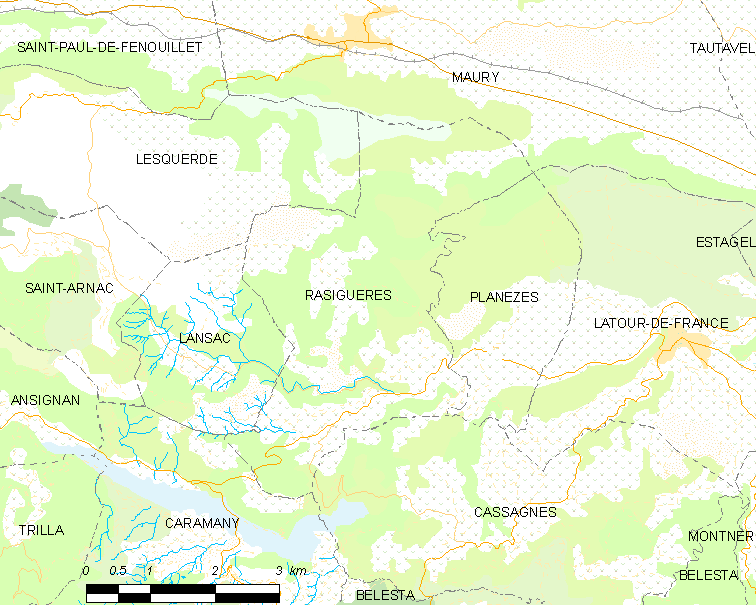
Map of Rasiguères and its surrounding communes

== Population ==
Historical population
Year	Pop.	±% p.a.
1968	228	—
1975	152	−5.63%
1982	162	+0.91%
1990	165	+0.23%
1999	168	+0.20%
2007	139	−2.34%
2012	167	+3.74%
2017	152	−1.86%
2023	165	+1.38%
Source: INSEE

== Sites of interest ==
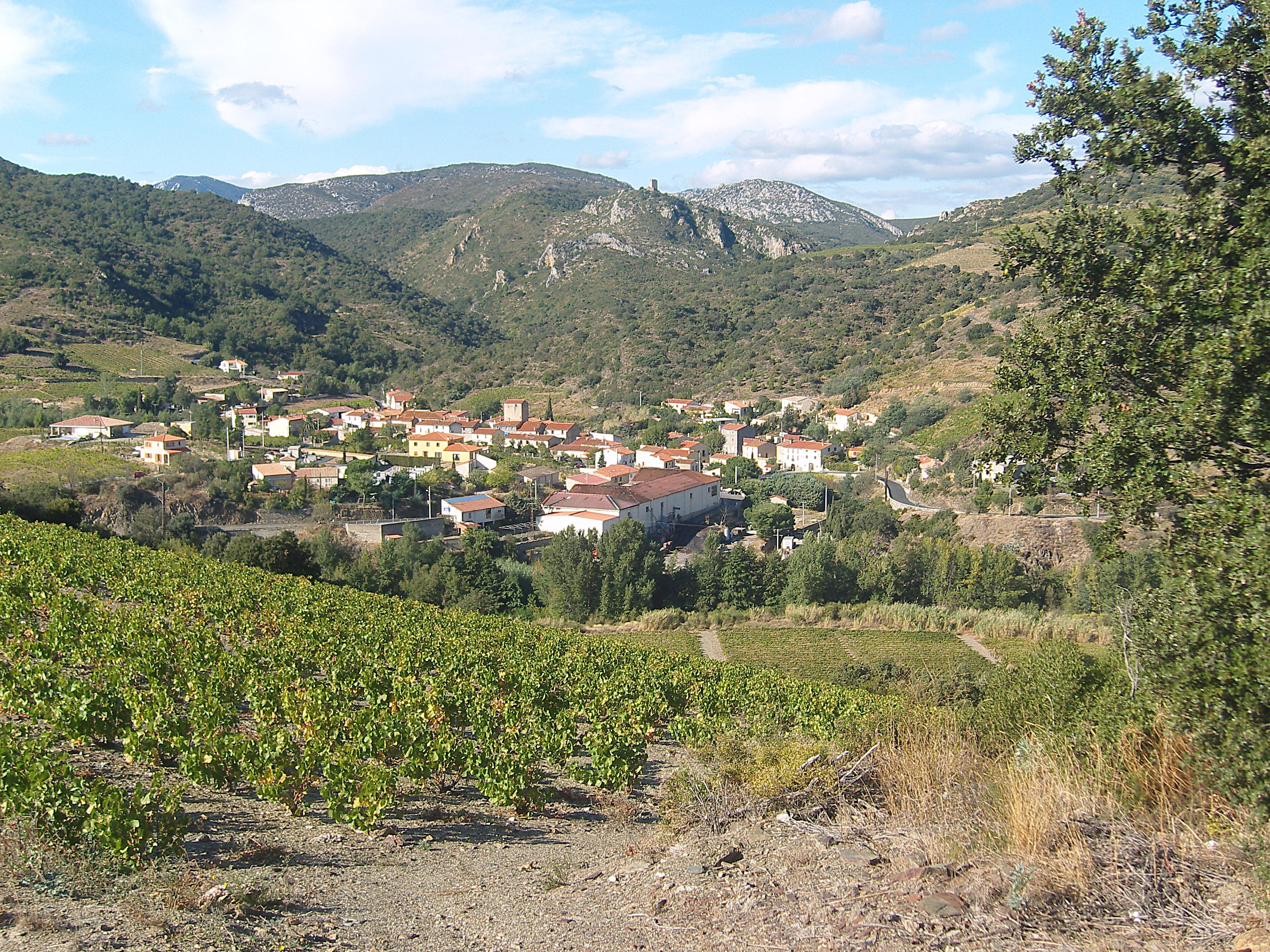
The village of Rasiguères and the medieval Tour de Trémoine (view to the north)

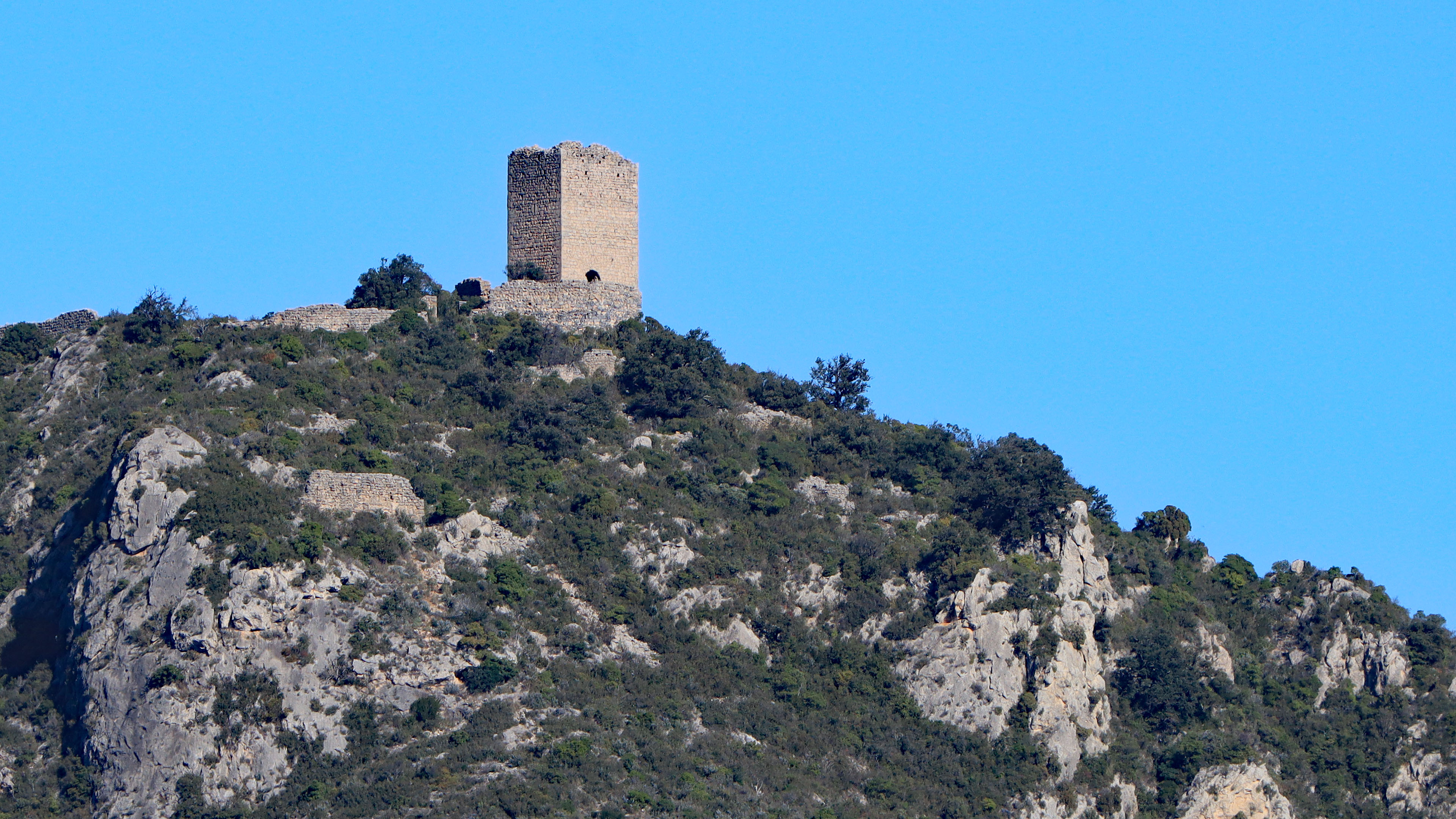
A closer view of the tower
- A fine cave cooperative, Cellier de Trémoine
- A fortified tower from the 15th c. with remaining parts of ramparts.
- An old bridge from the 16th and 17th c. on the river Tournefort.
- The ruins of the Trémoine family castle with walls from the 13th c. and a tower from the 16th and 17th c.
- Ruins of the Castellas tower from the 12th and 13th c.
- The Saint John the Baptist Church from the 18th and 19th c.
- Remains of an old church near the Tournefort bridge.
- Various old stone sheds in the vineyards.

== See also ==
- Communes of the Pyrénées-Orientales department
