= Canohès =

Canohès Cànoes (Catalan)
- Commune
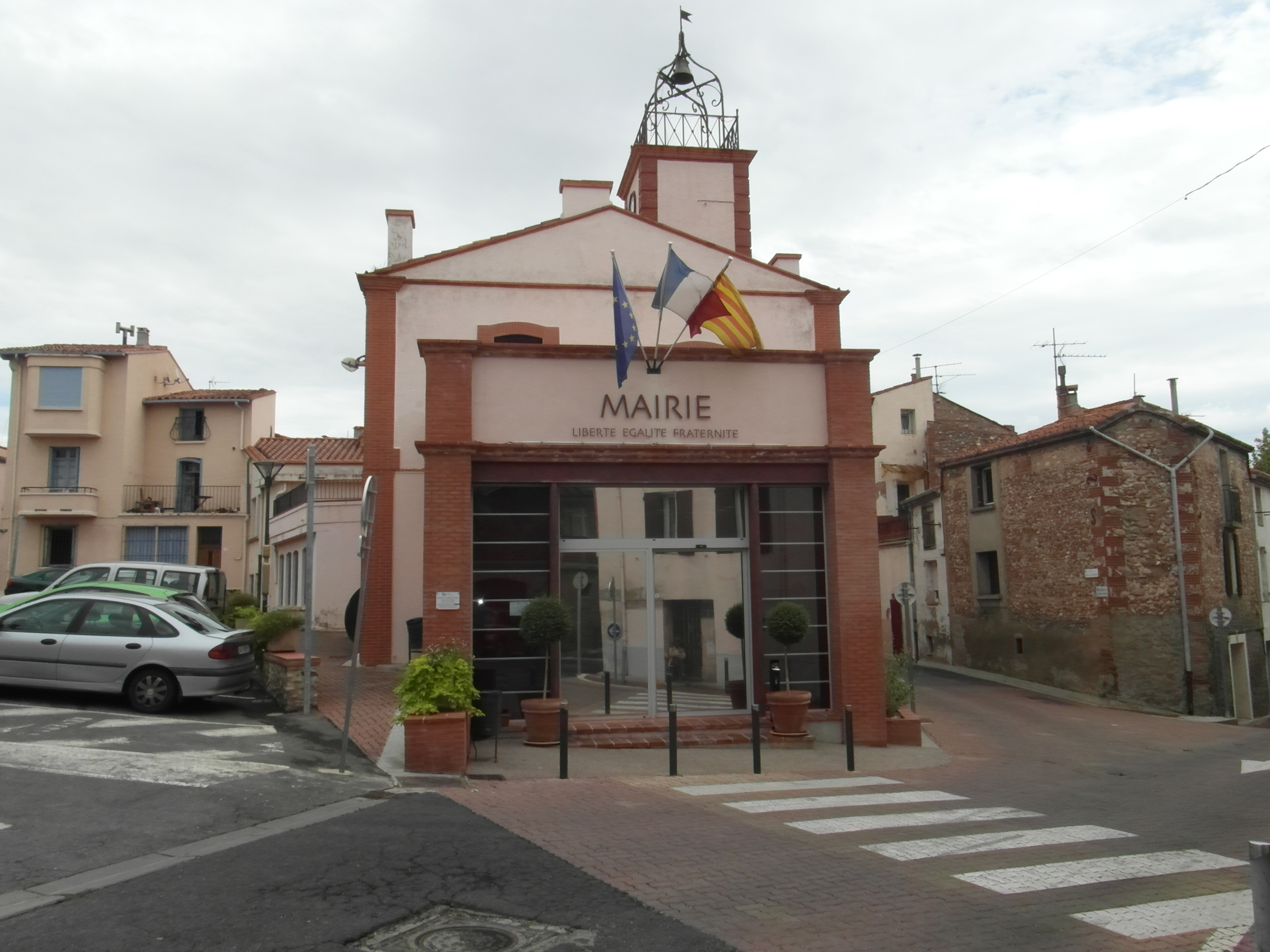
- The town hall in Canohès
- Location of Canohès
- Location within France Location within Occitanie
- Coordinates: 42°39′10″N 2°50′06″E
- Country: France
- Region: Occitania
- Department: Pyrénées-Orientales
- Arrondissement: Perpignan
- Canton: Perpignan-5
- Intercommunality: Perpignan Méditerranée Métropole

Government
  - Mayor (2020–2026): Carla Muti
- Area^{1}: 8.56 km^{2} (3.31 sq mi)
- Elevation: 71 m (233 ft)
- Highest elevation: 104 m (341 ft)
- Lowest elevation: 54 m (177 ft)
- Population (2023): 6,616
  - Density: 773/km^{2} (2,000/sq mi)
- Demonym(s): canouhard (fr) canoard, canoenc (ca)
- Time zone: UTC+01:00 (CET)
  - Summer (DST): UTC+02:00 (CEST)
- INSEE/Postal code: 66038 /66680
- ^{1} French Land Register data, which excludes lakes, ponds, glaciers > 1 km^{2} (0.386 sq mi or 247 acres) and river estuaries.

Canohès (French pronunciation: [kanɔ.ɛs]; Catalan: Cànoes [ˈkanuəs], locally [ˈkanus]) is a commune in the Pyrénées-Orientales department in southern France.

== Geography ==
=== Localisation ===
Canohès is located in the canton of Perpignan-5 and in the arrondissement of Perpignan.

It is part of the Northern Catalan comarca of Rosselló.

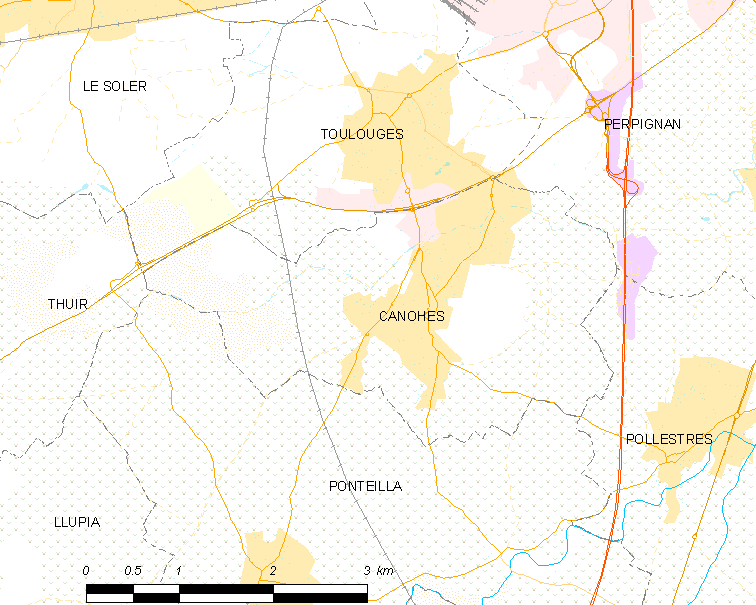
Map of Canohès and its surrounding communes

== Population ==
Historical population
Year	Pop.	±% p.a.
1968	1,512	—
1975	2,131	+5.02%
1982	2,908	+4.54%
1990	3,568	+2.59%
1999	4,349	+2.22%
2007	4,831	+1.32%
2012	4,875	+0.18%
2017	6,097	+4.58%
2023	6,616	+1.37%
Source: INSEE

== See also ==
- Communes of the Pyrénées-Orientales department
