= Cassagnes, Pyrénées-Orientales =

Cassagnes Cassanhas
- Commune
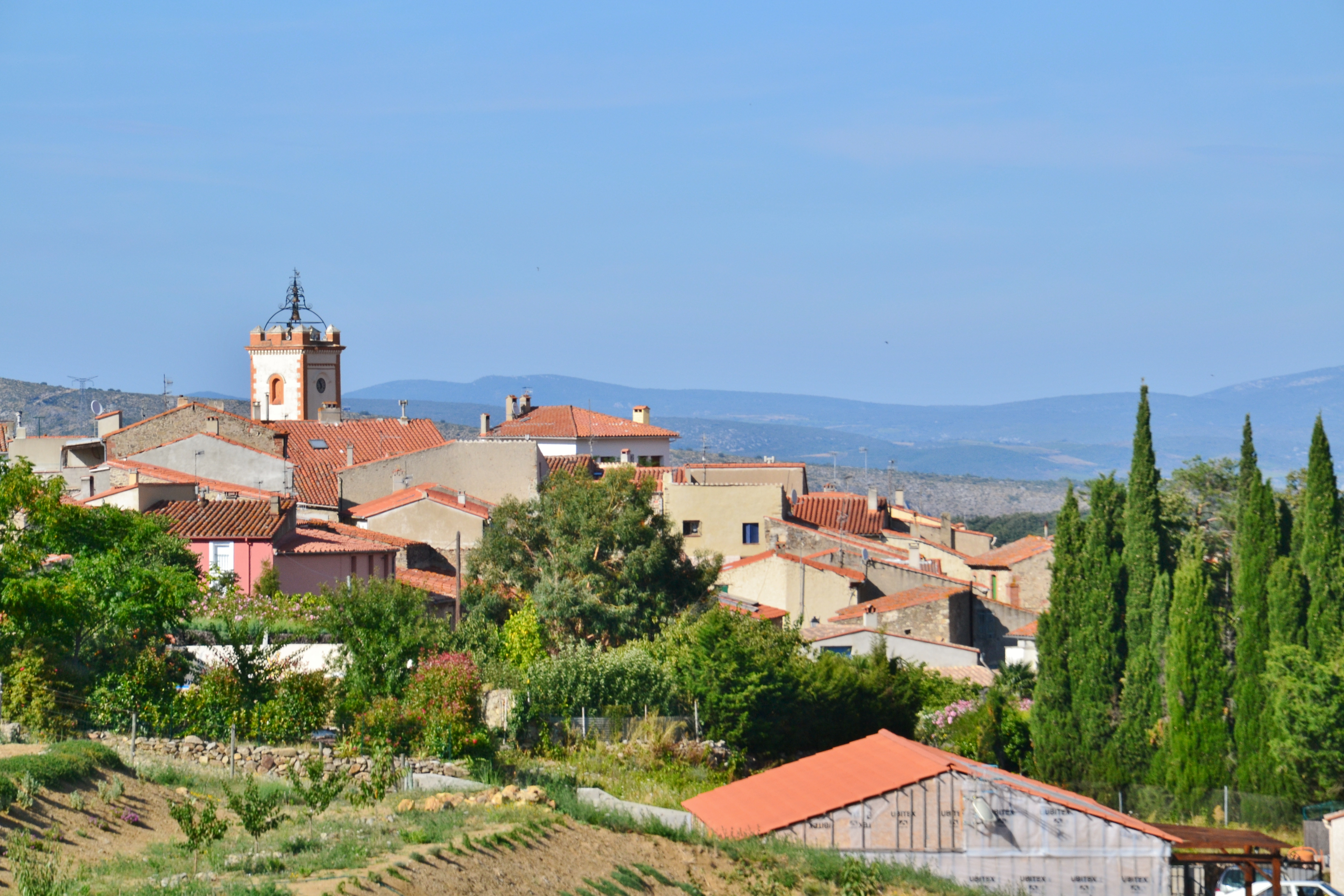
- A general view of Cassagnes

- Coat of arms
- Location of Cassagnes
- Location within France Location within Occitanie
- Coordinates: 42°44′28″N 2°36′44″E
- Country: France
- Region: Occitania
- Department: Pyrénées-Orientales
- Arrondissement: Perpignan
- Canton: La Vallée de l'Agly
- Intercommunality: Perpignan Méditerranée Métropole

Government
  - Mayor (2020–2026): Jean-Marie Marot
- Area^{1}: 15.16 km^{2} (5.85 sq mi)
- Elevation: 340 m (1,120 ft)
- Highest elevation: 540 m (1,770 ft)
- Lowest elevation: 120 m (390 ft)
- Population (2023): 294
  - Density: 19.4/km^{2} (50.2/sq mi)
- Time zone: UTC+01:00 (CET)
  - Summer (DST): UTC+02:00 (CEST)
- INSEE/Postal code: 66042 /66720
- ^{1} French Land Register data, which excludes lakes, ponds, glaciers > 1 km^{2} (0.386 sq mi or 247 acres) and river estuaries.

Cassagnes (French pronunciation: [kasaɲ]; Occitan: Cassanhas; Catalan: Cassanyes) is a commune in the Pyrénées-Orientales department in southern France.

== Geography ==
=== Localisation ===
Cassagnes is located in the canton of La Vallée de l'Agly and in the arrondissement of Perpignan.

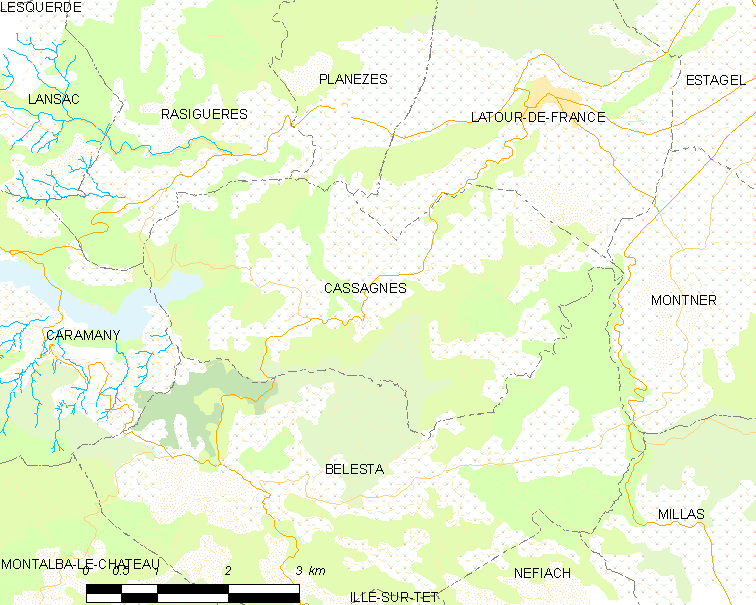
Map of Cassagnes and its surrounding communes

== Population ==
Historical population
| Year | Pop. | ±% p.a. |
|---|---|---|
| 1968 | 267 | — |
| 1975 | 203 | −3.84% |
| 1982 | 188 | −1.09% |
| 1990 | 179 | −0.61% |
| 1999 | 199 | +1.18% |
| 2007 | 247 | +2.74% |
| 2012 | 255 | +0.64% |
| 2017 | 267 | +0.92% |
| 2023 | 294 | +1.62% |
Source: INSEE

== See also ==
- Communes of the Pyrénées-Orientales department
