= Pollestres =

- Commune
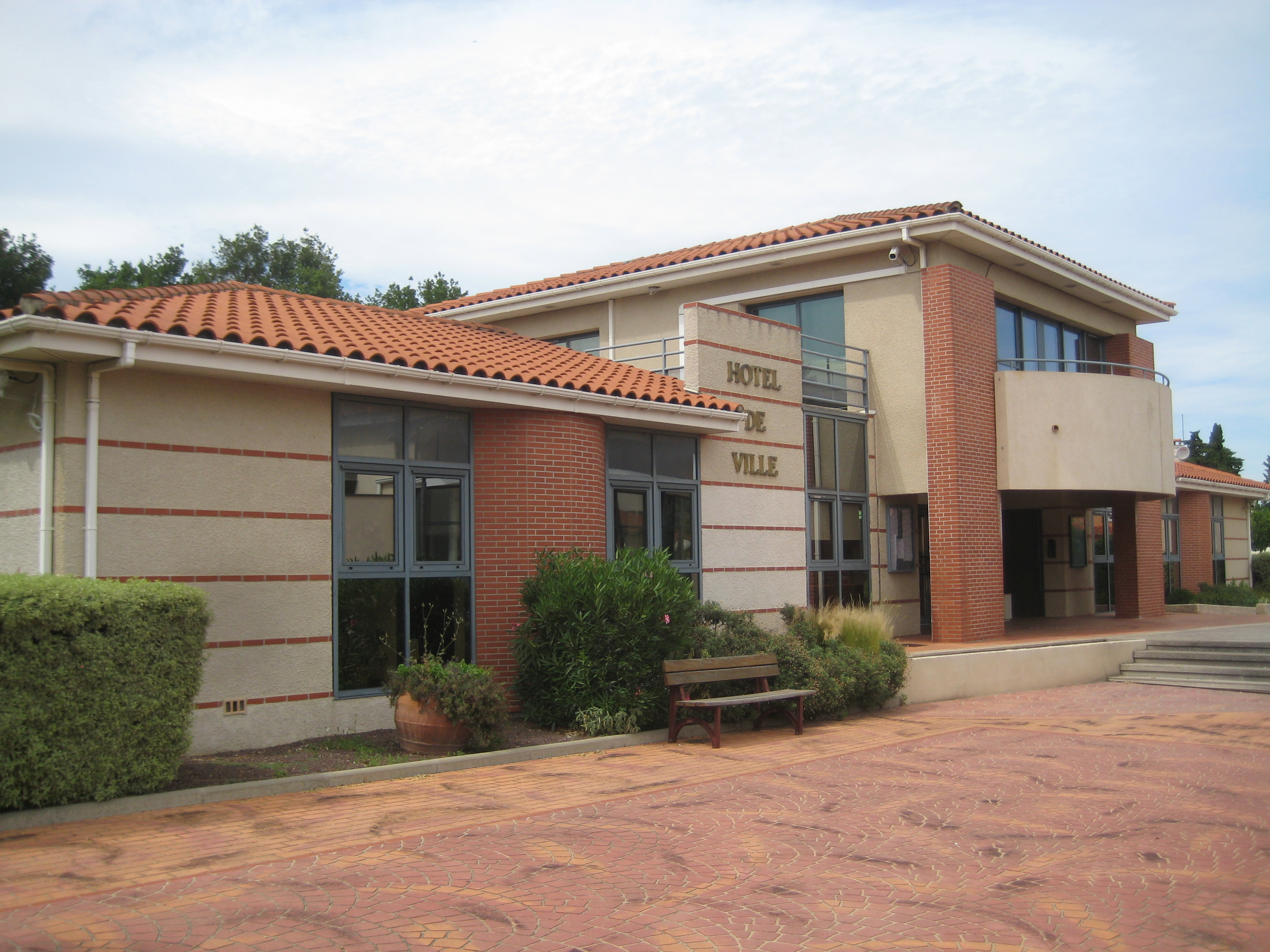
- The town hall in Pollestres, in 2011

- Coat of arms
- Location of Pollestres
- Location within France Location within Occitanie
- Coordinates: 42°38′19″N 2°52′04″E
- Country: France
- Region: Occitania
- Department: Pyrénées-Orientales
- Arrondissement: Perpignan
- Canton: Les Aspres
- Intercommunality: Perpignan Méditerranée Métropole

Government
  - Mayor (2020–2026): Jean-Charles Moriconi
- Area^{1}: 8.30 km^{2} (3.20 sq mi)
- Elevation: 43 m (141 ft)
- Highest elevation: 83 m (272 ft)
- Lowest elevation: 24 m (79 ft)
- Population (2023): 5,548
  - Density: 668/km^{2} (1,730/sq mi)
- Time zone: UTC+01:00 (CET)
  - Summer (DST): UTC+02:00 (CEST)
- INSEE/Postal code: 66144 /66450
- ^{1} French Land Register data, which excludes lakes, ponds, glaciers > 1 km^{2} (0.386 sq mi or 247 acres) and river estuaries.

Pollestres (French pronunciation: [pɔjɛstʁ]; Catalan: Pollestres) is a commune in the Pyrénées-Orientales department in southern France.

== Geography ==
Pollestres is located in the canton of Les Aspres and in the arrondissement of Perpignan.

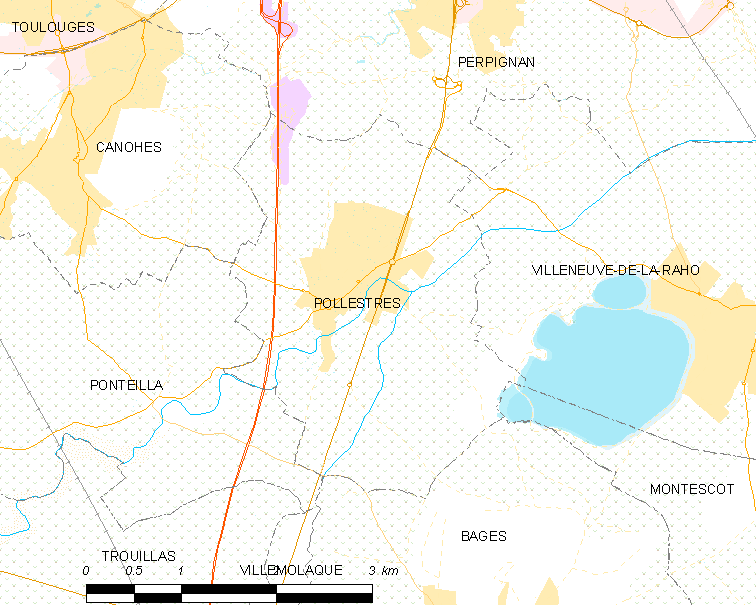
Map of Pollestres and its surrounding communes

== Population ==
Historical population
Year	Pop.	±% p.a.
1968	1,006	—
1975	1,450	+5.36%
1982	2,433	+7.67%
1990	3,019	+2.73%
1999	3,623	+2.05%
2007	3,904	+0.94%
2012	4,590	+3.29%
2017	4,887	+1.26%
2023	5,548	+2.14%
Source: INSEE

== See also ==
- Communes of the Pyrénées-Orientales department
