= Philippe Georget =

French writer

- Born: 27 August 1962 (age 64); Épinay-sur-Seine, Paris, France
- Occupation: TV anchor
- Writing career
- Genre: Crime fiction

Philippe Georget is a French writer, the author of five crime novels. He was born on 8 August 1962 in Épinay-sur-Seine and lives in Perpignan. His books have won several prizes and three have been translated into English, starting with Summertime All the Cats Are Bored in 2013.

== Novels ==
- L'été tous les chats s'ennuient, Éditions Jigal, (2009) ISBN 978-2-914704-60-1; English translation Summertime All the Cats Are Bored, Europa Editions, (2013) ISBN 978-1609451219
- Le Paradoxe du cerf-volant, Editions Jigal, (2011) ISBN 978-2-914704-75-5
- Les Violents de l'automne, Éditions Jigal, (2012) ISBN 978-2-914704-88-5; English translation, Autumn, All The Cats Return, Europa Editions, (2014) ISBN 978-1609452261
- Tendre comme les pierres, Éditions Jigal, (2014) ISBN 979-10-92016-15-4
- Méfaits d'hiver, Éditions Jigal, (2015) ISBN 979-10-92016-51-2; English translation Crimes of Winter, Europa Editions, (2017) ISBN 978-1609453893

== Awards and achievements ==
- 2011 : Prix SNCF du polar 2011 for L'été tous les chats s'ennuient
- 2011 : Prix du premier roman policier de la ville de Lens 2011 for L'été tous les chats s'ennuient
- 2013 : Prix de l'Embouchure for Les Violents de l'automne
- 2016 : Prix Méditerranée Roussillon for Méfaits d'hiver
- 2017 : Prix EuroPolar des Bibliothèques de la Ville d'Argenteuil for Le Paradoxe du cerf-volant
