= Montner =

- Commune
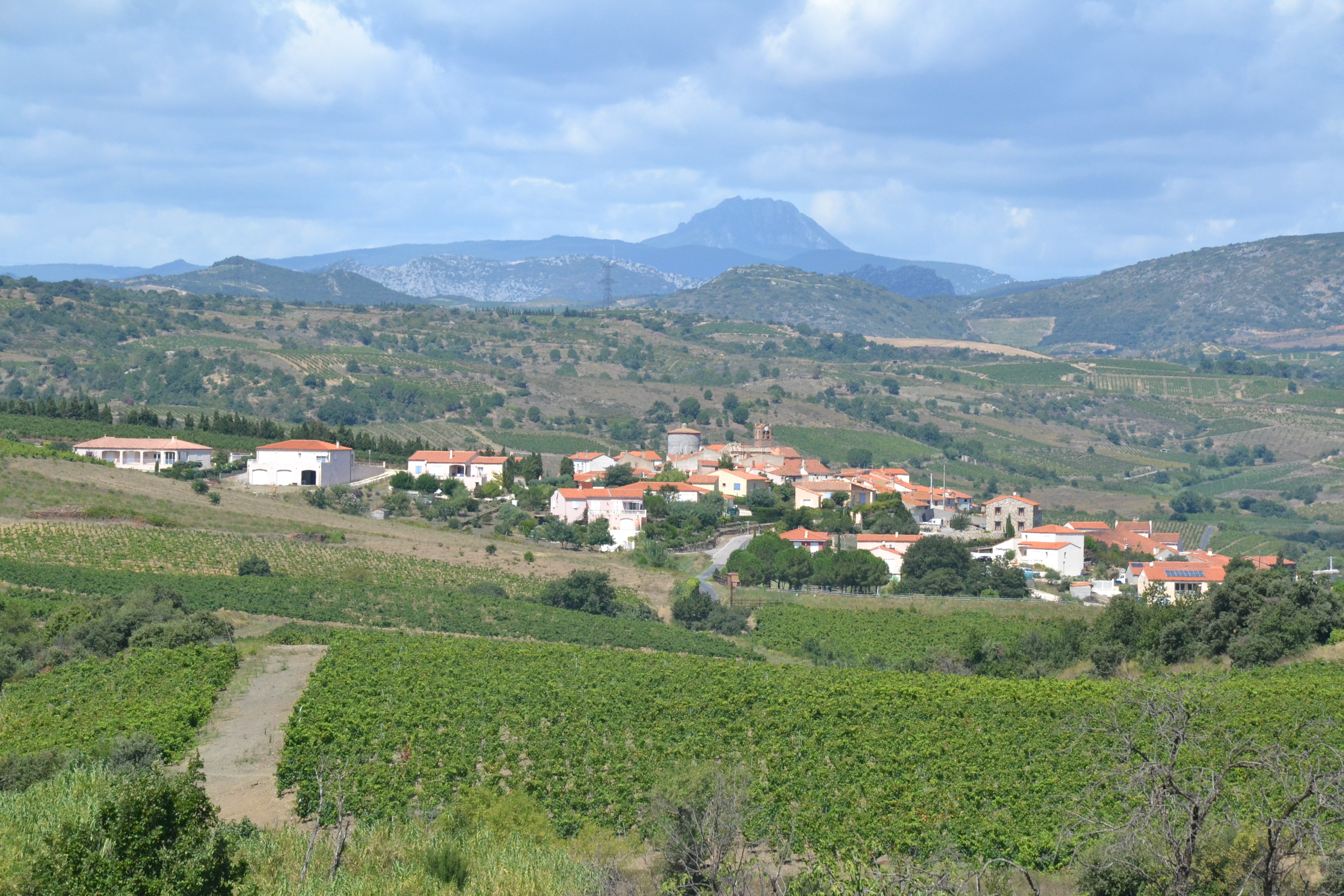
- Montner, with the Pic de Bugarach in the background

- Coat of arms
- Location of Montner
- Location within France Location within Occitanie
- Coordinates: 42°45′00″N 2°40′42″E
- Country: France
- Region: Occitania
- Department: Pyrénées-Orientales
- Arrondissement: Perpignan
- Canton: La Vallée de l'Agly
- Intercommunality: Perpignan Méditerranée Métropole

Government
  - Mayor (2020–2026): Daniel Barbaro
- Area^{1}: 10.98 km^{2} (4.24 sq mi)
- Elevation: 120 m (390 ft)
- Highest elevation: 500 m (1,600 ft)
- Lowest elevation: 89 m (292 ft)
- Population (2023): 324
  - Density: 29.5/km^{2} (76.4/sq mi)
- Time zone: UTC+01:00 (CET)
  - Summer (DST): UTC+02:00 (CEST)
- INSEE/Postal code: 66118 /66720
- ^{1} French Land Register data, which excludes lakes, ponds, glaciers > 1 km^{2} (0.386 sq mi or 247 acres) and river estuaries.

Montner (French pronunciation: [mɔ̃ne]) is a commune in the Pyrénées-Orientales department in southern France.

== Geography ==
Montner is located in the canton of La Vallée de l'Agly and in the arrondissement of Perpignan.

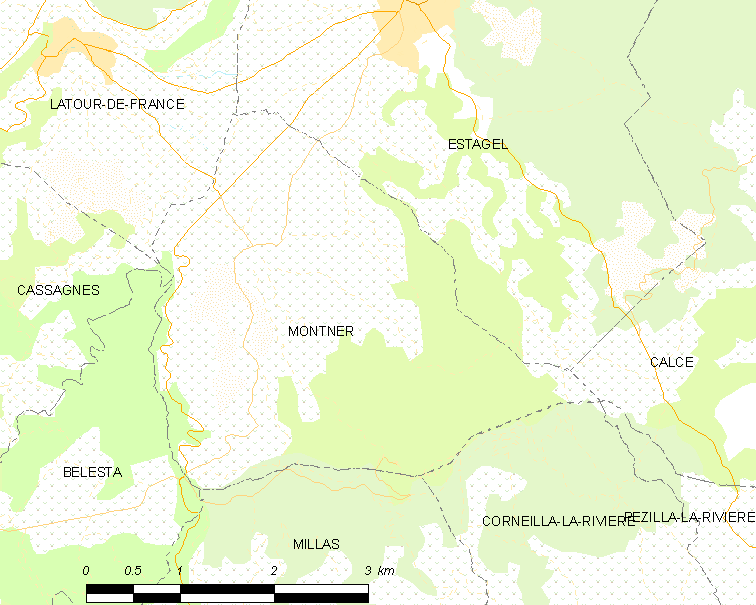
Map of Montner and its surrounding communes

== Population ==
Historical population
Year	Pop.	±% p.a.
1968	318	—
1975	247	−3.55%
1982	247	+0.00%
1990	261	+0.69%
1999	244	−0.75%
2007	311	+3.08%
2012	311	+0.00%
2017	348	+2.27%
2023	324	−1.18%
Source: INSEE

== See also ==
- Communes of the Pyrénées-Orientales department
