= Canton of Perpignan-3 =

Canton of France

Coordinates: 42.6870°N 2.9230°E

The Canton of Perpignan-3 is a French canton of Pyrénées-Orientales department, in Occitanie.

== Composition ==
The canton includes the commune of Cabestany and the southeastern part of Perpignan. At the French canton reorganisation which came into effect in March 2015, the canton was enlarged.

Before 2015, the canton included Cabestany and the following neighbourhoods of Perpignan:

- Saint-Gaudérique
- Champ de Mars
- Saint-Vincens
