= Perpignan =

Perpignan Perpinyà (Catalan)
- Prefecture and commune
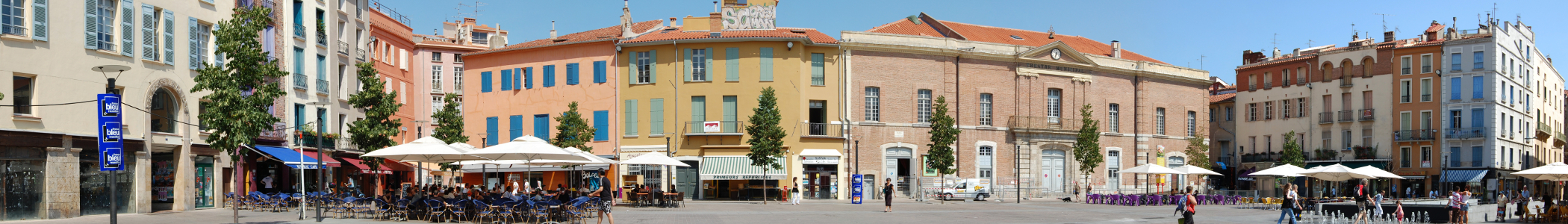
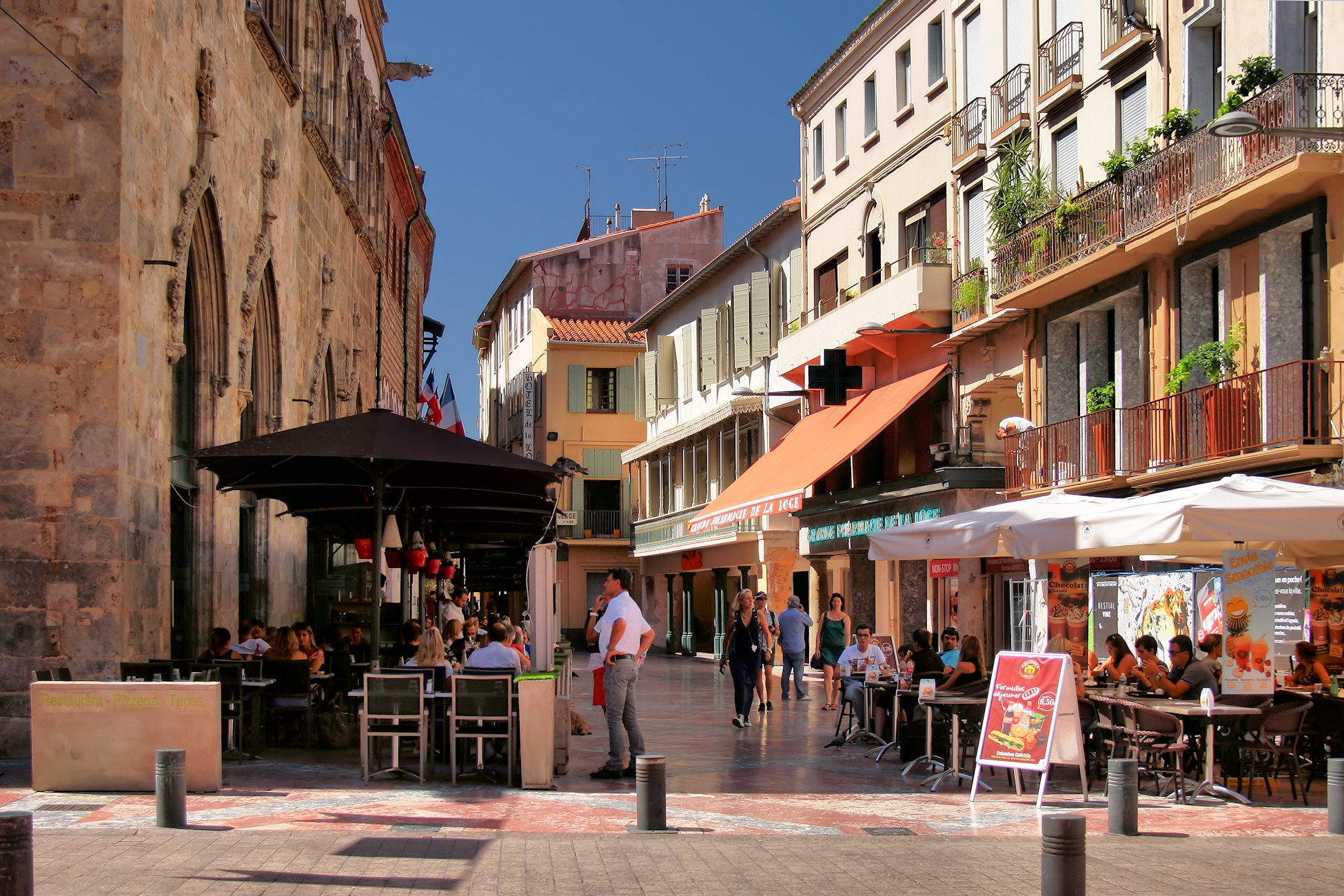
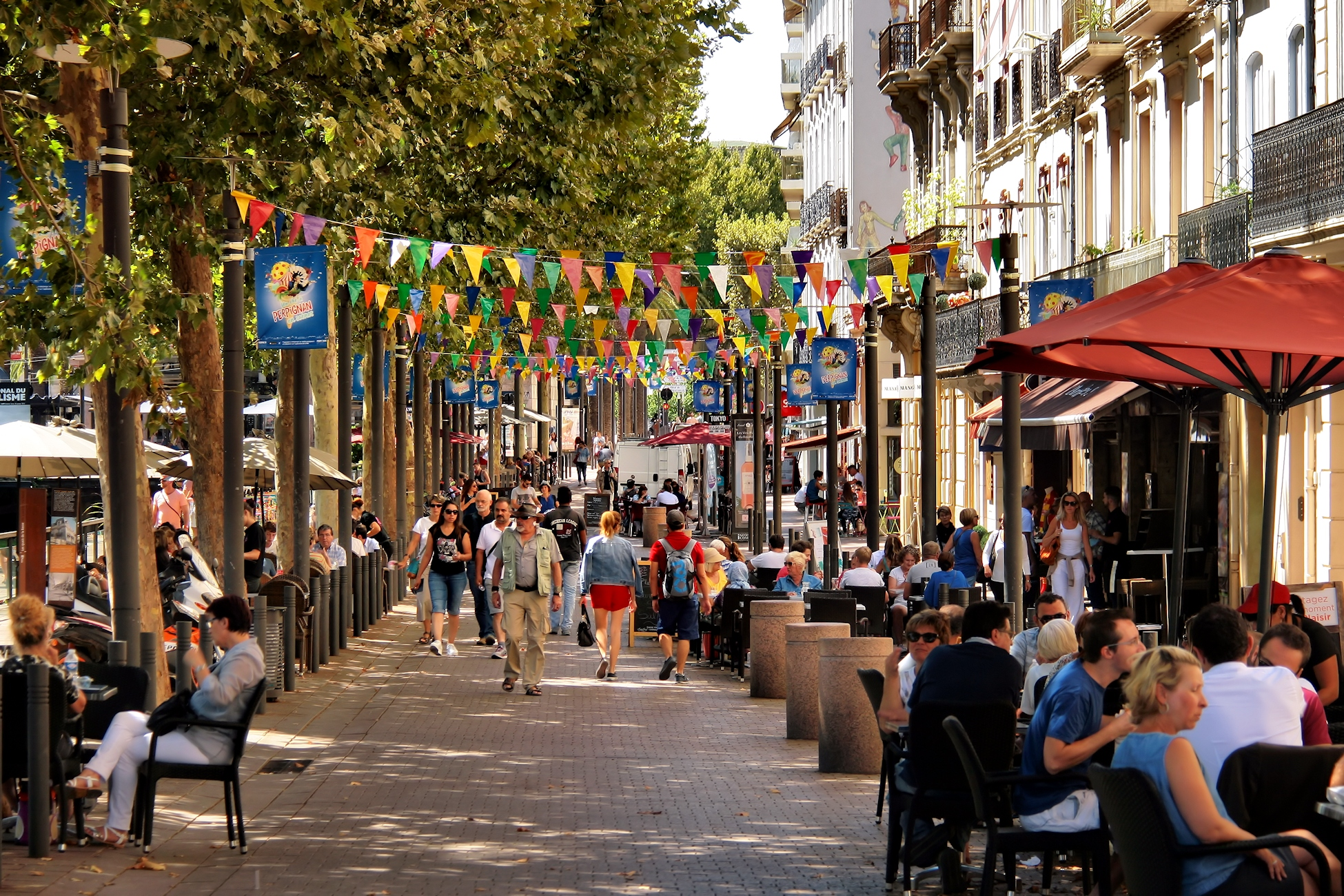
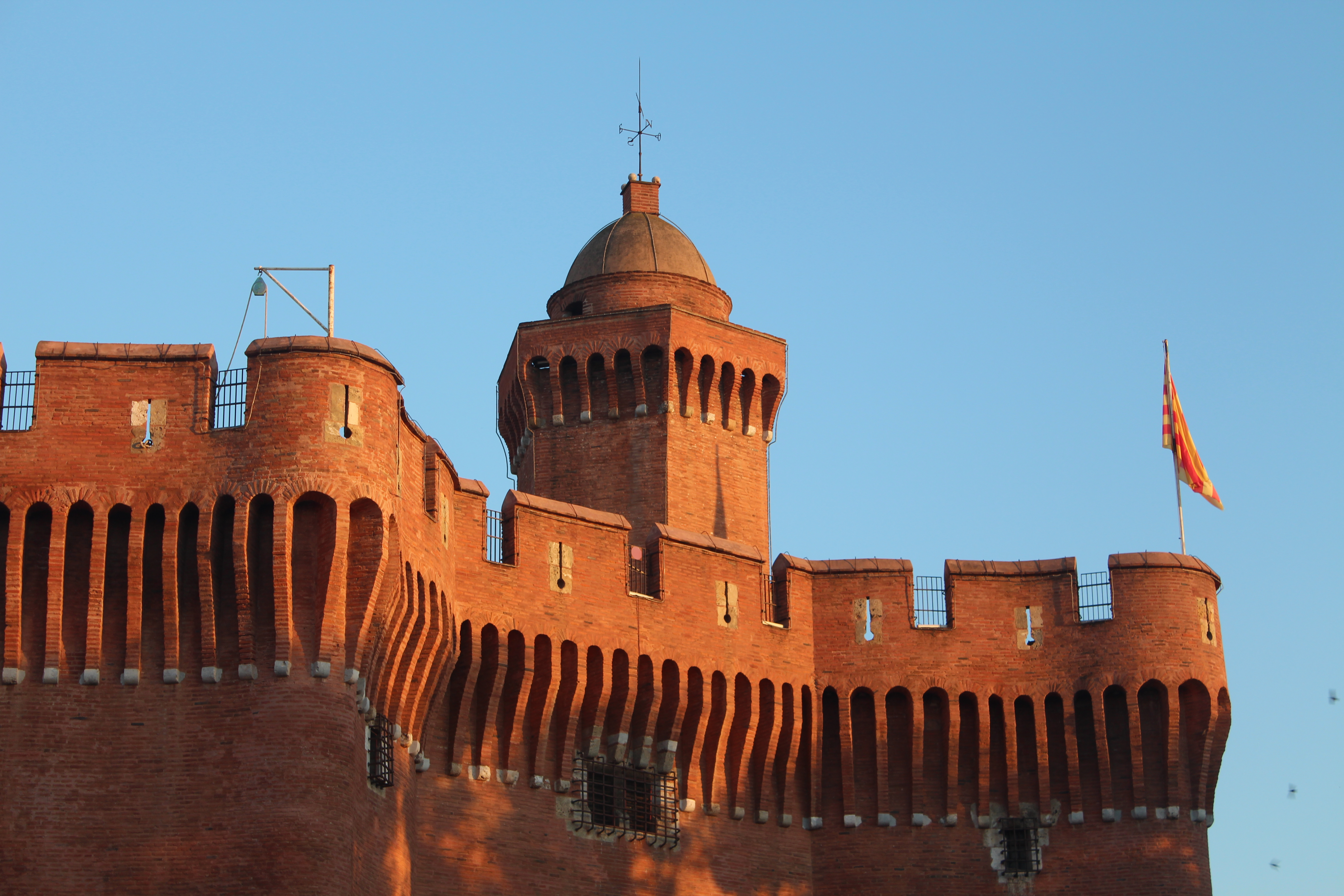

- Coat of arms
- Location of Perpignan
- Location within France Location within Occitanie
- Coordinates: 42°41′55″N 2°53′44″E
- Country: France
- Region: Occitania
- Department: Pyrénées-Orientales
- Arrondissement: Perpignan
- Canton: Perpignan-1, 2, 3, 4, 5 and 6
- Intercommunality: Perpignan Méditerranée Métropole

Government
  - Mayor (2026–32): Louis Aliot (RN)
- Area^{1}: 68.07 km^{2} (26.28 sq mi)
- Elevation: 30 m (98 ft)
- Highest elevation: 95 m (312 ft)
- Lowest elevation: 8 m (26 ft)
- Population (2023): 121,616
  - Density: 1,787/km^{2} (4,627/sq mi)
- Demonym(s): Perpignanais (masc.), Perpignanaise (fem.) (French) perpinyanès (masc.), perpinyanesa (fem.) (Catalan)
- Time zone: UTC+01:00 (CET)
  - Summer (DST): UTC+02:00 (CEST)
- INSEE/Postal code: 66136 /66000
- Website: Mairie-Perpignan.fr (in French)
- ^{1} French Land Register data, which excludes lakes, ponds, glaciers > 1 km^{2} (0.386 sq mi or 247 acres) and river estuaries.

Perpignan (UK: /ˈpɜːrpɪnjɒ̃/, US: /ˌpɛərpiːˈnjɑːn/, French: [pɛʁpiɲɑ̃]; Catalan: Perpinyà [pəɾpiˈɲa]; Occitan: Perpinhan [peɾpiˈɲa]) is the prefecture of the Pyrénées-Orientales department in Southern France, in the heart of the plain of Roussillon, at the foot of the Pyrenees a few kilometres from the Mediterranean Sea and the scrublands of the Corbières massif. It is the centre of the Perpignan Méditerranée Métropole metropolitan area.

In 2021, Perpignan had a population of 119,656 in the commune proper, and the agglomeration had a total population of 205,183, making it the last major French city before the Spanish border. Perpignan is sometimes seen as the "entrance" to the Iberian Peninsula.

Perpignan was the capital of the former province and County of Roussillon (Rosselló in Catalan) and continental capital of the Kingdom of Majorca in the 13th and 14th centuries, as well as one of the most important cities of the Principality of Catalonia. It has preserved an extensive old centre with its bodegas in the historic centre, coloured houses in a series of picturesque streets and alleys stretching between the banks of the Têt and its tributary, the Basse.

The city is also known for its International Festival of Photojournalism, the medieval Trobades festival and its centuries-old garnet industry.

== Geography ==
=== Location ===
Perpignan is located in the center of the Roussillon plain, 13 km west of the Mediterranean coast. It is the southernmost city of metropolitan France.

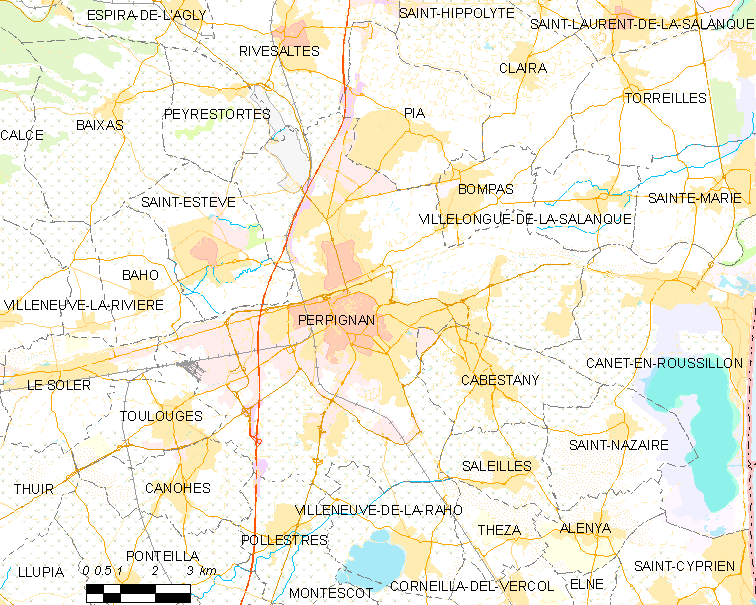
Map of Perpignan and its surrounding communes

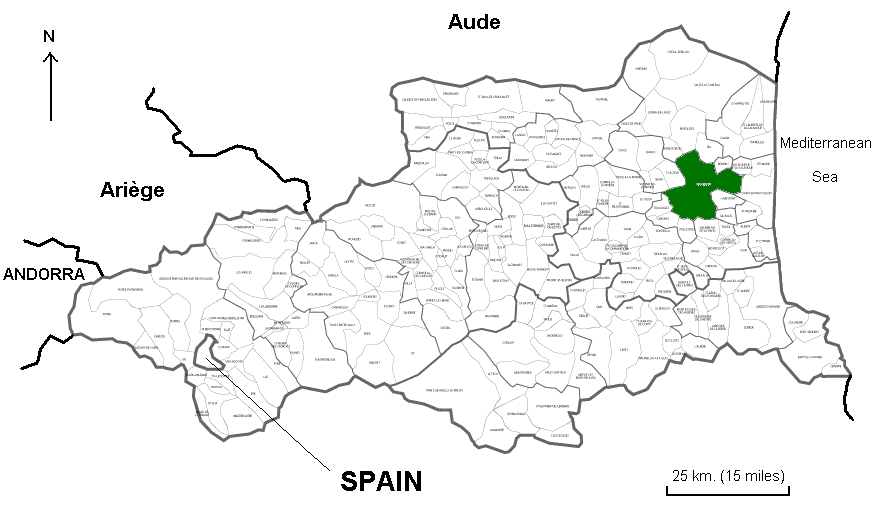
Location within the Pyrénées-Orientales département.

=== Hydrography ===
Perpignan is crossed by the largest river in Roussillon, the Têt, and by one of its tributaries, the Basse. Floods have occurred, as in 1892 when the rising of the Têt in Perpignan destroyed 39 houses, leaving more than 60 families homeless.

=== Climate ===
Perpignan has a typical hot-summer Mediterranean climate (Köppen Csa), similar to much of the Mediterranean coastline of France. One might expect rain to be rare in the city, but the annual precipitation levels are similar to the national average. However, the city is known for its patchy rains, with weeks or even months of rain falling in a matter of hours, followed by several weeks without a drop of water. Perpignan experiences very hot summers and fairly mild winters. Temperatures can reach 40 °C (104 °F), while there has been little snow for decades. Most precipitation occurs in the cold season, with summers being extremely dry. A fresh north-westerly wind often blows, the Tramontana (Catalan: Tramuntana, prononced [tɾəmun̪tanə]; French: Tramontane, pronounced [tʁamɔ̃tan]), keeping the sky clear much of the time and resulting in high annual sunshine. But the presence of this wind makes winters colder than would be expected from the geographical position of the city.

Climate data for Perpignan (1991–2020 normals), extremes since 1924
Month	Jan	Feb	Mar	Apr	May	Jun	Jul	Aug	Sep	Oct	Nov	Dec	Year
Record high °C (°F)	25.0 (77.0)	26.5 (79.7)	28.0 (82.4)	32.4 (90.3)	34.4 (93.9)	42.4 (108.3)	40.5 (104.9)	39.9 (103.8)	39.4 (102.9)	34.2 (93.6)	28.1 (82.6)	26.7 (80.1)	42.4 (108.3)
Mean daily maximum °C (°F)	12.7 (54.9)	13.4 (56.1)	16.4 (61.5)	18.7 (65.7)	22.3 (72.1)	26.8 (80.2)	29.5 (85.1)	29.4 (84.9)	25.6 (78.1)	21.2 (70.2)	16.3 (61.3)	13.3 (55.9)	20.5 (68.8)
Daily mean °C (°F)	8.7 (47.7)	9.2 (48.6)	12.0 (53.6)	14.2 (57.6)	17.8 (64.0)	22.0 (71.6)	24.6 (76.3)	24.5 (76.1)	20.9 (69.6)	17.0 (62.6)	12.3 (54.1)	9.3 (48.7)	16.0 (60.9)
Mean daily minimum °C (°F)	4.8 (40.6)	5.0 (41.0)	7.6 (45.7)	9.7 (49.5)	13.3 (55.9)	17.2 (63.0)	19.7 (67.5)	19.7 (67.5)	16.1 (61.0)	12.9 (55.2)	8.4 (47.1)	5.3 (41.5)	11.6 (53.0)
Record low °C (°F)	−8.2 (17.2)	−11.0 (12.2)	−5.9 (21.4)	0.2 (32.4)	2.4 (36.3)	7.4 (45.3)	11.2 (52.2)	10.4 (50.7)	5.0 (41.0)	1.2 (34.2)	−5.7 (21.7)	−6.3 (20.7)	−11.0 (12.2)
Average precipitation mm (inches)	60.1 (2.37)	40.9 (1.61)	51.6 (2.03)	66.1 (2.60)	45.6 (1.80)	23.6 (0.93)	15.1 (0.59)	22.7 (0.89)	43.0 (1.69)	82.1 (3.23)	72.6 (2.86)	54.9 (2.16)	578.3 (22.76)
Average precipitation days (≥ 1 mm)	5.0	3.8	4.9	6.2	5.7	3.8	2.6	3.1	4.4	5.0	4.9	4.7	54.1
Average relative humidity (%)	70	68	64	64	66	62	59	63	68	73	71	71	67
Mean monthly sunshine hours	141	164	207	220	241	268	300	273	224	175	147	131	2,491
Source 1: Météo France
Source 2: Infoclimat.fr (humidity, 1961–1990)

=== Transport ===
Roads

The A9 motorway connects Perpignan with Barcelona and Montpellier.

Trains

Perpignan is served by the Gare de Perpignan railway station, which offers connections to Paris, Barcelona, Toulouse, and several regional destinations. Salvador Dalí proclaimed the station to be the "Cosmic Centre of the Universe" after experiencing a vision there in 1963.

Airport

The nearest airport is Perpignan–Rivesaltes Airport. However, the airport only provides flights to limited European destinations. The nearest major international airports are Montpellier - Méditerranée Airport, located 160 km (99 mi) north east, Josep Tarradellas Barcelona–El Prat Airport, located 204 km (127 mi) south and Toulouse–Blagnac Airport, located 217 km (135 mi) north west of Perpignan.

== Toponymy ==
The name of Perpignan appears in 927 as Perpinianum, followed in 959 by Villa Perpiniano, Pirpinianum in the 11th century, and Perpiniani in 1176. Perpenyà, which appears in the 13th century, was the most common form until the 15th century, and was still used in the 17th century. It probably derives from the Roman name Perpennius.

The city is sometimes nicknamed Perpi for short.

== History ==
Historical affiliations

- County of Roussillon 927–1172
- Principality of Catalonia ( Crown of Aragon) 1172–1276
- → Kingdom of Majorca 1276–1344
- Principality of Catalonia ( Crown of Aragon) 1344–1463
- Kingdom of France 1463–1493
- Principality of Catalonia ( Crown of Aragon, Spanish Empire) 1493–1659
- → Kingdom of France 1659–1792
- → French Republic 1792–1804
- French Empire 1804–1815
- → Kingdom of France 1815–1848
- French Republic 1848–1852
- French Empire 1852–1870
- French Republic 1870–1940
- French State 1940–1944
- French Republic 1944–present

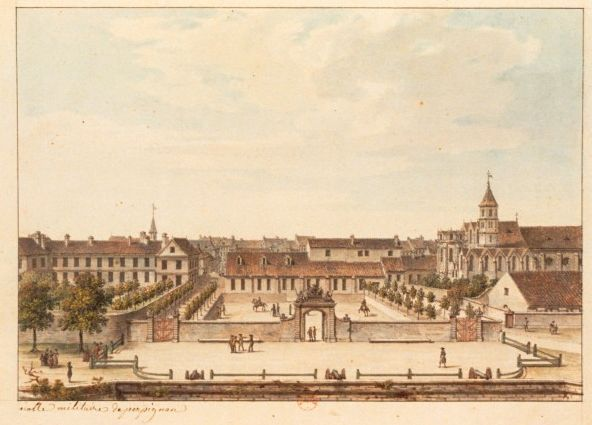
Perpignan c. 1780

Though settlement in the area goes back to Roman times, the medieval town of Perpignan seems to have been founded around the beginning of the 10th century. Shortly afterwards, Perpignan became the capital of the counts of Roussillon. Historically, it was part of the region known as Septimania. In 1172 Count Girard II bequeathed his lands to the Counts of Barcelona. Perpignan acquired the institutions of a partly self-governing commune in 1197. French feudal rights over Roussillon were given up by Louis IX in the Treaty of Corbeil.

When James I the Conqueror, king of Aragon and count of Barcelona, founded the Kingdom of Majorca in 1276, Perpignan became the capital of the mainland territories of the new state. The subsequent decades are considered the city's historical golden age. It prospered as a centre of cloth manufacture, leatherwork, goldsmithery, and other luxury crafts. King Philippe III of France died there in 1285, as he was returning from his unsuccessful crusade against the Aragonese Crown.

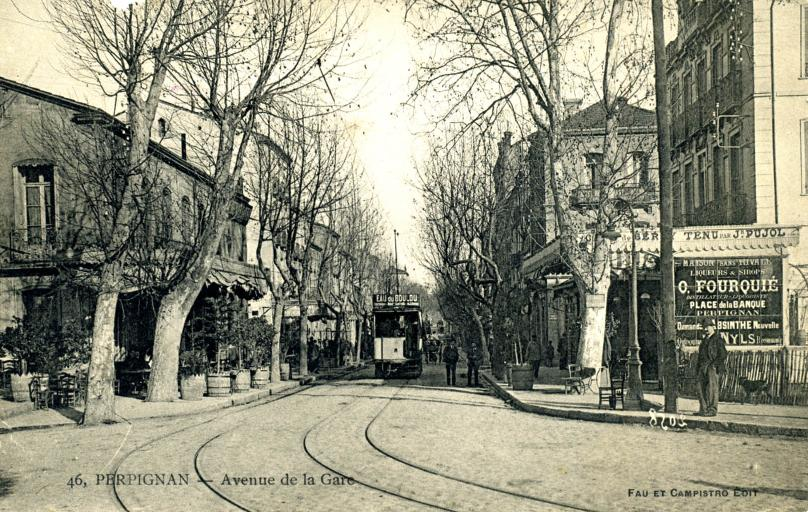
Perpignan c. 1905

In 1344 Peter IV of Aragon annexed the Kingdom of Majorca and Perpignan once more became part of the Principality of Catalonia. A few years later it lost approximately half of its population to the Black Death. It was attacked and occupied by Louis XI in 1463; a violent uprising against French rule in 1473 was harshly put down after a long siege, but in 1493 Charles VIII, wishing to conciliate Castile in order to free himself to invade Italy, restored it to Ferdinand II of Aragon.

Again besieged and captured by the French during the Thirty Years' War in September 1642, Perpignan was formally ceded by Spain 17 years later in the Treaty of the Pyrenees, and thereafter remained a French possession.

In June 2020, Louis Aliot of the National Rally was elected mayor of Perpignan. This was the first time since 1995 that the far-right party had won a city of more than 100,000 people.

== Government and politics ==
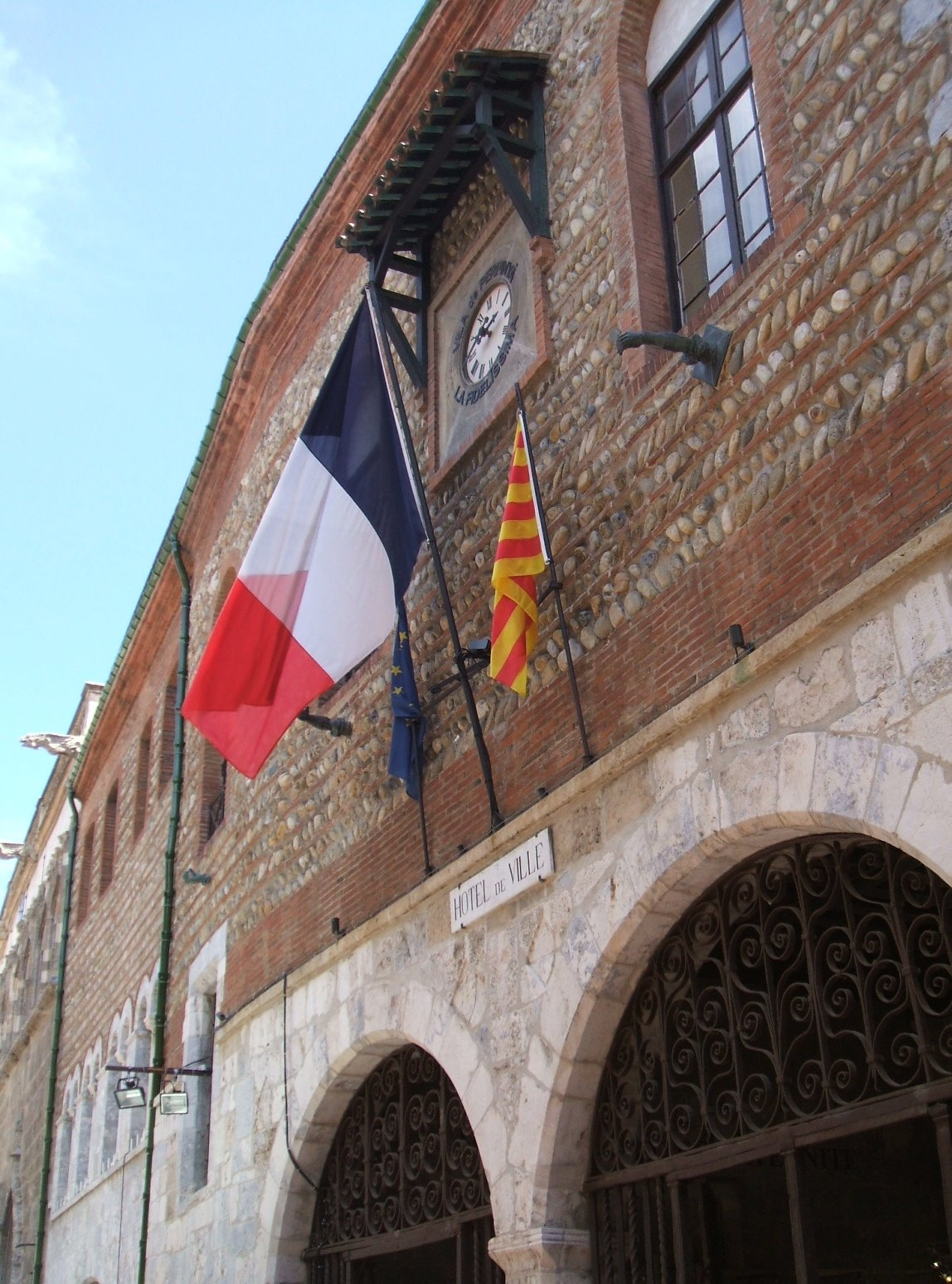
The Hôtel de Ville (City Hall)

The Hôtel de Ville (City Hall) dates back to 1318.

=== Mayors ===
Mayor	Term start	Term end
Edmond Benoit	July 1910	May 1911
Léon Nérel	May 1911	May 1912
Joseph Denis	May 1912	May 1929
Victor Dalbiez	May 1929	May 1935
Jean Payra	May 1935	29 May 1937 (death)
Laurent Baudru	June 1937	December 1940
Antoine Castillon	December 1940	March 1941
Ferdinand Coudray	March 1941	August 1944
Félix Mercader	August 1944	11 March 1949 (death)
Félix Depardon	April 1949	March 1959
Paul Alduy	March 1959	May 1993
Jean-Paul Alduy	June 1993	27 April 2009 (election of 2008 cancelled)
Bernard Bacou (retired magistrate acting as mayor)	27 April 2009	5 July 2009
Jean-Paul Alduy	5 July 2009	15 October 2009 (resignation)
Jean-Marc Pujol	22 October 2009	3 July 2020
Louis Aliot	3 July 2020	

=== International relations ===
Twin towns – sister cities

Perpignan is twinned with:

Hanover, Germany, since 1960; Lancaster, England, United Kingdom, since 1962; Lake Charles, Louisiana, United States, since 1993	Sarasota, Florida, United States, since 1994; Tyre, Lebanon, since 1997; Lleida, Catalonia, Spain since 2005

Partner towns

Girona, Catalonia, Spain, since 1988; Barcelona, Catalonia, Spain, since 1994; Figueres, Catalonia, Spain, since 1996	Ma'alot-Tarshiha, Israel, since 1998; Tavira, Portugal, since 2001

== Education ==
More than 10,000 students between the ages of 2 and 12 attend 61 preschools and primary schools in the city. Perpignan also has 26 high schools.

== Population ==
Historical population

Year	Pop.	±% p.a.
1793	9,134	—
1800	10,415	+1.89%
1806	12,499	+3.09%
1821	14,864	+1.16%
1831	17,114	+1.42%
1836	17,618	+0.58%
1841	20,792	+3.37%
1846	22,706	+1.78%
1851	21,783	−0.83%
1856	23,301	+1.36%
1861	23,462	+0.14%
1866	25,264	+1.49%
1872	27,378	+1.35%
1876	28,353	+0.88%
1881	31,735	+2.28%
1886	34,183	+1.50%
1891	33,878	−0.18%
1896	35,088	+0.70%
1901	36,157	+0.60%

Year	Pop.	±% p.a.
1906	38,898	+1.47%
1911	39,510	+0.31%
1921	53,742	+3.12%
1926	68,835	+5.07%
1931	73,962	+1.45%
1936	72,207	−0.48%
1946	74,984	+0.38%
1954	70,051	−0.85%
1962	83,025	+2.15%
1968	102,191	+3.52%
1975	106,426	+0.58%
1982	111,669	+0.69%
1990	105,983	−0.65%
1999	105,115	−0.09%
2007	116,041	+1.24%
2012	120,489	+0.76%
2017	120,158	−0.06%
2023	121,616	+0.20%

Source: EHESS and INSEE (1968-2023)

== Culture ==
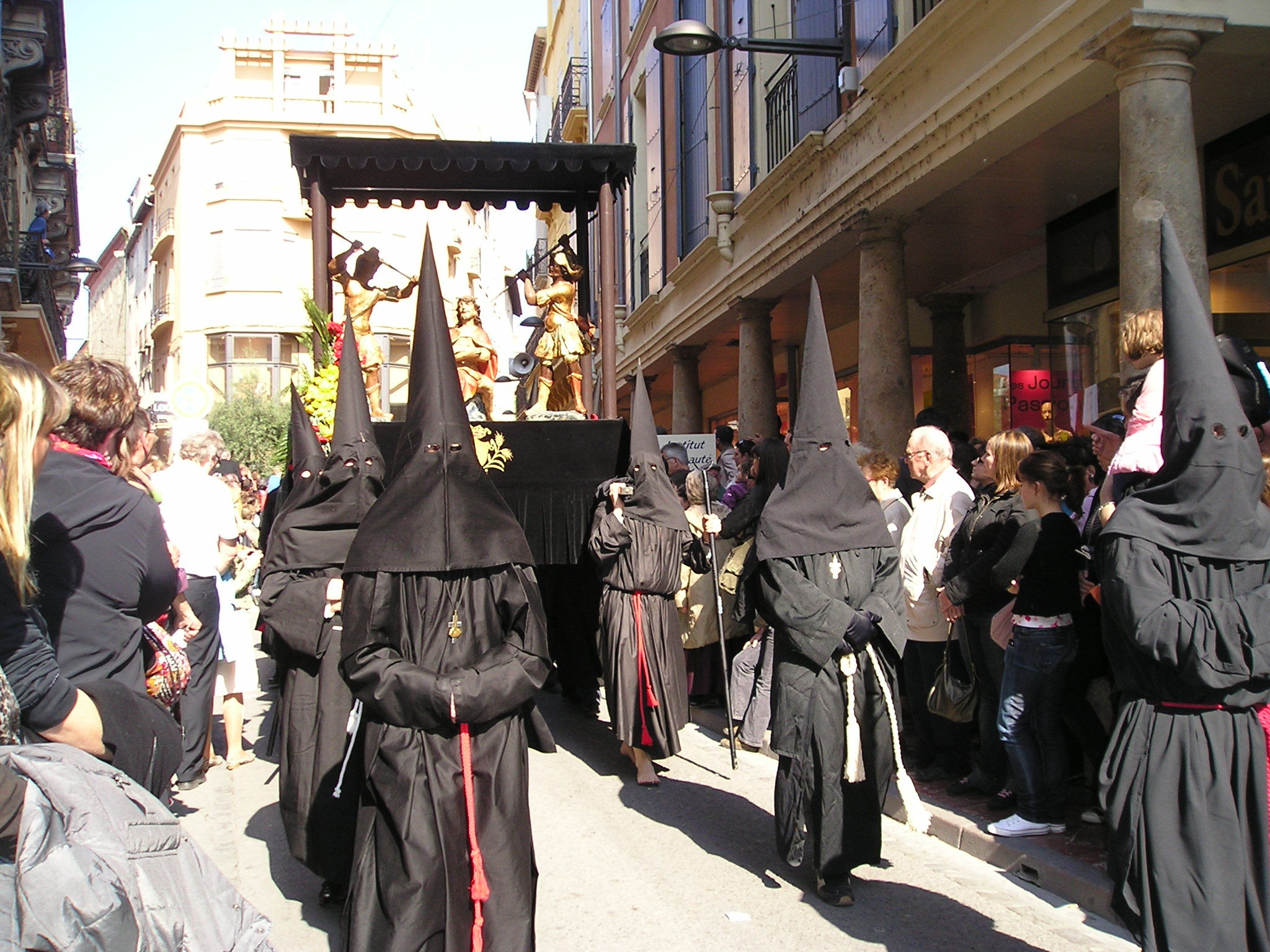
The famous "Sanch Procession" folklore celebrated in Perpignan, Arles-sur-Tech, and Collioure.

Since 2004, the free three-day Guitares au Palais has been held each year in the last weekend of August in the Palace of the Kings of Majorca. The festival has a broad mainstream focus with pop-related music as well as traditional acoustic guitar music and alternative music. The festival has attracted international guests like Caetano Veloso (2007), Rumberos Catalans, Pedro Soler, Bernardo Sandoval, Peter Finger, and Aaron and Bryce Dessner (2008).

Each September, Perpignan hosts the internationally renowned Visa pour l'Image festival of photojournalism. Free exhibitions are mounted in the Couvent des Minimes, Chapelle des Dominicaines and other buildings in the old town.

In 2008, Perpignan became Capital of Catalan Culture. Many street name signs in the city are in both French and Catalan.

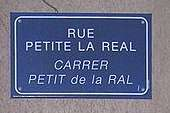
Perpignan street name sign in French and Catalan.

== Sport ==
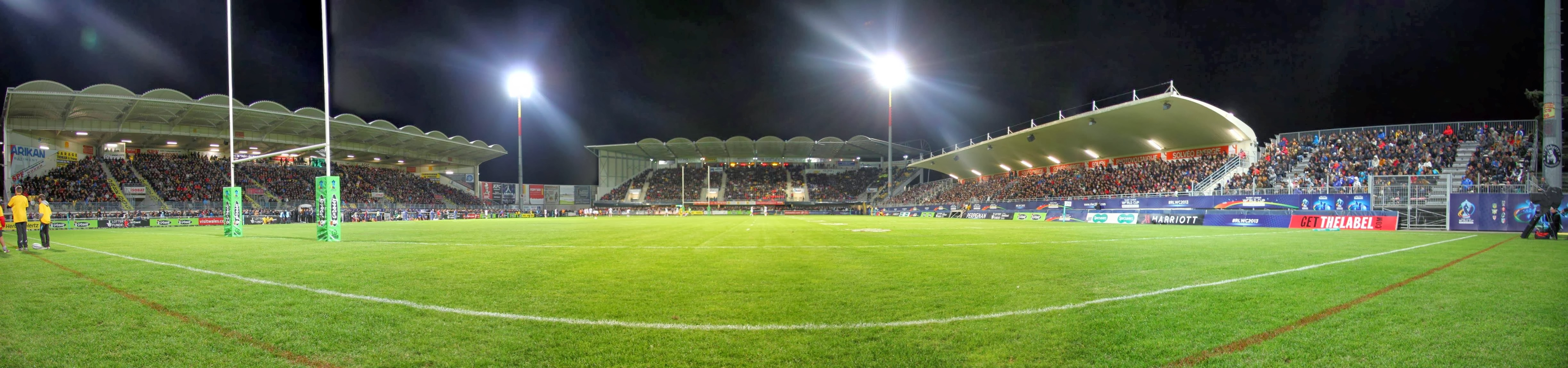
Rugby league side Catalans Dragons' Stade Gilbert Brutus.

Like the rest of the south of France, Perpignan is a rugby stronghold. Their rugby union side, USA Perpignan, are regular competitors in the European Rugby Champions Cup and have been champions of the French Top 14 seven times (most recently in 2009). They play at the Stade Aimé Giral.

Their rugby league team Catalans Dragons plays in the British Super League. The Dragons' games in Perpignan against the Northern English-based sides are usually very popular with British rugby fans, with thousands descending on the city on the day of the game, including many holidaying fans travelling up from the Spanish Costa Brava to join those who came directly from the UK. The club was founded in 2000 as a merger of XIII Catalan with the nearby team AS Saint Estève to form Union Treiziste Catalane in 2000 who changed their name to Catalans Dragons upon transfer from the French to British rugby league system. The Dragons became the first non-English team to win the Challenge Cup when they defeated Warrington Wolves in the 2018 final. They are based at Stade Gilbert Brutus. AS Saint Estève's youth teams still operates as Saint-Estève XIII Mavericks in the National Division 2, while a new Elite One Championship club was formed in 2000 under the name Saint-Estève XIII Catalan which is in effect Catalans Dragons reserves; both play at the Stade Municipal in the suburb of Saint-Estève.

The local association football team is Canet Roussillon FC.

There is also an Australian rules football club, Perpignan Tigers, and American football club Grizzlys Catalans.

The Roussillon Grand Prix was a Grand Prix motor racing event that was held between 1946 and 1949 in the streets of Perpignan.

== Economy ==
Traditional commerce was in wine, olive oil, corks (the cork oak Quercus suber grows in Perpignan's mild climate), wool, leather, and iron. In May 1907 it was a seat of agitation by southern producers for government enforcement of wine quality following a collapse in prices. JOB rolling papers are currently manufactured in Perpignan.

== Sites of interest ==
Construction work on Perpignan Cathedral began in 1324 and finished in 1509.

The 13th century Palace of the Kings of Majorca sits on the high citadel, surrounded by ramparts, reinforced for Louis XI and Charles V, which were updated in the 17th century by Louis XIV's military engineer Vauban.

The walls surrounding the town, which had likewise been designed by Vauban, were razed in 1904 to accommodate urban development. The main city gate, the Castillet is a small fortress built in the 14th century, which has been preserved. It was also used as a prison until the end of the 19th century.

The Hôtel Pams is a lavishly decorated mansion designed for Jules Pams that illustrates the artistic tastes of the wealthy bourgeois at the turn of the 20th century.

Les Halles de Vauban are a new addition to the banks of the city's canal. Opened in November 2017, the indoor markets are privately owned and cost €1.5 million. Split into two locations, vendors offer fresh fruit and vegetables, bread, flowers, cheese, and other items. There is a bar and central eating court with a range of tapas, burgers, omelettes and food from around the world.

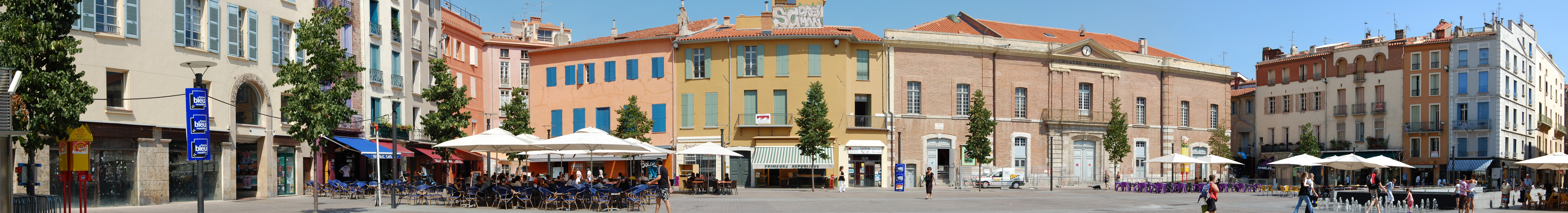
Place de la République and theatre

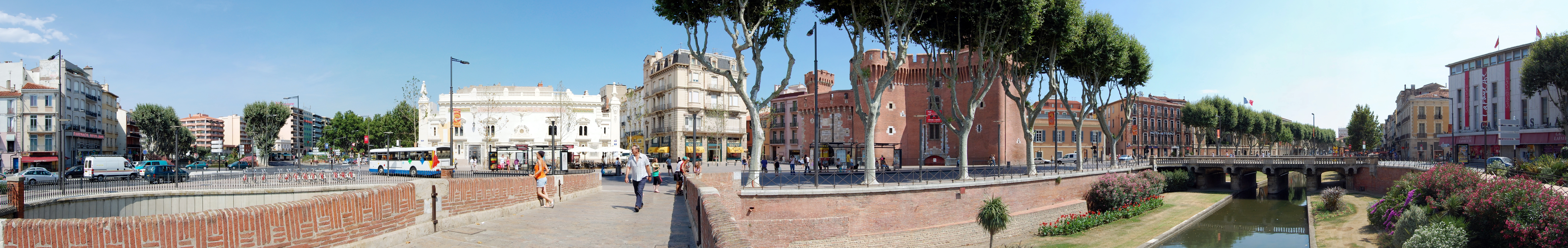
Sadi Carnot and Vauban walkways and the river Bassa

== Notable people linked to Perpignan ==
- Paul Alday (c.1763–1835), violinist, composer, and music publisher
- Christian Andreu (born 1976), guitarist
- Anna Maria Antigó (1602–1676), abbess
- François Arago (1786–1853), physicist, astronomer, and liberal politician
- Alexandre Artus (1821–1911), composer and conductor
- Amédée Artus (1815–1892), composer and conductor
- Frédérick Bousquet (born 1981), freestyle and butterfly swimmer
- Robert Brasillach (1909–1945), fascist author and journalist
- François Calvet (born 1953), politician
- Eugène Collache (1847–1883), French Navy officer who fought in Japan
- Mary Elmes (1908–2002), Irish aid worker
- Jean-Luc Escayol (born 1972), footballer
- François de Fossa (1775–1849), classical guitarist and composer
- Jacques-François Gallay (1795–1864), French horn player and composer
- Philippe Georget (born 1962), novelist
- Louise Labé (1524–1566), Lyons poet of the Renaissance
- Émile Labussière (1853–1924), politician (born in Perpignan)
- Aristide Maillol (1861–1944), sculptor and painter
- André Marty (1886–1956), communist leader
- Menachem Meiri (1249–c.1310), Catalan rabbi, Talmudist, and Maimonidean
- Isabelle Pasco (born 1966), actress
- Hyacinthe Rigaud (1659–1743), painter
- Kader Nouni (1976-), professional tennis umpire
- Myriam Ackermann-Sommer (born 1996), rabbi
- Frédéric Molas (born 1982), YouTube personality, video game tester, founder & co-host of the Web-show Joueur du Grenier
- Sébastien Rassiat (born 1982), YouTube personality, video game tester, founder & co-host of the Web-show Joueur du Grenier

Following a visit in 1963, the Catalan surrealist artist Salvador Dalí declared the city's railway station the centre of the Universe, claiming that he always had his best ideas sitting in its waiting room. Dalí's painting La Gare de Perpignan commemorates his vision of "cosmogonic ecstasy" there on 19 September 1963. He followed that up some years later by declaring that the Iberian Peninsula rotated precisely at Perpignan station 132 million years ago – an event the artist invoked in his 1983 painting Topological Abduction of Europe – Homage to René Thom. Above the station is a monument in Dali's honour, and across the surface of one of the main platforms is painted, in large letters, «perpignan centre du monde» (French for "perpignan centre of the world").

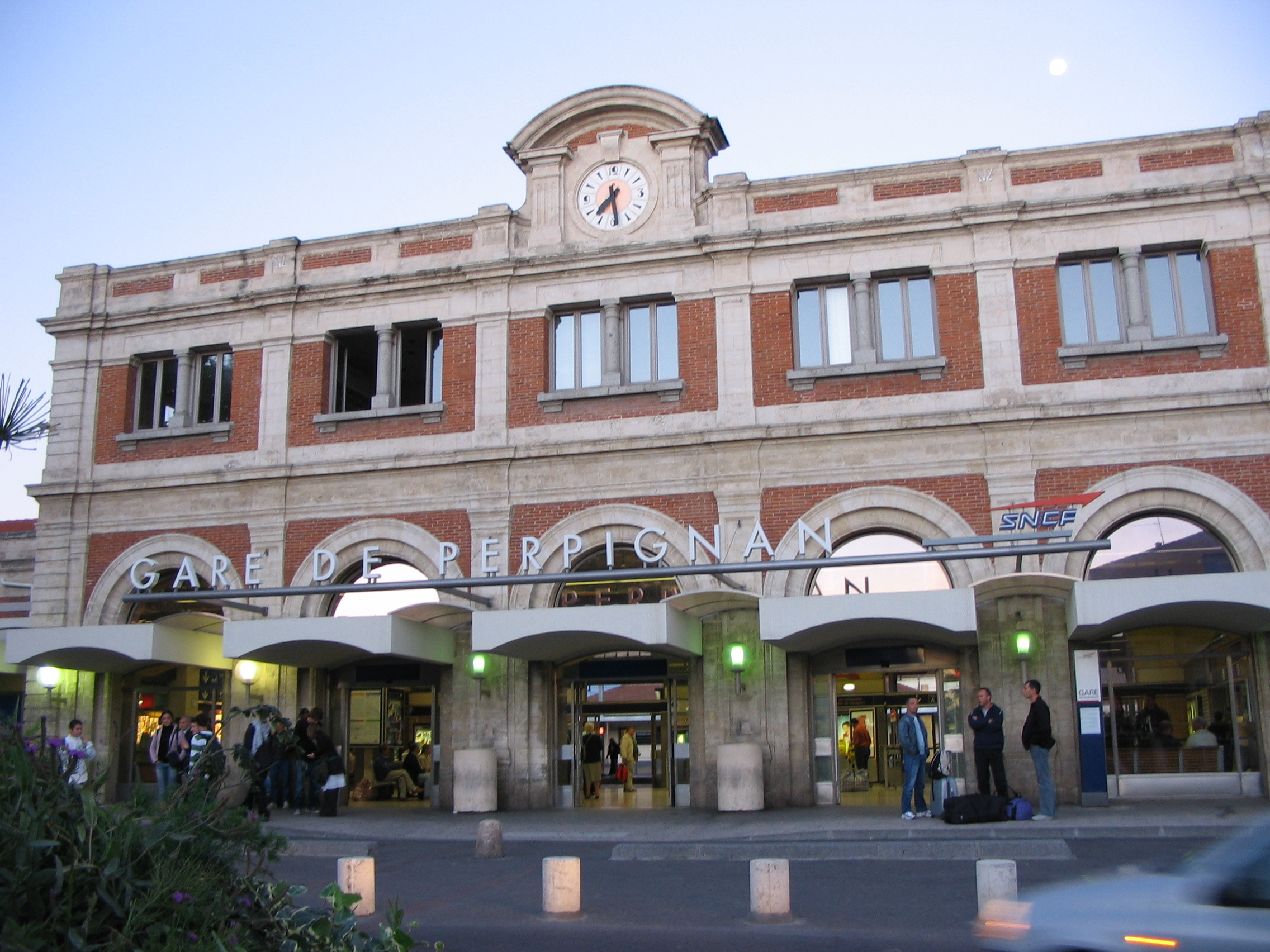
Perpignan train station

== Gallery ==
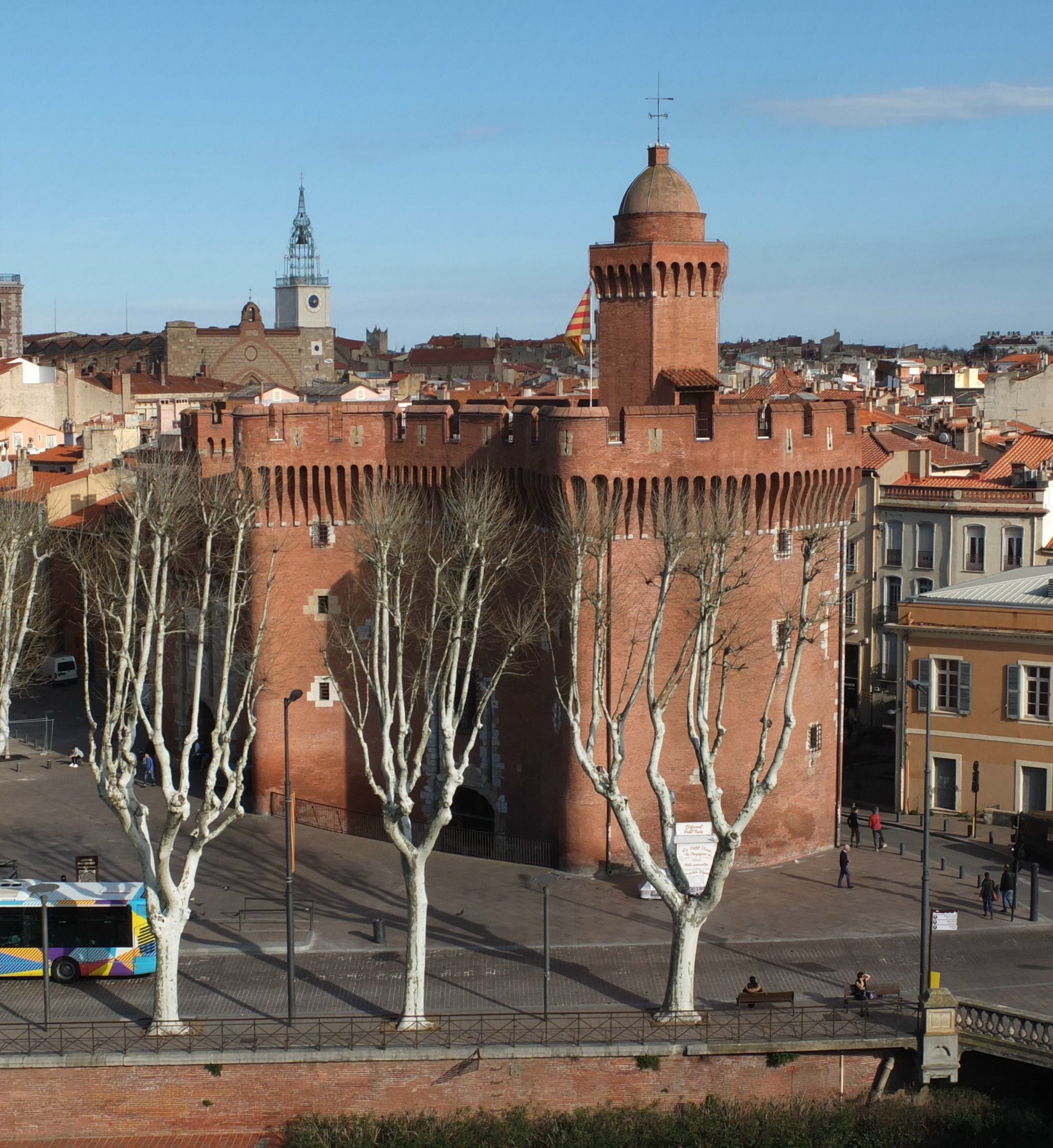
Le Castillet

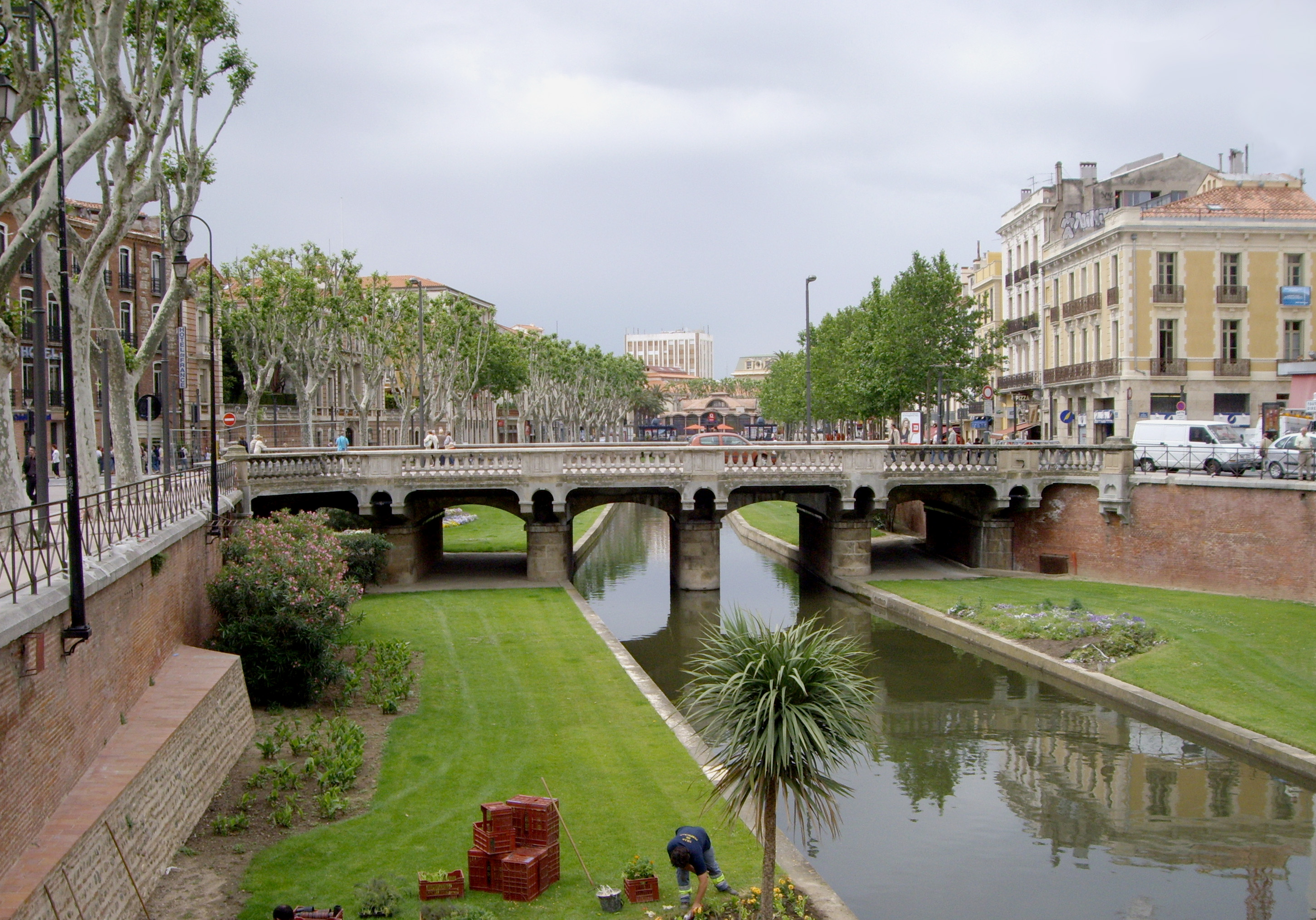
Bridge over the Basse

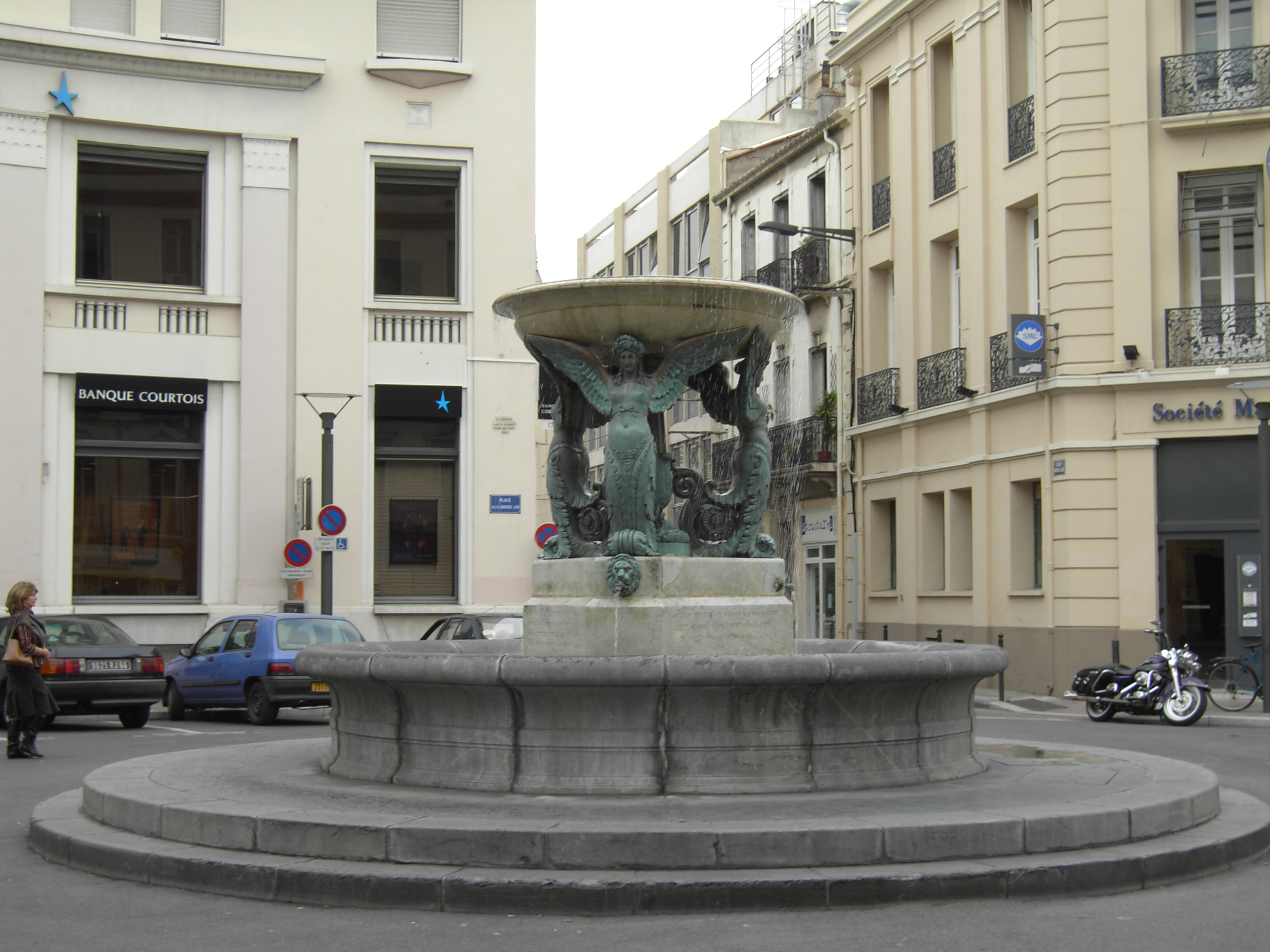
Mermaids fountain

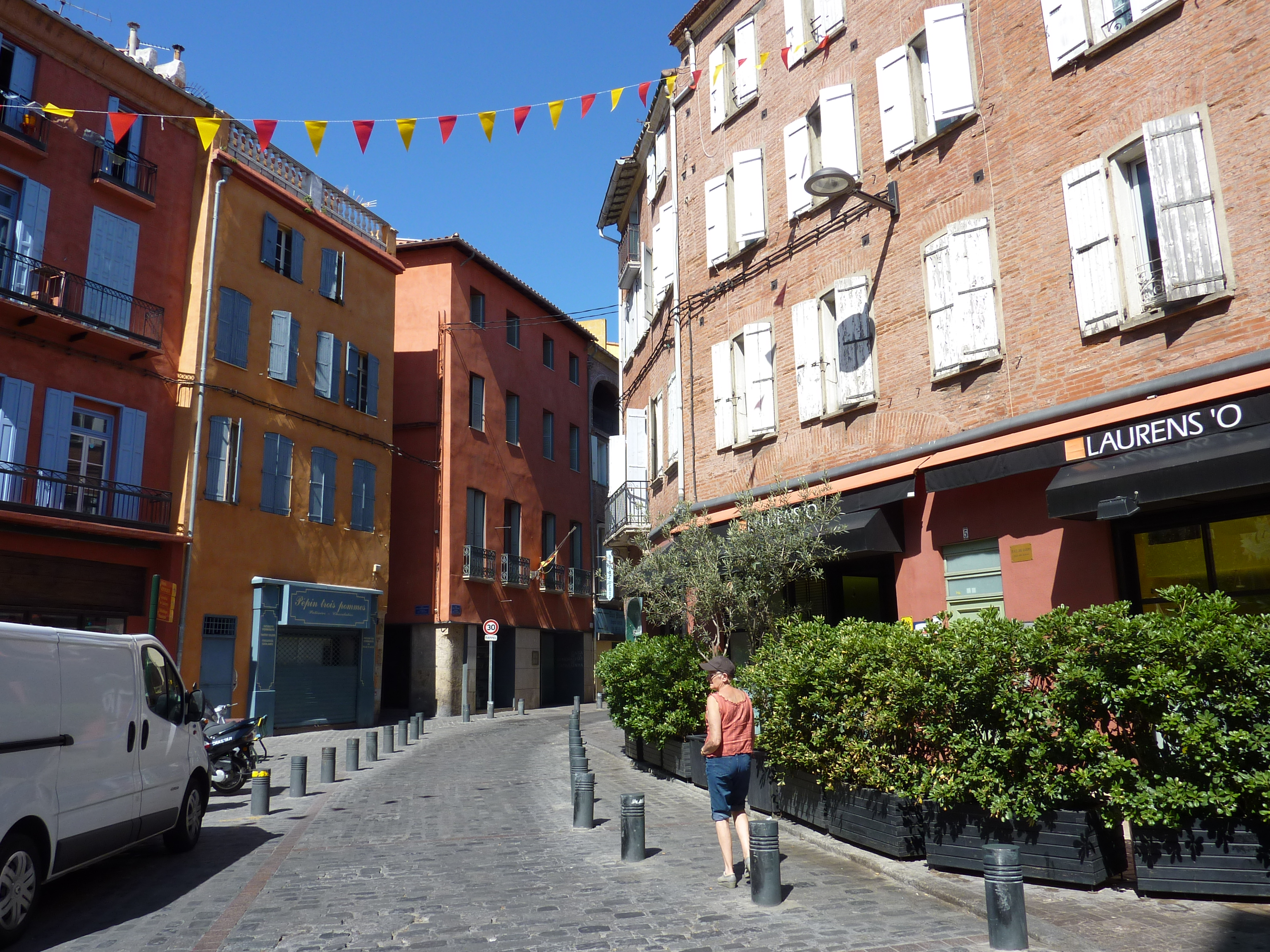
City centre

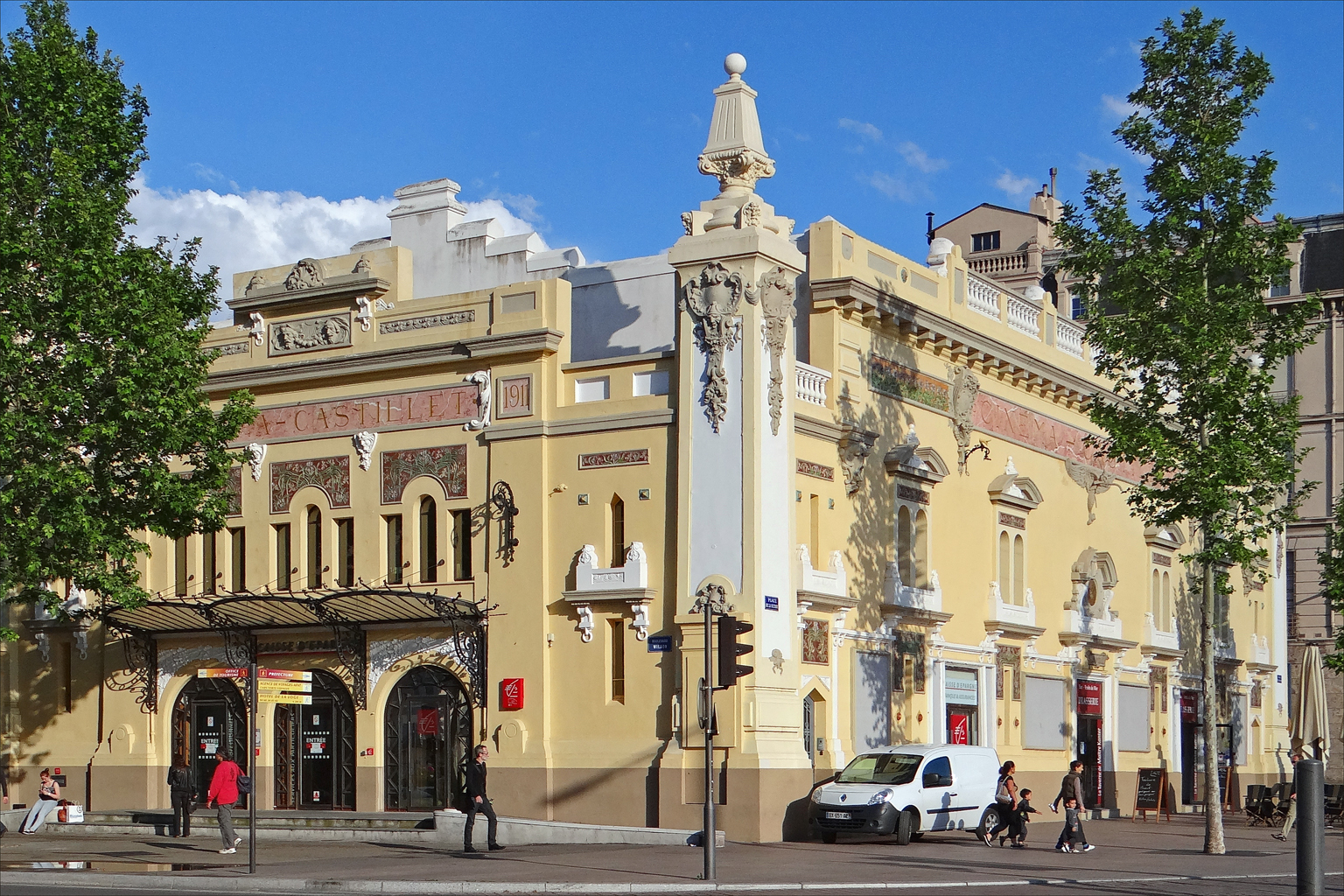
Cinéma Le Castillet

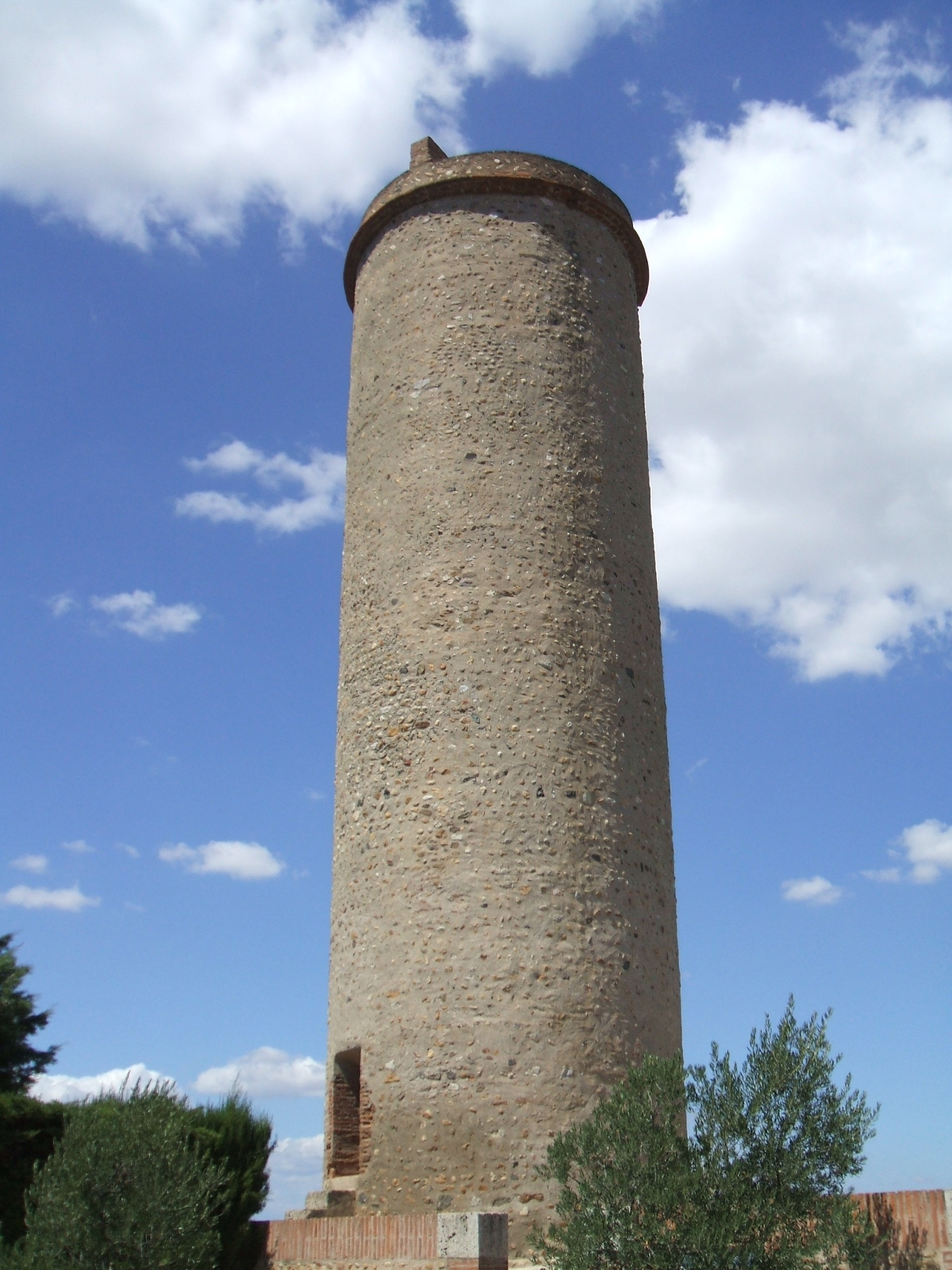
Château Roussillon: tower of the old castle (13th and 14th centuries)

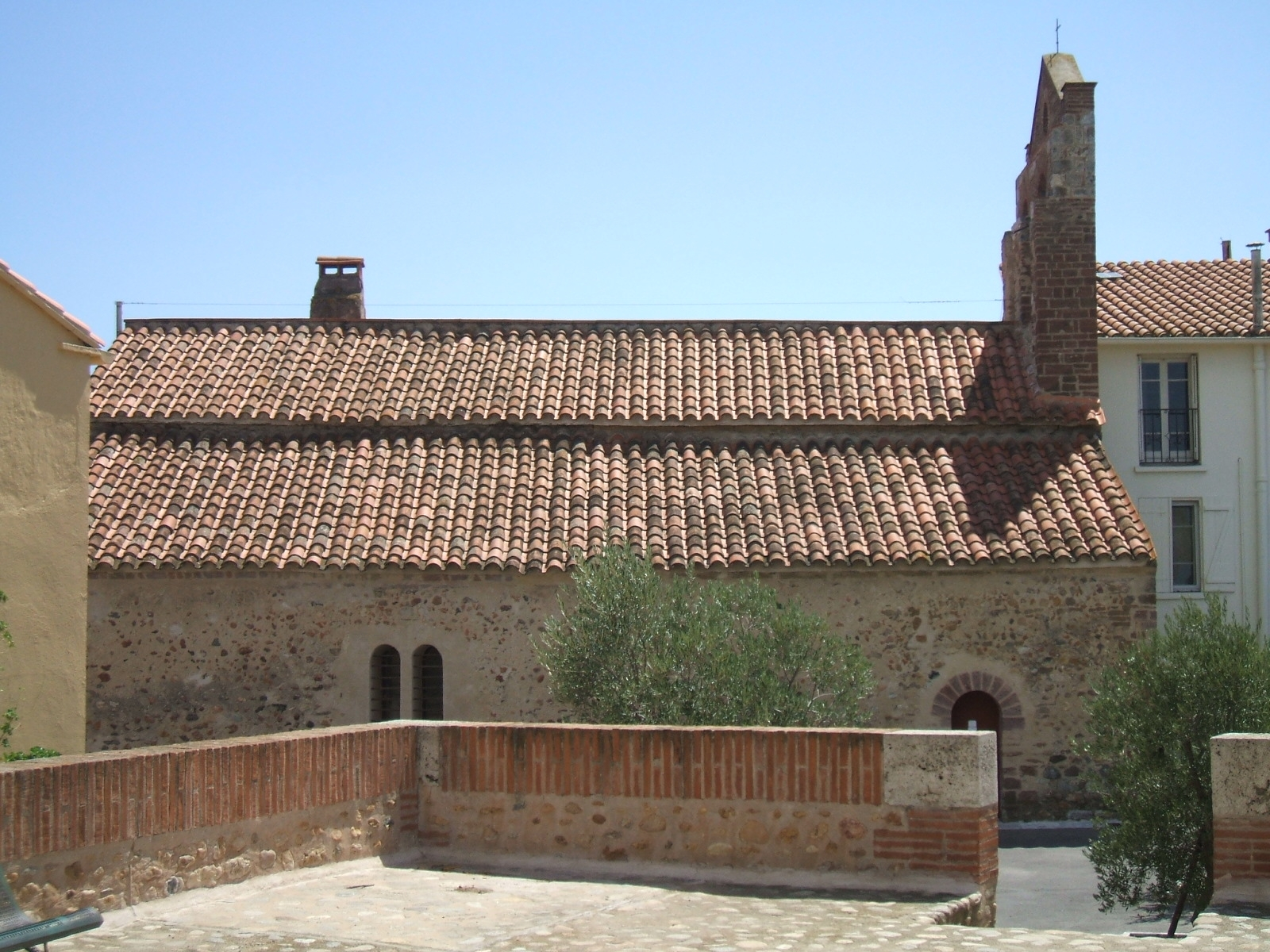
Château Roussillon: Sainte-Marie and Saint-Pierre chapel (11th and 12th centuries)

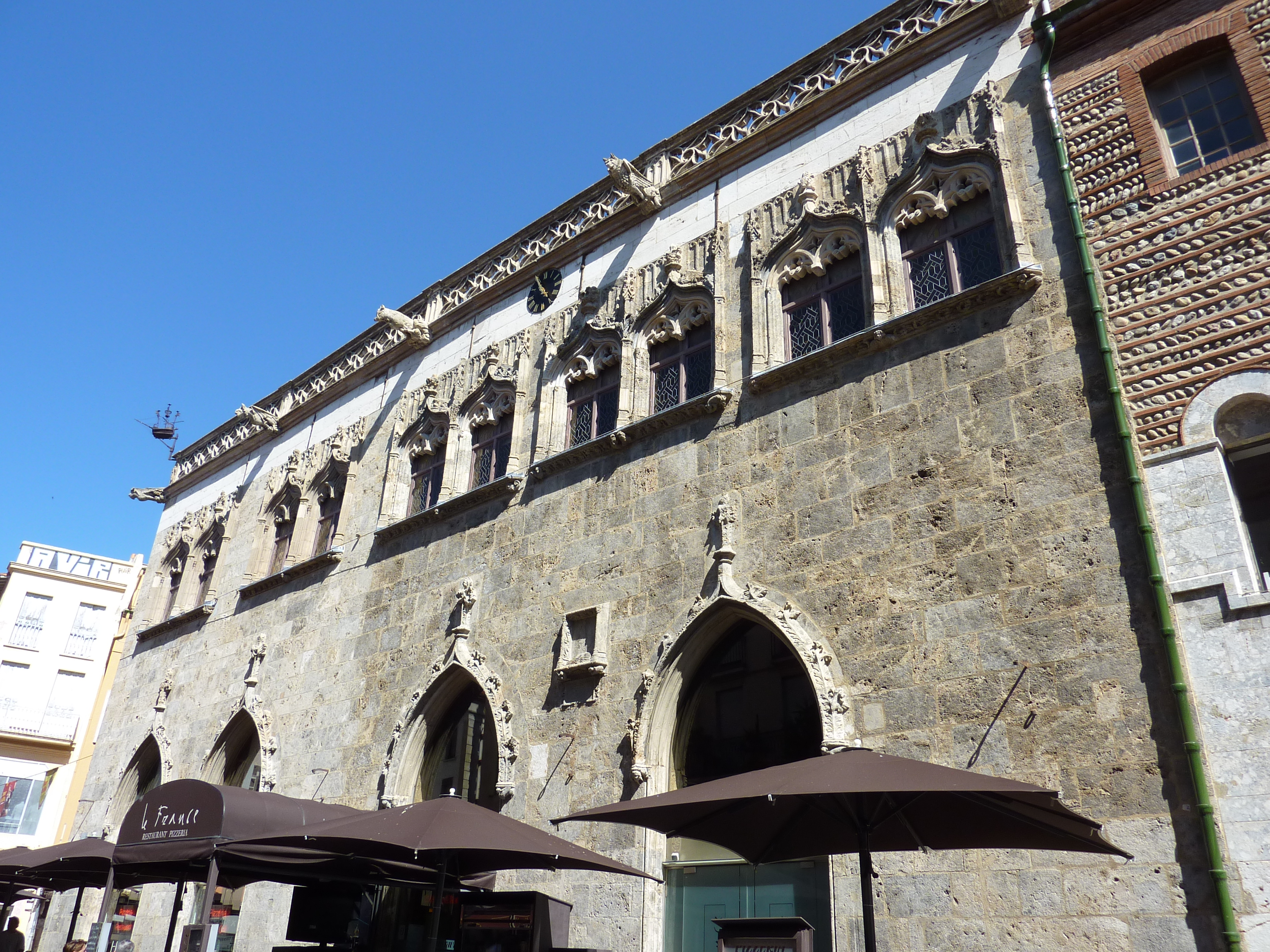

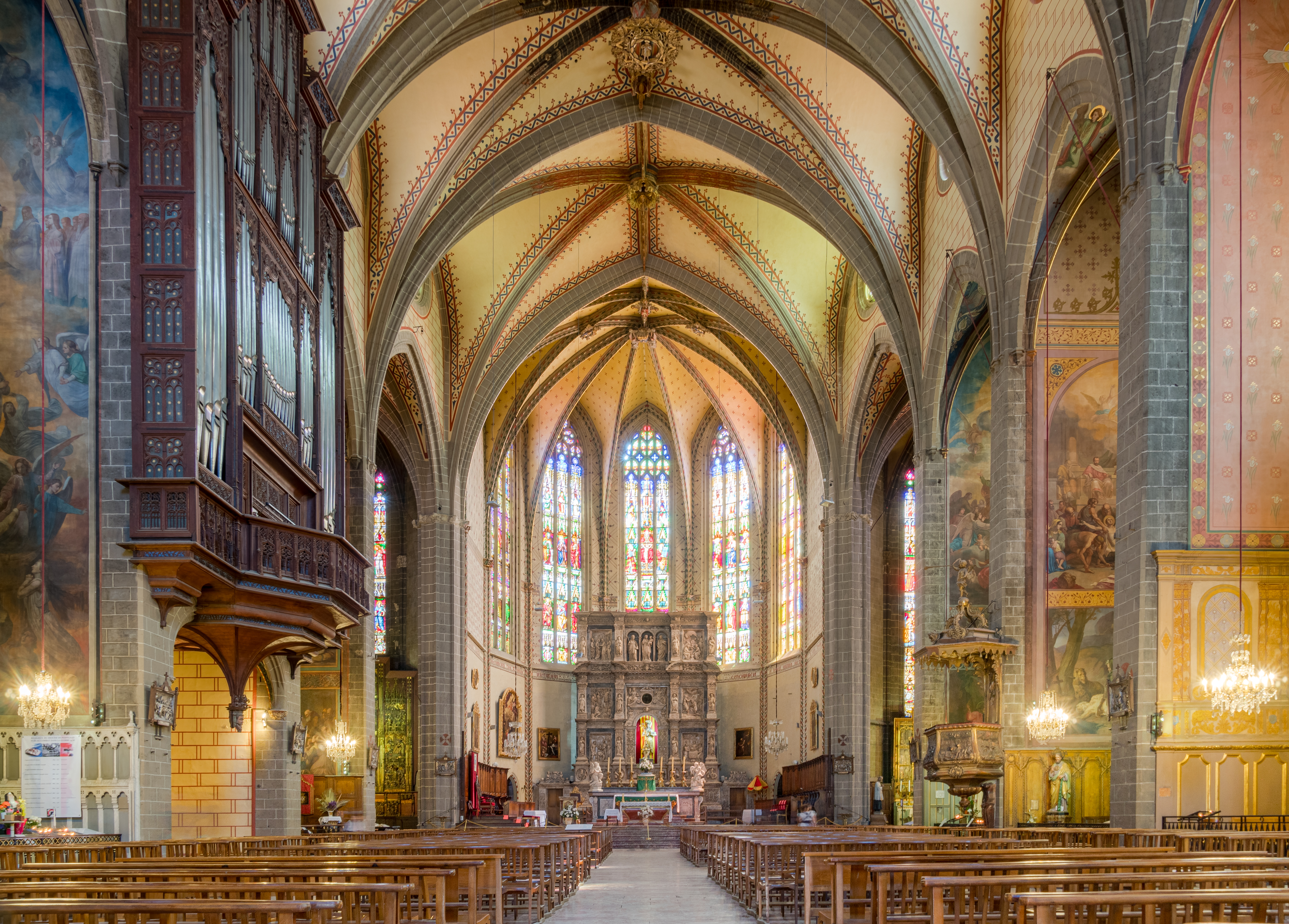
Cathédrale Saint-Jean

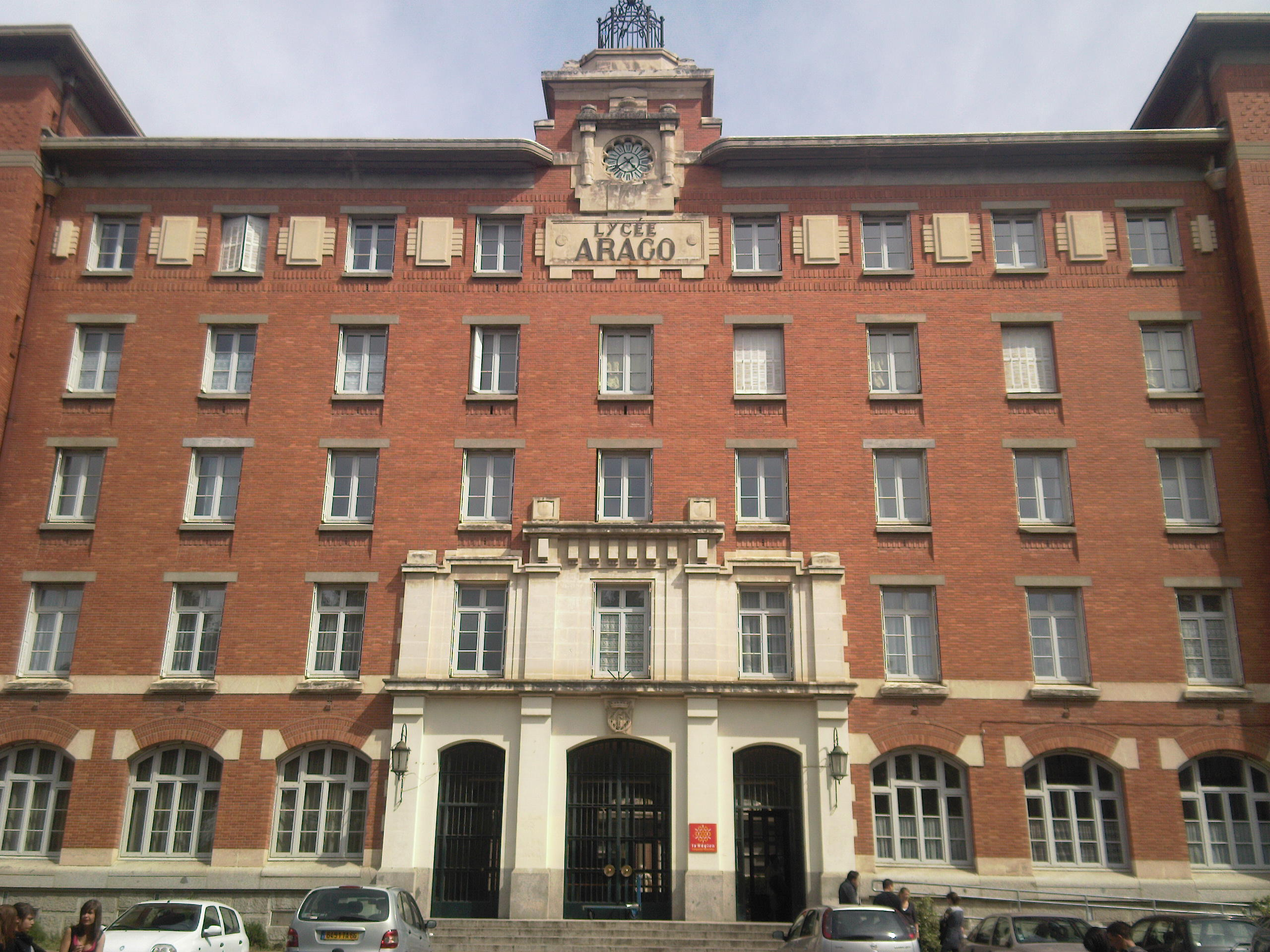
François Arago Lyceum

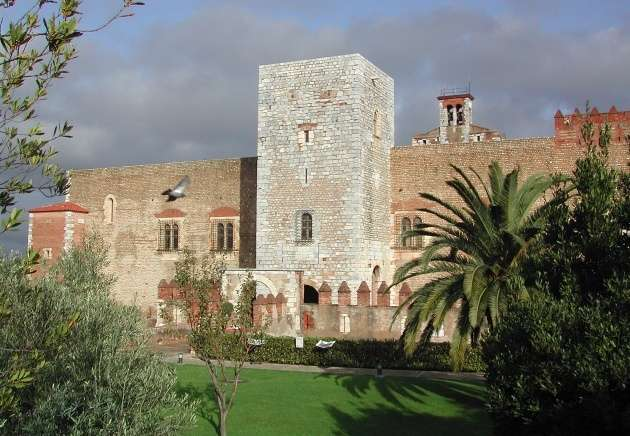
Palace of the Kings of Mallorca

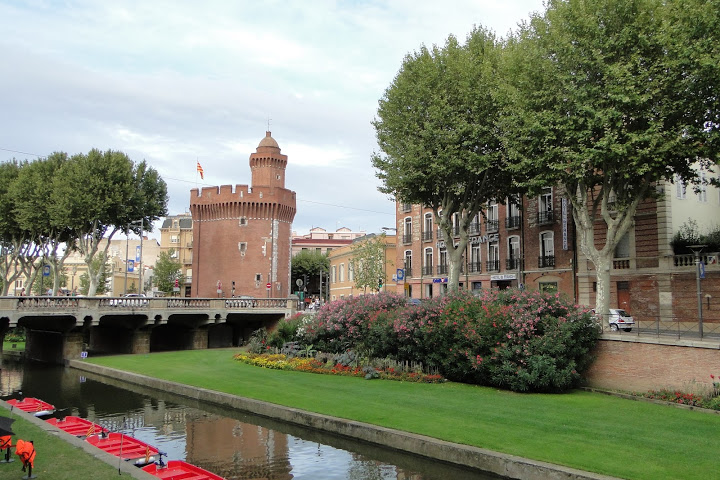
The bridge

== See also ==
- Communes of the Pyrénées-Orientales department
- Gare de Perpignan murders

== Bibliography ==
- Pigaillem, Henri (2008). Anne de Bretagne epouse de Charles VIII et de Louis XII. Pygmalion.
- Alícia Marcet, Histoire de Perpignan, la fidelíssima (1995), Perpinyà [Perpignan] : Llibres del Trabucaire, ISBN 9782905828613
