= Canton of Perpignan-4 =

Coordinates: 42.69°N 2.90°E

The Canton of Perpignan-4 is a French canton of Pyrénées-Orientales department, in Occitanie. It covers the central and southern part of the commune of Perpignan. At the French canton reorganisation which came into effect in March 2015, the canton was enlarged.

== Composition ==
Before 2015, the canton included the following neighbourhoods of Perpignan:

- La Lunette
- Moulin à Vent
- University
- Porte d'Espagne
- Mas Palégry
