= Canton of Perpignan-5 =

Coordinates: 42.69°N 2.89°E

The Canton of Perpignan-5 is a French canton of Pyrénées-Orientales department, in Occitanie.

== Composition ==
At the French canton reorganisation which came into effect in March 2015, the canton was expanded from 1 to 2 communes:

- Canohès
- Perpignan (southwestern part)

Before 2015, the canton included only the following neighbourhoods of Perpignan:

- Saint-Martin
- Mailloles
- Catalunya
- Pascot
- Mas-Bresson
