= Canton of Perpignan-1 =

Coordinates: 42.71°N 2.89°E

The Canton of Perpignan-1 is a French canton of Pyrénées-Orientales department, in Occitanie. It covers the northern part of the commune of Perpignan. At the French canton reorganisation which came into effect in March 2015, the canton was enlarged.

== Composition ==
Before 2015, the Perpignan 1st Canton included the following neighbourhoods of Perpignan:

- Polygone-Nord
- Haut-Vernet
- Moyen-Vernet
- Hospital
