= Canton of Perpignan-6 =

French canton

Coordinates: 42.70°N 2.89°E

The Canton of Perpignan-6 is a French canton of Pyrénées-Orientales department, in Occitanie.

== Composition ==
At the French canton reorganisation which came into effect in March 2015, the canton was expanded from 1 to 2 communes:

- Perpignan (western part)
- Toulouges

Before 2015, the canton included only the following neighbourhoods of Perpignan:

- West downtown
- Les Remparts
- Saint-Mathieu/La Réal
- Clémenceau
