= Canton of Elne =

Coordinates: 42.6000°N 2.9667°E

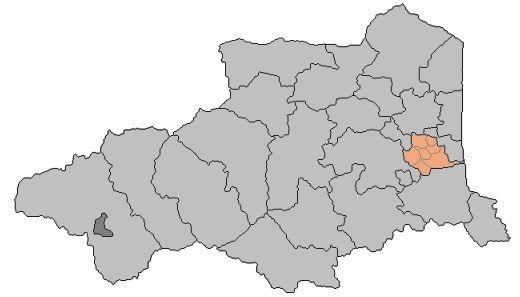
Location of the canton in Pyrénées-Orientales

The Canton of Elne is a former French canton of Pyrénées-Orientales department, in Languedoc-Roussillon. It had 22,823 inhabitants (2012). It was disbanded in 2015.

== Composition ==
The canton of Elne comprised 7 communes:

- Elne
- Bages
- Corneilla-del-Vercol
- Montescot
- Ortaffa
- Théza
- Villeneuve-de-la-Raho
