= Alénya =

Alénya Alenyà (Catalan)
- Commune
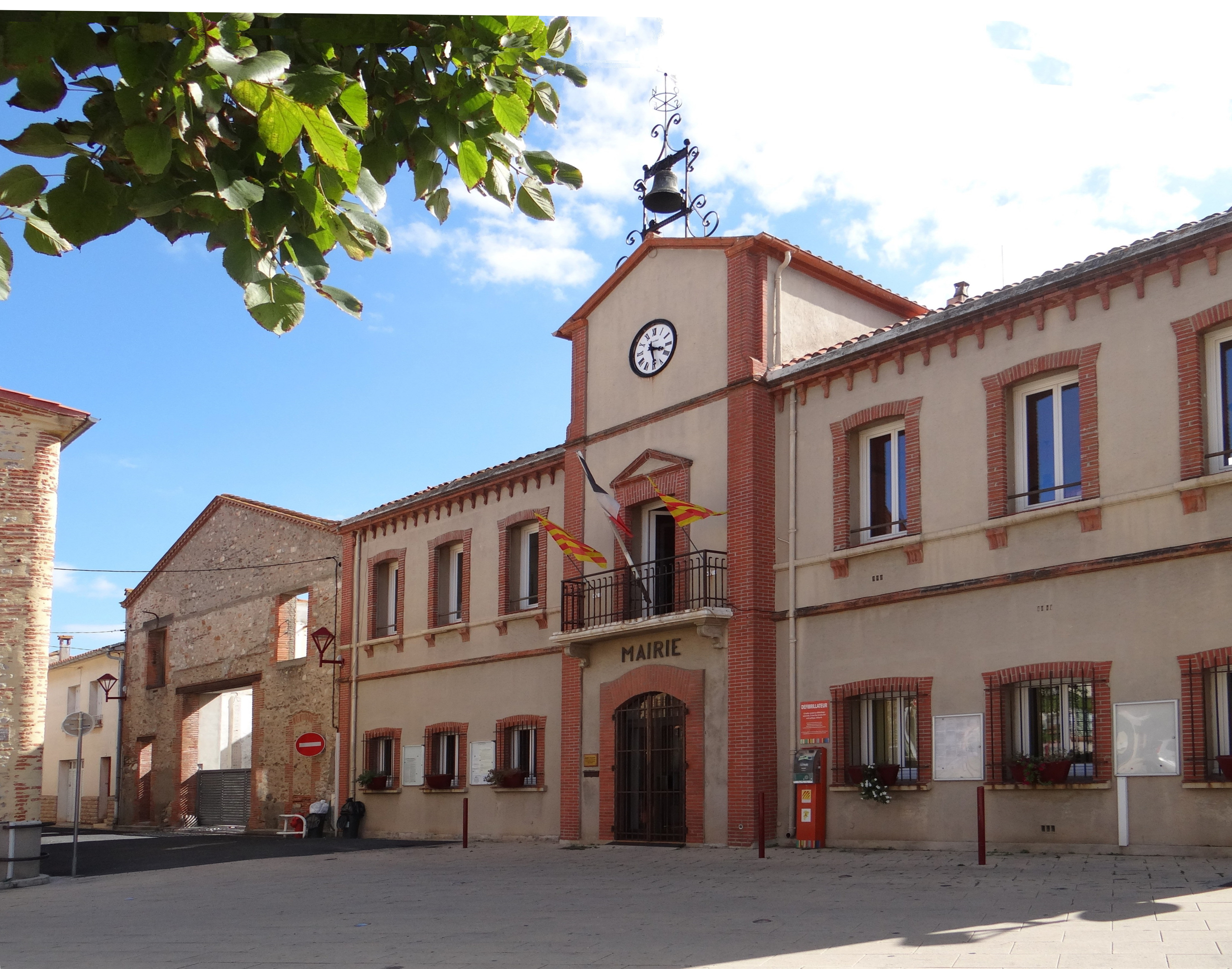
- The town hall in Alénya

- Coat of arms
- Location of Alénya
- Location within France Location within Occitanie
- Coordinates: 42°38′27″N 2°58′57″E
- Country: France
- Region: Occitania
- Department: Pyrénées-Orientales
- Arrondissement: Céret
- Canton: La Plaine d'Illibéris
- Intercommunality: Sud Roussillon

Government
  - Mayor (2026–32): Jean-André Magdalou
- Area^{1}: 5.34 km^{2} (2.06 sq mi)
- Elevation: 5 m (16 ft)
- Highest elevation: 18 m (59 ft)
- Lowest elevation: 3 m (9.8 ft)
- Population (2023): 3,782
  - Density: 708/km^{2} (1,830/sq mi)
- Demonym(s): alényanais (fr) alenyanenc (ca)
- Time zone: UTC+01:00 (CET)
  - Summer (DST): UTC+02:00 (CEST)
- INSEE/Postal code: 66002 /66200
- ^{1} French Land Register data, which excludes lakes, ponds, glaciers > 1 km^{2} (0.386 sq mi or 247 acres) and river estuaries.

Alénya (French pronunciation: [aleɲa]; Catalan: Alenyà [əɫəˈɲa]) is a commune in the Pyrénées-Orientales department in southern France.

The village is surrounded by wine fields. Apricot and peach are also grown here.

== Geography ==
=== Localisation ===
Alénya covers an area of 5.34 km^{2} (2.06 sq mi), with 434 inhabitants per km^{2}. It is located about 10 km (6.2 mi) from Perpignan and borders the municipalities of Saint-Nazaire, Canet-en-Roussillon, Saint-Cyprien, Elne, Corneilla del Vercol, Théza, and Saleilles. Alénya has a Mediterranean climate.

Alénya is located in the canton of La Plaine d'Illibéris and in the arrondissement of Perpignan. It is part of the Northern Catalan comarca of Rosselló.

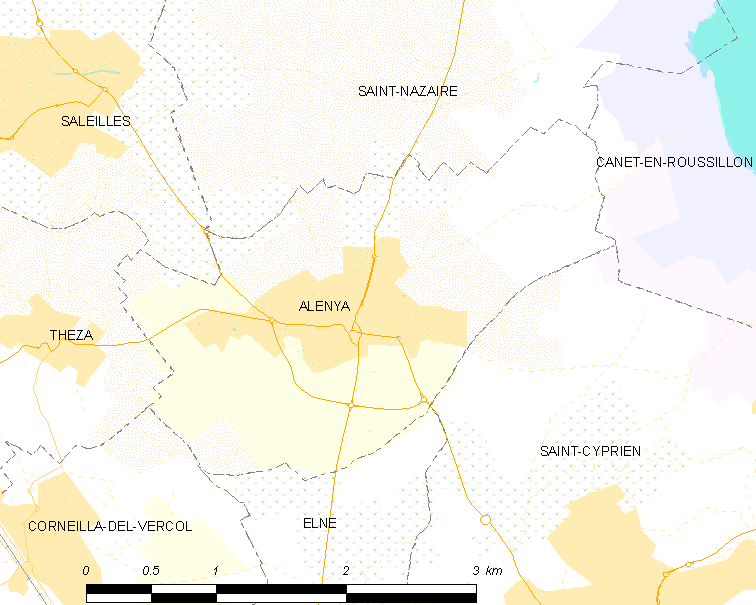
Map of Alénya and its surrounding communes

== History ==
Alénya was first inhabited by the Celts and was conquered by the Romans in c. 121 BC. It was first mentioned in 904 in a document mentioning towns on the Elne.

Before 1214 Alénya was only a small hamlet with little importance. That was the year its first church was built. A second church which still stands today was built in 1593. Among its attractions is a statue of the Virgin Mary from the fifteenth century.

== Government and politics ==
=== Canton ===
In 1790, the commune of Alénya is included into the canton of Elne, then part of the Perpignan district. It is moved to the canton of East-Perpignan in 1801, before being included into the canton of Perpignan-3 in 1973 and, finally, into the canton of La Côte Radieuse in 1982. Following the French canton reorganisation which came into effect in March 2015, Alénya is now part of the canton of La Plaine d'Illibéris.

=== Mayors ===
Mayor	Term start	Term end
Simone Parrot	1965	1983
Jacques Pumareda	2001	2014
Jean-André Magdalou	2014	Present

== Population ==
The people of Alénya are called Alényanais in French.

Historical population
Year	Pop.	±% p.a.
1968	678	—
1975	1,006	+5.80%
1982	1,211	+2.68%
1990	1,562	+3.23%
1999	2,318	+4.48%
2007	2,846	+2.60%
2012	3,283	+2.90%
2017	3,601	+1.87%
2023	3,782	+0.82%
Source: INSEE

== Sites of interest ==
- The Sainte-Eulalie-et-Sainte-Julie church, built from 1593.
- The Ortaffa medieval house.
- The Pedra Martina, a medieval boundary stone.
- The Pompe Bonne, an old fountain.
- The former castle and Saint-Martin church of Boaça, both medieval and once located to the west of Alénya, were destroyed in 1974 to build a summer camp.

== See also ==
- Communes of the Pyrénées-Orientales department
