= Canton of La Plaine d'Illibéris =

Coordinates: 42.6000°N 2.9667°E

The Canton of La Plaine d'Illibéris is a French canton of Pyrénées-Orientales department, in Occitanie. At the French canton reorganisation which came into effect in March 2015, the canton of La Plaine d'Illibéris was created including 5 communes from the canton of Elne and 2 from the canton of La Côte Radieuse.

== Composition ==
- Alénya
- Bages
- Corneilla-del-Vercol
- Elne
- Latour-Bas-Elne
- Montescot
- Ortaffa
- Théza
- Villeneuve-de-la-Raho
