= Canton of La Côte Radieuse =

Former French canton

Coordinates: 42.6423°N 2.9711°E

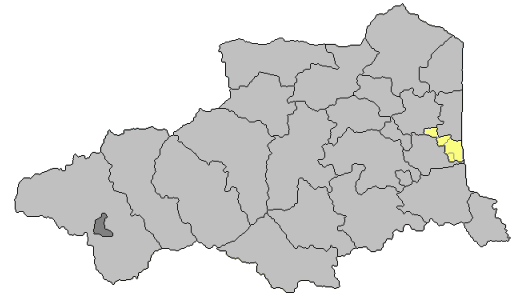
Location of the canton in Pyrénées-Orientales

The Canton of La Côte Radieuse is a French former canton of Pyrénées-Orientales department, in Languedoc-Roussillon. It was created 25 January 1982 by the decree 82–84. It had 20,738 inhabitants (2012). It was disbanded following the French canton reorganisation which came into effect in March 2015.

== Composition ==
The canton of La Côte Radieuse comprised 4 communes:

- Saint-Cyprien
- Alénya
- Latour-Bas-Elne
- Saleilles
