= Étienne Terrus =

French painter (1857–1922)

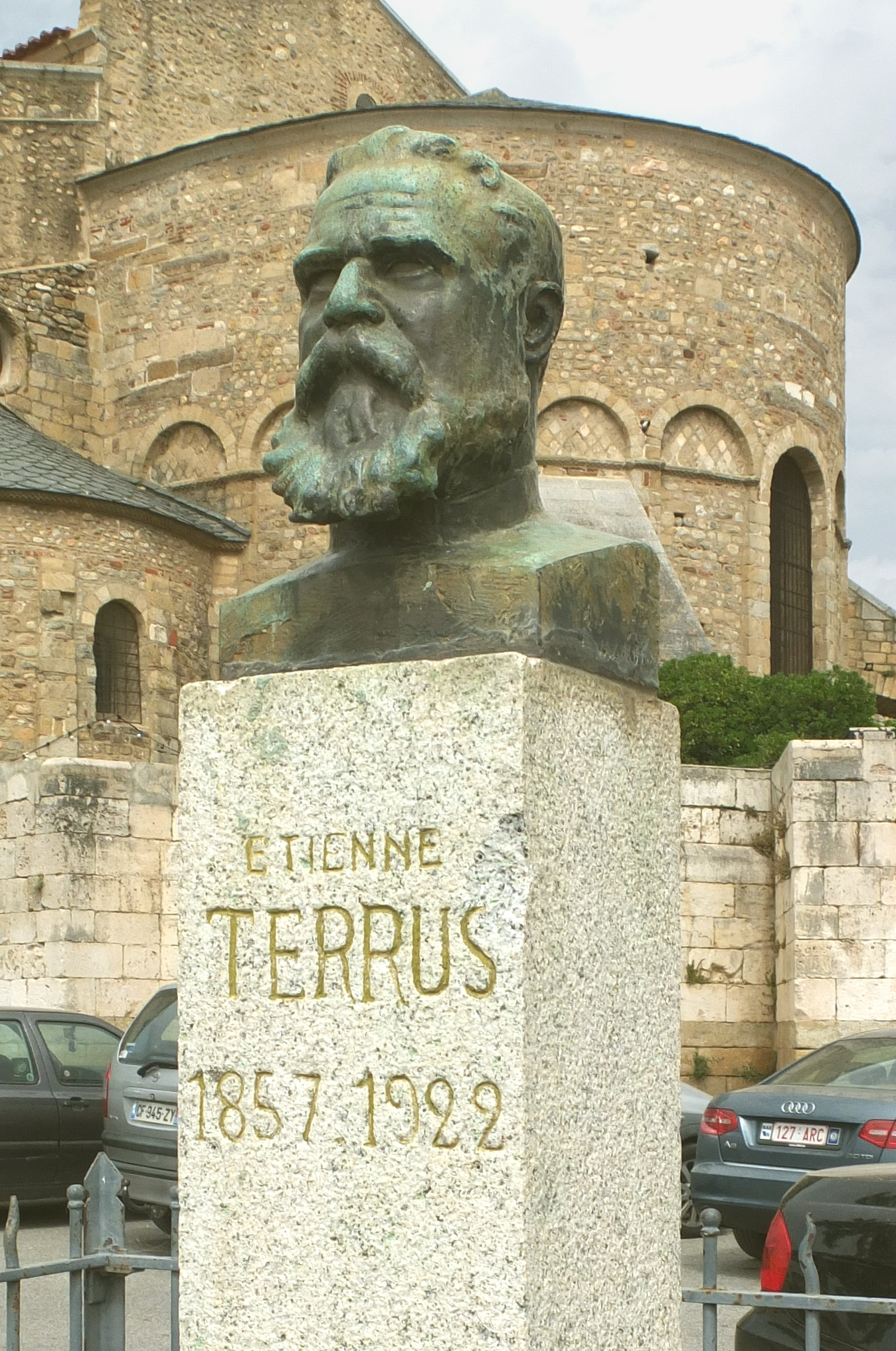
Bust of Étienne Terrus by Aristide Maillol, Elne

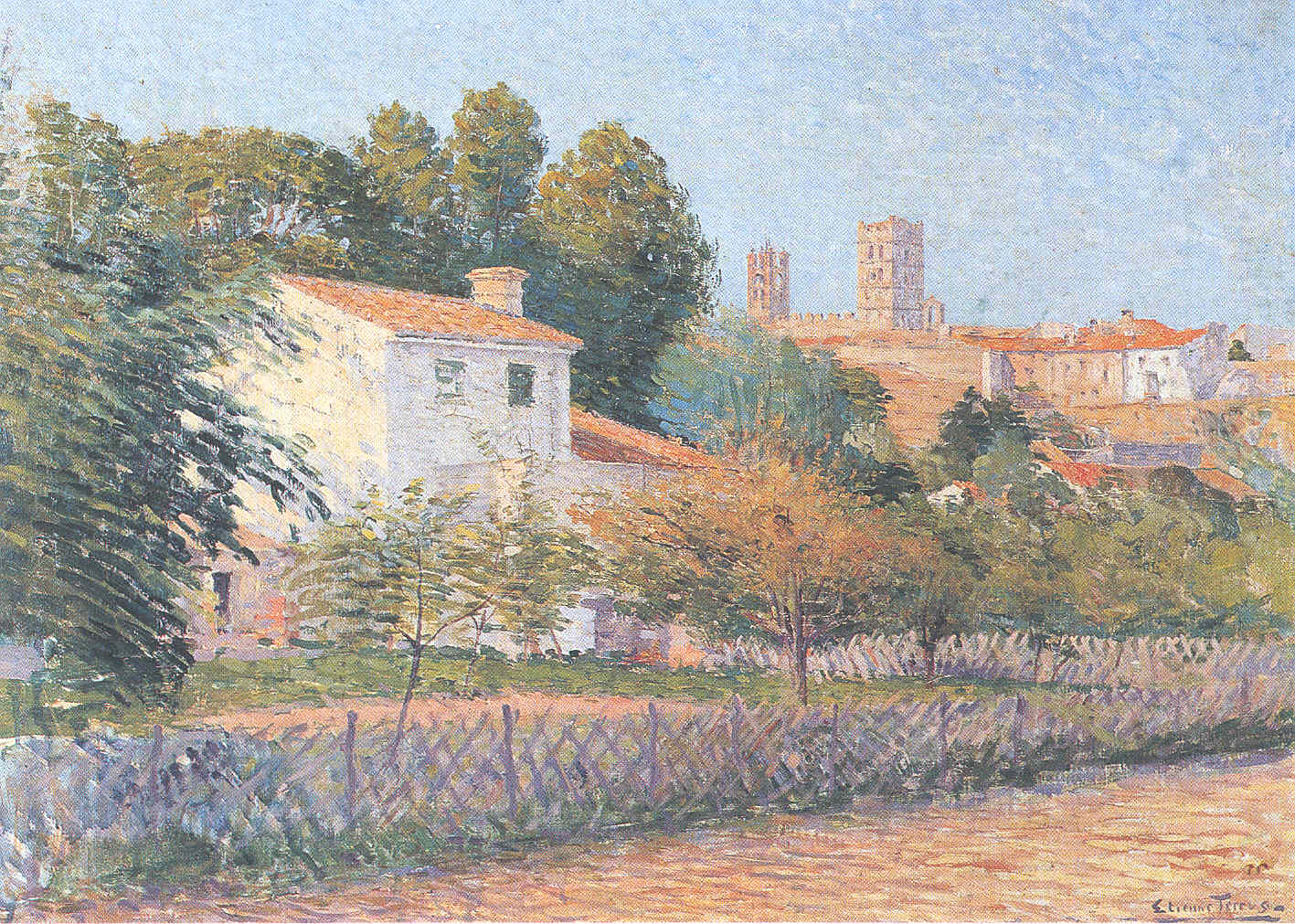
Vue d'Elne par Étienne Terrus (v. 1900)

Étienne Joseph Mathieu Terrus (22 September 1857 in Elne, Pyrénées-Orientales – 22 June 1922 in Elne) was a French painter from Roussillon.

When he was 17 years old, he went to Paris to study but soon after, he went back to Elne, where he produced most of his works.

He used to walk with his easel and he is considered one of the precursors of Fauvism. During his life, he was very much appreciated by artists like George-Daniel de Monfreid, André Derain, and Henri Matisse, who was his penpal from 1905 to 1917.

In 1994, a museum about him was inaugurated in his birth town, and, in 1998, his works were shown in the exhibition "Le Roussillon à l'origine de l'Art Moderne" in Perpignan.

The Terrus Museum in Elne in the south of France is dedicated to paintings by Terrus. In 2018, it was discovered that more than half its collection, 82 works, were counterfeit. It was thought that works by other regional artists in other locations might also be counterfeit.

== Bibliography ==
- Madeleine Raynal, « Étienne Terrus », Conflent, n° 181, janvier-février 1993, p. 2–6.
