= Perpignan Cathedral =

Cathedral in Perpignan, France

Coordinates: 42°42′2″N 2°53′49″E

Perpignan Cathedral Cathedral Basilica of Saint John the Baptist
- Basilique-Cathédrale de Saint-Jean-Baptiste
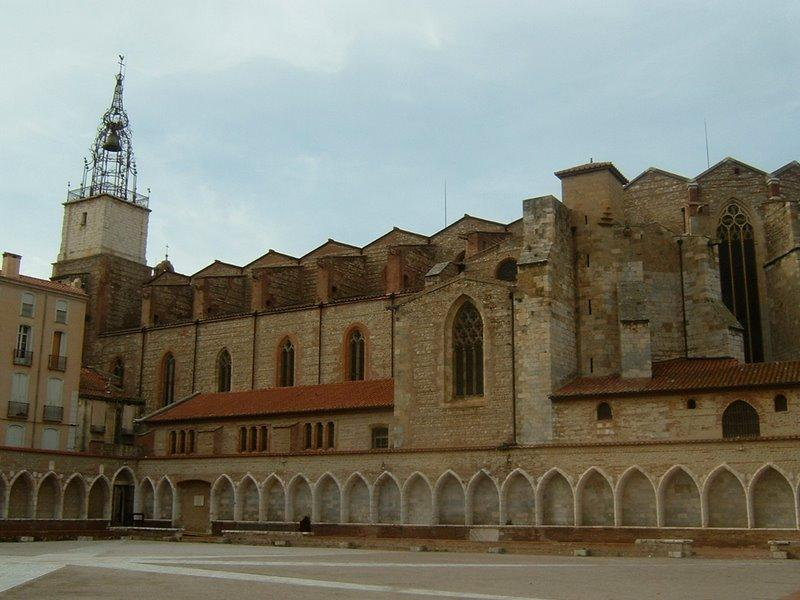

Religion
- Affiliation: Roman Catholic Church

Location
- Location: Perpignan, France
- Interactive map of Perpignan Cathedral; Cathedral Basilica of Saint John the Baptist

Architecture
- Type: church
- Style: Gothic
- Direction of façade: West

Perpignan Cathedral (French: Basilique-Cathédrale de Saint-Jean-Baptiste de Perpignan; Catalan: Catedral de Sant Joan Baptista de Perpinyà) is a Catholic cathedral, and a French monument historique, located in the town of Perpignan in Languedoc-Roussillon. It is dedicated to Saint John the Baptist. It was granted the status of a minor basilica in 1875.,

Construction of the cathedral was begun in 1324 by King Sancho of Majorca, and finished in the 15th century. It replaced the cathedral of Elna, and therefore was at first the seat of the Bishop of Elne, and then, from 1602, of the Bishop of Perpignan–Elne.

== Description ==
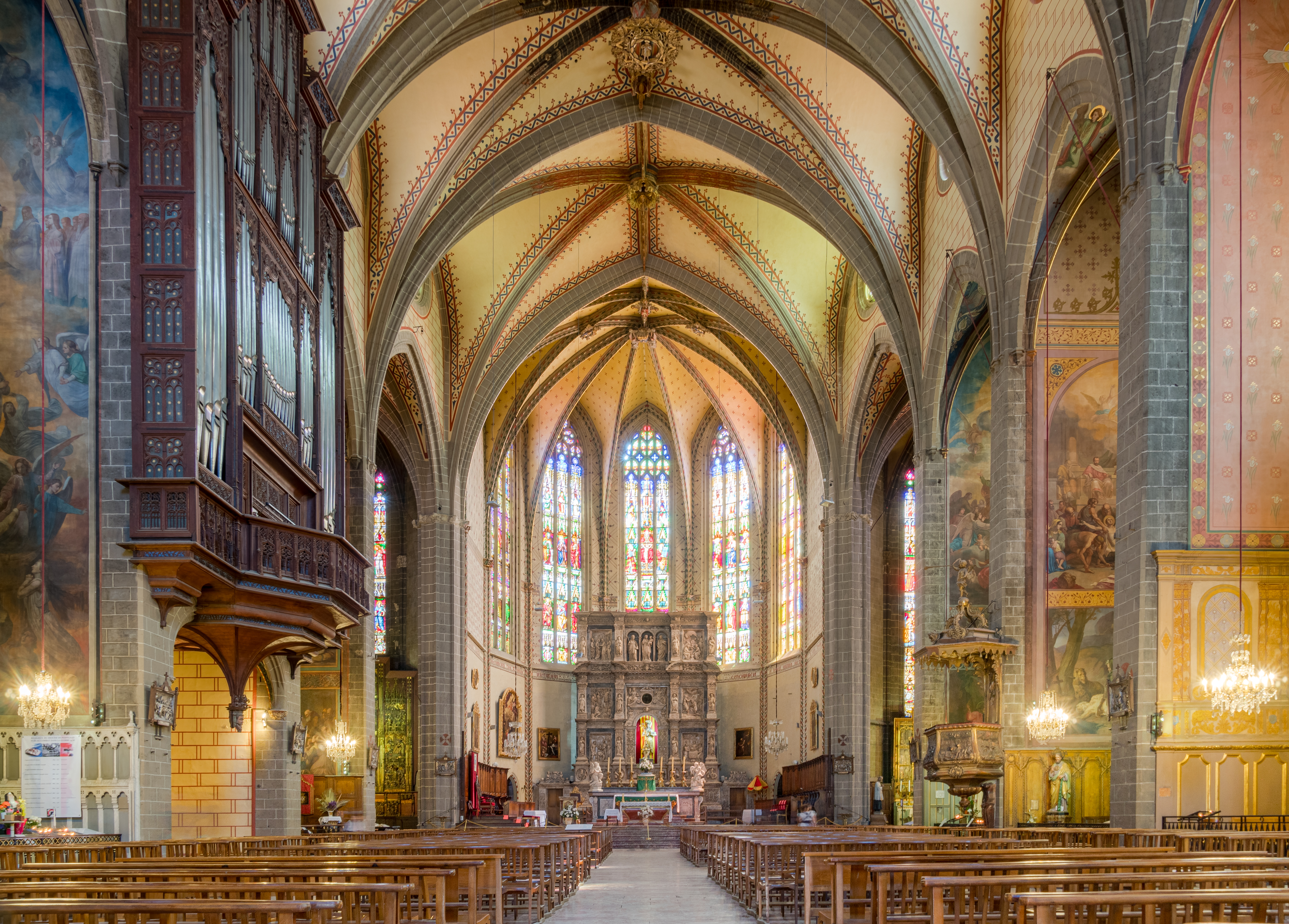
Interior

The cathedral was built in the Catalan Gothic style, because of its association with the Kingdom of Majorca. It has a wide nave (80 meters long, 18 m wide, and 26 m tall) made of seven cross-vaults, and features a short transept and apse, whose vault features seven keys.

The cathedral's western façade was never finished. When being restored in the 19th and 20th centuries, the Gothic window of the façade was rebuilt, as it had previously been substituted by a simple rectangular opening. The façade also features a portico and clock-tower, which date from the 18th century. In the 19th century tuning bells was re-invented. Perpignan has the first carillon with tuned bells, by Amédée Bollée and sons.

== Campo Santo ==
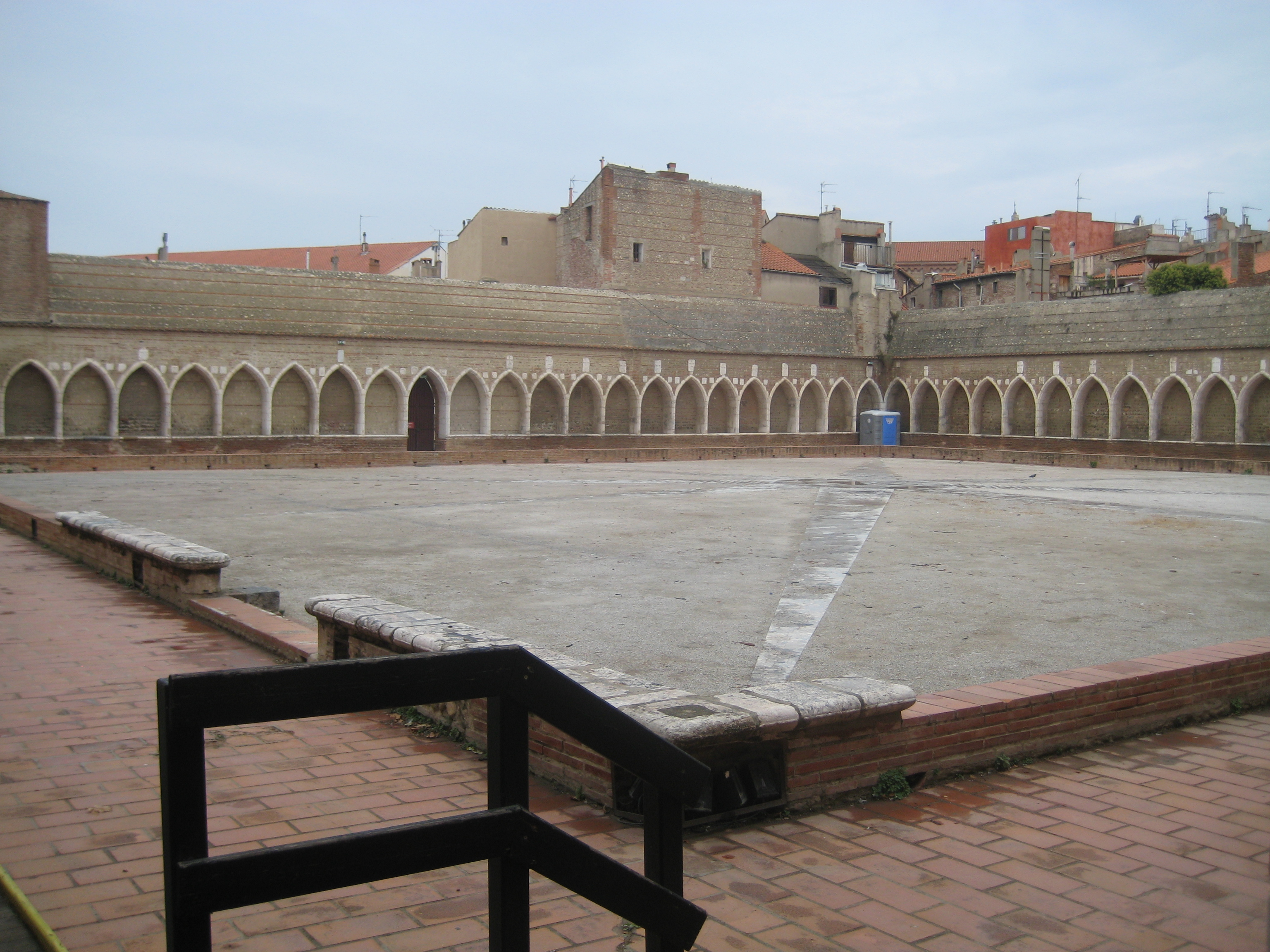
Campo Santo

The Campo Santo (or cloister of Saint-Jean), on the south side of the cathedral, was the urban cemetery of Perpignan. It is the oldest and largest medieval cemetery surviving in France. Its construction probably began as early as 1298, and in any case before 1302 (the date on the tombstone of the hebdomadary Guillem Jorda, "initiator of the work of the cloister"), and continued in the first half of the 14th century.

After the Revolution, cemeteries were moved out of cities. In 1825 the western gallery of the cloister was demolished to build a diocesan seminary which later became gendarmerie barracks. The cloister was restored in 1984–91. Today, only the north, east and south sides of the walls remain. In addition, five niche tombs on the west side have been restored. Numerous elements of sculptures (burial stones, low reliefs) can be seen in the niche tombs. A funerary chapel opens in the east side. The simple skylight galleries (wooden poles carrying the cover, with pillars at the corners), which surrounded the cloister disappeared at the beginning of the 19th century; during the restoration some elements from them were found and moved to the Convent of the Minimes in Perpignan for storage.
