= Lac de Villeneuve-de-la-Raho =

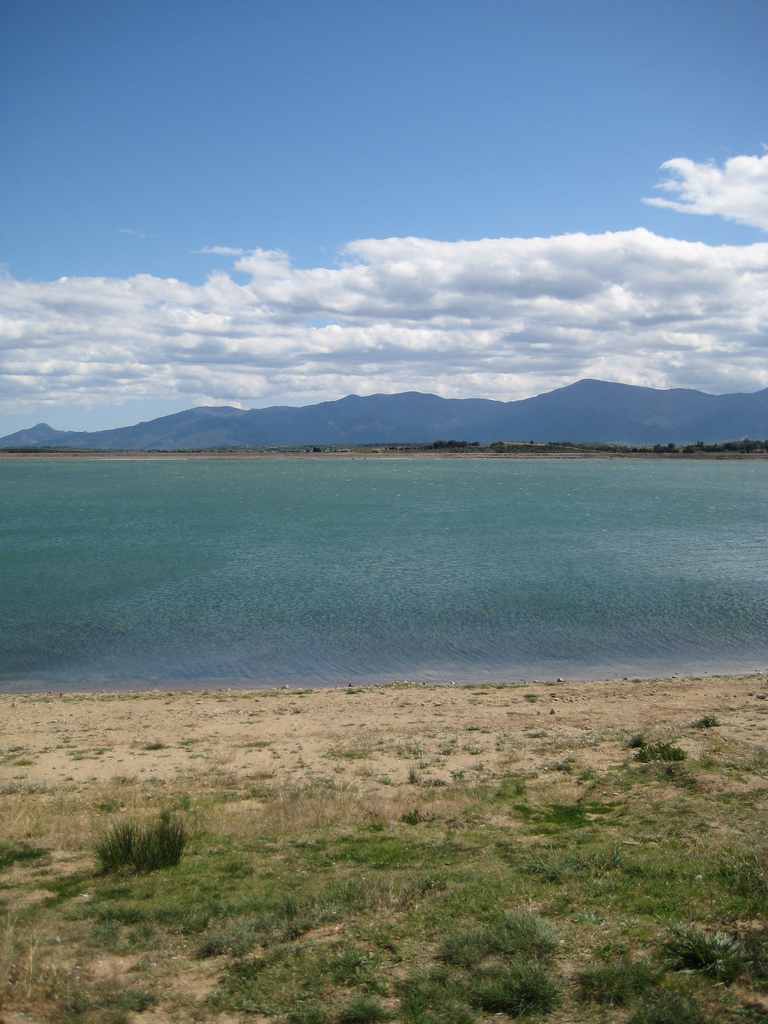

- Location within Pyrenees
- Location: Pyrénées-Orientales
- Coordinates: 42.630993°N 2.903633°E
- Lake type: reservoir
- Primary inflows: canal de Perpignan
- Basin countries: France
- Surface area: 2.01 km^{2} (0.78 sq mi)
- Max. depth: 14 m (46 ft)
- Water volume: 17.9×10^{6} m^{3} (630×10^{6} cu ft)
- Surface elevation: 150 m (490 ft)

Lac de Villeneuve-de-la-Raho is a lake in the town of Villeneuve-de-la-Raho in Pyrénées-Orientales, France.

The lake lies in a deflation pan. That is a natural, circular, shallow depression caused by the removal of fairly loose, mainly Pliocene, sediment by wind erosion, during very cold, windy phases of the Quaternary period. It is the largest of a number of such deflation pans in this area.

== History ==
The former lake of Villeneuve-de-la-Raho had a size of 150 hectares (370 acres). Considered useless, it was dried in 1854, and the land was then used for agriculture. Recovered by the General Council of the Pyrénées-Orientales, it was filled with water and became a lake once again in 1977.

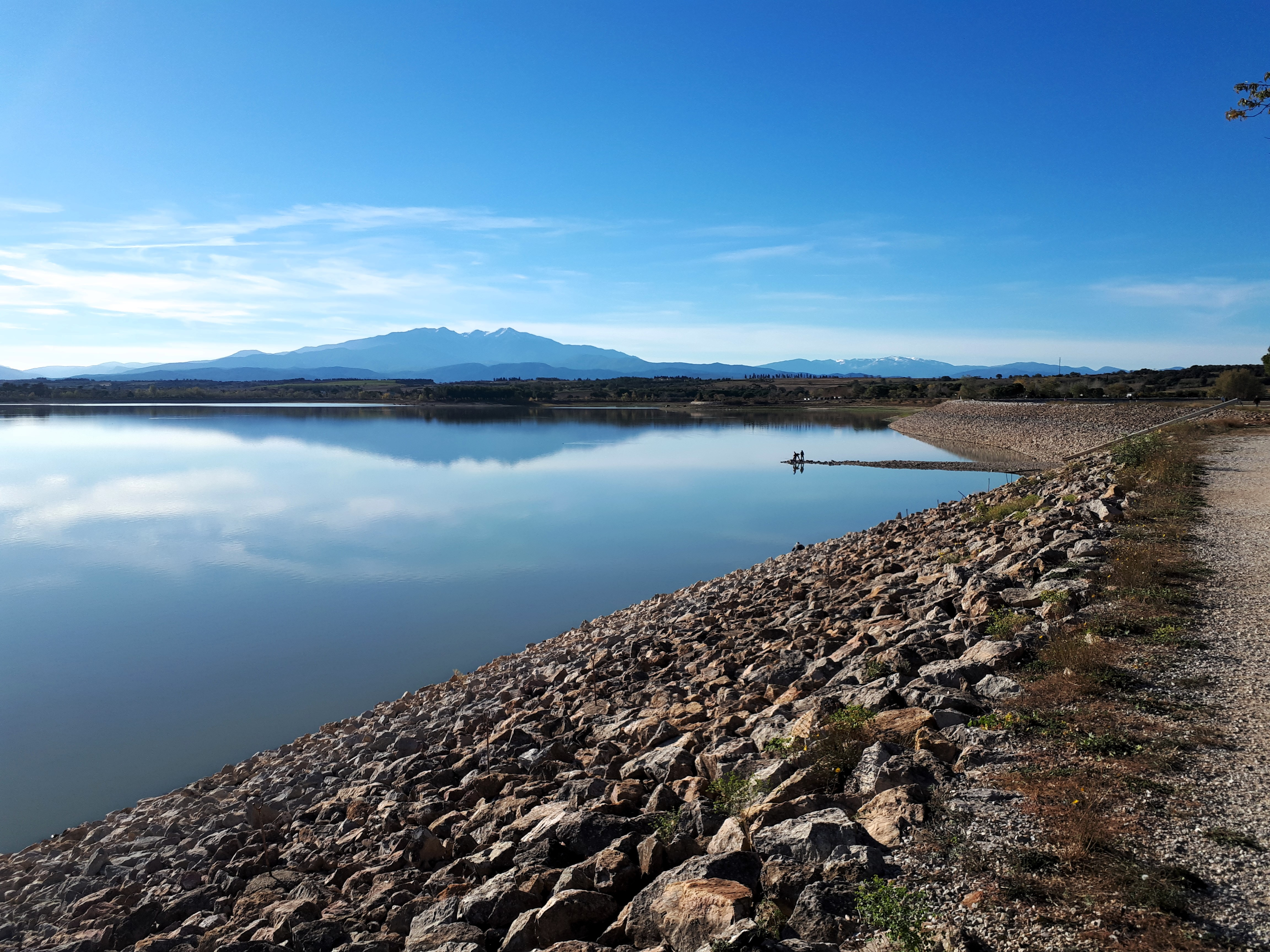
Villeneuve lake with the Canigou massif in the background.
