= Bages, Pyrénées-Orientales =

Bages Bages de Rosselló (Catalan)
- Commune
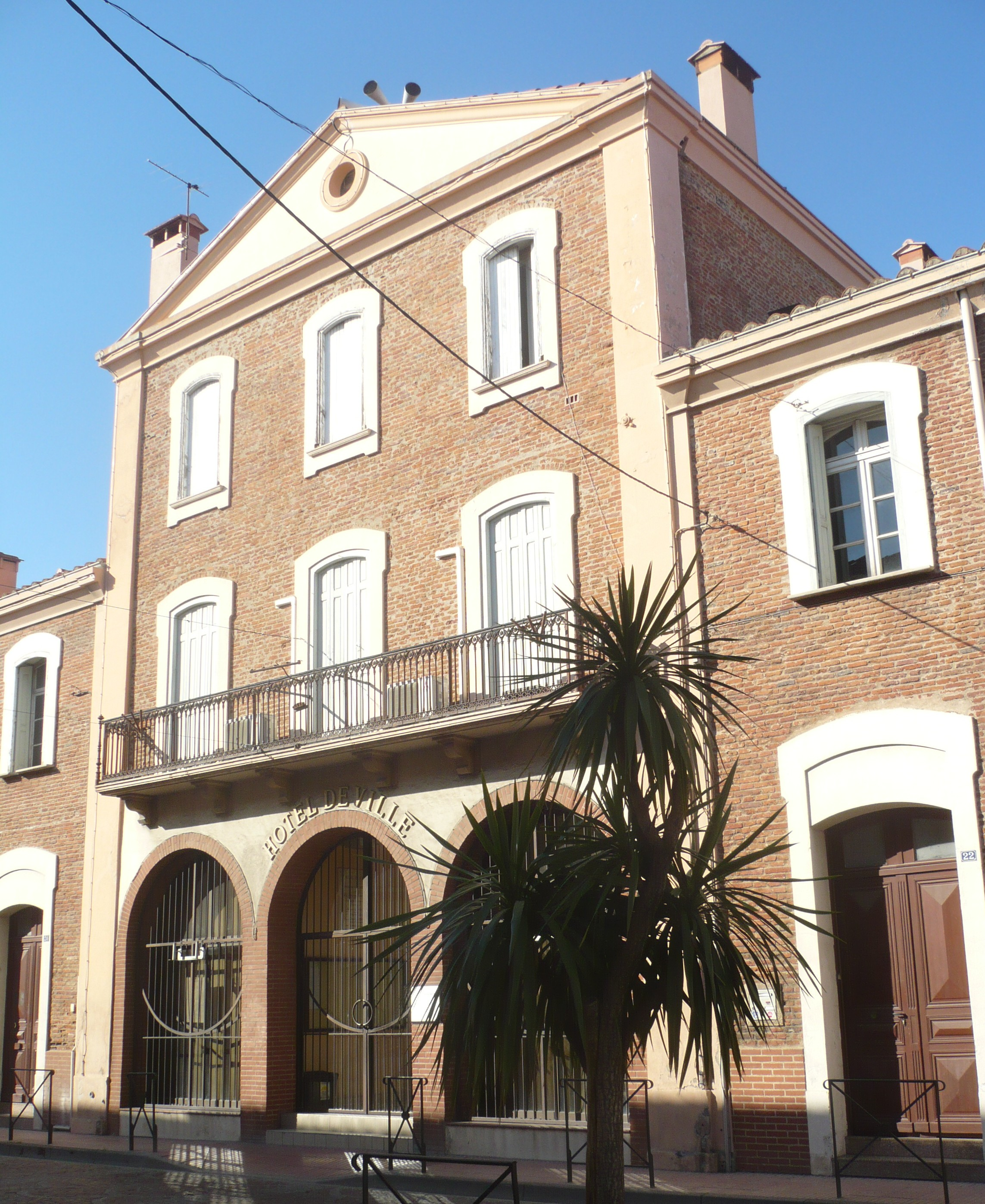
- The town hall in Bages

- Coat of arms
- Location of Bages
- Location within France Location within Occitanie
- Coordinates: 42°36′24″N 2°53′51″E
- Country: France
- Region: Occitania
- Department: Pyrénées-Orientales
- Arrondissement: Céret
- Canton: La Plaine d'Illibéris

Government
  - Mayor (2026–32): Patrice Aybar
- Area^{1}: 11.95 km^{2} (4.61 sq mi)
- Elevation: 17 m (56 ft)
- Highest elevation: 91 m (299 ft)
- Lowest elevation: 14 m (46 ft)
- Population (2023): 4,560
  - Density: 382/km^{2} (988/sq mi)
- Demonym(s): bagéen (fr) bagenc (ca)
- Time zone: UTC+01:00 (CET)
  - Summer (DST): UTC+02:00 (CEST)
- INSEE/Postal code: 66011 /66670
- ^{1} French Land Register data, which excludes lakes, ponds, glaciers > 1 km^{2} (0.386 sq mi or 247 acres) and river estuaries.

Bages (French pronunciation: [baʒ]; Catalan: Bages de Rosselló [ˈbaʒəs də rusəˈʎo]) is a commune in the Pyrénées-Orientales department in southern France.

== Geography ==
=== Localisation ===
Bages is located in the canton of La Plaine d'Illibéris and in the arrondissement of Perpignan.

It is part of the Northern Catalan comarca of Rosselló.

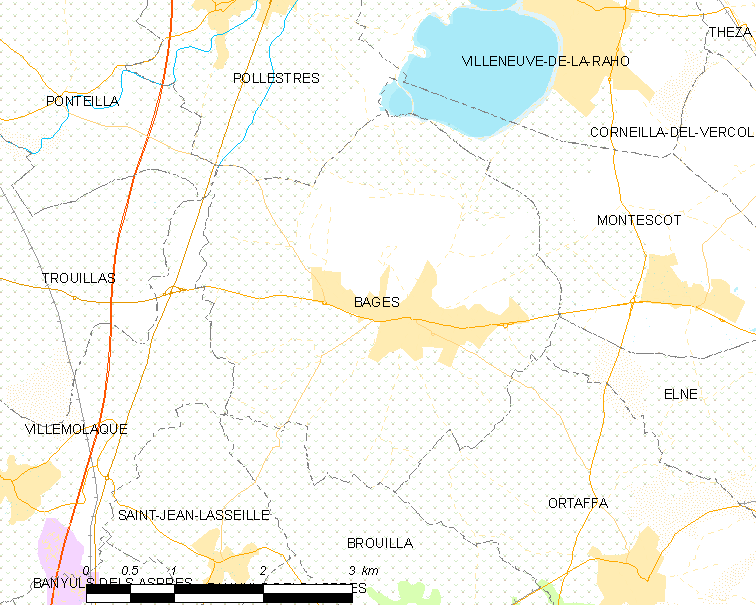
Map of Bages and its surrounding communes

== Government and politics ==
=== Mayors ===
Mayor	Term start	Term end
François Ricard	1959	1983
Jean-Claude Madrénas	1983	1995
Serge Soubielle	1995	2020
Marie Cabrera	2020	2026
Patrice Aybar	2026	

== Population ==
Historical population
Year	Pop.	±% p.a.
1968	1,900	—
1975	2,145	+1.75%
1982	2,711	+3.40%
1990	3,317	+2.55%
1999	3,328	+0.04%
2007	3,779	+1.60%
2012	3,960	+0.94%
2017	4,174	+1.06%
2023	4,560	+1.49%
Source: INSEE

== Notable person ==
- Jean-Pierre Serre (born 1926 in Bages), mathematician

== See also ==
- Communes of the Pyrénées-Orientales department
