= Languedoc-Roussillon =

Coordinates: 43°40′N 3°10′E

Languedoc-Roussillon Lengadòc-Rosselhon (Occitan)
- Region of France
- Flag Coat of arms

- Country: France
- Dissolved: 2016-01-01
- Prefecture: Montpellier
- Departments: 5: Aude (11); Gard (30); Hérault (34); Lozère (48); Pyrénées-Orientales (66)

Government
  - President: Damien Alary (DVG)

Area
  - Total: 27,376 km^{2} (10,570 sq mi)

Population (2012-01-01)
  - Total: 2,700,266
  - Density: 98.636/km^{2} (255.47/sq mi)

GDP
  - Total: €98.094 billion (2024)
  - Per capita: €32,731 (2024)
- Time zone: UTC+1 (CET)
  - Summer (DST): UTC+2 (CEST)
- ISO 3166 code: FR-K
- NUTS Region: FR8
- Website: laregion.fr

Languedoc-Roussillon (French pronunciation: [lɑ̃ɡ(ə)dɔk ʁusijɔ̃]; Occitan: Lengadòc-Rosselhon [ˌleŋɡɔˈðɔk ruseˈʎu]; Catalan: Llenguadoc-Rosselló) is a former administrative region of France. On 1 January 2016, it joined with the region of Midi-Pyrénées to become Occitania. It comprised five departments, and bordered the other French regions of Provence-Alpes-Côte d'Azur, Rhône-Alpes, Auvergne, Midi-Pyrénées towards the north, and Spain, Andorra and the Mediterranean Sea towards the south. It was the southernmost region of mainland France.

== Toponymy ==
The first part of the name of the province of Languedoc-Roussillon comes from the French langue d'oc ("language of oc"), and is also a historical region. In southern France, the word for yes was the Occitan language word oc. Prior to the 16th century, the central area of France was referred to as Languedoil, there the word for yes was oil in Old French, later becoming oui. These old place names referred to the areas where Occitan and Old French were spoken. The Edict of Villers-Cotterets made French the official national language in 1539. Roussillon was the name of the medieval County of Roussillon.

== History ==
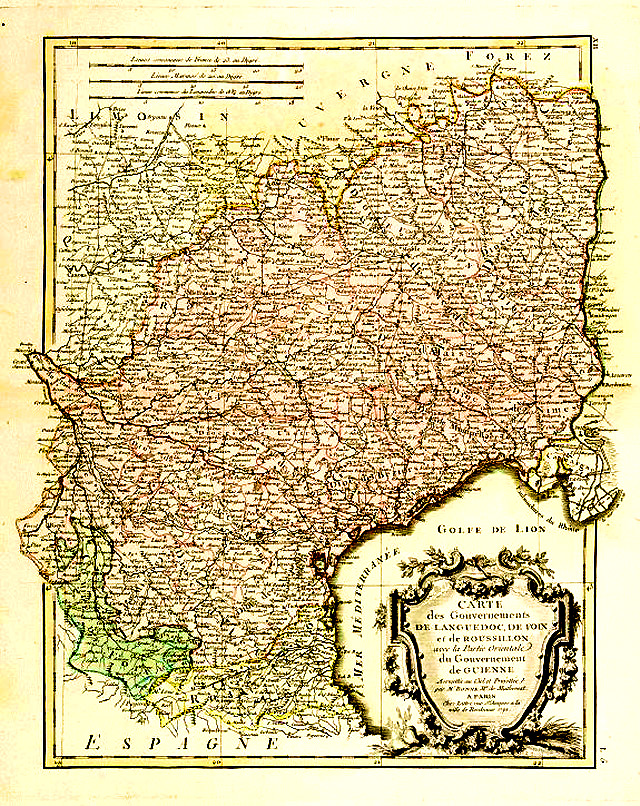
Map of the Governments of Languedoc, Foix and Roussillon by Rigobert Bonne (1727–1795), Paris, circa 1783

The province of Languedoc within its 18th century limits and the current communes and departments.

Towards the end of the 3rd century BC, a Celtic people, the Volcae, took up residence in the region between the Rhône and the Garonne, from the Cévennes to the Pyrenees. Their capitals were Toulouse and Nîmes.

They made a pact with the Romans from the 1st century BC. Narbonne was created to pacify the province in 118 BC and became the capital of the Narbonnaise.

At the beginning of the 5th century, the Vandals invaded the province and then the Visigoths settled there. The Narbonne region, like the Iberian Peninsula, remained Visigothic until its conquest by the Moors between 719 (fall of Narbonne) and 725 (fall of Carcassonne and Nîmes). Narbonne then became the capital of one of the five provinces of Al-Andalus led by a wali for nearly forty years.

The region was conquered by Pépin the Short (fall of Narbonne in 759), who made it the marquisate of Gothia, included in the kingdom of Aquitaine created in 778. This vast territory encompassed all of the south of the Rhône to the Atlantic and was bequeathed by Charlemagne to his son Louis the Pious in 781. The administration was entrusted to the counts of Toulouse.

During the feudal era, a great political fragmentation took place: the counties of Roussillon and Cerdanya passed into the orbit of the Crown of Aragon, while Bas-Languedoc passed under the domination of the house of Trencavel and their rivals the counts of Toulouse.

Raymond IV (1042–1105) achieved through marriage the objective of reunification by enlarging his state to the county of Rouergue, Nîmes, Narbonne, Gévaudan, Agde, Béziers and Uzès.

The fight against Catharism and the Albigensian Crusade led to the extinction of the dynasty of the Counts of Toulouse. The province was united to the Kingdom of France in 1271, with the exception of Montpellier, which remained under the influence of the House of Barcelona and then of Majorca, and which was not attached to the Kingdom of France until 1349. From there was born the royal Languedoc which persisted until the French Revolution.

The Treaty of Corbeil in 1258 ratified the division with the southern territories of the region. The Corbières formed the border between the Kingdom of France and the Principality of Catalonia in the Crown of Aragon.

In 1659, the Treaty of the Pyrenees led to the annexation of Roussillon and northern Cerdanya to the Kingdom of France.

== Population ==
The region is experiencing the strongest demographic growth in France, and could have around 3,300,000 inhabitants by 2030, an increase of 36% compared to 2000. This increase is mainly due to internal migration, natural increase being rather low.

Pyrénées-Orientales has the largest proportion of elderly people (12.10% over 75). Gard and Hérault are the "youngest" departments, but they are destined to "age" considerably in the coming years. By 2020, the number of people aged over 75 is expected to increase by 12% across the region.

=== Religion ===
Catholicism is the most represented religion in the region, particularly at the level of historical monuments and associations. The Ecclesiastical Province of Montpellier (French: Province ecclésiastique de Montpellier) corresponds to the administrative region. The region has 16 cathedrals (Agde, Alès, Alet, Béziers, Carcassonne, Elne, Lodève, Maguelone, Mende, Montpellier, Narbonne, Nîmes, Perpignan, Saint-Papoul, Saint-Pons-de-Thomières, Uzès).

Protestantism is well represented in the region, especially in the Huguenot stronghold of the Cévennes. The Cévennes-Languedoc-Roussillon region of the United Protestant Church includes Gard, Lozère, Hérault, Aude, Pyrénées-Orientales as well as the eastern part of Aveyron. It is an important region by its Protestant population (approximately 20,000 homes), but one of the least extensive of the United Protestant Church of France. In addition to this majority church, the region has since the 19th century a variety of Free, Reformed Evangelical, Baptist, Methodist and Pentecostal churches.

Judaism has been present since the Middle Ages with significant communities fleeing the Almohads, in Narbonne and Béziers. The Jews are thus cited in the will of William V of Montpellier. Islam is also present at the same time.

Catharism appeared in the region in the middle of the 12th century, in Aude.

== Geography ==
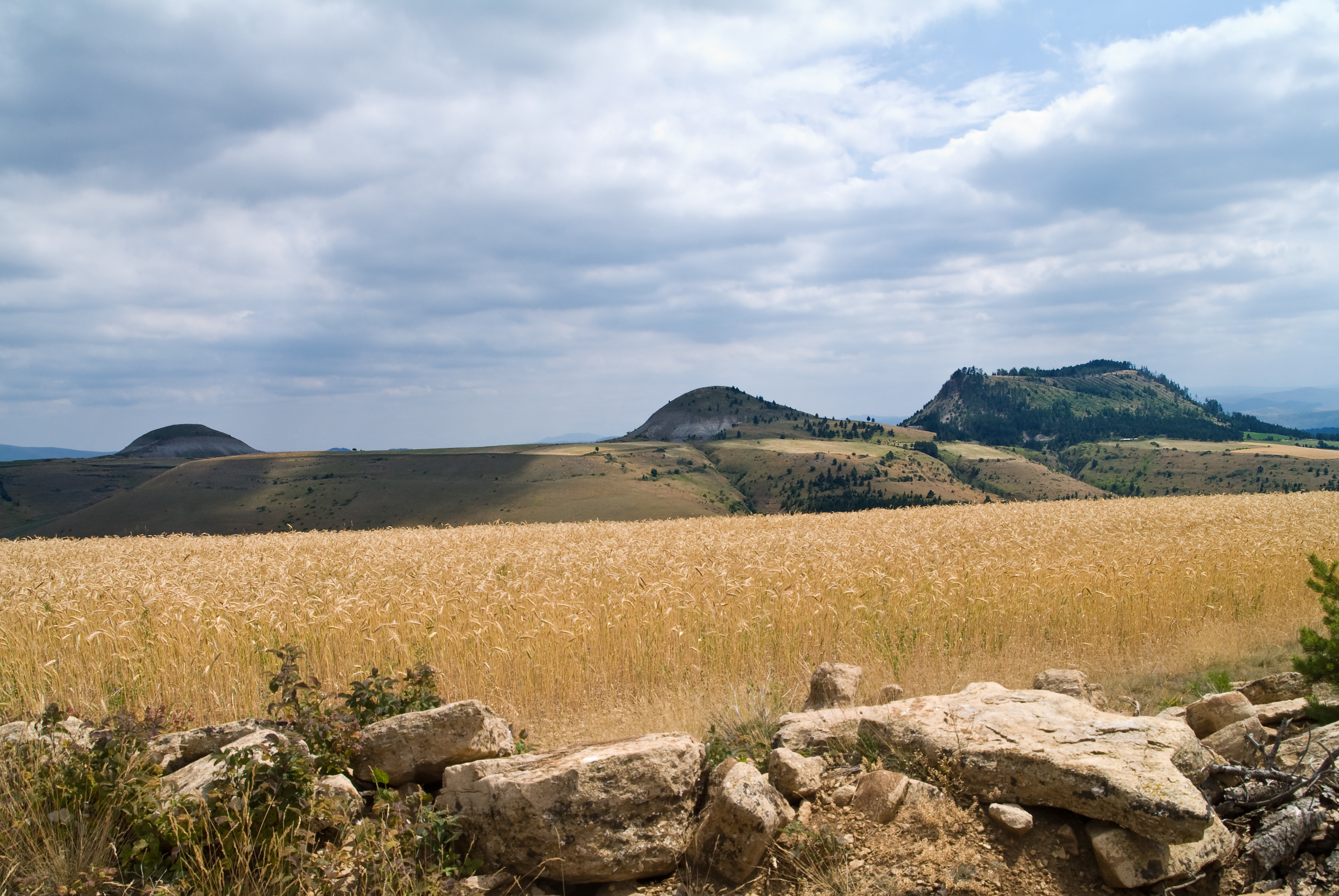
Landscape in Lozère, Languedoc-Roussillon

The region is made up of the following historical provinces:

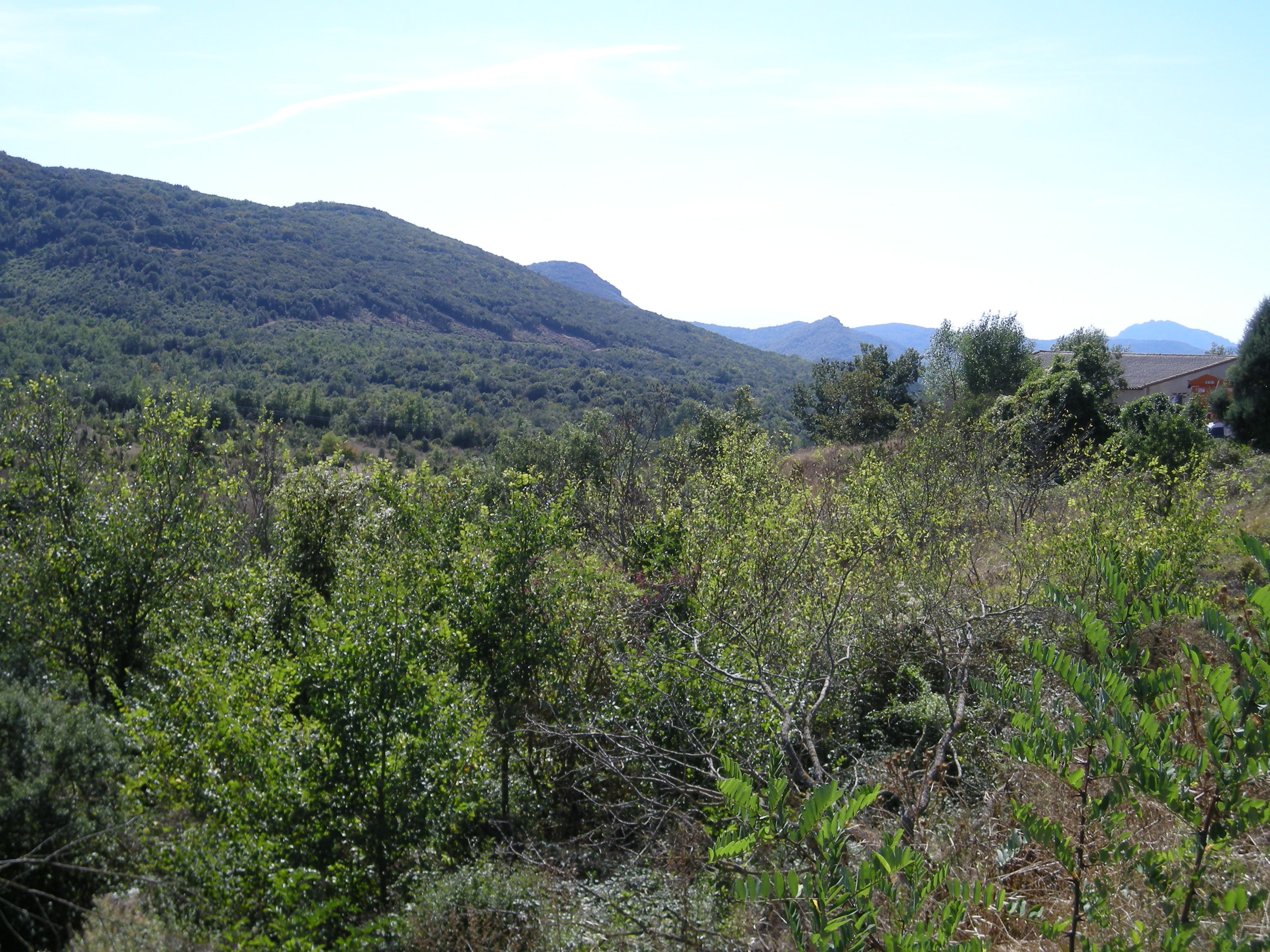
Landscape in Aude, Languedoc-Roussillon

- 68.7% of Languedoc-Roussillon was formerly part the province of Languedoc: the departments of Hérault, Gard, Aude, the extreme south and extreme east of Lozère, and the extreme north of Pyrénées-Orientales. The former province of Languedoc also extends over what is now the Midi-Pyrénées region, including the old capital of Languedoc Toulouse.
- 17.9% of Languedoc-Roussillon was formerly the province of Gévaudan, now the department of Lozère. A small part of the former Gévaudan lies inside the current Auvergne region. Gévaudan is often considered to be a sub-province inside the province of Languedoc, in which case Languedoc would account for 86.6% of Languedoc-Roussillon.
- 13.4% of Languedoc-Roussillon, located in the southernmost part of the region, is a collection of five historical Catalan pays, from east to west: Roussillon, Vallespir, Conflent, Capcir, and Cerdagne, all of which are now part of the department of Pyrénées-Orientales. These pays were part of the Ancien Régime province of Roussillon, owning its name to the largest and most populous of the five pays, Roussillon. "Province of Roussillon and adjacent lands of Cerdagne" was indeed the name that was officially used after the area became French in 1659, based on the historical division of the five pays between the county of Roussillon (Roussillon and Vallespir) and the county of Cerdagne (Cerdagne, Capcir, and Conflent).

Llívia is a town of Cerdanya, province of Girona, Catalonia, Spain, that forms a Spanish exclave surrounded by French territory (department of Pyrénées-Orientales).

== Politics ==
Unofficial coat of arms of Languedoc-Roussillon

At the regional elections in March 2004, the socialist mayor of Montpellier Georges Frêche, defeated its center-right president. Since then, Georges Frêche has embarked on a complete overhaul of the region and its institutions. The flag of the region, which displayed the cross of Languedoc as well as the Flag of Roussillon (the Senyera), was changed for a new flag with no reference to the old provinces, except in terms of the colors (red and yellow), which are the colors of both Languedoc and all the territories from the former Crown of Aragon.

Georges Frêche also wanted to change the name of the region, wishing to erase its duality (Languedoc vs. Roussillon) and strengthen its unity. Thus, he wanted to rename the region Septimanie (Septimania). Septimania was the name created by the Romans at the end of the Roman Empire for the coastal area corresponding quite well to present day Languedoc-Roussillon (including Roussillon, but not including Gévaudan), and used in the early Middle Ages for the area. This name, however, has not been in use since the 9th century, and it sounded quite odd to French people. Strong opposition of the population led to Georges Frêche giving up on his idea. He declared that he still believed in it but could not go ahead without a mandate.

Catalan nationalists in Roussillon would like the Pyrénées-Orientales department to secede from Languedoc-Roussillon and become a region in its own right, under the proposed name of Catalunya Nord (Northern Catalonia), as part of the Països Catalans (Catalan Countries), a new country. This idea has minimal popular support.

On the other hand, there are some who would like to merge the Languedoc-Roussillon and Midi-Pyrénées regions, thus reunifying the old province of Languedoc, and creating a large region.

== See also ==
- Languedoc wine
- List of appellations in Languedoc-Roussillon
- List of châteaux in Languedoc-Roussillon
