= Montescot =

- Commune
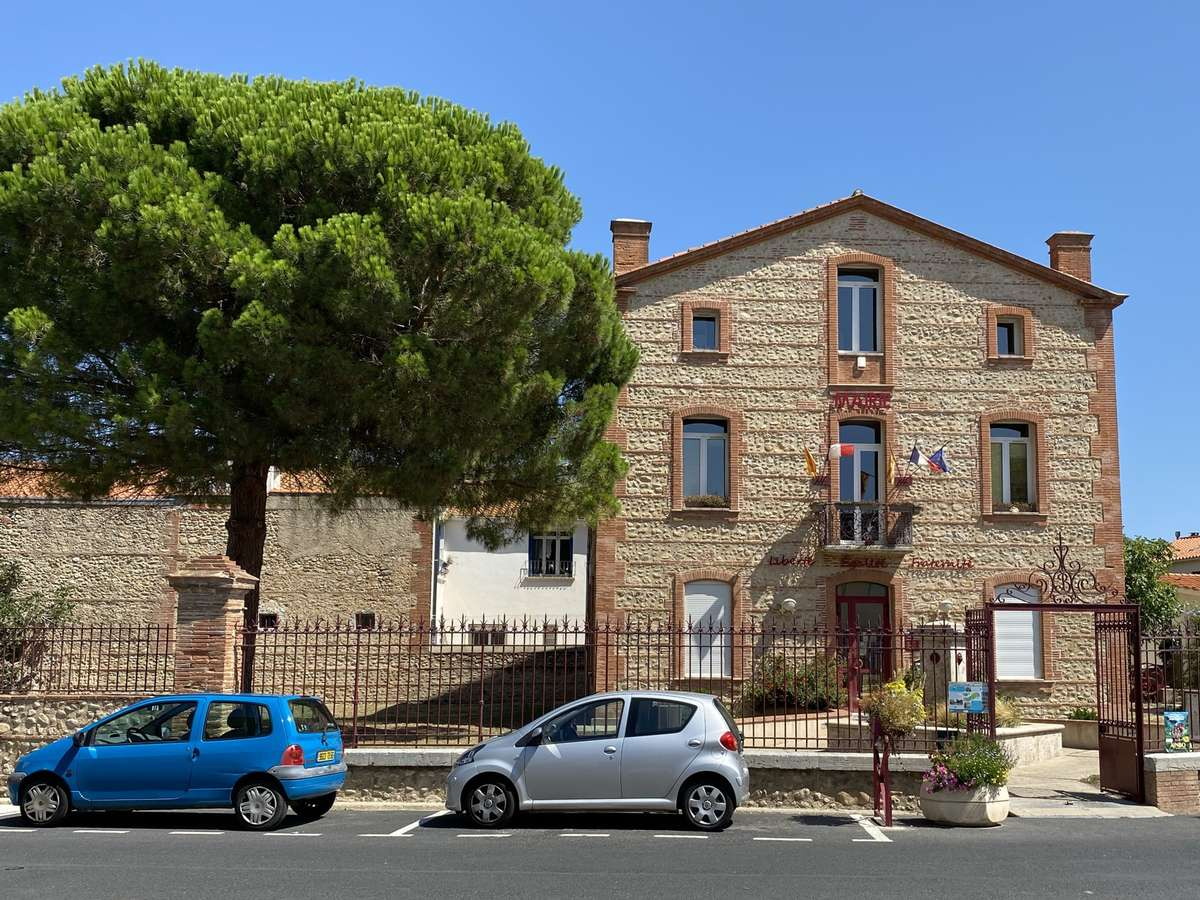
- The town hall in Montescot

- Coat of arms
- Location of Montescot
- Location within France Location within Occitanie
- Coordinates: 42°36′32″N 2°56′05″E
- Country: France
- Region: Occitania
- Department: Pyrénées-Orientales
- Arrondissement: Céret
- Canton: La Plaine d'Illibéris
- Intercommunality: Sud-Roussillon

Government
  - Mayor (2020–2026): Louis Sala
- Area^{1}: 6.02 km^{2} (2.32 sq mi)
- Elevation: 14 m (46 ft)
- Highest elevation: 40 m (130 ft)
- Lowest elevation: 16 m (52 ft)
- Population (2023): 1,586
  - Density: 263/km^{2} (682/sq mi)
- Time zone: UTC+01:00 (CET)
  - Summer (DST): UTC+02:00 (CEST)
- INSEE/Postal code: 66114 /66200
- ^{1} French Land Register data, which excludes lakes, ponds, glaciers > 1 km^{2} (0.386 sq mi or 247 acres) and river estuaries.

Montescot (French pronunciation: [mɔ̃tɛsko]) is a commune in the Pyrénées-Orientales department in southern France.

== Geography ==
Montescot is located in the canton of La Plaine d'Illibéris and in the arrondissement of Perpignan.

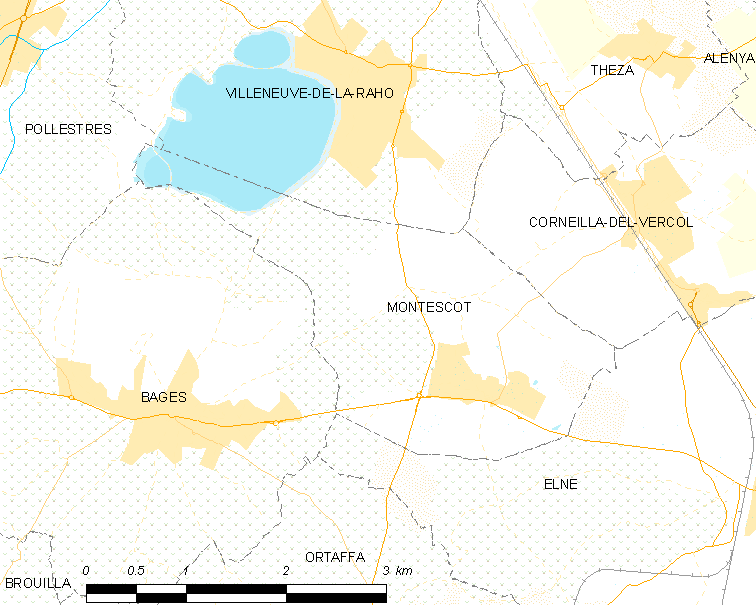
Map of Montescot and its surrounding communes

== Population ==
Historical population
Year	Pop.	±% p.a.
1968	221	—
1975	471	+11.42%
1982	612	+3.81%
1990	1,128	+7.94%
1999	1,375	+2.22%
2007	1,593	+1.86%
2012	1,712	+1.45%
2017	1,712	+0.00%
2023	1,586	−1.27%
Source: INSEE

== See also ==
- Communes of the Pyrénées-Orientales department
- Via Domitia
