= Villeneuve-de-la-Raho =

Villeneuve-de-la-Raho Vilanova de Raò
- Commune
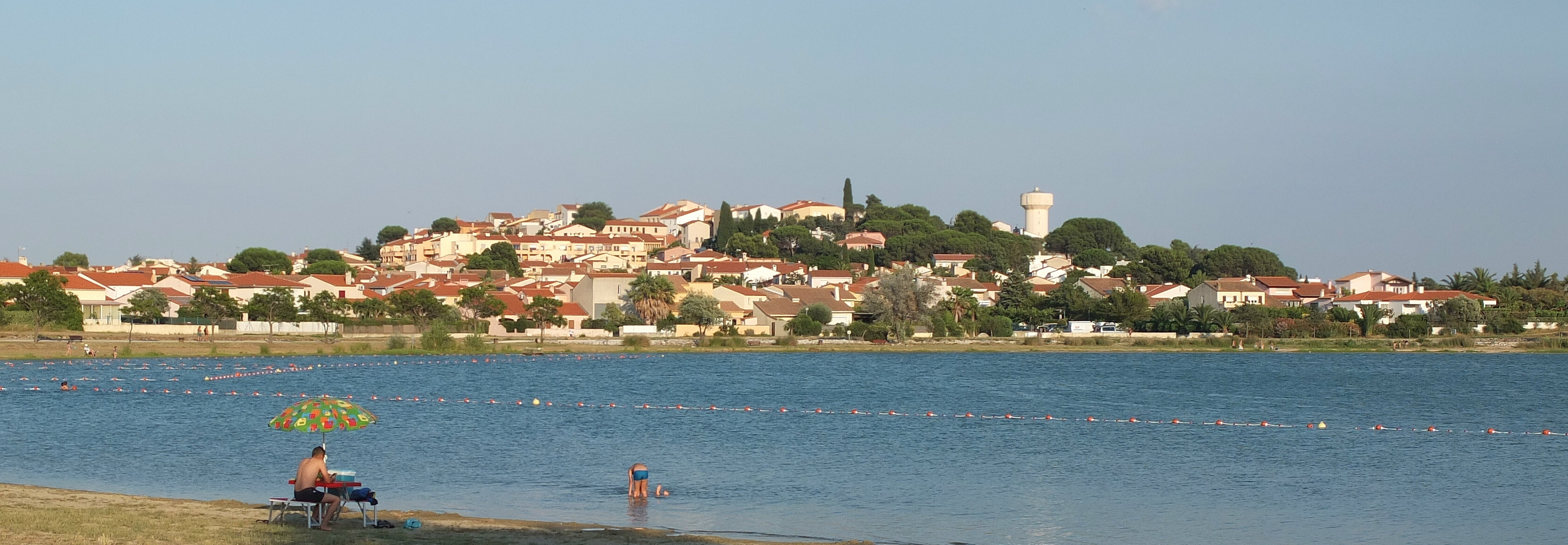
- View of the town across the "Lac de la Raho"

- Coat of arms
- Location of Villeneuve-de-la-Raho
- Location within France Location within Occitanie
- Coordinates: 42°38′15″N 2°55′05″E
- Country: France
- Region: Occitania
- Department: Pyrénées-Orientales
- Arrondissement: Perpignan
- Canton: La Plaine d'Illibéris
- Intercommunality: Perpignan Méditerranée Métropole

Government
  - Mayor (2020–2026): Jacqueline Irles
- Area^{1}: 11.41 km^{2} (4.41 sq mi)
- Elevation: 55 m (180 ft)
- Highest elevation: 62 m (203 ft)
- Lowest elevation: 16 m (52 ft)
- Population (2023): 4,470
  - Density: 392/km^{2} (1,010/sq mi)
- Time zone: UTC+01:00 (CET)
  - Summer (DST): UTC+02:00 (CEST)
- INSEE/Postal code: 66227 /66180
- ^{1} French Land Register data, which excludes lakes, ponds, glaciers > 1 km^{2} (0.386 sq mi or 247 acres) and river estuaries.

Villeneuve-de-la-Raho (French pronunciation: [vilnœv də la ʁa.o]; Catalan: Vilanova de Raò) is a commune in the Pyrénées-Orientales department, southern France.

== Geography ==
Villeneuve-de-la-Raho is located in the canton of La Plaine d'Illibéris and in the arrondissement of Perpignan. The town is the location of Lac de Villeneuve-de-la-Raho.

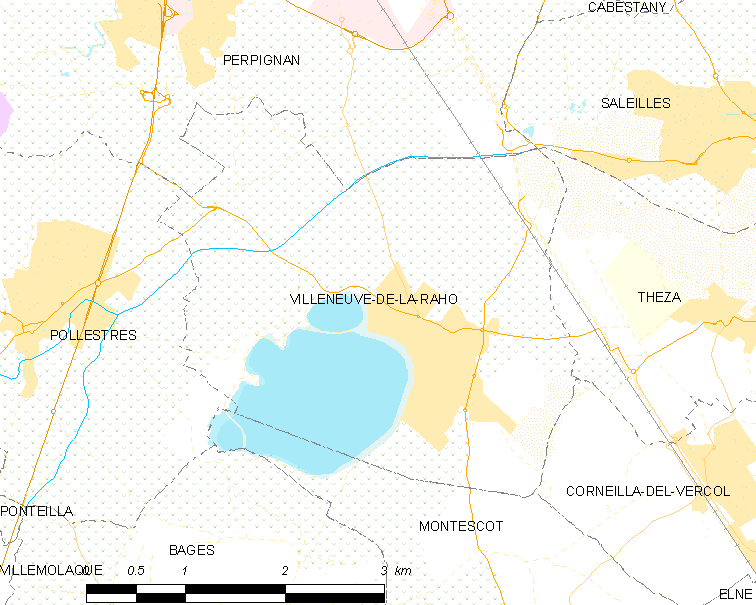
Map of Villeneuve-de-la-Raho and its surrounding communes

== Population ==
Historical population
Year	Pop.	±% p.a.
1968	630	—
1975	908	+5.36%
1982	1,234	+4.48%
1990	3,189	+12.60%
1999	3,625	+1.43%
2007	3,763	+0.47%
2012	3,828	+0.34%
2017	3,926	+0.51%
2023	4,470	+2.19%
Source: INSEE

== See also ==
- Communes of the Pyrénées-Orientales department
- Lac de Villeneuve-de-la-Raho
