= Ortaffa =

Ortaffa Hortafà
- Commune
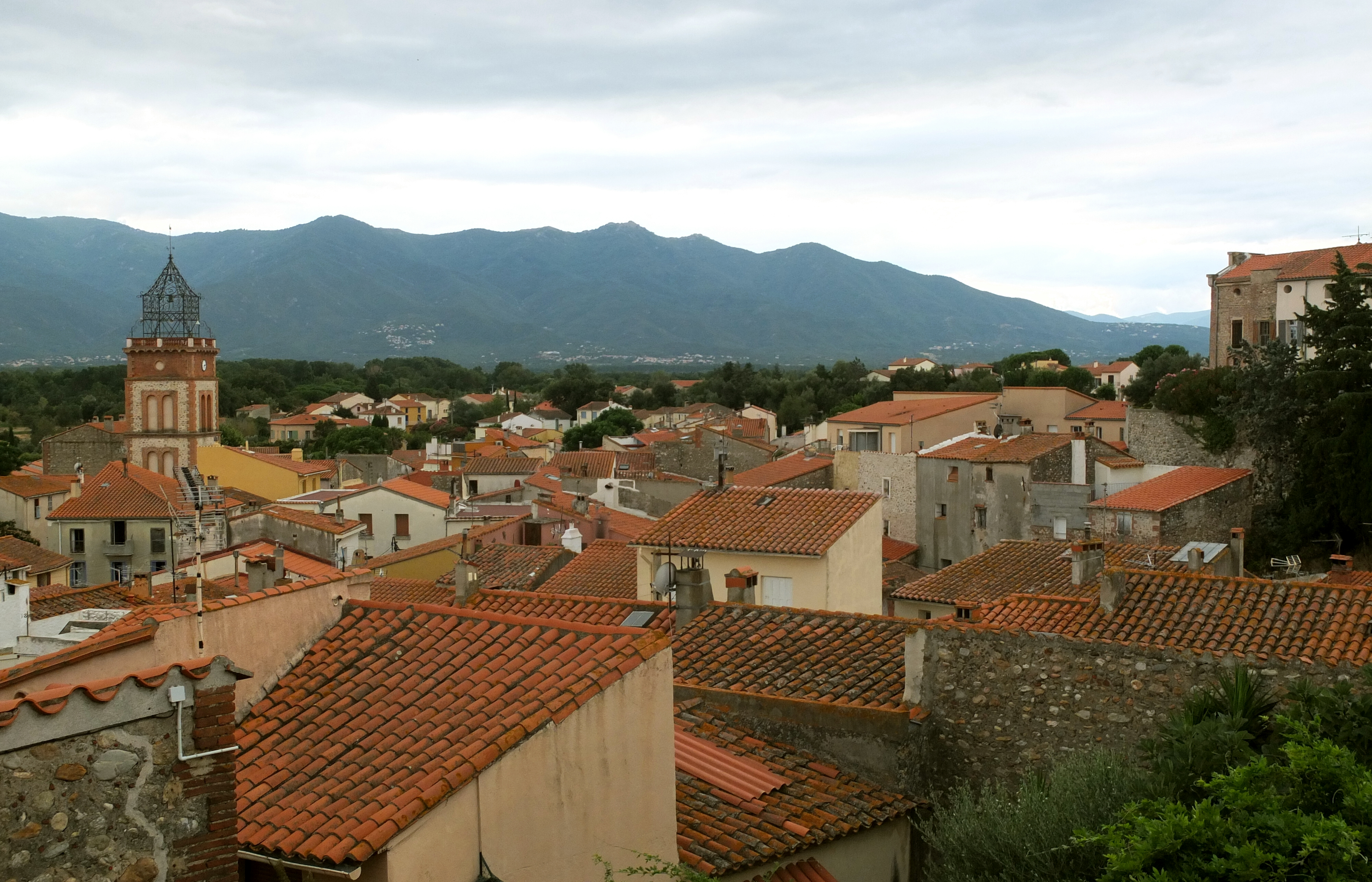
- General view of the village.

- Coat of arms
- Location of Ortaffa
- Location within France Location within Occitanie
- Coordinates: 42°34′51″N 2°55′33″E
- Country: France
- Region: Occitania
- Department: Pyrénées-Orientales
- Arrondissement: Céret
- Canton: La Plaine d'Illibéris

Government
  - Mayor (2020–2026): Raymond Pla
- Area^{1}: 8.49 km^{2} (3.28 sq mi)
- Elevation: 44 m (144 ft)
- Highest elevation: 90 m (300 ft)
- Lowest elevation: 19 m (62 ft)
- Population (2023): 1,980
  - Density: 233/km^{2} (604/sq mi)
- Time zone: UTC+01:00 (CET)
  - Summer (DST): UTC+02:00 (CEST)
- INSEE/Postal code: 66129 /66560
- ^{1} French Land Register data, which excludes lakes, ponds, glaciers > 1 km^{2} (0.386 sq mi or 247 acres) and river estuaries.

Ortaffa (French pronunciation: [ɔʁtafa]; Catalan: Ortafà) is a commune in the Pyrénées-Orientales department in southern France.

== Geography ==
Ortaffa is located in the canton of La Plaine d'Illibéris and in the arrondissement of Perpignan.

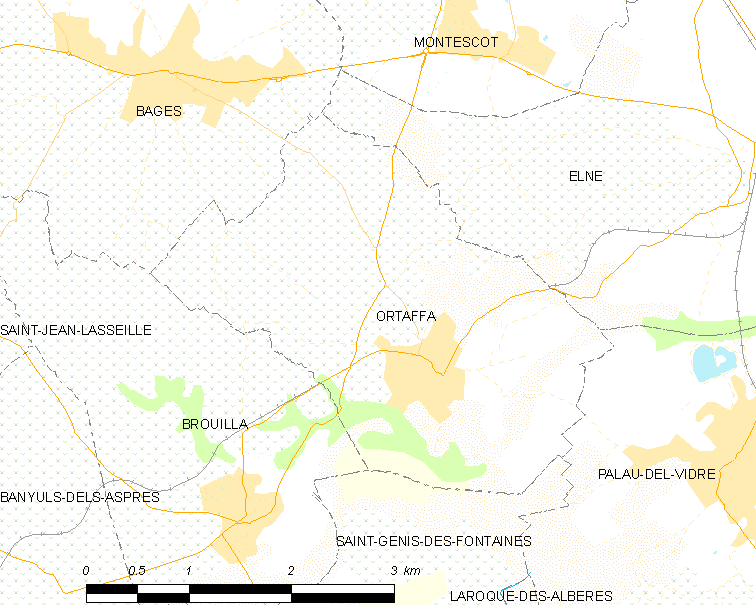
Map of Ortaffa and its surrounding communes

== Population ==
Historical population
Year	Pop.	±% p.a.
1968	534	—
1975	606	+1.82%
1982	636	+0.69%
1990	803	+2.96%
1999	1,093	+3.49%
2007	1,285	+2.04%
2012	1,270	−0.23%
2017	1,481	+3.12%
2023	1,980	+4.96%
Source: INSEE

== See also ==
- Communes of the Pyrénées-Orientales department
