= Latour-Bas-Elne =

Latour-Bas-Elne La Torre d'Elna
- Commune
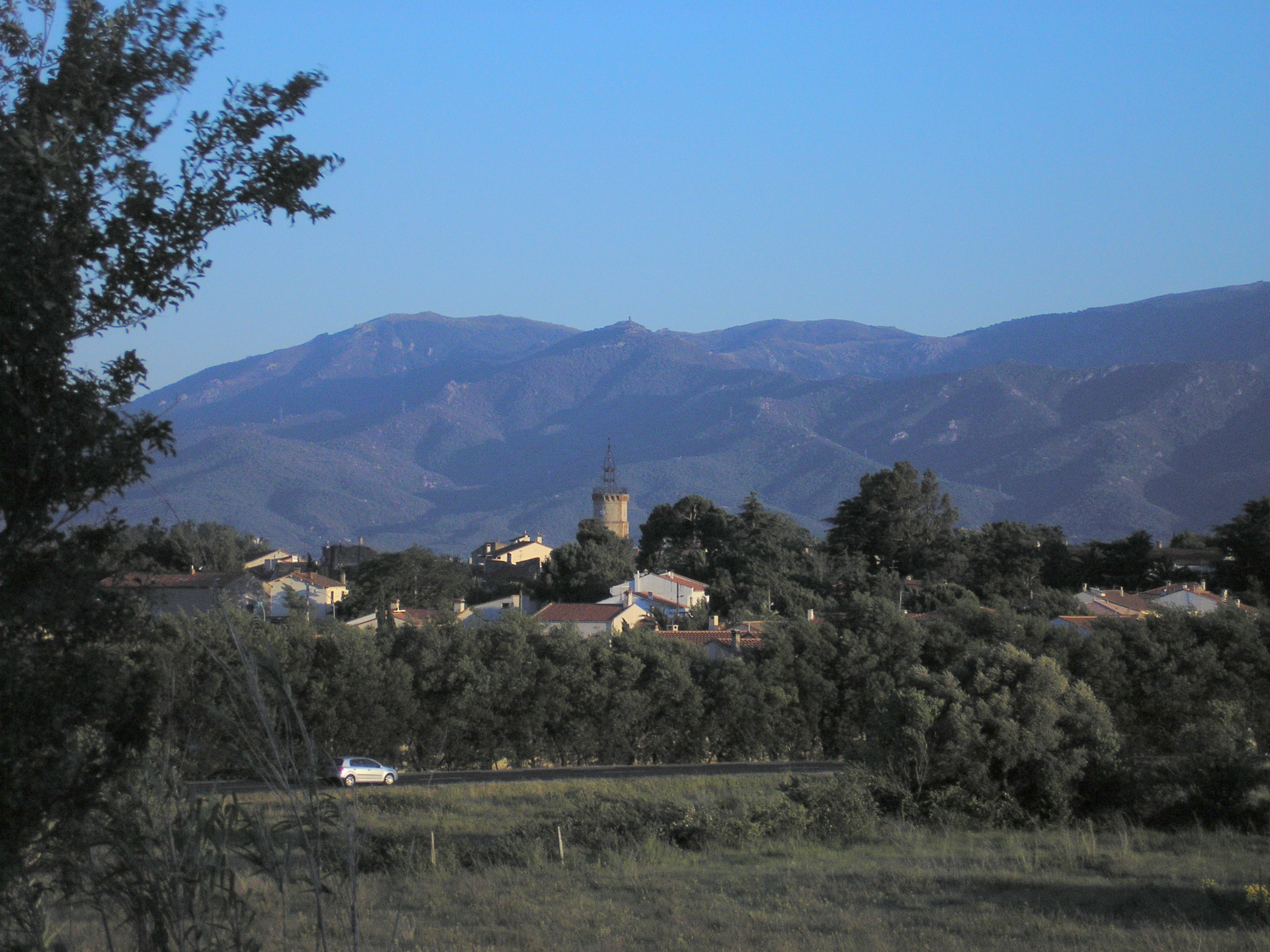
- Latour-Bas-Elne, with the Albera Massif in the background
- Location of Latour-Bas-Elne
- Location within France Location within Occitanie
- Coordinates: 42°36′26″N 3°00′11″E
- Country: France
- Region: Occitania
- Department: Pyrénées-Orientales
- Arrondissement: Céret
- Canton: La Plaine d'Illibéris
- Intercommunality: Sud Roussillon

Government
  - Mayor (2020–2026): François Bonneau
- Area^{1}: 3.31 km^{2} (1.28 sq mi)
- Elevation: 12 m (39 ft)
- Highest elevation: 29 m (95 ft)
- Lowest elevation: 4 m (13 ft)
- Population (2023): 3,228
  - Density: 975/km^{2} (2,530/sq mi)
- Time zone: UTC+01:00 (CET)
  - Summer (DST): UTC+02:00 (CEST)
- INSEE/Postal code: 66094 /66200
- ^{1} French Land Register data, which excludes lakes, ponds, glaciers > 1 km^{2} (0.386 sq mi or 247 acres) and river estuaries.

Latour-Bas-Elne (French: [latuʁ ba.z‿ɛln]; Catalan: La Torre d'Elna) is a commune in the Pyrénées-Orientales department in southern France.

== Geography ==
Latour-Bas-Elne is located in the canton of La Plaine d'Illibéris and in the arrondissement of Perpignan.

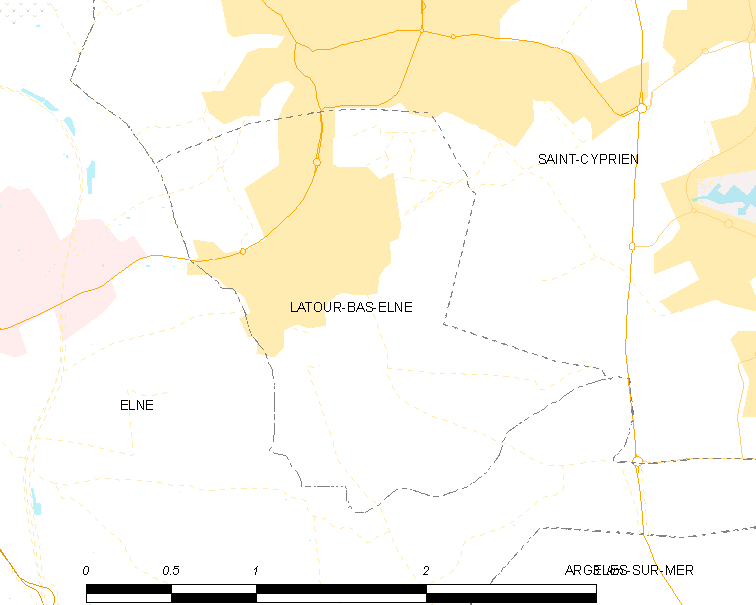
Map of Latour-Bas-Elne and its surrounding communes

== Population ==
Historical population
Year	Pop.	±% p.a.
1968	631	—
1975	661	+0.67%
1982	945	+5.24%
1990	1,346	+4.52%
1999	1,711	+2.70%
2007	2,057	+2.33%
2012	2,223	+1.56%
2017	2,797	+4.70%
2023	3,228	+2.42%
Source: INSEE

== See also ==
- Communes of the Pyrénées-Orientales department
