= Elne Cathedral =

Former cathedral in Elne, France

Coordinates: 42°35′57″N 2°58′20″E

Elne Cathedral Cathédrale Sainte-Eulalie-et-Sainte-Julie d'Elne
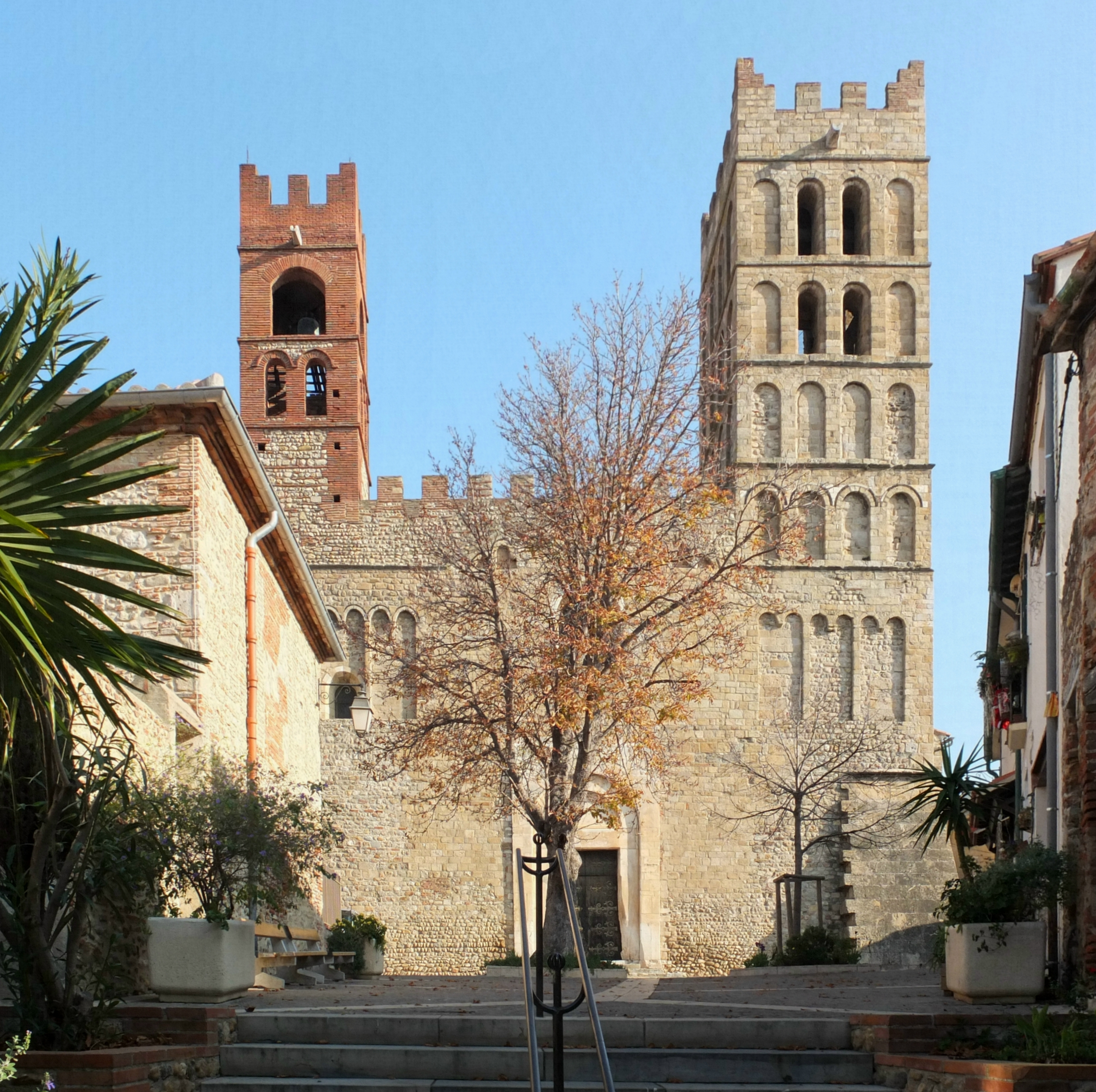
- Elne Cathedral

Religion
- Affiliation: Roman Catholic Church
- Province: Bishopric of Elne
- Region: Pyrénées-Orientales
- Rite: Roman
- Ecclesiastical or organisational status: Cathedral
- Status: Active

Location
- Location: Elne, Pyrénées-Orientales, France
- Interactive map of Elne Cathedral; Cathédrale Sainte-Eulalie-et-Sainte-Julie d'Elne

Architecture
- Type: church
- Groundbreaking: 11th century

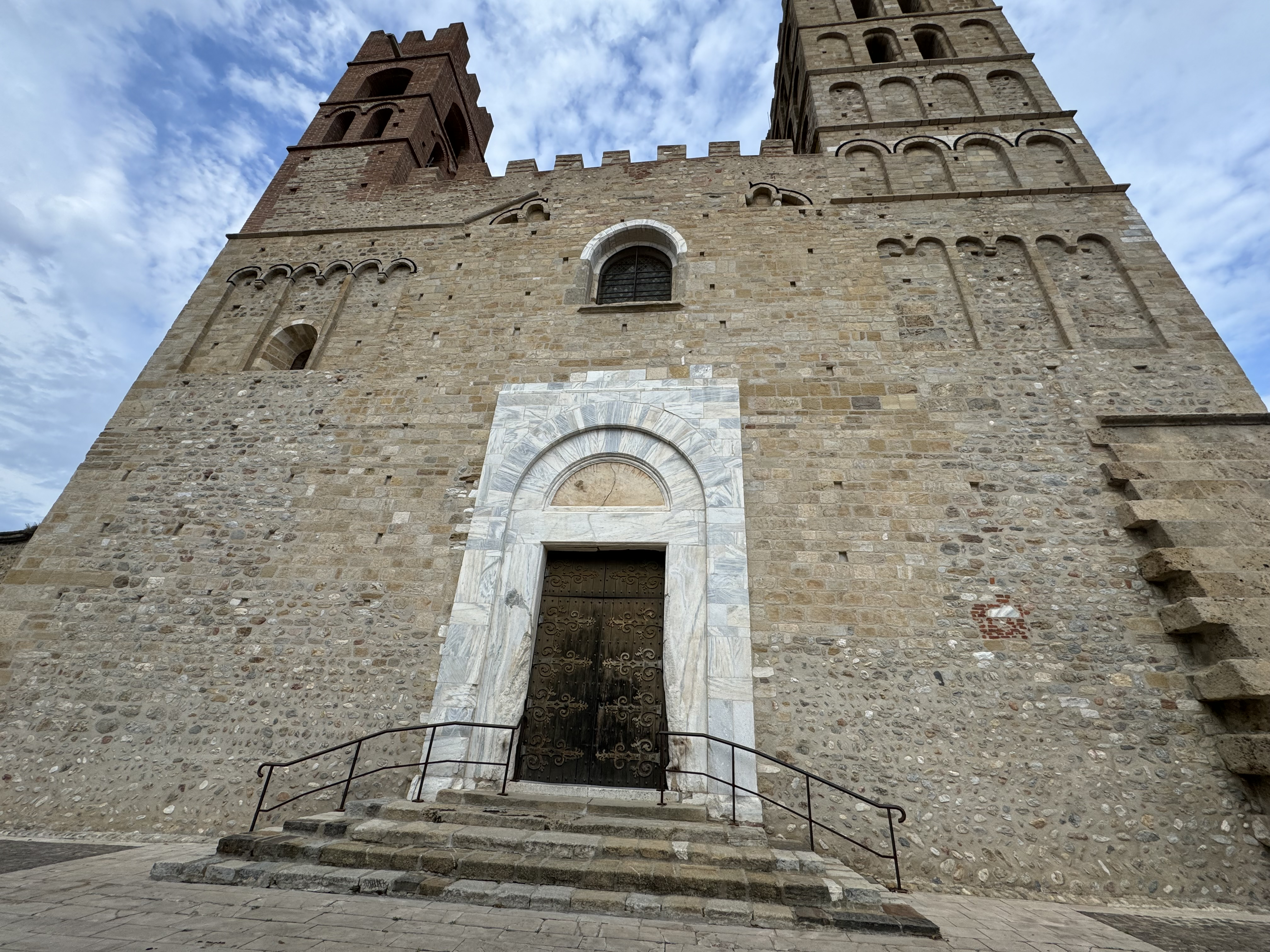
Front entrance

Elne Cathedral (French: Cathédrale Sainte-Eulalie-et-Sainte-Julie d'Elne, Catalan: Catedral de Santa Eulàlia d'Elna) is a Roman Catholic church and former cathedral located in the town of Elne in the County of Roussillon, France.

It was the seat of the former Bishopric of Elne, which was transferred to the Bishopric and cathedral of Perpignan in 1601.

It also had a tight room with a design inspired from cathedral of Tolouse, Saint Stephen's Cathedral where guilty people were locked away for 48 hours, until they calmed down.

The cathedral was consecrated in 1069. In 1285, during the Aragonese Crusade, French troops sacked the town and massacred the townspeople who had taken refuge in the cathedral.

== Gallery ==
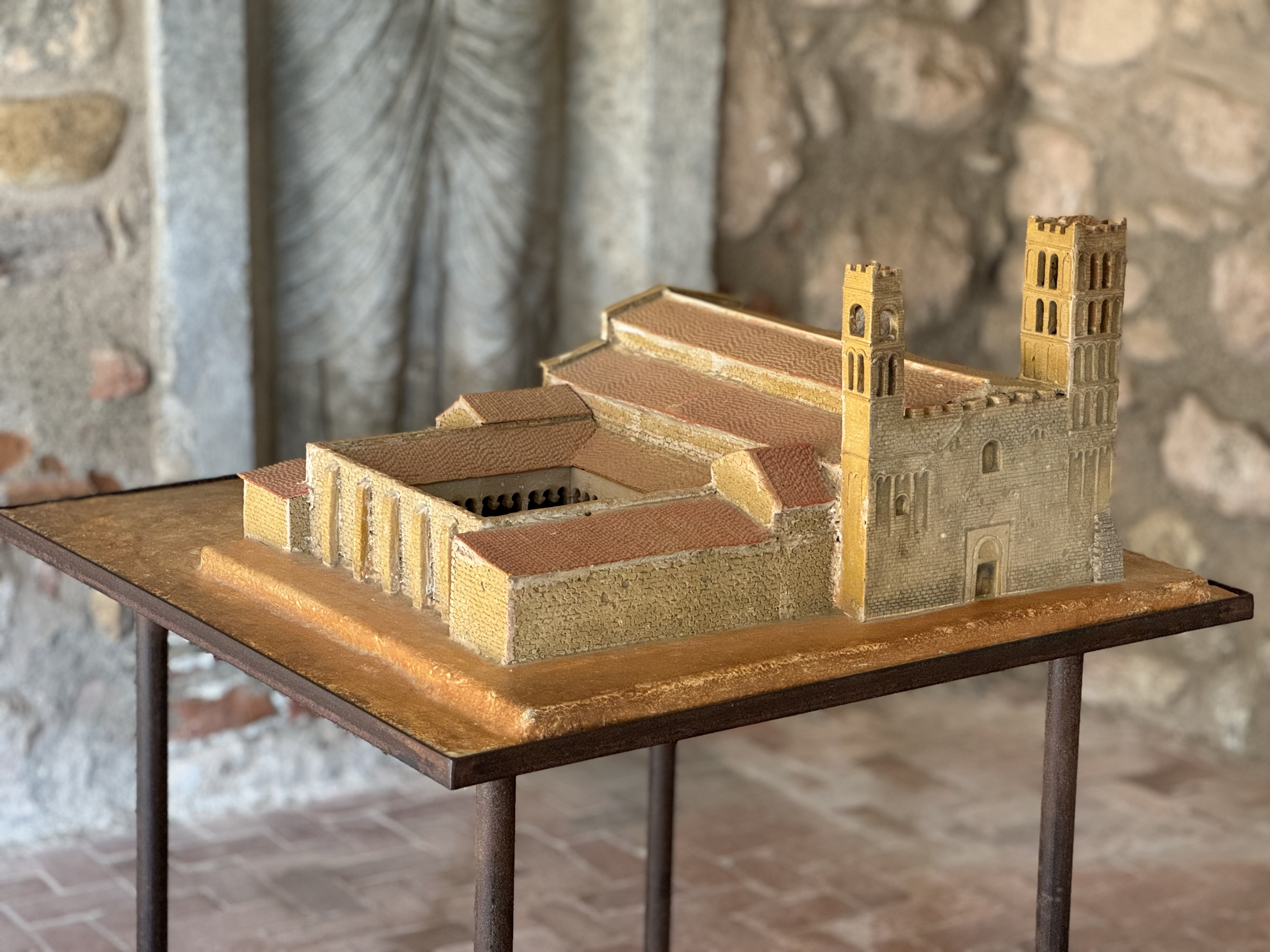
Scheme of cathedral
