= Théza =

Théza Tesà
- Commune
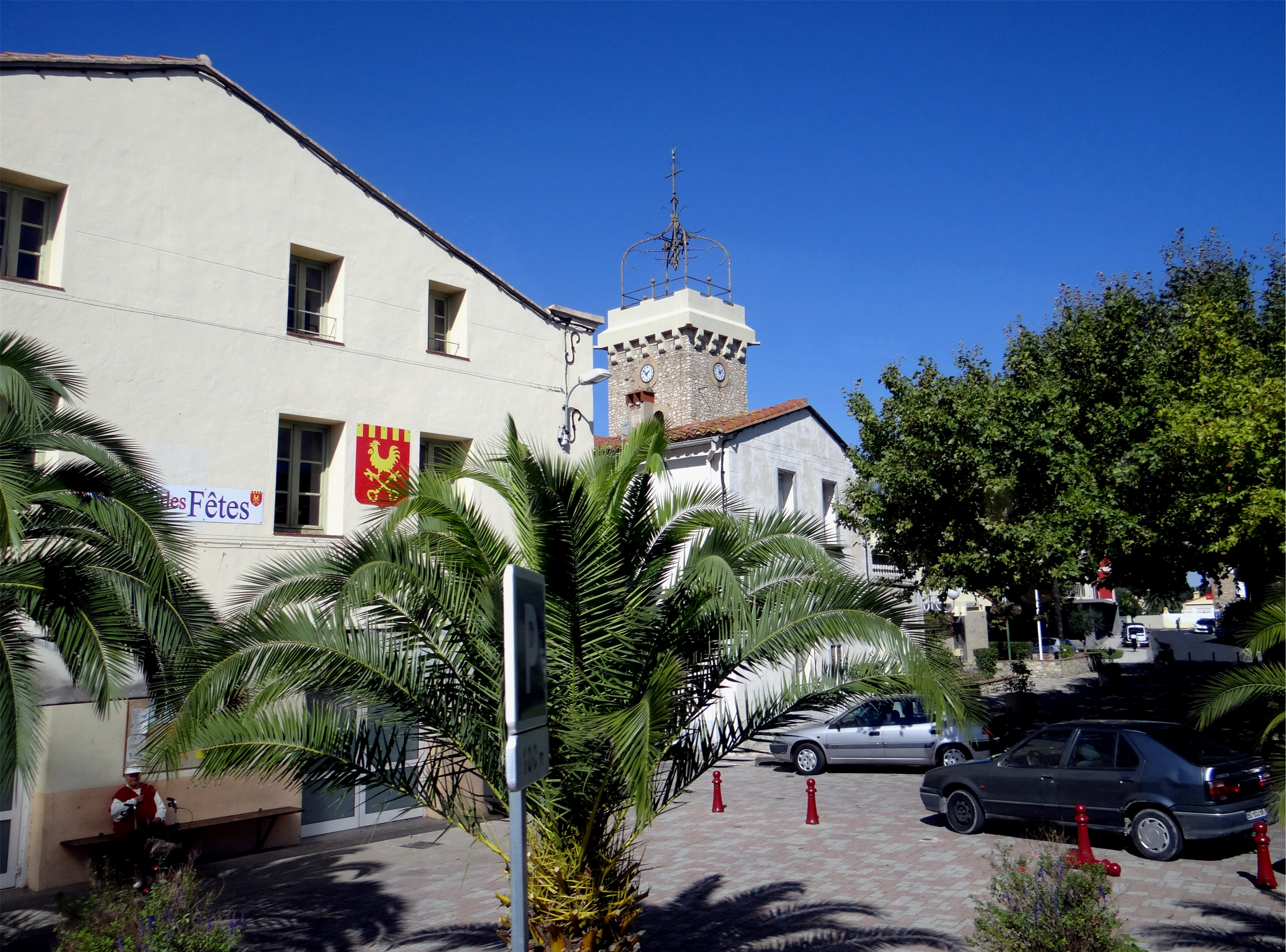
- The Place de la promenade, in Théza

- Coat of arms
- Location of Théza
- Location within France Location within Occitanie
- Coordinates: 42°38′20″N 2°57′13″E
- Country: France
- Region: Occitania
- Department: Pyrénées-Orientales
- Arrondissement: Céret
- Canton: La Plaine d'Illibéris

Government
  - Mayor (2020–2026): Jean Jacques Thibaut
- Area^{1}: 4.83 km^{2} (1.86 sq mi)
- Elevation: 10 m (33 ft)
- Highest elevation: 27 m (89 ft)
- Lowest elevation: 13 m (43 ft)
- Population (2023): 2,126
  - Density: 440/km^{2} (1,140/sq mi)
- Time zone: UTC+01:00 (CET)
  - Summer (DST): UTC+02:00 (CEST)
- INSEE/Postal code: 66208 /66200
- ^{1} French Land Register data, which excludes lakes, ponds, glaciers > 1 km^{2} (0.386 sq mi or 247 acres) and river estuaries.

Théza (French pronunciation: [teza]; Catalan: Tesà) is a commune in the Pyrénées-Orientales department in southern France.

== Geography ==
Théza is located in the canton of La Plaine d'Illibéris and in the arrondissement of Perpignan.

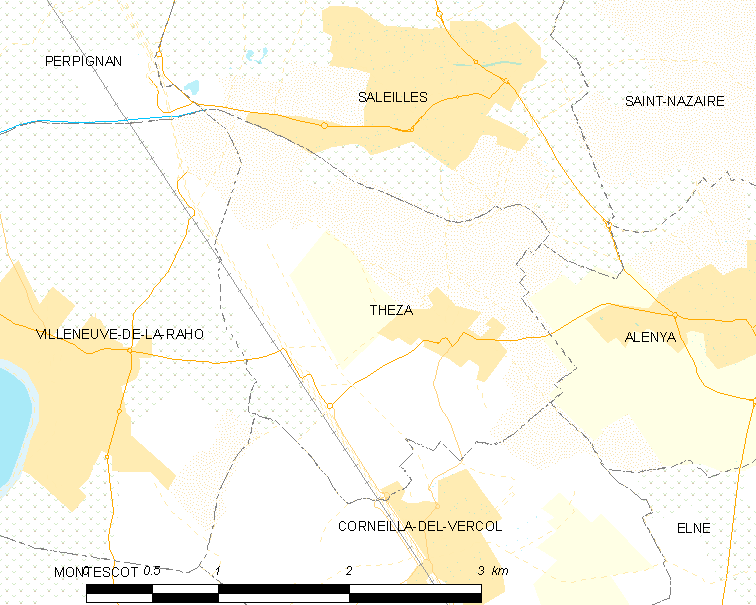
Map of Théza and its surrounding communes

== Population ==
Historical population
Year	Pop.	±% p.a.
1968	554	—
1975	780	+5.01%
1982	929	+2.53%
1990	1,013	+1.09%
1999	1,252	+2.38%
2007	1,343	+0.88%
2012	1,602	+3.59%
2017	2,040	+4.95%
2023	2,126	+0.69%
Source: INSEE

== See also ==
- Communes of the Pyrénées-Orientales department
