= Elne =

- Commune
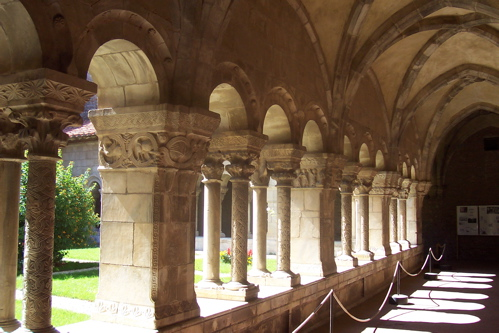
- Cloister of Elne

- Coat of arms
- Location of Elne
- Location within France Location within Occitanie
- Coordinates: 42°35′59″N 2°58′16″E
- Country: France
- Region: Occitania
- Department: Pyrénées-Orientales
- Arrondissement: Céret
- Canton: La Plaine d'Illibéris
- Intercommunality: CC des Albères, de la Côte Vermeille et de l'Illibéris

Government
  - Mayor (2020–2026): Nicolas Garcia
- Area^{1}: 21.29 km^{2} (8.22 sq mi)
- Elevation: 23 m (75 ft)
- Highest elevation: 65 m (213 ft)
- Lowest elevation: 0 m (0 ft)
- Population (2023): 9,511
  - Density: 446.7/km^{2} (1,157/sq mi)
- Time zone: UTC+01:00 (CET)
  - Summer (DST): UTC+02:00 (CEST)
- INSEE/Postal code: 66065 /66200
- ^{1} French Land Register data, which excludes lakes, ponds, glaciers > 1 km^{2} (0.386 sq mi or 247 acres) and river estuaries.

Elne (French pronunciation: [ɛln]; Catalan: Elna [ˈɛlnə]) is a commune in the Pyrénées-Orientales department in southern France.

It lies in the former province of Roussillon, of which it was the first capital, being later replaced by Perpignan. Its inhabitants are still called Illibériens in reference to the city's Iberian name, Illiberis, one that it shared with the Illiberis that became Granada, Spain.

== Geography ==
Elne is located in the canton of La Plaine d'Illibéris and in the arrondissement of Perpignan. It is situated 4 km (2.5 mi) from the Mediterranean near the Tech River, in Pyrénées-Orientales, 12 km (7.5 mi) from Perpignan and 7 km (4.3 mi) from Argelès.

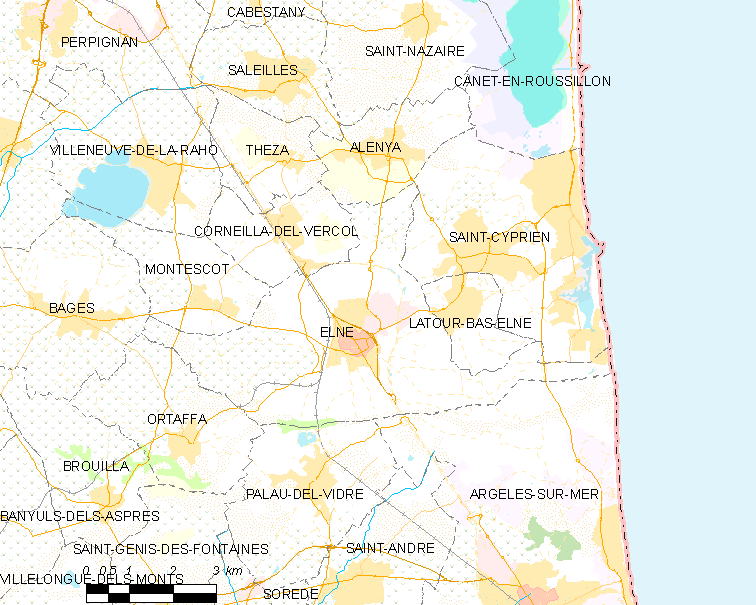
Map of Elne and its surrounding communes

== History ==
Elne, from the heights of its fortified site, dominates the narrow plain of Roussillon between the Pyrenees and the Mediterranean. Numerous archeological researches have shown that the surrounding countryside has been occupied since Neolithic times. Elne was an Iberian oppidum or fortified town. Elne is the oldest town in Roussillon and since it is situated on the way towards the Iberian Peninsula, successive civilisations have left their traces. The first mention of the settlement, under the name of Illiberis, occurs in the history of Livy (xxi.24). It was the Iberian city at which Hannibal pitched camp having crossed the Pyrenees in 218 BCE, where he negotiated with the assembled Gaulish chiefs his safe passage through their territories on the way to Italy. In the first century CE, however, it was no more than "a modest vestige of a hitherto great city" (Pliny).

In the fourth century, Illiberis was renamed "Castrum Helenae" after Helena, the mother of Constantine, whence its modern name was derived by degrees. In 350 A.D., this was the location of the assassination of Constans, a son of Constantine. With the division of southern Gaul in 462, Elne became one of the "seven cities" of Septimania. Its Catholic bishopric was established in the 6th century. The first known bishop of Elne, Dominus, was mentioned in 571 in the Chronicle of John of Biclarum. The bishop of Elne attended the Council of Toledo in 599. Numerous synods were held by the bishops of Elne: That of 1027 in Toulouges upheld the Peace and Truce of God, that no one should attack his enemy from Saturday at nine o'clock to Monday at one. Further synods were held in 1058, 1114, 1335, 1337, 1338, 1339, 1340, and 1380.

When the Arabs crossed the Pyrenees in 719 Elne was one of the first towns to be attacked, and when the counts of Roussillon achieved independence, Perpignan became the capital of the county, with Elne remaining the Episcopal city.

The high altar of the present cathedral of Sainte-Eulalie-et-Sainte-Julie was consecrated in 1069. Its Romanesque cloister was built in the 12th to 14th centuries. In 1285, under the Aragonese domination, during the Aragonese Crusade instigated by Pope Martin IV, the town was plundered, the cathedral set on fire and the people, who had taken refuge inside, massacred by the French troops of Philip III.

During the later Middle Ages, Elne was increasingly overshadowed by the growing prosperity of nearby Perpignan; the counts of Roussillon moved their seat from Elne to Perpignan, and after vicissitudes lasting two centuries the episcopal seat was finally transferred to Perpignan also, in 1601 by a Bull of Pope Clement VIII.

In 1472 the inhabitants of Elne revolted against French rule. The town, yet again besieged, was conquered and its captain, Bernat d'Oms, beheaded (1474). In 1493 Elne, along with all Roussillon, was returned to the Crown of Aragon. In 1641 Elne suffered another siege by the French and after the Treaty of the Pyrenees (1659), became French. The medieval ramparts were partly destroyed in 1680 on Louis XIV's orders.

Since then Elne has become an agricultural town which, in spite of repeated destructions caused by its several invaders, remains a witness to its past glories, attracting some 70,000 visitors annually.

In the twentieth century a sculptor and a painter have left their imprint: Aristide Maillol and Etienne Terrus, to whom a local museum is dedicated. "Pomone" by Maillol serves as the World War II war memorial, and the studio of Terrus, where Henri Matisse and André Derain were received, saw the birth of the Fauvism movement.

Currently the city is extending towards the north, in a carefully planned urbanization— "Las Trillas"— extending over 40 hectares, which takes advantage of picturesque views of the cathedral. A pedestrian boulevard through the city, on the model of Barcelona's successful "Las Ramblas", is under way, as well as a new square, Place Jordi incorporating the ramparts of the upper city.

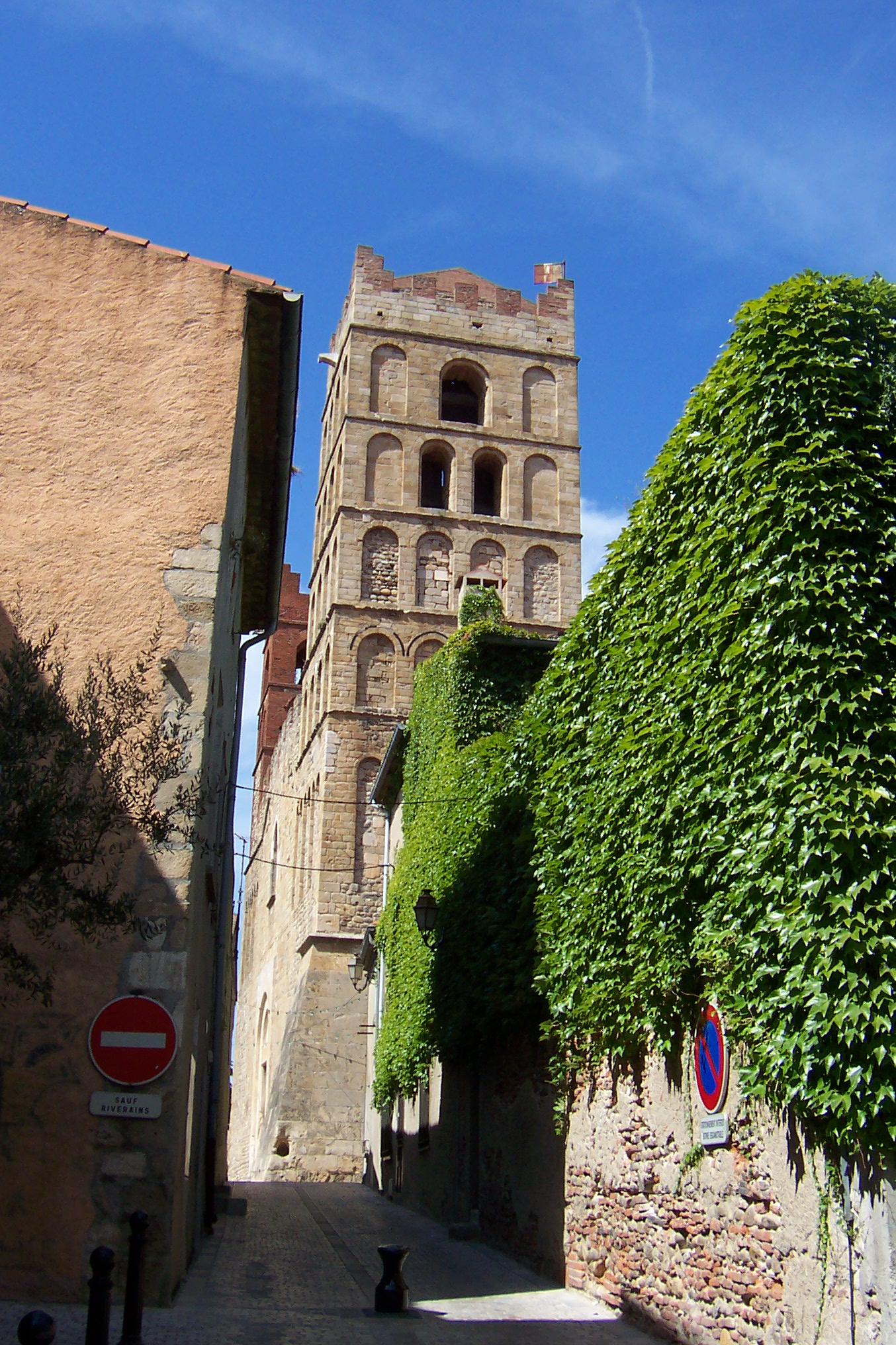
The north bell-tower of the cathedral

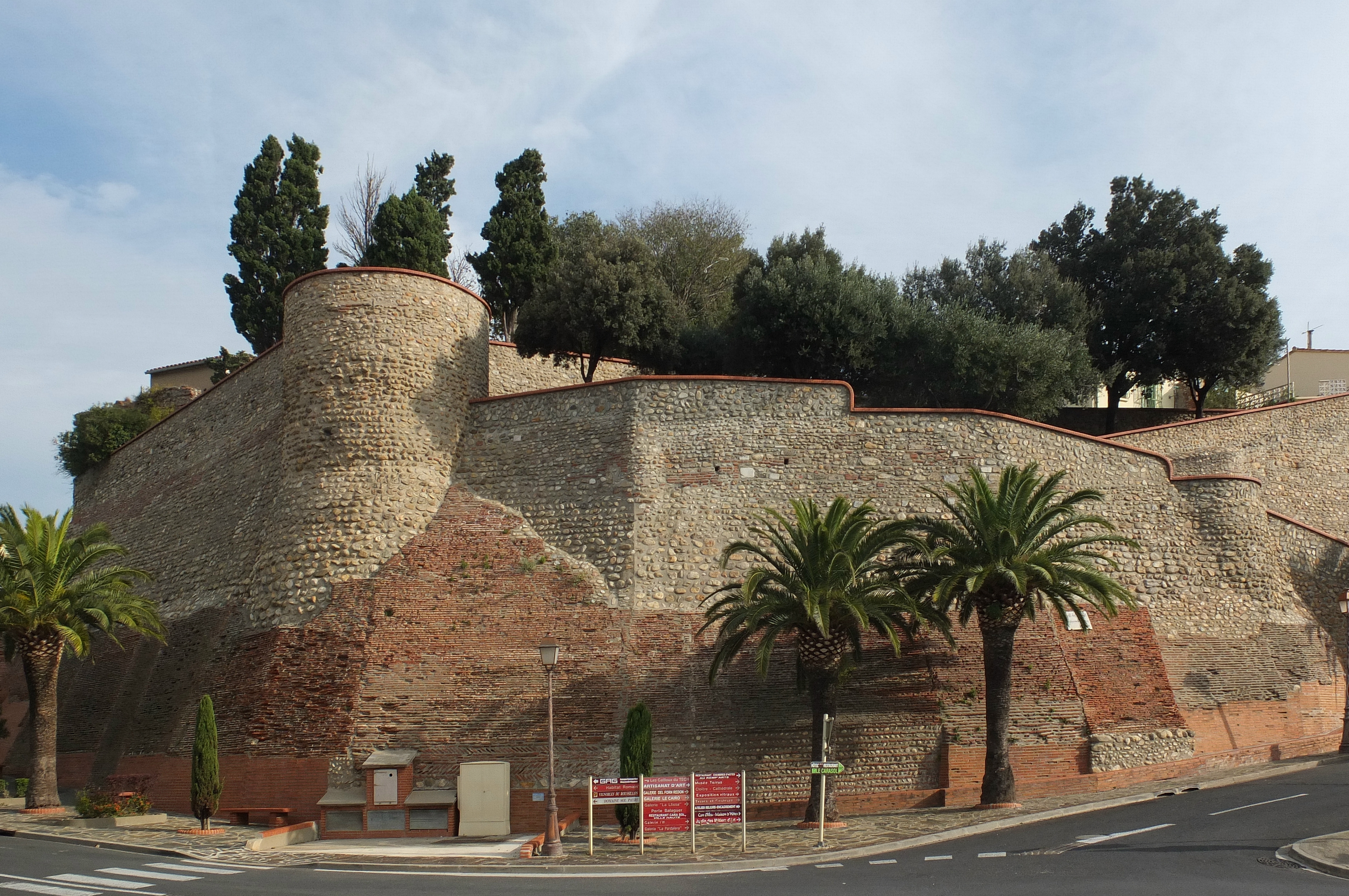
City wall

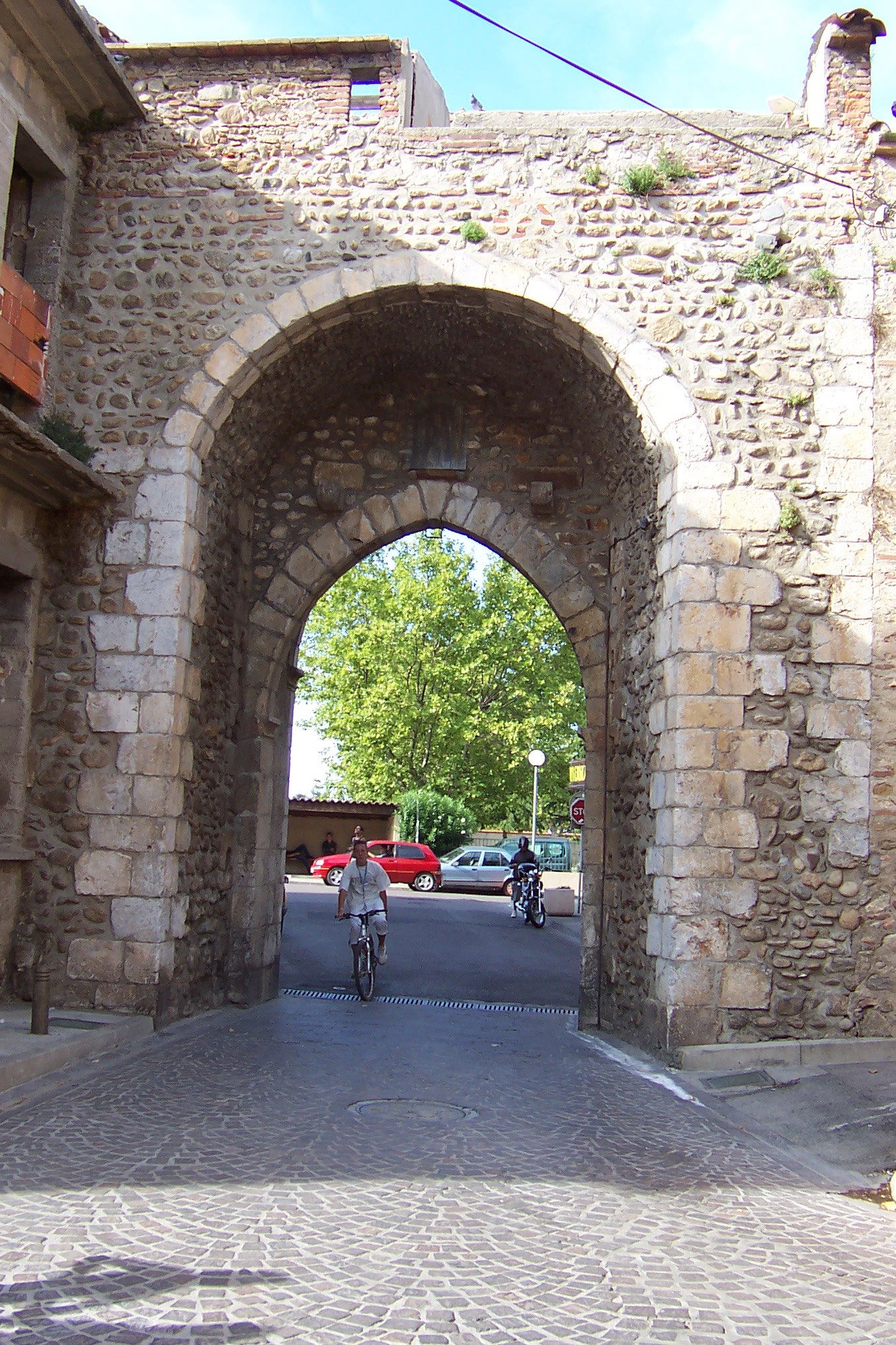
The "Perpignan Gate" leads towards Perpignan

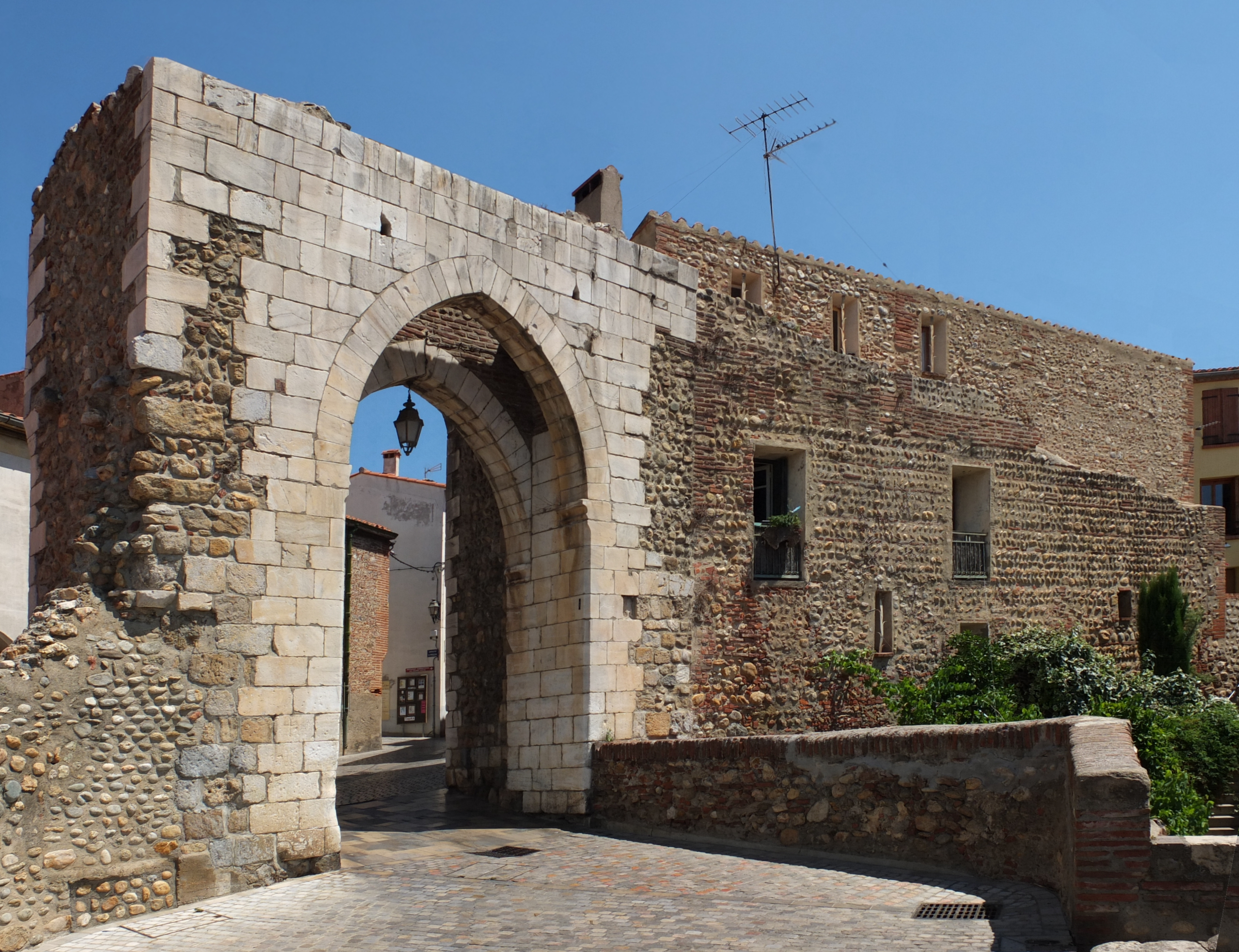
Porte de Balagué, former gate to the upper town

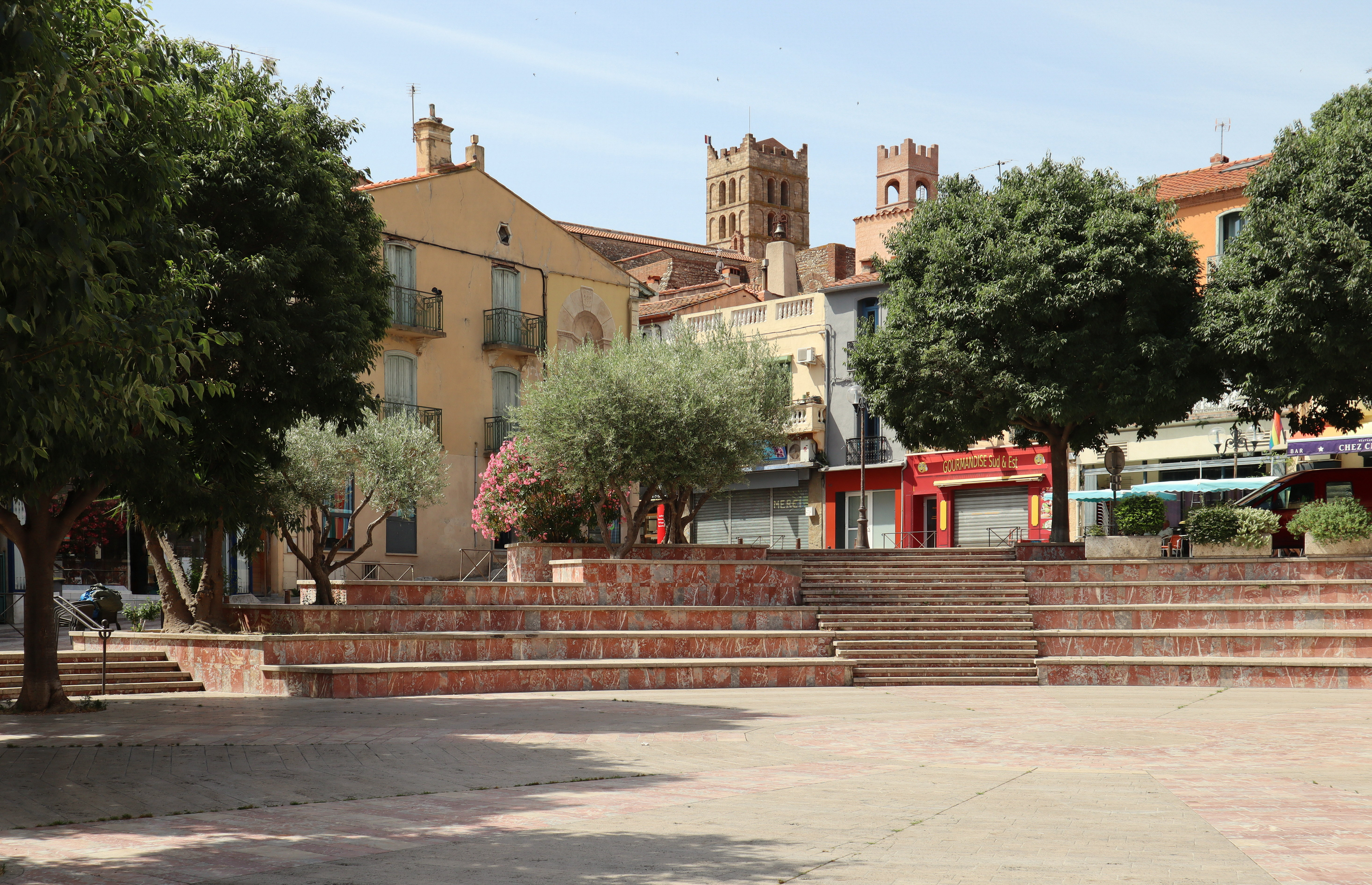
Place de la République

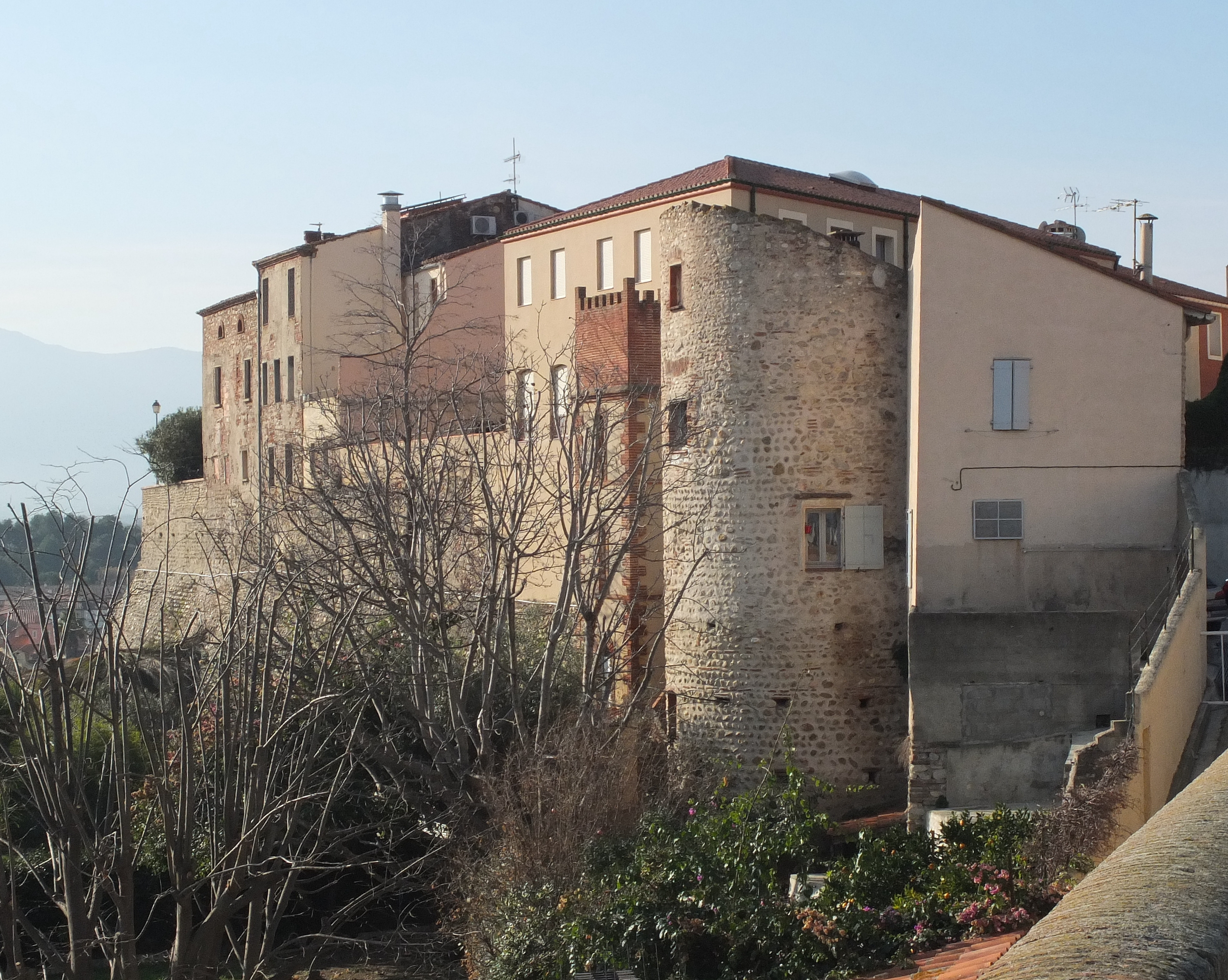
Upper town "Illiberis"

== Demography ==
Historical population
Year	Pop.	±% p.a.
1968	5,892	—
1975	6,017	+0.30%
1982	6,177	+0.38%
1990	6,262	+0.17%
1999	6,410	+0.26%
2007	7,452	+1.90%
2012	8,275	+2.12%
2017	8,941	+1.56%
2023	9,511	+1.04%
Source: INSEE

== See also ==
- Communes of the Pyrénées-Orientales department
