= Corneilla-del-Vercol =

Corneilla-del-Vercol Cornellà del Bèrcol
- Commune
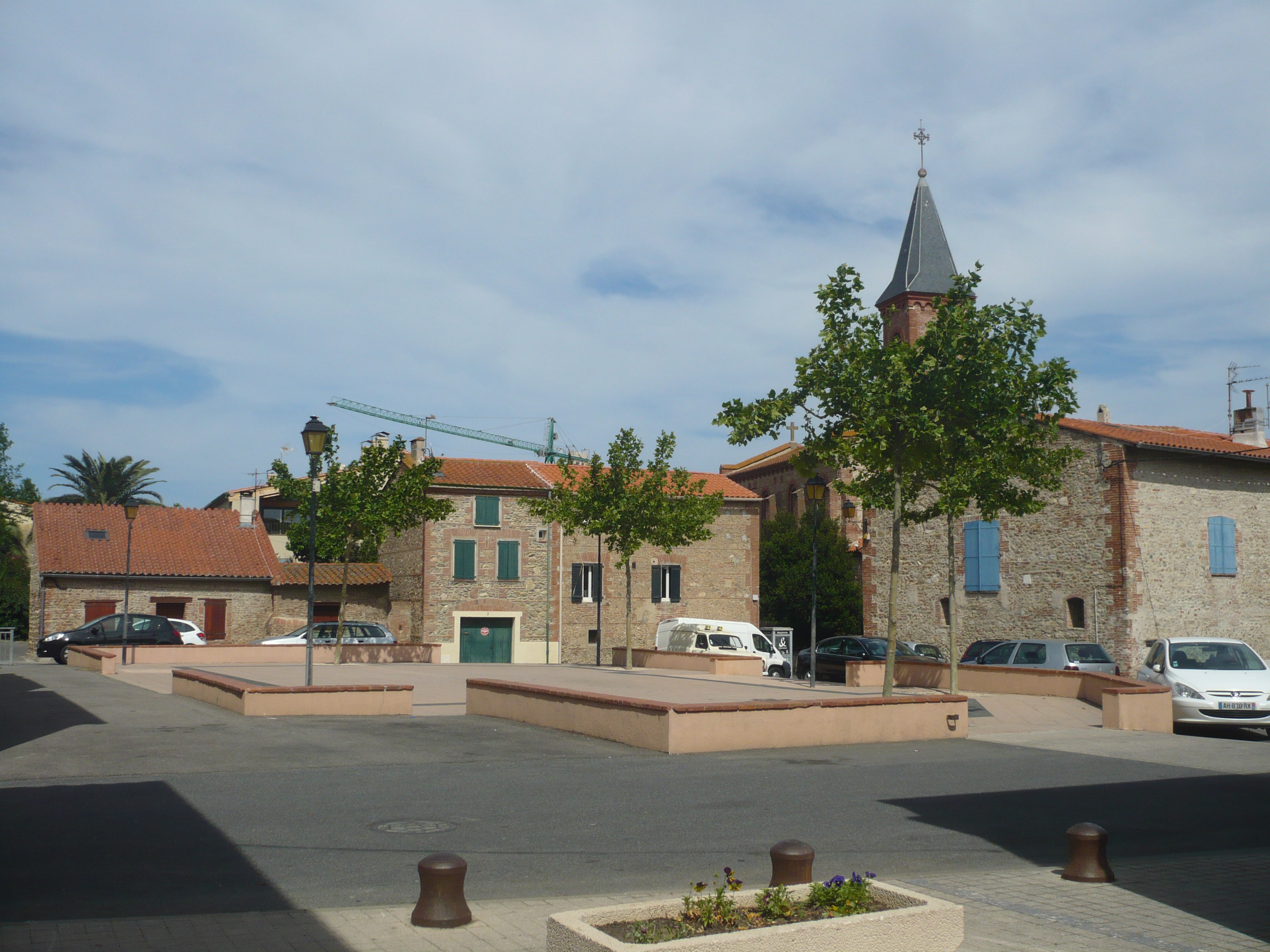
- The village square in Corneilla-del-Vercol

- Coat of arms
- Location of Corneilla-del-Vercol
- Location within France Location within Occitanie
- Coordinates: 42°37′30″N 2°57′07″E
- Country: France
- Region: Occitania
- Department: Pyrénées-Orientales
- Arrondissement: Céret
- Canton: La Plaine d'Illibéris
- Intercommunality: Sud Roussillon

Government
  - Mayor (2020–2026): Christophe Manas
- Area^{1}: 5.43 km^{2} (2.10 sq mi)
- Elevation: 27 m (89 ft)
- Highest elevation: 28 m (92 ft)
- Lowest elevation: 9 m (30 ft)
- Population (2023): 2,696
  - Density: 497/km^{2} (1,290/sq mi)
- Time zone: UTC+01:00 (CET)
  - Summer (DST): UTC+02:00 (CEST)
- INSEE/Postal code: 66059 /66200
- ^{1} French Land Register data, which excludes lakes, ponds, glaciers > 1 km^{2} (0.386 sq mi or 247 acres) and river estuaries.

Corneilla-del-Vercol (French pronunciation: [kɔʁnɛja dɛl vɛʁkɔl]; Catalan: Cornellà del Bercol) is a commune in the Pyrénées-Orientales department in southern France.

== Geography ==
=== Localisation ===
Corneilla-del-Vercol is located in the canton of La Plaine d'Illibéris and in the arrondissement of Perpignan.

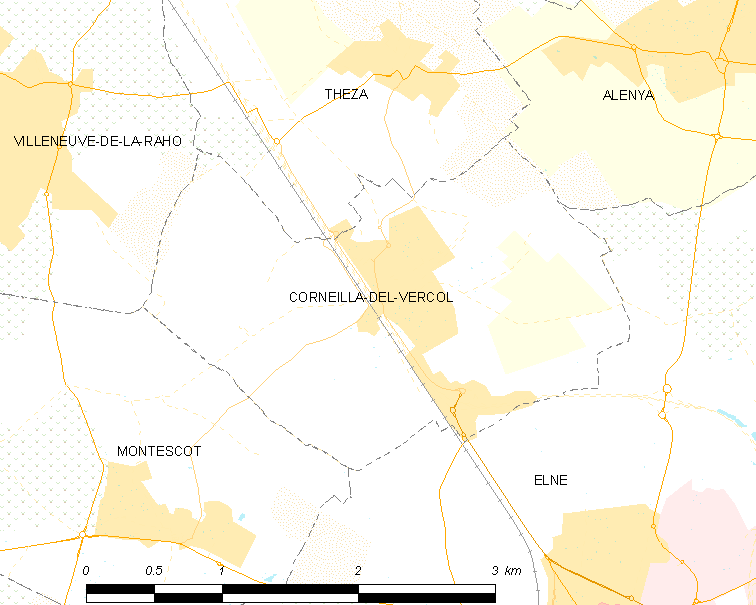
Map of Corneilla-del-Vercol and its surrounding communes

== Population ==
Historical population
Year	Pop.	±% p.a.
1968	633	—
1975	756	+2.57%
1982	965	+3.55%
1990	1,450	+5.22%
1999	1,505	+0.41%
2007	1,964	+3.38%
2012	2,176	+2.07%
2017	2,293	+1.05%
2023	2,696	+2.74%
Source: INSEE

== Notable people ==
- Pierre Jonquères d'Oriola (1920-2011), equestrian born in Corneilla-del-Vercol.

== See also ==
- Communes of the Pyrénées-Orientales department
