= Canton of Saint-Estève =

Coordinates: 42°42′51″N 2°50′34″E

The Canton of Saint-Estève is a former canton of the Pyrénées-Orientales department in Languedoc-Roussillon, France. It had 18,677 inhabitants (2012).

The canton comprised the following communes:

- Baho
- Baixas
- Calce
- Saint-Estève
- Villeneuve-la-Rivière
