= Canton of Canet-en-Roussillon =

Coordinates: 42.6910°N 2.9958°E

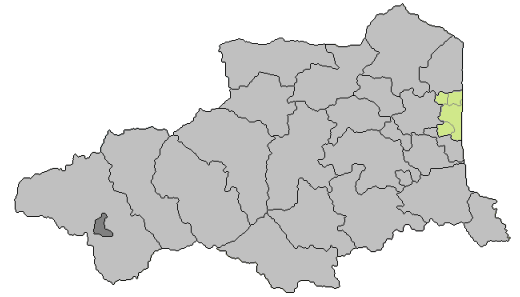
Location of the canton in Pyrénées-Orientales

The Canton of Canet-en-Roussillon is a former French canton of Pyrénées-Orientales department, in Languedoc-Roussillon. It had 23,061 inhabitants (2012). The group was disbanded following the French canton reorganisation which came into effect in March 2015.

== Composition ==
The canton of Canet-en-Roussillon comprised 4 communes:

- Canet-en-Roussillon
- Sainte-Marie
- Saint-Nazaire
- Villelongue-de-la-Salanque
