= Calce =

Calce may refer to:

== People ==
- Giacinto della Calce (1649–1715), Italian bishop
- Michael Calce (born 1984), Canadian hacker

== Places ==
- Calce, Pyrénées-Orientales, France

== Other ==
- Center for Advanced Life Cycle Engineering
