= Canton of Le Ribéral =

Canton of France

Coordinates: 42°42′51″N 2°50′34″E

The Canton of Le Ribéral is a French canton of Pyrénées-Orientales department, in Occitania. At the French canton re-organisation which came into effect in March 2015, the canton was created including five communes from the canton of Saint-Estève, one from the canton of Millas and one from the canton of Rivesaltes.

== Composition ==
- Baho
- Baixas
- Calce
- Peyrestortes
- Pézilla-la-Rivière
- Saint-Estève
- Villeneuve-la-Rivière
