= Toulouges =

- Commune
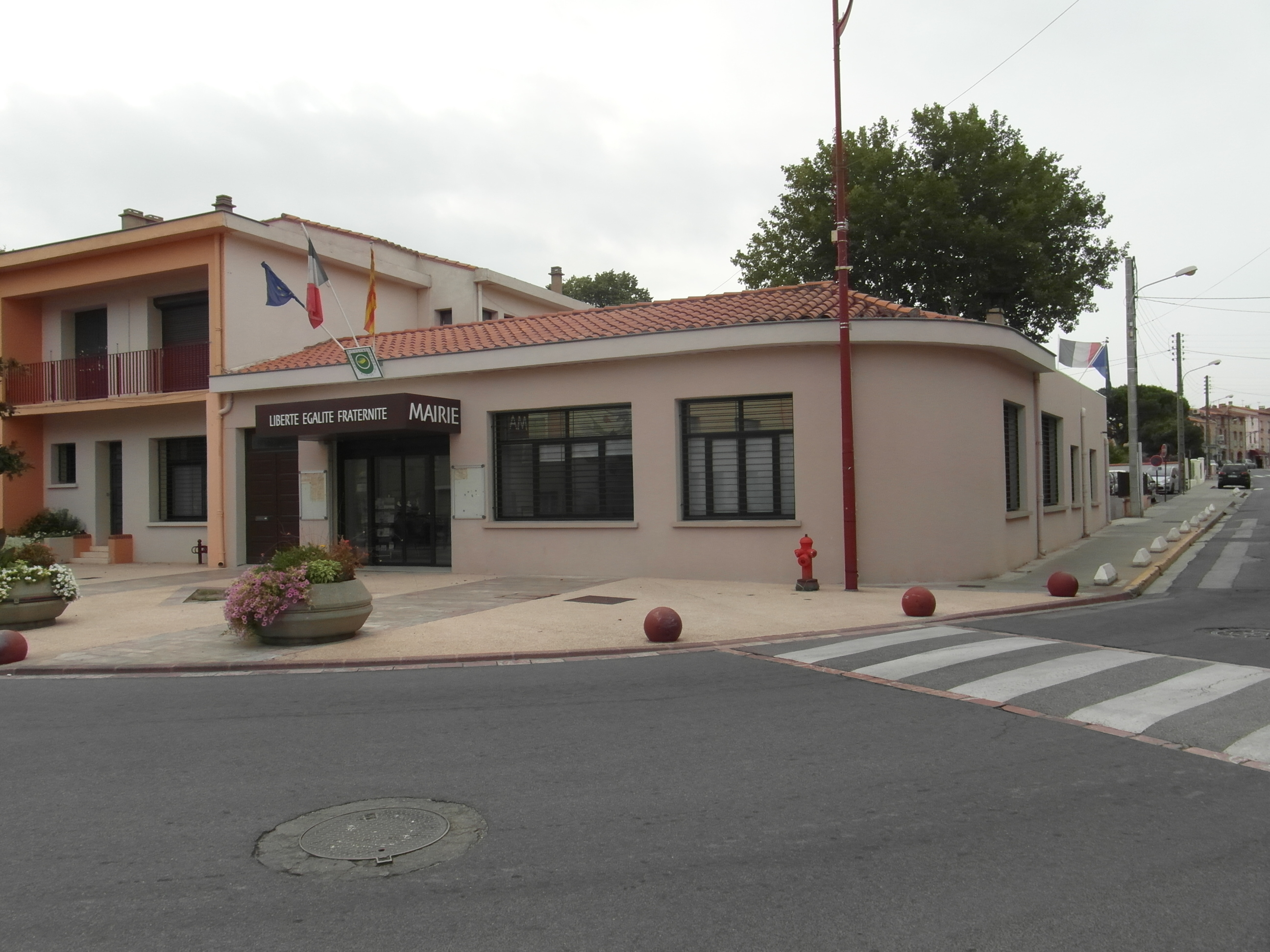
- The town hall in Toulouges

- Coat of arms
- Location of Toulouges
- Location within France Location within Occitanie
- Coordinates: 42°40′18″N 2°49′58″E
- Country: France
- Region: Occitania
- Department: Pyrénées-Orientales
- Arrondissement: Perpignan
- Canton: Perpignan-6
- Intercommunality: Perpignan Méditerranée Métropole

Government
  - Mayor (2020–2026): Nicolas Barthe
- Area^{1}: 8.04 km^{2} (3.10 sq mi)
- Highest elevation: 82 m (269 ft)
- Lowest elevation: 50 m (160 ft)
- Population (2023): 7,450
  - Density: 927/km^{2} (2,400/sq mi)
- Time zone: UTC+01:00 (CET)
  - Summer (DST): UTC+02:00 (CEST)
- INSEE/Postal code: 66213 /66350
- ^{1} French Land Register data, which excludes lakes, ponds, glaciers > 1 km^{2} (0.386 sq mi or 247 acres) and river estuaries.

Toulouges (French pronunciation: [tuluʒ]; Catalan: Toluges, [tuˈluʒəs]) is a commune in the Pyrénées-Orientales department in southern France.

== Geography ==
Toulouges is located between Thuir and Perpignan, in the canton of Perpignan-6 and in the arrondissement of Perpignan.

The town covers an area of 8.04 km^{2} (3.10 sq mi), with 669 inhabitants per km^{2}. Toulouges borders the following municipalities: Perpignan, Canohès, Thuir, El Soler, and Baho.

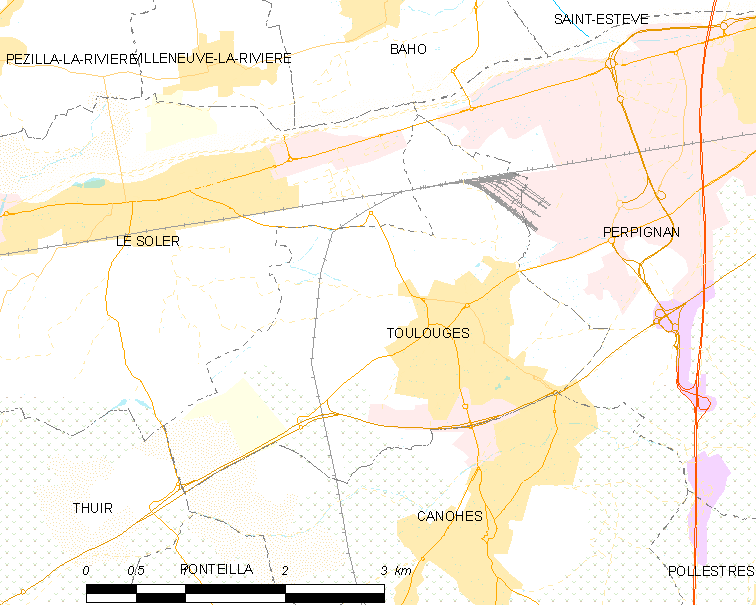
Map of Toulouges and its surrounding communes

== History ==
Toulouges probably grew upon a Roman villa. It was first mentioned in 904 at the same time mentioning the church called Tulogias. Other names that are presumably Toulouges are Tologis (in a 937 document), Tulujes (1027), Tuluges (1030), Toluges (1119).

Toulouges hosted an ecumenical council known as the Council of Elge-Toulouges in 1027. It aimed to promote peace among the feudal lords of France by declaring the Truce of God, attempting to limit the days of the week and times of year that the nobility could engage in violence.

During the 14th and 15th centuries Toulouges grew rapidly. A wall and hospital were in existence. In 1628, however, part of the population was killed by a plague. Today, though, Toulouges is again growing rapidly.

== Demography ==
Historical population
Year	Pop.	±% p.a.
1968	2,117	—
1975	2,868	+4.43%
1982	3,637	+3.45%
1990	4,955	+3.94%
1999	5,396	+0.95%
2007	5,837	+0.99%
2012	6,398	+1.85%
2017	6,881	+1.47%
2023	7,450	+1.33%
Source: INSEE

== See also ==
- Communes of the Pyrénées-Orientales department
