= Saleilles =

Saleilles Salelles
- Commune
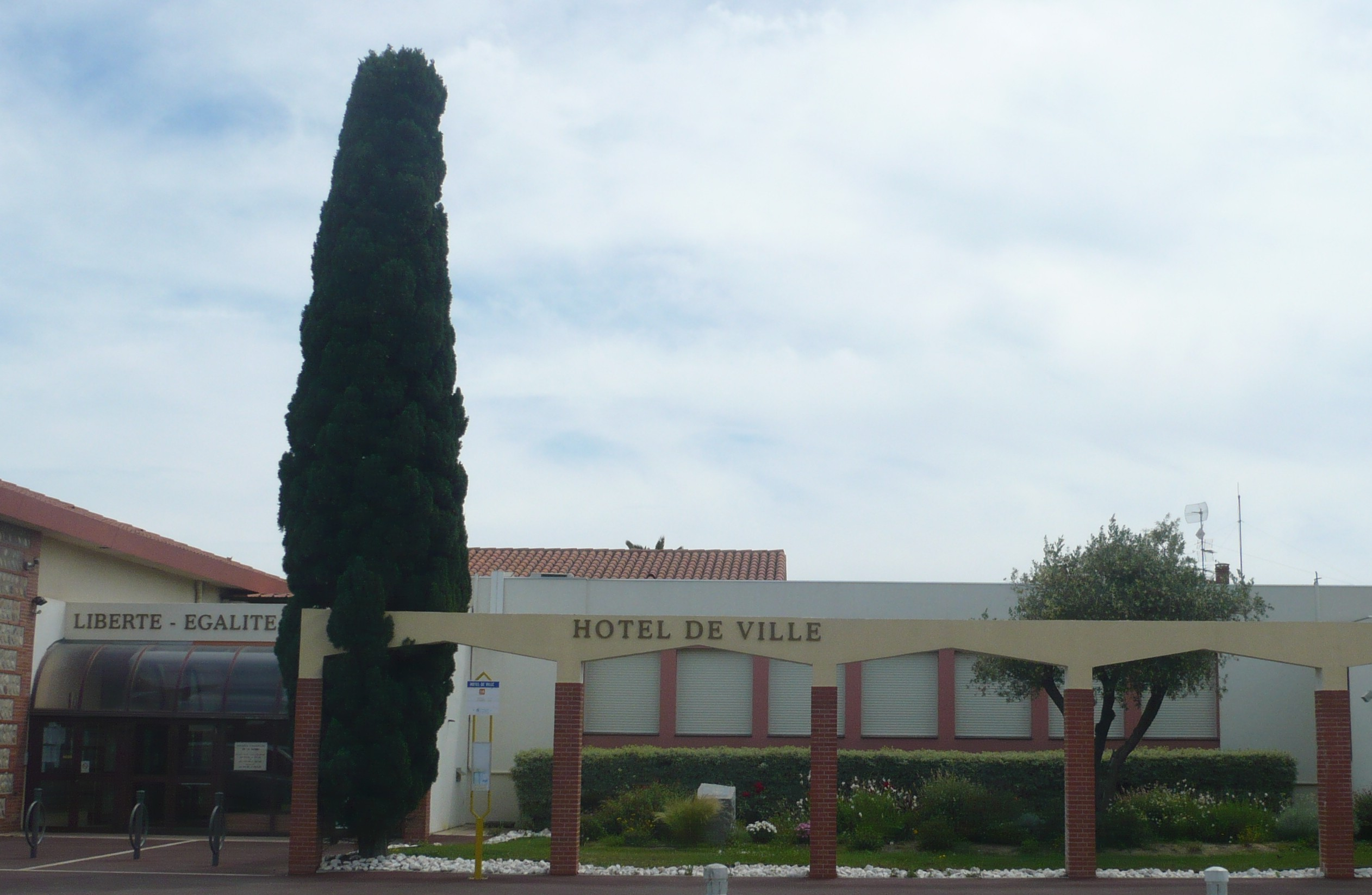
- The town hall in Saleilles
- Location of Saleilles
- Location within France Location within Occitanie
- Coordinates: 42°39′19″N 2°57′09″E
- Country: France
- Region: Occitania
- Department: Pyrénées-Orientales
- Arrondissement: Perpignan
- Canton: La Côte Sableuse
- Intercommunality: Perpignan Méditerranée Métropole

Government
  - Mayor (2020–2026): François Rallo
- Area^{1}: 6.12 km^{2} (2.36 sq mi)
- Elevation: 17 m (56 ft)
- Highest elevation: 29 m (95 ft)
- Lowest elevation: 8 m (26 ft)
- Population (2023): 5,698
  - Density: 931/km^{2} (2,410/sq mi)
- Time zone: UTC+01:00 (CET)
  - Summer (DST): UTC+02:00 (CEST)
- INSEE/Postal code: 66189 /66280
- ^{1} French Land Register data, which excludes lakes, ponds, glaciers > 1 km^{2} (0.386 sq mi or 247 acres) and river estuaries.

Saleilles (French pronunciation: [salɛj]; Catalan: Salelles) is a commune in the Pyrénées-Orientales department in southern France.

== Geography ==
Saleilles is located in the canton of La Côte Sableuse and in the arrondissement of Perpignan.

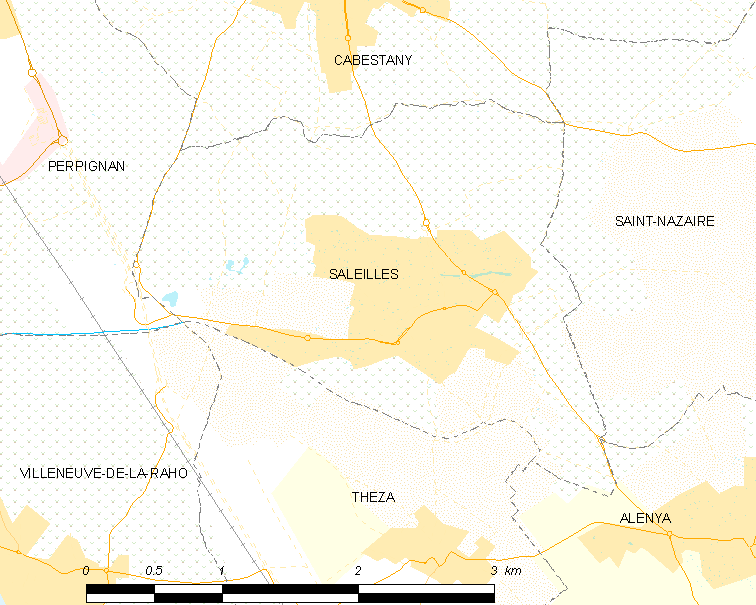
Map of Saleilles and its surrounding communes

== History ==
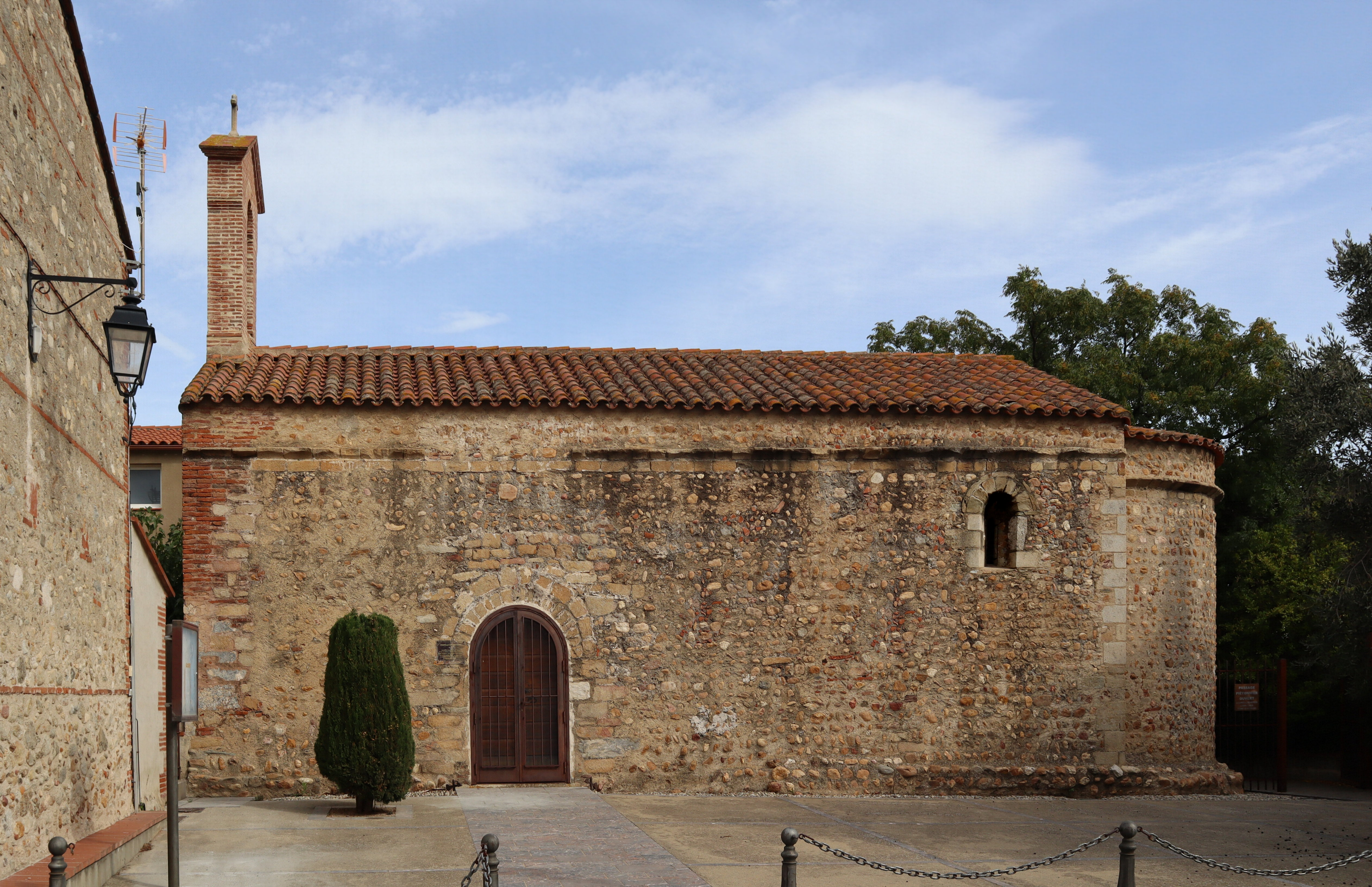
Chapel Saint-Étienne (11th century)

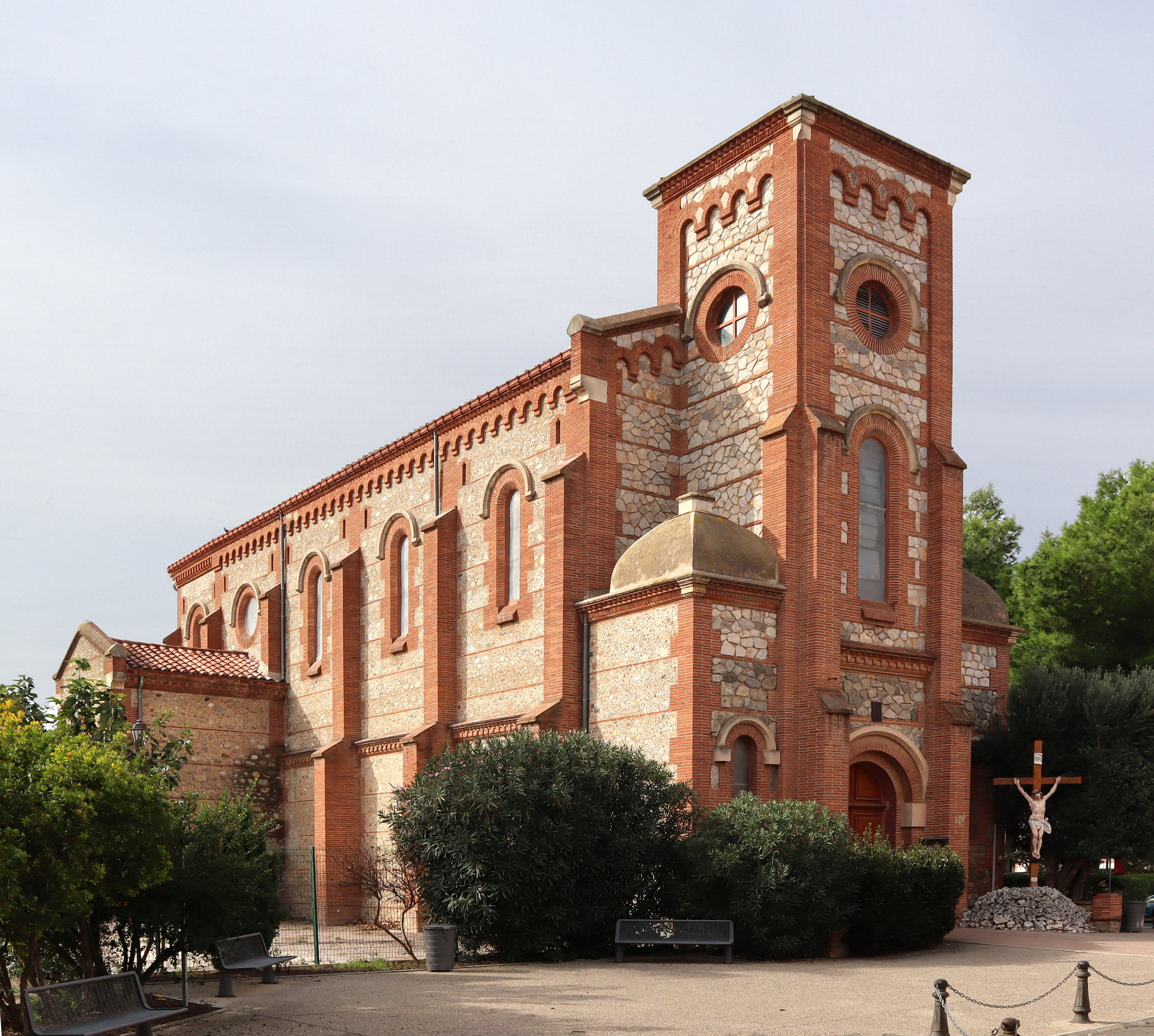
Parish church Saint-Étienne (northeast view)

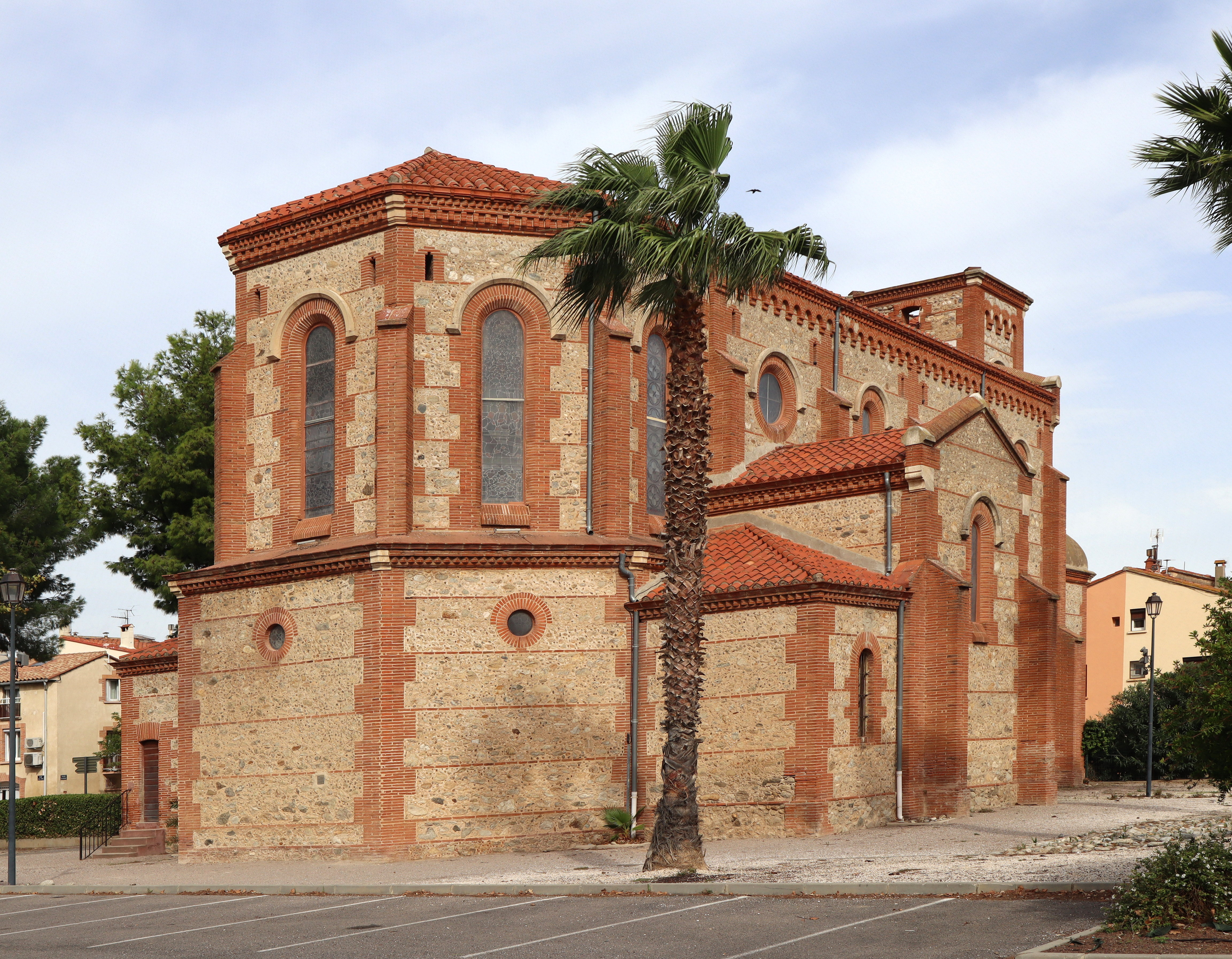
Parish church Saint-Étienne (southeast view)

== Government and politics ==
=== Mayors ===
Mayor	Term start	Term end
Jean-Michel Erre	1995	2008
François Rallo	2008	

== Population ==
Historical population
Year	Pop.	±% p.a.
1968	503	—
1975	1,280	+14.27%
1982	2,310	+8.80%
1990	3,293	+4.53%
1999	3,879	+1.84%
2007	4,354	+1.45%
2012	4,680	+1.45%
2017	5,282	+2.45%
2023	5,698	+1.27%
Source: INSEE

== Notable people ==
- Mathieu Madénian (1976-): humorist, actor and columnist who grew up in Saleilles.

== See also ==
- Communes of the Pyrénées-Orientales department
