= Saint-Cyprien, Pyrénées-Orientales =

Saint-Cyprien Sant Cebrià de Rosselló
- Commune
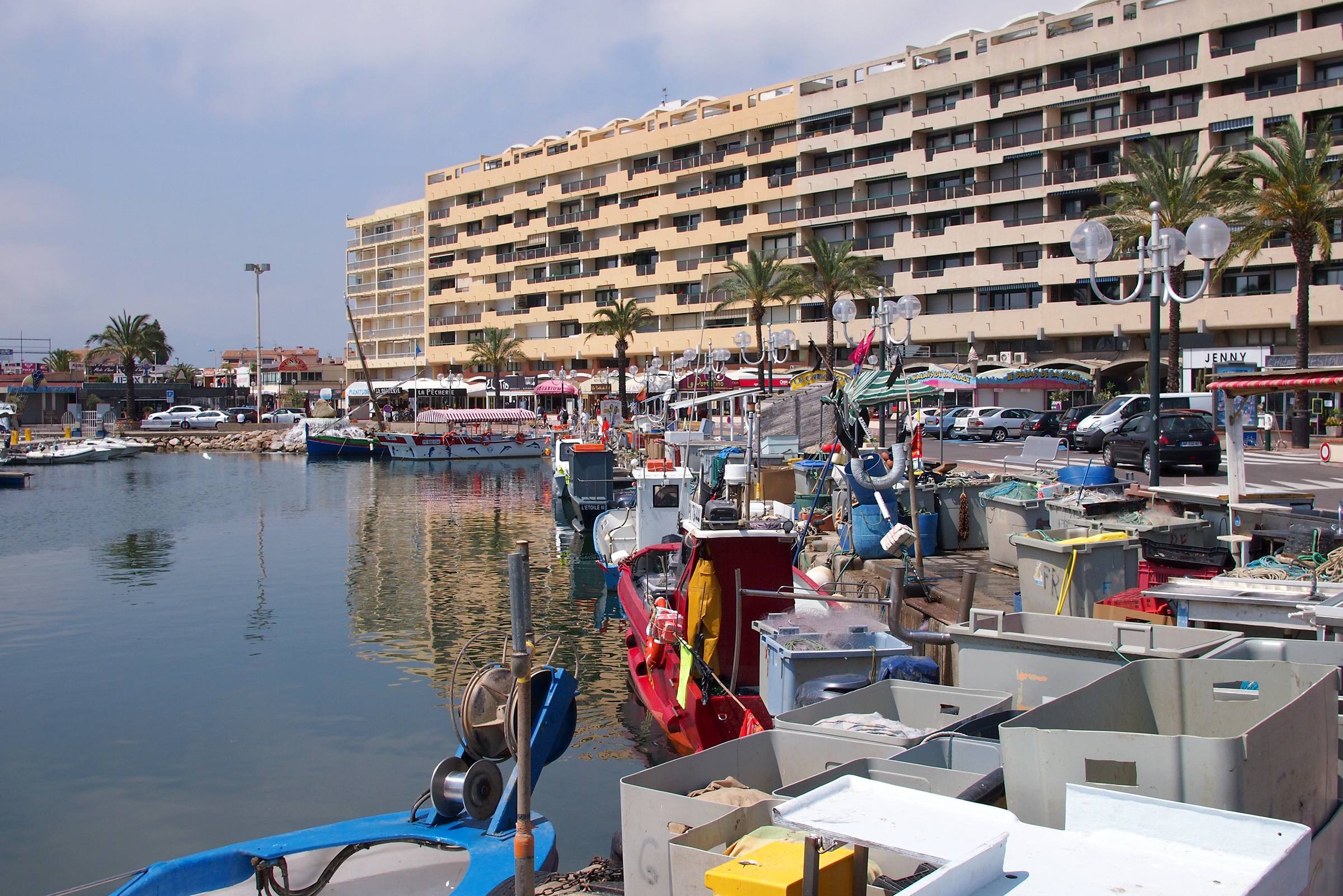
- The harbour in Saint-Cyprien

- Coat of arms
- Location of Saint-Cyprien
- Location within France Location within Occitanie
- Coordinates: 42°37′08″N 3°00′25″E
- Country: France
- Region: Occitania
- Department: Pyrénées-Orientales
- Arrondissement: Céret
- Canton: La Côte Sableuse
- Intercommunality: Sud Roussillon

Government
  - Mayor (2020–2026): Thierry Del Poso (LR)
- Area^{1}: 15.80 km^{2} (6.10 sq mi)
- Elevation: 4 m (13 ft)
- Highest elevation: 29 m (95 ft)
- Lowest elevation: 0 m (0 ft)
- Population (2023): 12,068
  - Density: 763.8/km^{2} (1,978/sq mi)
- Time zone: UTC+01:00 (CET)
  - Summer (DST): UTC+02:00 (CEST)
- INSEE/Postal code: 66171 /66750
- ^{1} French Land Register data, which excludes lakes, ponds, glaciers > 1 km^{2} (0.386 sq mi or 247 acres) and river estuaries.

Saint-Cyprien (French pronunciation: [sɛ̃ sipʁijɛ̃]; Catalan: Sant Cebrià de Rosselló) is a commune in the Pyrénées-Orientales department in southern France.

== Geography ==
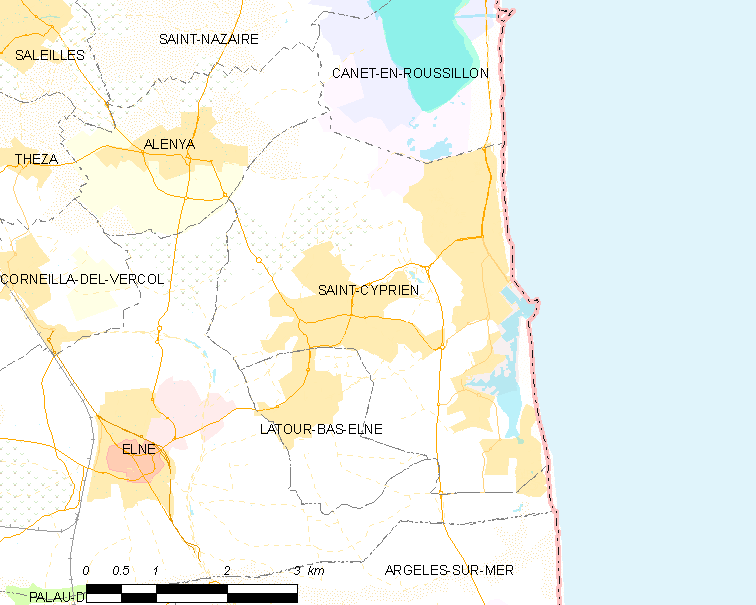
Map of Saint-Cyprien and its surrounding communes

== History ==
Saint-Cyprien was the site of a camp housing some 70,000 Republican escapees from Spain at the end of the Spanish Civil War. They were held in very poor conditions, in open spaces enclosed by barbed wire, from which they were not allowed to leave.

== Government and politics ==
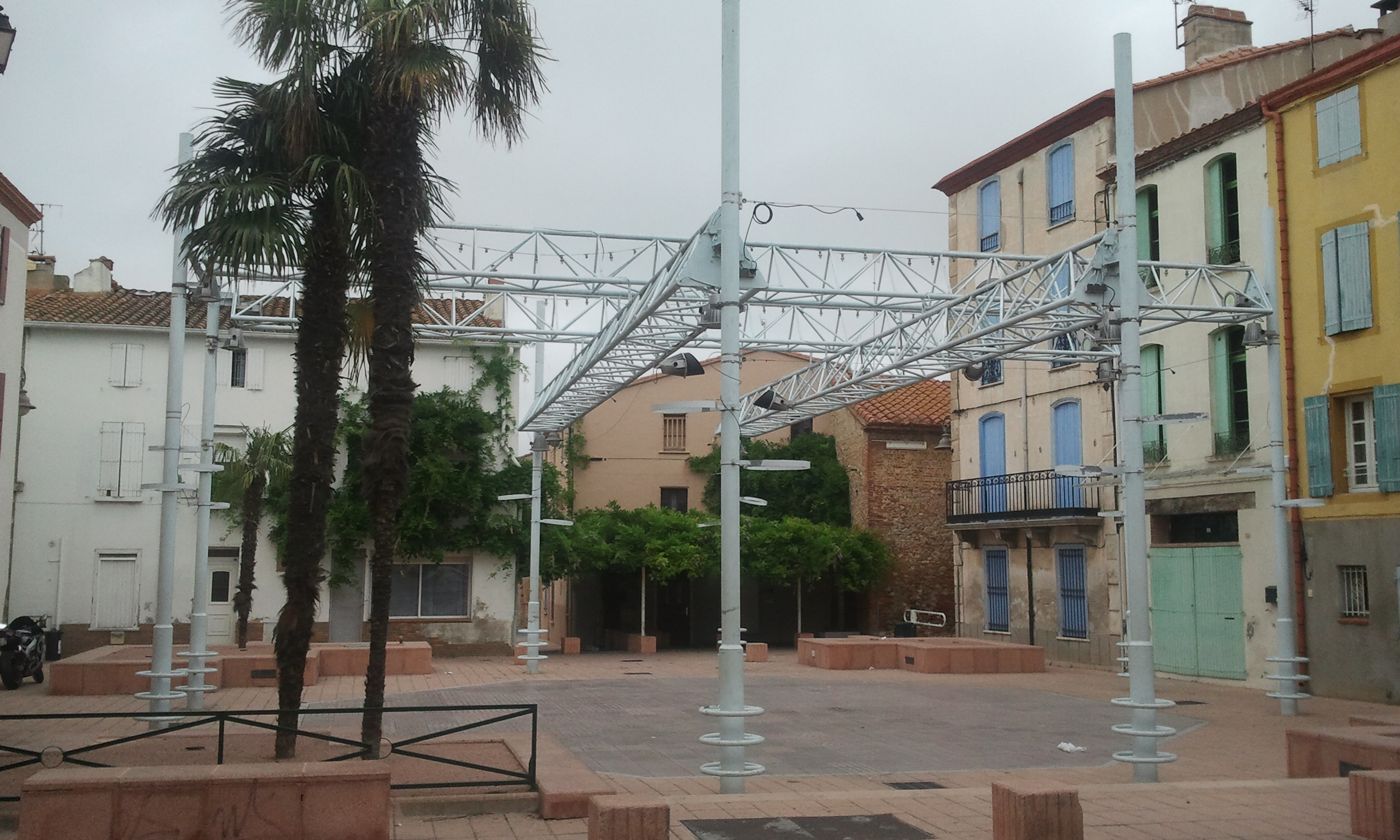
Place de la République

=== Mayors ===
Mayor	Term start	Term end
Pierre Escaro	March 1945	October 1956
Jean Olibo	October 1956	March 1989
Jacques Bouille	March 1989	May 24, 2009
Pierre Fontvieille	June 2, 2009	June 12, 2009
Thierry Del Poso	September 2009	

== Population and society ==
=== Population ===
Historical population
Year	Pop.	±% p.a.
1968	2,592	—
1975	3,012	+2.17%
1982	4,405	+5.58%
1990	6,892	+5.75%
1999	8,573	+2.45%
2007	10,345	+2.38%
2012	10,552	+0.40%
2017	10,511	−0.08%
2023	12,068	+2.33%
Source: INSEE

=== Sports ===
The main spectator sport in the town is Rugby league, while surfing, snorkeling and boat racing are also popular.

== See also ==
- Communes of the Pyrénées-Orientales department
