= Canton of La Côte Sableuse =

French administrative division

Coordinates: 42.70°N 3.01°E

The canton of La Côte Sableuse is an administrative division of the Pyrénées-Orientales department, in southern France. It was created at the French canton reorganisation which came into effect in March 2015. Its seat is in Canet-en-Roussillon.

It consists of the following communes:

1. Canet-en-Roussillon
2. Saint-Cyprien
3. Saint-Nazaire
4. Saleilles
