= Perpignan Méditerranée Métropole =

Coordinates: 42.70°N 2.89°E

- Communauté urbaine
- Location within the Pyrénées-Orientales department
- Country: France
- Region: Occitania
- Department: Pyrénées-Orientales
- No. of communes: {{{nbcomm}}}
- Established: 2016
- Area: 628.6 km^{2} (242.7 sq mi)
- Population (2018): 268,445
  - Density: 427.1/km^{2} (1,106/sq mi)
- Website: www.perpignanmediterraneemetropole.fr

The Perpignan Méditerranée Métropole is the communauté urbaine, an intercommunal structure, centred on the city of Perpignan. It is located in the Pyrénées-Orientales department, in the Occitanie region, southern France. It was created in January 2016, replacing the previous communauté d'agglomération Perpignan Méditerranée. Its area is 628.6 km^{2}. Its population was 268,445 in 2018, of which 119,188 in Perpignan proper.

== Composition ==
Perpignan Méditerranée Métropole consists of the following 36 communes:

1. Baho
2. Baixas
3. Le Barcarès
4. Bompas
5. Cabestany
6. Calce
7. Canet-en-Roussillon
8. Canohès
9. Cases-de-Pène
10. Cassagnes
11. Corneilla-la-Rivière
12. Espira-de-l'Agly
13. Estagel
14. Llupia
15. Montner
16. Opoul-Périllos
17. Perpignan
18. Peyrestortes
19. Pézilla-la-Rivière
20. Pollestres
21. Ponteilla
22. Rivesaltes
23. Sainte-Marie
24. Saint-Estève
25. Saint-Féliu-d'Avall
26. Saint-Hippolyte
27. Saint-Laurent-de-la-Salanque
28. Saint-Nazaire
29. Saleilles
30. Le Soler
31. Tautavel
32. Torreilles
33. Toulouges
34. Villelongue-de-la-Salanque
35. Villeneuve-de-la-Raho
36. Villeneuve-la-Rivière
37. Vingrau

== See also ==
- List of intercommunalities of the Pyrénées-Orientales department
