= Bompas, Pyrénées-Orientales =

Bompas Bompàs (Catalan)
- Commune
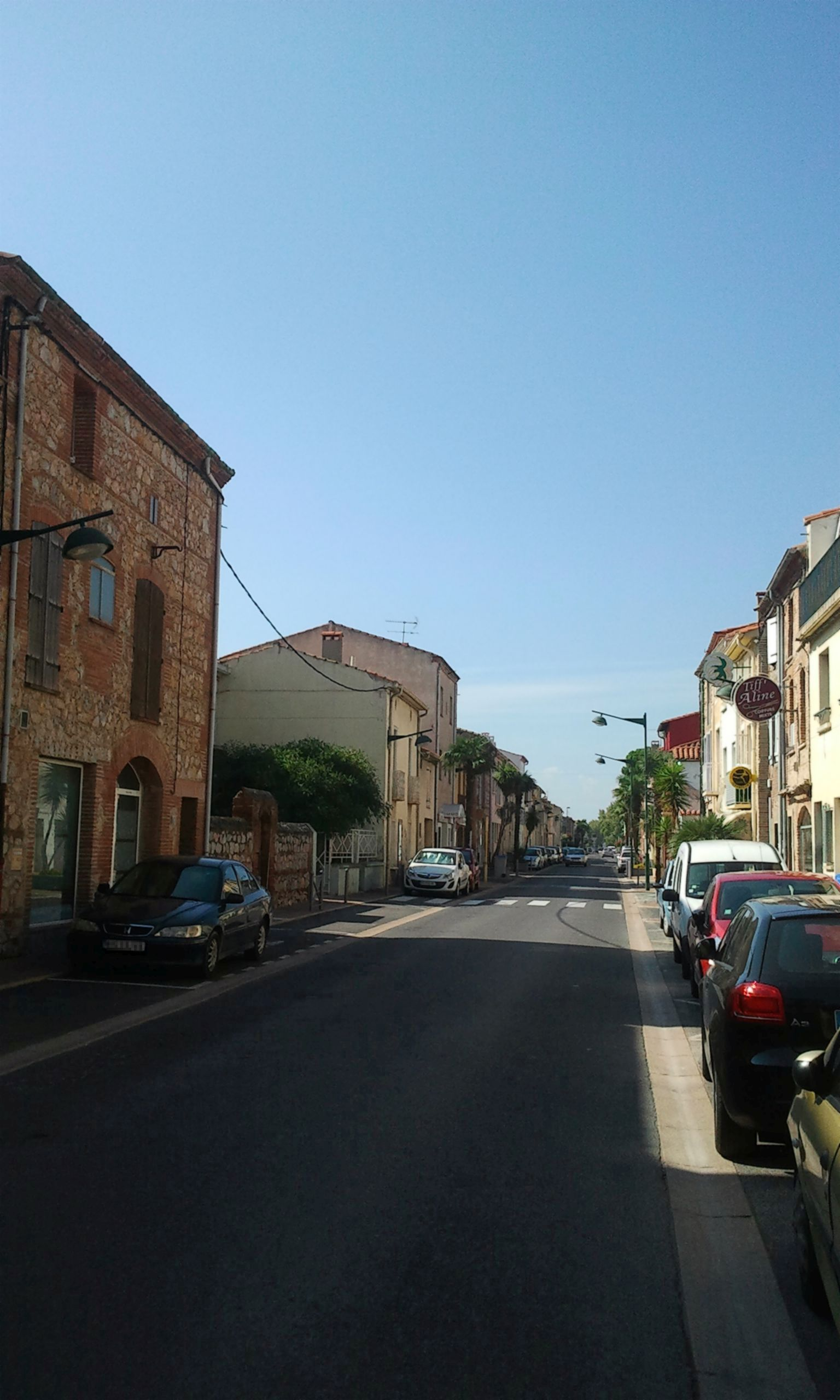
- Haut-Vernet avenue in downtown Bompas

- Coat of arms
- Location of Bompas
- Location within France Location within Occitanie
- Coordinates: 42°43′56″N 2°56′02″E
- Country: France
- Region: Occitania
- Department: Pyrénées-Orientales
- Arrondissement: Perpignan
- Canton: Perpignan-2
- Intercommunality: Perpignan Méditerranée Métropole

Government
  - Mayor (2026–32): Laurence Senent-Ausina
- Area^{1}: 5.70 km^{2} (2.20 sq mi)
- Elevation: 16 m (52 ft)
- Highest elevation: 20 m (66 ft)
- Lowest elevation: 9 m (30 ft)
- Population (2023): 7,832
  - Density: 1,370/km^{2} (3,560/sq mi)
- Demonym(s): bompassencq (fr) bompasenc (ca)
- Time zone: UTC+01:00 (CET)
  - Summer (DST): UTC+02:00 (CEST)
- INSEE/Postal code: 66021 /66430
- ^{1} French Land Register data, which excludes lakes, ponds, glaciers > 1 km^{2} (0.386 sq mi or 247 acres) and river estuaries.

Bompas (French pronunciation: [bɔ̃pas]; Catalan: Bompàs [bumˈpas]) is a commune in the Pyrénées-Orientales department in southern France.

== Geography ==
=== Localisation ===
Bompas is located in the canton of Perpignan-2 and in the arrondissement of Perpignan.

It is part of the Northern Catalan comarca of Rosselló.

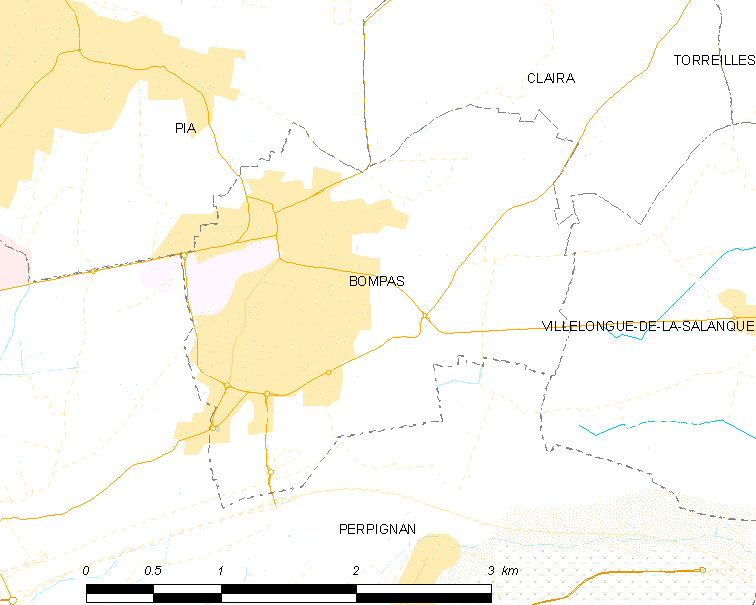
Map of Bompas and its surrounding communes

== Government and politics ==
=== Mayors ===
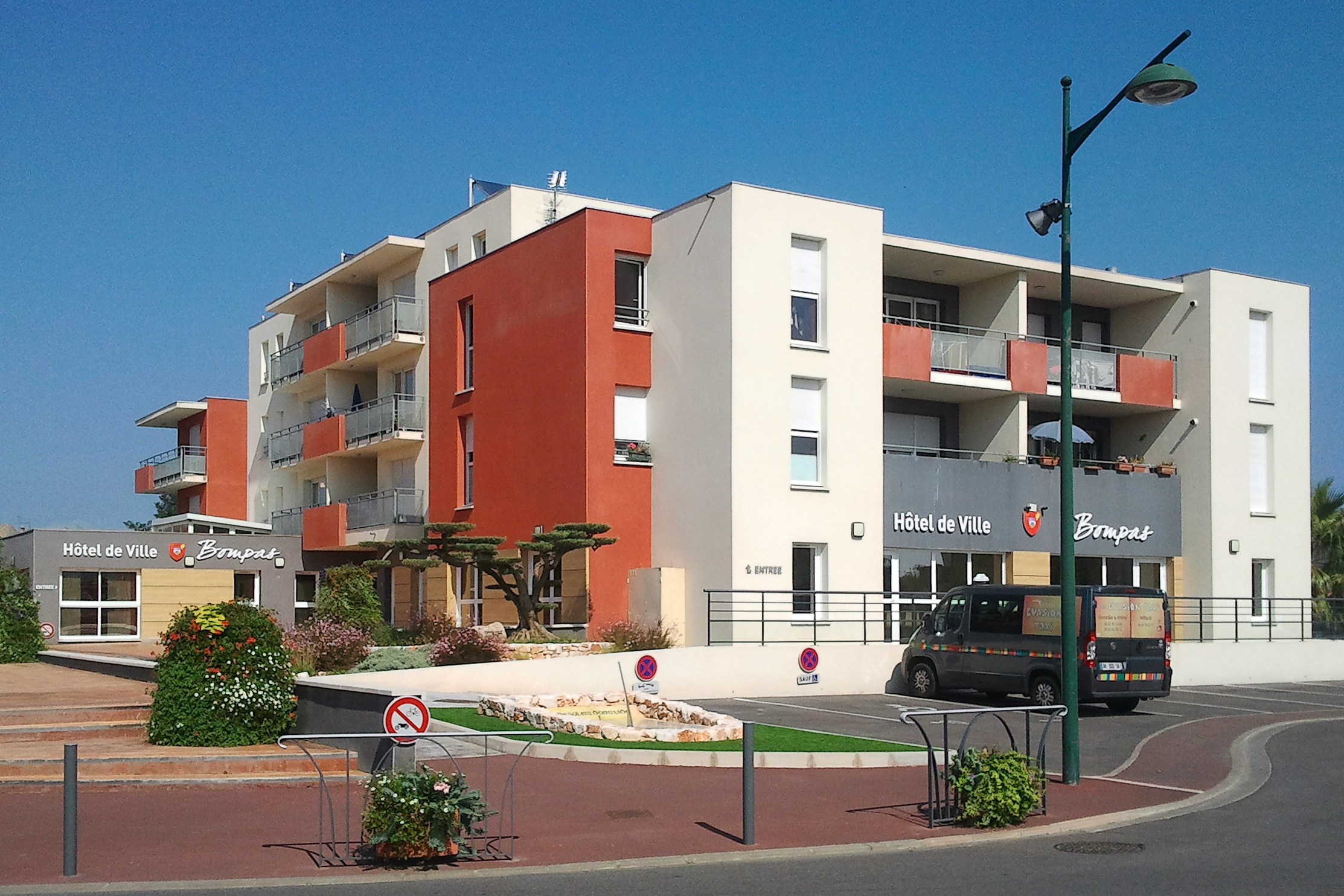
The town hall

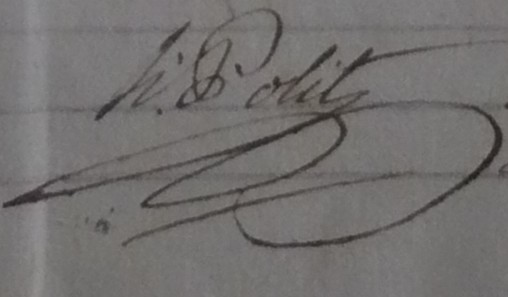
Signature of mayor Honoré Polit in 1815

| Mayor | Term start | Term end |
|---|---|---|
| Honoré Polit | ? | May 1815 |
| Jacques Reyner | May 1815 | ? |
| Louis Cazalens | 1900 | 1906 |
| Thomas Batlle-Foxonet | 1906 | 1908 |
| Joseph Batlle | 1908 | 1912 |
| Lucien Reynès | 1912 | 1935 |
| Jean Polit | 1935 | 1944 |
| Edmond Torreilles | 1944 | 1945 |
| David Vidal | 1945 | 1971 |
| Gabriel Sola | 1971 | 1989 |
| Yves Mir | 1989 | 1995 |
| Jean-Paul Batlle | 1995 | 26.01.2020 (death) |
| Laurence Ausina | 24.05.2020 | |

== Population ==
Historical population
| Year | Pop. | ±% p.a. |
|---|---|---|
| 1968 | 1,693 | — |
| 1975 | 1,951 | +2.05% |
| 1982 | 4,670 | +13.28% |
| 1990 | 6,323 | +3.86% |
| 1999 | 6,944 | +1.05% |
| 2007 | 7,149 | +0.36% |
| 2012 | 7,129 | −0.06% |
| 2017 | 7,254 | +0.35% |
| 2023 | 7,832 | +1.29% |
Source: INSEE

== See also ==
- Communes of the Pyrénées-Orientales department
