= Peyrestortes =

Peyrestortes Paretstortes
- Commune
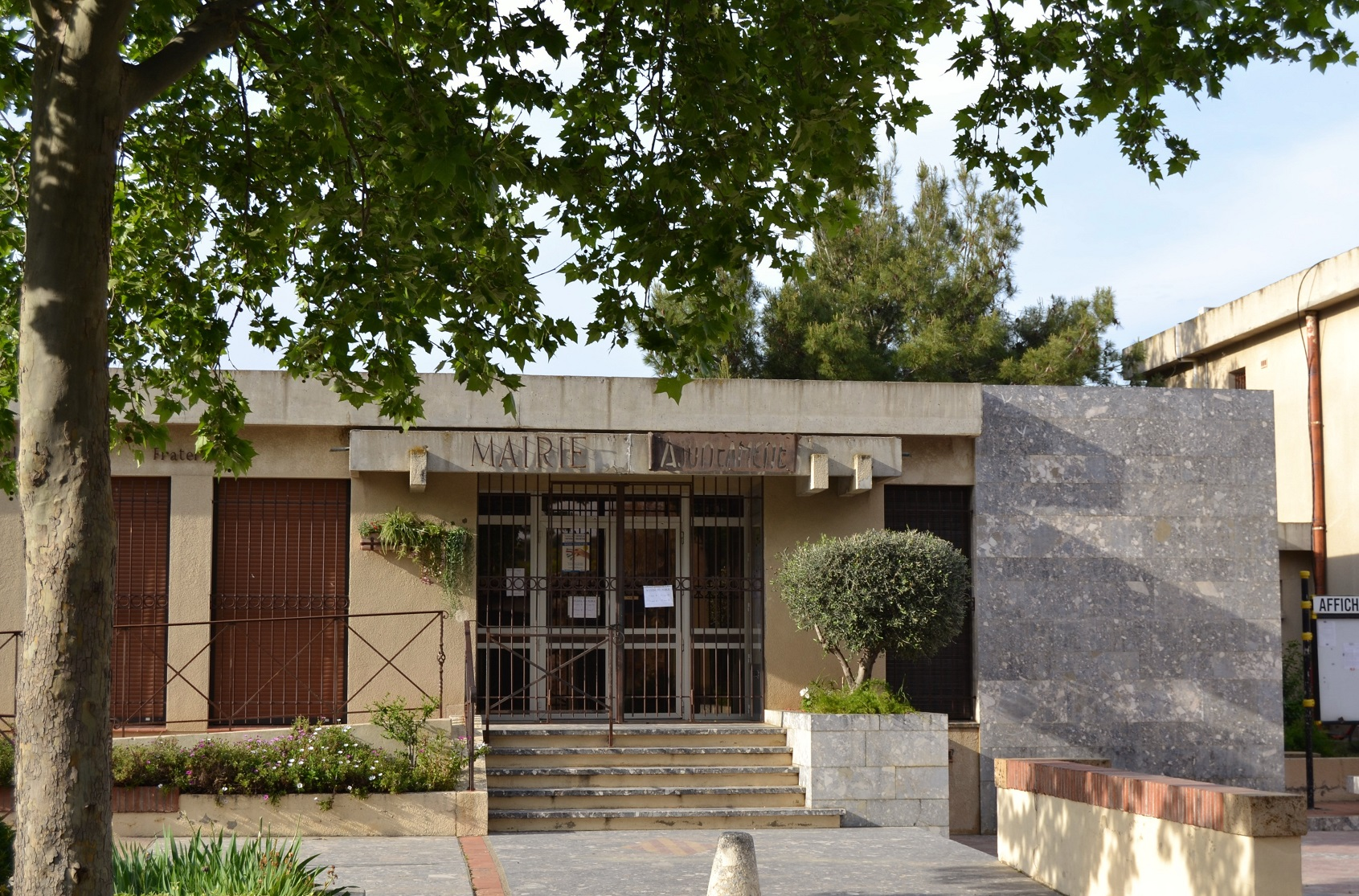
- The town hall in Peyrestortes

- Coat of arms
- Location of Peyrestortes
- Location within France Location within Occitanie
- Coordinates: 42°45′18″N 2°51′09″E
- Country: France
- Region: Occitania
- Department: Pyrénées-Orientales
- Arrondissement: Perpignan
- Canton: Le Ribéral
- Intercommunality: Perpignan Méditerranée Métropole

Government
  - Mayor (2020–2026): Alain Dario
- Area^{1}: 7.96 km^{2} (3.07 sq mi)
- Elevation: 35 m (115 ft)
- Highest elevation: 97 m (318 ft)
- Lowest elevation: 35 m (115 ft)
- Population (2023): 1,927
  - Density: 242/km^{2} (627/sq mi)
- Time zone: UTC+01:00 (CET)
  - Summer (DST): UTC+02:00 (CEST)
- INSEE/Postal code: 66138 /66600
- ^{1} French Land Register data, which excludes lakes, ponds, glaciers > 1 km^{2} (0.386 sq mi or 247 acres) and river estuaries.

Peyrestortes (French pronunciation: [peʁɛstɔʁt]; Catalan: Paretstortes) is a commune in the Pyrénées-Orientales department in southern France.

== Geography ==
Peyrestortes is located in the canton of Le Ribéral and in the arrondissement of Perpignan.

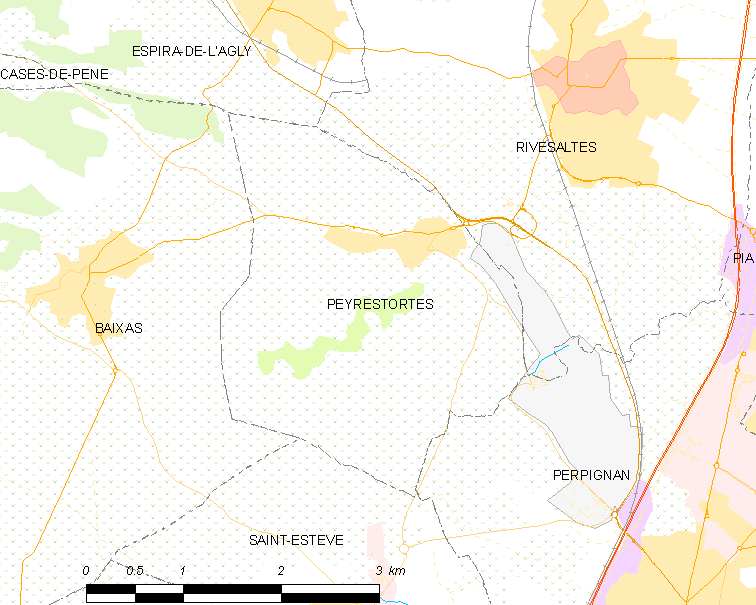
Map of Peyrestortes and its surrounding communes

== History ==
=== Battle ===
On 17 September 1793, French forces of the Army of the Eastern Pyrenees defeated two divisions of the Spanish Army of Catalonia at the Battle of Peyrestortes. General of Division Eustache Charles d'Aoust led his division to attack Lieutenant General (LG) Juan de Courten's Spanish troops at Le Vernet north of Perpignan. At the same time General of Brigade Antoine Goguet's French division assaulted the camp of LG Jerónimo Girón-Moctezuma, Marquis de las Amarilas on the hill south of Peyrestortes. The beaten Spanish troops, which were under the overall command of Captain General Antonio Ricardos withdrew south to Trouillas. A monument about one km southeast of the village and adjacent to the Perpignan-Rivesaltes International Airport commemorates the victory.

A la mémoire de l'armée des Pyrénées-Orientales qui combattirent à Peyrestortes sous la conduite des conventionnels Cassanyes, Fabre, des généraux Daoust et Goguet.

An English translation is as follows.

To the memory of the Army of the Eastern Pyrenees who fought at Peyrestortes under the command of deputies Cassanyes, Fabre, of generals Daoust and Goguet.

== Population ==
Historical population
Year	Pop.	±% p.a.
1968	632	—
1975	692	+1.30%
1982	865	+3.24%
1990	1,286	+5.08%
1999	1,430	+1.19%
2007	1,364	−0.59%
2012	1,365	+0.01%
2017	1,427	+0.89%
2023	1,927	+5.13%
Source: INSEE

== See also ==
- Communes of the Pyrénées-Orientales department
