= Canton of Perpignan-2 =

Coordinates: 42.70°N 2.92°E

The Canton of Perpignan-2 is a French canton of Pyrénées-Orientales department, in Occitanie.

== Composition ==
At the French canton reorganisation which came into effect in March 2015, the canton was expanded from 1 to 4 communes:

- Bompas
- Perpignan (eastern part)
- Sainte-Marie-la-Mer
- Villelongue-de-la-Salanque

Before 2015, the Perpignan 2nd Canton included only the following neighbourhoods of Perpignan:

- East downtown
- Saint-Jacques
- Saint-Jean
- La Bassa
- Les Remparts
