= Pézilla-la-Rivière =

Pézilla-la-Rivière Pesillà de la Ribera
- Commune
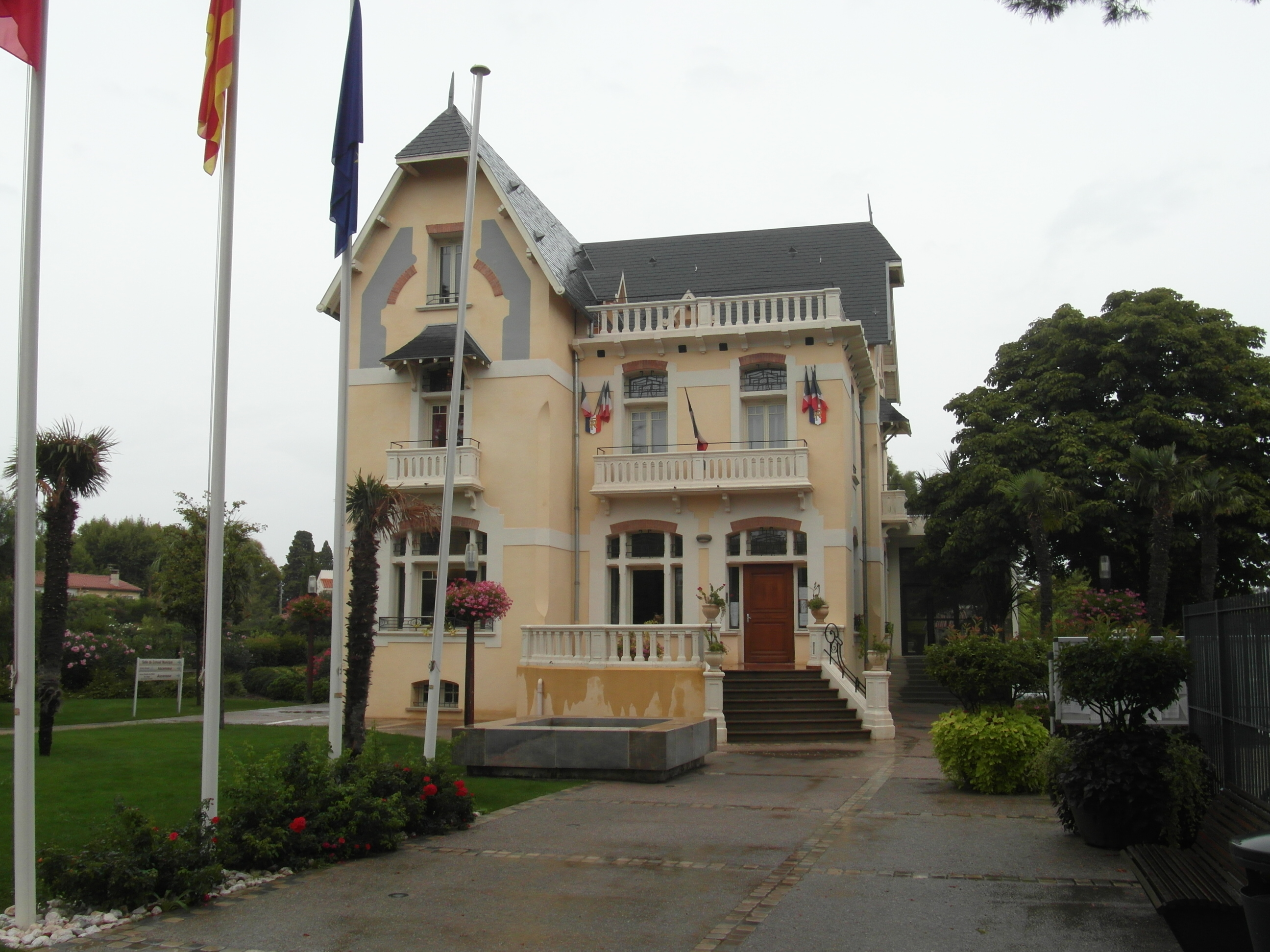
- The town hall in Pézilla-la-Rivière

- Coat of arms
- Location of Pézilla-la-Rivière
- Location within France Location within Occitanie
- Coordinates: 42°41′46″N 2°46′17″E
- Country: France
- Region: Occitania
- Department: Pyrénées-Orientales
- Arrondissement: Perpignan
- Canton: Le Ribéral
- Intercommunality: Perpignan Méditerranée Métropole

Government
  - Mayor (2020–2026): Jean-Paul Billés
- Area^{1}: 15.62 km^{2} (6.03 sq mi)
- Elevation: 62 m (203 ft)
- Highest elevation: 243 m (797 ft)
- Lowest elevation: 40 m (130 ft)
- Population (2023): 4,129
  - Density: 264.3/km^{2} (684.6/sq mi)
- Time zone: UTC+01:00 (CET)
  - Summer (DST): UTC+02:00 (CEST)
- INSEE/Postal code: 66140 /66370
- ^{1} French Land Register data, which excludes lakes, ponds, glaciers > 1 km^{2} (0.386 sq mi or 247 acres) and river estuaries.

Pézilla-la-Rivière (French pronunciation: [pezija la ʁivjɛʁ]; Catalan: Pesillà de la Ribera) is a commune in the Pyrénées-Orientales department in southern France.

== Geography ==
Pézilla-la-Rivière is located in the canton of Le Ribéral and in the arrondissement of Perpignan.

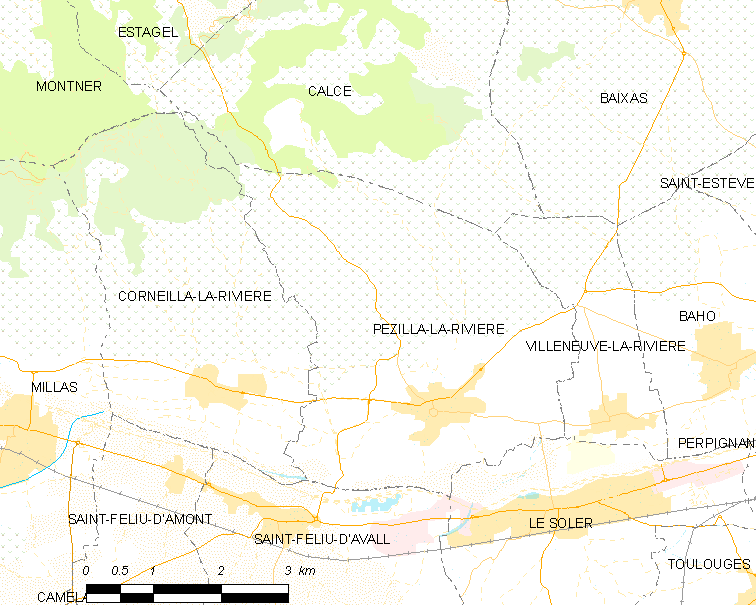
Map of Pézilla-la-Rivière and its surrounding communes

== Population ==
Historical population
Year	Pop.	±% p.a.
1968	2,159	—
1975	2,058	−0.68%
1982	2,200	+0.96%
1990	2,349	+0.82%
1999	2,754	+1.78%
2007	3,083	+1.42%
2012	3,330	+1.55%
2017	3,662	+1.92%
2023	4,129	+2.02%
Source: INSEE

== See also ==
- Communes of the Pyrénées-Orientales department
