= Saint-Estève =

Saint-Estève Sant Esteve del Monestir (Catalan)
- Commune
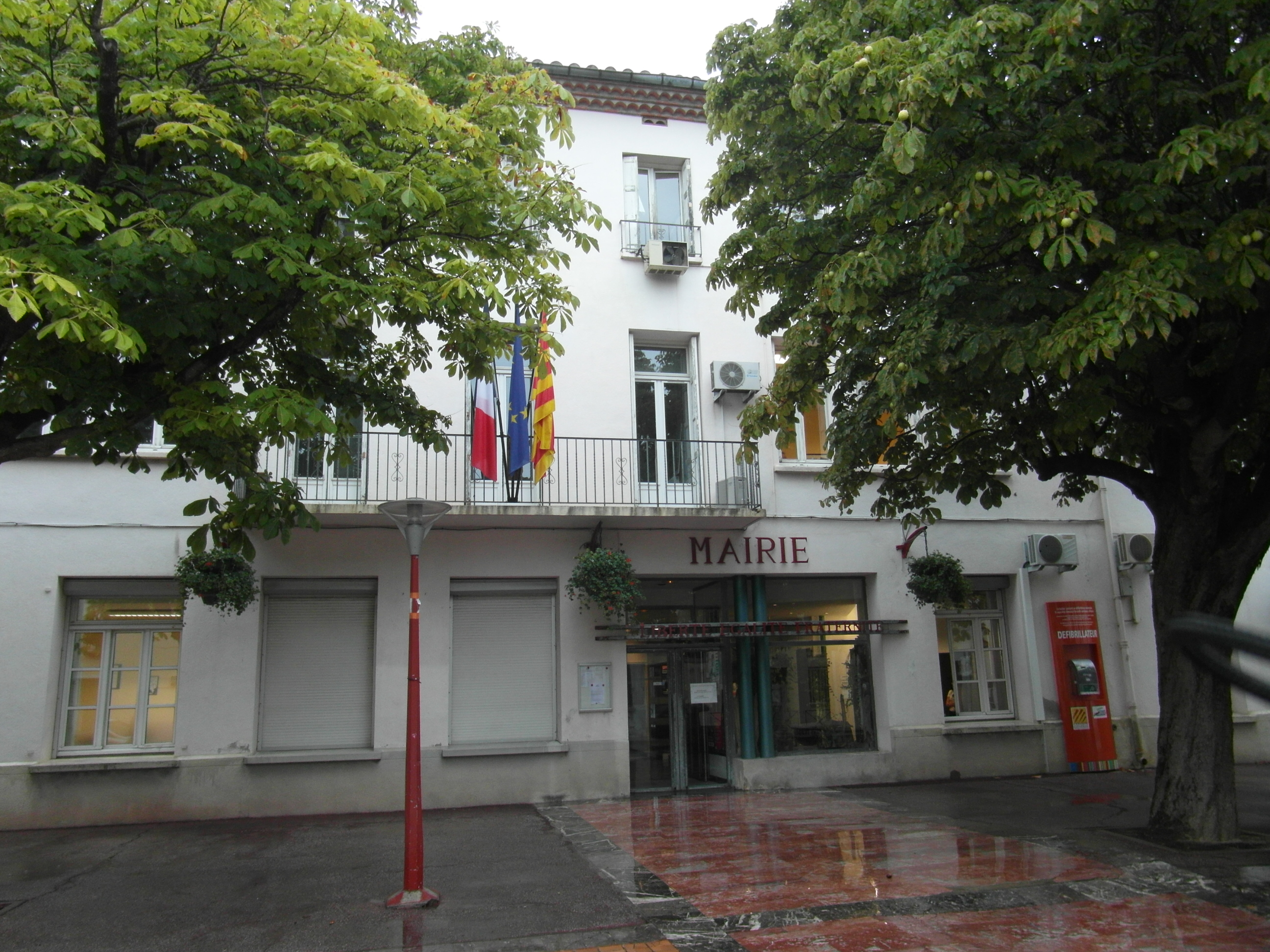
- The town hall in Saint-Estève
- Location of Saint-Estève
- Location within France Location within Occitanie
- Coordinates: 42°42′51″N 2°50′34″E
- Country: France
- Region: Occitania
- Department: Pyrénées-Orientales
- Arrondissement: Perpignan
- Canton: Le Ribéral
- Intercommunality: Perpignan Méditerranée Métropole

Government
  - Mayor (2020–2026): Robert Vila (LR)
- Area^{1}: 11.67 km^{2} (4.51 sq mi)
- Elevation: 33 m (108 ft)
- Highest elevation: 91 m (299 ft)
- Lowest elevation: 30 m (98 ft)
- Population (2023): 11,630
  - Density: 996.6/km^{2} (2,581/sq mi)
- Time zone: UTC+01:00 (CET)
  - Summer (DST): UTC+02:00 (CEST)
- INSEE/Postal code: 66172 /66240
- ^{1} French Land Register data, which excludes lakes, ponds, glaciers > 1 km^{2} (0.386 sq mi or 247 acres) and river estuaries.

Saint-Estève (French pronunciation: [sɛ̃.t‿ɛstɛv]; Catalan: Sant Esteve del Monestir) is a commune in the Pyrénées-Orientales department in southern France.

== Geography ==
Saint-Estève is in the canton of Le Ribéral and in the arrondissement of Perpignan.

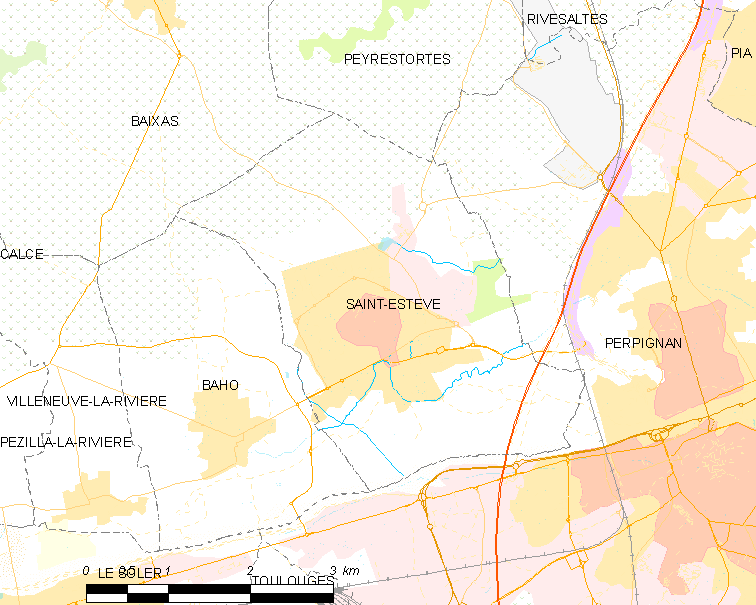
Map of Saint-Estève and its surrounding communes

== Population ==
Historical population
Year	Pop.	±% p.a.
1968	2,589	—
1975	5,370	+10.98%
1982	8,492	+6.77%
1990	9,856	+1.88%
1999	9,810	−0.05%
2007	11,120	+1.58%
2012	11,362	+0.43%
2017	11,658	+0.52%
2023	11,630	−0.04%
Source: INSEE

== See also ==
- Communes of the Pyrénées-Orientales department
