= Baixas =

Baixas Baixàs (Catalan)
- Commune
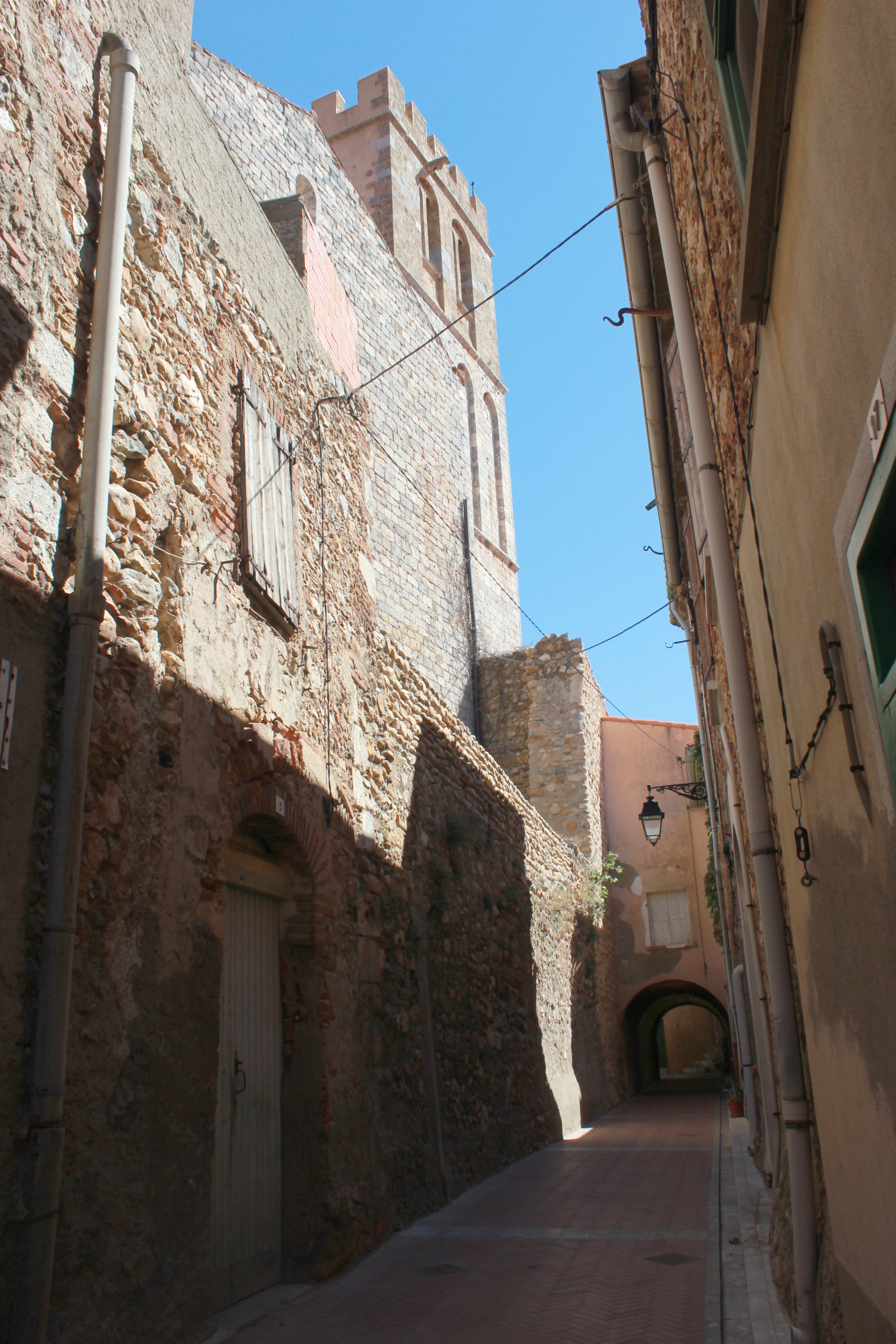
- An alley in Baixas

- Coat of arms
- Location of Baixas
- Location within France Location within Occitanie
- Coordinates: 42°45′03″N 2°48′36″E
- Country: France
- Region: Occitania
- Department: Pyrénées-Orientales
- Arrondissement: Perpignan
- Canton: Le Ribéral
- Intercommunality: Perpignan Méditerranée Métropole

Government
  - Mayor (2020–2026): Gilles Foxonet
- Area^{1}: 18.91 km^{2} (7.30 sq mi)
- Highest elevation: 312 m (1,024 ft)
- Lowest elevation: 51 m (167 ft)
- Population (2023): 2,777
  - Density: 146.9/km^{2} (380.3/sq mi)
- Demonym: baixanenc (ca)
- Time zone: UTC+01:00 (CET)
  - Summer (DST): UTC+02:00 (CEST)
- INSEE/Postal code: 66014 /66390
- ^{1} French Land Register data, which excludes lakes, ponds, glaciers > 1 km^{2} (0.386 sq mi or 247 acres) and river estuaries.

Baixas (French pronunciation: [baʃas]; Catalan: Baixàs [bəˈʃas]) is a commune in the Pyrénées-Orientales department in southern France.

== Geography ==
=== Localisation ===
Baixas is located in the canton of Le Ribéral and in the arrondissement of Perpignan.

It is part of the Northern Catalan comarca of Rosselló.

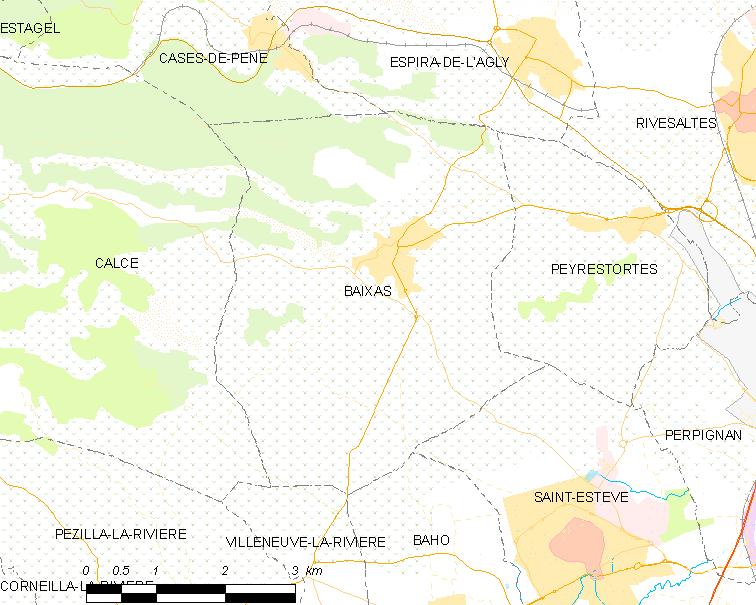
Map of Baixas and its surrounding communes

== Government and politics ==
=== Mayors ===
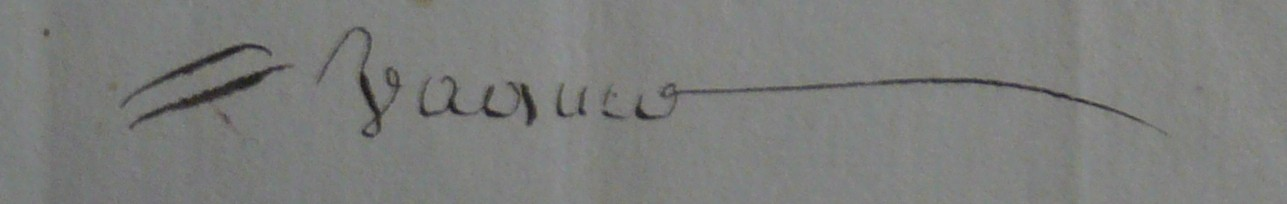
Signature of mayor Vaquer in 1815

| Mayor | Term start | Term end |
|---|---|---|
| Vaquer | ? | June 1815 |
| Honoré Tarrieux | June 1815 | ? |
| Désiré Bobo | 1896 | 1904 |
| Henri Thomas | 1904 | 1919 |
| Jules Bonzoms | 1919 | 1925 |
| Jacques Frigola | 1925 | 1944 |
| Robert Cantier | 1944 | 1947 |
| Georges Bobo | 1947 | 1959 |
| Servais Bobo | 1959 | 1971 |
| Robert Frigola | 1971 | 1995 |
| Roger Torreilles | 1995 | 2001 |
| Gilles Foxonet | 2001 | |

== Population ==
Historical population
| Year | Pop. | ±% p.a. |
|---|---|---|
| 1968 | 2,057 | — |
| 1975 | 1,969 | −0.62% |
| 1982 | 2,104 | +0.95% |
| 1990 | 2,027 | −0.46% |
| 1999 | 2,217 | +1.00% |
| 2007 | 2,433 | +1.17% |
| 2012 | 2,587 | +1.24% |
| 2017 | 2,573 | −0.11% |
| 2023 | 2,777 | +1.28% |
Source: INSEE

== Notable people ==
- Andrzej Szpilman (1956-), Polish composer living partly in Baixas.

== See also ==
- Communes of the Pyrénées-Orientales department
