= Villelongue-de-la-Salanque =

- Commune
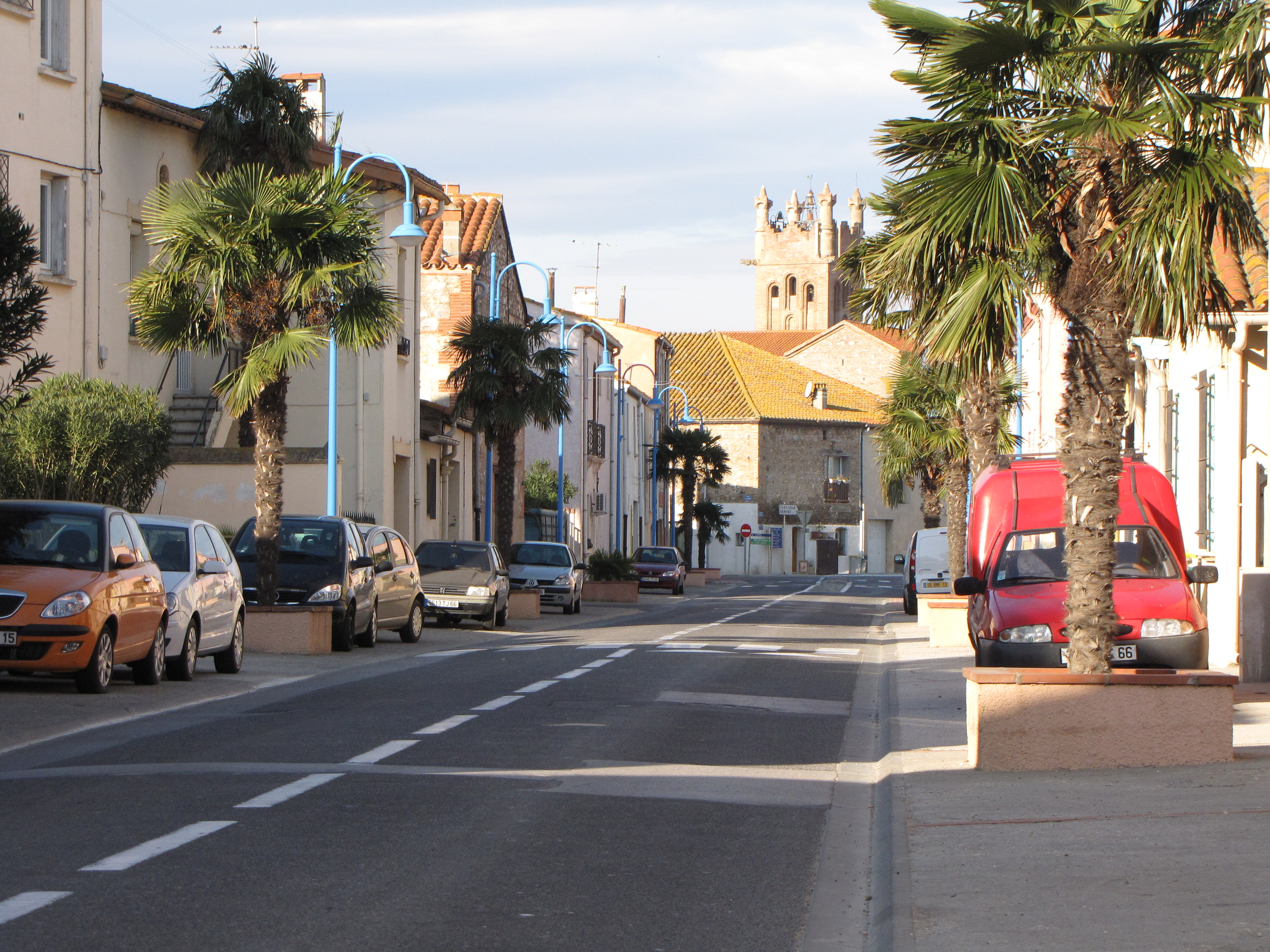
- A view within Villelongue-de-la-Salanque

- Coat of arms
- Location of Villelongue-de-la-Salanque
- Location within France Location within Occitanie
- Coordinates: 42°43′43″N 2°59′05″E
- Country: France
- Region: Occitania
- Department: Pyrénées-Orientales
- Arrondissement: Perpignan
- Canton: Perpignan-2
- Intercommunality: Perpignan Méditerranée Métropole

Government
  - Mayor (2020–2026): Whueymar Deffradas
- Area^{1}: 7.21 km^{2} (2.78 sq mi)
- Elevation: 10 m (33 ft)
- Highest elevation: 15 m (49 ft)
- Lowest elevation: 5 m (16 ft)
- Population (2023): 3,335
  - Density: 463/km^{2} (1,200/sq mi)
- Time zone: UTC+01:00 (CET)
  - Summer (DST): UTC+02:00 (CEST)
- INSEE/Postal code: 66224 /66410
- ^{1} French Land Register data, which excludes lakes, ponds, glaciers > 1 km^{2} (0.386 sq mi or 247 acres) and river estuaries.

Villelongue-de-la-Salanque (French pronunciation: [vil.lɔ̃ɡ də la salɑ̃k]; Catalan: Vilallonga de la Salanca) is a commune in the Pyrénées-Orientales department in southern France.

== Geography ==
Villelongue-de-la-Salanque is located in the canton of Perpignan-2 and in the arrondissement of Perpignan.

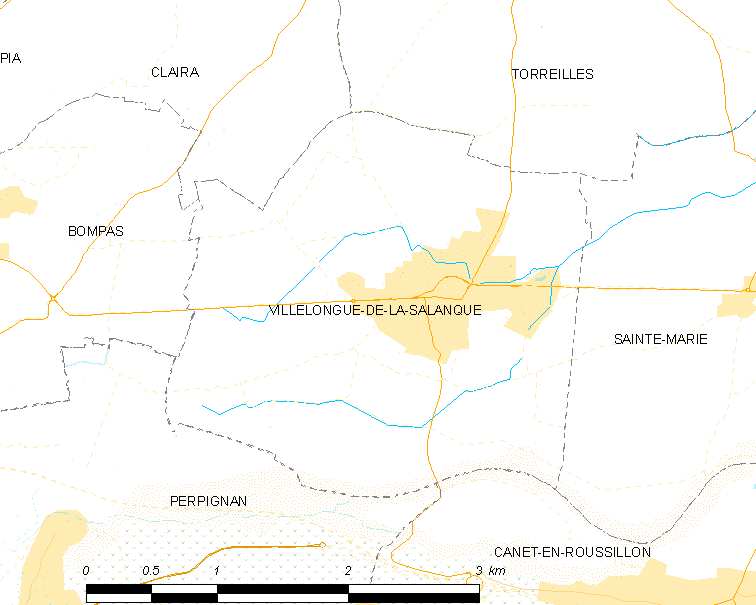
Map of Villelongue-de-la-Salanque and its surrounding communes

== Population ==
Historical population
Year	Pop.	±% p.a.
1968	1,642	—
1975	1,548	−0.84%
1982	2,027	+3.93%
1990	2,139	+0.67%
1999	2,461	+1.57%
2007	2,912	+2.13%
2012	3,229	+2.09%
2017	3,254	+0.15%
2023	3,335	+0.41%
Source: INSEE

== See also ==
- Communes of the Pyrénées-Orientales department
