= Villeneuve-la-Rivière =

Villeneuve-la-Rivière Vilanova de la Ribera
- Commune
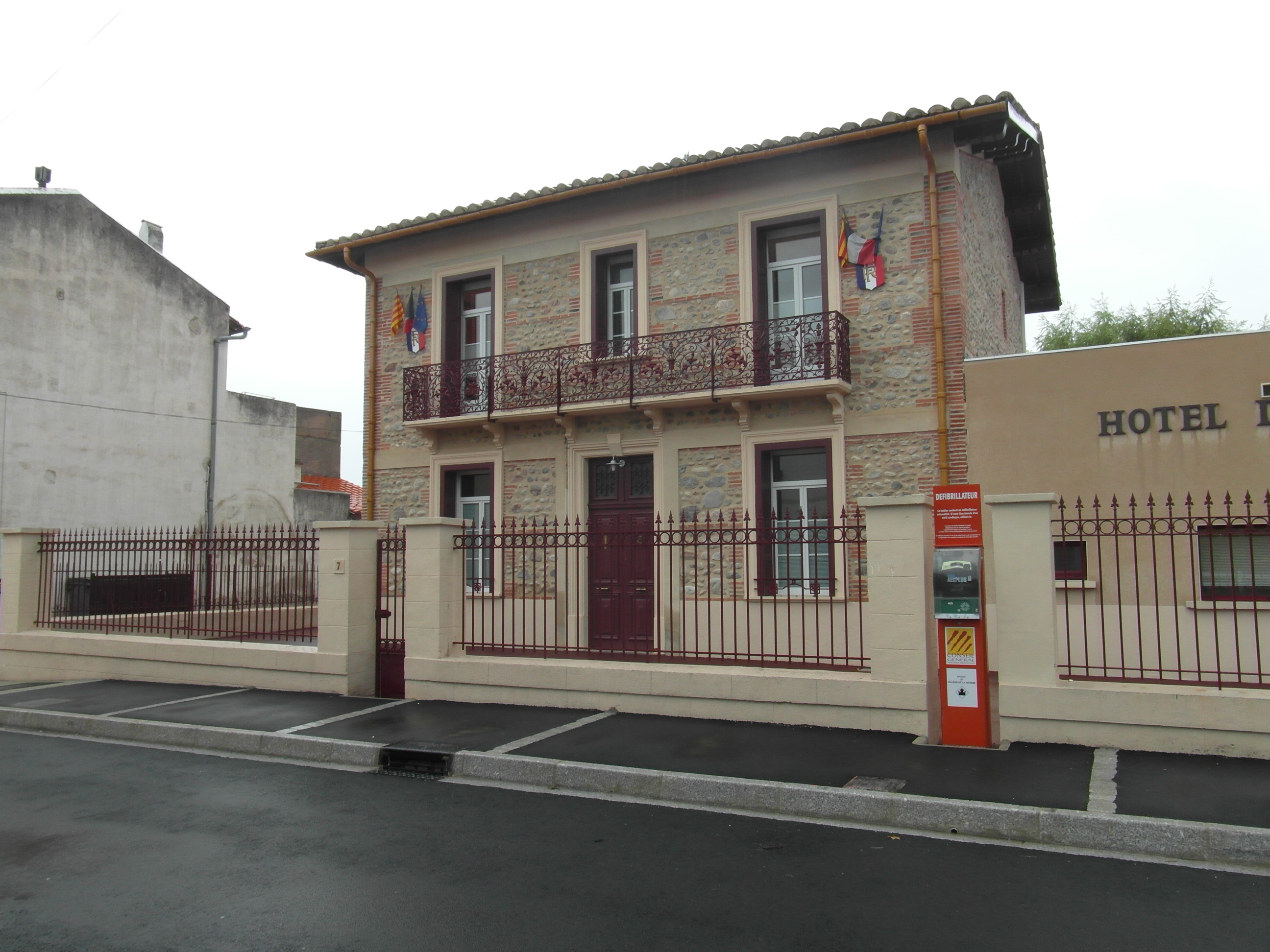
- The town hall in Villeneuve-la-Rivière

- Coat of arms
- Location of Villeneuve-la-Rivière
- Location within France Location within Occitanie
- Coordinates: 42°41′40″N 2°48′15″E
- Country: France
- Region: Occitania
- Department: Pyrénées-Orientales
- Arrondissement: Perpignan
- Canton: Le Ribéral
- Intercommunality: Perpignan Méditerranée Métropole

Government
  - Mayor (2020–2026): Patrick Pascal
- Area^{1}: 4.38 km^{2} (1.69 sq mi)
- Elevation: 20 m (66 ft)
- Highest elevation: 115 m (377 ft)
- Lowest elevation: 48 m (157 ft)
- Population (2023): 1,360
  - Density: 311/km^{2} (804/sq mi)
- Time zone: UTC+01:00 (CET)
  - Summer (DST): UTC+02:00 (CEST)
- INSEE/Postal code: 66228 /66610
- ^{1} French Land Register data, which excludes lakes, ponds, glaciers > 1 km^{2} (0.386 sq mi or 247 acres) and river estuaries.

Villeneuve-la-Rivière (French pronunciation: [vilnœv la ʁivjɛʁ]; Catalan: Vilanova de la Ribera) is a commune in the Pyrénées-Orientales department in southern France.

== Geography ==
Villeneuve-la-Rivière is located in the canton of Le Ribéral and in the arrondissement of Perpignan.

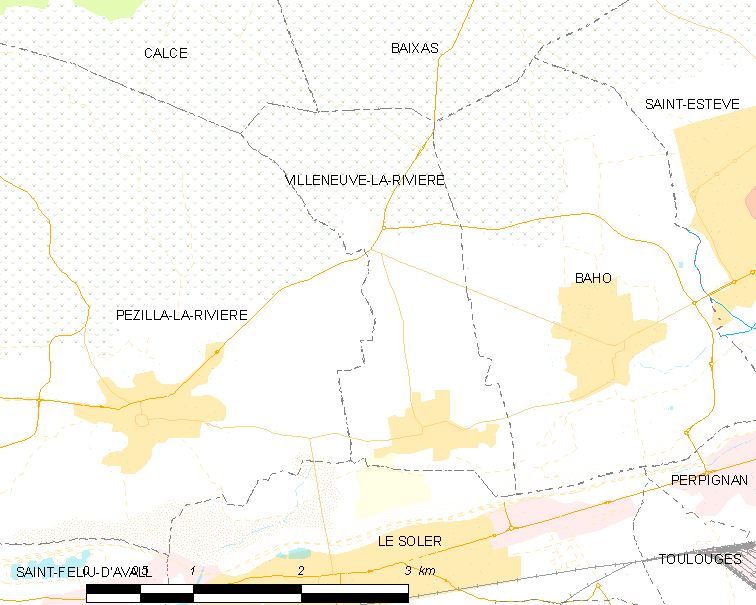
Map of Villeneuve-la-Rivière and its surrounding communes

== Population ==
Historical population
Year	Pop.	±% p.a.
1968	632	—
1975	569	−1.49%
1982	910	+6.94%
1990	901	−0.12%
1999	1,052	+1.74%
2007	1,309	+2.77%
2012	1,290	−0.29%
2017	1,316	+0.40%
2023	1,360	+0.55%
Source: INSEE

== See also ==
- Communes of the Pyrénées-Orientales department
