= Sainte-Marie-la-Mer =

Sainte-Marie-la-Mer Santa Maria la Mar
- Commune
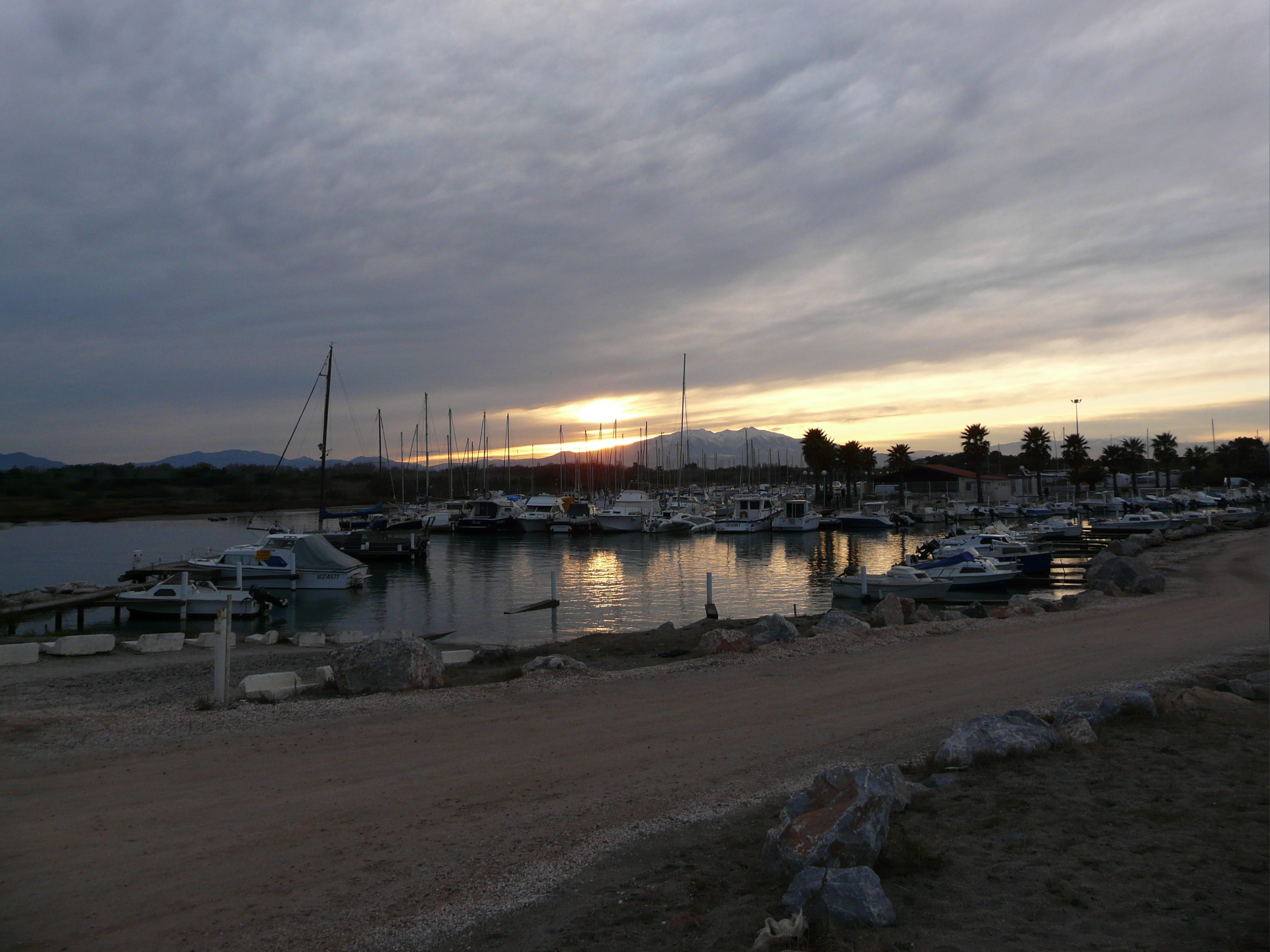
- The harbour of Sainte-Marie
- Location of Sainte-Marie-la-Mer
- Location within France Location within Occitanie
- Coordinates: 42°43′41″N 3°01′04″E
- Country: France
- Region: Occitania
- Department: Pyrénées-Orientales
- Arrondissement: Perpignan
- Canton: Perpignan-2
- Intercommunality: Perpignan Méditerranée Métropole

Government
  - Mayor (2020–2026): Edmond Jorda
- Area^{1}: 10.29 km^{2} (3.97 sq mi)
- Elevation: 8 m (26 ft)
- Highest elevation: 10 m (33 ft)
- Lowest elevation: 0 m (0 ft)
- Population (2023): 4,952
  - Density: 481.2/km^{2} (1,246/sq mi)
- Time zone: UTC+01:00 (CET)
  - Summer (DST): UTC+02:00 (CEST)
- INSEE/Postal code: 66182 /66470
- ^{1} French Land Register data, which excludes lakes, ponds, glaciers > 1 km^{2} (0.386 sq mi or 247 acres) and river estuaries.

Sainte-Marie-la-Mer (French pronunciation: [sɛ̃t maʁi la mɛʁ]; before 2017: Sainte-Marie, Catalan: Santa Maria la Mar) is a commune in the Pyrénées-Orientales department in southern France.

== Geography ==
Sainte-Marie-la-Mer is located east of Perpignan, in the canton of Perpignan-2 and in the arrondissement of Perpignan.

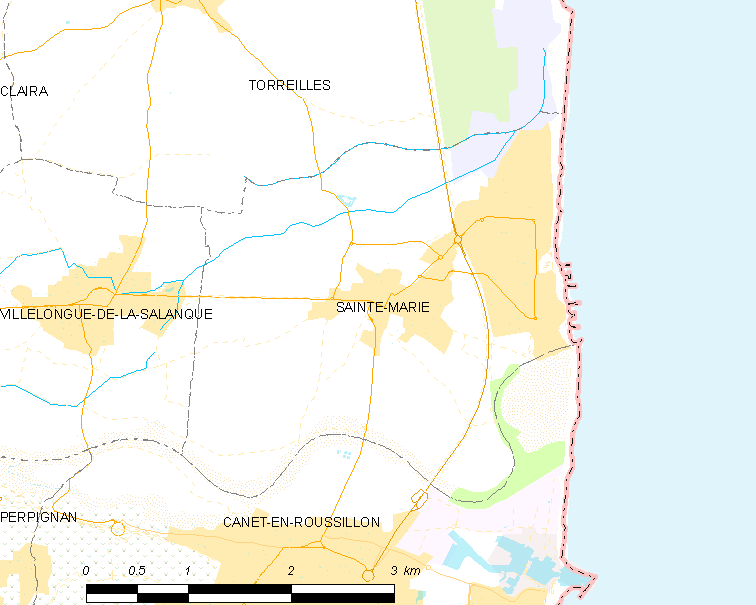
Map of Sainte-Marie and its surrounding communes

== Administration ==
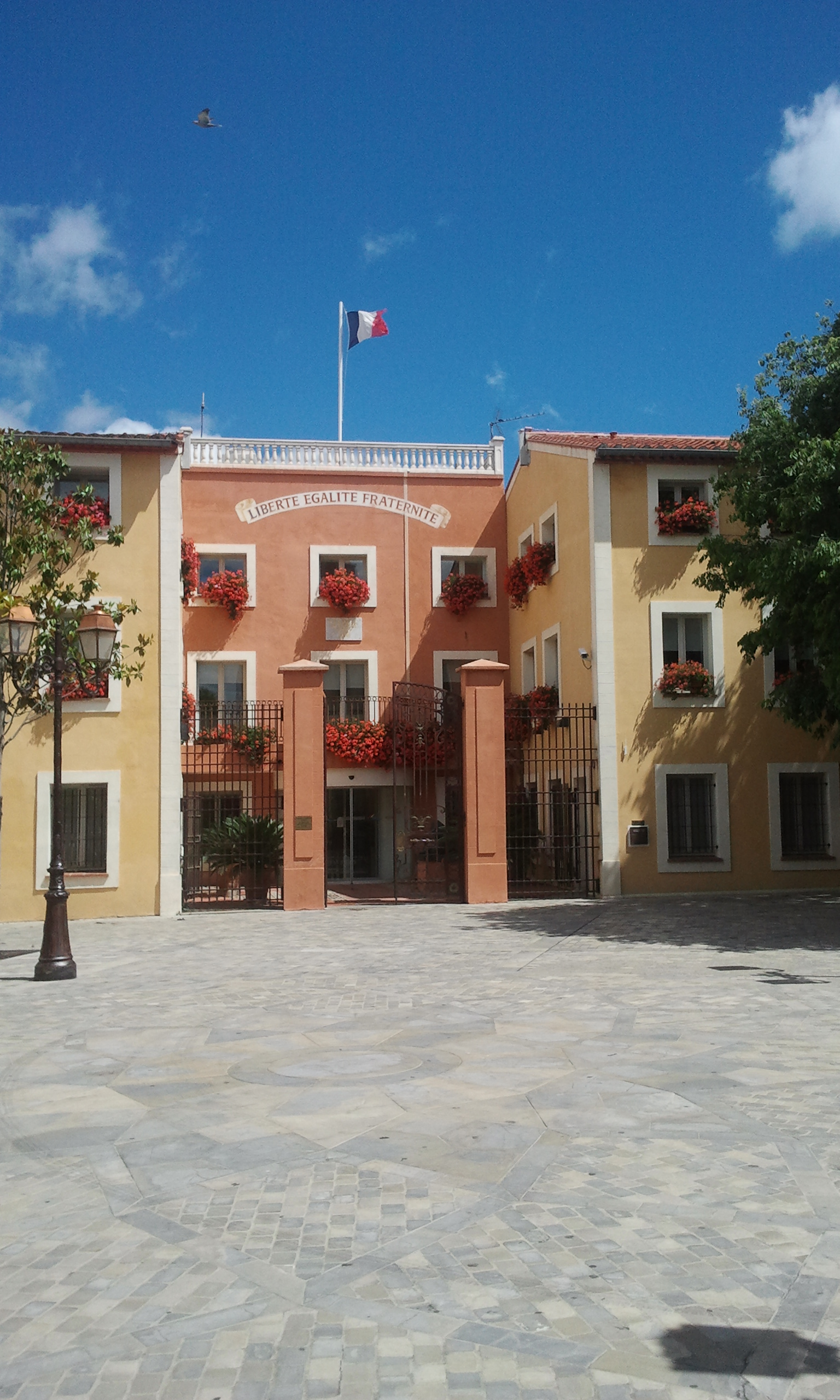
The Town Hall

=== List of mayors ===
- Pierre Roig (UMP): since 2001, elected again in 2008.
- Edmond Jorda, elected in 2020

== Population ==
Historical population
Year	Pop.	±% p.a.
1968	975	—
1975	931	−0.66%
1982	1,285	+4.71%
1990	2,171	+6.78%
1999	3,452	+5.29%
2007	4,105	+2.19%
2012	4,687	+2.69%
2017	4,773	+0.36%
2023	4,952	+0.62%
Source: INSEE

== See also ==
- Communes of the Pyrénées-Orientales department
