= Saint-Nazaire, Pyrénées-Orientales =

Saint-Nazaire Sant Nazari (Catalan)
- Commune
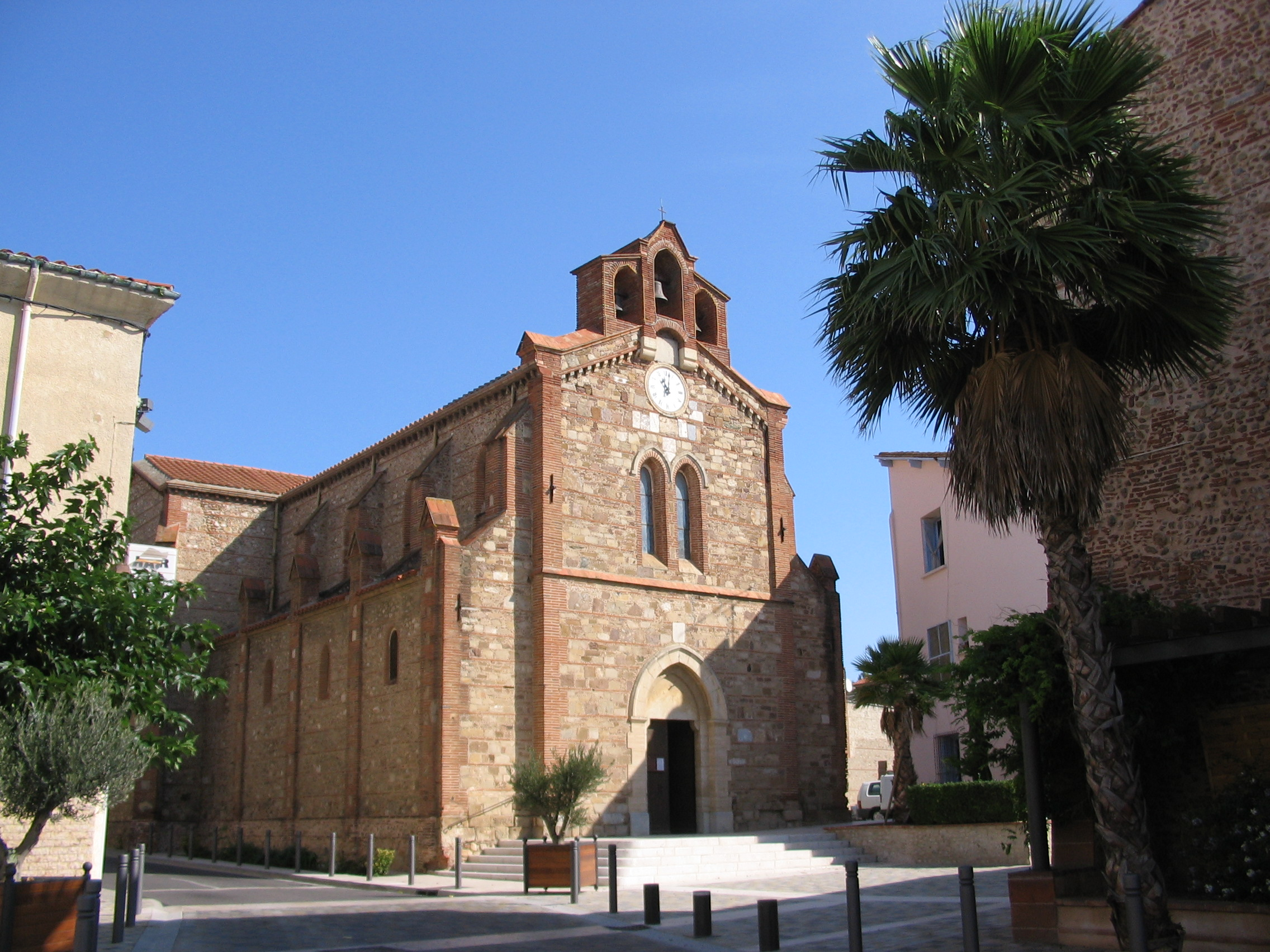
- The chapel of Notre-Dame de l'Arca, in Saint-Nazaire

- Coat of arms
- Location of Saint-Nazaire
- Location within France Location within Occitanie
- Coordinates: 42°40′07″N 2°59′33″E
- Country: France
- Region: Occitania
- Department: Pyrénées-Orientales
- Arrondissement: Perpignan
- Canton: La Côte Sableuse
- Intercommunality: Perpignan Méditerranée Métropole

Government
  - Mayor (2020–2026): Jean-Claude Torrens (LR)
- Area^{1}: 10.33 km^{2} (3.99 sq mi)
- Elevation: 6 m (20 ft)
- Highest elevation: 18 m (59 ft)
- Lowest elevation: 0 m (0 ft)
- Population (2023): 2,779
  - Density: 269.0/km^{2} (696.8/sq mi)
- Time zone: UTC+01:00 (CET)
  - Summer (DST): UTC+02:00 (CEST)
- INSEE/Postal code: 66186 /66570
- ^{1} French Land Register data, which excludes lakes, ponds, glaciers > 1 km^{2} (0.386 sq mi or 247 acres) and river estuaries.

Saint-Nazaire (French: [sɛ̃ nazɛːʁ]; Catalan: Sant Nazari de Rosselló) is a commune in the Pyrénées-Orientales department in southern France.

== Geography ==
Saint-Nazaire is located in the canton of La Côte Sableuse and in the arrondissement of Perpignan.

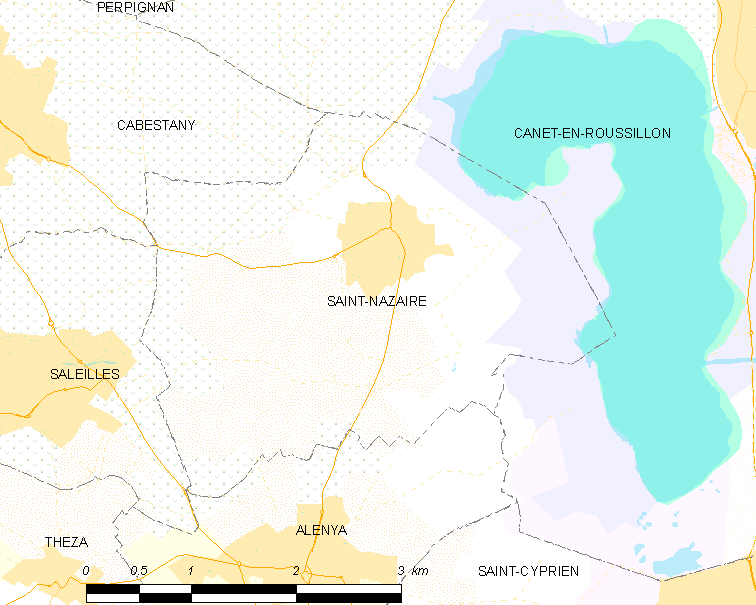
Map of Saint-Nazaire and its surrounding communes

== Population ==
Historical population
Year	Pop.	±% p.a.
1968	706	—
1975	771	+1.27%
1982	1,189	+6.38%
1990	2,048	+7.03%
1999	2,380	+1.68%
2007	2,337	−0.23%
2012	2,543	+1.70%
2017	2,688	+1.12%
2023	2,779	+0.56%
Source: INSEE

== See also ==
- Communes of the Pyrénées-Orientales department
