= Calce, Pyrénées-Orientales =

Calce
- Commune
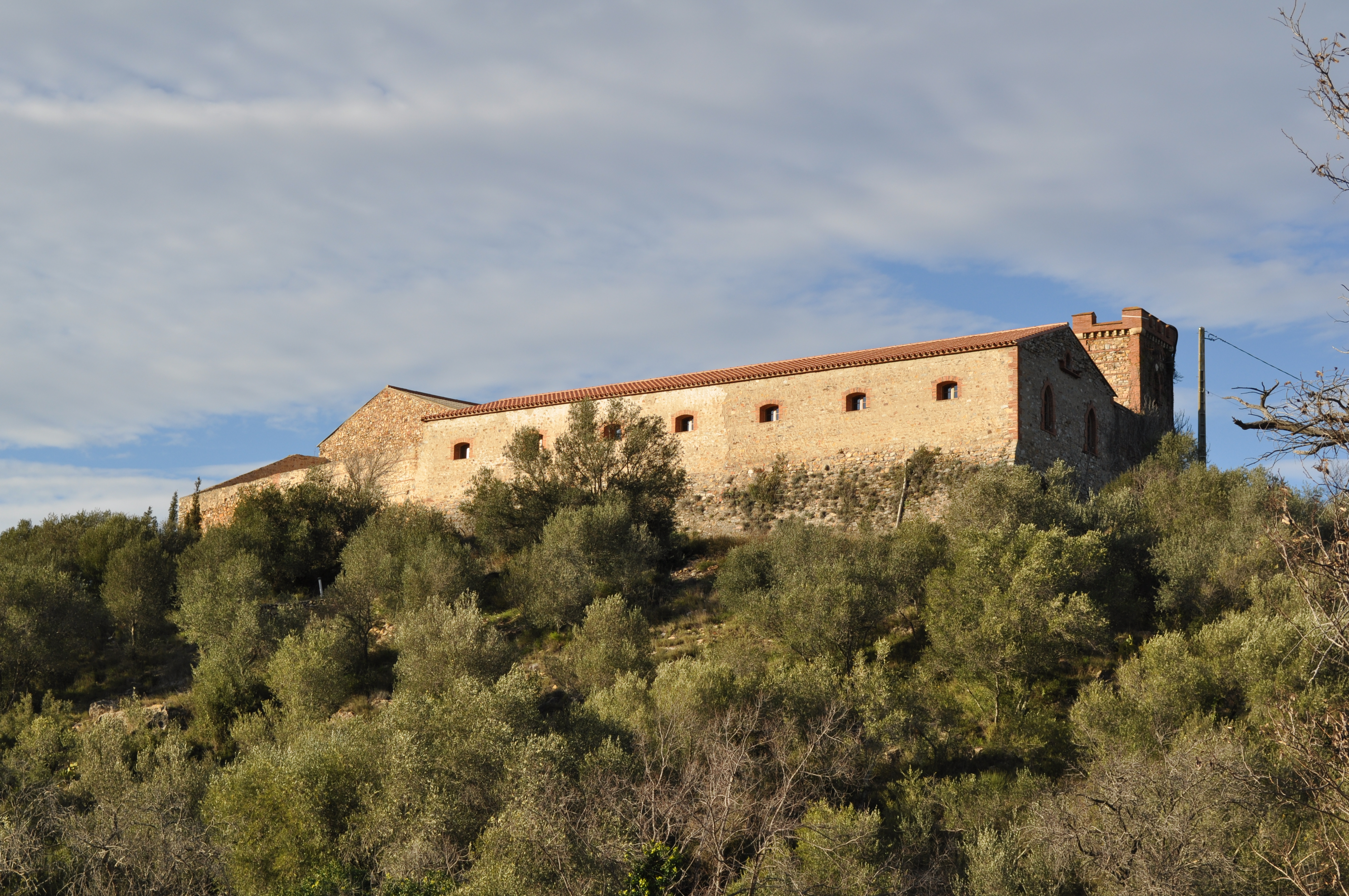
- The château of Mas de Las Fons

- Coat of arms
- Location of Calce
- Location within France Location within Occitanie
- Coordinates: 42°45′35″N 2°45′16″E
- Country: France
- Region: Occitania
- Department: Pyrénées-Orientales
- Arrondissement: Perpignan
- Canton: Le Ribéral
- Intercommunality: Perpignan Méditerranée Métropole

Government
  - Mayor (2020–2026): Bruno Valiente
- Area^{1}: 23.77 km^{2} (9.18 sq mi)
- Elevation: 228 m (748 ft)
- Highest elevation: 330 m (1,080 ft)
- Lowest elevation: 54 m (177 ft)
- Population (2023): 226
  - Density: 9.51/km^{2} (24.6/sq mi)
- Time zone: UTC+01:00 (CET)
  - Summer (DST): UTC+02:00 (CEST)
- INSEE/Postal code: 66030 /66600
- ^{1} French Land Register data, which excludes lakes, ponds, glaciers > 1 km^{2} (0.386 sq mi or 247 acres) and river estuaries.

Calce (French pronunciation: [kals]; Catalan: Calce) is a commune in the Pyrénées-Orientales department in southern France.

== Geography ==
=== Localisation ===
Calce is located in the canton of Le Ribéral and in the arrondissement of Perpignan.

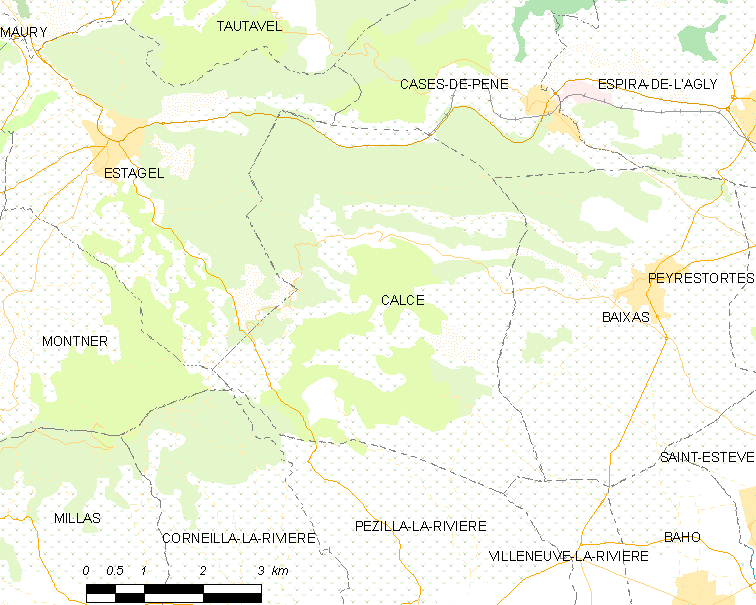
Map of Calce and its surrounding communes

== Government and politics ==
=== Mayors ===
| Mayor | Term start | Term end |
|---|---|---|
| Gil Deluncle | ? | 1815 |
| Pierre Deluncle Vidal | 1815 | ? |
| Paul Schramm | 2001 | 2014 |
| Bruno Valiente | 2014 | |

== Population ==
Historical population
| Year | Pop. | ±% p.a. |
|---|---|---|
| 1968 | 135 | — |
| 1975 | 116 | −2.14% |
| 1982 | 124 | +0.96% |
| 1990 | 161 | +3.32% |
| 1999 | 185 | +1.56% |
| 2007 | 225 | +2.48% |
| 2012 | 217 | −0.72% |
| 2017 | 210 | −0.65% |
| 2023 | 226 | +1.23% |
Source: INSEE

== See also ==
- Communes of the Pyrénées-Orientales department
- Center for Advanced Life Cycle Engineering
