= Baho =

Baho Bao (Catalan)
- Commune
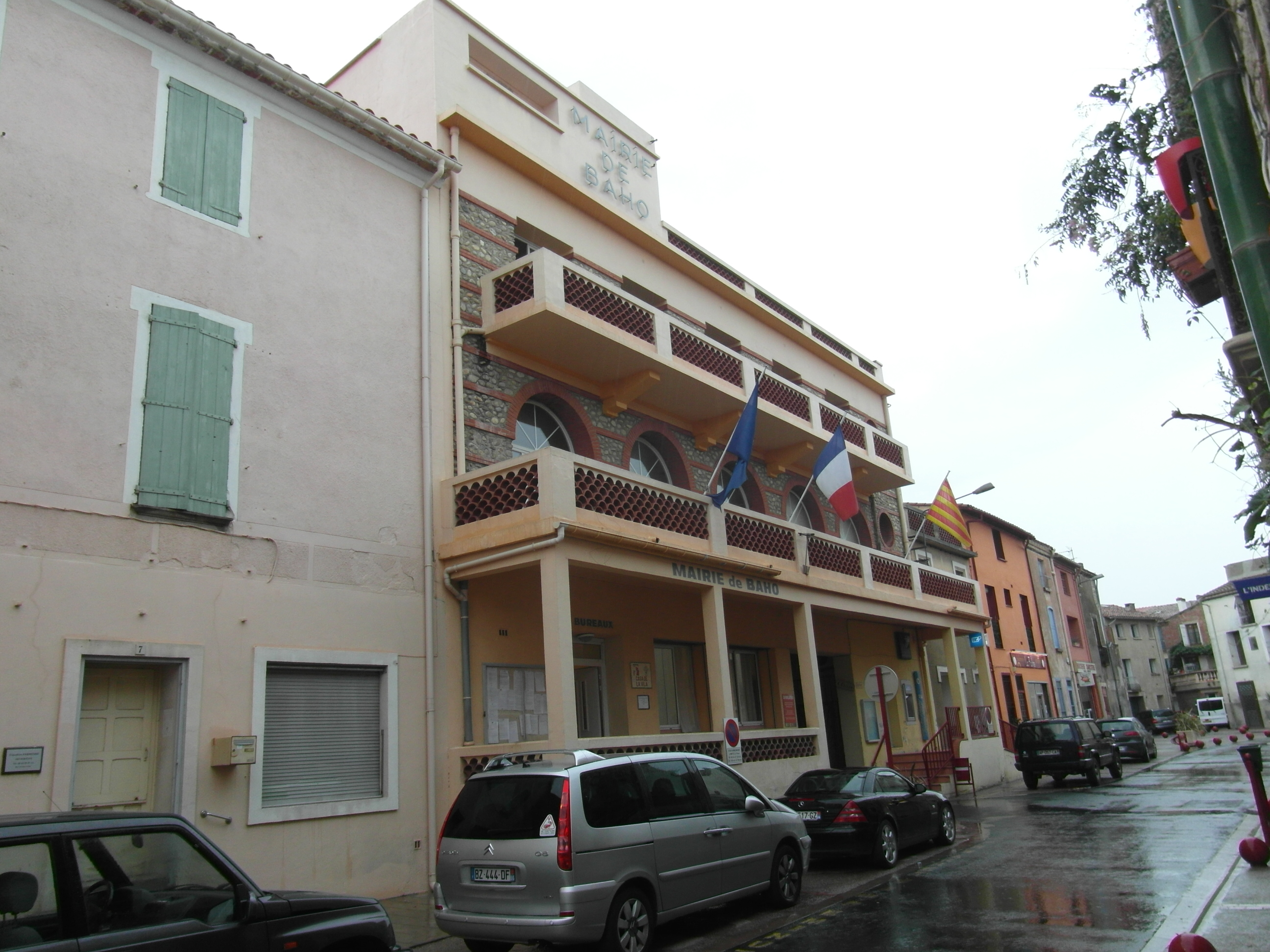
- The town hall in Baho

- Coat of arms
- Location of Baho
- Location within France Location within Occitanie
- Coordinates: 42°42′04″N 2°49′23″E
- Country: France
- Region: Occitania
- Department: Pyrénées-Orientales
- Arrondissement: Perpignan
- Canton: Le Ribéral
- Intercommunality: Perpignan Méditerranée Métropole

Government
  - Mayor (2026–32): Patrick Got
- Area^{1}: 7.90 km^{2} (3.05 sq mi)
- Elevation: 39 m (128 ft)
- Highest elevation: 90 m (300 ft)
- Lowest elevation: 34 m (112 ft)
- Population (2023): 3,231
  - Density: 409/km^{2} (1,060/sq mi)
- Demonym(s): bahotenc (fr) baotenc (ca)
- Time zone: UTC+01:00 (CET)
  - Summer (DST): UTC+02:00 (CEST)
- INSEE/Postal code: 66012 /66540
- ^{1} French Land Register data, which excludes lakes, ponds, glaciers > 1 km^{2} (0.386 sq mi or 247 acres) and river estuaries.

Baho (French pronunciation: [ba.o]; Catalan: Bao [ˈbau], locally [ˈbow]) is a commune in the Pyrénées-Orientales department in southern France.

== Geography ==
Baho is located in the canton of Le Ribéral and in the arrondissement of Perpignan.

It is part of the Northern Catalan comarca of Rosselló.

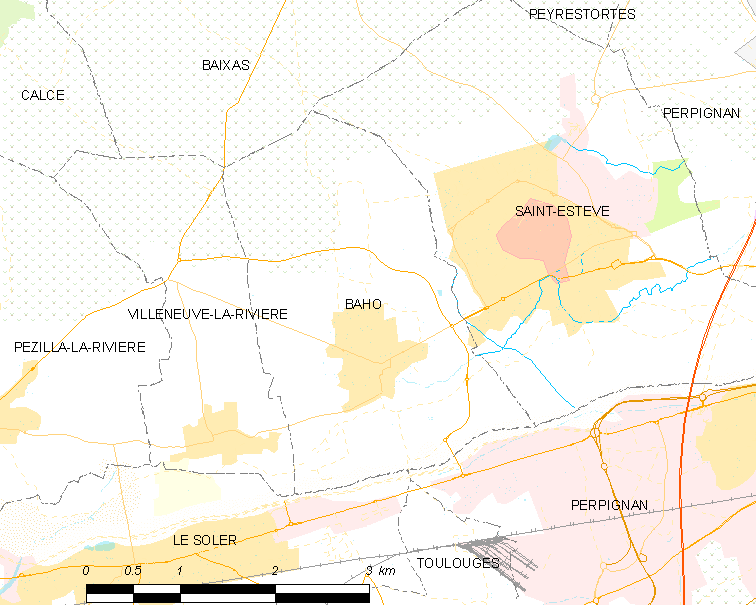
Map of Baho and its surrounding communes

== Government and politics ==
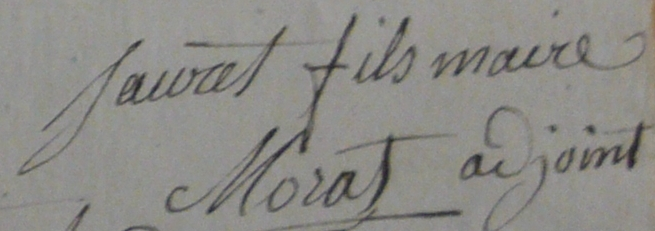
Signatures of the former and new mayors of Baho in 1815

=== Mayors ===
Mayor	Term start	Term end
Antoine Morat	?	June 1815
François Sauret Jr.	June 1815	?
Guy Casadevall	1983	2008
Patrick Got	2008	

== Population ==
The inhabitants are called Bahotencs in French.

Historical population
Year	Pop.	±% p.a.
1968	1,068	—
1975	1,449	+4.45%
1982	1,672	+2.07%
1990	2,027	+2.44%
1999	2,490	+2.31%
2007	2,928	+2.05%
2012	3,221	+1.93%
2017	3,217	−0.02%
2023	3,231	+0.07%
Source: INSEE

== Sites of interest ==
Baho is the site of an ancient fort. In the 10th century, Baho was a possession of the abbey of Saint-Michel-de-Cuxa (Pyrénées-Orientales)

== See also ==
- Communes of the Pyrénées-Orientales department
