= NRL Grand Final =

Rugby league event in Australia

National Rugby League Grand Final
- The 2026 NRL Grand Final at Stadium Australia
- Sport: Rugby league
- Location: Sydney, New South Wales
- First meeting: 1908 (1998 NRL)
- Latest meeting: 2026
- Broadcasters: Nine Network
- Stadiums: Stadium Australia

Statistics
- Total meetings: 106
- Most wins: South Sydney Rabbitohs (17)

The NRL Grand Final is an annual rugby league match to determine the premiers of every National Rugby League season. It is a major sport event in Australia and regarded as the biggest showcase of rugby league football in the world. The two teams that play in the grand final are determined from the preceding finals series, where the top eight finishing teams on the season's premiership ladder qualify in a three-week playoff tournament. The match is currently played on the Sunday evening preceding Labour Day; it has been previously played on Saturday and Sunday afternoons. Since 1999, it has been contested at Stadium Australia in Sydney.

The grand final day schedule begins with the NRL State Championship match followed by the NRL Women's Premiership Grand Final which are both played throughout the afternoon. In the evening, the lead-up to the grand final match starts with a ceremony of retiring players followed by a headline musical act. After both teams enter the field a Welcome to Country is conducted, and a rendition of the Australian national anthem is sung by well-known Australasian and international artists. The Provan–Summons Trophy, the NRL's premiership trophy, is usually delivered to the field by an Australian Army helicopter sometime before kick off. At the conclusion of the grand final there is a presentation ceremony where the winning team are awarded premiership rings. The player judged to be the man of the match by the selectors of the ARL national team is awarded the prestigious Clive Churchill Medal; the ARLC chairman, NRL CEO, and on occasion the Prime Minister of Australia are typically on stage to congratulate the winning coach and players, and ultimately hand the Provan–Summons Trophy to the winning captain(s).

In 2019, the Government of New South Wales secured the grand final for Stadium Australia until at least 2046.

== History ==
First grade rugby league in NSW began in 1908, the first premiership deciding game was played at the Royal Agricultural Society Showground, with Souths defeating Easts 14–12. From 1912 to 1925, no finals system was in place; however, in 1916, 1922, 1923 and 1924, a match was played as a tiebreaker to decide the season's premiership winner. From 1926 to 1953, finals were played under the Argus system, which produced a deciding game in two slightly differing ways.

All of these deciding games are now deemed to be grand finals, whether they were referred to as such at the time or not. From 1954 to the present, using a variety of systems, the deciding match has been explicitly termed a grand final, and no distinction is made between grand finals played under the auspices of the various governing bodies.

For the 1999 Grand Final, the fixture was moved from Sydney Football Stadium to the newly built Stadium Australia and set the record for the highest attendance at an Australian rugby league game, with 107,999 people attending.

From 2001, the grand final was moved to an evening start to make the most of prime time television. In 2008, a compromise was reached between official broadcaster Nine Network's preferred starting time of 7pm and the traditional starting time of 3pm, with the grand final beginning at 5pm AEDT. In 2013, the evening start resumed and has occurred since. Previously, the grand final did not have a set date but, with the exception of 2020, since 2001, it has been played the Sunday falling between 30 September and 6 October, preceding the Labour Day public holiday that falls on the first Monday of October in New South Wales.

== Stadiums ==
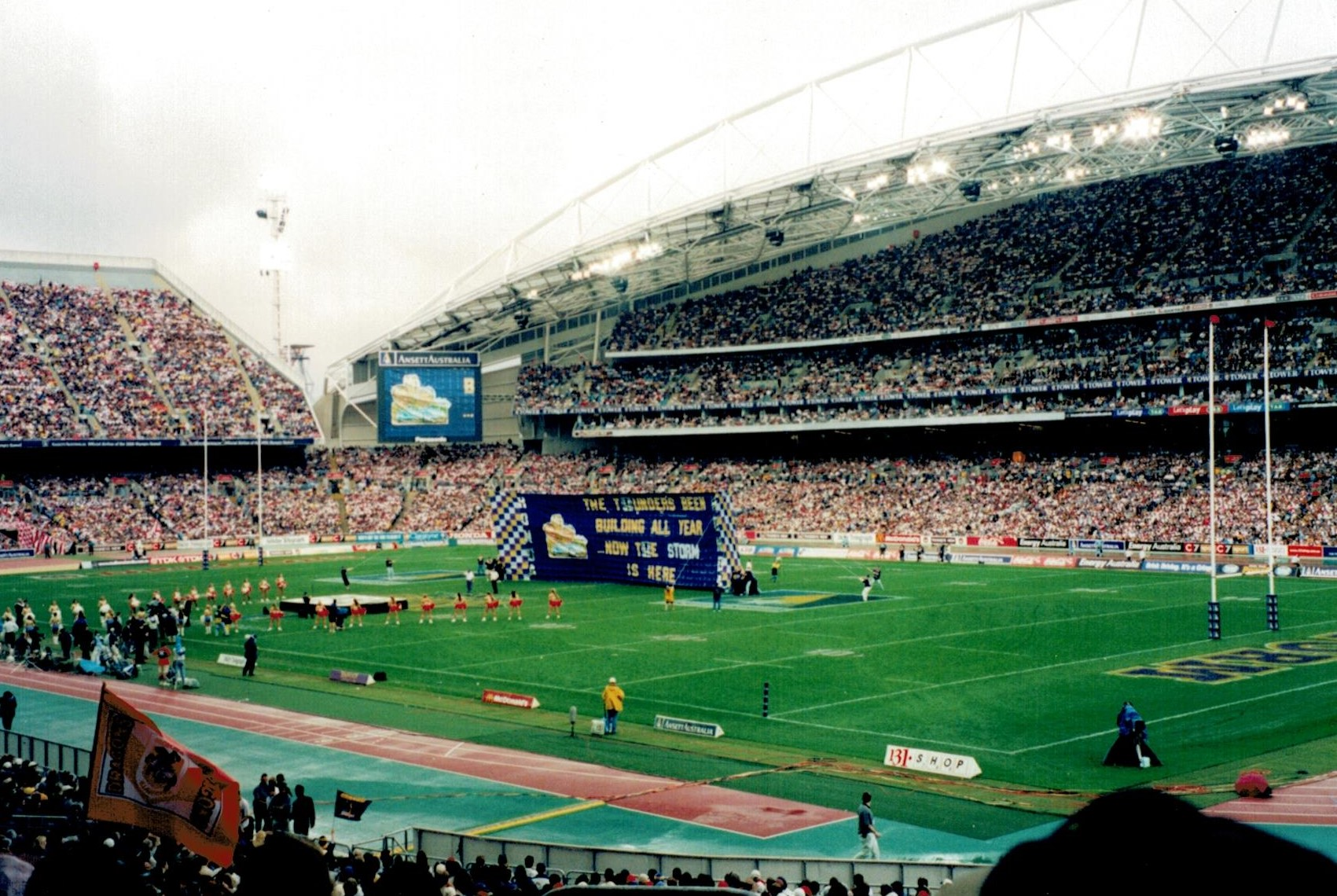
Stadium Australia hosted its first NRL Grand Final in 1999, where the Melbourne Storm claimed their first premiership victory by defeating the St. George Illawarra Dragons with a penalty try.

The NRL Grand Final is traditionally held in Sydney, as most NRL clubs are based in there and the current venue for the grand final, Stadium Australia is the second highest capacity stadium in Australia, after the Melbourne Cricket Ground.

It was announced in June 2019 that the 2020 and 2021 Grand Finals would be played at the Sydney Cricket Ground, while Stadium Australia underwent redevelopment. However, after the Government of New South Wales scrapped plans to redevelop Stadium Australia in July 2020, the matches would return to being planned at Stadium Australia until at least 2046.

In 2021, the NRL Grand Final was played at Lang Park in Brisbane, as it was not possible for the match to be played at Stadium Australia due to the COVID-19 lockdown in New South Wales. It was the first major rugby league grand final to be played in Queensland since the 1997 Super League grand final.

| City | Stadium | Years |
|---|---|---|
| (Australia) Brisbane | Queensland Sport & Athletics Centre | 1997 (SL) |
| (Australia) Brisbane | Lang Park | 2021 |
| (Australia) Sydney | Sydney Cricket Ground | 1908–1987 |
| (Australia) Sydney | Sydney Football Stadium | 1988–1998 |
| (Australia) Sydney | Stadium Australia | 1999–2020, 2022– |

== Qualification for World Club Challenge ==
The winners of the grand final qualify to play the winners of the Super League Grand Final in the World Club Challenge.

== Trophy and awards ==
=== Provan–Summons Trophy ===
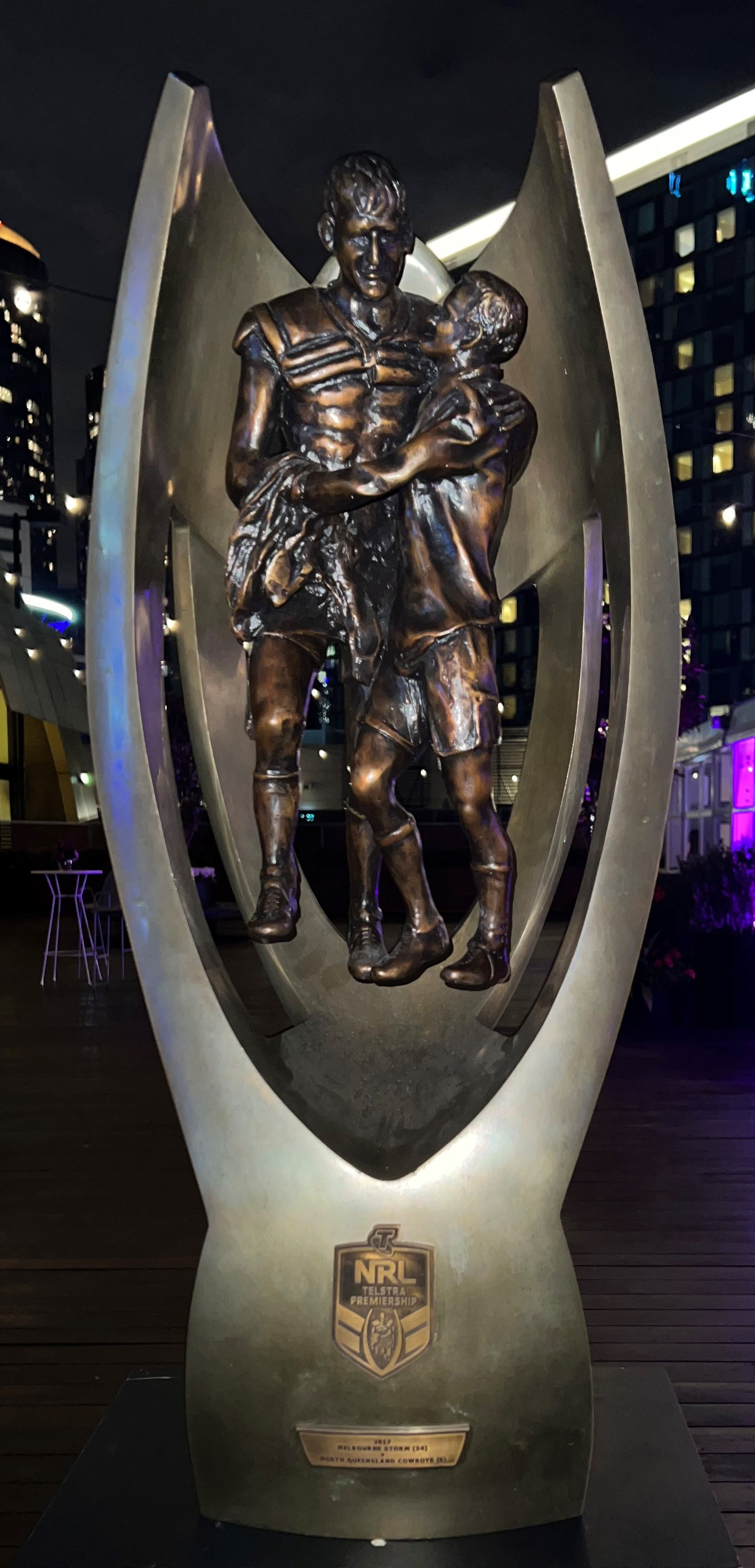
The Provan–Summons Trophy (2017 edition pictured)

The Provan–Summons Trophy is the NRL's main prize, awarded to the team that wins the premiership. Its sculptured design is similar to the Winfield Cup trophy, which was introduced for the 1982 NSWRFL season. It is a three-dimensional cast of a famous photo called The Gladiators, which depicts a mud-soaked Norm Provan of St. George and Arthur Summons of Western Suburbs embracing after the 1963 NSWRFL season's grand final. It was not officially named the Provan–Summons Trophy until 2013, the 50th anniversary of the 1963 grand final. The trophy is awarded following each grand final to the captain of the winning club.

=== Clive Churchill Medal ===
The Clive Churchill Medal is the award given to the player judged to be man-of-the-match in the National Rugby League's annual grand final. The award was created to honour Clive Churchill, one of the greatest rugby league players in Australian history, following his death in 1985. A prestigious honour in the NRL, the medal's recipient is chosen by the selectors of the Australian national team and announced and awarded to the player judged best and fairest on the ground at every post-grand final ceremony.

The Clive Churchill Medal has been awarded ever since the 1986 NSWRL season when its first recipient was Parramatta's Peter Sterling. The only three players to have won the award more than once are Canberra's Bradley Clyde (1989 and 1991), Melbourne Storm's Billy Slater (2009 and 2017) and Penrith Panthers' Nathan Cleary (2021 and 2023). In 2010, the Melbourne Storm were stripped of the 2007 and 2009 premierships due to salary cap breaches exposed by the NRL, however the Clive Churchill Medallists from those years still continue to be recognised.

=== Premiership rings ===
The NRL present premiership rings for the players and coach of grand final winning sides. After the 2004 NRL Grand Final which was won by the Bulldogs, one of their players, Johnathan Thurston gave his premiership ring to teammate Steve Price who missed the decider due to injury. The Melbourne Storm were stripped of their premierships in 2007 and 2009, but the players involved in those premierships were still allowed to keep their premiership rings. In 2014 NRL premiership ring was worth $8000 made by Zed N Zed Jewellery. Since 2015, Affinity Diamonds have produced the NRL premiership rings

=== Prize money ===
Prize money of AUD$400,000 is awarded to the victorious club.

However the amount is probably not reflective of the magnitude of participating in the event. It is often assumed simply that the winner of the premiership typically experiences an increase in revenue through increases in membership and merchandise sales.

== Results ==
The following is a list of Grand Finals in the NRL era (1998–present).

| Season | Date | Winners | Score | Runners up | Venue | Attendance | Clive Churchill Medal |
|---|---|---|---|---|---|---|---|
| 1998 | 27 Sep | Brisbane Broncos | 38–12 | Canterbury-Bankstown Bulldogs | Sydney Football Stadium | 40,857 | Gorden Tallis |
| 1999 | 26 Sep | Melbourne Storm | 20–18 | St. George-Illawarra Dragons | Stadium Australia | 107,999 | Brett Kimmorley |
| 2000 | 27 Aug | Brisbane Broncos | 14–6 | Sydney Roosters | Stadium Australia | 94,277 | Darren Lockyer |
| 2001 | 30 Sep | Newcastle Knights | 30–24 | Parramatta Eels | Stadium Australia | 90,414 | Andrew Johns |
| 2002 | 6 Oct | Sydney Roosters | 30–8 | New Zealand Warriors | Stadium Australia | 80,130 | Craig Fitzgibbon |
| 2003 | 5 Oct | Penrith Panthers | 18–6 | Sydney Roosters | Stadium Australia | 81,166 | Luke Priddis |
| 2004 | 3 Oct | Canterbury-Bankstown Bulldogs | 16–13 | Sydney Roosters | Stadium Australia | 82,127 | Willie Mason |
| 2005 | 2 Oct | Wests Tigers | 30–16 | North Queensland Cowboys | Stadium Australia | 82,453 | Scott Prince |
| 2006 | 1 Oct | Brisbane Broncos | 15–8 | Melbourne Storm | Stadium Australia | 79,609 | Shaun Berrigan |
| 2007* | 30 Sep | ~~Melbourne Storm~~* | 34–8 | Manly-Warringah Sea Eagles | Stadium Australia | 81,392 | Greg Inglis |
| 2008 | 5 Oct | Manly-Warringah Sea Eagles | 40–0 | Melbourne Storm | Stadium Australia | 80,388 | Brent Kite |
| 2009* | 4 Oct | ~~Melbourne Storm~~* | 23–16 | Parramatta Eels | Stadium Australia | 82,538 | Billy Slater |
| 2010 | 3 Oct | St. George-Illawarra Dragons | 32–8 | Sydney Roosters | Stadium Australia | 82,334 | Darius Boyd |
| 2011 | 2 Oct | Manly-Warringah Sea Eagles | 24–10 | New Zealand Warriors | Stadium Australia | 81,988 | Glenn Stewart |
| 2012 | 30 Sep | Melbourne Storm | 14–4 | Canterbury-Bankstown Bulldogs | Stadium Australia | 82,976 | Cooper Cronk |
| 2013 | 6 Oct | Sydney Roosters | 26–18 | Manly-Warringah Sea Eagles | Stadium Australia | 81,491 | Daly Cherry-Evans |
| 2014 | 5 Oct | South Sydney Rabbitohs | 30–6 | Canterbury-Bankstown Bulldogs | Stadium Australia | 83,833 | Sam Burgess |
| 2015 | 4 Oct | North Queensland Cowboys | 17–16 | Brisbane Broncos | Stadium Australia | 82,758 | Johnathan Thurston |
| 2016 | 2 Oct | Cronulla-Sutherland Sharks | 14–12 | Melbourne Storm | Stadium Australia | 83,625 | Luke Lewis |
| 2017 | 1 Oct | Melbourne Storm | 34–6 | North Queensland Cowboys | Stadium Australia | 79,722 | Billy Slater |
| 2018 | 30 Sep | Sydney Roosters | 21–6 | Melbourne Storm | Stadium Australia | 82,688 | Luke Keary |
| 2019 | 6 Oct | Sydney Roosters | 14–8 | Canberra Raiders | Stadium Australia | 82,922 | Jack Wighton |
| 2020 | 25 Oct | Melbourne Storm | 26–20 | Penrith Panthers | Stadium Australia | 37,303^{1} | Ryan Papenhuyzen |
| 2021 | 3 Oct | Penrith Panthers | 14–12 | South Sydney Rabbitohs | Lang Park | 39,322^{1} | Nathan Cleary |
| 2022 | 2 Oct | Penrith Panthers | 28–12 | Parramatta Eels | Stadium Australia | 82,415 | Dylan Edwards |
| 2023 | 1 Oct | Penrith Panthers | 26–24 | Brisbane Broncos | Stadium Australia | 81,947 | Nathan Cleary |
| 2024 | 6 Oct | Penrith Panthers | 14–6 | Melbourne Storm | Stadium Australia | 80,156 | Liam Martin |
| 2025 | 5 Oct | Brisbane Broncos | 26–22 | Melbourne Storm | Stadium Australia | 80,223 | Reece Walsh |
| 2026 | 4 Oct | Sydney Roosters | 19–18 | Newcastle Knights | Stadium Australia | 80,814 | James Tedesco |

*Melbourne Storm were stripped of their 2007 and 2009 premierships, as well as their 2006, 2007 and 2008 minor premierships, due to salary cap breaches.

^{1}Reduced crowd due to stadium capacity restrictions

The 2021 Grand Final was held in Brisbane for the first time in the competition's history due to an ongoing COVID-19 lockdown in New South Wales, which prompted the NRL to relocate it from Stadium Australia in Sydney, where every NRL Grand Final since 1999 had been hosted.

Due to COVID-19 restrictions, the match was attended by only 39,322 spectators because the Government of Queensland limited Lang Park to seventy-five percent of its maximum capacity.

=== Winners ===
| | Club | Wins | Winning years | Runners-up | Runners-up years | Total Grand Finals |
|---|---|---|---|---|---|---|
| 1 | Sydney Roosters | 5 | 2002, 2013, 2018, 2019, 2026 | 4 | 2000, 2003, 2004, 2010 | 9 |
| 1 | Penrith Panthers | 5 | 2003, 2021, 2022, 2023, 2024 | 1 | 2020 | 6 |
| 3 | Melbourne Storm | 4 | 1999, 2012, 2017, 2020 | 6 | 2006, 2008, 2016, 2018, 2024, 2025 | 12 |
| 3 | Brisbane Broncos | 4 | 1998, 2000, 2006, 2025 | 2 | 2015, 2023 | 6 |
| 5 | Manly-Warringah Sea Eagles | 2 | 2008, 2011 | 2 | 2007, 2013 | 4 |
| 6 | Canterbury-Bankstown Bulldogs | 1 | 2004 | 3 | 1998, 2012, 2014 | 4 |
| 6 | North Queensland Cowboys | 1 | 2015 | 2 | 2005, 2017 | 3 |
| 6 | St George Illawarra Dragons | 1 | 2010 | 1 | 1999 | 2 |
| 6 | South Sydney Rabbitohs | 1 | 2014 | 1 | 2021 | 2 |
| 6 | Newcastle Knights | 1 | 2001 | 1 | 2026 | 2 |
| 6 | Wests Tigers | 1 | 2005 | 0 | | 1 |
| 6 | Cronulla-Sutherland Sharks | 1 | 2016 | 0 | | 1 |
| 13 | Parramatta Eels | 0 | | 3 | 2001, 2009, 2022 | 3 |
| 13 | New Zealand Warriors | 0 | | 2 | 2002, 2011 | 2 |
| 13 | Canberra Raiders | 0 | | 1 | 2019 | 1 |

- Melbourne Storm wins in 2007 and 2009 were subsequently annulled

The Gold Coast Titans and Dolphins are the only teams currently competing in the competition who have not featured in a Grand Final since the start of the NRL (1998).

== Notable grand finals ==
1909 – South Sydney win the premiership by forfeit over Balmain. There was an agreement that both sides would play the match; however, Balmain never showed up, and South Sydney kicked off to a side that did not turn up, scored a try and were declared premiers.

1924 – Balmain defeat South Sydney 3–0 at the Sydney Cricket Ground in the lowest-scoring grand final of all time.

1943 – Newtown defeat North Sydney 34–7 at the Sydney Cricket Ground in front of a then record crowd of 60,922. This grand final would be North Sydney's final appearance in a decider before exiting the competition in 1999 and also Newtown's last premiership before their exclusion at the end of 1983.

1952 – Western Suburbs defeated South Sydney 22–10. The match was remembered due to its controversy with claims the referee George Bishop had put a big wager on Western Suburbs winning the game. Souths claimed that they were denied two fair tries and Wests had scored one try off a blatant knock on. Western Suburbs player Hec Farrell was sent off in the second half of the match. This would prove to be the last premiership Western Suburbs would win as a stand-alone entity before exiting the competition in 1999. South Sydney captain-coach Jack Rayner reportedly never spoke to George Bishop following the grand final, even though both men lived in the same suburb of Sydney for years after the match.

1956 – St. George beat Balmain to claim the first of a world record 11 straight premierships.

1963 – St. George beat Western Suburbs 8–3 in a match famous for the iconic 'Gladiators' photo of Norm Provan and Arthur Summons covered in mud. It is also notable for a controversial try scored by Dragons winger Johnny King. Wests players tackled him and believed him to be held; however, the referee ruled play on.

1965 – A then record crowd of 78,056 packed into the Sydney Cricket Ground to see St. George captain Norm Provan play his last NSWRFL game. It was also St. George's 10th straight premiership.

1966 – St. George win their 11th straight premiership, at the time a world record in any football code.

1969 – Balmain win a controversial grand final 11–2 over South Sydney. The game causes controversy due to Balmain's lay down tactics.

1975 – Eastern Suburbs beat St. George by a then record 38–0 score line. St. George fullback Graeme Langlands plays the game in white boots and has a painkiller injection go wrong.

1977 – St. George and Parramatta play out the first drawn grand final, 9-all after extra time. They come back the next week for a grand final replay and St. George win 22–0.

1978 – Manly and Cronulla play out the second consecutive drawn grand final, 11–11. There is no extra time and the replay is played on the following Tuesday, won by Manly 16–0.

1987 – Manly defeat Canberra 18–8 in the last grand final played at the Sydney Cricket Ground.

1989 – Known by many as the best grand final ever—a year coincidentally believed to be the greatest by some, Canberra come from 14–2 down to beat Balmain 19–14 in extra time. Canberra became the first team outside of NSW to win the competition.

1992 – The Brisbane Broncos defeat St. George 28–8 to become the first Queensland team to win the grand final.

1997 – Newcastle winger Darren Albert scored a try with six seconds left to deliver Newcastle their first ever premiership, 22–16 over Manly.

1997 (SL) – Brisbane defeat Cronulla for their third premiership in the Super League grand final. This was the first night grand final, the first top level rugby league grand final to be played outside of Sydney before a record crowd for any sporting event in Queensland of 58,912.

1999 – A record crowd of 107,999 watch the two newest clubs Melbourne Storm and St George Illawarra Dragons battle it out. St. George Illawarra led 18–14 before a late penalty try to Melbourne winger Craig Smith gave the Storm a 20–18 win to become the first Victorian team to win a NRL premiership and the quickest NRL club to win their first-ever premiership, which they accomplished in only their second season.

2001 – Newcastle win the first night grand final in Sydney, 30–24 over Parramatta.

2002 – Pre-game entertainment Billy Idol arrived on ground on board a hovercraft, but due to technical issues – "waiting for some power" – he did not perform. It was also the first year that a New Zealand–based team played in a grand final, making this the first Trans-Tasman grand final.

2005 – Wests Tigers five-eighth Benji Marshall throws a magic flick pass to winger Pat Richards as the Tigers become the first joint venture to win the premiership, 30–16 over the North Queensland Cowboys.

2006 – Security and police kick out multiple fans for a brawl during the match.

2008 – Manly-Warringah Sea Eagles secure a record 40–0 win over Melbourne Storm.

2011 – Lights at the stadium accidentally go out, causing the post-game ceremony to become delayed.

2014 – South Sydney Rabbitohs win their first premiership in 43 years, beating Canterbury-Bankstown Bulldogs 30–6, with Clive Churchill Medallist Sam Burgess playing almost the entirety of the match with a broken cheekbone and eye socket after sustaining the injuries in the first tackle of the match.

2015 – The North Queensland Cowboys' first premiership after 21 seasons in the NRL and widely regarded as one of the all-time best (along with the Raiders' 1989 win). The first all-Queensland NRL grand final sparked talk of future deciders being held in Queensland. It was also notable as Brisbane Broncos ended their biggest drought from a grand final since entering the competition (in 1988) and it was Bennett's first season back in Brisbane after leaving in 2008. North Queensland Cowboys winger Kyle Feldt scored a try from a Michael Morgan try-assist after the full-time siren to level the game at 16–16. After Johnathan Thurston missed the sideline conversion, hitting the right post, the match went to golden point extra time, the first grand final to do so. The Kyle Feldt kick-off to begin golden point was dropped by the Broncos' Ben Hunt. From the ensuing set of six, Thurston kicked the winning field goal, and he was subsequently awarded the Clive Churchill Medal. It also ended Brisbane's undefeated streak in grand finals, having won all six previous deciders.

2016 – Cronulla-Sutherland Sharks win their first premiership in their 50th season by defeating Melbourne Storm 14–12. This was also only their fourth grand final appearance since entering the competition in 1967. Their other grand final appearances came in 1973, 1978 and 1997 Super League Grand Final. The Sharks won only one of their final five regular-season games. However, it was enough to break through for their inaugural premiership.

2019 – Sydney Roosters become the first team to win back-to-back premierships in 26 years by defeating the Canberra Raiders 14–8. The last team to achieve successive premierships in a unified competition was the Brisbane Broncos in 1992–93. The Roosters' win did not come without any controversy during the game. In the third minute, a Luke Keary kick was charged down, only for the ball to ricochet off the head of the Roosters' trainer who was on the field at the time; a scrum feed was then awarded to the Roosters, and 3 minutes later Roosters' Sam Verrills scored a try adjacent to the goalposts. The Raiders then started to dominate the match, with their five-eighth Jack Wighton scoring a try in the 31st minute. Roosters' Cooper Cronk was sent to the sin bin for 10 minutes for a professional foul (tackling a player not in possession of the football). With a man down, the Roosters' defence was stoic; despite numerous attacks, the Raiders were unable to score. The 72nd minute saw what was arguably one of the most controversial moments in a rugby league match (let alone for a NRL grand final): A Jack Wighton bomb kick saw the ball bounce off the shoulder off a Raiders player (who was contesting the ball against the Roosters' fullback James Tedesco) and the ball bounced back to the Raiders. Initially, the head referee Ben Cummins believed that the ball was touched by Tedesco and subsequently Cummins called that the Raiders had another set of six tackles while the ball was still in play; however, Cummins was quickly notified by other match officials that the Roosters had not touched the ball, and, as such, the Raiders were still on their last tackle. Wighton was tackled, and despite his protests to the referees, handed the ball over to the Roosters. Four tackles later, the Roosters ran 80 metres, the ball passing between Keary, Latrell Mitchell, Daniel Tupou, and finally Tedesco, who scored the match-winning try.

2020 – Contested on 25 October, three weeks later than originally scheduled due to the season being suspended during the COVID-19 pandemic.

2021 – The NRL Grand Final was played at Suncorp Stadium in Brisbane, the first time ever outside of Sydney, as it was not possible for the match to be played at Stadium Australia due to the COVID-19 lockdown in New South Wales.

2023 – Penrith Panthers become the first team in 40 years, and the first in the modern NRL era, to win three premierships in a row (2021, 2022 and 2023). This rare feat is known as a three-peat. This grand final is remembered for the biggest comeback ever in an NRL grand final, with Penrith down 24–8 with 18 minutes remaining to go on to win 26–24 thanks to a Nathan Cleary try and conversion in the 77th minute.

2024 – Penrith Panthers become the first team in 58 years, and the first in the modern NRL era, to win four premierships in a row (2021, 2022 and 2023 and 2024). This hyper-rare feat is known as a four-peat.

== Kickoff times ==
| Time | Years |
|---|---|
| 3pm | 1908–2000 |
| 5pm | 2008–2012 |
| 6:30pm | 2021** |
| 7pm | 1997*, 2002–2007 |
| 7:30pm | 2013–2020, 2022–present |
| 8pm | 2001 |

*The 1997 Super League grand final was a nighttime match.

**The 2021 NRL Grand Final was played at Suncorp Stadium and kicked off at a time of 6:30pm local time (7:30pm in New South Wales/Victoria) due to daylight savings time.

== Television broadcast ==
The match is always broadcast on free-to-air television in Australia, with live rights currently held by the Nine Network. Exclusive replay rights for the 12 hours following the game are held by subscription channel Fox League and streaming service Kayo Sports.

Figures for broadcasts were originally measured across the five metropolitan areas (Melbourne, Adelaide, Perth, Brisbane and Sydney) from 2001 to 2023. However, following changes to the TV ratings measurement system in Australia in 2024, metropolitan figures were replaced by a new nationwide 'Total TV' figure, which includes regional and broadcaster video on demand (BVOD) streaming numbers in a single figure.

Australian metropolitan television viewers
| Year | Viewers | Rank | Network | Ref. |
|---|---|---|---|---|
| 1998 | —N/a | | Nine Network | |
| 1999 | —N/a | | Nine Network | |
| 2000 | —N/a | | Nine Network | |
| 2001 | 2.097 million | 17 | Nine Network | |
| 2001 | 2.177 million | 10 | Nine Network | |
| 2002 | 2.352 million | 8 | Nine Network | |
| 2004 | 2.107 million | 13 | Nine Network | |
| 2005 | 2.563 million | 5 | Nine Network | |
| 2006 | 2.553 million | 7 | Nine Network | |
| 2007 | 2.422 million | 3 | Nine Network | |
| 2008 | 2.051 million | 10 | Nine Network | |
| 2009 | 2.528 million | 6 | Nine Network | |
| 2010 | 2.168 million | 14 | Nine Network | |
| 2011 | 2.172 million | 13 | Nine Network | |
| 2012 | 2.568 million | 11 | Nine Network | |
| 2013 | 2.240 million | 14 | Nine Network | |
| 2014 | 2.621 million | 4 | Nine Network | |
| 2015 | 2.458 million | 3 | Nine Network | |
| 2016 | 2.670 million | 4 | Nine Network | |
| 2017 | 2.310 million | 8 | Nine Network | |
| 2018 | 2.141 million | 4 | Nine Network | |
| 2019 | 1.868 million | 8 | Nine Network | |
| 2020 | 2.106 million | 4 | Nine Network | |
| 2021 | 2.206 million | 5 | Nine Network | |
| 2022 | 1.671 million | 9 | Nine Network | |
| 2023 | 2.045 million | | Nine Network | |

Australian total television viewers
| Year | Viewers | Rank | Network | Ref. |
|---|---|---|---|---|
| 1998 | —N/a | | Nine Network | |
| 1999 | —N/a | | Nine Network | |
| 2000 | —N/a | | Nine Network | |
| 2001 | Metro only recorded | | Nine Network | |
| 2002 | Metro only recorded | | Nine Network | |
| 2003 | 3.824 million | | Nine Network | |
| 2004 | Metro only recorded | | Nine Network | |
| 2005 | 4.103 million | | Nine Network | |
| 2006 | 2.560 million | | Nine Network | |
| 2007 | 3.748 million | | Nine Network | |
| 2008 | 3.050 million | | Nine Network | |
| 2009 | 3.490 million | | Nine Network | |
| 2010 | 3.100 million | | Nine Network | |
| 2011 | 3.178 million | | Nine Network | |
| 2012 | 3.958 million | | Nine Network | |
| 2013 | 3.928 million | | Nine Network | |
| 2014 | 3.986 million | 1 | Nine Network | |
| 2015 | 3.667 million | | Nine Network | |
| 2016 | 3.733 million | | Nine Network | |
| 2017 | 3.390 million | | Nine Network | |
| 2018 | 3.030 million | | Nine Network | |
| 2019 | 2.725 million | | Nine Network | |
| 2020 | 3.119 million | | Nine Network | |
| 2021 | 3.596 million | | Nine Network | |
| 2022 | 2.756 million | | Nine Network | |
| 2023 | 3.412 million | 7 | Nine Network | |
| 2024 | 3.381 million | 4 | Nine Network | |
| 2025 | 4.460 million | 1 | Nine Network | |
| 2026 | 4.286 million | TBA | Nine Network | |

NRL Grand Final Broadcasters
| Period | Free to Air Broadcaster | Subscription Replay |
|---|---|---|
| 1967 | Nine Network/Network 10/Seven Network/ABC | None |
| 1968–1974 | Nine Network/ABC | None |
| 1975–1982 | Seven Network/ABC | None |
| 1983–1991 | Network 10/ABC | None |
| 1992–1997 | Nine Network | None |
| 1997 (SL) | Nine Network | Fox Sports (broadcast the match live) |
| 1998–2016 | Nine Network | Fox Sports |
| 2017–present | Nine Network | Fox League, Kayo Sports |

== Audience ==
The 1999 NRL Grand Final saw a new rugby league world record crowd of 107,999, which was achieved at Stadium Australia. The attendance, which saw 67,142 more people attend than had done so for the 1998 NRL Grand Final at the Sydney Football Stadium the year before, broke the record attendance for a grand final by nearly 30,000 people, with the previous record of 78,065 being set in 1965 when St George defeated South Sydney 12–8 at the Sydney Cricket Ground.

The 2014 NRL Grand Final had a crowd of 83,833, which was the largest attendance at a sporting event at Stadium Australia since its 2001 reconfiguration saw its spectator capacity drop from 110,000 to 83,500.

== Entertainment ==
Early NRL grand finals featured a halftime show consisting of marching bands; but, as the popularity of the game increased, a trend started where popular singers and musicians performed during its pre-game ceremonies, and thus the modern halftime show emerged. Traditionally, the Australia's national anthem, "Advance Australia Fair", is sung before every match. When the New Zealand Warriors play, "God Defend New Zealand" is also sung.

=== NRL Grand Final Performers ===
| Year | Performer(s) |
|---|---|
| 1986 | Kylie Minogue and Jason Donovan |
| 1987 | John Williamson |
| 1988 | Glenn Shorrock |
| 1990 | John Farnham |
| 1991 | Village People |
| 1992 | Debbie Byrne, Jodie Gillies, Yothu Yindi and Peter Allen* |
| 1993 | Tina Turner |
| 1996 | The Delltones, Glenn Shorrock, Ross Wilson, Christine Anu, Kate Ceberano and Peter Allen* |
| 1997 (ARL) | Jimmy Barnes |
| 1997 (SL) | Jon Stevens and Olivia Newton-John |
| 1998 | Jimmy Barnes and David Campbell |
| 1999 | Jay Laga'aia, Thelma Houston, John Swan, Mark Gable, Angry Anderson, Rick Price, Genevieve Davis, Hugh Jackman, and Vanessa Amorosi |
| 2000 | Tom Jones |
| 2001 | Jimmy Barnes and Mahalia Barnes |
| 2002 | Billy Idol |
| 2003 | Meat Loaf, Hoodoo Gurus and Kelly Clarkson |
| 2004 | Grinspoon, Chris Isaak |
| 2005 | The Veronicas, Bodyjar and Pete Murray |
| 2006 | Hoodoo Gurus, INXS |
| 2007 | Hoodoo Gurus, Shannon Noll, Vanessa Amorosi |
| 2008 | The Living End and Jon Stevens |
| 2009 | Wolfmother, Wes Carr, The Script |
| 2010 | You Am I, Jessica Mauboy, Justice Crew Dan Sultan and Phil Jamieson |
| 2011 | Kelly Clarkson and Eskimo Joe |
| 2012 | Good Charlotte |
| 2013 | Ricky Martin and Jessica Mauboy |
| 2014 | Slash and Train |
| 2015 | Cold Chisel and Jessica Mauboy |
| 2016 | Keith Urban, Richie Sambora, Orianthi |
| 2017 | Macklemore |
| 2018 | Gang of Youths and Darryl Braithwaite |
| 2019 | OneRepublic, Darryl Braithwaite and Christine Anu |
| 2020 | Amy Shark |
| 2021 | Kate Miller-Heidke, Ian Moss, Stafford Brothers, Timmy Trumpet, William Barton |
| 2022 | Jimmy Barnes, Mahalia Barnes, Diesel, Josh Teskey, Emma Donovan, Sheldon Riley and Bliss n Eso |
| 2023 | Tina: The Tina Turner Musical and King Stingray |
| 2024 | The Kid Laroi |
| 2025 | Teddy Swims |
| 2026 | Amy Shark, Dave Gleeson, Phil Jamieson, Reuben Styles (of Peking Duk), and other members of Grinspoon and Teen Jesus and the Jean Teasers^{†} |

* Peter Allen died in June 1992 and appeared posthumously on video.
† It was reported that Tones and I would be the prematch entertainment performer, but a contract was never entered into between the NRL and management for Tones and I. Peter V‘landys announced a new act had been acquired but would not be revealed until the day of the match. A tribute to Jai Arrow was be performed by these singers.

== See also ==
- AFL Grand Final – Australian rules football premiership match
- Grand Final
- List of Australian rugby league grand final records
- List of NRL Grand finals
- List of NRL Premiers
- National Rugby League – Australasian rugby league football competition
- NRL Women's Grand Final – Australian women's rugby league championship game
- Super League Grand Final – Championship-deciding game of rugby league's Super League competition
