= Winfield Cup =

Australian rugby league trophy

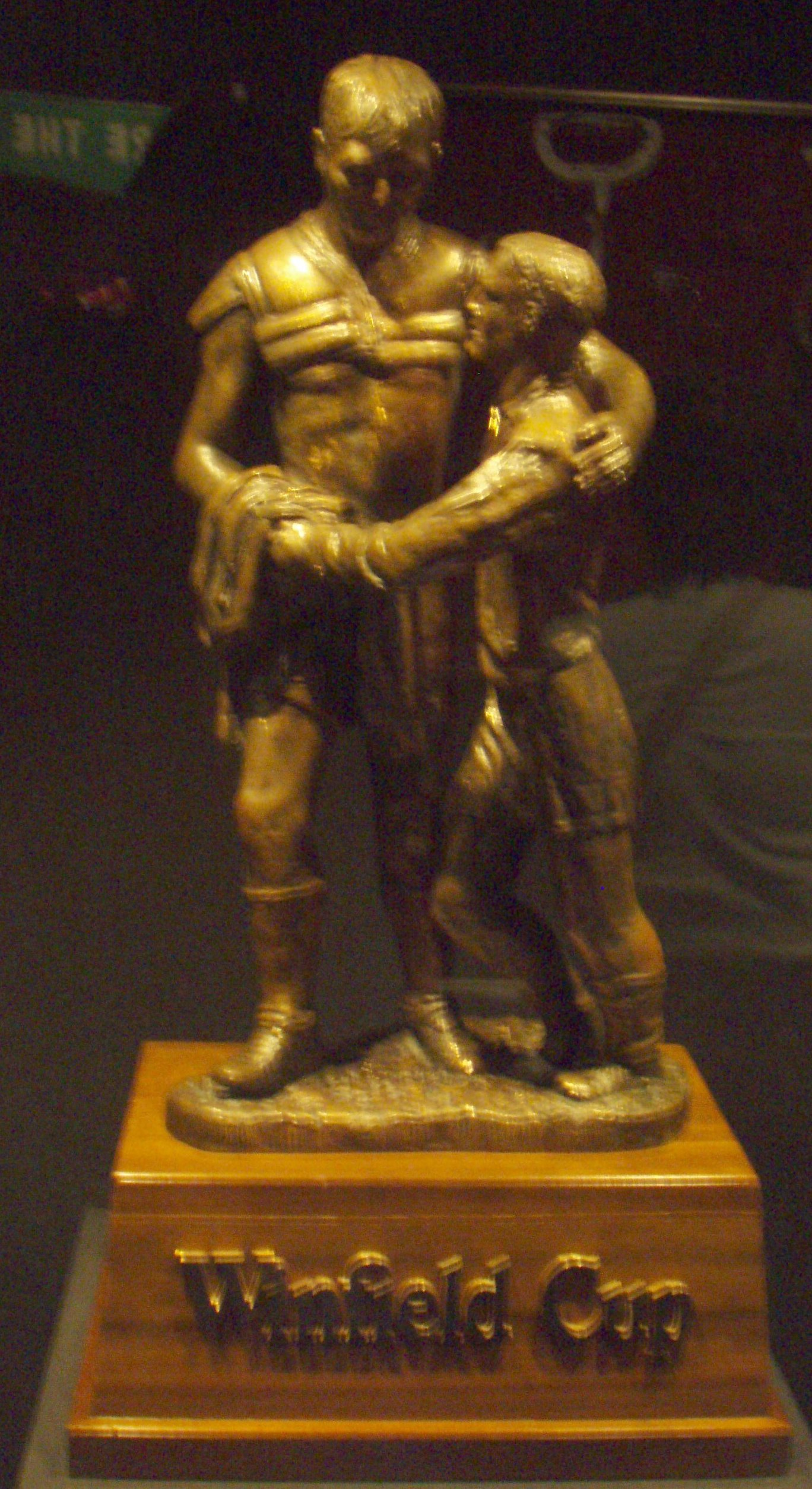
The Winfield Cup trophy

The Winfield Cup was an Australian rugby league trophy awarded to the winner of the New South Wales Rugby League premiership (NSWRL) Grand Final from 1982 to 1994, and then to the winner of the newly-founded Australian Rugby League (ARL) Grand Final in 1995.

Despite its name, the trophy was retired after the 1995 ARL season when cigarette manufacturer Winfield was forced to withdraw their sponsorship, following the Australian Federal Government's introduction of the Tobacco Advertising Prohibition Act 1992 which outlawed tobacco advertising in sports in Australia. Winfield were not the first tobacco company to sponsor the NSWRL Premiership, however; from 1960 to 1981 the pre-season competition was sponsored by W. D. & H. O. Wills.

A redesigned ARL premiership trophy, the Optus Cup, was introduced in 1996 and lasted until 1997 before the ARL and Super League merged to form the National Rugby League (NRL) in 1998.

== The Gladiators ==
The Winfield Cup trophy was a three-dimensional bronze cast of a famous photo called The Gladiators, which depicted a mud-soaked Norm Provan of St. George and Arthur Summons of Western Suburbs embracing after the 1963 Grand Final. This image became symbolic of the camaraderie and 'mateship' in rugby league and the present-day National Rugby League Premiership Trophy (which evolved from the Winfield Cup) uses a similar design. The sculpture itself was designed by New Zealand-born sculptor Alan Ingham (b. 1920 – 1994).

== Winners ==
Year	Winners	Runners-up	Final score	Minor Premiers
1982	Parramatta Eels	Manly-Warringah Sea Eagles	21–8	Parramatta Eels
1983	Parramatta Eels	Manly-Warringah Sea Eagles	18–6	Manly-Warringah Sea Eagles
1984	Canterbury-Bankstown Bulldogs	Parramatta Eels	6–4	Canterbury-Bankstown Bulldogs
1985	Canterbury-Bankstown Bulldogs	St. George Dragons	7–6	St. George Dragons
1986	Parramatta Eels	Canterbury-Bankstown Bulldogs	4–2	Parramatta Eels
1987	Manly-Warringah Sea Eagles	Canberra Raiders	18–8	Manly-Warringah Sea Eagles
1988	Canterbury-Bankstown Bulldogs	Balmain Tigers	24–12	Cronulla-Sutherland Sharks
1989	Canberra Raiders	Balmain Tigers	19–14	South Sydney Rabbitohs
1990	Canberra Raiders	Penrith Panthers	18–14	Canberra Raiders
1991	Penrith Panthers	Canberra Raiders	19–12	Penrith Panthers
1992	Brisbane Broncos	St. George Dragons	28–8	Brisbane Broncos
1993	Brisbane Broncos	St. George Dragons	14–6	Canterbury-Bankstown Bulldogs
1994	Canberra Raiders	Canterbury-Bankstown Bulldogs	36–12	Canterbury-Bankstown Bulldogs
1995	Sydney Bulldogs	Manly-Warringah Sea Eagles	17–4	Manly-Warringah Sea Eagles

== See also ==
- Rugby league in New South Wales
