= 1963 NSWRFL season =

Rugby league competition

1963 New South Wales Rugby Football League
- Teams: 10
- Premiers: St George (10th title)
- Minor premiers: St George (9th title)
- Matches played: 94
- Points scored: 2278
- Attendance: 1019748
- Top points scorer: Fred Griffiths (136)
- Wooden spoon: Eastern Suburbs (2nd spoon)
- Top try-scorer: Reg Gasnier (24)

The 1963 NSWRFL season was the 56th season of the New South Wales Rugby Football League premiership based in Sydney. Ten teams from across the city competed for the J J Giltinan Shield and WD & HO Wills Cup during the season, which culminated in a rematch of the previous two years' grand finals between St George and Western Suburbs.

== Teams ==
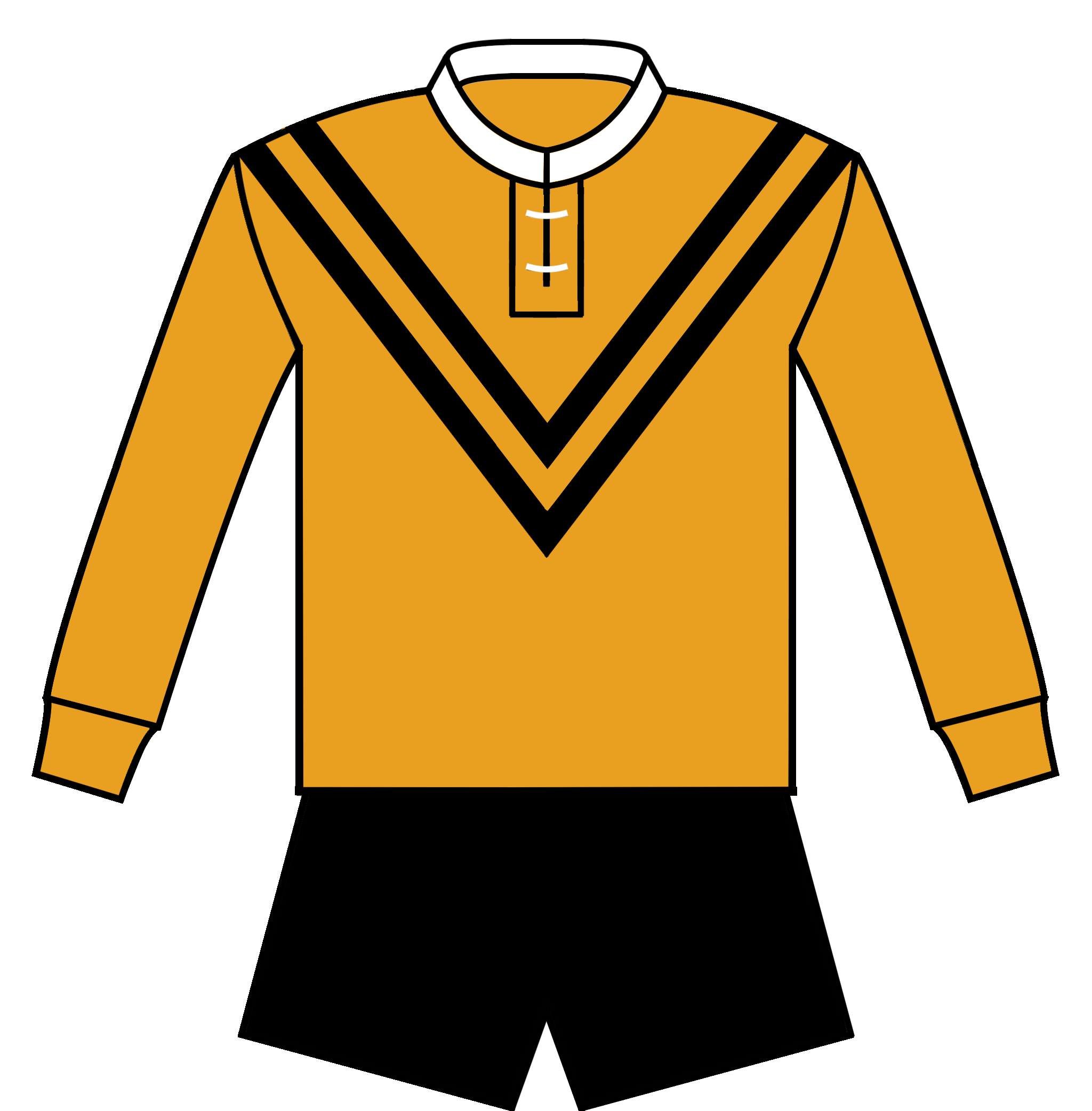
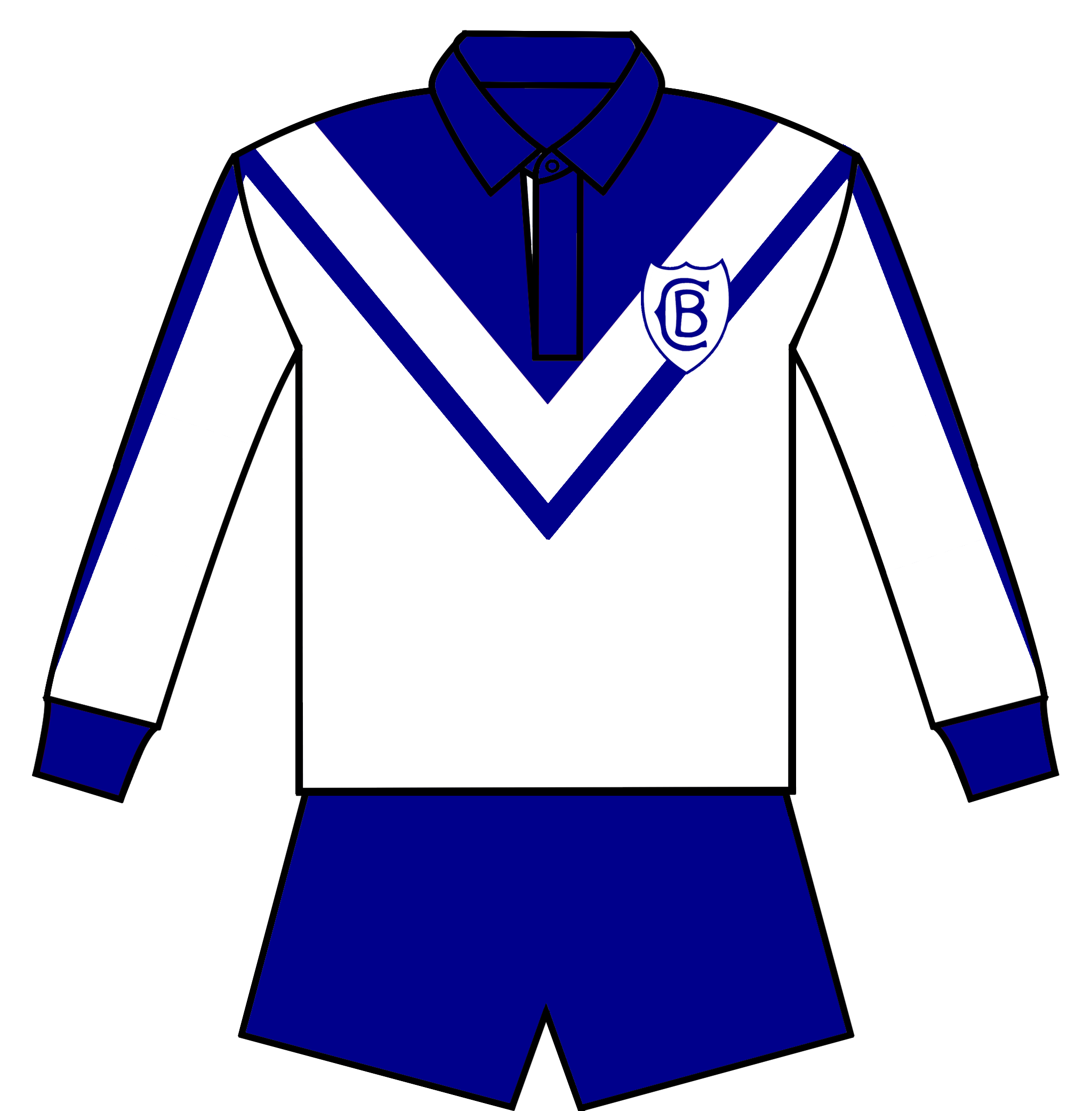
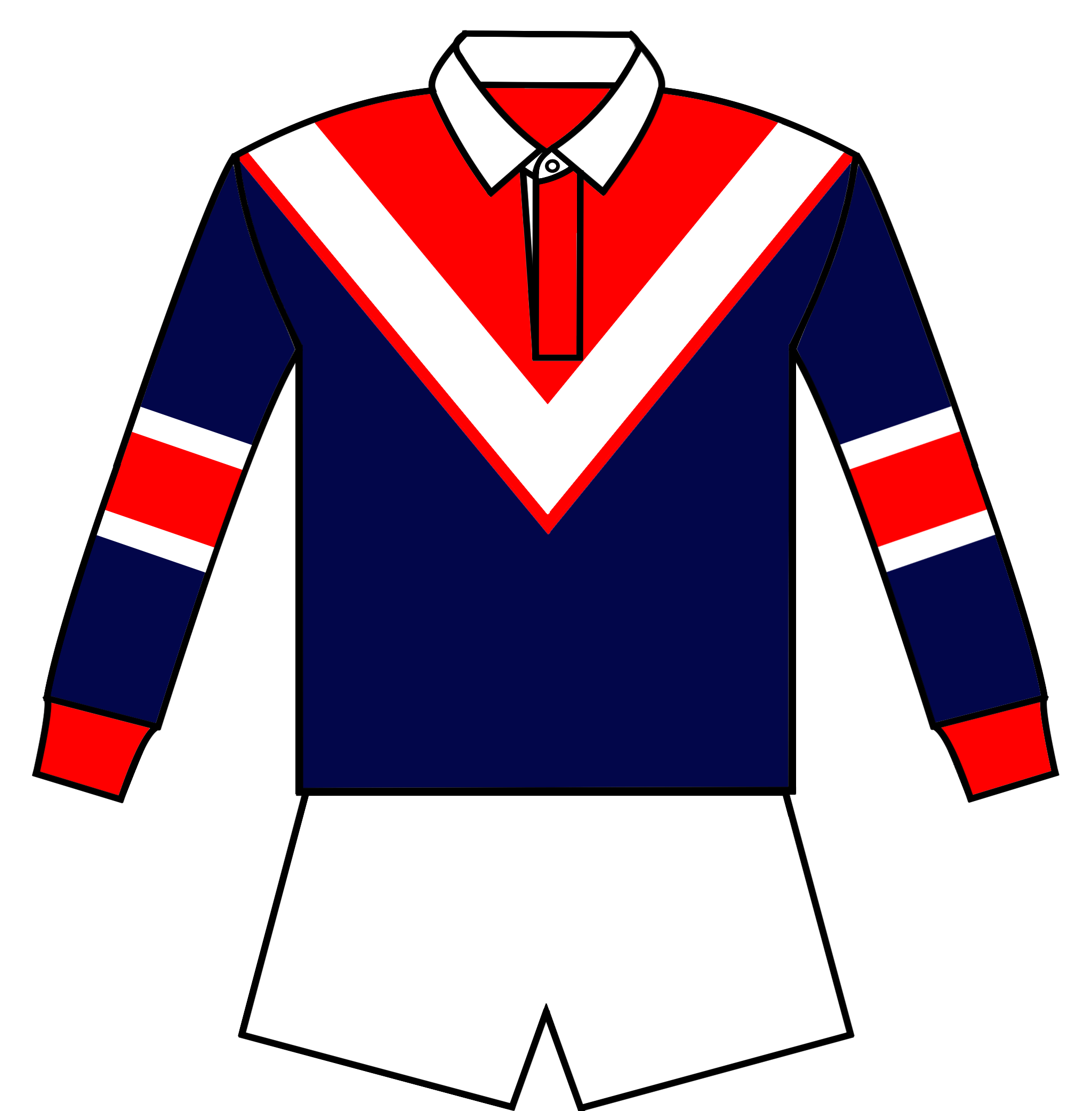
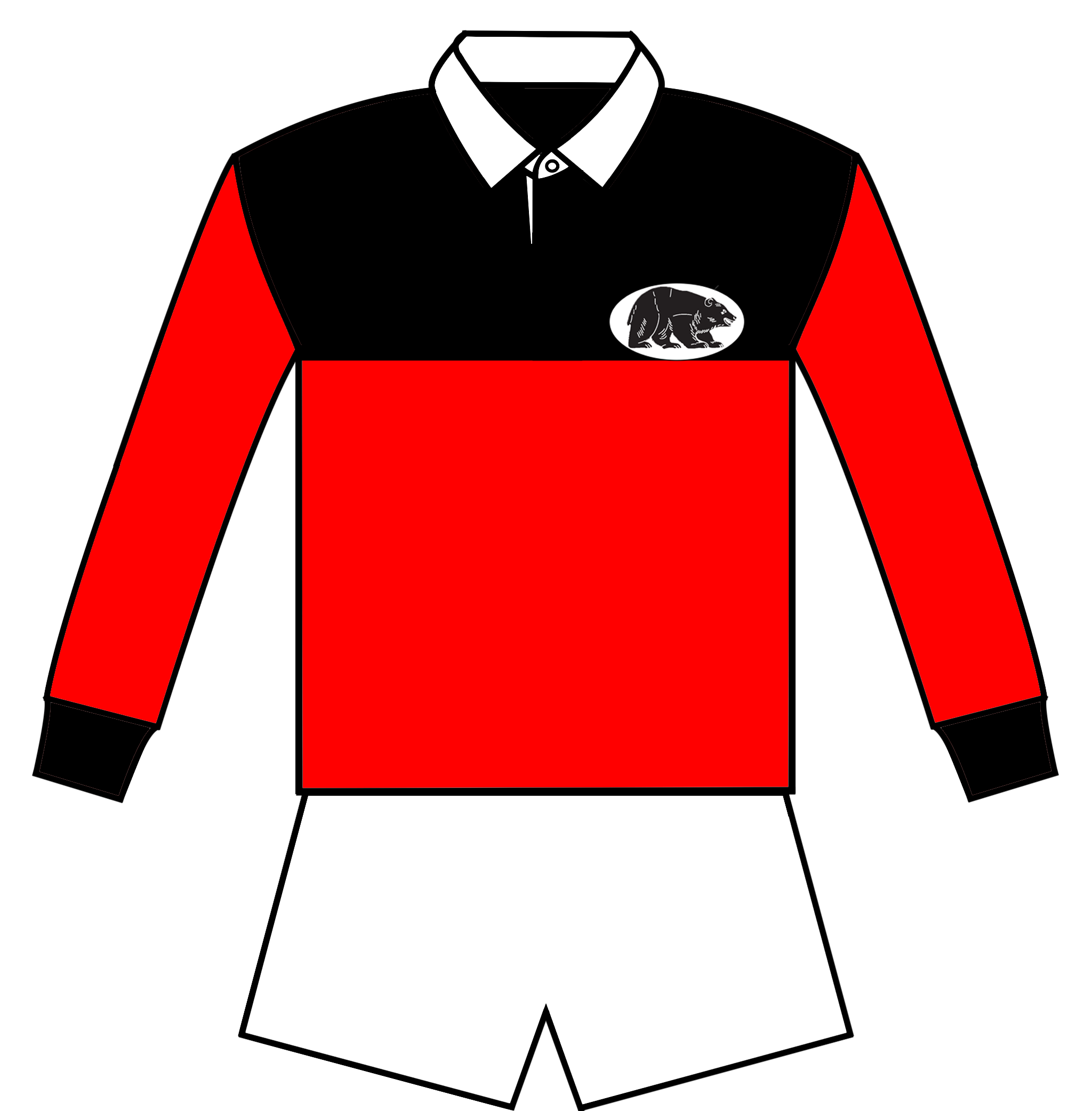
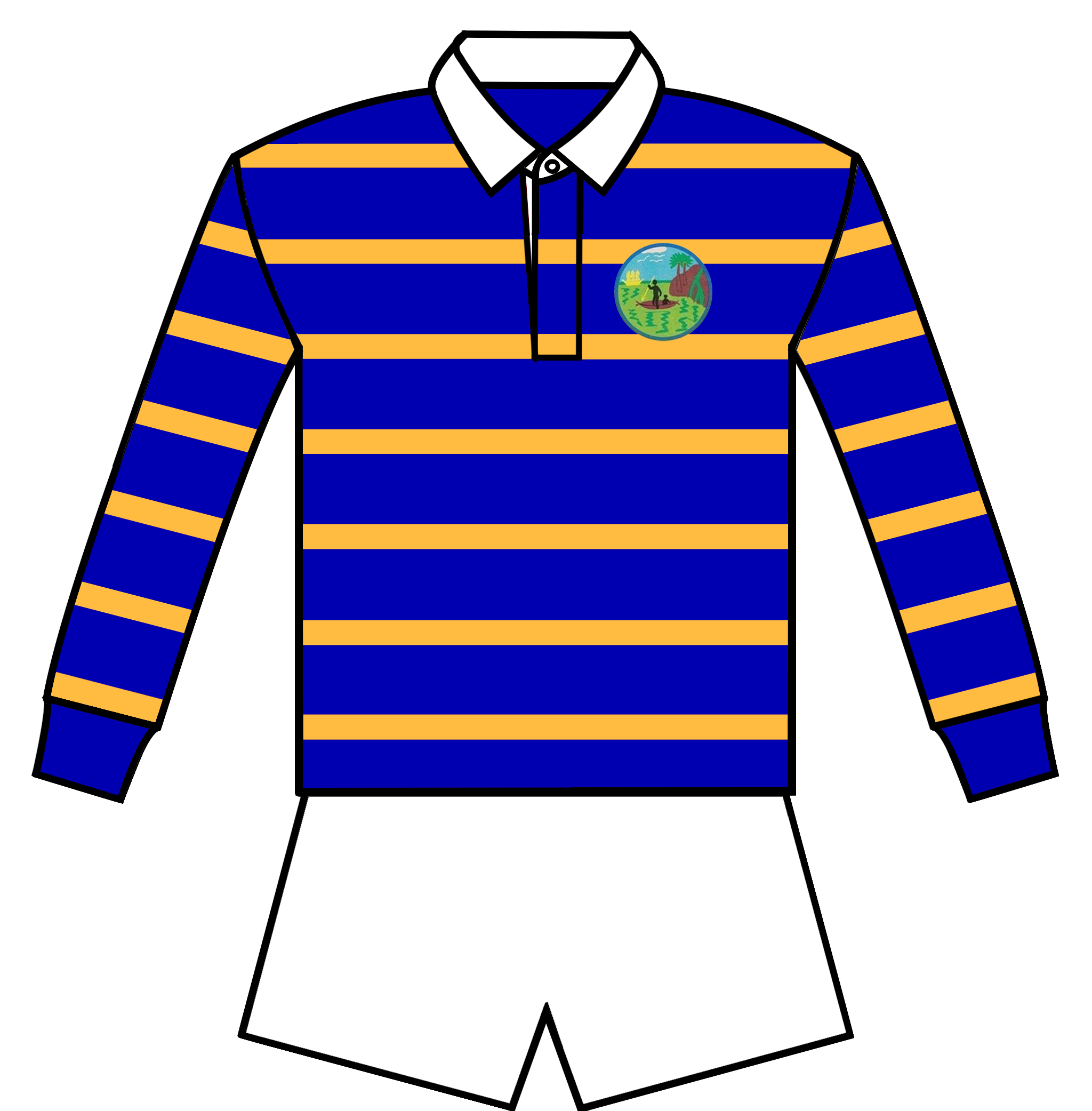
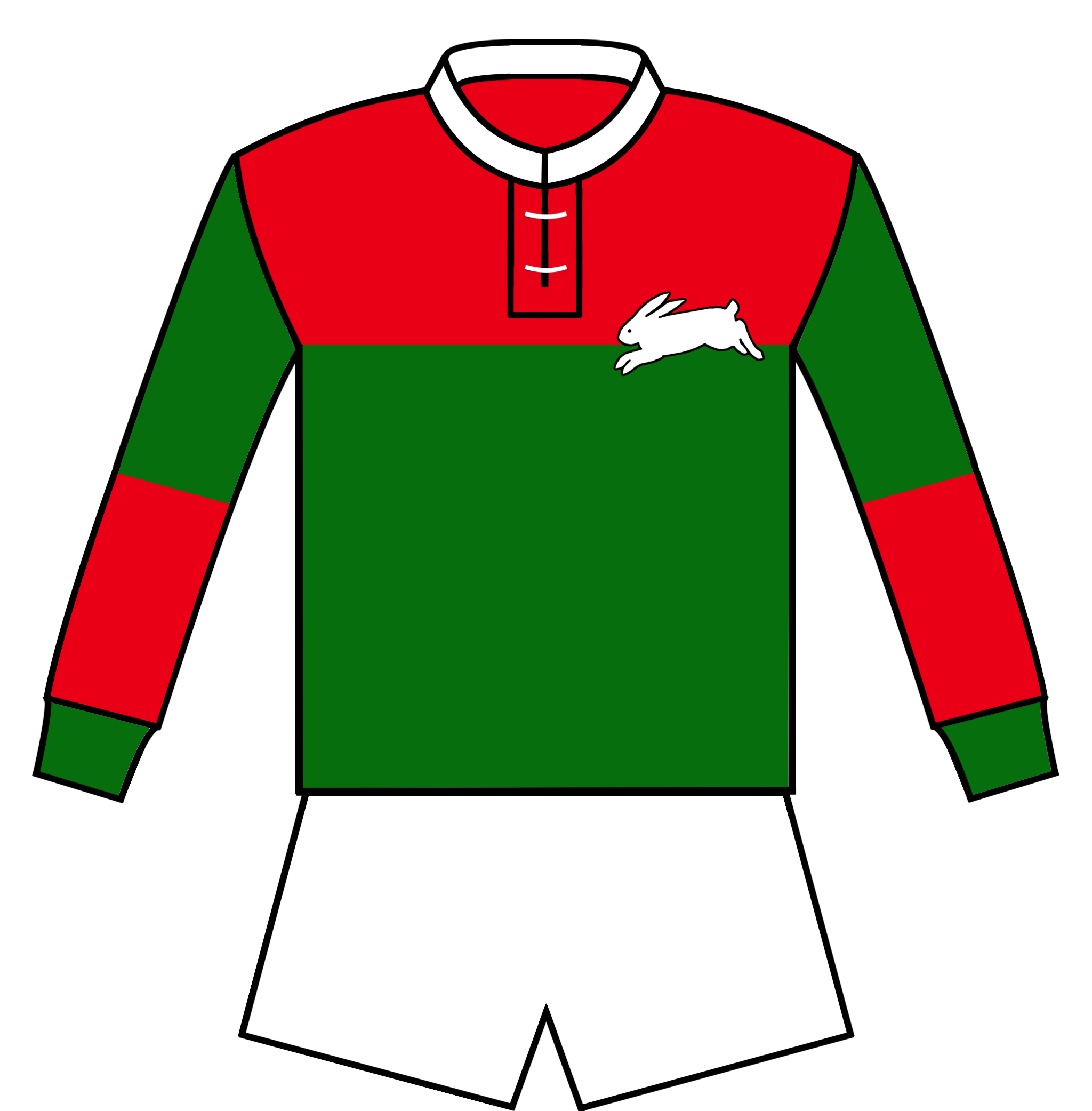
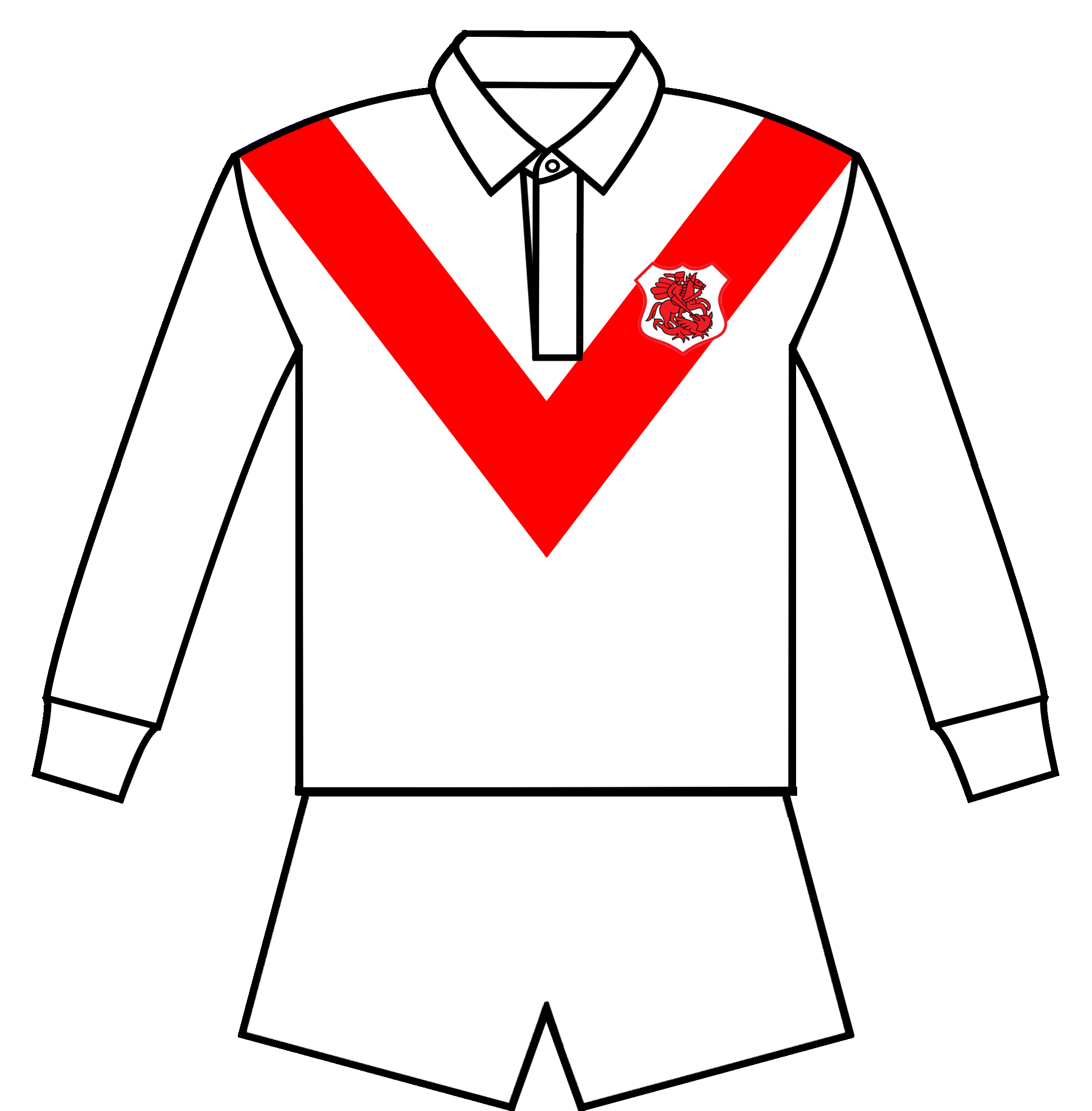
Balmain 57th season Ground: Leichhardt Oval; Coach: Harry Bath; Captain: Keith Barnes, Billy Bischoff Jr.	Canterbury-Bankstown 29th season Ground: Belmore Sports Ground; Coach: Clive Churchill; Captain: Ray Gartner	Eastern Suburbs 57th season Ground: Sydney Sports Ground; Coach: Dick Dunn; Captain: Terry Fearnley	Manly-Warringah 17th season Ground: Brookvale Oval; Captain-Coach: Tony Paskins	Newtown 57th season Ground: Henson Park; Coach: Allan Ellis; Captain: Tony Brown
North Sydney 57th season Ground: North Sydney Oval; Captain-Coach: Fred Griffiths	Parramatta 17th season Ground: Cumberland Oval; Coach: Ken Kearney; Captain: Ron Lynch	South Sydney 57th season Ground: Redfern Oval; Coach: Denis Donoghue; Captains: Darrel Chapman, Jim Lisle	St George 43rd season Ground: Jubilee Oval; Captain-coach: Norm Provan	Western Suburbs 57th season Ground: Pratten Park; Coach: Jack Fitzgerald; Captain: Arthur Summons

== Ladder ==
	Team	Pld	W	D	L	PF	PA	PD	Pts
1	St George	18	15	1	2	434	95	+339	31
2	Western Suburbs	18	14	0	4	256	160	+96	28
3	Balmain	18	12	0	6	246	183	+63	24
4	Parramatta	18	11	0	7	186	165	+21	22
5	North Sydney	18	10	0	8	272	236	+36	20
6	Manly	18	7	0	11	158	217	-59	14
7	Newtown	18	7	0	11	206	331	-125	14
8	Canterbury	18	6	1	11	170	277	-107	13
9	South Sydney	18	4	0	14	170	298	-128	8
10	Eastern Suburbs	18	3	0	15	116	252	-136	6

== Finals ==
Home	Score	Away	Match Information
Home	Score	Away	Date and Time	Venue	Referee	Crowd
Semi-finals
Balmain	7–9	Parramatta	3 August 1963	Sydney Cricket Ground	Darcy Lawler	39,408
St George	8–10	Western Suburbs	10 August 1963	Sydney Cricket Ground	Darcy Lawler	42,065
Preliminary Final
St George	12–7	Parramatta	17 August 1963	Sydney Cricket Ground	Darcy Lawler	57,973
Grand Final
Western Suburbs	3–8	St George	24 August 1963	Sydney Cricket Ground	Darcy Lawler	69,860

=== Grand Final ===
St. George	Position	Western Suburbs Magpies
13. Graeme Langlands	FB	1. Don Parish
12. Johnny King	WG	2. John Mowbray
11. Reg Gasnier	CE	3. Bob McGuinness
24. Billy Smith	CE	4. Gil MacDougall
9. Eddie Lumsden	WG	5. Peter Dimond
21. Bruce Pollard	FE	6. Arthur Summons (c)
7. George Evans	HB	7. Don Malone
1. Monty Porter	PR	13. Jack Gibson
2. Ian Walsh	HK	12. Noel Kelly
3. Kevin Ryan	PR	11. Denis Meaney
4. Norm Provan (Ca./Co.)	SR	14. Kel O'Shea
5. Elton Rasmussen	SR	9. John Hayes
6. Johnny Raper	LK	8. Kevin Smyth
	Coach	Jack Fitzgerald

The crowd of 69,806 who turned out for the grand final was a record. From the opening whistle the 1963 decider was a gruelling affair. Heavy rain meant that the wet SCG pitch quickly became a quagmire and players unrecognisable. At one point, St George five-eighth, Bruce Pollard was blinded by the mud such that he couldn't pass or catch the ball so he swapped places with Johnny Raper and played out the second half at lock. Raper also set up the best movement of the match when he broke the line and found Reg Gasnier in support. Gasnier, with a Wests defender hanging off him, sent the ball to Norm Provan who in turn found Johnny King. However, the Magpies defence held and no try was scored.

Saints conceded their first grand final try since 1958 when Wests centre Gil McDougall scored. As the match developed, it was clear that Wests had a game plan which involved a focus of intimidation on Gasnier. McDougall and other Magpies punched, stiff armed and kneed Gasnier at every opportunity. He was consequently subdued throughout the game.

The game was ultimately the Dragons' most controversial win in their 11-year run since the story has passed into Australian rugby league folklore that St George benefitted from dubious decisions made by referee Darcy Lawler.

Lawler, the game's No.1 referee was known to enjoy a bet. A number of Wests players and sports journalists have claimed that the 1963 Grand Final was a rout and point to some questionable decisions with Wests captain Arthur Summons claiming that before the game one of his team mates (later revealed to be Jack Gibson) entered the change room and told others that if they had backed themselves to win they had better lay off their bets because "The ref has backed St George". Just before half time, Wests had a try disallowed. At 8–3, McDougall had a chance to even the score when he won a race to the ball in goal, but Lawler ruled that he did not ground it. Later, with 15 minutes to go and the score favouring Saints 5–3, Johnny King scored a controversial match winning try. Both decisions fuelled the debate about Lawler's impartiality on the day. Lawler, who awarded St George the penalties 18–7, retired after the match.

"The Gladiators", John O'Gready's famous photograph of the two opposing captains, Norm Provan and Arthur Summons, taken after the match.

Newcomer Graeme Langlands passed to King who raced down his muddy wing after fending off his opposite John Mowbray. King appeared to be claimed by the cover defence of Don Parish but both players tumbled and in the slimy conditions King was not clearly held. He got up and was bowled over again but still not held and with no marker he ran towards the corner past a relaxed defence who believed he had been tackled. If ever there was an example of playing to the whistle, this was it. Johnny King scored one of the most debated tries in Australian Grand Final history. King claims that he was told by the referee to 'play on' while Wests legend, Noel Kelly claims that King was tackled and that Wests 'were robbed'. Behind the try line as the conversion was being lined up Chow Hayes yelled at Lawler "you're a cheat". Lawler said "Say that again and I will send you off". Jack Gibson said "send him off and I will rearrange your face on Monday". Lawler blushed and throughout the conversion Hayes continued to chant "you're a cheat".

But for the record books, St George won their eighth consecutive Grand Final, defeating a gallant Wests team, 8-3 and destroying Wests' hopes for the third year running. It was the final time that Western Suburbs would appear in a Grand Final. Also, St George won the premiership that year in all three grades.

The match is also celebrated in Australian rugby league history as a result of John O'Gready's enduring photo of rival captains Provan and Summons in a congratulatory mud-caked embrace at game's end. The award winning photo became known as "the Gladiators" and since it was first published has been appreciated by rugby league fans as capturing an essence of the game wherein a little man can fairly compete against the bigger man, and where sporting respect and camaraderie follow epic struggle. Since 1982 a bronze replica of the Provan and Summons embrace has adorned the various incarnations of the Australian rugby league premiership trophy.

St. George 8 (Tries: Evans, King. Goals: Gasnier 1.)

Western Suburbs 3 ( Tries: McDougall.)

== Player statistics ==
The following statistics are as of the conclusion of Round 18.

Top 5 point scorers

Points	Player	Tries	Goals	Field Goals
136	Fred Griffiths	2	65	0
122	Keith Barnes	4	55	0
99	Graeme Langlands	15	27	0
88	Reg Gasnier	22	11	0
87	Les Johns	3	39	0

Top 5 try scorers

Tries	Player
22	Reg Gasnier
16	Ken Irvine
15	Graeme Langlands
14	Johnny King
14	John Mowbray
14	Nick Yakich

Top 5 goal scorers

Goals	Player
65	Fred Griffiths
55	Keith Barnes
39	Don Parish
39	Les Johns
34	John Mullins
