= List of Australian rugby league grand final records =

This is a collection of Australian rugby league grand final records as of the end of the 2026 season.

== Premierships by team ==
Team	Years in competition	Winners	Runners-up	Years won	Years runner-up
South Sydney Rabbitohs	1908–1999, 2002–present	21	14	1908, 1909, 1914, 1918, 1925, 1926, 1927, 1928, 1929, 1931, 1932, 1950, 1951, 1953, 1954, 1955, 1967, 1968, 1970, 1971, 2014	1910, 1916, 1917, 1920, 1923, 1924, 1935, 1937, 1939, 1949, 1952, 1965, 1969, 2021
Sydney Roosters	1908–present	16	15	1911, 1912, 1913, 1923, 1935, 1936, 1937, 1940, 1945, 1974, 1975, 2002, 2013, 2018, 2019, 2026	1908, 1919, 1921, 1928, 1931, 1934, 1938, 1941, 1960, 1972, 1980, 2000, 2003, 2004, 2010
St George Dragons	1921–1998	15	12	1941, 1949, 1956, 1957, 1958, 1959, 1960, 1961, 1962, 1963, 1964, 1965, 1966, 1977, 1979	1927, 1930, 1933, 1942, 1946, 1953, 1971, 1975, 1985, 1992, 1993, 1996
Balmain Tigers	1908–1999	11	9	1915, 1916, 1917, 1919, 1920, 1924, 1939, 1944, 1946, 1947, 1969	1909, 1936, 1945, 1948, 1956, 1964, 1966, 1988, 1989
Manly Warringah Sea Eagles	1947–1999, 2003–present	8	11	1972, 1973, 1976, 1978, 1987, 1996, 2008, 2011	1951, 1957, 1959, 1968, 1970, 1982, 1983, 1995, 1997^{ARL}, 2007, 2013
Canterbury-Bankstown Bulldogs	1935–present	8	10	1938, 1942, 1980, 1984, 1985, 1988, 1995, 2004	1940, 1947, 1967, 1974, 1979, 1986, 1994, 1998, 2012, 2014
Brisbane Broncos	1988–present	7	2	1992, 1993, 1997^{SL}, 1998, 2000, 2006, 2025	2015, 2023
Penrith Panthers	1967–present	6	2	1991, 2003, 2021, 2022, 2023, 2024	1990, 2020
Melbourne Storm	1998–present	4	6	1999, ~~2007~~, ~~2009~~, 2012, 2017, 2020	2006, 2008, 2016, 2018, 2024, 2025
Parramatta Eels	1947–present	4	6	1981, 1982, 1983, 1986	1976, 1977, 1984, 2001, 2009, 2022
Western Suburbs Magpies	1908–1999	4	8	1930, 1934, 1948, 1952	1918, 1925, 1932, 1950, 1958, 1961, 1962, 1963
Canberra Raiders	1982–present	3	3	1989, 1990, 1994	1987, 1991, 2019
Newtown Jets	1908–1983	3	7	1910, 1933, 1943	1913, 1914, 1929, 1944, 1954, 1955, 1981
Newcastle Knights	1988–present	2	1	1997^{ARL}, 2001	2026
North Sydney Bears	1908–1999	2	1	1921, 1922	1943
Cronulla-Sutherland Sharks	1967–present	1	3	2016	1973, 1978, 1997^{SL}
North Queensland Cowboys	1995–present	1	2	2015	2005, 2017
St. George Illawarra Dragons	1999–present	1	1	2010	1999
Wests Tigers	2000–present	1	0	2005	–
Glebe Dirty Reds	1908–1929	0	4	–	1911, 1912, 1915, 1922
New Zealand Warriors	1995–present	0	2	–	2002, 2011
Sydney University	1920–1937	0	1	–	1926
Cumberland	1908	0	0	–	–
Newcastle Rebels	1908–1909	0	0	–	–
Annandale	1910–1920	0	0	–	–
Illawarra Steelers	1982–1998	0	0	–	–
Gold Coast Chargers	1988–1998	0	0	–	–
South Queensland Crushers	1995–1997	0	0	–	–
Perth Reds	1995–1997	0	0	–	–
Adelaide Rams	1997–1998	0	0	–	–
Hunter Mariners	1997	0	0	–	–
Northern Eagles	2000–2002	0	0	–	–
Gold Coast Titans	2007–present	0	0	–	–
Dolphins	2023–present	0	0	–	–
Perth Bears	2027–present	0	0	–	–

== Premiership frequency ==
Club	Years in competition	Seasons	Premierships	Runners-up	Strike rate (based on seasons in competition)	Average years per	
Club	Years in competition	Seasons	Premierships	Runners-up	Strike rate (based on seasons in competition)	Premiership	Grand final
St George Dragons	1921–1998	78	15	12	19.23%	5.20	2.89
Brisbane Broncos	1988–present	38	7	2	17.95%	5.57	4.33
South Sydney Rabbitohs	1908–1999, 2002–present	117	21	14	17.95%	5.57	3.34
Melbourne Storm	1998–present	29	4	6	13.79%	7.25	2.42 (Note: Melbourne have played in a total of 12 grand finals, winning 6, but were stripped of 2 wins for salary cap breaches.)
Sydney Roosters	1908–present	119	16	15	13.45%	7.44	3.84
Balmain Tigers	1908–1999	92	11	9	11.96%	8.36	4.60
Manly Warringah Sea Eagles	1947–1999, 2003–present	77	8	11	10.39%	9.63	4.05
Penrith Panthers	1967–present	60	6	2	10.00%	10.00	7.50
Canterbury-Bankstown Bulldogs	1935–present	92	8	10	8.70%	11.50	5.11
Canberra Raiders	1982–present	45	3	3	6.67%	15.00	7.50
Newcastle Knights	1988–present	39	2	1	5.13%	19.50	13.00
Parramatta Eels	1947–present	80	4	6	5.00%	20.00	8.00
Western Suburbs Magpies	1908–1999	92	4	8	4.35%	23.00	7.67
Newtown Jets	1908–1983	76	3	7	3.95%	25.33	7.60
Wests Tigers	2000–present	27	1	0	3.70%	27.00	27.00
St George Illawarra Dragons	1999–present	27	1	1	3.57%	28.00	14.00
North Queensland Cowboys	1995–present	32	1	2	3.13%	32.00	10.67
North Sydney Bears	1908–1999	92	2	1	2.17%	46.00	30.67
Cronulla-Sutherland Sharks	1967–present	60	1	3	1.67%	60.00	15.00
Glebe Dirty Reds	1908–1929	22	0	4	—	—	5.50
New Zealand Warriors	1995–present	31	0	2	—	—	16.00
Sydney University	1920–1937	18	0	1	—	—	18.00
Cumberland	1908	1	0	0	—	—	—
Hunter Mariners	1997	1	0	0	—	—	—
Newcastle Rebels	1908–1909	2	0	0	—	—	—
Adelaide Rams	1997–1998	2	0	0	—	—	—
South Queensland Crushers	1995–1997	3	0	0	—	—	—
Perth Reds	1995–1997	3	0	0	—	—	—
Northern Eagles	2000–2002	3	0	0	—	—	—
Dolphins	2023–present	4	0	0	—	—	—
Annandale	1910–1920	11	0	0	—	—	—
Gold Coast Chargers	1988–1998	11	0	0	—	—	—
Illawarra Steelers	1982–1998	17	0	0	—	—	—
Gold Coast Titans	2007–present	20	0	0	—	—	—

== Premiership droughts ==
=== Current club premiership droughts ===
^{+} Club has not yet won a premiership

Club	Seasons	Start	Grand final appearances during drought
Brisbane Broncos	1	2025	—
Canberra Raiders	32	1994	2019
Canterbury-Bankstown Bulldogs	22	2004	2012, 2014
Cronulla-Sutherland Sharks	10	2016	—
Dolphins	4	2023^{+}	—
Gold Coast Titans	20	2007^{+}	—
Manly Warringah Sea Eagles	15	2011	2013
Melbourne Storm	6	2020	2024, 2025
New Zealand Warriors	32	1995^{+}	2002, 2011
Newcastle Knights	25	2001	2026
North Queensland Cowboys	11	2015	2017
Parramatta Eels	40	1986	2001, 2009, 2022
Penrith Panthers	2	2024	—
South Sydney Rabbitohs	12	2014	2021
St. George Illawarra Dragons	16	2010	—
Sydney Roosters	0	2026	—
Wests Tigers	21	2005	—

== Biggest winning margin ==
Margin	Premiers	Score	Runners up	Match
40	Manly-Warringah Sea Eagles	40 – 0	Melbourne Storm	2008 NRL Grand Final
38	Eastern Suburbs Roosters	38 – 0	St. George Dragons	1975 NSWRFL Grand Final
32	North Sydney Bears	35 – 3	Glebe Dirty Reds	1922 NSWRFL Final
29	Balmain Tigers	33 – 4	South Sydney Rabbitohs	1939 NSWRFL Grand Final
28	South Sydney Rabbitohs	42 – 14	Manly-Warringah Sea Eagles	1951 NSWRFL Grand Final
28	Melbourne Storm	34 – 6	North Queensland Cowboys	2017 NRL Grand Final

== Most points scored by a team ==
Points	Premiers	Score	Runners up	Match
42	South Sydney Rabbitohs	42 – 14	Manly-Warringah Sea Eagles	1951 NSWRFL Grand Final
40	Manly-Warringah Sea Eagles	40 – 0	Melbourne Storm	2008 NRL Grand Final
38	Eastern Suburbs Roosters	38 – 0	St. George Dragons	1975 NSWRFL Grand Final
38	Brisbane Broncos	38 – 12	Canterbury Bulldogs	1998 NRL grand final
36	Canberra Raiders	36 – 12	Canterbury-Bankstown Bulldogs	1994 NSWRL Grand Final
34	Melbourne Storm	34- 6	North Queensland Cowboys	2017 NRL Grand Final

== Highest scoring grand finals ==
Total points	Premiers	Score	Runners up	Match
56	South Sydney Rabbitohs	42 – 14	Manly-Warringah Sea Eagles	1951 NSWRFL Grand Final
54	Newcastle Knights	30 – 24	Parramatta Eels	2001 NRL Grand Final
50	Brisbane Broncos	38 – 12	Canterbury Bulldogs	1998 NRL Grand Final
50	Penrith Panthers	26 – 24	Brisbane Broncos	2023 NRL Grand Final
48	Canberra Raiders	36 – 12	Canterbury-Bankstown Bulldogs	1994 NSWRL Grand Final
48	Brisbane Broncos	26 – 22	Melbourne Storm	2025 NRL Grand Final

== Lowest scoring grand finals ==
Total points	Premiers	Score	Runners up	Match
3	Balmain Tigers	3 – 0	South Sydney Rabbitohs	1924 NSWRFL Premiership Final
6	Parramatta Eels	4 – 2	Canterbury-Bankstown Bulldogs	1986 NSWRL Grand Final
8	Newtown Bluebags	4 – 4	South Sydney Rabbitohs	1910 NSWRFL Final
8	Balmain Tigers	5 – 3	South Sydney Rabbitohs	1916 NSWRFL Final
10	Canterbury-Bankstown Bulldogs	6 – 4	Parramatta Eels	1984 NSWRL Grand Final

Notes

- Newtown were declared premiers due to their minor premiership in 1910.
- The 1910 and 1986 grand finals have been the only tryless grand finals to date.

== Most grand final appearances by a player ==
Player	Team(s)	Appearances	Grand finals
Norm Provan	St. George Dragons	11	1953, 1956, 1957, 1958, 1959, 1960, 1961, 1962, 1963, 1964, 1965
Brian Clay	Newtown Jets St. George Dragons	10	1954, 1955, 1957, 1958, 1959, 1960, 1961, 1964, 1965, 1966
Eddie Lumsden	St. George Dragons	9	1957, 1958, 1959, 1961, 1962, 1963, 1964, 1965, 1966
Ron Coote	South Sydney Rabbitohs, Eastern Suburbs Roosters	9	1965, 1967, 1968, 1969, 1970, 1971, 1972, 1974, 1975
Cooper Cronk	Melbourne Storm, Sydney Roosters	9	2006, 2007, 2008, 2009, 2012, 2016, 2017, 2018, 2019

== Most grand finals hosted by a venue ==
Stadium	City	Grand finals hosted
Sydney Cricket Ground	Sydney, New South Wales	53
Stadium Australia (also known as Telstra Stadium and ANZ Stadium)	Sydney, New South Wales	27
Sydney Football Stadium (also known as Allianz Stadium)	Sydney, New South Wales	11
Sydney Sports Ground	Sydney, New South Wales	11
RAS Showground (also known as Moore Park Showground)	Sydney, New South Wales	6
QEII Stadium (also known as ANZ Stadium)	Brisbane, Queensland	1
Lang Park (also known as Suncorp Stadium)	Brisbane, Queensland	1

== Highest attended grand finals ==
Attendance	Stadium	Premiers	Score	Runners up	Match
107,999	Stadium Australia	Melbourne Storm	20 – 18	St. George Illawarra Dragons	1999 NRL Grand Final
94,277	Stadium Australia	Brisbane Broncos	14 – 6	Sydney Roosters	2000 NRL Grand Final
90,414	Stadium Australia	Newcastle Knights	30 – 24	Parramatta Eels	2001 NRL Grand Final
83,833	ANZ Stadium	South Sydney Rabbitohs	30 – 6	Canterbury-Bankstown Bulldogs	2014 NRL Grand Final
83,625	ANZ Stadium	Cronulla-Sutherland Sharks	14 – 12	Melbourne Storm	2016 NRL Grand Final

== Most grand finals refereed ==
Referee	Appearances	Grand finals
Bill Harrigan	10	1989, 1990, 1991, 1997^{SL}, 1998, 1999, 2000, 2001, 2002, 2003
Darcy Lawler	8	1953, 1956, 1957, 1958, 1959, 1960, 1961, 1963
Jack O'Brien	7	1940, 1942, 1943, 1944, 1947, 1951, 1954
Gerard Sutton	7	2014, 2015, 2017, 2018, 2019, 2020, 2021
Lal Deane	6	1928, 1929, 1930, 1931, 1932, 1936
Col Pearce	6	1955, 1964, 1965, 1966, 1967, 1968
Tony Archer	6	2007, 2008, 2009, 2010, 2011, 2012
