= John Hayes (rugby league) =

Australian rugby league player (1939–2023)

Personal information
- Full name: John Thomas Hayes
- Born: 25 May 1939 Marrickville, New South Wales, Australia
- Died: 24 September 2023 (aged 84)

Playing information
- Position: Second-row, Prop, Hooker
Club
Years	Team	Pld	T	G	FG	P
1961–70	Western Suburbs	160	14	0	0	42
Representative
Years	Team	Pld	T	G	FG	P
1961	New South Wales	2	0	0	0	0

Coaching information
Club
Years	Team	Gms	W	D	L	W%
1983–84	North Sydney	50	22	2	26	44

John "Chow" Hayes (25 May 1939 – 24 September 2023) was an Australian professional rugby league footballer who played in the 1960s and 1970s. He played for Western Suburbs in the NSWRL competition, as a prop, hooker or second-row.

== Early life ==
John Hayes was born in Marrickville and left school at 14 to pursue a career in panel beating and also as a professional rugby league footballer. He played his junior rugby league with a number of clubs most notably Granville where he caught the attention of Western Suburbs.

== Playing career ==
Hayes made his first grade debut against Newtown in 1961 at Henson Park which Wests won 25–15. In the same year, Hayes played in the 1961 grand final defeat against St George. Hayes was also selected to play for New South Wales in 1961, featuring in two matches. In the following two years, Western Suburbs played against St George again in the grand final losing on both occasions with Hayes featuring in those matches. The 1963 grand final is remembered for the wet and muddy conditions the players competed in and for the photograph of Norm Provan and Arthur Summons embracing at full time which later became an enduring image of rugby league. There were also accusations that the referee had taken a bribe before the match and stood to earn 600 pounds if St George were to win but this allegation was never proven. Hayes played a further eight seasons and retired at the end of 1970.

== Post playing ==
Hayes coached the Wests reserve grade side in the early 1970s and then coached North Sydney between 1983 and 1984. Hayes later became a Chief Inspector in the NSW Police Force and was inducted as a life member at Western Suburbs.

John Hayes died on 24 September 2023, at the age of 84.

Sporting positions
Preceded by Ron Willey; 1980-1982	Coach North Sydney; 1983-1984	Succeeded by Greg Hawick; 1985
