= Bob McGuinness =

Australian rugby league footballer

Personal information
- Full name: Robert Kenneth McGuinness
- Born: 10 August 1942 Concord, New South Wales, Australia
- Died: 20 April 2014 (aged 71) Chinderah, New South Wales, Australia

Playing information
- Position: Centre, Five-eighth
Club
Years	Team	Pld	T	G	FG	P
1962–68	Western Suburbs	92	5	1	0	27
- Source: As of 9 May 2019

Bob McGuinness (1942–2014) was an Australian rugby league footballer who played in the 1960s. He played for Western Suburbs in the New South Wales Rugby League (NSWRL) competition.

== Background ==
McGuinness grew up at Cabarita Junction, he went to Homebush Boys High and played his junior football with Homebush United, before being graded by Western Suburbs at the age of 18.

== Playing career ==
McGuinness made his first grade debut for Western Suburbs in 1962. Western Suburbs would go on the reach the grand final that year against St George which was a rematch from the previous seasons decider. Western Suburbs would go on to lose the match 9–6 at the Sydney Cricket Ground. In 1963, Western Suburbs reached the grand final for the third consecutive year against St George. McGuinness played at centre as St George won the match 8–3. The game was remembered due to the muddy conditions both sets of players had to endure and for St George player Norm Provan and Wests player Arthur Summons embracing at full time.

In the following years, Western Suburbs failed to reach the finals but McGuinness stayed loyal to the club and left at the end of 1968. McGuinness then joined Port Kembla on the South Coast and later signed with Gerringong with whom he won the 1972 South Coast premiership as captain-coach.
