= Grand Finale =

Grande Finale, Grand Final, Grande Final, Grand Finale, may refer to:

== Events ==
- Grand Finale (Cassini), the final phase of the Cassini orbiter mission to Saturn
- Grande Finale, Jackson County Apple Festival, Jackson, Jackson County, Ohio, USA; the concluding parade of the annual festival
- The Grande Finale, Miss Universe Nepal; the final competition segment
- The Grand Finale, an annual fundraiser by the Polish charity Great Orchestra of Christmas Charity

=== Sport ===
- Grand final, a game that decides a sports league's premiership (or championship) winning team
- Grand Finale (V8 Supercars), the name given to the final round of the V8 Supercar Championship Series from 2004 to 2008
- Grande Finale Attijariwafabank, 2009 Alps Tour; a golf tournament in Morocco
- AFL Women's Grand Final, women's Australian-rules football annual match in Australia
- AFL Grand Final, Australian Football League Australian-rules football annual match in Australia
- WAFL Grand Final, Australian-rules football Western Australia Football League premiership game in Western Australia
- NRL Grand Final, Australian rugby league National Rugby League annual match in Australia
- NBL Grand Final, Australian basketball annual National Basketball League championship series
- Super League Grand Final, British rugby league Super League championship game in England
- Challenge Tour Grand Final, men's professional golf tournament
- LETAS Grand Finale, women's professional golf tournament
- Players Championship Grand Final, the finale of the Players Tour Championship in snooker

== Music ==
- Grand finale in a piece of music composition
- Grande Finale, Festival 500, St. John's, Newfoundland, Canada; the concluding concert at the annual choir music festival
- "Grande Finale: Seishun Days", 2009 concert tour by Breakerz (Japanese: ブレイカーズ, romanized: Bureikazu)

=== Albums ===
- Final Fantasy VI: Grand Finale, 1994 album of videogame music
- Grande Finale, 1986 album by Björn Afzelius
- Grande Finale, 2007 album by Magnifico (musician)
- Grande Finale, 2014 album by Pippo Pollina

=== Songs ===
- "Grand Finale" (song), a 1998 song and video single by DMX, Method Man, Nas, and Ja Rule; off the soundtrack album Belly from the film Belly
- "Grande Finale", a song by Alice Cooper from his 1972 album School's Out (album)
- "Grand Finale", the seventh and final section of the 1976 Rush song "2112"
- "The Grand Finale", a song by Styx from their 1977 album The Grand Illusion
- "The Grand Finalé", a song by The D.O.C. from their 1989 album No One Can Do It Better
- "Edward Scissorhands: The Grande Finale", 1990 song by Danny Elfman for the film Edward Scissorhands; see Music for a Darkened Theatre: Film & Television Music Volume Two
- "GRAND FINALE", 2009 single by Breakerz (Japanese: ブレイカーズ, romanized: Bureikazu)
- "Grande Finale", 2014 single by Studio Killers

== Television ==
- The Genius: Grand Final (Korean: 더 지니어스: 그랜드 파이널, romanized: Deo Jinieoseu: Geulaendeu Paineol), 2015 season 4 of Korean game show The Genius
- 'Grand Finale', a game show round, the final segment of any episode of the U.S. TV show Vs. (game show)

=== Episodes ===
- "A Grande Finale", 2023 episode 17 of U.S. TV show The Real Housewives of Potomac season 7
- "Grande Finale", 2023 season 1 episode 8 of Swedish TV show Drag Race Sverige
- "Grande Finale", 2022 episode 8 of U.S. TV show RuPaul's Secret Celebrity Drag Race season 2
- "The Grand Finale", 2022 episode of Indian TV show DID Super Moms season 3
- "The Grand Finale", 2020 episode 8 of TV show Drag Race Holland season 1
- "A Grande Final", 2018 episode of Brazilian animated TV show Monica and Friends (TV series)
- "The Grande Finale", 2017 season 2 number 13 episode 22 of U.S. variety TV show Little Big Shots
- "Grand Finale", 2014 episode 9 of The Voice Kids (Australian TV series)
- "Grande Finale", 2011 season 5 number 12 episode 58 of sitcom webseries The Guild
- "Grand Finale", 2008 season 1 episode of Indian TV show Jo Jeeta Wohi Super Star
- "Grand Finale", 2007 season 1 episode of Malaysian TV show The Ultimate Prom Nite
- "Grand Finale" (Sa Re Ga Ma Pa Challenge 2005), 2006 episode of Indian TV show Sa Re Ga Ma Pa Challenge 2005
- "Grand Finale" (Sa Re Ga Ma Pa Ek Main Aur Ek Tu), 2006 episode of Indian TV show Sa Re Ga Ma Pa Ek Main Aur Ek Tu
- "The Grand Final", 2020 season 4 episode of the TV series Pocoyo

==== Seasonal episodes ====
- "La Grande Finale", the seasons' ending episodes of TV show Drag Race France
- "La Grande Finale", the seasons' ending episodes of Canadian TV show Le maître du jeu
- "Grand Final", the seasons' ending episodes of U.S. TV show America's Got Talent
- "Grand Finale", the seasons' ending episodes of U.S. TV show America's Ballroom Challenge
- "Grand Finale", the seasons' ending episodes of Thai TV show Academy Fantasia
- "Grand Finale", the seasons' ending episodes of TV show The Voice of Nepal
- "Grand Finale", the seasons' ending episodes of TV show Star Voice of India
- "Grand Finale", the seasons' ending episodes of TV show Australian Idol
- "Grand Finale", the seasons' ending episodes of Australian TV show Drag Race Down Under
- "Grand Finale", the seasons' ending episodes of The Masked Singer (Australian TV series)
- "The Grand Finale", the seasons' ending episodes of TV show The Voice (Australian TV series)
- "The Grand Finale", the seasons' ending episodes of Indian TV show Super Singer Junior

== Film ==
- Grand Finale (film), a 1936 British comedy film
- Charlie the Unicorn: The Grand Finale, a 2021 animated short webfilm, sequel to Charlie the Unicorn
- La Grande Finale, documentary about the 2006 FIFA World Cup; see Luca Zingaretti
- Downton Abbey: The Grand Finale, the final film in the Downton trilogy (2025)

== Other uses ==
- Grande Finale, an artbook by Ashley Wood
- Grande Finale, a cosmetic from Fabergé (cosmetics)

== See also ==
- IgNight – Grand Finale, a daily closing show at Six Flags Great America, an amusement park in Gurnee, Illinois, USA
- Grand final replay, in sport, when a grand final ends in a draw, a replay may be held
- Grand (disambiguation)
- Grande (disambiguation)
- Final (disambiguation)
- Finale (disambiguation)
