= Dave Barsley =

Australian rugby league footballer (1939–2021)

Personal information
- Full name: David John Barsley
- Born: 3 October 1939 Burwood, New South Wales, Australia
- Died: 31 May 2021 (aged 81)

Playing information
- Position: Wing
Club
Years	Team	Pld	T	G	FG	P
1959–68	Western Suburbs	130	41	132	0	387
1969–71	Newtown	47	10	67	3	170
	Total	177	51	199	3	557
Representative
Years	Team	Pld	T	G	FG	P
1964	NSW Country	1	0	2	0	4

Dave Barsley (3 October 1939 – 31 May 2021) was an Australian rugby league footballer who played in the 1950s, 1960s and 1970s. He played for Western Suburbs and Newtown as a winger.

== Early life ==
Barsley was born in Burwood but grew up out in Enfield located in Sydney's western suburbs. Barsley attended Enfield Primary School and Fort Street High School. At the age of 14 he began playing rugby league with South Strathfield. In the late 1950s, Barsley played A Grade with Concord United before catching the attention of Western Suburbs who signed him.

== Playing career ==
Barsley made his first grade debut for Western Suburbs in 1959 against Newtown but broke his collarbone in the same match. In 1961, Barsley was part of the Western Suburbs side which won the minor premiership and made the grand final against the all conquering St George side. St George went on to win the grand final 22-0. In 1962, Barsley played on the wing in the 1962 grand final against St George. This time the match was a much closer affair but the Saints held on to win 9-6. In 1963, Wests qualified for their third straight grand final and again the opponent was St George. Barsley was not selected for the match because he could not get time off work and John Mowbray took his place in the side. Wests went on to lose 8-3 and this would be the last time the club would make a grand final before exiting the competition in 1999.

Barsley played with Western Suburbs for the following 4 seasons but left at the end of 1968 due to a dispute over pay with the club's management. In 1969, Barsley joined Newtown on a 3-year deal worth $4,500. Barsley spent 3 years at Newtown as the club struggled towards the bottom of the ladder. After leaving Newtown, Barsley joined the Ryde-Eastwood Hawks in the Ron Massey Cup competition. Barsley spent 3 years with Ryde-Eastwood and won the premiership with them in 1972. In the same year, Barsley was voted the season's best player. Barsley retired at the end of 1974.
