= The Ultimate Prom Nite =

- Genre: Reality
- Country of origin: Malaysia
- Original language: English
- No. of seasons: 2

Original release
- Network: 8TV

The Ultimate Prom Nite is a Malaysian reality television series produced and broadcast by 8TV in collaboration with cosmetics brand Nivea. As the "inter-college prom event", it aims to seek for the "Ultimate Prom King and Queen" among male and female students, respectively, of various higher learning institutions throughout the country.

The first season aired on 1 December 2007 on 8TV as a one-off broadcast which aired the Grand Finale live from SEGi College, Kota Damansara at 11 pm. The second season airs in late 2008 in a series.

== Format ==
The Ultimate Prom Nite kicks off its search by holding a road show in various colleges and universities around the country, focusing on the search for male and female students to be finalists in the running for the "Ultimate Prom King" and "Ultimate Prom Queen" title, respectively. Hopefuls sign up at the road show and they will be featured on 8TV's website for their peers to vote for them before being selected by representatives of the organisers. After that, the selected finalists will undergo a crash course in a "grooming school" before competing in the Grand Finale.

In the Grand Finale, which is the only part of the competition being televised, each contestant is given a question different from each other, in the fashion of competitive pageant shows like Miss World and Miss Universe, as a test of their wisdom in responding to the context of their questions. Contestants stand to win a grand prize attached to the aforementioned coveted titles, leaving their fate to a panel of judges and popular vote.

== Season 1 ==
For the début season of the Ultimate Prom Nite, auditions were held in 18 colleges and universities — three in Penang, two in Johor, one in Malacca, and the rest in the Klang Valley — throughout September and October 2007. Ten finalists — five male and five female — would be selected to be in the running for the Ultimate Prom King and Queen titles, respectively, which they will compete for in SEGi College's Kota Damansara campus. These results will be determined by online voting (25%), SMS voting (25%) and judicial voting (50%).

The following are the ten contestants have been announced and put up for SMS and online voting:

Girls

- Amanda Eng Wei Ru, 19, HELP University College, Kuala Lumpur
- Karen Siah, 21, Metropolitan College, Kuala Lumpur
- Cynthia Maryline Arthur, 18, University College Sedaya International, Kuala Lumpur
- Tan Mun Yee, 18, SEGi College, Kuala Lumpur
- Intan Maisarah Abdul Rahim, 19, Sunway University College, Kuala Lumpur

Boys

- Jordan Lee Wei Hong, 19, Metropolitan College, Kuala Lumpur
- Reagan Kang Ti Kern, 18, Disted Stamford College, Penang
- Chay Ming Winstanley, 21, Kolej Damansara Utama, Kuala Lumpur
- Sean Phuah Wei Han, 20, Metropolitan College, Kuala Lumpur
- Muhammad Atiq Idris, 20, International Islamic College, Kuala Lumpur

Each contestant picked a card from a transparent bowl which contains the question he/she needed to answer. Before doing so, an introductory video clip of himself/herself is being played; in some clips, the contestants expressed their thought of exploring the broadcasting industry and television hosting business through this competition.

Voting lines were closed at 11:43 pm, and, while the results were being tabulated, a video clip showing whom each contestant thought would win the competition was played, followed by a musical performance by Bittersweet. Then, the top 10 present themselves in couples, gracefully before the results would be announced.

At 11:55 pm, Reagan Kang was announced Malaysia's Ultimate Prom King, while, about a minute later, the title of Ultimate Prom Queen landed on Amanda Eng. The prizes for the Ultimate Prom King and Queen included Celebrity Fitness membership, return trip tickets to Gold Coast, Australia by Air Asia X, an appearance together in the 8TV Quickie, Swatch merchandise, and RM10,000 cash each.

== Season 2 ==
The second instalment of the Ultimate Prom Nite comes in a series format (every Thursday, 6 November - 11 December 2008), hosted by Hansen Lee and Sarah Lian and assisted by Marion Caunter and Henry Golding as judges, which began with a series of auditions at four campuses in the Klang Valley and eight in Penang, Negeri Sembilan and Johor, in addition to a special open audition session at 8TV, Sri Pentas, Bandar Utama.

Two candidates from each college and two selected from the final road show at 8TV, Sri Pentas made up the Top 26 candidates (13 males and 13 females) who advanced into the final audition. The rundown of the competition as telecast was as follows:

- Top 25: Grooming Session with Nivea; Acting and self-improvement classes with Sazzy Falak and Nazril Idris
- Top 12: Mall Hunt at 1 Utama
- Top 10: Hari Raya Charity at Rumah Kasih Harmoni orphanage, Sungai Buloh; and Cineleisure Damansara
- Top 8: Dating with the Hosts at Sunway Lagoon
- Top 6: The Ultimate Prom Nite at SEGi Kota Damansara

The Prom Nite finale which was held in SEGi Kota Damansara was not aired live; rather, it was recorded on 28 November only to be aired 13 days later. Adam Jayarathim and Nicolette Ng were announced the recipients of the titles of Prom King and Prom Queen, each winning RM10,000 and a 15-minute spot on the 8TV Quickie.
