= Bruce Pollard =

Australian rugby league footballer

Personal information
- Full name: Bruce Pollard
- Born: 9 January 1945 (age 81) Sydney, New South Wales, Australia

Playing information
- Position: Five-eighth
Club
| Years | Team | Pld | T | G | FG | P |
|---|---|---|---|---|---|---|
| 1963–67 | St George Dragons | 67 | 24 | 0 | 0 | 72 |

Bruce Pollard (born 1945) is an Australian former rugby league footballer who played in the 1960s, and a dual premiership winner with St. George.

== Career ==
Pollard played his junior football for Renown United JRLFC. He went on to play five first grade seasons with St. George between 1963 and 1967.

He joined the first grade side after Brian Clay had broken his arm in 1963, and played in the 1963 Grand Final as an 18 year old.

Pollard went on to become a dual premiership player, winning the Grand Finals of 1963 and 1966. In 1966, he played as a centre, replacing the injured Reg Gasnier.

Pollard retired after the 1967 preliminary final when St. George were beaten 12–11 by Canterbury-Bankstown. This game finished the Dragons 11 straight premiership winning sequence by eliminating them from the 1967 Grand Final.
