= The Gladiators (photograph) =

1963 photograph of Norm Provan and Arthur Summons

The Gladiators is a 1963 photograph of rugby league players Norm Provan and Arthur Summons by newspaper photographer John O'Gready. The image is the basis for the National Rugby League's Provan-Summons trophy, awarded to the winner of the NRL Grand Final. Prior to that, from 1982 to 1995 it was used as the model for the NSWRL Winfield Cup competition trophy.

The 1963 NSWRFL season between long term rivals Western Suburbs and St George was played in a torrential downpour on Saturday, 24 August. This, combined with the fact that the Sydney Cricket Ground was notoriously muddy in such conditions, resulted in the players being caked in mud from head to toe. At the conclusion of the hard-fought match, which was won by St George, the captains of the two teams, St George's tall Norm Provan and Wests' more diminutive Summons embraced in "what seemed a friendly embrace".

The moment was captured by the newspaper photographer O'Gready, and published in the following day's The Sun-Herald, although on page three rather than the front page, and under the caption 'Who's That?' Subsequently, the photograph won several awards, becoming known as The Gladiators. It became associated with rugby league in Australia and as a message of "triumph, courage and sportsmanship" and a depiction of the values of mateship.

Years later, Summons revealed that the moment of the photograph actually depicted a moment of bitterness; unlike other players, he was refusing to swap his jumper with Provan, because he believed the result of the game was unfair as he had heard a rumour that match's referee, Darcy Lawler, had bet on St George to win. According to Summons years later, he was saying to Provan words to the effect of "You were lucky to get away with that". Provan later recalled that he believed at the time his side had won fairly, and he was unaware that Summons was upset. At the time of the photograph, Provan and Summons barely knew each other; however over the years as it became more famous, the two became close friends.

In 2008 the Western Suburbs Magpies celebrated their centenary by inducting six inaugural members into the club's Hall of Fame. These six included Summons.

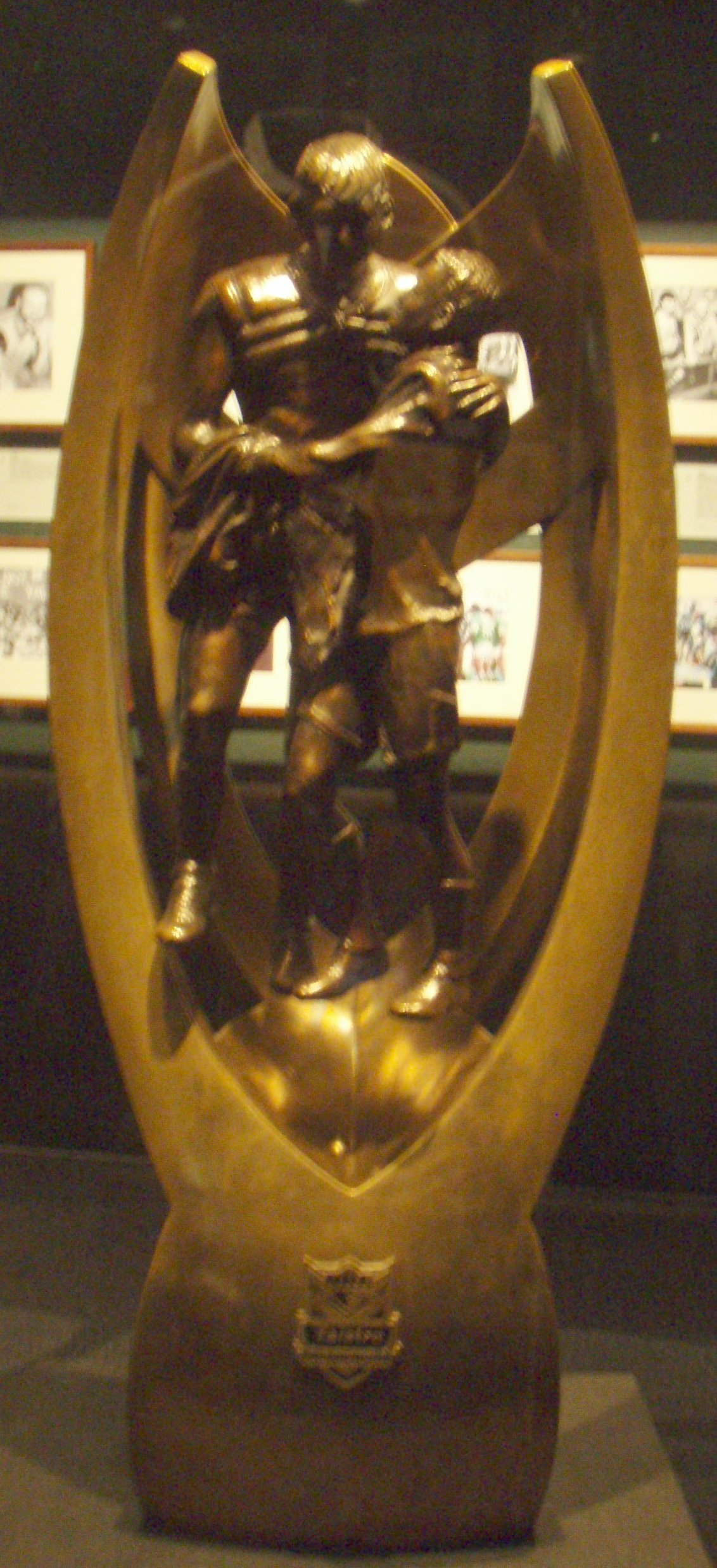
The Provan-Summons Trophy

The Provan-Summons Trophy is the NRL's main prize, awarded to the team that wins the premiership. Its sculptured design is similar to the Winfield Cup trophy, which, despite its name, was introduced for the 1982 NSWRFL season. It is a three-dimensional cast of a famous photo called The Gladiators, which depicts a mud-soaked Norm Provan of St. George and Arthur Summons of Western Suburbs embracing after the 1963 NSWRFL season's Grand Final. It was not officially named the Provan-Summons Trophy until 2013, the 50th anniversary of the 1963 Grand Final. The trophy is awarded following each grand final to the captain of the winning club.

Each player from the premiership winning side are also awarded Premiership Rings.

== See also ==
- Sports photography
