= John Mowbray (rugby league) =

Australian rugby league footballer (born 1940)

Personal information
- Full name: John Robert Mowbray
- Born: 13 December 1940 Springwood, New South Wales, Australia
- Died: 20 November 2009 (aged 68)

Playing information
- Position: Wing
Club
Years	Team	Pld	T	G	FG	P
1959–68	Western Suburbs	85	40	0	0	120

John Mowbray (1940-2009) was an Australian former professional rugby league footballer who played in the 1950s and 1960s. He played for Western Suburbs in the NSWRL competition, as a wing.

== Early life ==
Mowbray was born in Springwood and played his junior rugby league with the Guildford Owls in the Parramatta district. Mowbray initially trialed with Balmain but was unsuccessful in being signed in their squad. Mowbray then went and trialed with Western Suburbs and was successful in obtaining a contract after starring in a pre-season match against Parramatta at Cumberland Oval.

== Playing career ==
Mowbray made his first grade debut for Wests against Manly at Pratten Park in 1959. Mowbray did not feature for Western Suburbs in either the 1961 or 1962 grand final defeats to St George but was a member of the 1963 grand final side which lost to St George 8–3. The grand final is widely remembered for the muddy conditions during the match and the photograph of Norm Provan and Arthur Summons which was taken at full time. This would be the last grand final that Western Suburbs would play in as a stand-alone entity until they exited the competition in 1999. Mowbray played a further five seasons for Wests and retired at the end of 1968.
