= Wagga Wagga Leagues Club =

Former place in New South Wales, Australia

Coordinates: 35°6′39.80″S 147°21′6.80″E

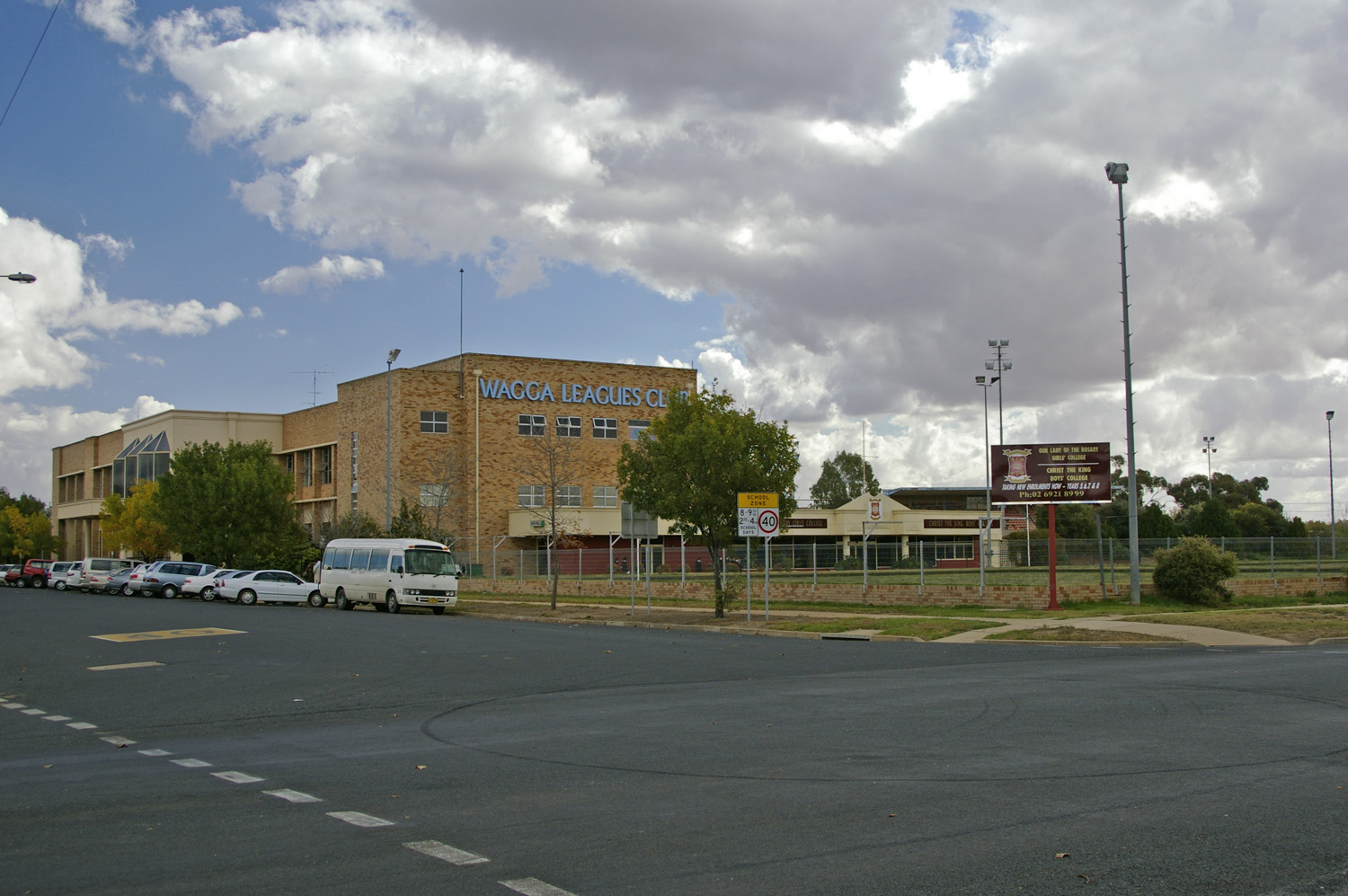
Former Wagga Wagga Leagues Club building

Wagga Wagga Leagues Club was a facility founded in 1955 by the Wagga Magpies Football Club in Wagga Wagga, New South Wales, Australia.

== History ==
In 1955, Magpies Football Club purchased an 8.5-acre (3.4 ha) block in Gurwood Street from the Wagga Wagga War Services Home Commission, who constructed a temporary clubhouse. A new Rugby Leagues Club, Eric Weissel Oval and Tennis courts was constructed in 1959 with a second storey constructed on the club building in 1964.

=== Financial difficulty ===
2003 Wagga Wagga Leagues Club president, Brian Lawrence announced that the club was in $4 million in debt. March 2003 Queensland Clubs Management and Melbourne Storm owner John Ribot offered a $4 million package to clear the club's debts however the founding president of the Wagga Wagga Leagues club, Jack Murphy was concerned that the club's debts was from poor management. 20 March 2003 disgruntled leagues club members requested an explanation from the leagues club's board of directors about the $4 million rescue package offered by John Ribot.

1 April 2003 extraordinary meeting by disgruntled members which was to call on the removal of four leagues directors was postponed after the Leagues Club signing the deal from John Ribot. New South Wales Gaming Minister Grant McBride was concerned about the rescue deal by Queensland Clubs Management who ordered a review of commercial arrangements of the deal. 1 August 2003, Leagues Club president dismissed the Prime News report that the club's board members voted for the club to be placed under voluntary administration and also denied that Queensland Clubs Management walked away from the deal, however the club was placed under an administrator (Deloitte Touche Tohmatsu) after the "belief the club is insolvent, or likely to become insolvent".

=== Closure ===
28 June 2004 Leagues club Board member Gary Barton announced that Queensland Club Management would withdraw its rescue deal and would meet with creditors to look at options for the club's future. On 28 June 2004 the club announced that its doors would close for the final time after the Queensland Clubs Management withdrew its financial support. 5 July 2004 creditors voted to place the Leagues Club under liquidation after the club lost its financial support.

=== Sale ===
In 2005, the Wagga Magpies merged with Turvey Park Lions to form the South City Bulls.

In April 2005, the Leagues Club building, Eric Weissel Oval and Allen Staunton Oval was sold for $1.3 million to a private consortium.

=== Christian college ===
In November 2006 New South Wales Board of Studies granted a 12-month provisional registration for a Christian school to set up in the former Leagues Club building.

== See also ==
- List of pubs in Australia
- List of restaurant in Australia
