= Boston University Metropolitan College =

College in Boston, Massachusetts, US

- Type: Private
- Established: 1965
- Dean: Tanya Zlateva, PhD
- Location: Boston, Massachusetts, United States
- Campus: Urban
- Website: bu.edu/met

Boston University Metropolitan College (MET) is one of the 17 degree-granting schools and colleges of Boston University.

Founded in 1965, Metropolitan College offers more than 80 undergraduate and graduate degree and certificate programs. Professional in nature, these programs focus on established and emerging areas of industry with an emphasis on practical, hands-on learning. Programs are offered both part-time and full-time, with courses available evenings on the Charles River Campus. Additionally, close to 70 degrees and certificates are available fully online.

== Faculty ==
Metropolitan College has full-time, adjunct, and part-time faculties, while also sharing faculty members with other Boston University schools and colleges. Of the full-time faculty, 94% hold doctoral degrees.

== Academic Degree and Certificate Programs ==
=== Master of Arts Degree ===
- Gastronomy

=== Master of Science Degrees ===
- Actuarial Science
- Administrative Studies—Innovation & Technology
- Advertising
- Applied Business Analytics
- Applied Data Analytics
- Arts Administration
- City Planning
- Computer Information Systems
- Computer Science
- Criminal Justice
- Enterprise Risk Management
- Financial Management
- Global Marketing Management
- Health Communication
- Health Informatics
- Insurance Management
- Project Management
- Software Development
- Supply Chain Management
- Urban Affairs

=== Graduate Certificates ===
- Actuarial Foundations
- Actuarial Science
- Advanced Information Technology
- Applied Business Analytics
- Applied Sustainability
- Applied Urban Informatics
- Arts Management
- Arts Marketing
- Commercial Theater Development
- Computer Networks
- Corporate Finance
- Crime Analysis
- Criminal Justice
- Cybercrime Investigation & Cybersecurity
- Data Analytics
- Database Management & Business Intelligence
- Digital Forensics
- Enterprise Risk Management
- Financial Management
- Food Studies
- Foundations of Health Communication
- Fundraising Management
- Global Marketing Management
- Health Informatics
- Healthcare Promotion, Media & Marketing
- Information Security
- Information Technology
- Innovation & Entrepreneurship
- International Business Management
- International Finance
- Investment Analysis
- IT Project Management
- Linguistics
- Medical Information Security & Privacy
- Project Management
- Project, Program & Portfolio Management
- Software Engineering
- Strategic Management in Criminal Justice
- Supply Chain Management
- Urban Policy & Planning
- Visual & Digital Health Communication
- Web Application Development

=== Bachelor of Liberal Studies Degrees ===
- Art History
- English & American Literature
- History
- Interdisciplinary Studies
- Philosophy
- Undergraduate Degree Completion Program (online)

=== Bachelor of Science Degrees ===
- Biology
- Computer Science
- Criminal Justice
- Economics
- Interdisciplinary Studies
- Management Studies
- Mathematics
- Psychology
- Sociology
- Urban Affairs

=== Undergraduate Certificates ===
- Business Management
- Computer Science
- Criminal Justice
- International Business Management
- Pre-Medical Studies (Post-Baccalaureate)

== Non-Credit and Lifelong Learning Programs ==
- Center for Professional Education
- Evergreen
- Programs in Food & Wine

== U.S. News Rankings ==
U.S. News & World Report Rankings 2024:

- #3, Best Online Master's in Criminal Justice Programs
- #8, Best Online Master's in Information Technology Programs
- #6, Best Online Master's in Business Programs (excluding MBA)

== Professional Accreditation ==
Metropolitan College programs are accredited by the following organizations:

- Project Management Institute Global Accreditation Center for Project Management Education Programs (GAC) (Master of Science programs in Computer Information Systems (IT Project Management concentration) and Project Management)
- Commission on Accreditation for Health Informatics and Information Management Education (CAHIIM) (Master of Science programs in Computer Information Systems (Health Informatics concentration) and Health Informatics)
- New England Commission of Higher Education (NECHE) as part of Boston University
- AACSB International―The Association to Advance Collegiate Schools of Business, as part of Boston University Questrom School of Business

== Awards ==
United States Distance Learning Association (USDLA)

- 21st Century Award for Best Practices in Distance Learning (2016)

Blackboard

- Blackboard Catalyst Exemplary Course Award—Directors Choice for Courses with Distinction (2014)
- Blackboard Catalyst Exemplary Course Award (2012)

Telly

- Video Bronze Award (2012)
