= Arthur Summons =

Australian rugby league footballer (1935–2020)

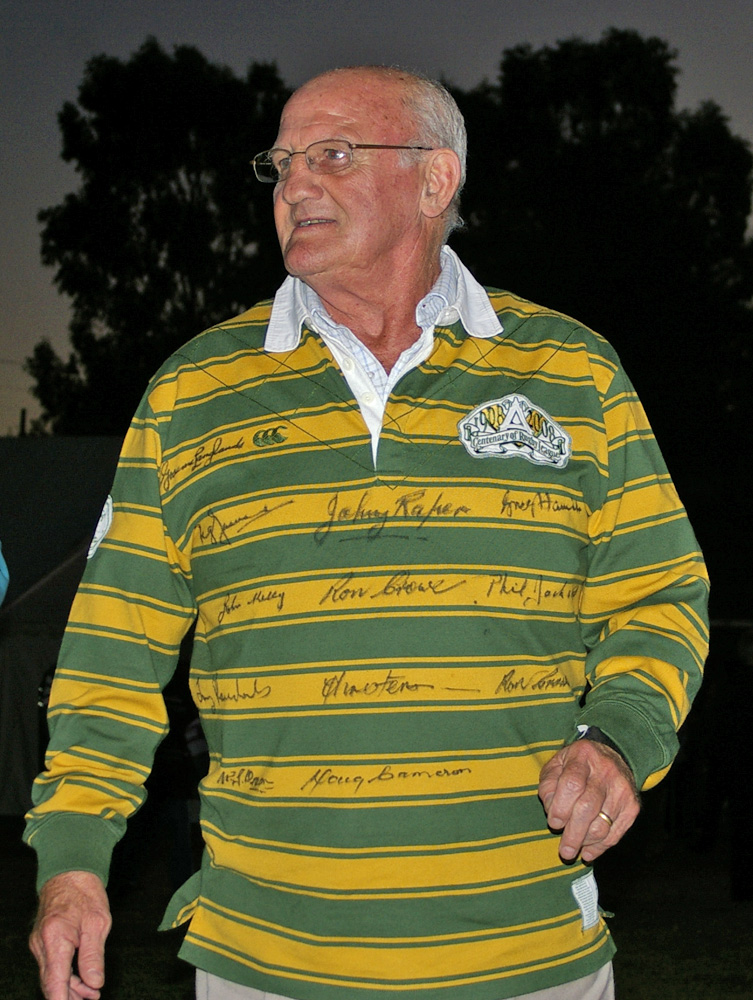
- Summons in 2008
- Born: Arthur James Summons; 13 December 1935 Paddington, New South Wales
- Died: 16 May 2020 (aged 84) Wagga Wagga, New South Wales, Australia
- School: Homebush Boys High School
- Occupation(s): Teacher, Club Manager

Rugby union career
- Position: Fly half
Amateur team(s)
Years	Team	Apps	(Points)
1954–59	Gordon RFC		
- Correct as of 31 December 2007
International career
Years	Team	Apps	(Points)
1956–1959	Australia	10	
- Correct as of 31 December 2007
- Rugby league career

Playing information
- Position: Half-back
Club
Years	Team	Pld	T	G	FG	P
1960–64	Wests Magpies	60				33
1965–67	Wagga Magpies
	Total	60	0	0	0	33
Representative
Years	Team	Pld	T	G	FG	P
1961–63	New South Wales	7				0
1961–64	Australia	9				12

Coaching information
Representative
Years	Team	Gms	W	D	L	W%
1963–64	Australia	6	4	0	2	67
1970	Australia	3	1	0	2	33

Arthur James Summons (13 December 1935 – 16 May 2020) was an Australian representative rugby union and rugby league player, a dual-code rugby international fly-half or five-eighth. He captained the Australian national rugby league team in five undefeated test matches from 1962 until 1964 and later also coached the side.

== Early life ==
Summons was born in Paddington, Sydney, New South Wales, Australia and educated at the publicly funded selective Homebush Boys High School where he captained the school's first grade rugby union side. He represented for Combined High Schools and later captained a Sydney Combined Teachers' College side. He had also played junior rugby league with the Mount Pritchard club.

== Rugby union career ==
He was graded with the Gordon Rugby Union Club and first represented the Wallabies in tour matches against the Springboks in 1956. He toured the British Isles on 1957–58 Australia rugby union tour of Britain, Ireland and France, making his full debut in the first test match of the tour, against Wales at Cardiff. He played in four tests of the tour; only missing the test match against France. During the 1958 season, he made four test appearances against, firstly, the New Zealand Māori rugby union team and then three times against the All Blacks on the Wallabies' tour of New Zealand. He made two further test appearances, against the visiting British Lions in Sydney in 1959, concluding his rugby union career with a total of ten Wallaby test caps.

== Rugby league career ==
With a young family and needing to improve his financial position, Summons signed with Western Suburbs in 1960. He played in the 3 consecutive Wests grand final losses to St George between 1961 and 1963.

He first represented Australia in rugby league in 1961, touring New Zealand and appearing in six matches on tour, including two test matches. His international rugby league debut in the first test against New Zealand, in Auckland on 1 July 1961, saw Summons become Australia's 26th dual code rugby international, following Rex Mossop and preceding Michael Cleary.

In 1962, he played in two test match losses against Great Britain before he was appointed captain for the third test with Reg Gasnier and Keith Barnes ruled out. Australia won the game 18–17 following a late Ken Irvine sideline conversion of his own try.

In 1963, Summons led Australia to wins against New Zealand, South Africa and on the Kangaroo tour of Britain, for which he was appointed captain-coach. He missed all three tour tests against the Lions but masterminded the Ashes victory, establishing a plan to dominate the British through the forwards. This was the first series victory on British soil for Australia. He captained Australia to victory in two tests on the French leg of the tour but did not represent Australia again.

He finished his club career in Australia, playing five seasons with the Wagga Magpies and working as Secretary-Manager of the Wagga Wagga Leagues Club. He was made a Life member of the Sydney Cricket Ground.

In February 2008, Summons was named in the list of Australia's 100 greatest players between 1908 and 2007, which was commissioned by the NRL and ARL to celebrate the code's centenary year in Australia.

In 2008, the Western Suburbs Magpies celebrated their centenary by inducting six inaugural members into the club's Hall of Fame. These six included Summons.

== The Gladiators ==
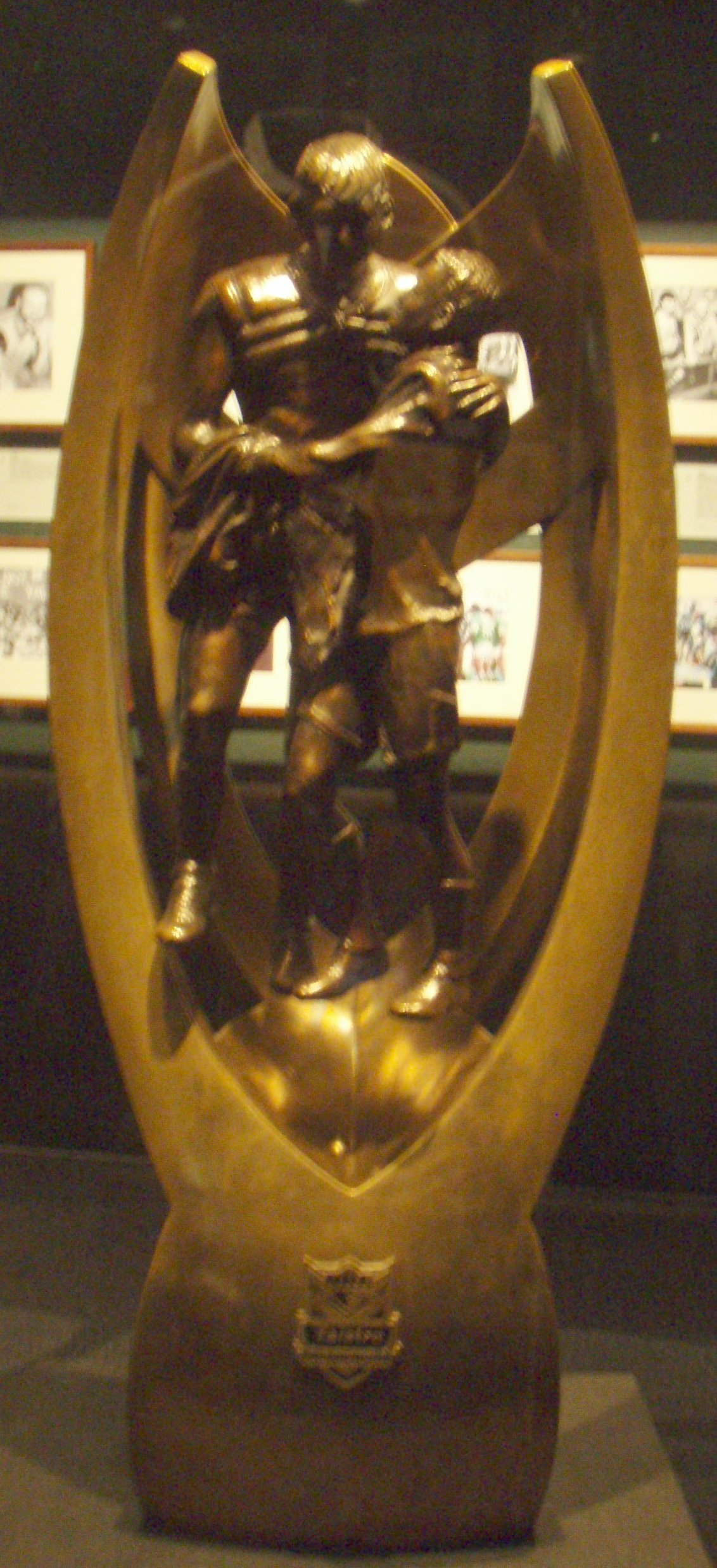
Summons depicted right on the NRL Trophy

Summons is the subject of one of the most memorable sporting photographic images ever captured in Australia. The 1963 NSW Rugby League Premiership grand final between long-term rivals Western Suburbs and St George was played in a torrential downpour on Saturday, 24 August. This, combined with the fact that the centre cricket pitch area of Sydney Cricket Ground was notoriously muddy in such conditions, ensured that the players were not only saturated but also caked in mud from head to toe. At the conclusion of the hard-fought match, which was won by St George, the captains of the two teams, the very tall Norm Provan and more diminutive Summons, embraced in appreciation of each other's stoic efforts. The moment was captured by a newspaper photographer, John O'Gready, and published in the following day's The Sun-Herald. Subsequently, the image won several awards, becoming known as The Gladiators. Summons later said that The Gladiators is actually Summons complaining about the referee's decision to Provan. This image was the inspiration for the current premiership trophy's bronze statue.

== Later life and death ==
In 1964 Summons retired to Wagga Wagga and was secretary-manager of the Wagga Wagga Leagues Club. He died aged 84 on 16 May 2020.

== Sources ==
- Whiticker, Alan & Hudson, Glen (2006) The Encyclopedia of Rugby League Players, Gavin Allen Publishing, Sydney
- Whiticker, Alan(2004) Captaining the Kangaroos, New Holland, Sydney

Preceded by Reg Gasnier	Australian national rugby league captain 1962–64	Succeeded by Billy Wilson
