= Norm Provan =

Australian rugby league footballer and coach (1932–2021)

Personal information
- Full name: Norman Douglas Somerville Provan
- Born: 18 December 1932 Urana, New South Wales, Australia
- Died: 13 October 2021 (aged 88) Sunshine Coast, Queensland, Australia

Playing information
- Height: 193 cm (6 ft 4 in)
- Weight: 99 kg (15 st 8 lb)
- Position: Second-row
Club
Years	Team	Pld	T	G	FG	P
1951–65	St. George	256	64	1	0	194
Representative
Years	Team	Pld	T	G	FG	P
1954–61	New South Wales	19	4	0	0	12
1954–60	Australia	14	7	0	0	21

Coaching information
Club
Years	Team	Gms	W	D	L	W%
1962–65	St. George	81	66	2	13	81
1968	St. George	24	14	3	7	58
1975	Parramatta	27	14	1	12	52
1978–79	Cronulla-Sutherland	50	31	2	17	62
	Total	182	125	8	49	69
Representative
Years	Team	Gms	W	D	L	W%
1974	Illawarra Firsts	2	0	0	2	0
- Relatives: Peter Provan (brother)

Norman Douglas Somerville Provan (18 December 1932 – 13 October 2021) was an Australian professional rugby league footballer and coach. Also nicknamed "Sticks", he was a second-row forward with the St. George Dragons during the first ten of their eleven consecutive premiership-winning years (1956-1966). Named among the nation's finest footballers of the 20th century, he was a representative in the Australia national team from 1954 to 1960, winning 14 Tests and a World Cups. In 2018, he was inducted as the 13th Immortal of Australian rugby league.

== Club career and player-coach ==
Provan's first junior football was played for Willoughby Roos in the North Sydney District and attending high school at Crows Nest. After his family relocated to the St George-Sutherland region, he played with the Sutherland Woronora Juniors and the Sutherland Gravediggers. He was graded by St George in 1950 after being turned down by Easts the prior year. Having won the premiership in 1949, St George slipped to a fifth-place finish in 1950 but things were falling into place that year with the move to Jubilee Oval, Frank Facer's move from player to club selector and committeeman and Provan's arrival.

Provan featured in their 1951 campaign – a loss in the final against Manly for 3rd place; a 2nd place in the minor premiership in 1952 and a semi-final exit to North Sydney; and then the 1953 Dragons side that lost the 1953 final to South Sydney. St George and Souths would battle head-to-head on many more occasions in Provan's career.

Provan's strength at second row in attack and in defence, in partnership with Harry Melville, Harry Bath and Monty Porter laid the foundations in those first years of their glory run. After the retirement of Ken Kearney in 1962 from the playing arena, and given the Dragons administrators' preference for a player-coach, Provan took over as captain-coach and the club's dominant run continued.

A fitness fanatic himself, Provan continued Kearney's punishing and successful training routine giving Dragon sides of the period confidence that they could edge out their fatiguing opposition in the final twenty minutes of each encounter. Provan set high standards for himself and his players directing a training mix that included sandhill running at Cronulla; lap running at Kogarah and touch football. He was content to maintain a certain distance from the team and saw the captain-coach role as a tough, solitary role requiring him to stand slightly apart from his players. A teetotaler later in life, Provan occasionally shared a drink in the shed after a match but he would rarely finish the first beer.

I was never one of the boys, I never went to the pub or places like that. But this aloofness did give me a bit of an edge – and I never had to make any apologies for any of the decisions I made or feel bad about dropping a close mate.

— Apter, p35

Provan holds the club record of 284 games for St George achieved between 1951 and 1965. He played in the first ten of their record run of 11 premiership victories – as captain-coach for four – and made 30 finals appearances for the club over fifteen consecutive seasons. His last game before retirement was a victory in the 1965 Grand Final where the Dragons beat the Rabbitohs 12–8 in front of 78,065 which stands as the Sydney Cricket Ground's all-time attendance record.

== Representative career ==
In 1954, Provan first represented for New South Wales and that same year made his Test debut, playing in all three matches of the 1954 series against the visiting Great Britain side commencing a representative second-row partnership with Wests Kel O'Shea that would continue for a number of years.

Provan was selected for the 1956 Kangaroo tour. Due to injury, he missed the Ashes series against Great Britain but appeared in three Tests against France at the end of the tour. He appeared in 15 other minor matches on the tour. In 1957, he was a member of Australia's victorious World Cup squad.

He continued his Test pairing with Kel O'Shea in all three games of the domestic 1958 series against Great Britain and in 1959 featured in all three Tests against the visiting Kiwis. Also in 1959 Provan played in the New South Wales loss to Queensland that attracted 35,261 spectators, smashing Brisbane's previous record for an interstate match of 22,817.

Family priorities and business commitments caused him to cut short his representative career starting with the 1959 Kangaroo tour and he made his final national appearance in the 1960 series against France.

Provan is listed on the Australian Players Register as Kangaroo No. 310.

== Non-playing coach ==
After retiring from playing he went on to coach. He was a non-playing coach for St George for a season in 1968 and with Parramatta for a single season in 1975. Under his stewardship the club won the Pre-Season Cup (Wills Cup), the club's maiden first-grade title, and fell one game short of making their first Grand Final appearance.

He had two seasons coaching Cronulla-Sutherland in 1978 and 1979 taking them to a grand final in 1978 which they lost to Manly.

== Records ==
He played in finals football for fifteen consecutive seasons from 1951 to 1965. Along with Brian Clay, his appearance in ten Grand Finals is an Australian rugby league record. His victory statistic of ten consecutive first-grade premierships is a world record in rugby league and a world class achievement in any top-grade team sport. In the 1962 Grand Final at the age of 29 years and 271 days, he became the youngest person to ever coach a side to premiership victory in a Grand Final, a record that still stands.

His brother Peter Provan played alongside him at St George in the 1958 and 1959 Grand Finals and later captained the Balmain Tigers to their 1969 Grand Final victory. Together Norm and Peter are the only brothers to have led different Australian first-grade rugby league sides to premiership victories.

== Accolades ==
Provan was awarded Life Membership of the St George Dragons club in 1963.

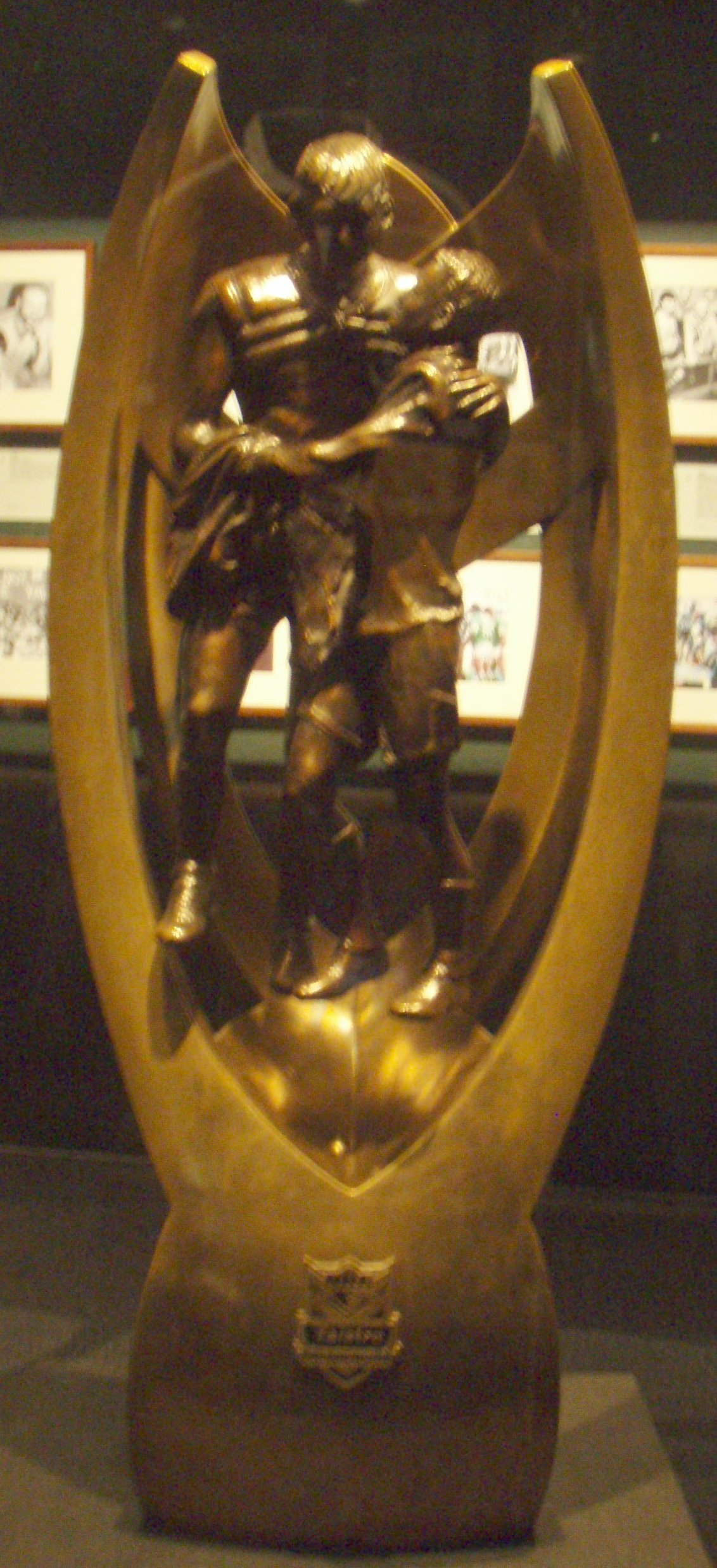
Proven depicted left on the NRL Trophy

The Gladiators – Provan is the subject of one of the most memorable sporting photographic images ever captured in Australia. The 1963 NSW Rugby League Premiership grand final between long term rivals Western Suburbs and St George was played in a torrential downpour on Saturday, 24 August. This, combined with the fact that the centre cricket pitch area of Sydney Cricket Ground was notoriously muddy in such conditions, ensured that the players were not only saturated but also caked in mud from head to toe. At the conclusion of the hard-fought match, which was won by St George, the captains of the two teams, the very tall Norm Provan and more diminutive Arthur Summons, embraced in appreciation of each other's stoic efforts. The moment was captured by a newspaper photographer, John O'Gready, and published in the following day's Sun Herald. Subsequently, the image won several awards, becoming known as The Gladiators. This image was the inspiration for the current premiership trophy's bronze statue.

In 2004 Provan was admitted into the Australian Rugby League Hall of Fame. In 2007 he was selected by a panel of experts at second-row in an Australian 'Team of the 50s'.

In February 2008, Provan was named in the list of Australia's 100 Greatest Players (1908–2007) which was commissioned by the NRL and ARL to celebrate the code's centenary year in Australia. Provan went on to be named in the second-row in Australian rugby league's Team of the Century. Announced on 17 April 2008, the team is the panel's majority choice for each of the thirteen starting positions and four interchange players. In 2008 New South Wales announced their rugby league team of the century also and Provan was again named at second-row.

In October 2015, Provan was inducted into the Sport Australia Hall of Fame.

In 2018 Provan was inducted as a Rugby League Immortal along with Mal Meninga and pre-WWII greats Dave Brown, Frank Burge and Dally Messenger. On 20 July 2022, Provan was named in the St. George Dragons District Rugby League Clubs team of the century.

== Reflections ==
Provan wrote the introduction to the Haddan book The Finals – 100 Years and reflected upon the dressing room mood before the momentous 1965 Grand Final:

It's 1965, St George and Souths in the grand final at the Sydney Cricket Ground. It's five minutes before we walk out. The boys are sitting around, very quiet now, just thinking about their own games. I have finished my last 10-minute talk to the team, just a summary of our general plan – no shouting or yelling or 'geeing' up. These players just don't need that. I have this terrible sick feeling in my gut. We have to lose a grand final sooner or later. The law of averages demands it. This one would make it 10. A nice round figure and I can retire happy. The linesman comes to the door, looks at me and nods. I nod back. We all stand up. The sick feeling is gone. 'Let's give it another go!'.

— Haddan, Introduction px
