= 1959–60 Kangaroo tour =

Rugby league tour (1959–1960)

- Manager: Jack Argent; Ern Keffer
- Coach(es): Clive Churchill
- Tour captain(s): Keith Barnes
- Top point scorer(s): Keith Barnes 202
- Top try scorer(s): Eddie Lumsden 25
- Top test point scorer(s): Keith Barnes 62
- Top test try scorer(s): Eddie Lumsden 8
Summary
P	W	D	L
Total
37	26	0	11
Test match
8	6	0	2
Opponent
P	W	D	L
Great Britain
3	1	0	2
France
3	3	0	0
Italy
2	2	0	0

Tour chronology
- Previous tour: 1956-57
- Next tour: 1963-64

The 1959–60 Kangaroo tour was the tenth Kangaroo tour, in which the Australian national rugby league team traveled to Europe and played thirty-seven matches against British, French and Italian teams, including the Ashes series of three Test matches against Great Britain, two Test matches against the French and an additional two non-Test matches against an Italian representative team. It followed the tour of 1956-57 and the next was staged in 1963-64.

== The squad's leadership ==
The team was coached by Clive Churchill. The team captain was Balmain Tigers Fullback Keith Barnes while the vice-captain was Manly-Warringah's dual rugby international forward Rex Mossop. Tour co-managers were Jack Argent and Ern Keffer.
In the five matches in which neither Barnes nor Mossop played, the Kangaroos were captained by five different players: Harry Wells (against Leigh), Brian Hambly (combined Workington and Whitehaven), Brian Clay (Bradford Northern), Brian Carlson (Swinton) and Billy Wilson (Huddersfield).

== Touring squad ==
The Rugby League News published a photo and details of the touring team including the players' ages and weights.
Match details - listing surnames of both teams and the point scorers - were included in E.E. Christensen's Official Rugby League Yearbook, as was a summary of the players' point-scoring.
Beattie, Boden, Kelly, Muir, Parcell, Paterson and Rasmussen were selected from Queensland clubs. Chapman, Hambly, Parish and Walsh were selected from clubs in New South Wales Country areas. The balance of the squad had played for Sydney based clubs during the 1959 season.

Player	Position	Age	Weight	Club	Tests on Tour	Games	Tries	Goals	FG	Points
Keith Barnes (c)	Fullback	24	11 st. 10 lb. (74 kg)	Balmain	8	22	0	101	0	202
Dud Beattie	Prop	23	15 st. 0 lb. (95 kg)	Ipswich Railways	4	20	0	0	0	0
Ron Boden	Wing, Centre	21	12 st. 6 lb. (79 kg)	Toowoomba Valleys	0	14	5	0	0	15
Tony Brown	Five-eighth	23	12 st. 0 lb. (76 kg)	Newtown	2	9	4	0	0	12
Bob Bugden	Halfback	23	11 st. 10 lb. (74 kg)	St George	0	5	4	0	0	12
Peter Burke	Halfback	25	11 st. 2 lb. (71 kg)	Manly-Warringah	1	13	9	0	0	27
Brian Carlson	Utility Back	26	13 st. 0 lb. (83 kg)	North Sydney	4	23	19	49	0	155
Darrel Chapman	Fullback	21	11 st. 6 lb. (73 kg)	Kempsey	1	18	3	0	0	9
Brian Clay	Five-eighth, Lock	25	13 st. 3 lb. (84 kg)	St George	6	20	4	1	0	14
Bill Delamare	Prop	23	15 st. 0 lb. (95 kg)	Manly-Warringah	2	19	5	0	0	15
Reg Gasnier	Centre	20	12 st. 5 lb. (78 kg)	St George	6	19	20	0	0	60
Brian Hambly	Prop, Second-row	22	14 st. 6 lb. (92 kg)	Wagga Magpies	8	21	9	1	0	29
Ken Irvine	Wing	19	11 st. 12 lb. (75 kg)	North Sydney	3	21	17	0	0	51
Noel Kelly	Prop, Hooker	23	13 st. 9 lb. (87 kg)	Ipswich Brothers	1	14	2	1	0	8
Eddie Lumsden	Wing	22	13 st. 2 lb. (83 kg)	St George	8	27	25	0	0	75
Rex Mossop (vc)	Prop, Second-row	30	14 st. 5 lb. (91 kg)	Manly-Warringah	5	26	2	0	0	6
Barry Muir	Halfback	21	10 st. 11 lb. (68 kg)	Brisbane Western Suburbs	7	21	1	0	0	3
Gary Parcell	Prop	26	14 st. 6 lb. (92 kg)	Ipswich Brothers	5	20	2	0	0	6
Don Parish	Wing	21	11 st. 7 lb. (73 kg)	Dubbo Macquarie	0	12	7	16	0	53
Jim Paterson	Prop, Second-row	23	14 st. 6 lb. (92 kg)	Townsville Souths	3	22	4	0	0	12
Johnny Raper	Five-eighth, Lock	20	13 st. 2 lb. (83 kg)	St George	4	17	14	0	0	42
Elton Rasmussen	Prop, Second-row	22	15 st. 5 lb. (98 kg)	Toowoomba All Whites	3	20	4	1	0	14
Johnny Riley	Centre	20	12 st. 0 lb. (76 kg)	St George	2	15	2	0	0	6
Ian Walsh	Hooker	25	13 st. 4 lb. (84 kg)	Eugowra	8	23	3	1	0	11
Harry Wells	Centre	27	14 st. 6 lb. (92 kg)	Western Suburbs	7	22	11	0	0	33
Billy Wilson	Prop	30	14 st. 1 lb. (89 kg)	St George	6	19	2	0	0	6

== Great Britain ==
The largest non-test attendance of the tour was 29,156 when the Kangaroos defeated St. Helens at Knowsley Road.

=== Test Venues ===
The three Ashes series tests took place at the following venues.

Swinton	Leeds	Wigan
Station Road	Headingley	Central Park
Capacity: 40,000	Capacity: 35,000	Capacity: 48,000

Saturday, 12 September	Leeds	20 – 44	Australia	Headingley, Leeds
		[ Report]		Attendance: 14,629

Tuesday, 15 September	Rochdale Hornets	14 – 27	Australia	Athletic Grounds, Rochdale
		[ Report]		Attendance: 10,155

Wednesday, 18 September	Warrington	24 – 30	Australia	Wilderspool, Warrington
		[ Report]		Attendance: 17,112

Wednesday, 23 September	Lancashire	30 – 22	Australia	Knowsley Road, St. Helens
		[ Report]		Attendance: 15,743

Saturday, 26 September	Salford	20 – 22	Australia	The Willows, Salford
		[ Report]		Attendance: 11,008

Monday, 28 September	Yorkshire	47 – 15	Australia	Clarence Street, York
		[ Report]		Attendance: 7,338

Thursday, 1 October	Widnes	15 – 45	Australia	Naughton Park, Widnes
		[ Report]		Attendance: 9,381

Saturday, 3 October	Oldham	14 – 25	Australia	Watersheddings, Oldham
		[ Report]		Attendance: 17,630

Wednesday, 7 October	Leigh	18 – 17	Australia	Hilton Park, Leigh
		[ Report]		Attendance: 11,932

Saturday, 10 October	St. Helens	2 – 15	Australia	Knowsley Road, St. Helens
		[ Report]		Attendance: 29,156

=== The Ashes series ===
The Ashes series against Great Britain saw an aggregate crowd of 91,604 attending the Test series. The largest attendance of the tour came during the Kangaroos 22-14 first test win over Great Britain at Station Road in Swinton with 35,224 in attendance.

==== First Test ====
The first Ashes series test was played at Station Road, Swinton and drew the tours largest attendance of 35,224. Australia won the first test 22-14 with Reg Gasnier playing in his first ever test match against Great Britain named as the man of the match with 3 tries.

Saturday, 17 October

Great Britain	14 – 22	Australia
Tries: Billy Boston; Derek Turner; Goals: Eric Fraser (4)		Tries: Reg Gasnier (3); Harry Wells; Goals: Keith Barnes (5)

Station Road, Swinton
Attendance: 35,224
Referee: R. Gelder (England)
Player of the Match: Reg Gasnier

Great Britain	Position	Australia
1. Eric Fraser	FB	1. Keith Barnes (c)
2. Billy Boston	WG	10. Johnny Riley
3. Eric Ashton (c)	CE	8. Harry Wells
4. Alan Davies	CE	7. Reg Gasnier
5. Mick Sullivan	WG	3.Eddie Lumsden
6. Dave Bolton	SO	16. Brian Clay
7. Alex Murphy	SH	12. Barry Muir
8. Abe Terry	PR	21. Billy Wilson
9. Tommy Harris	HK	26. Ian Walsh
10. Brian McTigue	PR	24. Dud Beattie
12. Mick Martyn	SR	22. Gary Parcell
11. Dick Huddart	SR	18. Rex Mossop
13. Derek Turner	LF	19. Brian Hambly
Jim Challinor	Coach	Clive Churchill

Thursday, 22 October	Whitehaven / Workington Town XIII	8 – 13	Australia	Recreation Ground, Whitehaven
		[ Report]		Attendance: 7,463

Saturday, 24 October	Barrow	12 – 9	Australia	Craven Park, Barrow
		[ Report]		Attendance: 8,488

Monday, 26 October	Hull F.C. / Hull Kingston Rovers XIII	9 – 29	Australia	The Boulevard, Hull
		[ Report]		Attendance: 15,944

Wednesday, 4 November	Bradford Northern	8 – 29	Australia	Odsal, Bradford
		[ Report]		Attendance: 4,126

5 days prior to the match against Bradford Northern, the Kangaroos played the first test against France.

Saturday, 7 November	Halifax	5 – 17	Australia	Thrum Hall, Halifax
		[ Report]		Attendance: 8,274

Wednesday, 11 November	Featherstone Rovers	23 – 15	Australia	Post Office Road, Featherstone
		[ Report]		Attendance: 7,671

Saturday, 14 November	Wigan	16 – 9	Australia	Central Park, Wigan
		[ Report]		Attendance: 24,466

==== Second Test ====
The Kangaroos went within one penalty goal of becoming the first All-Australian team to win The Ashes on British soil and the first touring side to win The Ashes since 1911-12. However, the Lions survived and the series would go on to a deciding 3rd test.

Saturday, 21 November

Great Britain	11 – 10	Australia
Tries: Neil Fox; Don Robinson; Johnny Whiteley; Goals: Neil Fox (1)		Tries: Brian Carlson (2) Goals: Keith Barnes (1); Brian Carlson (1)

Headingley, Leeds
Attendance: 30,301
Referee: R. Gelder (England)

Great Britain	Position	Australia
1. Frank Dyson	FB	1. Keith Barnes (c)
2. Ike Southward	WG	4. Eddie Lumsden
3. Eric Ashton	CE	8. Harry Wells
4. Neil Fox	CE	7. Reg Gasnier
5. Mick Sullivan	WG	3. Brian Carlson
6. Dave Bolton	SO	16. Brian Clay
7. Jeff Stevenson (c)	SH	12. Barry Muir
10. Don Robinson	PR	22. Gary Parcell
9. Tommy Harris	HK	26. Ian Walsh
8. Abe Terry	PR	21. Billy Wilson
12. Don Vines	SR	17. Elton Rasmussen
11. Brian McTigue	SR	18. Rex Mossop
13. Johnny Whiteley	LF	19. Brian Hambly
Jim Challinor	Coach	Clive Churchill

Wednesday, 25 November	Swinton	24 – 25	Australia	Station Road, Swinton
		[ Report]		Attendance: 5,021

Saturday, 28 November	Wakefield Trinity	20 – 10	Australia	Belle Vue, Wakefield
		[ Report]		Attendance: 17,615

Wednesday, 2 December	Huddersfield	7 – 21	Australia	Fartown, Huddersfield
		[ Report]		Attendance: 2,349

Saturday, 5 December	Hunslet	11 – 12	Australia	Parkside, Hunslet
		[ Report]		Attendance: 8,061

==== Third Test ====
This would be the final time that Great Britain (or England) would win the Ashes on home soil (as of 2017).

Saturday, 12 December

Great Britain	18 – 12	Australia
Tries: Neil Fox; Ike Southward; Goals: Neil Fox (6)		Tries: Brian Carlson; Johnny Raper; Goals: Keith Barnes (3)

Central Park, Wigan
Attendance: 26,089
Referee: Eric Clay (England)

Great Britain	Position	Australia
1. Gerry Round	FB	1. Keith Barnes (c)
2. Ike Southward	WG	3. Eddie Lumsden
3. Eric Ashton	CE	8. Harry Wells
4. Neil Fox	CE	7. Reg Gasnier
5. Mick Sullivan	WG	4. Brian Carlson
6. Dave Bolton	SO	16. Brian Clay
7. Jeff Stevenson (c)	SH	12. Barry Muir
15. Jack Wilkinson	PR	21. Billy Wilson
9. Tommy Harris	HK	26. Ian Walsh
8. Abe Terry	PR	24. Dud Beattie
10. Don Robinson	SR	19. Brian Hambly
11. Brian McTigue	SR	18. Rex Mossop
13. Johnny Whiteley	LF	15. Johnny Raper
Jim Challinor	Coach	Clive Churchill

== France ==
The first test against France was played while The Kangaroos were still completing the British leg.

=== First Test ===
Australia won the first test against the French at the Parc des Princes in Paris. Kangaroos winger Eddie Lumsden crossed for 3 tries while legendary winger Ken Irvine made the first of 33 test appearances for Australia.

Saturday, 31 October

France	19 – 20	Australia
Tries: Aldo Quaglio Goals: Andre Lacaze (6); Field Goals: Andre Lacaze (2)		Tries: Eddie Lumsden (3); Harry Wells; Goals: Keith Barnes (4)

Parc des Princes, Paris
Attendance: 9,864
Referee: Georges Jameau (France)
Player of the Match: Eddie Lumsden

France	Position	Australia
André Lacaze	FB	Keith Barnes (c)
Maurice Voron	WG	Eddie Lumsden
Jacques Merquey (c)	CE	Harry Wells
Antoine Jimenez	CE	Reg Gasnier
André Savonne	WG	Ken Irvine
Gilbert Benausse	SO	Tony Brown
Georges Fages	SH	Barry Muir
Jean Panno	PR	Gary Parcell
Antranick Appelian	HK	Ian Walsh
Aldo Quaglio	PR	Dud Beattie
Robert Eramouspé	SR	Jim Paterson
Jean Aubert	SR	Rex Mossop
Serge Tonus	LF	Brian Hambly
	Coach	Clive Churchill

Thursday, 17 December	French Army XIII	2 – 15	Australia	Stade Marcel Saupin, Nantes
		[ Report]		Attendance: 993

=== Second Test ===
Sunday, 20 December

France	2 – 17	Australia
Tries: Raymond Gruppi; G. Velvaud Goals; Claude Mantoulan (1)		Tries: Brian Carlson; Johnny Raper; Harry Wells; Goals; Keith Barnes (4)

Stade Municipal, Bordeaux
Attendance: 8,848
Referee: A. Cassan (France)

France	Position	Australia
Claude Mantoulan	FB	Keith Barnes (c)
Maurice Voron	WG	Brian Carlson
Jean Foussat	CE	Harry Wells
Antoine Jimenez (c)	CE	Reg Gasnier
André Savonne	WG	Eddie Lumsden
Robert Moulinas	SO	Johnny Raper
Rene Jean	SH	Barry Muir
Honoré Conti	PR	Billy Wilson
André Casas	HK	Ian Walsh
Marcel Bescos	PR	Dud Beattie
Robert Eramouspé	SR	Gary Parcell
Jean Barthe	SR	Brian Hambly
Serge Tonus	LF	Brian Clay
	Coach	Clive Churchill

Thursday, 24 December	Villeneuve XIII RLLG	5 – 11	Australia	Stade Max Rousie, Villeneuve-sur-Lot
		[ Report]		Attendance: 1,458

Friday, 25 December	Racing Club Albi XIII	19 – 10	Australia	Stade Municipal d'Albi, Albi
		[ Report]		Attendance: 5,845

Sunday, 27 December	Carcassonne / Lézignan XIII	32 – 9	Australia	Stade d'Albert Domec, Carcassonne
		[ Report]		Attendance: 6,364

Friday, 1 January	XIII Catalan	8 – 32	Australia	Stade Jean-Laffon, Perpignan
		[ Report]		Attendance: 6,364

Sunday, 3 January	Montpellier	13 – 44	Australia	Stade Sabathé, Montpellier
		[ Report]		Attendance: 3,741

Thursday, 7 January	Racing Club Marseille XIII	7 – 38	Australia	Stade Vélodrome, Marseille
		[ Report]		Attendance: 1,366

Thursday, 14 January	Avignon / Cavaillon XIII	5 – 65	Australia	Parc des Sports, Avignon
		[ Report]		Attendance: 2,806

=== Third Test ===
Wednesday, 20 January

France	8 – 16	Australia
Tries: Raymond Gruppi; Gérard Bélivaud Goals; André Lacaze (1)		Tries: Johnny Raper (2); Reg Gasnier; Brian Hambly; Goals; Keith Barnes (2)

Parc des Sports, Roanne
Attendance: 6,932
Referee: Georges Jameau (France)

France	Position	Australia
André Lacaze	FB	Keith Barnes (c)
Raymond Gruppi	WG	Eddie Lumsden
Jean Foussat	CE	Harry Wells
Gérard Bélivaud	CE	Reg Gasnier
André Savonne	WG	Brian Carlson
Claude Mantoulan	SO	Johnny Raper
Bernard Fabre	SH	Barry Muir
Honoré Conti	PR	Billy Wilson
André Casas	HK	Ian Walsh
Marcel Bescos	PR	Elton Rasmussen
Pierre Laurent	SR	Jim Paterson
Serge Tonus	SR	Brian Hambly
Georges Fages	LF	Brian Clay
	Coach	Clive Churchill

== Italy ==
To finish the tour, the Kangaroos played two games against an Italian representative team.

Saturday, 23 January

Italy	15 – 37	Australia
Tries: Giovanni Fiorin; Luigi Luise; Natale Molari Goals; Alberto Comin (2)		Tries: Eddie Lumsden (5); Rex Mossop (2); Ken Irvine; Harry Wells; Goals; Keith Barnes (5)

Stadio Silvio Appiani, Padua
Attendance: 3,500
Referee: R. Somma (Italy)
Player of the Match: Eddie Lumsden crossed for 5 tries in this game.

Italy	Position	Australia
Mimmo Pozzi	FB	Keith Barnes (c)
Natale Molari	WG	Eddie Lumsden
Alberto Comin	CE	Johnny Riley
Luigi Luise	CE	Harry Wells
Gian Carlo Tagini	WG	Ken Irvine
Gianfranco Marazzina	SO	John Raper
Ferdy Sartorato	SH	Barry Muir
Carlo Guglielmino	PR	Billy Wilson
Giovanni Bortolozzo	HK	Ian Walsh
Giovanni Fiorin	PR	Bill Delamare
Gastone Biadene	SR	Gary Parcell
Giovanni Vigna	SR	Rex Mossop
Gilberto Ruffo	LF	Brian Hambly
	Coach	Clive Churchill

Sunday, 24 January

Italy	22 – 67	Australia
Tries: Francesco Bovo (2); Augusto De Pase; Sergio Gei; Silvio Pavan; Gilberto Ruffo Goals; Alberto Comin (2)		Tries: Ken Irvine (6); Tony Brown (2); Peter Burke (2); Ian Walsh (2); Darrel Chapman; Bill Delamare; Jim Paterson; Goals; Keith Barnes (7); Brian Clay; Brian Hambly; Noel Kelly; Ian Walsh

Stadio Omobono Tenni, Treviso
Attendance: 3,105
Referee: T. Rossi (Italy)
Player of the Match: Ken Irvine crossed for 6 tries in this game.

Italy	Position	Australia
Alberto Comin	FB	Keith Barnes (c)
Augusto De Pase	WG	Eddie Lumsden
Giampaolo Pavin	CE	Darrel Chapman
Ferdy Sartorato	CE	Brian Hambly
Silvio Pavan	WG	Ken Irvine
Oreste Dolfin	SO	Tony Brown
Francesco Bovo	SH	Peter Burke
Carlo Masotti	PR	Ian Walsh
Sergio Gei	HK	Noel Kelly
Marco Martini	PR	Bill Delamare
Gilberto Ruffo	SR	Jim Paterson
Renzo Grigoli	SR	Elton Rasmussen
Giovanni Bortolozzo	LF	Brian Clay
	Coach	Clive Churchill
