= 1962 NSWRFL season =

Rugby league competition

1962 New South Wales Rugby Football League
- Teams: 10
- Premiers: St. George (9th title)
- Minor premiers: St. George (8th title)
- Matches played: 94
- Points scored: 2683
- Attendance: 963433
- Top points scorer(s): Don Parish (123)
- Wooden spoon: South Sydney (3rd spoon)
- Top try-scorer(s): Eddie Lumsden (21)

The 1962 NSWRFL season was the 55th New South Wales Rugby Football League premiership, Australia's first rugby league competition. Ten teams from across Sydney competed for the J J Giltinan Shield and WD & HO Wills Cup during the season, which culminated in a replay of the previous year's grand final between St. George and Western Suburbs.

== Season summary ==
The league approved the use of substitutions to replace injured players, on the condition that the replacement player had already appeared in a lower grade match on the same day.

The 1962 season was also the last in the playing career of future Australian Rugby League Hall of Fame inductee, Brian Carlson.

=== Teams ===
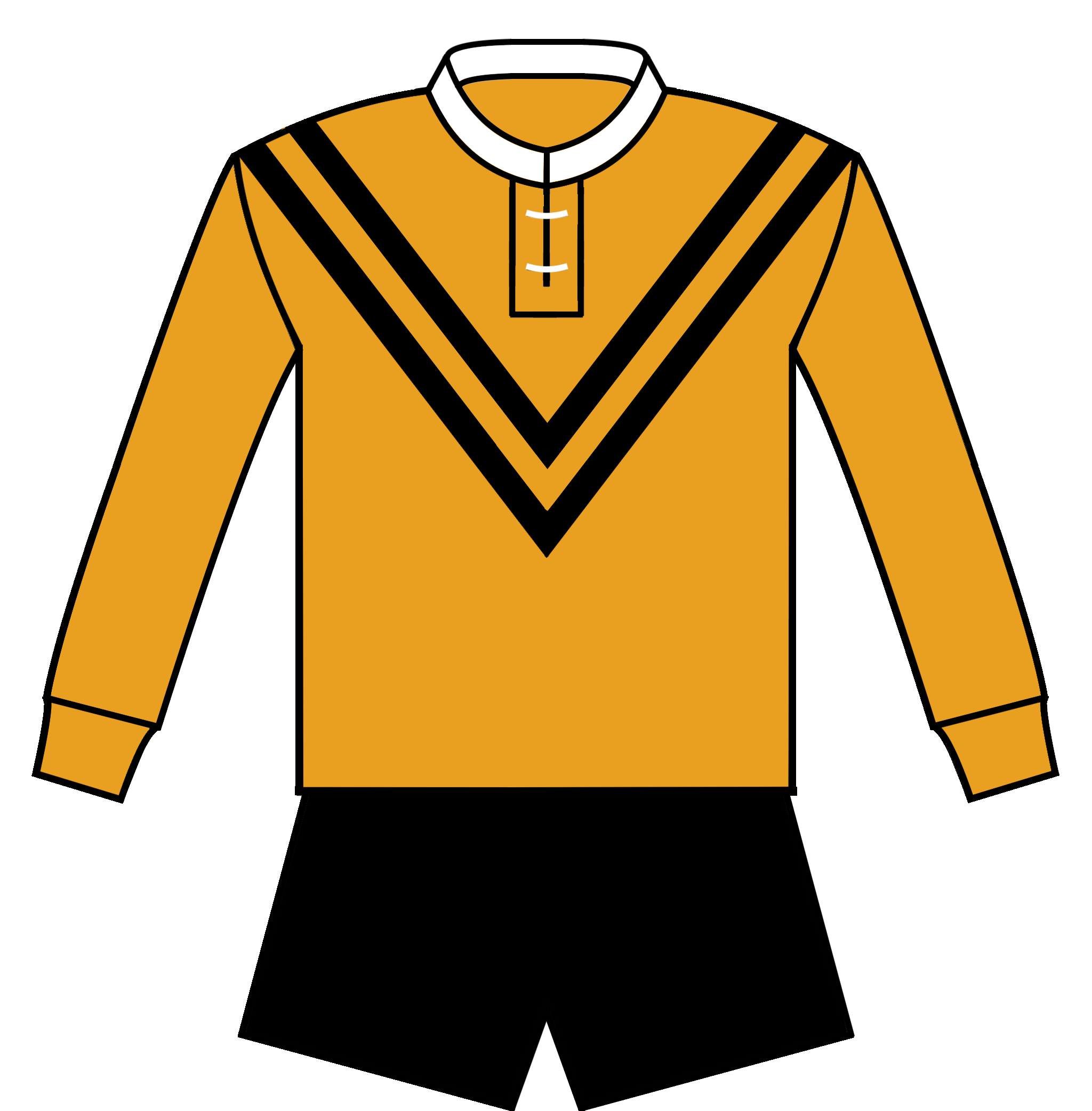
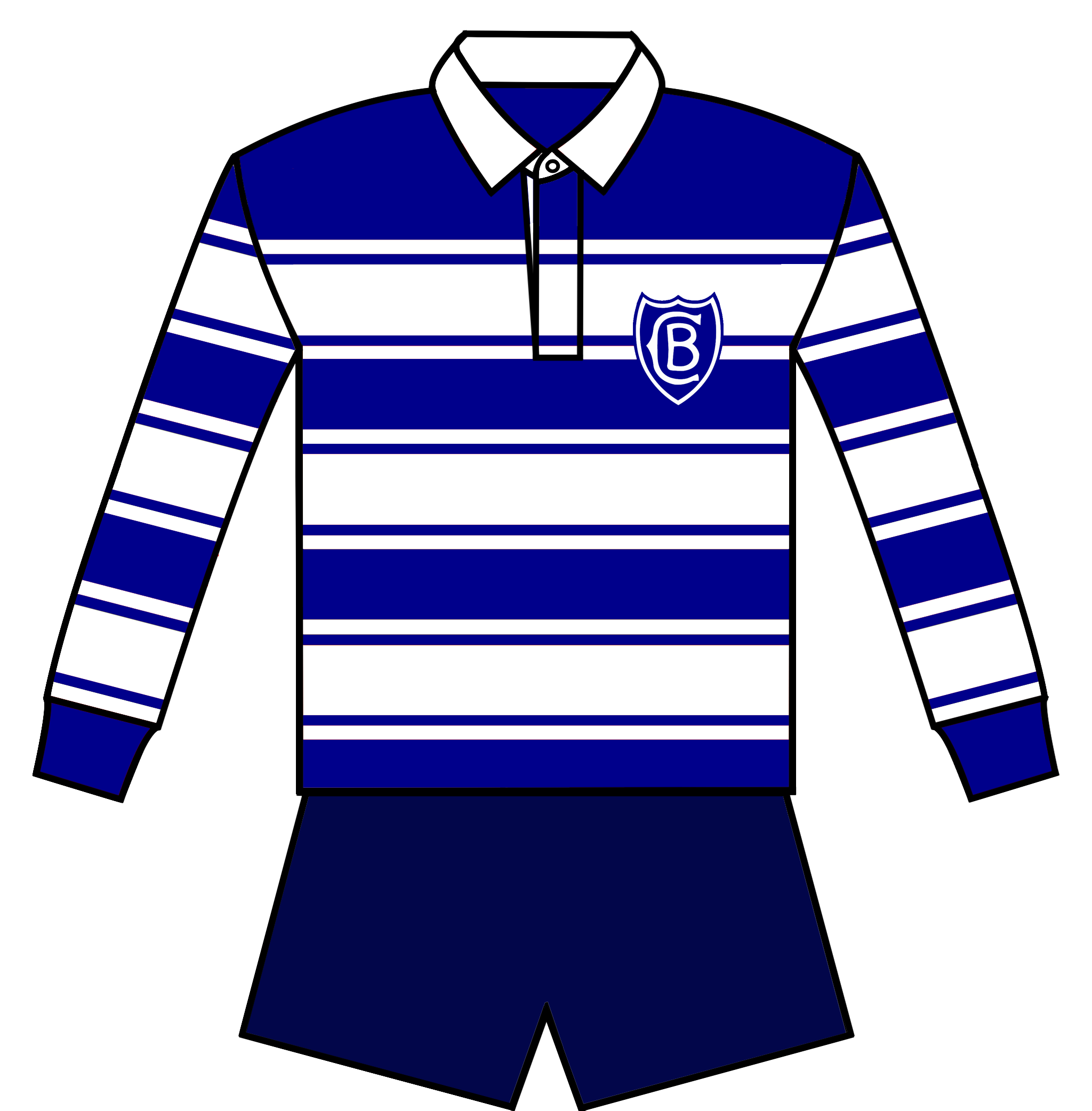
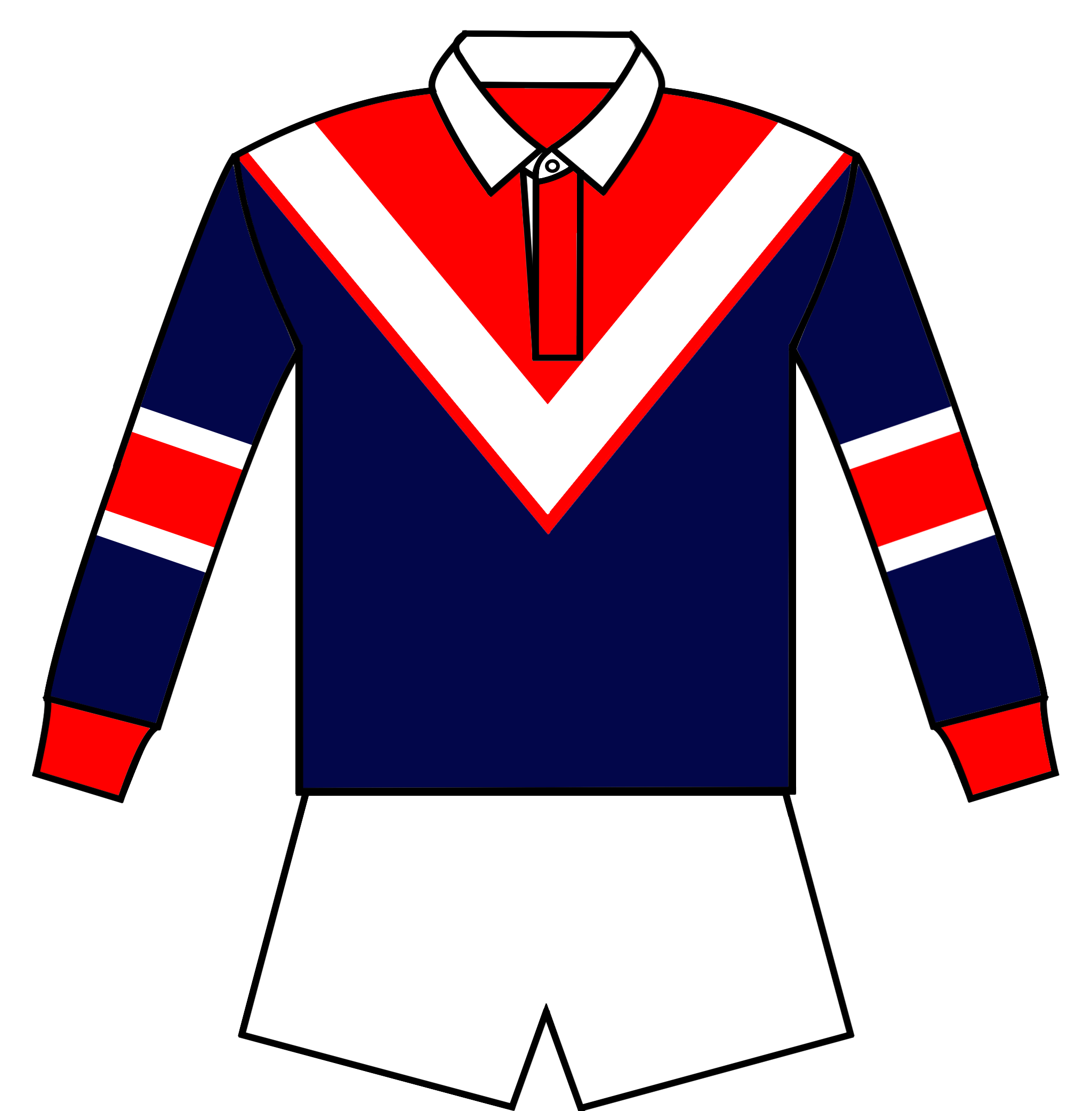
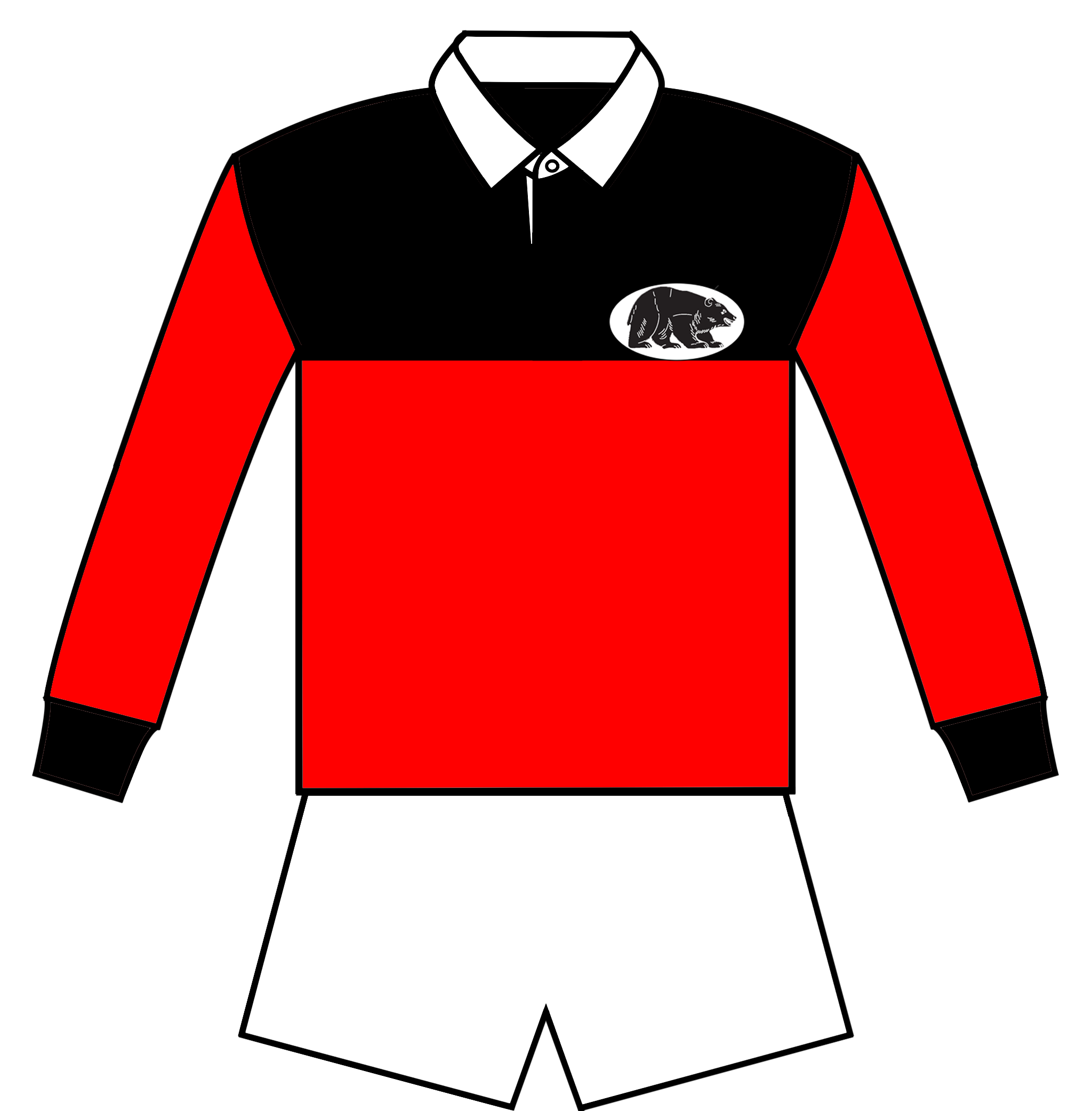
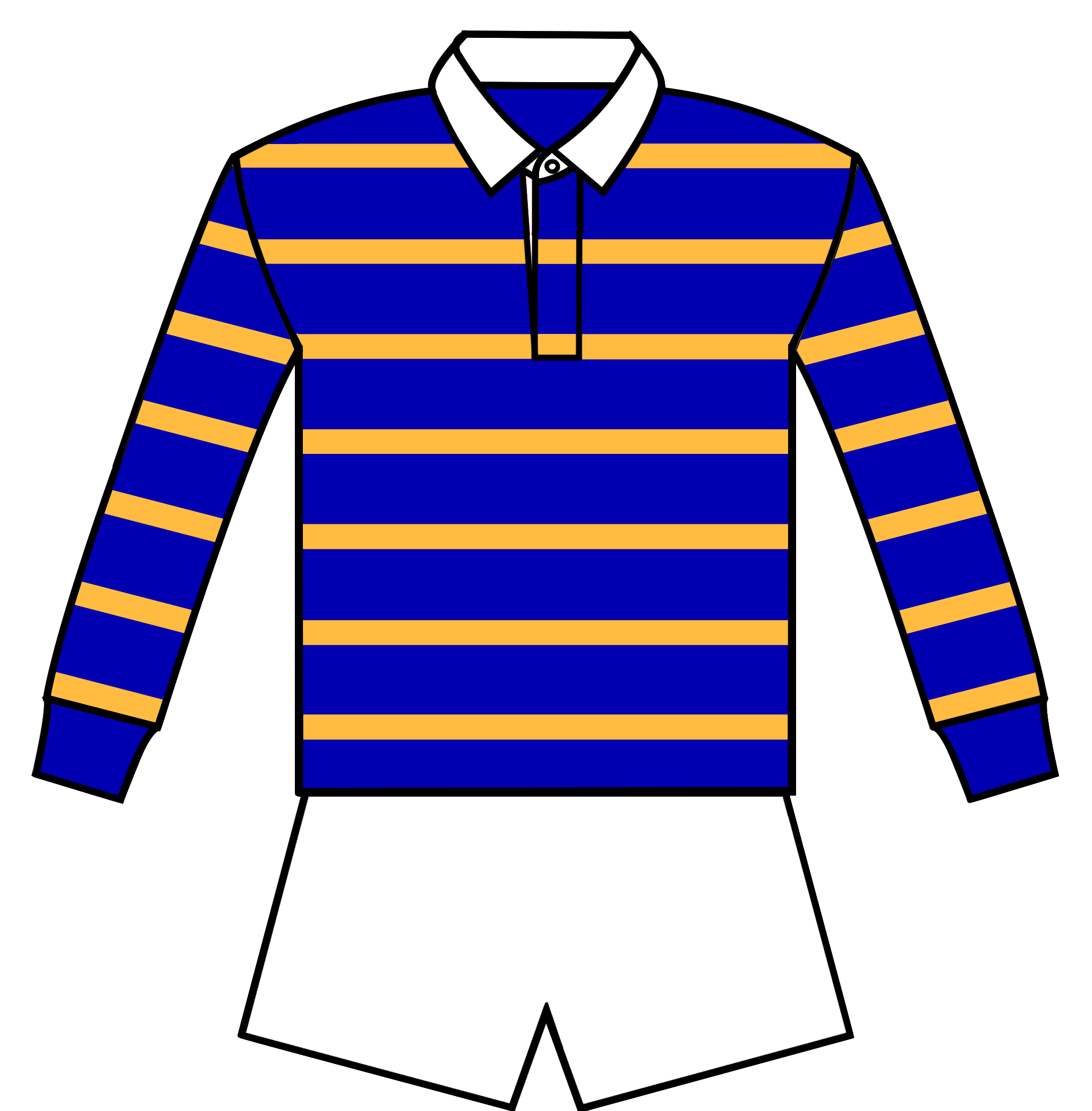
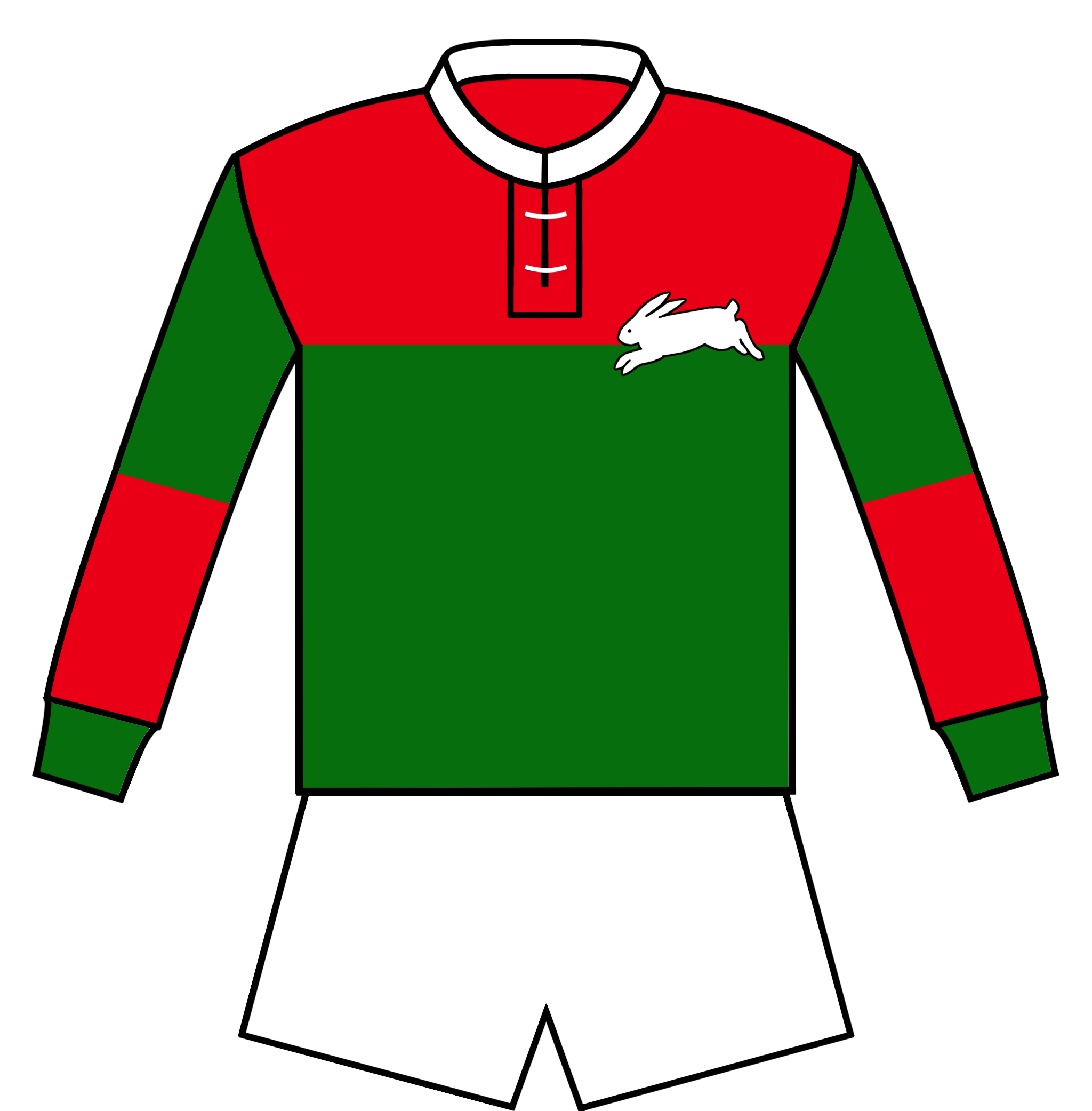
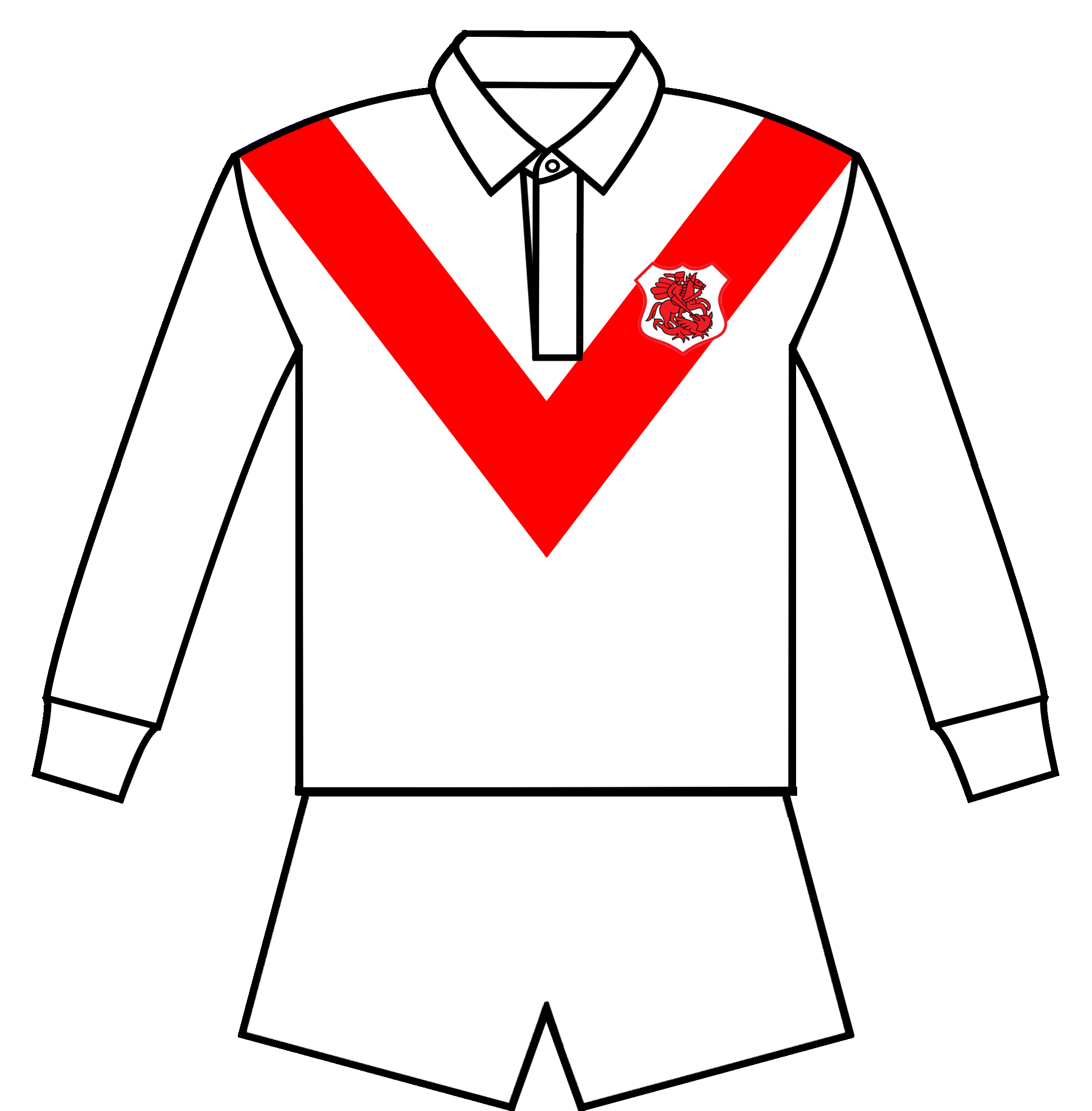
Balmain 55th season Ground: Leichhardt Oval; Coach: Harry Bath; Captain: Billy Bischoff Jr.	Canterbury-Bankstown 28th season Ground: Belmore Sports Ground; Coach: Eddie Burns; Captain: Ray Beavan, Brian Davies	Eastern Suburbs 55th season Ground: Sydney Sports Ground; Coach: Dick Dunn; Captain: Terry Fearnley	Manly-Warringah 16th season Ground: Brookvale Oval; Captain-Coach: Ron Willey	Newtown 55th season Ground: Henson Park; Coach: Allan Ellis; Captain: Tony Brown & Barry Nelson
North Sydney 55th season Ground: North Sydney Oval; Coach: Bob Sullivan; Captain: Brian Carlson	Parramatta 16th season Ground: Cumberland Oval; Coach: Ken Kearney; Captain: Ron Lynch	South Sydney 55th season Ground: Redfern Oval; Coach: Denis Donoghue; Captain: Darrel Chapman	St. George 42nd season Ground: Jubilee Oval; Captain-coach: Norm Provan	Western Suburbs 55th season Ground: Pratten Park; Coach: Jack Fitzgerald; Captain: Arthur Summons, Kel O'Shea

== Regular season ==
Team	1	2	3	4	5	6	7	8	9	10	11	12	13	14	15	16	17	18	F1	F2	F3	GF
Balmain	**STG** **+8**	MAN; 0	**CBY** **−17**	SOU −7	**WES** **−21**	NOR +4	**PAR** **−9**	NEW −3	**EAS** **−3**	**STG**; **0**	**MAN** **+8**	CBY −5	**SOU** **−1**	WES −20	**NOR** **+10**	PAR +5	**NEW** **−1**	EAS −11				
Canterbury-Bankstown	NEW −3	**EAS** **+24**	BAL +17	**MAN** **+23**	STG −20	SOU +5	**WES** **−12**	NOR −7	PAR; 0	**NEW** **−22**	EAS −5	**BAL** **+5**	MAN −2	STG −21	**SOU** **−2**	WES; 0	**NOR** **+12**	**PAR** **+1**				
Eastern Suburbs	**MAN** **−4**	CBY −24	SOU; 0	WES −13	**NOR** **−16**	PAR −3	**NEW** **+2**	**STG** **−3**	BAL +3	MAN −6	**CBY** **+5**	**SOU** **+17**	**WES** **+4**	NOR +4	**PAR** **+15**	NEW −10	**STG** **+1**	**BAL** **+11**				
Manly-Warringah	EAS +4	**BAL**; **0**	STG −12	CBY −23	**SOU** **+3**	WES −9	**NOR** **+26**	**PAR** **−3**	NEW −6	**EAS** **+6**	BAL −8	**STG** **−12**	**CBY** **+2**	SOU +6	**WES** **−3**	NOR −11	PAR +5	**NEW** **−1**				
Newtown	**CBY** **+3**	SOU +2	WES −4	NOR +8	PAR +6	**STG** **−11**	EAS −2	**BAL** **+3**	**MAN** **+6**	CBY +22	**SOU** **+12**	**WES** **−7**	**NOR** **+13**	**PAR** **−4**	**STG** **+1**	**EAS** **+10**	BAL +1	MAN +1	X	STG −21	**WES** **−12**	
North Sydney	WES −3	**STG** **−8**	PAR; 0	**NEW** **−8**	EAS +16	**BAL** **−4**	MAN −26	**CBY** **+7**	**SOU** **+1**	**WES** **−13**	STG −25	**PAR** **−7**	NEW −13	**EAS** **−4**	BAL −10	**MAN** **+11**	CBY −12	SOU; 0				
Parramatta	SOU −7	**WES** **+2**	**NOR**; **0**	STG −21	**NEW** **−6**	**EAS** **+3**	BAL +9	MAN +3	**CBY**; **0**	**SOU** **+27**	WES +12	NOR +7	**STG** **+11**	NEW +4	EAS −15	**BAL** **−5**	**MAN** **−5**	CBY −1	WES −6			
South Sydney	**PAR** **+7**	**NEW** **−2**	**EAS**; **0**	**BAL** **+7**	MAN −3	**CBY** **−5**	STG −17	**WES** **−5**	NOR −1	PAR −27	NEW −12	EAS −17	BAL +1	**MAN** **−6**	CBY +2	**STG** **−34**	WES −13	**NOR**; **0**				
St. George	BAL −8	NOR +8	**MAN** **+12**	**PAR** **+21**	**CBY** **+20**	NEW +11	**SOU** **+17**	EAS +3	WES +8	BAL; 0	**NOR** **+25**	MAN +12	PAR −11	**CBY** **+21**	NEW −1	SOU +34	EAS −1	WES +8	X	**NEW** **+21**	X	**WES** **+3**
Western Suburbs	**NOR** **+3**	PAR −2	**NEW** **+4**	**EAS** **+13**	BAL +21	**MAN** **+9**	CBY +12	SOU +5	**STG** **−8**	NOR +13	**PAR** **−12**	NEW +7	EAS −4	**BAL** **+20**	MAN +3	**CBY**; **0**	**SOU** **+13**	**STG** **−8**	**PAR** **+6**	X	NEW +12	STG −3
Team	1	2	3	4	5	6	7	8	9	10	11	12	13	14	15	16	17	18	F1	F2	F3	GF

Bold – Home game
X – Bye
Opponent for round listed above margin

== Ladder ==
	Team	Pld	W	D	L	PF	PA	PD	Pts
1	St. George	18	13	1	4	373	194	+179	27
2	Newtown	18	13	0	5	290	230	+60	26
3	Western Suburbs	18	12	1	5	299	210	+89	25
4	Parramatta	18	9	2	7	236	218	+18	20
5	Eastern Suburbs	18	9	1	8	213	230	-17	19
6	Canterbury	18	7	2	9	228	235	-7	16
7	Manly	18	7	1	10	234	270	-36	15
8	Balmain	18	5	2	11	237	300	-63	12
9	North Sydney	18	4	2	12	263	361	-98	10
10	South Sydney	18	4	2	12	212	337	-125	10

=== Ladder progression ===
- Numbers highlighted in green indicate that the team finished the round inside the top 4.
- Numbers highlighted in blue indicates the team finished first on the ladder in that round.
- Numbers highlighted in red indicates the team finished last place on the ladder in that round.

	Team	1	2	3	4	5	6	7	8	9	10	11	12	13	14	15	16	17	18
1	St. George	0	2	4	6	8	10	12	14	16	17	19	21	21	23	23	25	25	27
2	Newtown	2	4	4	6	8	8	8	10	12	14	16	16	18	18	20	22	24	26
3	Western Suburbs	2	2	4	6	8	10	12	14	14	16	16	18	18	20	22	23	25	25
4	Parramatta	0	2	3	3	3	5	7	9	10	12	14	16	18	20	20	20	20	20
5	Eastern Suburbs	0	0	1	1	1	1	3	3	5	5	7	9	11	13	15	15	17	19
6	Canterbury-Bankstown	0	2	4	6	6	8	8	8	9	9	9	11	11	11	11	12	14	16
7	Manly-Warringah	2	3	3	3	5	5	7	7	7	9	9	9	11	13	13	13	15	15
8	Balmain	2	3	3	3	3	5	5	5	5	6	8	8	8	8	10	12	12	12
9	North Sydney	0	0	1	1	3	3	3	5	7	7	7	7	7	7	7	9	9	10
10	South Sydney	2	2	3	5	5	5	5	5	5	5	5	5	7	7	9	9	9	10

== Finals ==
Home	Score	Away	Match information
Home	Score	Away	Date and time	Venue	Referee	Crowd
Semi-finals
Western Suburbs	6–0	Parramatta	25 August 1962	Sydney Sports Ground	Darcy Lawler	26,281
St. George	30–9	Newtown	1 September 1962	Sydney Cricket Ground	Col Pearce	36,058
Preliminary Final
Newtown	13–25	Western Suburbs	8 September 1962	Sydney Cricket Ground	Col Pearce	26,554
Grand Final
St. George	9–6	Western Suburbs	15 September 1962	Sydney Cricket Ground	Jack Bradley	41,184

=== Grand Final ===
St. George	Position	Western Suburbs
15. Kevin McDonald	FB	1. Kevin Bray
2. Eddie Lumsden	WG	2. Dave Barsley
3. Reg Gasnier	CE	3. Fred Norden
19. Johnny Riley	CE	14. Gil MacDougall
5. Johnny King	WG	5. Peter Dimond
8. Johnny Raper	FE	7. Arthur Summons (c)
21. George Evans	HB	6. Don Malone
25. Monty Porter	PR	9. John Hayes
12. Ian Walsh	HK	12. Noel Kelly
11. Billy Wilson	PR	11. Denis Meaney
10. Norm Provan (Ca./Co)	SR	13. Jim Cody
9. Kevin Ryan	SR	4. Garry Russell
13. Elton Rasmussen	LK	8. Kevin Smyth
	Coach	Jack Fitzgerald

Wests had finished third on the ladder but won two semi-finals for another crack at their nemesis in a rain-soaked and muddy Grand Final. St George were favoured by a strong breeze in the first half which dropped off in the second half, giving Wests no reciprocal advantage.

The only try of the match was scored in the 17th minute after Norm Provan burst through and found Kevin Ryan in support who in turn found Johnny King on the fly. The winger raced 30 yards over sodden ground to score, notching up another Grand Final try in his unblemished consistent record.

The score was 7–2 at half time, with the Dragons playing almost all the second half with twelve men after Billy “Bluey” Wilson was sent off.

The match was a tight forward struggle with misdemeanors from both sides. Provan and Rasmussen finished the game needing stitches and Jim Cody and Garry Russell suffered broken noses. Wests did all they could to contain Reg Gasnier with Gill McDougall enjoying some success in hammering Gasnier and keeping him bottled up.

Saints' best were Ryan, Ian Walsh and Johnny Raper playing at five-eighth in place of Brian Clay whose injury prone season had ended early with a broken arm.

The game is remembered for a couple of off-the-ball incidents which began with Provan being knocked out by Jim Cody five minutes before half time. “Sticks” Provan was carried from the field and didn't return again until well into the second half. Cody escaped any official punishment. Wilson came out as captain in the second half and apparently squared things up in the first seconds after kick-off before the first tackle took place. Accounts differ as to whether “Bluey” Wilson was provoked by Cody before Wilson hit him, but hit him he did and referee Jack Bradley sent Wilson off. With no replacements allowed in those days, St George were reduced to 11 men until Provan returned to the field 15 minutes later.

In what can only be described as a heroic defensive effort, St George held out Wests and won the match.

The match was Billy Wilson's final game for St George; he had appeared in six of the Grand Final victories. The Larry Writer reference suggests that the send-off may have soured Wilson's relationship with club officials in spite of the victory. Whether true or not, at 35 years of age, the end of Wilson's playing career was looming from the club's perspective and his contract was not renewed.

As of the 2015 NRL season, no forward since Wilson has been sent off in a Grand Final. In this game Wilson also became the only man to have been sent off in two grand finals following on from his dismissal by Darcy Lawler in 1953 for fighting with South Sydney's Martin Gallagher.

St. George 9 (Tries: King. Goals: McDonald 3.)

Western Suburbs 6 ( Goals: Bray 3.)

== Player statistics ==
The following statistics are as of the conclusion of Round 18.

Top 5 point scorers

Points	Player	Tries	Goals	Field Goals
116	Bob Landers	6	49	0
109	Don Parish	7	44	0
105	Ron Willey	1	51	0
102	Brian Graham	0	51	0
90	Brian Carlson	2	42	0

Top 5 try scorers

Tries	Player
21	Eddie Lumsden
15	Ken Irvine
14	Johnny King
12	Reg Gasnier
12	Peter Dimond
12	Ken Foord
12	Len Wadling
12	Michael Cleary

Top 5 goal scorers

Goals	Player
51	Brian Graham
51	Ron Willey
49	Bob Landers
44	Don Parish
42	Brian Carlson
