= Nev Callaghan =

Australian rugby league player

Personal information
- Full name: Neville Alan Callaghan
- Born: 17 February 1936 Rockhampton, Queensland
- Died: 3 December 2016 (aged 80) Rockhampton, Queensland

Playing information
Club
Years	Team	Pld	T	G	FG	P
1950	Colts	?
1951–59	Fitzroys	?
	Total		0	0	0	0
Representative
Years	Team	Pld	T	G	FG	P
1956	Central Queensland	1
1959	Queensland	1

Neville Alan Callaghan (17 February 1936 – 3 December 2016) was an Australian rugby league player, who played one representative game for Queensland in 1959.

== Rugby league ==
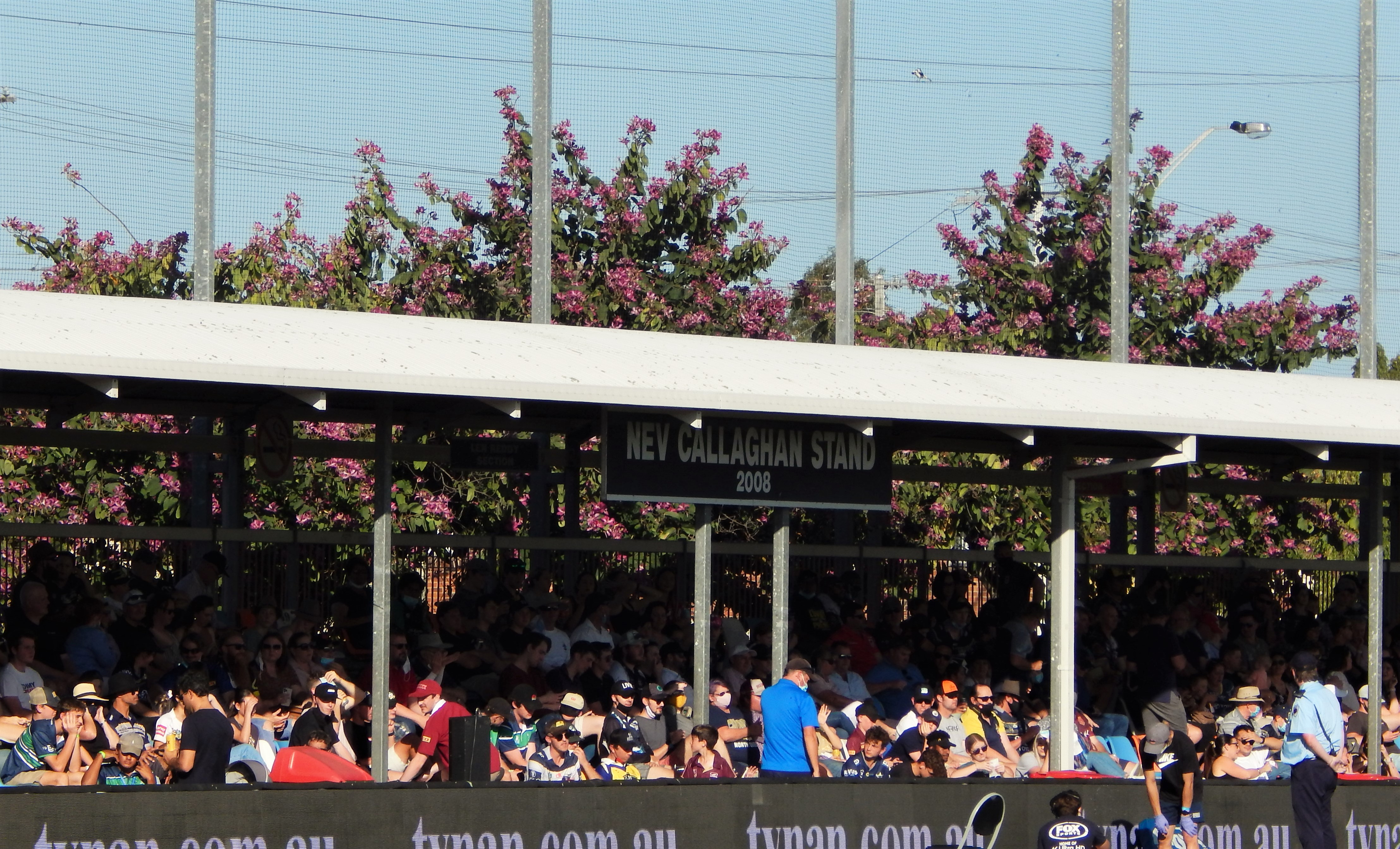
Spectators in the Nev Callaghan Stand at Browne Park watching an NRL match between the St. George Illawarra Dragons and the North Queensland Cowboys in 2021

Born in Rockhampton, Callaghan became interested in rugby league as a primary school student when Cyril Connell Jnr. took up a teaching position at Allenstown State School in 1947.

After playing the sport at school, Callaghan rose through the junior rugby league grades through the 1950s while playing for local clubs Colts and then Fitzroys. He was acknowledged as being Fitzroys' most improved junior player in 1954.

In 1956, he represented Central Queensland when he played in the second row against New Zealand at the Rockhampton Showgrounds during the 1956 New Zealand rugby league tour of Australia.

Callaghan's career highlight came in 1959 when he was selected to play as a hooker for Queensland in the second game of the 1959 Interstate series at Lang Park on 30 May 1959 as a replacement for an injured Noel Kelly. Playing in a team alongside Elton Rasmussen, Bob Banks, Barry Muir, Paul Pyers, Dud Beattie, Henry Holloway and Jim Paterson, it was seen that Callaghan had a promising rugby league career.

However, that same year Callaghan decided to retire from the sport at the age of 24 due to issues with his knees and his desire to go into business. In later years, Callaghan openly expressed regret at the premature end to his rugby league career. In 2012, Callaghan said he "retired too early" because he "couldn't afford to get hurt".

Despite this, Callaghan continued his involvement with rugby league in Rockhampton. In 2008, a new undercover seating area at Browne Park was named the Nev Callaghan Stand in his honour, in recognition of his service to the sport.

== Business ==
With Mick Docherty, Callaghan established a local automotive dealership in Rockhampton called DC Motors in 1959. The business grew to become a respected company in Central Queensland which continues to trade although Docherty died in 1981 with Callaghan selling the business in 2006.

== Death ==
Callaghan died on 3 December 2016, prompting tributes from various sporting, political and community figures.
