= Gary Parcell =

Australia international rugby league footballer (1933–2020)

Personal information
- Born: 21 July 1933
- Died: 30 November 2020 (aged 87)

Playing information
- Position: Prop
Club
Years	Team	Pld	T	G	FG	P
	Brothers (Ipswich)
Representative
Years	Team	Pld	T	G	FG	P
1956–62	Queensland	14	1	0	0	3
1959–62	Australia	8	0	0	0	0
- Relatives: Matt Parcell (grandson)

Gary Parcell was an Australian professional rugby league footballer who played in the 1950s and 1960s. A Queensland interstate and Australia international representative forward, he played his club football in Ipswich for Brothers.

The son of Queensland Maroons forward, Percy Parcell, Gary, like his father, played for the Ipswich Rugby League's Brothers club.

In 1959, Queensland won the interstate series against New South Wales 3–1, but managed only seven players in a Kangaroo touring party of 26. They were Parcell Elton Rasmussen, Jim Paterson, Dud Beattie, Noel Kelly, Barry Muir and Ron Boden, with Boden originally from NSW.

In 1959 Parcell was first selected for the Australian national team, becoming Kangaroo No. 356.

Parcell is the grandfather of current Hull KR player Matt Parcell.
