= List of Parramatta Eels coaches =

There have been 31 coaches of the Parramatta Eels since their first season in 1947.

== List of coaches ==
As of the end of the 2025 NRL season

No.	Name	Seasons	Games	Wins	Losses	Draws	Winning Percentage	Premiers	Runners-up	Minor premiers	Wooden spoons
1	Frank McMillan	1947	18	3	15	0	16.7&	-	-	-	1947
2	Vic Hey	1948−1953	108	36	63	9	33.3%	-	-	-	1952
3	Charlie Gill	1954	18	3	15	0	16.7%	-	-	-	1954
4	Johnny Slade	1955	18	5	13	0	27.8%	-	-	-	-
5	Cec Fifield	1956	18	4	13	1	22.2%	-	-	-	1956
6	Ken Slattery	1957	18	2	16	0	11.1%	-	-	-	1957
7	Jack Rayner	1958−1960	54	7	47	0	13%	-	-	-	1958, 1959, 1960
8	Ron Boden	1961	18	3	15	0	16.7%	-	-	-	1961
9	Ken Kearney	1962−1964	59	35	22	2	59.3%	-	-	-	-
10	Ken Thornett	1965−1966	37	19	15	3	51.4%	-	-	-	-
11	Brian Hambly	1967	22	8	14	0	36.4%	-	-	-	-
12	Ian Johnston	1968−1969	44	23	20	1	52.3%	-	-	-	-
13	Ron Lynch	1970	22	4	18	0	18.2%	-	-	-	1970
14	Ian Walsh	1971−1972	45	16	27	2	35.6%	-	-	-	1972
15	Dave Bolton	1973−1974	44	11	33	0	25%	-	-	-	-
16	Norm Provan	1975	27	14	12	1	51.9%	-	-	-	-
17	Terry Fearnley	1976−1979	101	68	29	4	67.3%	-	1976, 1977	1977	-
18	John Peard	1980	22	11	9	2	50%	-	-	-	-
19	Jack Gibson	1981−1983	84	61	22	1	73%	1981, 1982, 1983	-	1982	-
20	John Monie	1984−1989	149	86	62	1	57.7%	1986	1984	1986	-
21	Mick Cronin	1990−1993	88	33	53	2	37.5%	-	-	-	-
22	Ron Hilditch	1994−1996	65	19	44	2	29.2%	-	-	-	-
23	Brian Smith	1997−2006	243	138	98	7	57%	-	2001	2001, 2005	-
24	Jason Taylor	2006	16	10	6	0	62.5%	-	-	-	-
25	Michael Hagan	2007−2008	51	26	25	0	51%	-	-	-	-
26	Daniel Anderson	2009−2010	52	25	26	1	48.1%	-	2009	-	-
27	Stephen Kearney	2011−2012	42	10	31	1	23.8%	-	-	-	2012
28	Brad Arthur	2012, 2014−2024	264	137	127	0	52%	-	2022	-	2018
29	Ricky Stuart	2013	24	5	19	0	20.8%	-	-	-	2013
30	Trent Barrett	2024	14	4	10	0	29%	-	-	-	-
31	Jason Ryles	2025-present	24	10	14	0	42%	-	-	-	-

== See also ==
- List of current NRL coaches
- List of current NRL Women's coaches
