= Matt Parcell =

Australian professional rugby league footballer

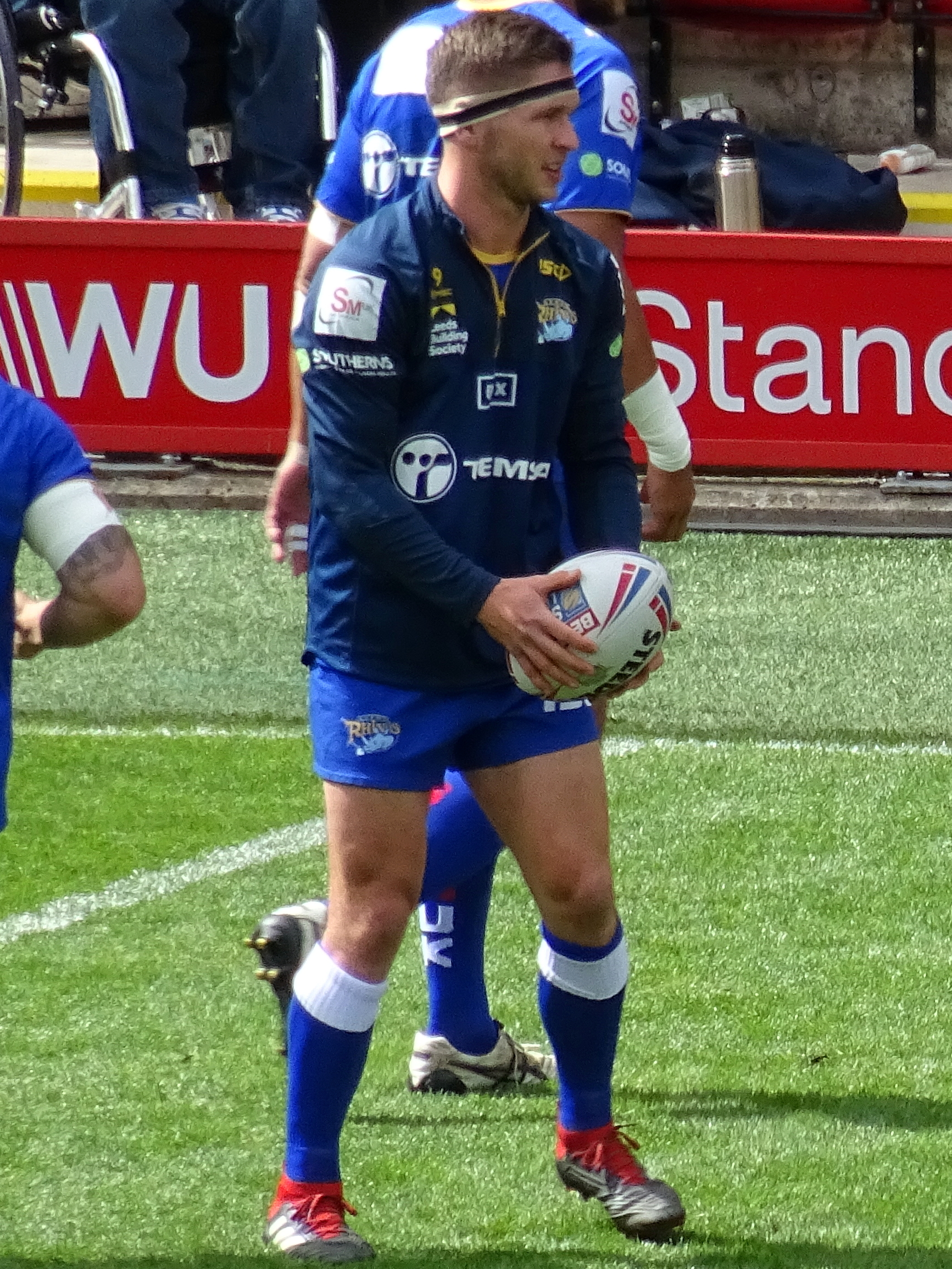

Personal information
- Full name: Matt Steven Parcell
- Born: 30 October 1992 (age 34) Ipswich, Queensland, Australia
- Height: 5 ft 11 in (1.81 m)
- Weight: 13 st 12 lb (88 kg)

Playing information
- Position: Hooker
Club
Years	Team	Pld	T	G	FG	P
2015	Brisbane Broncos	6	0	0	0	0
2016	Manly Sea Eagles	15	2	0	0	8
2017–19	Leeds Rhinos	80	32	0	0	128
2019(loan)	→ Hull Kingston Rovers	5	2	0	0	8
2020–24	Hull Kingston Rovers	116	32	0	0	116
	Total	222	68	0	0	260
Representative
Years	Team	Pld	T	G	FG	P
2015	Queensland Residents	1	1	0	0	4
- Source: As of 16 November 2026
- Relatives: Gary Parcell (grandfather)

Matt Steven Parcell (born 30 October 1992) is an Australian professional rugby league footballer who plays as a hooker for Western Clydesdales in the Queensland Cup.

He previously played for the Brisbane Broncos and Manly Warringah Sea Eagles in the NRL. Parcell has also played for the Leeds Rhinos in the Super League, and on loan from Leeds at Hull KR in 2019 before making the move permanent. He leaves Hull KR at the end of the 2024 season, announcing a move back to Australia.

== Background ==
Parcell was born in Ipswich, Queensland, Australia. He is the grandson of former Australian international Gary Parcell.

Parcell played his junior rugby league for the Fassifern Bombers, before being signed by the Ipswich Jets. He also attended Mutdapilly State School, and went to Ipswich Grammar School in his high school years.

== Playing career ==
=== 2015 ===
In 2015, Parcell joined the Brisbane Broncos. In the preseason, he beat former Bronco Jake Granville's 2.5-kilometre cross country record twice in one hour and then set a new mark for the Broncos' 1.8-kilometre run, while he can also run 40 metres in under five seconds. On 3 May, he played for the Queensland Residents against the New South Wales Residents. In Round 12 of the 2015 NRL season, he made his NRL debut for the Broncos against the Canberra Raiders. On 18 August, he signed a 3-year contract with the Manly Warringah Sea Eagles starting in 2016. After the NRL season Parcell won both the Queensland Cup and the NRL State Championship playing for the Ipswich Jets, scoring a try in both grand finals.

=== 2016 ===
Parcell's first competitive showing with the Sea Eagles was during the first day of the 2016 NRL Auckland Nines at Eden Park in New Zealand. He crossed for the winning try for Manly in their opening game against the Broncos, and later replicated the feat by scoring the winning try in their second game against the New Zealand Warriors. In December, he signed a 3-year contract with Super League side Leeds Rhinos, after being released from the final two years of his Sea Eagles contract.

=== 2017 ===
He played in the 2017 Super League Grand Final victory over the Castleford Tigers at Old Trafford.

=== 2019 ===
On 26 June 2019, Parcell joined fellow Super League side Hull Kingston Rovers on a deal until the end of the season. Just 24 hours after signing for the Hull Kingston Rovers, Parcell scored the winning try on his debut against cross-city rivals Hull F.C., the Hull Kingston Rovers won the match 18–10.

=== 2020 ===
On 15 October 2019, Hull Kingston Rovers turned the end of the season loan deal into a one-year contract.

=== 2021 ===
Parcell made 21 appearances for Hull Kingston Rovers in the 2021 Super League season as the club made it all the way to within one game of the grand final before losing to the Catalans Dragons.

=== 2022 ===
Parcell played a total of 25 games for Hull Kingston Rovers in the 2022 Super League season as the club finished 8th on the table and missed the playoffs.

=== 2023 ===
On 12 August 2023, Parcell played for Hull Kingston Rovers in their 17-16 golden point extra-time loss to Leigh in the Challenge Cup final. Parcell played 27 games for Hull Kingston Rovers in the 2023 Super League season as the club finished fourth on the table and qualified for the playoffs. He played in the club's semi-final loss against Wigan.

=== 2024 ===
In round 1 of the 2024 Super League season, Parcell was sent to the sin bin and also scored a try in Hull Kingston Rovers 22-0 victory over Hull FC. In round 7, Parcell scored a hat-trick in the club's 50-10 victory over the London Broncos. On 12 October, Parcell played in Hull Kingston Rovers 2024 Super League Grand Final loss against Wigan.

=== 2025 ===
On 13 November 2025 it was reported that he had come out of retirement to play for Western Clydesdales in the Queensland Cup in 2026.

== Statistics ==
Year	Team	Games	Tries	Pts
2015	Brisbane Broncos	6		
2016	Manly Warringah Sea Eagles	15	2	8
2017	Leeds Rhinos	34	19	76
2018	Leeds Rhinos	29	7	28
2019	Leeds Rhinos	17	6	24
2019	Hull Kingston Rovers (loan)	5	2	8
2020	Hull Kingston Rovers	11	5	20
2021	Hull Kingston Rovers	21	7	28
2022	Hull Kingston Rovers	25	7	28
2023	Hull Kingston Rovers	30	4	16
2024	Hull Kingston Rovers	18	7	28
	Totals	214	66	264

== Honours ==
- Super League (1): 2017
- Challenge Cup (1): Runner-Up 2023
