= Kevin McDonald (rugby league) =

Australian rugby league footballer

Personal information
- Born: 1936 Sydney, New South Wales, Australia
- Died: 12 April 2014 (age 78) Oyster Bay, New South Wales, Australia

Playing information
- Position: Fullback
Club
Years	Team	Pld	T	G	FG	P
1962–63	St. George	6	0	18	0	36

Kevin MacDonald (1936 – 12 April 2014) was an Australian rugby league footballer who played in the 1960s.

== Playing career ==
Kevin McDonald was graded by Saints in 1958, and played third grade and reserve grade until 1961. McDonald played as reserve first grade fullback for two seasons with the St George Dragons between 1962 and 1963 initially to replace first grade fullback Brian Graham, who had left the club due to business commitments overseas. By 1963, McDonald's place in first grade was taken in the team by Graeme Langlands, although in April 1963 McDonald played his 100th game for St. George Dragons in reserve grade and won another premiership with the Dragon's Reserve Grade team in 1963.

Kevin McDonald was a fantastic goal kicker, and scored over 550 points for the Dragons during his career. He retired in 1964.

Kevin McDonald won a premiership with the St. George Dragons, playing full-back in the 1962 Grand Final and he kicked 3 goals in that match.

He was later appointed coach of the St. George Third Grade for the 1967 season.
