= Gwyl Barnes =

Australian rugby league footballer, surf boat rider & businessman

Personal information
- Full name: Gwyl Barnes
- Born: 8 July 1940
- Died: 29 December 2000 (aged 60)

Playing information
- Position: Lock, Five-eighth
Club
Years	Team	Pld	T	G	FG	P
1964–68	Eastern Suburbs	43	2	32	0	70
- Source: As of 10 Jul 2021
- Relatives: Keith Barnes (cousin)

Gwyl Barnes (1940–2000) was an Australian professional rugby league footballer who played in the New South Wales Rugby League (NSWRL) in the years 1964–68.

Barnes who played for the Eastern Suburbs club played 41 matches in his career. Gwyl is the cousin of Keith Barnes.

Gwyl owned Illawarra's most successful furniture and design business, called Barnes Darling. The Business is now 79 years old and still run by his two sons Steen & Cade Barnes

Gwyl was a world champion surf boat rower.

He was born 1940 and died 2000.
