= Noel Kelly (rugby league) =

Australia international rugby league footballer and coach (1936–2020)

Noel Kelly OAM
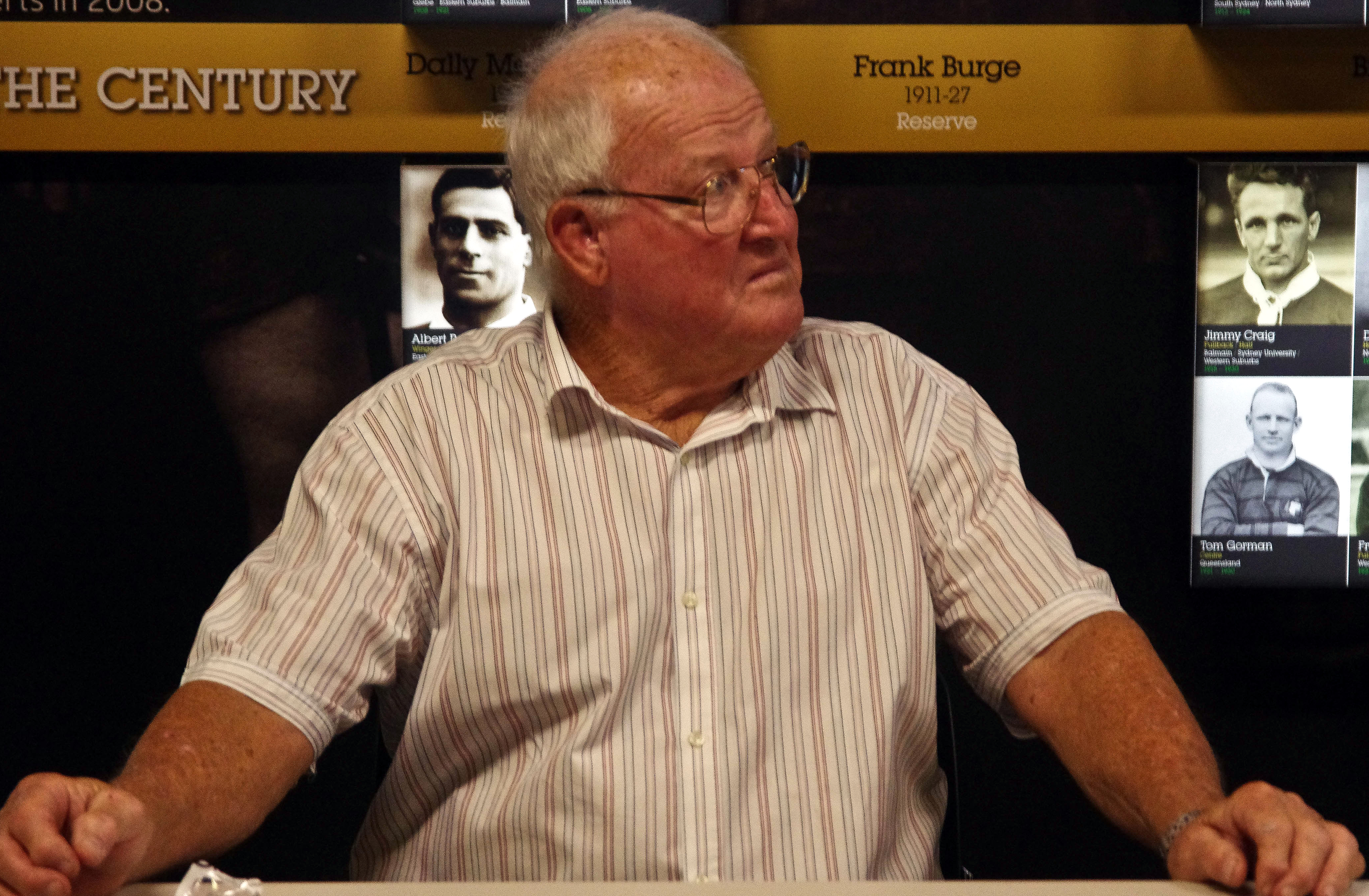

Personal information
- Full name: Noel Raymond Kelly
- Born: 22 January 1936 Ipswich, Queensland, Australia
- Died: 14 June 2020 (aged 84) Sydney, New South Wales, Australia

Playing information
- Height: 5 ft 11 in (180 cm)
- Weight: 14 st 0 lb (89 kg)
- Position: Hooker, Prop, Lock
Club
Years	Team	Pld	T	G	FG	P
1958–59	Brothers (Ipswich)
1960	Ayr
1961–69	Western Suburbs	111	6	0	0	18
1970	Wollongong
	Total	111	6	0	0	18
Representative
Years	Team	Pld	T	G	FG	P
1959–60	Queensland	8	1	0	0	3
1959–68	Australia	25	2	0	0	6
1963–67	New South Wales	6	1	0	0	3

Coaching information
Club
Years	Team	Gms	W	D	L	W%
1966–69	Western Suburbs	85	43	2	40	51
1970	Wollongong
1973–76	North Sydney	88	33	4	51	38
	Total	173	76	6	91	44
Representative
Years	Team	Gms	W	D	L	W%
1966	New South Wales	3	3	0	0	100

Noel Raymond Kelly OAM (22 January 1936 – 14 June 2020) was an Australian professional rugby league footballer and coach, who played at club, state and national levels. He was named among the country's finest footballers of the 20th century. Kelly played as a hooker, prop forward or lock for much of his top-grade career with the Western Suburbs Magpies, whom he played for in three consecutive NSWRFL grand finals from 1961 to 1963. Kelly was named at hooker of the Western Suburbs Magpies, Queensland and Australian teams of the 20th century.

== Early life ==
Kelly was born at Ipswich Hospital and brought up in Goodna. He attended primary school at St Mary's in Goodna, and the Christian Brothers high school, St Edmund's College, Ipswich, where he said he was "frequently belted or bashed or caned" by the Brothers. At age 12, his mother allowed him to enrol in the local state school, where he studied until he was 14. Goodna's first team played in the local district reserve grade competition, and Kelly played for the club from his junior league until he was in the first team as a young man, mostly playing as a lock or second rower.

== Playing career ==
=== 1950s ===
In 1956, Kelly began playing in the Ipswich Rugby League competition, first with Railways, and then, two years later, with Brothers. At Railways he played on the same side as Gary Parcell and Dud Beattie. At Brothers he was coached by Dan Dempsey, who had played on two Kangaroo tours.

The Bulimba Cup was a tri-series played between sides representing Ipswich, Brisbane and Toowoomba. Playing at hooker, Kelly played in the Ipswich side which defeated the Toowoomba Downsmen 15–10 in the 1958 final, in front of a crowd of 7,242. Kelly said the repeated success in 1959 was his "spring board to state and international level".

Kelly was chosen to play for Queensland in 1959 under captain-coach Clive Churchill. In an era when success in scrums was crucial, Kelly won the count in his debut 20–9 against the New South Wales hooker. He missed the second game of the series, but returned to see Queensland win the series 2–1.

In 1959, Kelly played in the Queensland victory over New South Wales that attracted 35,261 spectators, smashing Brisbane's previous record for an interstate match of 22,817.

Kelly was picked as hooker for his first test match against New Zealand. Later that year he embarked on his first Kangaroo Tour, but pre-existing injuries to his knees hampered his performances on the tour and he played in only 14 of a possible 37 games, allowing St George player Ian Walsh to cement the spot as starting hooker.

=== 1960–1965 ===
Short of money, Kelly signed an £800 contract to captain-coach with Ayr for the 1960 season. Upon his arrival, he discovered the five local clubs had pooled their resources to afford the signing, and he was expected to rotate through all five clubs. He would captain-coach a club for a week, and then move on to the next.

Chosen for the 1960 World Cup, Kelly scored his first international try in Australia's opening game against France. Playing at hooker, it was said that he, "was bruised and scratched from his ankles to his hips from kicks which everyone besides the referee could see going in."

Kelly had established himself as a Kangaroo representative before he moved to Sydney in 1961. Initially linked to Souths, he eventually chose Western Suburbs because they offered better accommodation, and, "two big prop forwards", which he insisted was "something I must have". The club initially delayed paying the transfer fee to North Queensland side, Ayr, while Kelly spent eight weeks recovering from a cartilage operation. With Ian Walsh the chosen test hooker, Kelly played in no internationals in 1961 or 1962. Before the start of the 1963 season, he asked the Magpies for a trial at prop, as it was thought he, "wrecked his chances in representative sides with the large number of penalties he incurred as hooker". In June, he returned to the Australian team, taking the place of captain Billy Wilson, who had been dropped for the third match of the series against New Zealand. Making his international debut at prop, he scored a try. He played prop in the first game of the two match series against South Africa, but returned to hooker in the second, replacing Walsh who was sidelined with a broken nose.

Kelly was a stalwart of the Magpies sides of the 1960s and played in all of the club's consecutive Grand Final losses to St. George in 1961, 1962 and 1963. Kelly has said that he believes referee Darcy Lawler had accepted money to help St George win the 1963 Grand Final.

Not a large player by the standards of the time, Kelly had the reputation as an aggressive forward. He was sent off eleven times while playing for Wests, though some send-offs were for scrum breaches rather than foul play. On at least one occasion it appeared he was the wrong person sent off.

In August 1963, Kelly announced he was unable to undertake the Kangaroo tour due to take place due to financial commitments. He said, "It's a bitter disappointment, and if there was any way I could make the tour, I certainly would." He also withdrew from the interstate match that was due to take place the next day. Three days later, Kelly signed a new contract with the Magpies and revised his position. Kelly made his second Kangaroo Tour, playing at prop forward as captain Ian Walsh was again chosen as hooker. In his third Kangaroo Tour he was back at hooker.

=== 1966–1969 ===
Missing the first game of the 1966 interstate season after suffering a broken thumb and serving a suspension, Kelly had not taken the field for over a month when he was named captain-coach of NSW for the second game. When told of his selection, a "dumbfounded" Kelly said, "You must be kidding. I have been training. I am fit. I just can't believe it." Kelly was captain-coach of the Magpies from 1966, a position he held for 4 years.

Kelly injured himself in the first game of the 1967 season with Wests, and a 10 May news report said he was still suffering from blurred vision and no chance of playing in 10 June test match against New Zealand. Weeks later, having played just one game after returning from injury, Kelly was a "shock choice" for the match. The oldest player in the team, his inclusion was, "a compliment to his great experience and his durability." In the second match, Kelly was sent off after less than two minutes into the game. After his five-eighth John Gleeson was felled, Kelly retaliated by punching culprit Robert Orchard in the head.

Kelly was the first hooker/prop to be selected for three Kangaroo tours: 1959–60, 1963–64 and 1967–68. In the first tour match in 67, against Warrington, he had his nose broken in the first scrum of the match. For the first test, it was said, "Kelly, the most important player in Australia's test line up, is agony today with his injured back", but still played in the match. After losing the first test, Australia won the second. The decider was won 11–3 by Australia, with, "the one sour note" of the match being "the dismissal of veteran hooker Noel Kelly only three minutes from the end" after a stiff arm tackle on opposition half Tommy Bishop. Facing suspension for the tackle, Kelly was allowed to play in the test against France a week later, while waiting for official notification from the English Rugby League to arrive in the mail. The third in the series was Kelly's 28th and last test.

Kelly's last game was at the end of the 1969 season, with his team winning their fifth game straight, in a "mire" at Penrith. After leaving Wests, he received a number of inquiries, including one from Canterbury. "One minute I am happily retired, the next I have more offers than ever in my career," a "perplexed" Kelly said. He eventually signed a two-year, $5000 per season contract to join Wollongong from 1970 but only remained for one season, a period he later said he regretted.

=== Post-playing ===
Kelly returned to Sydney to coach the North Sydney Bears from 1973 to 1976, never making the semi-finals. At the end of 1976, having retired from coaching with Norths, he was named to coach a Sydney team in a tour of New Zealand.

He became a board member and an ambassador for the Men of League Foundation.

In September 2004 Kelly was named as captain and hooker of the Western Suburbs Magpies team of the century. In February 2008, he was named in the list of Australia's 100 Greatest Players (1908–2007) which was commissioned by the Australian Rugby League and the National Rugby League to celebrate the code's centenary year in Australia. Kelly went on to be named as hooker in Australian rugby league's Team of the Century. Announced on 17 April 2008, the team is the panel's majority choice for each of the thirteen starting positions and four interchange players. In June 2008, he was chosen in the Queensland Rugby League's Team of the Century at hooker.

The yearly award for the best forward at the Wests Tigers club is named the Noel Kelly Medal in his honour.

In the 2018 Queen's Birthday Honours, Kelly was awarded the Medal of the Order of Australia (OAM) for services to rugby league.

Kelly died on 14 June 2020 in Sydney. He was 84, and had suffered a heart attack–induced stroke on 16 May, one month before his death.
