= Marcel Bescos =

France international rugby league player

Personal information
- Born: 28 June 1937 Oloron-Sainte-Marie, Basses-Pyrénées, France
- Died: 17 July 2013 (aged 76) Castres, France

Playing information
- Height: 1.80 m (5 ft 11 in)
- Weight: 102 kg (16 st 1 lb)
- Position: Prop
Club
Years	Team	Pld	T	G	FG	P
19??–63	Albi
1963–66	Limoux
	Total	0	0	0	0	0
Representative
Years	Team	Pld	T	G	FG	P
1959–66	France	20	1	0	0	3

Marcel Bescos (Oloron-Sainte-Marie, 28 June 1937- Castres, 17 July 2013) is a former French rugby league player who played as prop. He was French Champion with Albi in 1962, as well as captain of the French national team.

== Career ==
Having an impressive physique, 102 kg, Marcel Bescos essentially played most of his career for Albi before joining Limoux at the end of his career. He formed an impressive first row alongside André Vadon and Honoré Conti, he became French Champion for Albi in 1962. When playing for France, he also made great sporting performances. When he became captain of the national team, he was part of the French squad which put Australia in check in January 1960 for a match which ended on a 8–8 tie, after the match, Johnny Raper and Reg Gasnier admitted that they never met such a strong, fast and technical prop. With Bescos, the French team won against Great Britain six times. After his sporting career, he became an antiquarian and a salesman at Établissements Mauriès. He died of pulmonary embolism on 17 July 2013.

== Personal life ==
Outside his playing career, he worked as a fishmonger.

== Honours ==
- French Rugby League Championship
  - Winner in 1962 (Albi)
  - Runner-up in 1960 (Albi)
