= Keith Barnes =

Welsh-Australian rugby league footballer (1934–2024)

Keith Barnes AM
Personal information
- Full name: William Keith Barnes
- Born: 30 October 1934 Port Talbot, Wales, United Kingdom
- Died: 7 April 2024 (aged 89) (Note: Barnes' death was announced on 8 April 2024. Most sources are unclear as to his date of death. The Daily Telegraph reported that Barnes had "died on Sunday night" [7 April 2024].) Randwick, New South Wales, Australia

Playing information
- Height: 5 ft 10 in (178 cm)
- Weight: 11 st 10 lb (74 kg)
- Position: Fullback
Club
Years	Team	Pld	T	G	FG	P
1953–54	Wollongong
1955–68	Balmain	194	11	742	1	1519
	Total	194	11	742	1	1519
Representative
Years	Team	Pld	T	G	FG	P
1956–63	New South Wales	12	2	54	0	114
1957–58	NSW City Firsts	2	0	16	0	32
1957–66	Australia	17	0	54	0	108

Coaching information
Club
Years	Team	Gms	W	D	L	W%
1967–68	Balmain	45	27	2	16	60
1983	Balmain	1	1	0	0	100
	Total	46	28	2	16	61
Representative
Years	Team	Gms	W	D	L	W%
1960	Australia	4	3	0	1	75
- Relatives: Gwyl Barnes (cousin)
Medals
Men's rugby league
Representing Australia
Rugby League World Cup
Gold medal – first place	1957 Australia	Team
Silver medal – second place	1960 United Kingdom	Team

William Keith Barnes AM (30 October 1934 – 7 April 2024), also known by the nickname of "Golden Boots", was a Welsh-born Australian rugby league footballer who played in the 1950s and 1960s, and coached in the 1960s, 1970s and 1980s. He was a fullback for the Australian national team and for the Balmain Tigers. He played in 14 tests between 1959 and 1966, as national captain on 12 occasions. He was known as "Golden Boots" due to his exceptional goal-kicking ability. After his playing days he became a referee and later co-commentated on the Amco Cup on Network Ten with Ray Warren in the 1970s. He is considered one of the nation's finest footballers of the 20th century.

== Background ==
Barnes was born in Port Talbot, Wales on 30 October 1934.

== Early years ==
Barnes was 15 when his family emigrated to Australia in 1950 to Wollongong where Barnes learnt the game at Wollongong High School. He was graded by the Wollongong club at age 19 as a half-back and in 1954 represented for Country and in a Southern Districts side against the touring Great Britain Lions.

== Club career ==
In 1955 he was signed by Norm "Latchem" Robinson to join the Balmain Tigers and moved to the district and straight into first grade, never playing a single lower grade game in the following 14 seasons. The following year he played in the first of three Grand Finals against the St George Dragons at the beginning of their long premiership reign. On three occasions 1956, 1964 and 1966 Keith Barnes would experience defeat in a premiership decider – the last two as captain.

Barnes quickly became known for his deadly accurate goal-kicking and would often kick penalties from the further side of the 50-yard line. He once kicked eleven goals in a club match.

In 1966 he overtook Ron Willey's record for the most points scored in an NSWRFL career (1,288); Barnes' eventual total of 1,519 stood as the new career record for seven seasons until it was bettered by Eric Simms in 1973. Barnes' tally of 1,519 points for Balmain placed him (as of 2017) 19th on the all-time list of club pointscorers.

In his final playing year with Balmain in 1967, Barnes was captain-coach. He returned briefly for some match appearances in 1968 when the club's playing roster was depleted by injury.

== Representative career ==
Barnes made his debut for New South Wales in 1956. His international debut was in the 1957 World Cup. He broke his cheekbone in the opening match of the series but stayed on field to kick five goals.

Barnes made his test debut against New Zealand in Brisbane in the second test of the 1959 trans-Tasman series enjoying the rare distinction of captaining his country in his first Test appearance. He kicked seven goals in that outing and stayed on as fullback, goal kicker and captain for the third test. He was then selected as captain for the 1959 Kangaroo tour and played as captain in all six Test matches and sixteen minor tour matches, kicking 101 goals on the tour. At the tail-end of the trip he appeared in two promotional games against Italy.

In 1960, Barnes led Australia in all three tests of a domestic series against France. He enjoys the record of six career test appearances against France, all as captain, for four wins, 1 draw and a loss. In the Brisbane second test 55–6 victory Barnes kicked a test record of 10 goals. He was then selected as captain-coach of the 1960 World Cup squad played in England. He appeared in Australia's second and third matches of the tournament with his representative rival Brian Carlson doing the goal-kicking.

Barnes returned to national honours in the second test of the 1962 domestic series against Great Britain, his final test as captain. Thereafter Australian selectors enjoyed a surfeit of talented young fullbacks to choose from and Ken Thornett and Les Johns were regularly selected until Graeme Langlands later became the incumbent. In 1966 however Barnes made two final representative appearances in the first and second tests of the domestic Ashes series. He scored all of Australia's points in the second test victory. Injury saw Les Johns take Barnes' spot for the third and he would not regain it.

== Post playing ==
Barnes retired from competitive rugby league in 1968 having made seventeen appearances for his adopted country and 234 appearances for the Tigers in which he averaged four goals per game. After three unsuccessful Grand Final outings during his time, the Tigers ironically won their first premiership in twenty-one years in Barnes' first year after retirement – 1969.

Barnes continued an active role in rugby league and in 1976 became Secretary-Manager of the Balmain Leagues Club and in 1984 took up the role of Chief Executive of the football club. Barnes was the first ex-Kangaroo captain to manage the Australian side on the 1990 Kangaroo tour. At the turn of the century Barnes was honoured with selection in the Balmain's 'Team of the Century' and in the Wests Tigers' 'Team of the Century'. The yearly award for the best back at the Wests Tigers club is named the Keith Barnes Medal in his honour.

In 2007 he was inducted into the Australian Rugby League Hall of Fame. In February 2008, Barnes was named in the list of Australia's 100 Greatest Players (1908–2007) which was commissioned by the NRL and ARL to celebrate the code's centenary year in Australia.

In the 1996 Australia Day Honours, he was appointed a Member of the Order of Australia (AM) in "recognition of service to rugby league as a player and administrator". On 24 October 2000, he was awarded the Australian Sports Medal for his rugby league achievements.

In 2009 Barnes was honoured with the naming of the Keith Barnes Stand at Leichhardt Oval, the Balmain Tigers' home ground. He died on 7 April 2024, at the age of 89.

== Representative matches played ==
Team	Matches	Years	Points
New South Wales	12	1959–1963	114
Australia (tests)	14	1957–1966	108
Australia (World Cup)	3	1957&1960	10

== Sources ==
- Whiticker, Alan (2004) Captaining the Kangaroos, New Holland, Sydney
- Andrews, Malcolm (2006) The ABC of Rugby League Austn Broadcasting Corpn, Sydney
- Alan Whiticker & Glen Hudson (2007). The Encyclopedia of Rugby League Players. Wetherill Park, New South Wales: Gary Allen Pty Ltd. pp. 21–22. ISBN 978-1-877082-93-1.

== Notes ==
Sporting positions
Preceded by Clive Churchill; 1959–1960	Coach Australia; 1960	Succeeded by Brian Carlson; 1961
Preceded by Brian Carlson	Captain Australia; 1959–1962	Succeeded by Barry Muir
Preceded by Ron Willey; 1962	Record-holder; Most points in an NSWRFL career 1966 (1,289) – 1973 (1,519)	Succeeded by Eric Simms; 1973
