= Dud Beattie =

Australia international rugby league footballer

Personal information
- Full name: Dudley R Beattie
- Born: 27 April 1934 Queensland, Australia
- Died: 19 April 2016 (aged 81) Caloundra, Queensland, Australia

Playing information
- Height: 6 ft 1 in (185 cm)
- Weight: 14 st 8 lb (93 kg)
- Position: Prop
Club
| Years | Team | Pld | T | G | FG | P |
|---|---|---|---|---|---|---|
| | Railways (Ipswich) |
Representative
| Years | Team | Pld | T | G | FG | P |
| | Ipswich |
| 1958–62 | Queensland | 19 | 2 | 0 | 0 | 6 |
| 1959–62 | Australia | 15 | 1 | 0 | 0 | 3 |

Dud Beattie (27 April 1934 – 19 April 2016) was an Australian rugby league footballer who played in the 1950s and 1960s. An Australian international and Queensland representative prop forward, he played in Ipswich, Queensland for the Railways club.

== Career ==
Beattie along with Noel Kelly and Gary Parcell, helped Ipswich dominate the Bulimba Cup and all three were selected for the Australian national side's front row. In 1959 he played in the Queensland victory over New South Wales that attracted 35,261 spectators, smashing Brisbane's previous record for an interstate match of 22,817. Also that year Beattie was selected to make his international debut for Australia, becoming Kangaroo No. 338. He went on the 1959–60 Kangaroo tour of Great Britain and France, represented Australia at the 1960 World Cup, and went on the 1961 Kangaroo tour of New Zealand.

Beattie's last international was played during the 1962 Great Britain Lions tour of Australia where he appeared in all three Tests. In the third Test at Sydney in July 1962 he dislocated his shoulder and played on knowing there were no substitutes allowed. When he eventually needed to leave the field, Beattie provoked Derek Turner into a fight, referee Darcy Lawler sent both men off and the opposing numbers remained even. Australia went on to snatch an 18–17 win. He retired with thirteen Test caps and two World Cup appearances.

Beattie later worked as a selector during the 1980s for the Australian national team and for the Ipswich Jets on the coaching and administration staff.

== Sources ==
- Andrews, Malcolm (2006) The ABC of Rugby League Austn Broadcasting Corpn, Sydney
