= Johnny Riley =

Personal information
- Full name: Johnny Edward Riley
- Born: 22 June 1939 (age 86) Sydney, New South Wales, Australia

Playing information
- Position: Centre
Club
Years	Team	Pld	T	G	FG	P
1959–64	St. George	61	22	0	0	66
Representative
Years	Team	Pld	T	G	FG	P
1959	New South Wales	1	0	0	0	0
1959–60	Australia	1	0	0	0	0
1959	NSW City	1	1	0	0	3

Johnny Riley (born 22 June 1939) is an Australian former professional rugby league footballer who played in the 1950s and 1960s.

== Playing career ==
Riley was a St. George Junior player, and came into grade in 1959, and played alongside the great Reg Gasnier in the centres on many occasions during his career.

Riley played with the St George Dragons for six seasons in first grade between 1959 and 1964. After a stellar start to his career, he was chosen to represent New South Wales in 1959 and also played one test for Australia against England in the first test on the 1959-60 Kangaroo Tour. He is listed on the Australian Players Register as Kangaroo No.349. He won a premiership with St George Dragons, playing center in the winning side that won the 1962 Grand Final.

He moved to Victoria in 1965 and played rugby league for the local Moorabbin, Victoria club. Riley attended the Reg Gasnier testimonial at Kogarah Oval on 5 July 2014.
