= Bill Delamere =

Australian rugby league footballer

Personal information
- Full name: William Alexander Delamere
- Born: 20 April 1935; Sydney, New South Wales, Australia
- Died: 16 February 2023 (aged 87)

Playing information
- Position: Prop
Club
Years	Team	Pld	T	G	FG	P
1957–64	Manly-Warringah	41	6	0	0	18
Representative
Years	Team	Pld	T	G	FG	P
1960	Australia	2	1	0	0	3
1959–60	New South Wales	3	0	0	0	0
- Source: As of 3 April 2019

Bill Delamere (20 April 1935 – 16 February 2023) was an Australian professional rugby league footballer who played in the 1950s and 1960s. He played for Manly-Warringah in the New South Wales Rugby League (NSWRL) competition, for the New South Wales representative team and toured England, France and Italy with the 1959-60 Kangaroos Australian team.

== Background ==
Delamere played junior rugby league for Newport before being graded by Manly.

== Playing career ==
Delamere made his first grade debut for Manly-Warringah in 1957. Delamere played in one of Manly's finals games against St George as they were defeated 21–7. Manly would go on to reach their second grand final against St. George. Delamere was not selected to play in the match as St George outclassed Manly to win 31–9. In 1958, Manly made the finals again but failed to reach the grand final.

In 1959, Manly reached their third grand final and once again the opponents were St George. Delamere played at prop in the grand final as St George kept Manly scoreless winning their 4th straight premiership 20–0. Delamere also received his first representative call up in 1959 being chosen to play for New South Wales.

In 1959-60 Delamere was selected to tour England, France and Italy with the Australian Kangaroos team and played in several games against club teams on that tour and two games against the Italian national team. Delamere retired at the end of the 1964 season.
