= Jim Cody =

Australian rugby league footballer (1943–2022)

- Cody in 2012

Personal information
- Born: 28 June 1943; Strathfield South, New South Wales, Australia
- Died: 28 November 2022 (aged 79); Sydney, New South Wales, Australia

Playing information
- Position: Second-row, Lock
Club
| Years | Team | Pld | T | G | FG | P |
|---|---|---|---|---|---|---|
| 1962–73 | Western Suburbs | 159 | 9 | 0 | 0 | 27 |

Jim Cody (28 June 1943 – 28 November 2022) was an Australian professional rugby league footballer who played in the 1960s and 1970s. He played for Western Suburbs as a second rower and as a lock forward.

Cody died on 28 November 2022, aged 79.

== Early life ==
Cody played junior rugby league for South Strathfield and then the Enfield Federals before being signed by Western Suburbs.

== Playing career ==
Cody made his first grade debut for Wests against Newtown in 1962 at Henson Park. In the same year, Cody played in the 1962 NSWRL grand final against St George. During the first half, Cody knocked out St George player Norm Provan with a heavy tackle. In the second half, Saints player Billy Wilson who at half time declared he wanted to get even with Cody, hit the player with a high tackle and was sent off early in the second half. Despite being a man down, St George held on to win the premiership 9-6. The following year, Cody was left out of the 1963 grand final squad which played and lost to St George again, this would be the last grand final Western Suburbs would play in before exiting the competition in 1999. Cody stayed loyal to Wests over the next nine seasons and retired at the end of 1973.
