= Georges Fages =

Former France international rugby league footballer

Personal information
- Born: 24 February 1934 Albi, Tarn, Occitania, France
- Died: 8 June 2000 (aged 66) Albi, France

Playing information
- Height: 5 ft 8 in (1.73 m)
- Weight: 13 st 0 lb (83 kg)
- Position: halfback, loose forward
Club
Years	Team	Pld	T	G	FG	P
1950–66	Albi
1966–68	Cavaillon XIII
1968–??	Albi
	Total	0	0	0	0	0
Representative
Years	Team	Pld	T	G	FG	P
1959–64	France	18	1	0	0	3

Coaching information
Representative
Years	Team	Gms	W	D	L	W%
1968–??	Albi
- Source: As of 12 February 2021

Georges Fages (24 February 1934 – 8 June 2000) was a French rugby league footballer and coach in the 1950s and 1960s.

He spent most of his sporting career with the Albi club, with which he won the French Championship three times in 1956, 1958 and 1962.

Thanks to his club level performances, he had 18 caps for the French national team between 1959 and 1964, taking part at the 1960 Rugby League World Cup.

== Biography ==
Outside the pitch, he worked as shopkeeper.

== Honours ==
- Team honours :
  - French Champion : 1956, 1958 et 1962 (Albi).
  - Runner-up at the French Championship : 1960 (Albi).
