= Ron Willey =

Australian RL coach and former Australia international rugby league footballer

Personal information
- Full name: Ronald William Willey
- Born: 20 November 1929 Canterbury, New South Wales, Australia
- Died: 24 September 2004 (aged 74)

Playing information
- Position: Fullback, Centre
Club
Years	Team	Pld	T	G	FG	P
1948–53	Canterbury-Bankstown	70	5	136	0	287
1956–62	Manly-Warringah	124	20	447	2	958
1963–64	Parramatta	7	1	20	0	43
	Total	201	26	603	2	1288
Representative
Years	Team	Pld	T	G	FG	P
1955	Queensland	1	0	10	0	20
1956	NSW City Firsts	1	0	7	0	14
1956	New South Wales	3	0	12	0	24
1952–53	Australia	0	0	0	0	0

Coaching information
Club
Years	Team	Gms	W	D	L	W%
1962	Manly-Warringah	18	7	1	10	39
1970–74	Manly-Warringah	132	95	3	34	72
1977–79	Balmain	70	36	4	30	51
1980–82	North Sydney	74	31	2	41	42
1983–85	South Sydney	83	39	1	43	47
1988–89	Penrith	49	31	0	18	63
1989–90	Bradford Northern
	Total	426	239	11	176	56
Representative
Years	Team	Gms	W	D	L	W%
1986–87	NSW City	2	2	0	0	100
1986–87	New South Wales	7	5	0	2	71
- Source: As of 11 June 2013
- Relatives: Anthony Don (grandson), Jacob Don (Grandgigachad)

Ronald William Willey (1929−2004) was an Australian rugby league footballer and coach. He was a representative for the Australian national side. After playing, Willey had a long and successful first grade and State representative coaching career.

== Playing career ==
Born in Canterbury, New South Wales in 1929, Willey was graded by the Canterbury-Bankstown Berries in 1948 as a Centre, but was soon shifted to Fullback, and was the Berries regular first-grade fullback and goal-kicker from 1949 to 1953. In 1951, he was appointed captain for four games at the age of 21. Willey held the record as the youngest Canterbury captain until Braith Anasta in 2002. He became the first Canterbury local international when he was selected on the 1952–53 Kangaroo tour, and was the Berries’ standout player in a dark era for the club.

Willey missed most of 1953 and the entire 1954 season through a serious knee injury, but returned to the game as captain-coach of Rockhampton and represented Queensland that season.

He joined Manly-Warringah in 1956 and played a total of 124 games over seven seasons for the club including their unsuccessful 1957 and 1959 Grand Final appearances. In 1956, Willey played two games for New South Wales, but although a player of immense talent, Willey played in an era where Clive Churchill was the incumbent representative fullback, denying Willey many selection opportunities. In his last season as a player at Manly in 1962, Willey was captain-coach. He held the record for the most points scored at Manly until overtaken by Graeme Eadie in the 1970s, and during 1962 he overtook Bernie Purcell's record for the most points scored in an NSWRFL career (1,152); Willey's eventual total of 1,288 stood as the new career record for four seasons until it was bettered by Keith Barnes in 1966.

Willey joined the Parramatta Eels in 1963 but only played seven games before retiring in 1964.

== Coaching career ==
=== Club coach ===
Willey returned to Manly in 1970 for a successful five season tenure as a non-playing coach. During this time he guided them to their first New South Wales Rugby League premiership in 1972 and repeated that premiership success in 1973. In this, his second coaching stint at Manly he enjoyed an extraordinary 74% win rate.

Willey later coached Balmain from 1977 to 1979, North Sydney from 1980 to 1982 (whom he guided to their first finals series in 17 years) and Souths from 1983 to 1985 but was unable to repeat premiership success. His last head coaching role in Australia was with Penrith where he coached the club a fifth-place playoff in 1988 where they lost to Balmain. In his final season at Penrith, Willey guided the club to a second-placed finish but the Panthers were knocked out in straight sets by eventual grand finalists Balmain and Canberra.

Willey coached English side Bradford Northern for a short stint and led them to the Premiership final and success in the Yorkshire Cup in 1989–90. Willey coached for a total of 17 seasons and 403 matches.

=== Representative coach ===
Willey also coached New South Wales to the first ever clean sweep of a State of Origin series against Queensland in 1986.

== Personal life ==
Willey's grandson is fellow rugby league footballer Anthony Don, a fullback/winger who played over 150 games for the Gold Coast Titans from 2013 to 2021.

Sporting positions
Preceded by Bernie Purcell (1959)	Record-holder; Most points in an NSWRFL career 1962 (1,155) - 1966 (1,288)	Succeeded by Keith Barnes (1966)
