= Brian Hambly =

Australian RL coach & footballer (1937–2008)

Personal information
- Full name: Brian Clinton Hambly
- Born: 31 October 1937 Sydney, New South Wales, Australia
- Died: 30 August 2008 (aged 70) Drummoyne, New South Wales, Australia

Playing information
- Position: Prop, Second-row
Club
| Years | Team | Pld | T | G | FG | P |
|---|---|---|---|---|---|---|
| 1956–58 | South Sydney | 33 | 7 | 0 | 0 | 21 |
| 1959–60 | Wagga Magpies |
| 1961–67 | Parramatta | 105 | 6 | 46 | 0 | 110 |
| | Total | 138 | 13 | 46 | 0 | 131 |
Representative
| Years | Team | Pld | T | G | FG | P |
| 1959–64 | New South Wales | 11 | 1 | 0 | 0 | 3 |
| 1959–65 | Australia | 18 | 2 | 2 | 0 | 10 |
| 1959 | NSW Country | 1 | 1 | 0 | 0 | 3 |
| 1964 | NSW City | 1 | 0 | 1 | 0 | 2 |

Coaching information
Club
| Years | Team | Gms | W | D | L | W% |
| 1967 | Parramatta Eels | 22 | 8 | 0 | 14 | 36 |
- Relatives: Gary Hambly (nephew)

Brian Clinton Hambly (31 October 1937 – 30 August 2008) was an Australian rugby league player, a representative forward for the Australia national team between 1959 and 1965. His club career was played with South Sydney and Parramatta. He was considered one of the Australia's finest rugby league players of the twentieth century.

== Club career ==
=== Souths and Wagga ===
A South Sydney junior from the Mascot club, Hambly played in Souths' Presidents Cup side in 1955. He was graded by the Rabbitohs in 1956 and played three seasons with the club. He represented in a New South Wales Colts side against Great Britain in 1958. In 1959 aged only 21 he took on a captain-coach role in the country town of Wagga Wagga, New South Wales for two seasons and it was from there as a country player that he made his state and national representative debuts that same season.

=== Parramatta ===
In 1961 he was lured to the Parramatta club on the then record transfer fee of 2,500 pounds.

The Parramatta club had languished at the bottom of the ladder in their first fifteen seasons after admission to the top grade competition in 1947 – they finished last eight times in the ten seasons from 1952 to 1961. With St. George champion Ken Kearney appointed coach, 1962 marked a turnaround: internationals Hambly and Ron Lynch had joined the club in 1961 with Bob Bugden and Ken Thornett following in 1962. The club was particularly competitive from 1962 to 1965 making the finals in all four seasons. Hambly, then at the top of his career, gave great service to the club at that time. He played on till 1967 in which season he was named captain-coach, however suffering the effects of knee injury during the year he sacked himself in favour of young future Eel star Bob O'Reilly.

== Representative career ==
Hambly first appeared on the representative scene in 1958 for New South Wales Colts against Great Britain playing alongside future greats in Johnny Raper and Ian Walsh. From his country position at Wagga he was first selected for New South Wales at the senior level in 1959 and played in the New South Wales loss to Queensland that attracted 35,261 spectators, smashing Brisbane's previous record for an interstate match of 22,817.

He was then picked as a reserve for Australia's test series against New Zealand that year and then for the 1959 Kangaroo tour. Hambly played in all six Tests plus in 16 other minor tour matches. Hambly was the preferred lock in the first two Ashes tests of the 1959-60 Kangaroo tour but the great form of Johnny Raper saw Hambly moved to the second-row for the remainder of this test career.

He toured to Britain again the next year for the 1960 World Cup and made a second Kangaroo tour in 1963-64 where he played in five tests and nineteen tour matches. Hambly injured a calf muscle doing private training and missed Australia's 50–12 win at Swinton which secured the Ashes.

Hambly made a further overseas tour of New Zealand in 1965. In all, Hambly played in eight different Test series, appearing against all of the major rugby league playing nations; Great Britain (five times), France (nine times) and New Zealand (four times).

== Career playing statistics ==
| Team | Matches | Years |
|---|---|---|
| South Sydney | 33 | 1956–1958 |
| Parramatta | 105 | 1961–1967 |
| New South Wales | 11 | 1959–1964 |
| Australia (Tests) | 18 | 1959–1965 |

== Post playing and Accolades ==
Hambly was the licensee of the Willoughby Hotel on Sydney's North Shore from 1975 to 1979.

In February 2008, Hambly was named in the list of Australia's 100 Greatest Players (1908–2007) which was commissioned by the NRL and ARL to celebrate the code's centenary year in Australia.

In 2005, Hambly was inducted into Parramatta's hall of fame.

Hambly died on 30 August 2008, aged 71.

== Sources ==
- Whiticker, Alan & Hudson, Glen (2006) The Encyclopedia of Rugby League Players, Gavin Allen Publishing, Sydney
- Andrews, Malcolm (2006) The ABC of Rugby League Austn Broadcasting Corpn, Sydney
- Pollard, Jack (ed) Gregory's Guide to Rugby League (1965), Grenville Publishing Sydney
