= Harry Wells (rugby league) =

Australia international rugby league footballer

Personal information
- Full name: Harry James Wells
- Born: 8 May 1932 (age 94) Wollongong, New South Wales, Australia

Playing information
- Height: 5 ft 10 in (178 cm)
- Weight: 14 st 6 lb (92 kg)
- Position: Centre
Club
Years	Team	Pld	T	G	FG	P
1950	Wollongong
1951	South Sydney	6	3	0	0	9
1952–55	Wollongong
1956–61	Western Suburbs	86	33	0	0	99
1966	Goulburn Workers
1967–68	Young
1969	Longreach
1970–72	Port Macquarie
	Total	92	36	0	0	108
Representative
Years	Team	Pld	T	G	FG	P
1952–61	New South Wales	35	6	0	0	18
1952–60	Australia	37	13	0	0	39
1952–55	NSW Country	4	1	0	0	3
1957–60	NSW City	3	2	0	0	6

Harry James Wells (born 8 May 1932) is an Australian former representative rugby league footballer who played in the 1950s, 1960s and 1970s. A centre whose club career was played along the New South Wales coast as well as in Sydney with the South Sydney Rabbitohs and the Western Suburbs Magpies, he has since been named among the nation's best players of the 20th century.

== Club career ==
Born Harry Wills, Wells came from a long line of boxers, with both his father and grandfather fighting under the name "Dealer" Wills. Wells came to Sydney from Wollongong, New South Wales to join South Sydney in 1951. He won a premiership with the club in his debut year, playing on the wing in the 1951 Grand final victory over Manly.

He then returned home for a number of seasons in Wollongong from where he made his national and state representative debuts.

He returned to the Sydney premiership in 1956 with the Western Suburbs Magpies when that club earned their tag as "the Millionaires" in buying up a talent roster including Arthur Summons, Dick Poole and Ian Moir in their pursuit of an elusive premiership title. He captained the Magpies in their 1958 Grand final loss to St.George. He played a further three seasons with Wests and rekindled his representative career at this time.

Wells then played out the remainder of his career with a number of seasons in the country – at Goulburn, Young and Longreach. He made a final representative appearance against Great Britain in 1966 representing for the Monaro region. He finally retired in 1972, aged 40, after three seasons in Port Macquarie.

== Representative career ==
Wells first represented for New South Wales in 1952 and toured with the Kangaroos that same year playing in two Tests and twelve minor matches.

He played against New Zealand in 1953 and 1959; Great Britain in 1954 and 1958; and France in 1955 and 1960. He was selected and played in three World Cup campaigns in 1954, 1957 and 1960. He made a second Kangaroo tour in 1959–60 playing in all six Tests and seventeen tour matches, scoring eleven tour tries.

In the latter part of his career he formed a great centre partnership with the young Reg Gasnier and they paired together in 12 Tests. All up Wells made 21 Test appearances.

== Accolades ==
In 2000 Harry Wells was awarded the Australian Sports Medal for his contribution to Australia's international standing in rugby league. The following year he received the Centenary Medal, also for services to sport. In September 2004 he was named at centre in the Western Suburbs Magpies team of the century. In 2007 Wells was inducted into the Australian Rugby League Hall of Fame. Also that year he was selected by a panel of experts at centre in an Australian 'Team of the 50s'.

In February 2008, Wells was named in the list of Australia's 100 Greatest Players (1908–2007) which was commissioned by the NRL and ARL to celebrate the code's centenary year in Australia.

On 21 July 2011, Wells was named at centre in the Illawarra Rugby League Team of the Century, as the league was celebrating its centenary in this year.

In October 2016, he was inducted as an Athlete Member in the Sport Australia Hall of Fame.

== Personal life ==
Harry Wells married Yvonne Palmer. He has three children: Jennifer, Coralie and Stewart.

== Sources ==
- Andrews, Malcolm (2006) The ABC of Rugby League Austn Broadcasting Corpn, Sydney
- Whiticker, Alan & Hudson, Glen (2006) The Encyclopedia of Rugby League Players, Gavin Allen Publishing, Sydney
