= Robert Eramouspé =

France international rugby league footballer (1935–2020)

Personal information
- Full name: Robert Jacques Eramouspé
- Born: 8 September 1935 Saint-Jean-de-Luz, Pyrénées-Atlantiques, Nouvelle-Aquitaine, France
- Died: 29 May 2020 (aged 84) Marignane, France

Playing information
- Height: 5 ft 10 in (1.78 m)
- Weight: 13 st 0 lb (83 kg)
- Position: second-row
Club
Years	Team	Pld	T	G	FG	P
	Côte Basque
	Roanne
	Marseille
	Total	0	0	0	0	0
Representative
Years	Team	Pld	T	G	FG	P
1959–64	France	26				3

Robert Eramouspé, (Saint-Jean-de-Luz, 8 September 1935 - Marignane, 29 May 2020), was a French rugby league player in the 1950s, 1960s and 1970s.

He played for several clubs, starting with Côte Basque before its folding, later Roanne with a French Championship title in 1960 and a Lord Derby Cup title in 1962, and Marseille with two new Lord Derby Cup titles in 1965 and 1971.

Thanks to his club performances, he was called up several times to represent France between 1959 and 1964 and took part at the 1960 Rugby League World Cup.

== Biography ==
After the first years at Côte Basque, the club was forced to declare bankruptcy, thus freeing the players before the 1957–58 season. Eramouspe then later joined Roanne.

== Honours ==
- Collectif :
  - Winner of the French Championship : 1960 (Roanne).
  - Winner of the Lord Derby Cup : 1962 (Roanne), 1965 and 1971 (Marseille).
  - Runner-up at French Championship : 1961 (Roanne).
