= Darrel Chapman =

Australia international rugby league footballer (1937–1992)

Personal information
- Full name: Darrel Barrie Chapman
- Born: 11 September 1937 Kempsey, New South Wales, Australia
- Died: 9 October 1992 (aged 55) Lismore, New South Wales, Australia

Playing information
- Position: Fullback, utility back
Club
Years	Team	Pld	T	G	FG	P
1960–64	South Sydney	61	10	0	0	30
Representative
Years	Team	Pld	T	G	FG	P
1960	Australia	1	1	0	0	3
1959	New South Wales	1	1	0	0	3

Darrel Barrie Chapman (11 September 1937 - 9 October 1992) was an Australian rugby league footballer who played in the 1950s and 1960s.

== Playing career ==
Originally from Kempsey, New South Wales, Chapman attended St John's College, Woodlawn, outside Lismore in northern New South Wales. He was picked to play for New South Wales in 1959 and was subsequently selected for the 1959-60 Kangaroo Tour of Britain, France and Italy as a fullback. Chapman played 18 tour games and one Test for Australia in 1960. In 1960 he moved to South Sydney, playing five seasons between 1960-1964 and often captaining the Bunnies between 1961 and 1964. He is listed on the Australian Players Register as Kangaroo No. 352.

== Post playing ==
After his playing career he moved into coaching and administration with the NSWRFL, and later sports medicine with the Lismore campus of Southern Cross University.

== Death ==
Chapman died of cancer on 9 October 1992, aged 55. An annual charity event, the Darrel Chapman Fun Run, is held in Lismore to raise money for children's medicine.
