= Billy Wilson (Australian rugby league) =

Australian RL coach and former Australia international rugby league footballer

Personal information
- Full name: William Alfred Wilson
- Born: 30 May 1927 Blakehurst, New South Wales, Australia
- Died: 25 March 1993 (aged 65) Gympie, Queensland, Australia

Playing information
- Position: Prop
Club
Years	Team	Pld	T	G	FG	P
1948–49	St. George	14	2	0	0	6
1950	Picton
1951	Baridine
1952–56	St. George	67	6	1	1	20
1957	Wagga
1958–62	St. George	90	9	0	0	27
1963–67	North Sydney	65	3	0	0	9
	Total	236	20	1	1	62
Representative
Years	Team	Pld	T	G	FG	P
1960–63	New South Wales	6	2	0	0	6
1959–63	Australia	12	0	0	0	0
1957	NSW Country	1	0	0	0	0
1959–63	NSW City	2	0	0	0	0

Coaching information
Club
Years	Team	Gms	W	D	L	W%
1967	North Sydney	22	8	1	13	36
- As of 16 January 2024

William Alfred Wilson (30 May 1927 – 25 March 1993) was an Australian professional rugby league footballer who played in the 1940s, 1950s and 1960s. An Australia national and New South Wales state representative front-row forward, he captained the national team in two Tests against New Zealand in 1963 and captained-coached several of his club sides during a record length top-grade career over twenty seasons from 1948 to 1967. Much of his New South Wales Rugby League premiership career was spent with Sydney's St. George club where he was a pivotal member for the first half of that club's 11-year consecutive premiership run from 1956. Billy Wilson won six consecutive premierships with the Dragons between 1956 and 1962.

== Early career ==
Wilson was a St. George junior, growing up in Blakehurst in Sydney. He was graded for the St. George Dragons in 1948 as a centre/lock. Regularly during his early career Wilson would take up the financial opportunities offered to captain/coach country first division sides. In 1950 he and his wife Norma moved to Picton for that purpose from where he represented for Southern Division against the touring 1950 Great Britain side. In 1951, he was captain-coach at Baradine's club in northern New South Wales.

== Playing career ==
=== St. George Dragons ===
He returned to St George in 1952 cementing a regular first grade position from 1953 and he soon earned a reputation as a rugged enforcer and fierce protector of his teammates. In the final decider of 1953 against South Sydney, he was sent-off by referee Darcy Lawler for fighting with South's Martin Gallagher. In 1954, he featured in the Dragon's semi-final win against North Sydney playing out the match with a broken arm, gashed eye and three broken ribs.

He was instrumental in the 1956 Grand Final where the Dragons commenced their long run of victories. St George centre Merv Lees cracked his collar bone early in that match and Wilson moved out from the pack to play in the centres in spite of being constrained himself with a knee injury. Wilson tormented his Balmain Tigers opposition three-quarters in both attack and defence and set up both his own wingers for a number of long dashes. He was later selected by his teammates as man of the match.

He captain-coached Wagga in the Riverina competition in 1957 then returned to the St. George Dragons for five more premiership victories from 1958 to 1962.

Wilson made his state debut for New South Wales in 1959 aged 32 against a touring New Zealand side and then debuted for Australia in the first Test against that same side. He went on to play in all three Tests of that series and was then selected on the 1959 Kangaroo tour where he played in 5 Tests and 14 minor tour matches. Wilson is listed on the Australian Players Register as Kangaroo No. 345.

The 1962 NSWRFL season's Grand Final was Wilson's last for St. George, his sixth Grand Final victory and his role became infamous. Dragons captain Norm Provan was knocked out by Wests Jim Cody five minutes before half time. Cody escaped any official punishment but Provan was carried from the field and didn't return again until well into the second half. Wilson came out as captain after the break and after having told his players to keep things calm he squared things up in the first seconds after kick-off before the first tackle was even made. The order of proceedings was unclear, but Cody went down and referee Jack Bradley sent Wilson off. With no replacements allowed in those days, St George were reduced to 11 men until Provan returned to the field 15 minutes later. From an interview with Wilson's wife Norma conducted in 1994, Larry Writer reports that Wilson felt enormously guilty about putting the team in this position and promptly retired after the match. Larry Writer himself suggests that the send-off may have soured Wilson's relationship with club officials in spite of the victory. These views aside, at 35 years of age, the clubs saw the end of Wilson's playing career to be looming and his contract was not renewed. As of the 2007 NRL season no forward since Wilson has been sent off in a Grand Final and in that game Wilson became the only man to have been sent off in two Grand Finals following his dismissal in 1953.

=== North Sydney Bears ===
In the twilight of his career aged 36 in 1963, with his new club, North Sydney Bears showing sparkling early-season form, Wilson was selected as captain for New South Wales in the interstate series against Queensland and then was honoured with the national captaincy for the domestic Test series of 1963 against New Zealand following injury to Arthur Summons. He set the record for being the oldest Australian Test captain (36 years and 23 days). After five seasons with the North Sydney Bears, Bluey Wilson retired in 1967, age 40, having set the record for longest Australian first grade career of any player (20 seasons).

== Personal life ==
An electrician by trade, Wilson contracted at the Kurnell Oil Refinery while it was being built from 1952 to 1965 and was promoted to electrical supervisor. He then contracted as an electrician housing construction in the St George district before joining St George Appliances as a sales representative of ovens and ranges. From 1978, he and his family were in hotels, owning pubs at Oberon, Nambucca Heads and then Gympie.

He was the publican and licensee at the Freemason's Hotel in Gympie, Queensland at the time of his death in 1993 of a cerebral haemorrhage following a stroke. On his death Billy & Norma had been married 43 years to the day. They had two sons – Brad and Steve (who played third grade for St. George) and a daughter, Yvonne who followed Billy into the hotel business.

== Accolades ==
On 20 July 2022, Wilson was named in the St. George Dragons District Rugby League Clubs team of the century.

== Bibliography ==
- Whiticker, Alan (2004) Captaining the Kangaroos, New Holland, Sydney
- Writer, Larry (1995) Never Before, Never Again, Pan MacMillan, Sydney (ISBN 9780732908164)
- Whiticker, Alan & Hudson, Glen (1995) The Encyclopedia of Rugby League Players, Gavin Allen Publishing, Sydney (ISBN 1875169571)

Sporting positions
Preceded by Fred Griffiths; 1963–1966	Coach North Sydney; 1967	Succeeded by Colin Greenwood; 1968
Preceded by Arthur Summons	Captain Australia; 1963	Succeeded by Ian Walsh
