= Eddie Lumsden (rugby league) =

Australian rugby league footballer and administrator (1936–2019)

Personal information
- Full name: Edmund Lumsden
- Born: 28 September 1936; Kurri Kurri, New South Wales
- Died: 6 October 2019 (aged 83); East Maitland, New South Wales

Playing information
- Position: Wing
Club
Years	Team	Pld	T	G	FG	P
19??–55	Kurri Kurri
1955	Manly-Warringah	4	1	0	0	3
1957–66	St George	158	136	17	0	442
	Total	162	137	17	0	445
Representative
Years	Team	Pld	T	G	FG	P
1957–63	New South Wales	19	14	7	0	56
1959–63	Australia	15	4	0	0	12
- Relatives: Jack Lumsden (brother)

Edmund Lumsden (28 September 1936 – 6 October 2019) was an Australian professional rugby league footballer. He was a wing with the St. George Dragons during their eleven-year premiership winning run from 1956 to 1966, playing in and winning nine grand finals. Lumsden is one of four brothers who all played for Country. Jack Lumsden played for Manly and Australia. Eddie Lumsden's twin, Richie, and his other brother, Ray, were both "bush footballers".

== Playing career ==
Lumsden moved from Kurri Kurri in 1955 to play with Sydney's Manly-Warringah club. After four games he was ruled ineligible on the grounds he didn't reside in the area.

In 1956 Lumsden represented Country seconds and while playing for Country he was seen by the St. George Dragons. He was offered £300 and a job with the MWS&DB.

In his debut Sydney season with the St. George Dragons in 1957, he represented both Sydney firsts and New South Wales.

He was the competition's leading try scorer in 1958 (18 tries) and 1962 (21 tries). He was the second post-war player after Ian Moir to score a century of tries. He gained selection in the Australia national team, becoming Kangaroo No. 346. On the 1959–60 Kangaroo tour he played in all six Tests and 21 minor tour matches scoring 25 tries in total, topping both the try-scoring list and tally for most matches played by an Australian on the tour. Becoming a regular selection for Australia, he played international matches against France's national team in 1961; Great Britain in the 1962 Ashes series; New Zealand's national team in 1963; with his last Test appearance against South Africa in 1963. He reached this milestone in his 100th game during the 1963 season.

He retired from the game after the Dragons' eleventh consecutive premiership in 1966.

Eddie Lumsden won nine premierships with the St. George Dragons during his 10-year career at the club and is remembered as one of the greatest wingers of his era. He played 158 games with the club and scored 136 tries.

== Post-playing ==
After working as a wine merchant Lumsden enjoyed business success managing, then buying and selling hotels. He was awarded Life Membership of the St. George Dragons in 1969. Lumsden became a rugby league selector in 1977 for Country and NSW, spending 23 years in the position, and 14 years as an Australian selector. Lumsden died on 6 October 2019 at the age of 83.

== Accolades ==
In February 2008, Lumsden was named in the list of Australia's 100 Greatest Players (1908–2007) which was commissioned by the NRL and ARL to celebrate the code's centenary year in Australia.

In 2010 he was named on the wing in Kurri Rugby League Club's team of the century. On 20 July 2022, Lumsden was named in the St. George Dragons District Rugby League Clubs team of the century.

== Footnotes ==
- Writer, Larry (1995) Never Before, Never Again, Pan MacMillan, Sydney
- Whiticker, Alan; Hudson, Glen (2007). The Encyclopedia of Rugby League Players. Wetherill Park, New South Wales: Gary Allen Pty Ltd. p. 609. ISBN 978-1-877082-93-1.
- Andrews, Malcolm (2006) The ABC of Rugby League Austn Broadcasting Corpn, Sydney
- Tony Adams. "Legend Q&A". Rugby League Week (11 July 2007). Sydney, NSW: PBLMedia: 22–23.
