= Ron Boden =

Australia international rugby league footballer and coach

Personal information
- Full name: Ronald James Boden
- Born: 16 October 1936 Coonamble, New South Wales, Australia
- Died: 24 August 2015 (aged 78) Wyong, New South Wales, Australia

Playing information
- Position: Centre
Club
Years	Team	Pld	T	G	FG	P
1960–63	Parramatta	39	9	0	0	27
Representative
Years	Team	Pld	T	G	FG	P
1960	Australia	3	0	0	0	0
1960	New South Wales	3	0	0	0	0
1958–59	Queensland	4	2	0	0	6

Coaching information
Club
Years	Team	Gms	W	D	L	W%
1961	Parramatta	18	3	0	15	17
- Source: As of 26 February 2019

Ronald James Boden (16 October 1936 – 24 August 2015) was an Australian rugby league footballer who played in the 1950s and 1960s. He played for Parramatta as a centre and also played for Australia, New South Wales and Queensland.

== Early life ==
Born on 16 October 1936 in Coonamble, New South Wales, Boden grew up there before moving to Toowoomba in Queensland and played in the local competition after being spotted by coach former North Sydney player Duncan Thompson.

== Playing career ==
Boden was selected to play for Queensland in 1958 and 1959 while living there to compete against New South Wales in the interstate series.

=== Parramatta ===
In 1960, Boden moved to Sydney and joined Parramatta. In Boden's first season at the club, Parramatta finished last on the table and claimed the wooden spoon. Despite the club's position on the ladder, Boden was selected to play for Australia in 1960 and New South Wales. In 1961, Boden became captain-coach of the Parramatta side but they once again finished last on the table. Boden spent a further two seasons at Parramatta before retiring at the end of 1963. In retirement, Boden continued to be involved with the club for many years.

=== Canowindra ===
In late 1964 Boden signed a contract with the Group 11 Canowindra Rugby League Club to become playing coach for first and reserve grade sides. He remained with the club until the end of the 1967 season. Boden normally played for Canowindra in the as Five-eighth.

== Personal life ==
He was married to Marie and the couple had four daughters and a son.

He died near Wyong on 24 August 2015, 53 days before his 79th birthday.
