= Jim Paterson (rugby league) =

Australia international rugby league player (1934–2019)

Personal information
- Born: 30 August 1934 Townsville, Queensland, Australia
- Died: 15 May 2019 (aged 84) Townsville, Queensland, Australia

Playing information
- Position: Forward
Club
Years	Team	Pld	T	G	FG	P
1953	South Townsville
1954	Rockhampton
195?–5?	Valleys (Toowoomba)
1958–59	South Townsville
1960–62	Innisfail
1963	Herbert River
1964–66	Centrals (Townsville)
	Total	0	0	0	0	0
Representative
Years	Team	Pld	T	G	FG	P
1953–66	Townsville
1954–66	North Queensland
1955–57	Toowoomba
1958–66	Queensland	24
1959–61	Australia	8	0	0	0	0

Jim Paterson (30 August 1934 – 15 May 2019) was an Australian rugby league footballer who played in the 1950s and 1960s. An Australian international and Queensland interstate representative forward, he played club football throughout the state of Queensland during his career. He retired with the record for most games for North Queensland, having captained the side to victories over Great Britain and France.

== Biography ==
Paterson was born in Townsville on 30 August 1934. He attended South Townsville State School and became a South Townsville rugby league club junior.

=== Playing career ===
Paterson made his first appearance for the South Townsville club's senior team in 1953. He represented Townsville in the Foley Shield competition. Whilst playing for Rockhampton in 1954 Paterson first represented North Queensland. Paterson moved to Toowoomba club Valleys where he was coached by former Kangaroo forward Herb Steinohrt. During this time he represented Toowoomba for two seasons.

After returning to Townsville in 1958 to captain-coach Souths, Paterson again played for North Queensland and was first selected for the Queensland Maroons, playing against arch-rivals New South Wales. The following year, he helped the Maroons to win the interstate series against New South Wales for the first time. Paterson was then selected for the Australian national team, becoming Kangaroo No. 343. and playing in all three Test matches in the series against New Zealand. At the end of the year he was selected to go on the 1959-60 Kangaroo tour of Great Britain and France. He played two Tests against France.

In 1960 Paterson joined Innisfail, who he captain-coached to victory in the Foley Shield and Paterson played for North Queensland, Queensland and Australia. The Test in Sydney against France featured five Queenslanders in the forward pack. The following year Paterson toured New Zealand with the Australian team, playing in both Tests against the Kiwis. This was after the Queensland team, of which he was now a fixture, retained the interstate crown against New South Wales. Paterson spent a third year in Innisfail but, instead of playing with all the clubs, he joined the Babinda Colts as coach. In 1963 the Herbert River coaching position lured Paterson to Ingham. Once again he represented North Queensland, including the match against New Zealand, and again went on to play for Queensland against the Blues. He returned to Townsville to coach Centrals and the Foley Shield team in 1964, taking his team to the Shield final. Paterson continued to play for North Queensland and Queensland until 1966 when he was again a member of Townsville's Foley Shield final team before retiring.

=== Post playing ===
In 2008, Australian rugby league's centenary year, Paterson was named at second-row forward in a Queensland Rugby League Northern Division 'Team of the Century'.
