= Barry Muir =

Australian rugby league footballer and coach (1937–2022)

Personal information
- Full name: Barry Atkins Muir
- Born: 18 September 1937 Murwillumbah, New South Wales, Australia
- Died: 2 September 2022 (aged 84) Tweed Heads, New South Wales, Australia

Playing information
- Height: 173 cm (5 ft 8 in)
- Weight: 68 kg (10 st 10 lb)
- Position: Halfback
Club
Years	Team	Pld	T	G	FG	P
1956	Tweed Heads Seagulls
1957	Valleys (Toowoomba)
1958–68	Western Suburbs
1970	Ayr
1971	Tweed Heads Seagulls
	Total	0	0	0	0	0
Representative
Years	Team	Pld	T	G	FG	P
1959–66	Queensland	28	3	2	0	13
1959–64	Australia	25	3	0	0	9

Coaching information
Club
Years	Team	Gms	W	D	L	W%
1966–68	Western Suburbs	63	21	4	38	33
1973–76	Redcliffe	92	50	0	42	54
1983	Northern Suburbs	14	4	0	10	29
	Total	169	75	4	90	44
Representative
Years	Team	Gms	W	D	L	W%
1974–78	Queensland

Barry Muir (18 September 1937 – 2 September 2022) was an Australian professional rugby league footballer and coach. An Australian and Queensland representative halfback, he played in 22 Tests between 1959 and 1964, as captain on two occasions.

== Early life ==
Born in Murwillumbah, New South Wales, Muir grew up at Tweed Heads. Muir was educated and played junior rugby league at Coolangatta State School and represented Queensland Schoolboys in 1951. He would leave school at age 15 to take up a carpentry apprenticeship. He was also a promising junior cricketer, occasional boxer, and coxswain for the Tweed Rowing Club.

== Club career ==
Nicknamed "Garbo", Muir was a feisty halfback, he was graded with the Tweed Heads Seagulls, making his first grade debut in 1956. He played a season in 1957 with Valleys in Toowoomba before joining Western Suburbs in 1958 in the Brisbane Rugby League. He stayed with the club for 11 seasons.

He was captain-coach of Western Suburbs from 1966 to 1968. In 1968 he was banned from Brisbane football for allegedly spitting at the referee.

Muir continued playing in 1970 as captain-coach with Ayr in North Queensland, before finished his playing career as captain-coach in 1971 back at Tweed Heads, where his career had begun 15 seasons earlier.

== Representative career ==
He debuted for Queensland against a visiting New Zealand team in 1959 and was selected in the Australia national rugby league team for the same series. He also played in the Queensland victory over New South Wales that attracted 35,261 spectators, smashing Brisbane's previous record for an interstate match of 22,817. Muir then made his Test debut on 13 June 1959 at the Sydney Cricket Ground along with Reg Gasnier, Johnny Raper and Noel Kelly and played in all three Tests against the Kiwis. Later that year was selected for the 1959-60 Kangaroo tour where he appeared in all six Tests and 14 minor Tour matches.

He was vice-captain of the Australian squad for the 1960 World Cup and played in all three Australian appearances. He first captained Australia in the opening match of that World Cup against France when Keith Barnes was out injured.

After captaining Queensland in 1961 in the interstate series he was selected in a 1961 tour of New Zealand and captained Australia in the Second Test of that series in Auckland to a 20–8 victory. For the next two years he formed a regular test halves partnership with Five-eighth Arthur Summons in a domestic Ashes series against Great Britain and Tests against visiting New Zealand and South African sides.

In 1963 he made his second Kangaroo tour and replicated his feat of four years prior in appearing in all six Tests and 14 minor Tour matches. He was abruptly sent-off by referee Eric Clay in the Third Test at Headingley, Leeds for a reckless kick directed towards his opposite number Tommy Smales when the ball came out of a scrum on the Great Britain side. After he was sent off, he picked up a bucket of water on the sidelines and tipped it over an abusive spectator. It was to be his last Test appearance.

Team	Matches	Years
Queensland	28	1959–1966
Australia (Tests)	22	1959–1964
Australia (World Cup)	3	1960

== Coaching career ==
Following his retirement as a player, Muir was brought to the Redcliffe Dolphins as coach in 1973. Muir would lead Redcliffe to the 1973 Brisbane Rugby League Grand Final, with the Dolphins losing to Fortitude Valley 15–7. Muir would coach Redcliffe for three seasons.

Muir coached the Queensland side from 1974 to 1978 (two years prior to the adoption of Origin selection criteria) and during this time Muir coined the term "cockroaches", the derogatory descriptor of the New South Wales rugby league team still used by the Queenslanders. Before the final match of the 1976 interstate series he was watching a replay of an old game in the Queensland team's hotel when he spotted a cockroach.

"There was one of those rabbit ear aerials on top of the TV with this cockroach sitting on it. Tt was on the NSW side. Then when the Blues changed sides at halftime, it did too. I thought, that's what they are, bloody cockroaches." The next day at training Muir told his players to go out and belt those cockroaches. A Sydney reporter overheard and the nickname stuck.

— The Courier-Mail, 30 June 2012

In the 1980s, he would later coach Queensland Country, Combined Brisbane, and Norths Devils.

== Legacy ==
Muir was a long time outspoken critic of the system that allowed the best Queensland club players to move to the Sydney competition and then to represent New South Wales. This widely held sentiment eventually led to the birth of the Rugby League State of Origin concept.

In February 2008, Muir was named in the list of Australia's 100 Greatest Players (1908–2007) which was commissioned by the NRL and ARL to celebrate the code's centenary year in Australia.

In August 2022, Muir was named as halfback in the Brisbane Rugby League Team of the Century.

== Death ==
After a long battle with ill-health, Muir died peacefully at his home on 2 September 2022. He was survived by his wife and four children.

== Sources ==
- Whiticker, Alan (2004) Captaining the Kangaroos, New Holland, Sydney
- Andrews, Malcolm (2006) The ABC of Rugby League Australian Broadcasting Corporation, Sydney

Sporting positions
Preceded by Keith Barnes	Captain Australia; 1960-1961	Succeeded by Reg Gasnier
