= Elton Rasmussen =

Australia international rugby league footballer

Personal information
- Full name: Elton William Rasmussen
- Born: 27 July 1936; Maryborough, Queensland
- Died: 28 November 1978 (aged 42); Toowoomba, Queensland

Playing information
- Position: Prop, Second-row
Club
Years	Team	Pld	T	G	FG	P
	All Whites
1962–68	St. George	126	21	49	0	161
1969	Souths (Brisbane)
	Total	126	21	49	0	161
Representative
Years	Team	Pld	T	G	FG	P
1959–61, 1969	Queensland	13	0	3	0	6
1962–68	New South Wales	7	0	0	0	0
1959–68	Australia	15	0	0	0	0

Elton Rasmussen (1936–1978) was an Australian professional rugby league footballer who played in the 1950s and 1960s. He was a second-row with the St. George Dragons during the second half of their 11-year consecutive premiership winning run from 1956 to 1966. He was a representative in the Australian national team from 1959 to 1962 and from 1967 to 1968.

== Career ==
Rasmussen was playing for Toowoomba when first selected for Queensland in 1959. That year he played in the Queensland victory over New South Wales that attracted 35,261 spectators, smashing Brisbane's previous record for an interstate match of 22,817. He was then picked on the 1959-60 Kangaroo tour and made his Test debut in that Ashes series against Great Britain. He played in two Tests and fifteen minor matches on tour. Later in 1960 he played in all three Tests of the domestic series against France.

Rasmussen relocated to New South Wales and joined St George in 1962. He played 122 games for St George till 1968 and played in five successive winning Grand finals from 1962 to 1966, the first at lock and the rest in the second-row. He represented again for Australia in 1962 against Great Britain, made a second Kangaroo tour in 1967 playing in all six Tests and twelve minor touring matches. His final national appearances were in the 1968 World Cup where he appeared in one pool match and in Australia's victory in the final over France. Rasmussen captain-coached Brisbane Souths in 1969 and again earned Queensland representative honours in that year.

== Death ==
Rasmussen died suddenly in 1978 from a heart attack at Greenmount near Toowoomba, Queensland aged 42.

== Accolades ==
In 2008, rugby league in Australia's centenary year, Rasmussen was named at lock forward in the Toowoomba and South West Team of the Century.
