= Ian Walsh (rugby league) =

Australian RL coach & footballer (1933–2013)

Personal information
- Born: 20 March 1933 Bogan Gate, New South Wales, Australia
- Died: 4 April 2013 (aged 80) Forbes, New South Wales, Australia

Playing information
- Position: Hooker
Club
Years	Team	Pld	T	G	FG	P
1950–51	Condobolin
1952–53	Parkes
1954–55	Forbes
1956–61	Eugowra
1962–67	St George	94	4	0	0	12
	Total	94	4	0	0	12
Representative
Years	Team	Pld	T	G	FG	P
1951	Western Districts	1	0	0	0	0
1958–61	Country Firsts	1	0	0	0	0
1962–66	City Firsts	4	0	0	0	0
1959–66	New South Wales	4	0	0	0	0
1959–66	Australia	25	2	1	0	8

Coaching information
Club
Years	Team	Gms	W	D	L	W%
1966–67	St George	44	31	11	2	70
1971–72	Parramatta	45	16	2	27	36
	Total	89	47	13	29	53
Representative
Years	Team	Gms	W	D	L	W%
1965–66	City Firsts	2	2	0	0	100
1965	New South Wales	1	1	0	0	100
1965–66	Australia	5	3	0	2	60
- Source: As of 10 January 2016

Ian John Walsh (20 March 1933 – 4 April 2013) was an Australian professional rugby league footballer and coach. He was a hooker with the St. George Dragons from 1962 to 1967 and played in the last five of the Dragons' historic 11 consecutive premiership winning teams. He captained St. George in the last of its 11 successive Grand Final wins in 1966 and led The Saints again when their premiership winning streak ended in 1967. He was a representative for Australia and captained them in 10 Test matches from 1963 to 1966.

== Biography ==
Born on 20 March 1933 in Bogan Gate near Parkes in western New South Wales, Walsh played in country sides at Parkes, Forbes and Eugowra. He was selected to represent the Western Division when they hosted the 1951 French touring side and lost. It was as a country representative that his international début was against New Zealand in 1959, and later that year was selected for the 1959-60 Kangaroo tour. He played in all six Tests and in 17 minor tour matches.

=== St. George Dragons ===
Walsh joined St. George Dragons in 1962 and played ninety-six games till 1967, playing in four winning Grand Finals (1962, 1963, 1965 and 1966). His first Test as captain was on the 1963 Tour of Great Britain which saw the Kangaroos become the first Australian touring team in 50 years to win the Ashes. He was captain for the "Swinton Massacre" 2nd test of that tour when the Kangaroos registered the biggest win in Anglo-Australian test history, 50–12. After the retirement of Norm Provan in 1965, Walsh took on the role of St. George's captain-coach. In 1966 he achieved a rare distinction becoming the only player to captain-coach Australia to an Ashes series victory and his club to a premiership. He played a total of twenty-five tests for Australia from 1959 to 1966. The Dragons' star players were growing old, the young and brutal South Sydney Rabbitohs were looming as title contenders and the inevitable end to the run had to be approaching. Nevertheless, Walsh was able to lead the Dragons against the Balmain Tigers to their 11th straight victory and the end of their run.

=== Post playing and accolades ===
After retiring as a player Walsh coached the Parramatta Eels to the semi-finals of the 1971 NSWRFL season before becoming a successful columnist with the Daily Telegraph for over 20 years and a Country and State selector. He worked in sales in the printing industry in Sydney.

In February 2008, Walsh was named in the list of Australia's 100 Greatest Players (1908–2007) which was commissioned by the NRL and ARL to celebrate the code's centenary year in Australia.

Walsh died on 4 April 2013 at the age of 80 after a long illness 14 days after his 80th birthday. On 20 July 2022, Walsh was named in the St. George Dragons District Rugby League Clubs team of the century.

== Footnotes ==
Sporting positions
Preceded by Billy Wilson	Captain Australia; 1963-1966	Succeeded by Peter Gallagher
