= 2008 Anzac Test =

2008 Bundaberg Rum Centenary Test
| Australia | New Zealand |
|---|---|
| 28 | 12 |
| | 1 | 2 | Total |
|---|---|---|---|
| AUS | 22 | 6 | 28 |
| NZL | 0 | 12 | 12 |
- Date: 9 May 2008
- Stadium: Sydney Cricket Ground
- Location: Sydney, New South Wales, Australia
- Man of the Match: Cameron Smith
- Referee: Ashley Klein (Australia)
- Attendance: 34,571

Broadcast partners
- Broadcasters: Nine Network (AUS) Sky Sport (NZ)
- Commentators: Ray Warren; Phil Gould; Peter Sterling

The 2008 ANZAC test, also known as the Centenary Test as it commemorated the 100th anniversary of the first test match between the two countries, was a rugby league test match played between Australia and New Zealand at the Sydney Cricket Ground on 9 May 2008. Commemorating the first trans-Tasman Test match, which was also played at Sydney on the same day in 1908, it was the 9th Anzac test played between the two nations since the first was played under the Super League banner in 1997. This was the first test played at the SCG since Australia had defeated New Zealand 29-12 in 1986 and the first ever rugby league test played under lights at the ground.

For the game, the Kangaroos played in replica jumpers that were used until the first Green and Gold jumpers appeared in 1928. On this night the Kangaroos jumpers were Sky Blue and Maroon hoops depicting the states of New South Wales and Queensland. It was the first time the Kangaroos had worn their alternate test jumpers in a test match since their two test series against South Africa in 1963.

This was the 112th test between Australia and New Zealand since 1908.

== Teams ==
| Australia | Position | New Zealand |
|---|---|---|
| Billy Slater | Fullback | Brent Webb |
| Greg Inglis | Wing | Jason Nightingale |
| Mark Gasnier | Centre | Setaimata Sa |
| Justin Hodges | Centre | Iosia Soliola |
| Israel Folau | Wing | Sam Perrett |
| Greg Bird | Five-eighth | Lance Hohaia |
| Johnathan Thurston | Halfback | Thomas Leuluai |
| Brent Kite | Prop | Roy Asotasi (c) |
| Cameron Smith (c) | Hooker | Issac Luke |
| Petero Civoniceva | Prop | Nathan Cayless |
| Paul Gallen | 2nd Row | Sonny Bill Williams |
| Ryan Hoffman | 2nd Row | Simon Mannering |
| Michael Crocker | Lock | David Fa'alogo |
| Kurt Gidley | Interchange | Jeremy Smith |
| Willie Mason | Interchange | Dene Halatau |
| Anthony Tupou | Interchange | Adam Blair |
| Carl Webb | Interchange | Frank Pritchard |
| Ricky Stuart | Coach | Stephen Kearney |

== Match summary ==
Prior to the match, a minutes silence was observed in memory of the Australian Rugby League's Team of the Century coach Jack Gibson who had died only an hour before the game. Gibson's death was announced during the television broadcast by Channel 9's Peter Sterling who had won three NSWRL premierships for Parramatta under Gibson in 1981, 1982 and 1983.

The living members of the ARL's Team of the Century – Reg Gasnier (CE), Mal Meninga (CE), Wally Lewis (FE), Andrew Johns (HB), Arthur Beetson (PR), Noel Kelly (HK), Duncan Hall (PR), Norm Provan (SR), Ron Coote (SR), Johnny Raper (LK), Graeme Langlands (Res) and Bob Fulton (Res) – were paraded to the crowd before the game as part of the Centenary celebrations. Members of the team who had died (Clive Churchill (FB), Brian Bevan (WG), Ken Irvine (WG), Dally Messenger (Res) and Frank Burge (Res)) were represented by family members.

9 May 2008
8:00pm (AEST)

| Australia | 28 – 12 | New Zealand |
|---|---|---|
| Tries: Mark Gasnier (6', 14') 2 Paul Gallen (18') 1 Cameron Smith (22') 1 Israel Folau (64') 1 Goals: Johnathan Thurston 4/5 (8', 19', 23', 66') | 1st: 22 - 0; 2nd: 6 - 12; Report | Tries: Iosia Soliola (43') 1 Sam Perrett (80') 1 Goals: Jeremy Smith 1/1 (44'); Issac Luke 1/1 (80') |

Sydney Cricket Ground
Attendance: 34,571
Referee: Ashley Klein (Australia)
Player of the Match: Cameron Smith
