= National Rugby League Hall of Fame =

- Former name: Australian Rugby League Hall of Fame
- Established: 2002 (reestablished 2018)
- Location: Sydney, New South Wales, Australia
- Type: Professional sports hall of fame
- Website: www.nrl.com/hall-of-fame/

The National Rugby League Hall of Fame was first established as the Australian Rugby League Hall of Fame in 2002, before being reestablished in 2018 in its current form. The hall of fame honours the contributions made to the National Rugby League, Australian Rugby League, Super League and New South Wales Rugby League since 1908 by players, referees, media personalities, coaches and administrators.

When relaunched in 2018 there were 100 inductees, while a major expansion in 2024 included a number of players, coaches, referees, and contributors.

== Background ==
The Hall of Fame was officially established in 2002, to honour the many past greats of the game, who have played in the New South Wales/Sydney league competition, Australian rugby league competition, Super League competition and the National Rugby League.

The first batch of players were inducted to the hall of fame in 2002 including legends of the sport such as Reg Gasnier, Johnny Raper and Wally Lewis. In 2003 another six members were added to the elite club, with six more added in 2004, 2005 and 2006. In 2007 there were three more inductees: three from pre-1940 and three from post World War II.

There were thirty-five members of the Australian Rugby League Hall of Fame up to the end of 2007.

In 2018 the ARL took control of the concept of The Immortals, an accolade till that point administered by Rugby League Week. The ARL clarified the protocols of Immortal induction and the interplay with the Hall of Fame. It was confirmed that Immortals would continue to be inducted rarely & occasionally and would be selected from the overall pool of the Rugby League Hall of Fame. Inductees for the Hall of Fame would occur regularly — perhaps every year —- with six new inductees in 2018. It was also confirmed that the 65 members of the NRL's Team of the Century (selected during the 2008 century celebrations) who were not in the Hall of Fame as at 2007, were all to be entered to the Hall of Fame. Effectively 65 players who had been selected for honour in 2008 were added to the Hall of Fame in March 2018; with a further new six added in July 2018.

Further expansion of the criteria for inclusion have been established since 2023, with categories for coaches, referees, and contributors.

== Selection process ==
=== Categories ===
Player

Individuals who have competed in the elite premiership rugby league competition in Australia and achieved outstanding feats on and off the field throughout a professional playing career.

Coach

People who have coached in the elite premiership rugby league competition in Australia and consistently achieved outstanding results throughout a professional coaching career.

Referee

People who have officiated in the elite premiership rugby league competition in Australia and displayed fairness and integrity consistently throughout a career as a match official.

Contributor

People who have contributed significantly to the growth, popularity and prosperity of the elite premiership rugby league competition in Australia.

=== Eligibility criteria ===
Player

1. Individual must have competed in the elite premiership rugby league competition in Australia
2. Individual must have played the majority of their elite rugby league career in Australia
3. Individual must be retired three years (Note: Originally five, changed to three in 2024) from competing in a professional sporting competition

Coach

1. Individual must have coached at a first-grade level in the elite premiership rugby league competition in Australia
2. Individual may be nominated and inducted at any stage of professional or post-career

Referee

1. Individual must have officiated at a first-grade level in the elite premiership rugby league competition in Australia
2. Individual must be retired three years from officiating in the elite rugby league competition in Australia

Contributor

1. Individual must have contributed significantly to the elite premiership rugby league competition in Australia in fields other than Player, Coach or Referee.
2. Individual may be nominated and inducted at any stage of professional or post-career

=== Metrics of Excellence ===
The Metrics of Excellence, or simply Metrics, is a tailored weighting system applied to specific accolades and areas of achievement at the elite level of the game (i.e. Premiership games played; State of Origin games played; Dally M Medal; Clive Churchill Medal, Grand Finals played, etc.).

The Metrics application automatically compiles players based on the aggregate of points achieved through their collective career achievements. A purely objective function, the application effectively acts as a filtering mechanism.

Equalisation functions are built into the Metrics application to ensure parity for players from different eras of the game (i.e. Pre-War, Wartime period, Super League, etc.) and competitions (i.e. Brisbane Rugby League, Country Rugby League, etc.)

=== Voting process – player ===
1. Metrics of Excellence applied to all individuals that have competed in the elite premiership rugby league competition in Australia from 1908 through to the designated qualification year
2. Complete list of qualified players recompiled based on Metrics results.
3. Top 100 players to achieve the highest aggregate of points through the Metrics process, extracted from complete list and populated on to the Hall of Fame Provisional Ballot.
4. Provisional Ballot advanced to Screening Committee for screening process.
5. Top 25 players selected via screening process populated on to the Hall of Fame Final Ballot.
6. Final Ballot advanced to Voting College for final selection.

=== Screening process ===
1. Provisional Ballot presented to the Screening Committee for initial evaluation.
2. Screening Committee to reduce the Provisional Ballot to 50 by the end of the first deliberation stage.
3. Screening Committee then tasked with reducing the list from 50 to the final 25 players by the conclusion of the second deliberation stage.
4. Final Ballot (25) confirmed and documented by the Awards Sub-Committee.

Screening Process - Hall of Fame
Component	Output
Screening	Overview and Briefing
Provisional Ballot	Presentation of Provisional Ballot List
Deliberation Stage 1	Provisional Ballot reduced to 50
Intermission and Review
Discussion Points	Key Discussion Points tabled for 50
Deliberation Stage 2	50 Nominated reduced to final 25
Review	Awards Sub-Committee to finalise Final Ballot (25)

=== Induction determinant ===
Individuals that achieve an aggregate of 10% or greater of the total points available (375) will qualify for induction into the NRL Hall of Fame.

Component	Points	Description
Nominees	25	Final Ballot
Judges	25	Voting College
Points Per Judge	5	Top Selection
Points Per Judge	4	Second Selection
Points Per Judge	3	Third Selection
Points Per Judge	2	Fourth Selection
Points Per Judge	1	Fifth & Final Selection
Total Points Per Judge	15	Individual Aggregate
Total Points Available	375	Total Aggregate
Total Points Required for Inclusion	38+	10% of Total Votes

=== Induction parameters ===
Player

Minimum two inductions – Maximum four inductions per annual cycle In the event players, outside of the top four tally the same number of votes as those within the top four – a countback mechanism will be executed to determine who received the higher number of five point votes, four point votes, three point votes, etc.

Coach & Referee

Minimum of one induction – Maximum two inductions per four-year cycle

Contributor

Minimum of one induction – Maximum three inductions per two-year cycle

== Hall of Fame inductees ==
=== Players ===
==== Men's players ====
Key to list
Named as an Immortal

No.	Inductee	Active	Achievements	Inducted (Note: Year inducted into previous (ARL) or current (NRL) iteration of Hall of Fame)	Ref
1	Billy Cann	1908–1916	2× Kangaroo Tours (1908–1909, 1911–1912) 3× NSWRL Premiership Winner (1908–1909, 1914)	2008	
2	Tedda Courtney	1908–1924	2× Kangaroo Tours (1908–1909, 1911–1912)	2008	
3	Dally Messenger	1907–1917	Kangaroo Tour (1908–1909) Australian Captain (3 Tests) 2× NSWRL Premiership Winner (1908–1909) Australian Rugby League Team of the Century (2008) New South Wales Team of the Century (2008) No. 4 In Rugby League Week's Top 100 Players (1992) Most Points in an Interstate Match (32)	2003	
4	Sandy Pearce	1907–1922	2× Kangaroo Tours (1908–1909, 1921–1922) 3× NSWRL Premiership Winner (1911–1913) New South Wales Team of the Century (2008) No. 43 In Rugby League Week's Top 100 Players (1992)	2006	
5	Albert Rosenfeld	1908–1924	Kangaroo Tour (1908–1909) 5× RFL Championship Winner (1911–1915) 2× Challenge Cup Winner (1913, 1915) No. 64 In Rugby League Week's Top 100 Players (1992) All-Time Record for Most Tries in a Season (80) (1913–1914)	2008	
6	Arthur Halloway	1908–1921	2× Kangaroo Tours (1908–1909, 1911–1912) Australian Captain (3 Tests) 7× NSWRL Premiership Winner (1912–1913, 1915–1917, 1919–1920) No. 60 In Rugby League Week's Top 100 Players (1992)	2007	
7	Dan Frawley	1908–1915	2× Kangaroo Tours (1908–1909, 1911–1912) 3× NSWRL Premiership Winner (1911–1913)	2008	
8	Howard Hallett	1908–1924	Kangaroo Tour (1911–1912) 3× NSWRL Premiership Winner (1909, 1914, 1918) No. 40 In Rugby League Week's Top 100 Players (1992)	2008	
9	Chris McKivat	1910–1917	Kangaroo Tour (1911–1912) Kangaroo Tour Captain (1911–1912) Australian Captain (3 Tests) No. 42 In Rugby League Week's Top 100 Players (1992)	2005	
10	Viv Farnsworth	1910–1921	Kangaroo Tour (1911–1912) NSWRL Premiership Winner (1910) No. 84 In Rugby League Week's Top 100 Players (1992)	2008	
11	Charles Fraser	1910–1927	2× Kangaroo Tours (1911–1912, 1921–1922) Australian Captain (3 Tests) 6× NSWRL Premiership Winner (1915–1917, 1919–1920, 1924) No. 51 In Rugby League Week's Top 100 Players (1992)	2006	
12	Frank Burge	1911–1927	Kangaroo Tour (1921–1922) Australian Rugby League Team of the Century (2008) New South Wales Team of the Century (2008) No. 17 In Rugby League Week's Top 100 Players (1992) NSWRL Record for Most Tries in a Match (8)	2004	
13	Les Cubitt	1911–1922	Kangaroo Tour (1921–1922) Kangaroo Tour Captain (1921–1922) No. 94 In Rugby League Week's Top 100 Players (1992)	2008	
14	Herb Gilbert	1911–1921	Kangaroo Tour (1911–1912) Australian Captain (2 Tests) Challenge Cup Winner (1914) No. 70 In Rugby League Week's Top 100 Players (1992)	2008	
15	Harold Horder	1912–1926	Kangaroo Tour (1921–1922) 4× NSWRL Premiership Winner (1914, 1918, 1921–1922) No. 12 In Rugby League Week's Top 100 Players (1992)	2004	
16	Cec Blinkhorn	1914–1924	Kangaroo Tour (1921–1922) 2× NSWRL Premiership Winner (1921–1922) No. 44 In Rugby League Week's Top 100 Players (1992)	2008	
17	Duncan Thompson	1911–1925	Kangaroo Tour (1921–1922) 2× NSWRL Premiership Winner (1921–1922) Queensland Team of the Century (2008) No. 10 In Rugby League Week's Top 100 Players (1992)	2005	
18	Jim Craig	1915–1930	Kangaroo Tour (1921–1922) Australian Captain (3 Tests) 6× NSWRL Premiership Winner (1915–1917, 1919–1920, 1930) Queensland Team of the Century (2008) No. 34 In Rugby League Week's Top 100 Players (1992)	2005	
19	Frank McMillan	1921–1935	Kangaroo Tour (1929–1930) Australian Captain (2 Tests) 2× NSWRL Premiership Winner (1929–1930) No. 76 In Rugby League Week's Top 100 Players (1992)	2008	
20	Benny Wearing	1921–1933	7× NSWRL Premiership Winner (1925–1929, 1931–1932) No. 88 In Rugby League Week's Top 100 Players (1992)	2008	
21	Tom Gorman	1920–1930	Kangaroo Tour (1929–1930) Kangaroo Tour Captain (1929–1930) Australian Captain (7 Tests) BRL Premiership Winner (1926) Queensland Team of the Century (2008)	2007	
22	Vic Armbruster	1926–1935	Kangaroo Tour (1929–1930) BRL Premiership Winner (1927) No. 85 In Rugby League Week's Top 100 Players (1992)	2008	
23	Eric Weissel	1921–1939	Kangaroo Tour (1929–1930) No. 32 In Rugby League Week's Top 100 Players (1992)	2008	
24	Dan Dempsey	1922–1934	2× Kangaroo Tours (1929–1930, 1933–1934)	2008	
25	Herb Steinohrt	1919–1938	Kangaroo Tour (1929–1930) Australian Captain (3 Tests) Queensland Team of the Century (2008) No. 56 In Rugby League Week's Top 100 Players (1992)	2008	
26	Mick Madsen	1921–1937	2× Kangaroo Tours (1929–1930, 1933–1934) Australian Captain (1 Test) Queensland Team of the Century (2008) No. 61 In Rugby League Week's Top 100 Players (1992)	2008	
27	George Treweek	1926–1934	Kangaroo Tour (1929–1930) 6× NSWRL Premiership Winner (1926–1929, 1931–1932) No. 35 In Rugby League Week's Top 100 Players (1992)	2006	
28	Joe Busch	1926–1936	Kangaroo Tour (1929–1930) No. 20 In Rugby League Week's Top 100 Players (1992)	2008	
29	Wally Prigg	1927–1938	2× Kangaroo Tours (1929–1930, 1933–1934) Australian Captain (7 Tests) New South Wales Team of the Century (2008) NSW Country Team of the Century (2008) No. 18 In Rugby League Week's Top 100 Players (1992)	2003	
30	Ray Stehr	1927–1946	2× Kangaroo Tours (1933–1934, 1937–1938) 4× NSWRL Premiership Winner (1935–1937, 1940) No. 66 In Rugby League Week's Top 100 Players (1992) NSWRL Record as Youngest Player in a Game (16)	2008	
31	Joe Pearce	1929–1942	2× Kangaroo Tours (1933–1934, 1937–1938) 4× NSWRL Premiership Winner (1935–1937, 1940) No. 45 In Rugby League Week's Top 100 Players (1992)	2007	
32	Dave Brown	1930–1941	Kangaroo Tour (1933–1934) Australian Captain (6 Tests) 4× NSWRL Premiership Winner (1935–1937, 1940) New South Wales Team of the Century (2008) No. 9 In Rugby League Week's Top 100 Players (1992) NSWRL Record for Most Points in a Game (45) NSWRL Record for Most Tries in a Season (38) (1935)	2003	
33	Ernie Norman	1931–1939	Kangaroo Tour (1937–1938) 3× NSWRL Premiership Winner (1935–1937) No. 81 In Rugby League Week's Top 100 Players (1992)	2008	
34	Viv Thicknesse	1932–1937	Kangaroo Tour (1933–1934) 3× NSWRL Premiership Winner (1935–1937)	2008	
35	Vic Hey	1933–1949	Kangaroo Tour (1933–1934) NSWRL Premiership Winner (1934) 2× Challenge Cup Winner (1941–1942) No. 8 In Rugby League Week's Top 100 Players (1992)	2004	
36	Jack Beaton	1933–1938	Kangaroo Tour (1937–1938) 3× NSWRL Premiership Winner (1935–1937) No. 89 In Rugby League Week's Top 100 Players (1992)	2008	
37	Andy Norval	1932–1941	Kangaroo Tour (1937–1938) 4× NSWRL Premiership Winner (1935–1937, 1940)	2008	
38	Herb Narvo	1932–1949	Kangaroo Tour (1937–38) NSWRL Premiership Winner (1943) NSW Country Team of the Century (2008) No. 28 In Rugby League Week's Top 100 Players (1992)	2008	
39	Brian Bevan	1942–1964	3× RFL Championship Winner (1948, 1954–1955) 2× Challenge Cup Winner (1950, 1954) Australian Rugby League Team of the Century (2008) No. 22 In Rugby League Week's Top 100 Players (1992)	2005	
40	Harry Bath	1942–1959	5× NSWRL Premiership Winner (1946–1947, 1957–1959) 3× RFL Championship Winner (1948, 1954–1955) 2× Challenge Cup Winner (1950, 1954) BRL Premiership Winner (1945) No. 30 In Rugby League Week's Top 100 Players (1992)	2004	
41	Arthur Clues	1943–1957	No. 58 In Rugby League Week's Top 100 Players (1992)	2008	
42	Roy Bull	1947–1959	2× Kangaroo Tours (1952–1953, 1956–1957) 2× NSWRL Premiership Winner (1957, 1959) NSWRL Player of the Year (1955) New South Wales Team of the Century (2008) No. 65 In Rugby League Week's Top 100 Players (1992) NRL Team of the 1950s (2007)	2008	
43	Clive Churchill	1946–1961	3× Kangaroo Tours (1948–1949, 1952–1953, 1956–1957) Kangaroo Tour Captain (1952–1953) Australian Captain (27 Tests) 4× NSWRL Premiership Winner (1950–1951, 1953, 1955) 3× NSWRL Player of the Year (1950–1951, 1953) Sun-Herald Best and Fairest (1952) NSWRL Grand Final Man of the Match (1954) Australian Rugby League Team of the Century (2008) New South Wales Team of the Century (2008) NSW Country Team of the Century (2008) No. 1 In Rugby League Week's Top 100 Players (1992) NRL Team of the 1950s (2007)	2002	
44	Duncan Hall	1945–1957	2× Kangaroo Tours (1948–1949, 1952–1953) BRL Premiership Winner (1954) BRL Best and Fairest (1954) JG Stephenson Trophy (1951) Australian Rugby League Team of the Century (2008) Queensland Team of the Century (2008) No. 25 In Rugby League Week's Top 100 Players (1992)	2006	
45	Keith Holman	1946–1961	2× Kangaroo Tours (1952–1953, 1956–1957) 2× NSWRL Premiership Winner (1948, 1952) 3× NSWRL Player of the Year (1952, 1957, 1959) 5× Sun-Herald Best and Fairest (1950–1951, 1953, 1956, 1958) No. 19 In Rugby League Week's Top 100 Players (1992) NRL Team of the 1950s (2007)	2003	
46	Ken Kearney	1948–1961	2× Kangaroo Tours (1952–1953, 1956–1957) Kangaroo Tour Captain (1956–1957) Australian Captain (9 Tests) 5× NSWRL Premiership Winner (1956–1960) NSWRL Player of the Year (1956) No. 75 In Rugby League Week's Top 100 Players (1992)	2006	
47	Brian Davies	1949–1963	2× Kangaroo Tours (1952–1953, 1956–1957) Australian Captain (3 Tests) 2× BRL Premiership Winner (1956, 1958) 4× BRL Best and Fairest (1955–1958) JG Stephenson Trophy (1955) Queensland Team of the Century (2008) No. 41 In Rugby League Week's Top 100 Players (1992)	2008	
48	Norm Provan	1951–1965	Kangaroo Tour (1956–1957) 10× NSWRL Premiership Winner (1956–1965) NSWRL Player of the Year (1958) Sun-Herald Best and Fairest (1954) 3× NSWRL Grand Final Man of the Match (1957–1958, 1963) Australian Rugby League Team of the Century (2008) New South Wales Team of the Century (2008) No. 26 In Rugby League Week's Top 100 Players (1992) NRL Team of the 1950s (2007)	2004	
49	Harry Wells	1951–1972	2× Kangaroo Tours (1952–1953, 1959–1960) NSWRL Premiership Winner (1951) Sun-Herald Best and Fairest (1957) No. 57 In Rugby League Week's Top 100 Players (1992) NRL Team of the 1950s (2007)	2007	
50	Brian Carlson	1951–1962	2× Kangaroo Tours (1952–1953, 1959–1960) Australian Captain (2 Tests) Sun-Herald Best and Fairest (1961) NSW Country Team of the Century (2008) No. 14 In Rugby League Week's Top 100 Players (1992) NRL Team of the 1950s (2007)	2005	
51	Ian Walsh	1950–1967	2× Kangaroo Tours (1959–1960, 1963–1964) Australian Captain (10 Tests) 5× NSWRL Premiership Winner (1962–1966) NSWRL Player of the Year (1964) NSWRL Grand Final Man of the Match (1962) NSW Country Team of the Century (2008) No. 24 In Rugby League Week's Top 100 Players (1992) NRL Team of the 1960s (2006)	2008	
52	Kel O'Shea	1951–1965	Kangaroo Tour (1956–1957) JG Stephenson Trophy (1954) No. 24 In Rugby League Week's Top 100 Players (1992) NRL Team of the 1950s (2007)	2008	
53	Brian Clay	1953–1967	Kangaroo Tour (1959–1960) 8× NSWRL Premiership Winner (1957–1961, 1964–1966) NSWRL Grand Final Man of the Match (1961) No. 68 In Rugby League Week's Top 100 Players (1992)	2008	
54	Keith Barnes	1954–1968	Kangaroo Tour (1959–1960) Kangaroo Tour Captain (1959–1960) Australian Captain (14 Tests) No. 67 In Rugby League Week's Top 100 Players (1992)	2007	
55	Eddie Lumsden	1954–1966	Kangaroo Tour (1959–1960) 9× NSWRL Premiership Winner (1957–1959, 1961–1966) NSW Country Team of the Century (2008) No. 69 In Rugby League Week's Top 100 Players (1992)	2008	
56	Brian Hambly	1956–1967	2× Kangaroo Tours (1959–1960, 1963–1964) No. 74 In Rugby League Week's Top 100 Players (1992)	2008	
57	Johnny Raper	1957–1968	3× Kangaroo Tours (1959–1960, 1963–1964, 1967–1968) Australian Captain (8 Tests) 8× NSWRL Premiership Winner (1959–1966) 2× NSWRL Player of the Year (1961, 1965) 3× Sun-Herald Best and Fairest (1960, 1963, 1967) NSWRL Grand Final Man of the Match (1966) Harry Sunderland Medal (1964) Australian Rugby League Team of the Century (2008) New South Wales Team of the Century (2008) No. 2 In Rugby League Week's Top 100 Players (1992) NRL Team of the 1950s (2007) NRL Team of the 1960s (2006)	2002	
58	Peter Gallagher	1957–1967	2× Kangaroo Tours (1963–1964, 1967–1968) Australian Captain (1 Test) 2× BRL Premiership Winner (1958, 1967) 2× JG Stephenson Trophy (1963, 1967) No. 98 In Rugby League Week's Top 100 Players (1992)	2008	
59	Noel Kelly	1957–1970	3× Kangaroo Tours (1959–1960, 1963–1964, 1967–1968) Australian Rugby League Team of the Century (2008) Queensland Team of the Century (2008) No. 59 In Rugby League Week's Top 100 Players (1992) NRL Team of the 1960s (2006)	2008	
60	Barry Muir	1956–1971	2× Kangaroo Tours (1959–1960, 1963–1964) Australian Captain (2 Tests) 2× BRL Best and Fairest (1959, 1961) No. 55 In Rugby League Week's Top 100 Players (1992)	2008	
61	Ken Irvine	1958–1973	3× Kangaroo Tours (1959–1960, 1963–1964, 1967–1968) 2× NSWRL Premiership Winner (1972–1973) Australian Rugby League Team of the Century (2008) New South Wales Team of the Century (2008) No. 15 In Rugby League Week's Top 100 Players (1992) NRL Team of the 1950s (2007) NRL Team of the 1960s (2006) NSWRL Record For the Most Tries in Premiership History (212)	2004	
62	Reg Gasnier	1959–1967	3× Kangaroo Tours (1959–1960, 1963–1964, 1967–1968) Kangaroo Tour Captain (1967–1968) Australian Captain (8 Tests) 6× NSWRL Premiership Winner (1960–1965) 3× NSWRL Player of the Year (1960, 1962, 1965) Australian Rugby League Team of the Century (2008) New South Wales Team of the Century (2008) No. 3 In Rugby League Week's Top 100 Players (1992) NRL Team of the 1950s (2007) NRL Team of the 1960s (2006)	2002	
63	Ken Thornett	1960–1971	Kangaroo Tour (1963–1964) NSWRL Player of the Year (1966) Sun-Herald Best and Fairest (1965) No. 29 In Rugby League Week's Top 100 Players (1992)	2008	
64	Arthur Summons	1960–1967	Kangaroo Tour (1963–1964) Kangaroo Tour Captain (1963–1964) Australian Captain (5 Tests) NSWRL Player of the Year (1963)	2008	
65	Johnny King	1960–1974	Kangaroo Tour (1967–1968) 7× NSWRL Premiership Winner (1960–1966) NRL Team of the 1960s (2006)	2008	
66	Les Johns	1961–1971	2× Kangaroo Tours (1963–1964, 1967–1968) NSWRL Player of the Year (1968) Sun-Herald Best and Fairest (1969) NSWRL Grand Final Man of the Match (1967) No. 39 In Rugby League Week's Top 100 Players (1992) NRL Team of the 1960s (2006)	2008	
67	Billy Smith	1961–1977	Kangaroo Tour (1967–1968) 4× NSWRL Premiership Winner (1963–1966) Australian Captain (1 Test) NSWRL Player of the Year (1967) Sun-Herald Best and Fairest (1966) 2× Harry Sunderland Medal (1966–1967) No. 46 In Rugby League Week's Top 100 Players (1992) NRL Team of the 1960s (2006)	2008	
68	Graeme Langlands	1961–1976	2× Kangaroo Tours (1963–1964, 1967–1968) Australian Captain (15 Tests) 4× NSWRL Premiership Winner (1963–1966) 2× NSWRL Player of the Year (1971–1972) Sun-Herald Best and Fairest (1970) NSWRL Grand Final Man of the Match (1964) Australian Rugby League Team of the Century (2008) New South Wales Team of the Century (2008) NSW Country Team of the Century (2008) No. 5 In Rugby League Week's Top 100 Players (1992) NRL Team of the 1960s (2006) NRL Team of the 1970s (2005)	2002	
69	John Sattler	1961–1975	Kangaroo Tour (1967–1968) Australian Captain (3 Tests) 4× NSWRL Premiership Winner (1967–1968, 1970–1971)	2008	
70	Bob McCarthy	1963–1978	Kangaroo Tour (1973) Australian Captain (1 Test) 4× NSWRL Premiership Winner (1967–1968, 1970–1971) No. 37 In Rugby League Week's Top 100 Players (1992) NRL Team of the 1970s (2005)	2008	
71	Ron Coote	1964–1978	Kangaroo Tour (1967–1968) Australian Captain (3 Tests) 6× NSWRL Premiership Winner (1967–1968, 1970–1971, 1974–1975) 4× NSWRL Player of the Year (1969–1970, 1975, 1977) NSWRL Grand Final Man of the Match (1971) 2× Harry Sunderland Medal (1970, 1974) Australian Rugby League Team of the Century (2008) New South Wales Team of the Century (2008) No. 23 In Rugby League Week's Top 100 Players (1992) NRL Team of the 1960s (2006) NRL Team of the 1970s (2005)	2005	
72	Arthur Beetson	1963–1981	Kangaroo Tour (1973) Australian Captain (8 Tests) 2× NSWRL Premiership Winner (1974–1975) BRL Premiership Winner (1965) NSWRL Player of the Year (1976) Rugby League Week Player of the Year (1974) Courier-Mail BRL Best and Fairest (1965) NSWRL Grand Final Man of the Match (1974) Australian Rugby League Team of the Century (2008) Queensland Team of the Century (2008) No. 16 In Rugby League Week's Top 100 Players (1992) NRL Team of the 1960s (2006) NRL Team of the 1970s (2005)	2003	
73	John O'Neill	1964–1976	Kangaroo Tour (1973) 6× NSWRL Premiership Winner (1967–1968, 1970–1973) No. 77 In Rugby League Week's Top 100 Players (1992) NRL Team of the 1970s (2005)	2008	
74	Bob Fulton	1965–1979	Australian Captain (7 Tests) 3× NSWRL Premiership Winner (1972–1973, 1976) 2× NSWRL Player of the Year (1973–1974) Rugby League Week Player of the Year (1975) NSWRL Grand Final Man of the Match (1973) Australian Rugby League Team of the Century (2008) New South Wales Team of the Century (2008) NSW Country Team of the Century (2008) No. 6 In Rugby League Week's Top 100 Players (1992) NRL Team of the 1960s (2006) NRL Team of the 1970s (2005)	2002	
75	Tommy Raudonikis	1969–1983	2× Kangaroo Tours (1973, 1978) Australian Captain (2 Tests) Rothmans Medal (1972) Sun-Herald Best and Fairest (1974) No. 63 In Rugby League Week's Top 100 Players (1992) NRL Team of the 1970s (2005)	2008	
76	Mick Cronin	1969–1986	2× Kangaroo Tours (1973, 1978) 4× NSWRL Premiership Winner (1981–1983, 1986) 2× Rothmans Medal (1977–1978) NSWRL Player of the Year (1978) 3× Dally M Centre of the Year (1980–1981, 1983) NSW Country Team of the Century (2008) No. 38 In Rugby League Week's Top 100 Players (1992) NRL Team of the 1970s (2005)	2008	
77	Graham Eadie	1971–1989	2× Kangaroo Tours (1973, 1978) 4× NSWRL Premiership Winner (1972–1973, 1976, 1978) Challenge Cup Winner (1987) Rothmans Medal (1974) Dally M Fullback of the Year (1983) 2× NSWRL Grand Final Man of the Match (1976, 1978) Lance Todd Trophy (1987) No. 36 In Rugby League Week's Top 100 Players (1992)	2008	
78	Steve Rogers	1971–1986	3× Kangaroo Tours (1973, 1978, 1982) Australian Captain (2 Tests) Rothmans Medal (1975) Dally M Medal (1981) Dally M Lock of the Year (1981) New South Wales Team of the Century (2008) No. 31 In Rugby League Week's Top 100 Players (1992) NRL Team of the 1970s (2005)	2008	
79	Steve Mortimer	1975–1988	Kangaroo Tour (1982) 4× NSWRL Premiership Winner (1980, 1984–1985, 1988) NSWRL Grand Final Man of the Match (1985) No. 73 In Rugby League Week's Top 100 Players (1992)	2008	
80	Ray Price	1976–1986	2× Kangaroo Tours (1978, 1982) 4× NSWRL Premiership Winner (1981–1983, 1986) Rothmans Medal (1979) Dally M Medal (1982) 2× Rugby League Week Player of the Year (1979, 1985) 5× Dally M Lock of the Year (1982–1986) Harry Sunderland Medal (1979) No. 52 In Rugby League Week's Top 100 Players (1992) NRL Team of the 1980s (2004)	2008	
81	Mal Meninga	1979–1994	4× Kangaroo Tours (1982, 1986, 1990, 1994) 2× Kangaroo Tour Captain (1990, 1994) Australian Captain (24 Tests) 3× NSWRL Premiership Winner (1989–1990, 1994) 2× BRL Premiership Winner (1981, 1985) Golden Boot Award (1989) Rugby League Week Player of the Year (1990) 2× Dally M Centre of the Year (1990–1991) Australian Rugby League Team of the Century (2008) Queensland Team of the Century (2008) No. 13 In Rugby League Week's Top 100 Players (1992) NRL Team of the 1980s (2004) NRL Team of the 1990s (2003)	2003	
82	Kerry Boustead	1977–1990	2× Kangaroo Tours (1978, 1982) Dally M Winger of the Year (1983) No. 83 In Rugby League Week's Top 100 Players (1992) NRL Team of the 1970s (2005) NRL Team of the 1980s (2004)	2008	
83	Wally Lewis	1978–1992	2× Kangaroo Tours (1982, 1986) Kangaroo Tour Captain (1986) Australian Captain (24 Tests) 3× BRL Premiership Winner (1979, 1984, 1986) Golden Boot Award (1984) Dally M Five-Eighth of the Year (1988) Harry Sunderland Medal (1988) Australian Rugby League Team of the Century (2008) Queensland Team of the Century (2008) No. 7 In Rugby League Week's Top 100 Players (1992) NRL Team of the 1980s (2004)	2002	
84	Peter Sterling	1978–1992	2× Kangaroo Tours (1982, 1986) 4× NSWRL Premiership Winner (1981–1983, 1986) Golden Boot Award (1987) 2× Rothmans Medal (1987, 1990) 2× Dally M Medal (1986–1987) 3× Rugby League Week Player of the Year (1984, 1986–1987) 4× Dally M Halfback of the Year (1983–1984, 1986–1987) Clive Churchill Medal (1986) No. 11 In Rugby League Week's Top 100 Players (1992) NRL Team of the 1980s (2004)	2006	
85	Eric Grothe Sr.	1979–1989	Kangaroo Tour (1982) 4× NSWRL Premiership Winner (1981–1983, 1986) No. 54 In Rugby League Week's Top 100 Players (1992) NRL Team of the 1980s (2004)	2008	
86	Wayne Pearce	1980–1990	Kangaroo Tour (1982) Rothmans Medal (1985) 2× Dally M Lock of the Year (1987–1988) Harry Sunderland Medal (1984) No. 99 In Rugby League Week's Top 100 Players (1992)	2008	
87	Terry Lamb	1980–1996	Kangaroo Tour (1986) ARL Premiership Winner (1995) 2× NSWRL Premiership Winner (1984, 1988) Rothmans Medal (1984) Dally M Medal (1983) 7× Dally M Five-Eighth of the Year (1983–1984, 1986–1987, 1991–1993)	2008	
88	Brett Kenny	1980–1993	2× Kangaroo Tours (1982, 1986) 4× NSWRL Premiership Winner (1981–1983, 1986) Challenge Cup Winner (1985) Golden Boot Award (1985) 2× NSWRL Grand Final Man of the Match (1982–1983) Lance Todd Trophy (1985) No. 27 In Rugby League Week's Top 100 Players (1992) NRL Team of the 1980s (2004)	2008	
89	Gene Miles	1980–1992	2× Kangaroo Tours (1982, 1986) 3× BRL Premiership Winner (1982, 1984, 1986) BRL Rothmans Medal (1987) Queensland Team of the Century (2008)	2008	
90	Steve Roach	1982–1992	2× Kangaroo Tours (1986, 1990) 3× Dally M Prop of the Year (1984, 1986, 1989) NSW Country Team of the Century (2008) NRL Team of the 1980s (2004)	2008	
91	Andrew Ettingshausen	1983–2000	2× Kangaroo Tours (1990, 1994) 2× Dally M Centre of the Year (1994, 1996)	2008	
92	Steve Walters	1984–1999	Kangaroo Tours (1994) 3× NSWRL Premiership Winner (1989–1990, 1994) Rugby League Week Player of the Year (1993) 3× Dally M Hooker of the Year (1991, 1993, 1995) NRL Team of the 1990s (2003)	2008	
93	Allan Langer	1984–2002	2× Kangaroo Tours (1990, 1994) Australian Captain (2 Tests) NRL Premiership Winner (1998) 2× NSWRL Premiership Winner (1992–1993) ASL Premiership Winner (1997) Rothmans Medal (1992) Dally M Medal (1996) Rugby League Week Player of the Year (1996) 3× Dally M Halfback of the Year (1988, 1994, 1996) Clive Churchill Medal (1992) No. 80 In Rugby League Week's Top 100 Players (1992) NRL Team of the 1990s (2003)	2008	
94	Laurie Daley	1986–2000	2× Kangaroo Tours (1990, 1994) Australian Captain (2 Tests) 3× NSWRL Premiership Winner (1989–1990, 1994) Dally M Medal (1995) Rugby League Week Player of the Year (1995) 2× Dally M Five-Eighth of the Year (1995–1996) No. 49 In Rugby League Week's Top 100 Players (1992) NRL Team of the 1990s (2003)	2008	
95	Glenn Lazarus	1987–1999	2× Kangaroo Tours (1990, 1994) NRL Premiership Winner (1999) 4× NSWRL Premiership Winner (1989–1990, 1992–1993) Dally M Prop of the Year (1992) New South Wales Team of the Century (2008) NSW Country Team of the Century (2008) NRL Team of the 1990s (2003)	2008	
96	Bradley Clyde	1988–2001	Kangaroo Tour (1994) 2× NSWRL Premiership Winner (1989, 1994) 2× Dally M Lock of the Year (1989–1990) Harry Sunderland Medal (1992) 2× Clive Churchill Medal (1989, 1991) NSW Country Team of the Century (2008) No. 33 In Rugby League Week's Top 100 Players (1992) NRL Team of the 1990s (2003)	2008	
97	Brad Fittler	1989–2004	3× Kangaroo Tours (1990, 1994, 2001) Australian Captain (25 Tests) NRL Premiership Winner (2002) NSWRL Premiership Winner (1991) Golden Boot Award (2000) Rugby League Week Player of the Year (1997) Provan-Summons Medal (1997) 2× Dally M Centre of the Year (1992–1993) Dally M Lock of the Year (1994) 3× Dally M Five-Eighth of the Year (1998–1999, 2002) NRL Team of the 1990s (2003)	2008	
98	Andrew Johns	1993–2007	Kangaroo Tour (2001) Australian Captain (2 Tests) NRL Premiership Winner (2001) ARL Premiership Winner (1997) 2× Golden Boot Award (1999, 2001) 3× Dally M Medal (1998–1999, 2002) 3× Rugby League Week Player of the Year (1998–1999, 2002) 4× Dally M Halfback of the Year (1995, 1998–1999, 2002) Australian Rugby League Team of the Century (2008) New South Wales Team of the Century (2008) NSW Country Team of the Century (2008)	2008	
99	Shane Webcke	1995–2006	Kangaroo Tour (2003) 3× NRL Premiership Winner (1998, 2000, 2006) ASL Premiership Winner (1997) Rugby League Week Player of the Year (2001) 3× Dally M Prop of the Year (2000–2002) NRL Team of the 1990s (2003)	2008	
100	Darren Lockyer	1995–2011	2× Kangaroo Tours (2001, 2003) Australian Captain (38 Tests) 3× NRL Premiership Winner (1998, 2000, 2006) ASL Premiership Winner (1997) 2× Golden Boot Award (2003, 2006) 3× Dally M Fullback of the Year (1998, 2001–2002) 3× Dally M Five-Eighth of the Year (2004, 2006–2007) Wally Lewis Medal (2006) Harry Sunderland Medal (2008) Clive Churchill Medal (2000) Queensland Team of the Century (2008) NRL Team of the 1990s (2003)	2008	
101	Mark Graham	1975–1989	New Zealand Captain (18 Tests) 2× Dally M Second-Rower of the Year (1981–1982) New Zealand Team of the Century (2007)	2018	
102	Cliff Lyons	1982–2001	Kangaroo Tour (1990) ARL Premiership Winner (1996) NSWRL Premiership Winner (1987) 2× Dally M Medal (1990, 1994) Rugby League Week Player of the Year (1994) 2× Dally M Five-Eighth of the Year (1990, 1994) Clive Churchill Medal (1987)	2018	
103	Ricky Stuart	1988–2000	2× Kangaroo Tours (1990, 1994) 3× NSWRL Premiership Winner (1989–1990, 1994) Dally M Medal (1993) Rothmans Medal (1993) 2× Dally M Halfback of the Year (1990, 1993) Clive Churchill Medal (1990)	2018	
104	Gorden Tallis	1992–2004	Australian Captain (2 Tests) 2× NRL Premiership Winner (1998, 2000) ASL Premiership Winner (1997) Dally M Second-Rower of the Year (1999) Clive Churchill Medal (1998) NRL Team of the 1990s (2003)	2018	
105	Steve Menzies	1993–2013	Kangaroo Tour (1994) NRL Premiership Winner (2008) ARL Premiership Winner (1996) 3× Dally M Second-Rower of the Year (1994–1995, 1998) Dally M Second-Rower of the Year (2002)	2018	
106	Petero Civoniceva	1998–2012	2× Kangaroo Tours (2001, 2003) 2× NRL Premiership Winner (1998, 2000) Dally M Prop of the Year (2008) Harry Sunderland Medal (2006) RLPA Players Champion (2008)	2018	
107	Craig Young	1977–1988	2× Kangaroo Tours (1978, 1982) 2× NSWRL Premiership Winner (1977, 1979) 2× Dally M Prop of the Year (1980, 1985) NRL Team of the 1980s (2004)	2019	
108	Ruben Wiki	1993–2008	New Zealand Captain (18 Tests) NSWRL Premiership Winner (1994) NZRL Player of the Year (2003) New Zealand Team of the Century (2007)	2019	
109	Stacey Jones	1995–2009	New Zealand Captain (7 Tests) Golden Boot Award (2002) 3× NZRL Player of the Year (1999, 2001–2002) New Zealand Team of the Century (2007)	2019	
110	Danny Buderus	1997–2013	2× Kangaroo Tours (2001, 2003) NRL Premiership Winner (2001) Dally M Medal (2004) 3× Dally M Hooker of the Year (2002, 2004–2005) Brad Fittler Medal (2008)	2019	
116	Lionel Morgan	1959–1963	First Indigenous Australia to play with Kangaroos Indigenous Team of the Century (2008)	2024	
117	Les Boyd	1976–1989	2× Kangaroo Tours (1978, 1982) Harry Sunderland Trophy (1986)	2024	
118	Benny Elias	1982–1994	2× Kangaroo Tours (1986, 1990) 2× National Panasonic Cup titles with Balmain Tigers (1985, 1987) 3× Dally M Hooker of the Year (1985, 1988, 1992)	2024	
119	Steve Renouf	1988–2001	Rugby League World Cup (1992) Kangaroo Tour (1994) 2× NSWRL Premiership Winner (1992–1993) ASL Premiership Winner (1997) World Club Championship Winner (1997) NRL Premiership Winner (1998)	2024	
120	Cameron Smith	2002–2020	3× NRL Premiership Winner (2012, 2017, 2020) 3× World Club Challenge Winner (2010, 2013, 2018) 2× Rugby League World Cup Winner (2013, 2017) 2× Dally M Medal (2006, 2017) 9× Dally M Hooker of the Year (2006, 2008, 2011–2013, 2016–2017, 2019–2020) 2× Clive Churchill Medal (2009, 2017) 4× Wally Lewis Medal (2007, 2011, 2013, 2016) 2× Rugby League World Golden Boot Award (2007, 2017) 2× Harry Sunderland Medal (2014, 2017)	2024	
121	Johnathan Thurston	2003–2018	2× NRL Premiership Winner (2004, 2015) World Club Challenge Winner (2016) Clive Churchill Medal (2015) 4× Dally M Medal (2005, 2007, 2014, 2015) 4× Dally M Halfback of the Year (2005, 2007, 2009, 2015) 3× Dally M Five-Eighth of the Year (2012, 2013, 2014) 3× Rugby League World Golden Boot Award (2011, 2013, 2015) Wally Lewis Medal (2008) Ken Stephen Memorial Award Winner (2012)	2024	
122	Billy Slater	2003–2018	2× NRL Premiership Winner (2012, 2017) 3× World Club Challenge Winner (2010, 2013, 2018) Dally M Medal (2011) 3× Dally M Fullback of the Year (2008, 2011, 2017) 2× Clive Churchill Medal (2009, 2017) 2× Wally Lewis Medal (2010, 2018) Rugby League World Golden Boot Award (2008)	2024	
123	Benji Marshall	2003–2021	NRL Premiership Winner (2005) Dally M Five-Eighth of the Year (2011) Rugby League World Cup Winner (2008) Rugby League World Golden Boot Award (2010)	2024	
124	Cooper Cronk	2004–2019	4× NRL Premiership Winner (2012, 2017, 2018, 2019) 2× World Club Challenge Winner (2013, 2019) 2× Dally M Medal (2013, 2016) 5× Dally M Halfback of the Year (2006, 2011, 2012, 2013, 2016) Clive Churchill Medal (2012) Rugby League World Golden Boot Award (2016)	2024	
125	Greg Inglis	2005–2021	NRL Premiership Winner (2014) 2× World Club Challenge Winner (2010, 2015) Clive Churchill Medal (2007) IRL Golden Boot Award (2009) Dally M Fullback of the Year (2013) 2× Dally M Representative Player of the Year (2008, 2009) Dally M Five-Eighth of the Year (2008) Harry Sunderland Medal (2009) Wally Lewis Medal (2009) 2× George Piggins Medal (2013, 2015)	2024	
126	Sam Burgess	2006–2019	NRL Premiership Winner (2014) Clive Churchill Medal (2014) RLIF Player of the Year (2014) Dally M Lock of the Year (2014) 3× George Piggins Medal (2014, 2016–2017)	2024	

==== Women's players ====
No.	Inductee	Active	Achievements	Inducted	Ref
127	Natalie Dwyer	1993–2013	Played 26 Tests for the Jillaroos Inaugural Jillaroos Captain	2024	
128	Katrina Fanning	1995–2006	Played 24 Tests for the Jillaroos ACT Australian of the Year (2020)	2024	
129	Tarsha Gale	1995–2000	Played 15 Tests for the Jillaroos NSW Captain (1999)	2024	
130	Veronica White	1995–2004	Played 17 Tests for the Jillaroos	2024	
131	Karyn Murphy	1998–2013	Played 28 Tests for the Jillaroos Captain Jillaroos to win 2013 Rugby League World Cup	2024	
132	Tahnee Norris	1998–2013	Played 33 Tests for the Jillaroos	2024	

=== Coaches ===
No.	Inductee	Active	Achievements	Inducted	Ref
135	Jack Gibson	1967–1990	Won five premiership titles Eastern Suburbs Roosters (1974–1975), Parramatta Eels (1981–1983) Coached New South Wales in 1989–1990 Dally M Coach of the Year 1982	2024	
136	Wayne Bennett	1977–present	Longest serving coach in history Won seven premiership titles Brisbane Broncos (1992–1993, 1997–1998, 2006), St. George Illawarra Dragons (2010) Won BRL premiership with Southern Suburbs Magpies (1985) Coached Queensland to seven State of Origin series victories (1986–1988, 1998, 2001–2003, and 2020) 16 Tests as Australia coach (1998, 2004–2005) Coached England and Great Britain	2024	

=== Contributors ===
No.	Inductee	Active	Achievements	Inducted	Ref
111	J J Giltinan	1907–1950	Established the NSWRL (1907) Helped Establish Interstate Rugby League in Brisbane Organised and Underwrote the First Kangaroo Tour of England (1908–1909) Honoured Posthumously with the Naming of the JJ Giltinan Shield awarded to the NRL Minor Premiers	2019	
112	Peter Frilingos	1964–2004	Covered Every Grand Final from 1964 to 2003 Covered Four Kangaroo Tours of Great Britain and France Member of 2UE's Continuous Call Team from 1987 to 2004 Naming of the Peter Frilingos Headline Moment Award at the Annual Dally M Awards	2019	
113	Ray Warren	1974–2021	Commentator of the Amco Cup Competition from 1974 State of Origin Commentary Team from 1989 Head Commentator for Nine from 1992 Order of Australia Medal Sydney Cricket Ground Media Hall of Honour	2019	
114	Ian Heads		Journalist and author Covered the game for over five decades, writing over 40 rugby league biographies and histories	2023	
115	George Piggins	1967–2002	Player with South Sydney Rabbitohs 1967–1978 Coach of South Sydney Rabbitohs 1986–1990 Led the fight to reinstate South Sydney to the NRL 1999–2002	2023	
137	Frank Hyde	1953–1990	Player with Newtown, Balmain, and North Sydney 1936–1944 Coach of North Sydney in 1943–1944 and 1950. Broadcaster with 2SM, called 31 consecutive grand finals 1953–1983	2024	
138	Ken Arthurson	1962–2004	Player with Manly Warringah Sea Eagles 1950–1952 Coach of Manly 1957–1961 Administrator at Manly 1963–1983, Australian Rugby League chairman 1983–1997, New South Wales Rugby League chairman 1987–1997 Order of Australia (1988) for services to rugby league	2024	
139	John Quayle	1983–1996	Player with Eastern Suburbs and Parramatta 1968–1976 General Manager New South Wales Rugby League 1983–1997	2024	
140	David Morrow	1980–2024	Broadcaster with Australian Broadcasting Corporation, Macquarie Radio Network	2024	

=== Referees ===
No.	Inductee	Active	Achievements	Inducted	Ref
133	Col Pearce	1947–1967	Refereed 340 first grade matches Officiated in nine Tests, three World Cup matches and nine interstate matches Controlled 513 matches at grade and representative level	2024	
134	Bill Harrigan	1986–2003	Refereed 393 first grade matches Controlled 10 grand finals, 21 State of Origin series matches, and 24 Test and World Cup matches	2024	

== Immortals ==
The Immortals category is reserved for those who are deemed to have had a significant impact on the game of Rugby League. Being named as an "Immortal" of the National Rugby League Hall of Fame is the highest honour which one can receive in the NRL.

Originally Australian sports magazine Rugby League Week named the immortals. In 2017 Rugby League Week closed down and the concept was taken over by the Australian Rugby League Commission.

Immortals
Inductee	Year inducted	Games	Points	Premierships		Highlights
Inductee	Year inducted	Games	Points	Player	Coach	Highlights
Clive Churchill	1981	157 games: South Sydney (157)	13 tries 77 goals 193 points: South Sydney (193)	5 premierships: South Sydney (NSWRL); 1. 1950; 2. 1951; 3. 1952; 4. 1954; 5. 1955	4 premierships: South Sydney (NSWRL); 1. 1967; 2. 1968; 3. 1970; 4. 1971	Representative honours: Australia (37 matches); Australian captain (27 matches); 3× Kangaroo Tours (1948–49, 1952–53, 1956–57); Kangaroo Tour captain (1952–53); Australian coach (29 matches); New South Wales (27 matches); Queensland coach (4 matches); Australian team of the Century (2008); New South Wales team of the Century (2008); NSW Country team of the Century (2008); League honours: 3× NSWRL Player of the Year (1950–51, 1953); Sun-Herald Best and Fairest (1952); Grand Final Man of the Match (1954); NRL Team of the 1950s (2007); Club Coaching record: South Sydney 1958, 1967–75 (141–80–3); Canterbury-Bankstown 1963–64 (7–27–2); Representative Coaching record: Australia 1952–53, 1959–60, 1963 (14–9–1); Queensland 1959 (3–1–0)
John Raper	1981	215 games: Newtown (35); St George (180)	57 tries 4 field goals 179 points: Newtown (30); St George (149)	8 premierships: St George (NSWRL); 1. 1959; 2. 1960; 3. 1961; 4. 1962; 5. 1963; 6. 1964; 7. 1965; 8. 1966		Representative honours: Australia (39 matches); Australian captain (8 matches); 3× Kangaroo Tours (1959–60, 1963–64, 1967–68); New South Wales (24 matches); Australian team of the Century (2008); New South Wales team of the Century (2008); Harry Sunderland Medal (1964); League honours: 2× NSWRL Player of the Year (1961, 1965); 3× Sun-Herald Best and Fairest (1960, 1963, 1967); Grand Final Man of the Match (1966); NRL Team of the 1950s (2007); NRL Team of the 1960s (2006); Club Coaching record: St George 1969 (14–9–0); Cronulla-Sutherland 1975–76 (18–24–2); Newtown 1978 (2–7–0)
Reg Gasnier	1981	125 Games: St George (125)	127 tries 20 field goals 421 points: St George (421)	6 premierships: St George (NSWRL); 1. 1960; 2. 1961; 3. 1962; 4. 1963; 5. 1964; 6. 1965		Representative honours: Australia (39 matches); Australian captain (8 matches); 3× Kangaroo Tours (1959–60, 1963–64, 1967–68); Kangaroo Tour captain (1967–68); Australian coach (12 matches); New South Wales (16 matches); New South Wales coach (2 matches); Australian team of the Century (2008); New South Wales team of the Century (2008); League honours: 3× NSWRL Player of the Year (1960, 1962, 1965); NRL Team of the 1950s (2007); NRL Team of the 1960s (2006); Representative Coaching record: Australia 1964, 1967–68 (8–3–1); New South Wales 1967 (1–1–0)
Bob Fulton	1981	263 Games: Manly-Warringah (213); Eastern Suburbs (50)	147 tries 26 goals 58 field goals 598 points: Manly-Warringah (510); Eastern Suburbs (88)	3 premierships: Manly-Warringah (NSWRL); 1. 1972; 2. 1973; 3. 1976	2 premierships: Manly-Warringah (NSWRL/ARL); 1. 1987; 2. 1996	Representative honours: Australia (35 matches); Australian captain (7 matches); Australian coach (51 matches); New South Wales (17 matches); Australian team of the Century (2008); New South Wales team of the Century (2008); NSW Country team of the Century (2008); League honours: 2× NSWRL Player of the Year (1973–74); Rugby League Week Player of the Year (1975); Grand Final Man of the Match (1973); NRL Team of the 1960s (2006); NRL Team of the 1970s (2005); Club Coaching record: Eastern Suburbs 1979–82 (57–38–5); Manly-Warringah 1983–88, 1993–99 (204–95–6); Representative Coaching record: Australia 1989–95, 1998 (43–7–1)
Graeme Langlands	1991	227 Games: St George (227)	86 tries 648 goals 1,554 points: St George (1,554)	4 premierships: St George (NSWRL); 1. 1963; 2. 1964; 3. 1965; 4. 1966		Representative honours: Australia (45 matches); Australian captain (15 matches); 2× Kangaroo Tours (1963–64, 1967–68); Australian coach (24 matches); New South Wales (33 matches); New South Wales coach (12 matches); Australian team of the Century (2008); New South Wales team of the Century (2008); NSW Country team of the Century (2008); League honours: 2× NSWRL Player of the Year (1971–72); Sun-Herald Best and Fairest (1970); Grand Final Man of the Match (1964); NRL Team of the 1960s (2006); NRL Team of the 1970s (2005); Club Coaching record: St George 1972–76 (70–44–5); Representative Coaching record: Australia 1973–75 (18–4–2); New South Wales 1973–76 (9–1–2)
Wally Lewis	1999	241 Games: Valleys (109); Wynnum (52); Brisbane (46); Gold Coast (34)	122 tries 34 goals 7 field goals 503 points: Valleys (244); Wynnum (127); Brisbane (102); Gold Coast (30)	3 premierships: Valleys (BRL); 1. 1979; Wynnum (BRL); 1. 1984; 2. 1986		Representative honours: Australia (34 matches); Australian captain (24 matches); 2× Kangaroo Tours (1982, 1986); Kangaroo Tour captain (1986); Queensland (35 matches); Queensland coach (6 matches); Australian team of the Century (2008); Queensland team of the Century (2008); Golden Boot Award (1984); Harry Sunderland Medal (1988); League honours: Dally M Five-eighth of the Year (1988); NRL Team of the 1980s (2004); Club Coaching record: Wynnum 1987 (3–1–0); Gold Coast 1992–93 (7–36–1); Representative Coaching record: Queensland 1993–94 (2–4–0)
Arthur Beetson	1999	280 Games: Redcliffe (56); Balmain (74); Eastern Suburbs (131); Parramatta (18)	37 tries 1 goal 113 points: Redcliffe (39); Balmain (20); Eastern Suburbs (51); Parramatta (3)	3 premierships: Redcliffe (BRL); 1. 1965; Eastern Suburbs (NSWRL); 1. 1974; 2. 1975		Representative honours: Australia (28 matches); Australian captain (8 matches); Kangaroo Tour (1973); Australian coach (2 matches); New South Wales (17 matches); Queensland (3 matches); Queensland coach (22 matches); Australian team of the Century (2008); Queensland Wales team of the Century (2008); League honours: NSWRL Player of the Year (1976); Rugby League Week Player of the Year (1974); Courier-Mail Best and Fairest (1965); Grand Final Man of the Match (1974); NRL Team of the 1960s (2006); NRL Team of the 1970s (2005); Club Coaching record: Eastern Suburbs 1977–78, 1985–88, 1994 (74–70–8); Cronulla-Sutherland 1992–93 (17–27–0); Representative Coaching record: Australia 1983 (1–1–0); Queensland 1981–84, 1989–90 (14–8–0)
Andrew Johns	2012	249 Games: Newcastle (249)	80 tries 917 goals 22 field goals 2,179 points: Newcastle (2,179)	2 premierships: Newcastle (ARL/NRL); 1. 1997; 2. 2001		Representative honours: Australia (26 matches); Australian captain (2 matches); Kangaroo Tour (2001); New South Wales (23 matches); Australian team of the Century (2008); New South Wales team of the Century (2008); NSW Country team of the Century (2008); 2× Golden Boot Award (1999, 2001); League honours: 3× Dally M Medal (1998–99, 2002); 3× Rugby League Week Player of the Year (1998–99, 2002); 4× Dally M Halfback of the Year (1995, 1998–99, 2002); Clive Churchill Medal (2001)
Dally Messenger	2018	48 Games: Eastern Suburbs (48)	20 tries 159 goals 381 points: Eastern Suburbs (381)	3 premierships: Eastern Suburbs (NSWRL); 1. 1911; 2. 1912; 3. 1913		Representative honours: Australia (8 matches); Australian captain (3 matches); Kangaroo Tour (1908–09); New Zealand (4 matches); New South Wales (6 matches); Australian team of the Century (2008); New South Wales team of the Century (2008)
Frank Burge	2018	154 Games: Glebe (138); St George (16)	146 tries 49 goals 536 points: Glebe (509); St George (27)			Representative honours: Australia (13 matches); Kangaroo Tour (1921–22); New South Wales (6 matches); Australian team of the Century (2008); New South Wales team of the Century (2008); Club Coaching record: St George 1927–30, 1937 (49–20–5); Eastern Suburbs 1932 (9–6–0); North Sydney 1935, 1945 (17–14–1); Canterbury 1936 (9–4–2); Newtown 1940 (9–6–0); Western Suburbs 1947 (12–8–0)
Dave Brown	2018	94 Games: Eastern Suburbs (94)	93 tries 194 goals 667 points: Eastern Suburbs (667)	4 premierships: Eastern Suburbs (NSWRL); 1. 1935; 2. 1936; 3. 1937; 4. 1940	1 premiership: Eastern Suburbs (NSWRL); 1. 1940	Representative honours: Australia (9 matches); Australian captain (6 matches); Kangaroo Tour (1933–34); New South Wales (19 matches); New South Wales team of the Century (2008); Club Coaching record: Eastern Suburbs 1940, 1943, 1957–59 (38–45–1)
Norm Provan	2018	256 Games: St George (256)	63 tries 1 goal 193 points: St George (191)	10 premierships: St George (NSWRL); 1. 1956; 2. 1957; 3. 1958; 4. 1959; 5. 1960; 6. 1961; 7. 1962; 8. 1963; 9. 1964; 10. 1965	4 premierships: St George (NSWRL); 1. 1962; 2. 1963; 3. 1964; 4. 1965	Representative honours: Australia (18 matches); Australian captain (27 matches); Kangaroo Tour (1956–57); New South Wales (20 matches); Australian team of the Century (2008); New South Wales team of the Century (2008); League honours: NSWRL Player of the Year (1958); Sun-Herald Best and Fairest (1954); 3× Grand Final Man of the Match (1957–58, 1963); NRL Team of the 1950s (2007); Club Coaching record: St George 1962–65, 1968 (80–20–5); Parramatta 1975 (13–12–1); Cronulla-Sutherland 1978–79 (31–17–2)
Mal Meninga	2018	276 Games: Souths (108); Canberra (166)	151 tries 596 goals 2 field goals 1,753 points: Souths (889); Canberra (864)	5 premierships: Souths (BRL); 1. 1981; 2. 1985; Canberra (NSWRL); 1. 1989; 2. 1990; 3. 1994		Representative honours: Australia (46 matches); Australian captain (24 matches); 4× Kangaroo Tours (1982, 1986, 1990, 1994); Australian coach (17 matches); Papua New Guinea coach (2 matches); Queensland (38 matches); Queensland coach (30 matches); Australian team of the Century (2008); Queensland team of the Century (2008); Golden Boot Award (1989); League honours: Rugby League Week Player of the Year (1990); 2× Dally M Centre of the Year (1990–91); NRL Team of the 1980s (2004); NRL Team of the 1990s (2003); Club Coaching record: Canberra 1997–01 (66–57–2); Representative Coaching record: Papua New Guinea 2014–15 (1–1–0); Australia 2016–19 (15–2–0); Queensland 2006–15 (20–10–0)
Ron Coote	2024	257 Games: South Sydney (148); Eastern Suburbs (109)	88 tries 264 points: South Sydney (147); Eastern Suburbs (117)	6 premierships: South Sydney (NSWRL); 1. 1967; 2. 1968; 3. 1970; 4. 1971; Eastern Suburbs (NSWRL); 1. 1974; 2. 1975		Representative honours: Australia (24 matches); Australian captain (3 matches); Kangaroo Tours (1967–1968); New South Wales (15 matches); 2× Harry Sunderland Medal (1970, 1974); Australian team of the Century (2008); New South Wales team of the Century (2008); League honours: NSWRL Grand Final Player of the Match (1971); NRL Team of the 1960s (2006); NRL Team of the 1970s (2005)

== See also ==
- British Rugby League Hall of Fame
