= Arthur Beetson =

Australian former RL coach & Australia international rugby league footballer

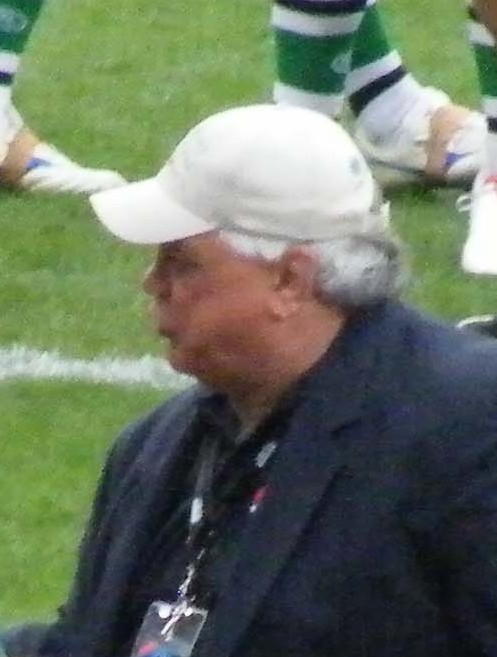
- Beetson in 2008

Personal information
- Full name: Arthur Henry Beetson
- Born: 21 January 1945 Roma, Queensland, Australia
- Died: 1 December 2011 (aged 66) Paradise Point, Queensland, Australia

Playing information
- Height: 188 cm (6 ft 2 in)
- Weight: 16 st 8 lb (105 kg)
- Position: Prop, Second-row
Club
Years	Team	Pld	T	G	FG	P
1964–65	Redcliffe Dolphins	40	13	0	0	52
1966–70	Balmain Tigers	74	6	0	1	20
1968	Hull Kingston Rovers	12	1	0	0	3
1971–78	Eastern Suburbs	131	17	0	0	51
1979–80	Parramatta Eels	16	1	0	0	3
1981	Redcliffe Dolphins	16	0	0	0	0
	Total	289	38	0	1	129
Representative
Years	Team	Pld	T	G	FG	P
1966–77	New South Wales	18	3	0	0	9
1980–81	Queensland	3	0	0	0	0
1981	South Queensland	1	0	0	0	0
1966–77	Australia	29	1	0	0	3

Coaching information
Club
Years	Team	Gms	W	D	L	W%
1977–78	Eastern Suburbs	45	29	1	17	64
1981–82	Redcliffe Dolphins	38	22	0	16	58
1985–88	Eastern Suburbs	97	42	9	48	43
1992–93	Cronulla Sharks	44	17	0	27	39
1994	Eastern Suburbs	6	2	0	4	33
	Total	230	112	10	112	49
Representative
Years	Team	Gms	W	D	L	W%
1981–82	Brisbane	5	2	0	3	40
1981	South Queensland	1	1	0	0	100
1981–84	Queensland	10	7	0	3	70
1983	Australia	2	1	0	1	50
1989–90	Queensland	6	4	0	2	67

Arthur Henry "Artie" Beetson OAM (21 January 1945 – 1 December 2011) was an Australian rugby league footballer and coach. He represented Australia, New South Wales and Queensland all between 1964 and 1981. His main position was at prop. Beetson became the first Indigenous Australian to captain Australia in any sport and is frequently cited as the best post-war forward in Australian rugby league history. He also had an extensive coaching career, spanning the 1970s to the 1990s, coaching Australia, Queensland, Eastern Suburbs, Redcliffe Dolphins and the Cronulla-Sutherland Sharks.

The Arthur Beetson Foundation was so named to honour Beetson, and the Arthur Beetson Medal is awarded to rugby league players who show both outstanding skills and similar personal qualities to Beetson.

== Background ==
Beetson's mother was a member of the Stolen Generation. He was born in Roma, Queensland on 21 January 1945.

== Playing career ==
Beetson's stature, speed and ball skills won countless games for all his teams. His off-loading and attacking workrate broke the mould for front rowers and changed the way they played the game.

=== 1960s ===
Beetson's rugby league career began with Redcliffe in the Brisbane Rugby League competition between 1964 and 1965. After winning the club's player of the year award in 1965 as well as the Brisbane Rugby League premiership with them, he moved to Sydney to play in the New South Wales Rugby Football League premiership with the Balmain club. The 1966 NSWRFL season was his first and he gained selection for the New South Wales team and played in that season's grand final against St. George at second-row forward. Beetson was also selected to make his representative début for Australia against England and set up the first two tries. He represented Australia again at the 1968 Rugby League World Cup, playing at prop forward in the win against France in the tournament final. Beetson then played with Balmain, with a spell in England with Hull Kingston Rovers in 1968.

=== 1970s ===
After the 1970 NSWRFL season Beetson left Balmain to join the Eastern Suburbs club where he would stay from 1971 to 1978. He possessed great strength and toughness, a surprising turn of speed for a big man and was unequalled as a ball player. Beetson continued to represent Australia at the 1972 Rugby League World Cup, playing against Great Britain at prop forward in the tournament final which was drawn. On the 1973 Kangaroo tour of Great Britain and France, he was selected as Australia's vice captain, playing at prop forward in all three Ashes test matches. Beetson then became the first aboriginal player to captain Australia in the second test against France.

His skill as a footballer was matched only by his skill as an eater, earning nicknames such as 'Meat Pie Artie'. He was known and immortalised by his performance of eating 11 hot dogs before a gala dinner for the Australian team in 1973. Beetson captained Eastern Suburbs to the 1974 and 1975 premierships. During this period Beetson also continued playing with distinction for Australia and in 1974 he was named as Rugby League Week's player of the year. During the 1976 NSWRFL season, Beetson captained Eastern Suburbs to victory in their unofficial 1976 World Club Challenge match against British champions St Helens in Sydney. This Easts team would go down as one of the greatest club sides in rugby league history. Beetson joined the Parramatta Eels in 1979.

=== 1980s ===
While still playing in Sydney for Parramatta, Beetson achieved further immortality as captain of Queensland in the inaugural 1980 State of Origin game, won 20–10 by Queensland on 8 July. He capped off that year with a man-of-the-match performance in the Eels' 8-5 Tooth Cup Final win over Balmain. Beetson returned to Queensland for one final year of playing with his old Redcliffe team in 1981, where he also captain-coached the Datsun South Queensland side to a 59-3 victory over Papua New Guinea. He also captained Queensland for the final 'traditional' interstate match in 1981 and at the end of the season the Dolphins were beaten in the final minute of the grand final by Southern Suburbs.

== Post-playing ==
Beetson's coaching career began while still playing for Easts in 1977. He was captain-coach of Redcliffe in 1981 and that season was appointed coach of the Queensland State of Origin side, taking them to repeated series victories over New South Wales from 1981 to 1984. Beetson also coached the Brisbane rugby league team in 1981. He had a brief, but unsuccessful period, coaching Australia in 1983 before returning to coach his former club Eastern Suburbs, from 1985 to 1988, being named Coach of the Year in 1987. Also in 1987 he received the Medal of the Order of Australia "in recognition of service to the sport of Rugby League".

After stepping down as Queensland coach following the 1990 State of Origin series loss to NSW, Beetson became part of the ABC's commentary team in 1991 for their Saturday Afternoon League telecasts alongside chief caller, former Western Suburbs winger Warren Boland, as well as his former Eastern Suburbs and Parramatta teammate John Peard and Canterbury-Bankstown media liaison Debbie Spillane, both of whom worked on the sidelines.

Beetson coached the Cronulla-Sutherland Sharks for the 1992 and 1993 seasons, where he enjoyed mixed success. Part-way through the 1994 NSWRL season Beetson briefly replaced the sacked Mark Murray as coach of the Eastern Suburbs Roosters. Beetson has also spent many years as a recruitment officer for both Eastern Suburbs and Queensland.

In the post-1999 NRL season an Aboriginal side managed by Arthur Beetson defeated the Papua New Guinean national team. He then pushed, unsuccessfully, for an Australia Day match against the Australian national team. He also appeared at the Beenleigh (QLD) lions JRLFC as an Assistant Coach to the Beenleigh Lions JRLFC under 18s (2009) alongside Michael Hansen (Coach) before his untimely passing.

== Accolades ==

- 1975 NSW Sports Star of the year
- Named in Australian rugby league's 100 greatest players
- Named at prop forward in Australian rugby league team of the century
- Named at prop forward in Queensland rugby league team of the century
- Named at prop forward in Indigenous Australian rugby league team of the century
- First Indigenous Australian to captain the Australian Test team (vs France for the 2nd France vs Australia Test on the 1973 Kangaroo tour)

Beetson is often regarded as Australia's best ever forward, and in 2000 he was awarded the Australian Sports Medal, then in 2001 the Centenary Medal "for service to Australian society through the sport of rugby league". He was inducted into the Australian Rugby League Hall of Fame in 2003. In May 2004 his book, Big Artie: The Autobiography was published. Also that year he became the seventh selected post-war "Immortal" of the Australian game with Churchill, Raper, Gasnier, Fulton, Langlands and Wally Lewis.

In February 2008, Beetson was named in a list of Australia's 100 Greatest Players (1908–2007) which was commissioned by the NRL and ARL to celebrate the code's centenary year in Australia. Beetson went on to be named in the front-row in Australian rugby league's Team of the Century. Announced on 17 April 2008, the team is the panel's majority choice for each of the thirteen starting positions and four interchange players. Beetson chose to boycott the presentation ceremony, stating that he did not agree with the direction rugby league is taking. In June 2008, he was chosen in the Queensland Rugby League's Team of the Century at second-row. In 2008, rugby league in Australia's centenary year, Beetson was named at second-row forward in the Toowoomba and South West Team of the Century. He was made a life member of the Sydney Cricket Ground and a plaque in the Walk of Honour there commemorates his career. He is a recipient of the Medal of the Order of Australia (OAM).

As part of the Centenary of League celebrations in 2008, Beetson was retrospectively awarded the Clive Churchill Medal as Man of the Match in the 1974 Grand final.

In 2009 Beetson was inducted into the Queensland Sport Hall of Fame.

In 2010 a program was founded and named in honour of Arthur Beetson, the ARTIE Academy (Achieving Results Through Indigenous Education). The ARTIE Academy operates with an innovative, high expectation, consistent and positive mindset. ARTIE is an academy that students are proud to be a part of. An academy that expects them to achieve to the best of their ability. An academy that will support them in times of need, but not accept excuses for a lack of commitment. ARTIE inspires its participants, encourages and informs them of their progress and celebrates their successes. The program is run by the FOGS (Former Origin Greats) organisation and funded under the "Closing the Gap" initiative. The program continues to operate in schools around Queensland.

Beetson's Queensland State of Origin number 11 jersey was "retired" in 2014.

== Death ==
On 1 December 2011, Beetson died following a heart attack while riding his bicycle at Paradise Point on the Gold Coast, Queensland. He was 66.

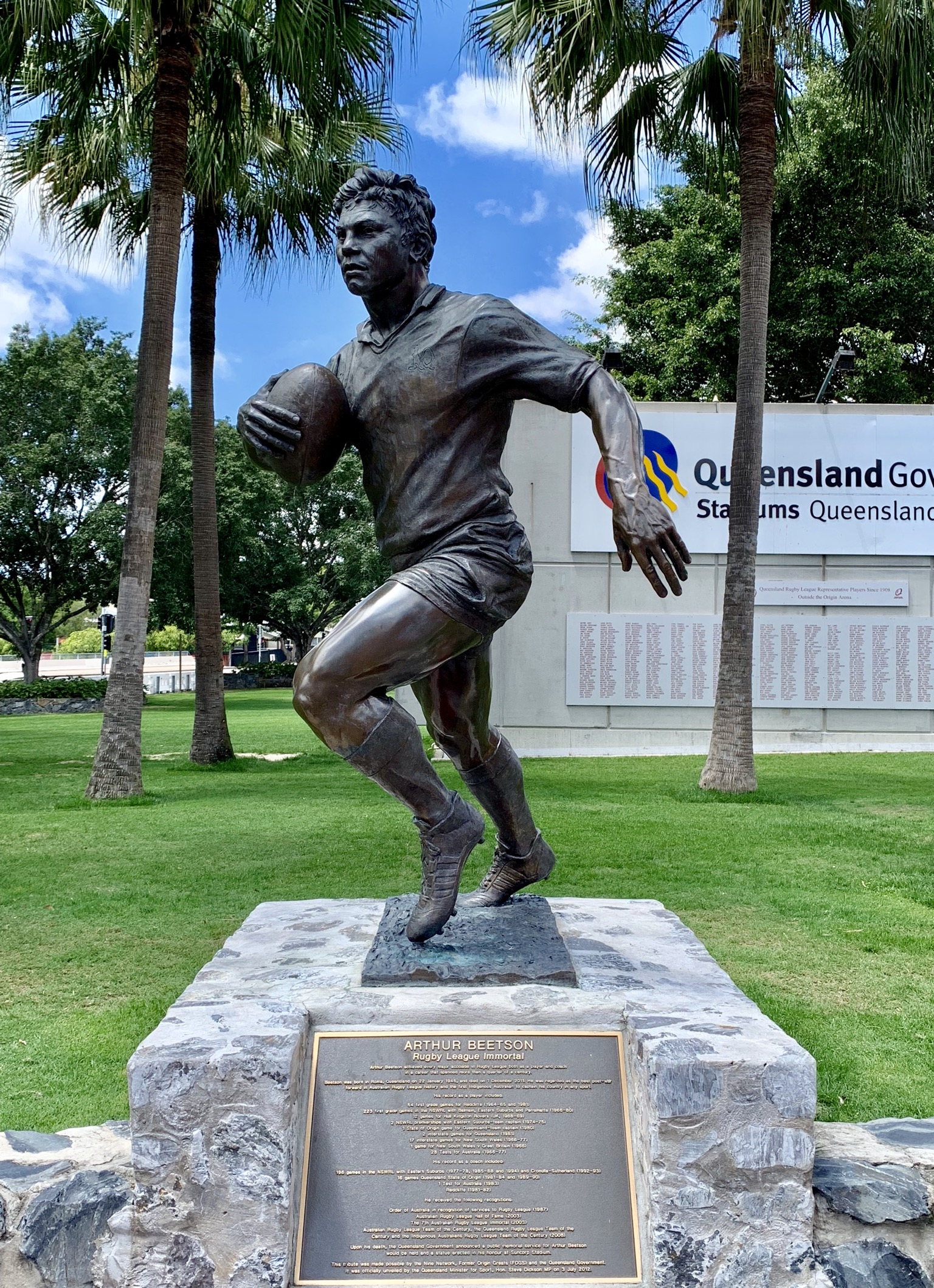
Arthur Beetson Statue at Lang Park

== Honours and legacy ==
The Premier of Queensland, Anna Bligh announced that a bronze statue of Beetson was to be situated at Lang Park. It was unveiled on 3 July 2012.

The Arthur Beetson Foundation was created to engage the community "to empower Indigenous Australians to better outcomes in health, education, sport, employment and business development", and the Arthur Beetson Medal honours rugby league players who have distinguished themselves who have shown not only skill on the field but some of the qualities embodied by Beetson and cares deeply about their people.

On 16 December 2023, a Google Doodle was made to honour Beetson's life and career; the date was chosen because it marked 50 years since his appointment as captain a mainstream Australian sports team.

=== Sydney Football Stadium grandstand naming controversy ===
In February 2022, Beetson's family and supporters expressed their dismay at the Sydney Cricket Ground Trust's decision not to nominate Beetson for the honour of having one of four new grandstands at the new Sydney Football Stadium being named in his honour, despite overwhelming public support.

While the family congratulated the three sporting identities who were nominated to have grandstands named after them (Ron Coote, Johnny Warren and Sir Nicholas Shehadie), they criticised the proposal to name a grandstand Garrison in recognition of locally based British troops from the 1850s. Anthony Mundine and Megan Davis also condemned the decision not to put forward Beetson's name for the honour.

Chairman of the SCG Trust heritage committee Maurice Newman said that Beetson "didn't make the cut" because he was a Queenslander, rejecting the assertion of it being a "snub" and questioned why there wasn't a grandstand named after Beetson in his home state at a venue such as Lang Park. That reasoning was criticised by NRL historian David Middleton, and former players Peter Wynn and Mick Cronin. Rugby league commentator Ray Hadley also criticised the decision after an attempted compromise with an offer put forward to have Beetson honoured with a statue instead of a grandstand.

In March 2022, it was announced that the decision not to name a stand at the new Sydney Football Stadium had been overturned by New South Wales sports minister Stuart Ayres. Beetson's son Mark said the naming of a stand after his father would be a proud moment for his family who described his father as being "up there" with the likes of Cathy Freeman and Lionel Rose as one of Australia's indigenous sporting icons. Mark Beetson also thanked The Daily Telegraph and its readers for lobbying for the change.

== See also ==
- Murri Rugby League Carnival

Sporting positions
Preceded by Tom Raudonikis	(Australia); Australian national rugby league captain 1973-77	Succeeded by John Brass
