= Australian Test Team of the Century =

Australian Test Team of the Century could mean:

- Australian Cricket Board Team of the Century
- Australian Rugby League's Team of the Century

== See also ==
- Team of the century
