= Immortals (rugby league) =

Australian players named as the nation's greatest

The Immortals, prior to the induction of Johns in 2012.

The Immortals of rugby league in Australia are players named as the nation's greatest ever. From 1981 to 2017 the Immortals were named by the Australian magazine Rugby League Week. From 2018, the National Rugby League took over the Immortals concept.

== History ==
Established in 1981, the original group consisted of former Test captains Clive Churchill, Bob Fulton, Reg Gasnier, and Johnny Raper. Although Rugby League Week (RLW) did not hold any official affiliation with the governing bodies of rugby league in Australia, the release was met with much public respect and admiration for the players listed. To coincide with this announcement, Hunter Valley vineyard Elliots Wines released, in conjunction with Rugby League Week, four bottles of 1977 vintage port as a boxed set. Each player was represented on the label of one of the bottles.

Eighteen years later, Rugby League Week announced in 1999 its intention to select a fifth member of the Immortals. The panel of experts was unable to decide on a single player, so it was announced that the next additions to the Immortals would be Graeme Langlands and Wally Lewis. 2003 saw the addition of Arthur Beetson as the seventh Immortal.

Andrew Johns was inducted as the eighth Immortal at the Men of League Gala Dinner the week of the 2012 NRL Grand Final. The judges who deliberated over candidates were Wayne Bennett (seven-time premiership winning coach, former Queensland Origin coach), Ray Warren (Channel Nine network television senior commentator), John Grant (Chairman ARL Commission), David Middleton (leading rugby league historian), Ray Hadley (radio and Channel Nine network television commentator), Phil Rothfield (News Limited), Roy Masters (journalist, Fairfax Media), Geoff Prenter (RLW Founding Editor 1970-81), Ian Heads (RLW Editor 1981-87), Norman Tasker (RLW Editor 1988-2000), Tony Durkin (RLW Editor 2001-02), Martin Lenehan (RLW Editor 2003-11) and Mitchell Dale (RLW Editor). The living Immortals at the time (Fulton, Raper, Langlands, and Lewis) were also granted a vote.

Although the tag of Immortal continues to be a highly respected one, it was initially criticised for only being awarded to post-war players. It was agreed by the first judges in 1981 (Frank Hyde, Harry Bath and Tom Goodman), that they could only judge on players they had seen in action. To overcome entrenched criticism over Johns' admitted use of recreational drugs during his playing career, the rules were altered in 2012 so the candidates can only be judged on their playing ability alone, and nothing else. With the closure of Rugby League Week in 2017, the concept was taken over by the Australian Rugby League Commission. To be eligible to be considered, the player must be a member of the National Rugby League Hall of Fame.

On 1 August 2018, a further five players were announced as Immortals, bringing the total to thirteen. They were Dave Brown, Frank Burge, Mal Meninga, Dally Messenger, and Norm Provan. It was the first time that the three pre-World War II champions could be considered for this recognition, as it had previously been an award restricted to post-World War II players.

== List of Immortals ==
The Immortals
Player	Inducted	Premierships won
Clive Churchill	1981	6
Bob Fulton	1981	3
Reg Gasnier	1981	7
Johnny Raper	1981	8
Graeme Langlands	1999	4
Wally Lewis	1999	3
Arthur Beetson	2003	4
Andrew Johns	2012	2
Dave Brown	2018	4
Frank Burge	2018	0
Mal Meninga	2018	5
Dally Messenger	2018	3
Norm Provan	2018	10
Ron Coote	2024	6

== Living Immortals ==
There are four living Immortals: Andrew Johns (age 52), Wally Lewis (66) , Mal Meninga (66), and Ron Coote (82). The last Immortal to die was Johnny Raper, on 9 February 2022.
