= Warren Ryan =

Australian rugby league footballer, coach and sports journalist

Personal information
- Full name: Warren Redman Ryan
- Born: 27 October 1941 (age 85)

Playing information
- Position: Centre, Lock
Club
Years	Team	Pld	T	G	FG	P
1965	St George	1	0	0	0	0
1967–68	Cronulla-Sutherland	22	1	0	0	3
	Total	23	1	0	0	3
Representative
Years	Team	Pld	T	G	FG	P
1971–72	Country NSW	2	0	0	0	0

Coaching information
Club
Years	Team	Gms	W	D	L	W%
1979–82	Newtown Jets	96	46	5	45	48
1984–87	Canterbury-Bankstown	106	70	3	33	66
1988–90	Balmain Tigers	76	50	1	25	66
1991–94	Western Suburbs	84	37	4	43	44
1999–00	Newcastle Knights	53	30	2	21	57
	Total	415	233	15	167	56

Warren Redman Ryan (born 27 October 1941) is an Australian former professional rugby league football coach and player. He is considered one of the most influential rugby league coaches of the 20th century. Ryan also played in the NSWRFL Premiership for the St George Dragons and Cronulla-Sutherland Sharks.

He was formerly employed as a color commentator by ABC Radio 702 for its Rugby League coverage. Ryan also formerly contributed opinion articles to the Brisbane Courier-Mail and Newcastle Herald.

== Athletics ==
Ryan was also an elite track and field athlete, representing Australia in the 1962 British Empire and Commonwealth Games in the shot put coming seventh in a field of sixteen with a throw of 51 ft 8 in (15.75 m). Ryan accredits his famous attention to detail in his coaching to his Czech-born track coach of this time.

== Rugby league playing career ==
Warren Ryan was a St. George Dragons lower grade player. He played in the Dragons 1965 reserve grade grand final, and appeared in first grade on a number of occasions as a replacement during 1966.

In 1967, he switched to the Cronulla-Sutherland Sharks in their debut season. and became a regular in first grade, and was club Captain at different times during 1967–68.

In 1969 he moved to Wollongong Wests and had four seasons there, the final two as captain-coach. He captained NSW Country in 1972.

== Coaching career ==
Ryan coached Collegians in 1974, and then Wests Under 23s.

He took over as coach of Newtown in 1979 and took them to the 1981 Grand Final which was their first decider in 26 years. Prior to taking over at Newtown, the club had come last three years in a row and had not played finals since 1973. Newtown would lose the 1981 grand final 20-11 against Parramatta. The following year, Ryan could not replicate the previous season with Newtown finishing 7th on the table.

Ryan moved over to Canterbury, coaching them to premierships in 1984 and 1985. In 1986, he took them to a third consecutive grand final where they lost 4-2 against Parramatta. He resigned from the club in 1987.

Ryan moved to Balmain and took them to grand finals in 1988 and 1989. In 1990, Ryan took Balmain to the finals once again but they were eliminated in the first week by Manly.

Ryan went to Western Suburbs, and took them to fifth position in 1991, the year he won the 'Dally M' Coach of the Year. Western Suburbs had not played finals since 1982 before Ryan took over and had finished last four times in the 1980s. The following season, Ryan guided Western Suburbs to another fifth placed position. In 1994, Ryan stepped down as Western Suburbs head coach midway through the season.

Ryan took over as Newcastle coach for two years in 1999. In his first season at Newcastle, he guided the club to 7th on the table where they were eliminated from the finals in the first week by Parramatta. The following season, Ryan took Newcastle to the preliminary final where they surrendered a 16-2 half-time lead to lose 26-20 against the Sydney Roosters. This was Ryan's last game as a head coach.

== Broadcaster and journalist ==
Daily Telegraph journalist Dean Ritchie once wrote, "Abrasive and rude, Ryan hated the media. And I think those feelings were reciprocated." However Ryan had a long media career.

Warren Ryan wrote for the Sydney Morning Herald for many years as a sports journalist. He is also a former member of the ABC Grandstand rugby league commentary team; where, rather than calling the match play itself, he supplied special comments throughout the broadcast.

Ryan used the term "old darky" during the call of an NRL match between the Roosters and Bulldogs. He claimed he was quoting a scene from Gone with the Wind. After listeners' complaints, he was stood down from the ABC with his colleague David Morrow pending an investigation. The scene he claimed to refer to is the 'quittin' time' scene in which a slave calls quittin' time, presuming the role of the foreman. Having asserted his rights, the foreman immediately calls 'quittin' time!' The incident involving Ryan made headlines, while notable indigenous leaders called for an investigation. While the investigation continued, Warren Ryan resigned. He had intended to retire at the end of the 2014 season, but brought it forward rather than face the results. Refusing to address the use of a racist term, Ryan said, "The word used to describe the character was a direct quote from the film. There was no offence intended, so I won't be apologising. It would be insincere. Furthermore, there is no appeasing those who are determined to be offended. So that's it. I've had a long run and, for the most part, it's been very enjoyable."

He proposed his own finals system, an alternative to McIntyre Final Eight and AFL, but it was not accepted.

== Personal life ==
In addition to his rugby league career, Ryan was also a long-time physical education teacher at Belmore Boys High School in Sydney's southwest.

In April 2006, Ryan's son Matthew died of heart failure at age 24 following an overdose of the party drug, gamma hydroxybutyrate (GHB).

On 11 November 2016, Ryan was charged with assault occasioning actual bodily harm after an altercation at Pagewood Hotel. Ryan had allegedly assaulted the 75-year-old man over an argument regarding the outcome of the 2016 United States presidential election. On 23 October 2017, Ryan was found guilty of common assault at Waverley Local Court and was put on a 12-month good behavior bond.
