= Sydney Sunderland =

Australian scientist (1910–1993)

Sir Sydney Sunderland CMG (31 December 1910 – 27 August 1993) was an eminent Australian scientist in the field of medicine, and was a Foundation Fellow of the Australian Academy of Science. He was educated at Scotch College, Melbourne and Brisbane State High School, and the University of Queensland. He was Dean of Medicine at the University of Melbourne.

== Personal life ==
Sir Sydney Sunderland was the son of Rugby League administrator and journalist Harry Sunderland.

== Honours ==
Sunderland was appointed a Companion of the Order of St Michael and St George in 1961. He was knighted in 1971.
