= Ian Tutty =

Australian rower (born 1937)

Personal information
- Full name: Ian Victor Tutty
- Nationality: Australian
- Born: 7 March 1937 (age 89) New South Wales, Australia
- Height: 180 cm (5 ft 11 in)
- Weight: 73 kg (11 st 7 lb)
- Relative(s): Mark Gasnier (cousin); Reg Gasnier (cousin); Dennis Tutty (brother)

Sport
- Sport: Rowing
- Club: Haberfield Rowing Club

Achievements and titles
- National finals: President's Cup 1960, 1962
Medal record
Men's rowing
Representing Australia
Commonwealth Games
Bronze medal – third place	1962 Perth	Single scull

Ian Victor Tutty (born 7 March 1937) is an Australian former representative rower. He was a three-time national champion sculler and an Olympian who competed in the men's double sculls event at the 1960 Summer Olympics. He was a 1962 Commonwealth Games bronze medallist.

== Rowing career ==
The son of a motor mechanic, Tutty was raised in the inner-western suburbs of Sydney. He rowed from the Haberfield Rowing Club. At the 1960 Australian Interstate Championships rowed in Launceston he was New South Wales' single sculls entrant and won his event - the President's Cup. Tutty was selected with Kevyn Webb to race a double scull at the 1960 Rome Olympics. They were the sixth priority boat chosen by the Olympic selectors and had to fund their own travel to Rome. Tutty and Webb were eliminated in the repechage.

In 1962 at the Interstate Regatta, Tutty again won the President's Cup. The next month at the inaugural Australian Rowing Championships held at Lake Wendouree in Ballarat, Tutty and Barclay Wade won the national double sculls title. This enabled their selection as Australia's double scull for the 1962 Commonwealth Games. Australia's prominent internal single sculler at the time was Stuart Mackenzie. He won six consecutive Diamond Sculls titles at the Henley Royal Regatta up to 1962. MacKenzie's non-appearance at the 1962 President's Cup meant that Tutty was chosen as Australia's single sculler for the Commonwealth Games and Barclay Wade was partnered with the President's Cup runner-up Graham Squires in the double. Tutty rowed to a bronze medal in the single at the Commonwealth Games in Perth.

== Personal ==
Tutty's younger brother Dennis was also a rower and found fame as a first grade rugby league player with Sydney's Balmain Tigers. He was the subject a landmark restraint of trade case which changed Australian professional rugby league players' transfer rights. The Tuttys are cousins of Australian rugby league international Reg Gasnier.
