= David Morrow (commentator) =

Australian sports commentator (1953–2024)

- Born: David William Morrow; 5 July 1953; Sydney, New South Wales, Australia
- Died: 17 July 2024 (aged 71); Sydney, New South Wales, Australia
- Other name: Thirsty Morrow (nickname)
- Occupation: Sports broadcaster
- Employers: Australian Broadcasting Corporation; 2GB; Macquarie Radio Network; Ten Network
- Known for: NRL Broadcasting, race caller
- Awards: National Rugby League Hall of Fame (commentator)

David William Morrow OAM (5 July 1953 – 17 July 2024) was an Australian sports radio and television broadcaster/commentator, best known for his association with the Australian Broadcasting Corporation and 2GB, and his calling of horse racing and the NRL, but also other sport and his coverage of the Olympics and Commonwealth Games.

== Early life and career ==
Morrow was born on 5 July 1953 in Sydney. He grew up in the Northern Tablelands towns of Walcha, Uralla, and Armidale.

Morrow started his broadcasting career at Kempsey in 1971 as a general announcer with 2KM (now 2MC) and then became the New South Wales Mid North Coast sports broadcaster. He called local horse races and rugby league matches. He completed an accountancy degree at University of Sydney. In the mid-1970s, he worked as an accountant in Bathurst and was a casual sports broadcaster with 2BS.

== Australian Broadcasting Corporation (as racecaller and NRL commentator) ==
Morrow joined the ABC in 1980 and started calling Friday harness racing at Harold Park and assisting the rugby league commentary team. He ceased calling the harness racing in 1987. In 1985, Morrow became the ABC's number one rugby league radio commentator. He called Saturday rugby league matches on ABC television until the network ceased its coverage in 1996. He called NRL matches on radio with Warren Ryan for fourteen years until both departed in 2014.

== Olympic, Commonwealth Games and others ==
Morrow covered eight Olympic Games and six Commonwealth Games, his first being Olympic Games in 1984 and his first Commonwealth Games in 1986 In 1990, Morrow replaced Geoff Mahoney as the ABC's Sydney race caller. He also commentated on cricket, rugby union, soccer and athletics.

== Other networks ==
In 1990, Morrow worked for Channel Ten and covered the 1990 Kangaroos tour of England. In 1995 and 1996, Morrow called all the Perth-based Western Reds matches for Channel Nine during the Super League War.

Morrow joined the Macquarie Radio Network (now Nine Radio) in 2015 to call NRL matches. Due to illness, Morrow finished calling in February 2024 – a career of calling first grade rugby league for forty-four seasons.

=== Controversies ===
In May 2013, Morrow was suspended by the ABC for a racist joke but made an apology and was reinstated. In May 2014, Morrow and Warren Ryan were stood down pending an investigation into an alleged racist remark made by Ryan during a rugby league broadcast. In July 2014, the ABC stated that it "has reviewed Mr Morrow's responses to the investigation and accepts that he does not condone or endorse terms that are offensive and racist." In releasing this statement, ABC advised that Morrow would retire in November 2014.

== Health and death ==
In February 2024, Ray Hadley announced on 2GB that Morrow was stepping down from his position of calling rugby league, due to a brain cancer diagnosis.

He died due to the cancer on 17 July 2024, aged 71. The previous week it had been announced that he would be inducted into the National Rugby League Hall of Fame, the formal ceremony for which took place in August 2024. (He had previously been a nominee in 2019.)

== Honours and awards ==
- 2005: Medal of the Order of Australia (OAM) for service to the media as a sports broadcaster and commentator, and to the community.
- 2023: Sydney Cricket Ground Media Hall of Fame
- 2024: National Rugby League Hall of Fame as contributor
