= Dave Brown (rugby league, born 1940) =

Australian rugby league footballer (born 1940)

Personal information
- Full name: David Brown
- Born: 13 July 1940 (age 84); Newcastle, New South Wales, Australia

Playing information
- Position: Centre
Club
Years	Team	Pld	T	G	FG	P
1960–62	St George Dragons	51	12	0	0	36
Representative
Years	Team	Pld	T	G	FG	P
1962	New South Wales	1	1	0	0	3
- Source: Whiticker/Hudson

David Brown (born 13 July 1940) is an Australian rugby league footballer who played in the 1960s.

Dave Brown came to the St George Dragons as a 2 year old from Newcastle, New South Wales and played three first grade seasons between 1960 and 1962.

He was a dual premiership winner at Saints, playing wing in the 1960 Grand Final and he played centre in the team that won the 1961 Grand Final alongside the great Reg Gasnier. He represented New South Wales on one occasion in 1962, and played for N.S.W. Country Firsts in 1964–65 whilst playing in the Newcastle competition. Dave Brown attended the Reg Gasnier testimonial at Kogarah Oval on 5 July 2014.
