= Dennis Tutty =

Australia international rugby league footballer & coach

Personal information
- Born: 29 December 1945 (age 80)

Playing information
- Position: Lock
Club
Years	Team	Pld	T	G	FG	P
1964–1971	Balmain Tigers	80	7	0	0	21
1972–1974	Penrith Panthers	46	8	0	0	24
1975	Eastern Suburbs	10	1	0	0	3
1976	Balmain Tigers	18	2	0	0	6
	Total	154	18	0	0	54
Representative
Years	Team	Pld	T	G	FG	P
1967	Australia	1	0	0	0	0

Coaching information
Club
Years	Team	Gms	W	D	L	W%
1980	Balmain Tigers	22	7	0	15	32
- Relatives: Mark Gasnier (cousin); Reg Gasnier (cousin); Ian Tutty (brother)

Dennis Tutty is an Australian former professional rugby league footballer and coach in the New South Wales Rugby League (NSWRL) competition who also represented for Australia. He was also a champion rower for New South Wales and won a national title in 1965. In the 1970s, Tutty won a landmark court case which removed trade restraints on rugby league players. Tutty primarily played at lock.

Tutty is the brother of Olympian sculler Ian Tutty and cousin of Australian rugby league international Reg Gasnier.

== Early life ==
The youngest son and second youngest child of a motor mechanic, Tutty was raised in the inner-western suburbs of Sydney. His secondary education was at Ibrox Park Boys High School and he left school after obtaining his Intermediate Certificate at the end of Year 9. At school he played a number of sports including Rugby League representing the school and the school's sports zone at various levels including a curtain raiser to an international match in 1962.

After leaving school he joined the Leichhardt Wanderers Junior League Football Club in 1963, a junior team affiliated with the Balmain Tigers club.

Like his older brother, Tutty rowed for the (then) Haberfield Rowing Club and for New South Wales. He rowed in the five seat of the New South Wales eight which won King's Cup in 1965.

== Playing career ==
Tutty was graded to Balmain in 1964 at the age of seventeen. He became the youngest player to ever appear in a grand final when Balmain met St. George at the end of that season. He played ostensibly as an amateur so that he could continue to compete in what was then the strictly non-professional sport of rowing.

In 1967, Tutty was selected to play in his only Test appearance, against New Zealand in the first Test at the Sydney Cricket Ground.

In March 1968, citing unhappiness with the terms of his contract, Tutty applied to the Tigers for a clearance to play with another club. At the time, clubs were able to prevent any professional player who had played in one of its teams from playing with any other club, even if the player no longer played for the retaining club. The request was refused and Tutty then lodged an appeal with the New South Wales Rugby League. In May, he withdrew the appeal before it was heard and agreed to play for Balmain for the 1968 season for an increased remuneration. At the end of the 1968 season, Tutty applied once more to be placed on the transfer list but he was again refused and his name was placed on the 'retain' list. Tutty did not appeal the second refusal but sat out the 1969 season, not playing for any team.

Tutty commenced legal action in May 1969. He fought for over two years for the right for players to transfer to another club. The New South Wales Equity Court granted Tutty's application to have the League's transfer system declared invalid, deeming it an 'unreasonable restraint of trade'. The League appealed to the High Court of Australia but on 13 December 1971, the High Court's judgement upheld the Equity Court's decision. The implications of Tutty's successful legal action were quickly felt throughout the game. In the first two months, South Sydney lost three internationals, John O'Neill, Ray Branighan and Ron Coote.

After two years sitting out of the game, and while still waiting for a legal decision, Tutty returned to play for Balmain during 1971. He played seventeen games but did not receive any remuneration from the club. Tutty was free to play for the Penrith Panthers in 1972 and he remained with the club for three seasons.

In 1975, Tutty moved to Eastern Suburbs. A broken arm during the season prevented him from participating in Easts' 38–0 win over St. George in the grand final.

Tutty spent his final year in first-grade, 1976, back at Balmain.

== Coaching career ==
Tutty spent one season as a first-grade coach, with Balmain in 1980. The season was not successful for the team or for Tutty, winning only seven games from twenty-two. He stood down at the end of the 1980 season and was succeeded by Frank Stanton.

Tutty coached the Forster Tuncurry Hawks to successive Clayton Cup wins in 1994 and 1995.

== Post career recognition ==
In 2008 the Rugby League Players Association instituted the "Dennis Tutty Clubman of the Year" award presented to the person who has "demonstrated the same qualities of self-sacrifice and courage as Dennis Tutty to achieve a better working environment for his fellow Rugby League Players". The inaugural recipient of the award was Jason King. In 2013 the award went to Clint Newton.

== Published sources ==
- Alan Whiticker & Glen Hudson (2007). The Encyclopedia of Rugby League Players. Wetherill Park, New South Wales: Gary Allen Pty Ltd. p. 560. ISBN 978-1-877082-93-1.
- Graham McNeice & Ian Collis (1996). That's Rugby League. Sydney: Pan Macmillan Australia. pp. 252–255. ISBN 978-0-330-35848-4.
- Bob Stewart (2007). The Games are Not the Same: The Political Economy of Football in Australia. Melbourne University Publishing. p. 117. ISBN 978-0-522-85367-4.

Sporting positions
Preceded by Ron Willey; 1977–1979	Coach Balmain Tigers; 1980	Succeeded by Frank Stanton; 1981–1986
