= Rugby League Week =

Australian rugby league magazine

- Steve Roach, Tina Turner, and Martin Bella on the Rugby League Week front cover (Issue No. 1, 1990)
- Editor: Chris Clark
- Categories: Sport, Rugby league
- Frequency: Weekly during NRL season
- Circulation: 22,532
- Founded: 1970
- Final issue: 2017
- Company: Bauer Media Group
- Country: Australia
- Based in: Sydney
- Language: English
- Website: www.rugbyleagueweek.com.au
- ISSN: 0035-9742

Rugby League Week (frequently abbreviated to RLW) was the highest selling Australian rugby league magazine, ahead of major competitor Big League. It was published weekly (on Wednesdays) during the Australian rugby league season, which runs from March to late September (roughly corresponding to the southern hemisphere autumn and winter). The magazine was headquartered in Sydney.

== History ==
Rugby League Week was launched in 1970. In 2001 the magazine's name was changed to League Week, to avoid confusion with rugby union. It reverted to Rugby League Week in 2003. It was owned by Bauer Media Group. The former owner was ACP Magazines. The last edition was published on 27 March 2017.

== Content ==
The magazine contained news coverage of Australian rugby league, focused primarily on the first-grade NRL competition (previously the NSWFL) but with coverage also devoted to lower-level competitions. There were usually also several profiles of rugby league players in each edition. A number of league personalities, including Mark Geyer, Stacey Jones and Wally Lewis, had regular columns; unconfirmed rumours and miscellaneous gossip are reported in a column written by 'The Mole'.

Each edition contains previews of the games to be played in the next NRL round, running from Friday to Monday. Details of every match from the previous round are also included: the games are assessed and each player who took the field, as well as the referee, is given a rating. Details of when and by whom points were scored are also included. (Before the formation of the Brisbane Broncos, these ratings and details were also given for the Brisbane Rugby League competition.) Results, but not ratings, are published for most notable rugby league competitions in Australia, as well as major competitions in New Zealand and England.

== Player of the Year ==
Related to the rating of players ever since Rugby League Week was first published during the 1970 NSWRFL season has been its Player of the Year award.

Since 1978, players have been rated out of ten for every game. To deal with absences from club rugby due to interstate and Test duty, the five lowest scores of every player are deleted from their final score. After these five lowest scores are removed, the player with the highest score wins the award.

From 1970 to 1977, the method of judging was the same except that players were awarded points out of five instead of ten.

Year	Player
1970	Tommy Bishop
1971	Bob Grant
1972	John Ballesty
1973	Johnny Mayes
1974	Arthur Beetson
1975	Bob Fulton
1976	Ray Higgs
1977	Mick Cronin
1978	Geoff Gerard
1979	Ray Price
1980	Kevin Hastings
1981	Kevin Hastings
1982	Kevin Hastings
1983	Phil Sigsworth
1984	Peter Sterling
1985	Ray Price
1986	Peter Sterling
1987	Peter Sterling
1988	Ben Elias
1989	Gavin Miller
1990	Mal Meninga
1991	Ewan McGrady
1992	Paul Langmack
1993	Steve Walters
1994	Cliff Lyons
1995	Laurie Daley
1996	Allan Langer
1997	Brad Fittler
1998	Andrew Johns
1999	Andrew Johns
2000	Andrew Johns
2001	Andrew Johns
2002	Andrew Johns
2003	Steve Price
2004	Nathan Hindmarsh
2005	Nathan Hindmarsh
2006	Luke Bailey
2007	Johnathan Thurston
2008	Billy Slater
2009	Jarryd Hayne
2010	Paul Gallen
2011	Corey Parker
2012	Ben Barba
2014	Jarryd Hayne
2015	Roger Tuivasa-Sheck
2016	Jason Taumalolo

== The Immortals ==
In 1981 Rugby League Week named 'The Immortals', four players that they considered to be the greatest in Australian history. In 1999 another two were added and in 2003 another one. At the end of the 2012 NRL season it was decided that Andrew Johns would become the eighth immortal. Currently numbering eight, The Immortals are:

- Arthur Beetson
- Clive Churchill
- Bob Fulton
- Reg Gasnier
- Graeme Langlands
- Wally Lewis
- Johnny Raper
- Andrew Johns

== Ten out of Ten ==
Since the 1978 NSWRFL season, Rugby League Week has rated each player in each premiership and representative game on a scale of 1-10. There have been 17 players since 1978 to achieve the rare feat of being rated 10/10 for a game. Manly-Warringah second row forward Terry Randall had the honour of being the first player to be rated 10/10 in the opening round of the 1978 season. Parramatta halfback Peter Sterling is the only player to achieve this twice while Brad Fittler is the only player to receive 10/10 in a representative game having done so in the second test of the 1995 Trans-Tasman Test series against New Zealand.

RLW's 10/10 ratings since 1978 include:

- Terry Randall (Manly-Warringah) vs St George, 26 March 1978 at Brookvale Oval
- Geoff Foster (Western Suburbs) vs St George, 2 April 1978 at Lidcombe Oval
- Larry Corowa (Balmain) vs Newtown, 2 April 1978 at Leichhardt Oval
- Graham Murray (Parramatta) vs St George, 23 July 1978 at Cumberland Oval
- Rocky Laurie (South Sydney) vs St George, 29 March 1980 at Kogarah Oval
- John Dowling (St George) vs North Sydney, 27 April 1980 at North Sydney Oval
- Johnny Gibbs (Manly-Warringah) vs Cronulla-Sutherland, 9 August 1981 at Endeavour Field
- Greg Brentnall (Canterbury-Bankstown) vs Manly-Warringah, 19 June 1982 at Brookvale Oval
- Kevin Hastings (Eastern Suburbs) vs Penrith, 3 April 1983 at Penrith Park
- Peter Sterling (Parramatta) vs St George, 16 March 1986 at Parramatta Stadium
- Peter Sterling (Parramatta) vs Eastern Suburbs, 26 May 1987 at Parramatta Stadium
- Bradley Clyde (Canberra) vs Western Suburbs, 11 August 1991 at Bruce Stadium
- Brad Fittler (Australia) vs New Zealand (Test match), 7 July 1995 at Sydney Football Stadium
- Greg Florimo (North Sydney) vs Manly-Warringah, 30 June 1997 at North Sydney Oval
- Brett Kimmorley (Cronulla-Sutherland) vs Newcastle, 11 August 2002 at Endeavour Field
- Andrew Johns (Newcastle) vs Melbourne, 30 July 2005 at Hunter Stadium
- Jarryd Hayne (Parramatta) vs Brisbane, 23 July 2007 at Lang Park

== See also ==
- Big League
- Rugby League Review
