= Graeme Langlands =

Australian RL coach and former Australia international rugby league footballer

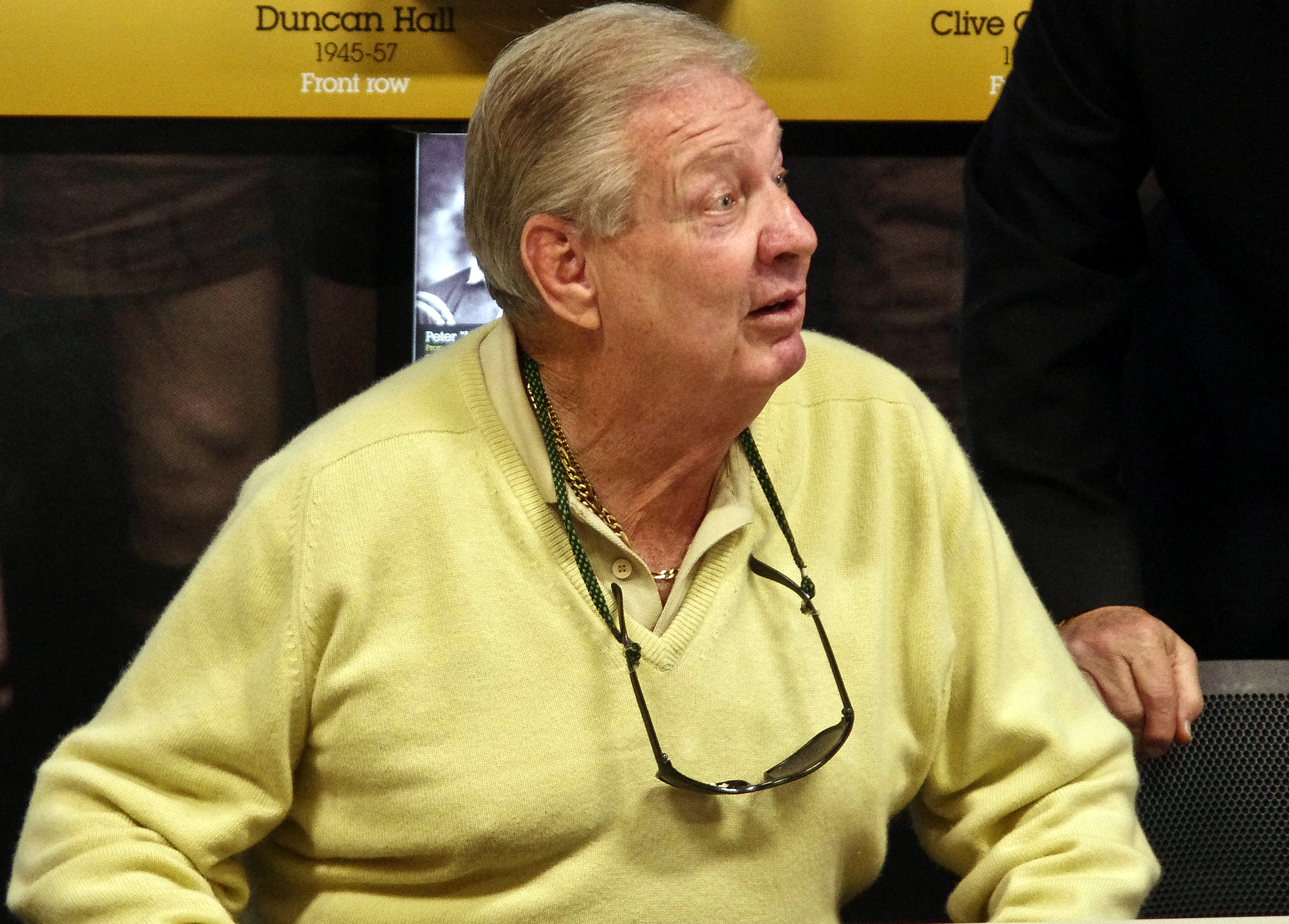
- Langlands in 2014

Personal information
- Full name: Graeme Frank Langlands
- Born: 2 September 1941 Wollongong, New South Wales, Australia
- Died: 20 January 2018 (aged 76) Sutherland, New South Wales, Australia

Playing information
- Height: 182 cm (6 ft 0 in)
- Weight: 12 st 4 lb (78 kg)
- Position: Fullback, Centre
Club
Years	Team	Pld	T	G	FG	P
1959–62	Wollongong
1963–76	St. George	227	86	648	0	1554
	Total	227	86	648	0	1554
Representative
Years	Team	Pld	T	G	FG	P
1962	NSW Country Firsts	1	0	0	0	0
1962–75	New South Wales	33	19	40	0	137
1963–75	Australia	45	21	73	0	206
1966–75	NSW City Firsts	8	5	32	0	79

Coaching information
Club
Years	Team	Gms	W	D	L	W%
1972–76	St. George	119	70	5	44	59
Representative
Years	Team	Gms	W	D	L	W%
1973–76	NSW City Firsts	3	2	0	1	67
1973–76	New South Wales	12	9	0	1	75
1973–75	Australia	24	18	2	4	75

Graeme Frank Langlands, MBE, (2 September 1941 – 20 January 2018), also known by the nickname of "Changa", was an Australian professional rugby league footballer who played from the 1950s till the 1970s and coached in the 1970s.

He retired as the most-capped player for the Australia national team with 45 international appearances from 1963 to 1975, and captained his country in 15 Test matches and World Cup games. Langlands was the fullback and goal-kicker for the St. George Dragons in the latter half of their 11-year consecutive premiership-winning run from 1956 to 1966.

== Background ==
Langlands was born on 2 September 1941 in Wollongong, New South Wales, Australia to Frank Horace Langlands and Hazel Miriam Ferguson. He had an unhappy childhood brought up by his alcoholic father.

== Playing career ==
Langlands represented Combined NSW High Schools from 1955 to 1957 and was playing 1st grade with the Wollongong Club in the Illawarra competition at age 18. The fullback got his first big break with selection for Country Firsts in 1962 following the withdrawal of Newcastle's Les Johns due to injury. That same year he made the first of a record 33 interstate matches for New South Wales over 14 seasons.

With Billy Smith, who also joined St. George in 1963, Langlands added new energy to the ageing Dragons champion line-up, initially as Reg Gasnier's centre partner, but later moving on to fullback. On the field, Langlands and Smith demonstrated an intuitive understanding of each other's kicking and positional game.

He made his Test debut as a centre against New Zealand at the Sydney Cricket Ground in 1963. The depth of the selectors' fullback options, including incumbents Ken Thornett then Les Johns, meant that Langlands spent the first four years of his Test career at centre. He excelled there and in the Ashes deciding 2nd Test at Station Road in Swinton against Great Britain on the 1963–64 Kangaroo Tour he scored an Anglo-Australian record of 20 individual points in the historic 50–12 "Swinton massacre". 1963 also saw the Kangaroos win The Ashes in England for the first time as solely an Australian team (the 1911–12 Kangaroo Tour had included New Zealand players), starting a run from 1963 until the present where Australia hasn't lost a series on a Kangaroo Tour. Thereafter Langlands played international football for Australia every season for 13 seasons.

Langlands played in four St George Grand final winning sides, including 1966 where he kicked seven goals to beat Balmain. He was the competition's leading point scorer in season 1971 and season 1973. He was the Dragon's top point scorer in first grade in 10 seasons between 1963 and 1975.

Later in the 1960s, and early 1970s St George got their best value out of Smith and Langlands when all of the stars of the long reign had gone. It was largely due to their combined class that the club remained competitive up until 1975.

He first captained Australia for the 1970 Ashes series and thereafter barring injury for the next five years. He was Captain-Coach for the 1972 World Cup series, the 1973 Kangaroo tour and the 1974 Test Series at home against Great Britain. In the deciding 3rd game in 1974, Langlands's final and most memorable of his 34 Test appearances, he played a magnificent match to win the Ashes, scoring a try and kicking five goals to take his career tally against Great Britain over the 100-point mark. The Kangaroos thus came from 16–10 behind at half-time to win the match 22–18, with Langlands kicking the goal which gave his side their winning lead. After the game he was carried aloft from the field by his team-mates with the 55,505 strong SCG crowd chanting "Changa, Changa". Since the 1974 series, Australia has not yet lost The Ashes to either Great Britain or England.

Langlands last captained Australia in their undefeated four match campaign of the 1975 World Cup. He was the last Kangaroo selected in the dual Captain-Coach role. He also retired with the record of Australia's top point-scorer against Great Britain until surpassed by Mal Meninga in 1992.

=== Greatest try never scored ===
During the final of the 1972 World Cup played between Australia and Great Britain at the Stade de Gerland in Lyon, France, Langlands was involved in what many believe to be the "greatest try never scored". During the first half of the game (which ended in a 10-all draw and gave the Lions the World Cup based on previous results of the tournament), Australian halfback Dennis Ward put up a bomb about 45 metres from the Lions try line. Langlands gave chase and as the ball came down over the try line, he leaped into the air and caught it on the full and had seemingly scored a spectacular try. The French referee Georges Jameau disallowed it though, believing Langlands to be offside. Television replays however showed the Australian Captain-coach was approximately half a metre onside and that he had scored a fair try.

=== The white boots affair ===
An incident renowned in Australian rugby league concerns Langlands playing for the Dragons in the 1975 NSWRL Grand Final against Jack Gibson's Eastern Suburbs. Before the game, Langlands, who was pulling up poorly from a long-standing groin injury, was given a painkilling injection that, rather than deadening his pain, made his whole leg numb. Langlands wrote in his book Larrikin and Saint: "It was an injection that went wrong. It wasn't the doctor's fault. The injection went in where the nerves shouldn't have been. They had moved because of all the injuries that I've had around the groin".

When Langlands kicked for the touchline early in the match but missed, it became obvious to everyone that something was wrong. The Dragons' match plan was to keep the Roosters pinned back in their own half with long kicks. With their main kicker useless, the Dragons found themselves unable to stop the Roosters advancing. After a heated argument with Dragons club secretary-treasurer Frank Facer in the dressing rooms at half time, Langlands made his way back onto the field after half-time, but made little difference as the Roosters ran in seven tries to win 38–0. Making matters worse were his white football boots, worn as part of a sponsorship deal with Adidas. At the time, black football boots were the norm and Langlands's white boots were unique on the field, highlighting every mistake he made to the fans. Langlands later admitted regret at not listening to Facer and returning to the field for the second half. He was originally planning to retire at the end of the Grand Final, but the humiliating experience spurred him to return in 1976, where in the few early-season matches he played his performance was mediocre.

== Accolades ==
Langlands was awarded Life Membership of the St. George Dragons in 1973. He retired in 1976 at age 34 after 235 matches (all grades) for St George. Though regarded as having played one season too many, he finished his career as one of the most respected men to ever play the game.

In his retirement year he was awarded a Member of the Order of the British Empire, (MBE) medal for his contribution to Rugby League and club life.

In 1985 Rugby League Week nominated an Australian 'Masters' side picking its 13 best players since 1970. Amongst them were eight Australian former captains. Dressing in their Australian strip for a commemorative photo at the Sydney Cricket Ground Langlands was late to take his seat. He arrived to find one spot left – front row, centre seat. These legendary players had spontaneously selected him as their Captain, showing the regard in which he was held by his peers.

Langlands was inducted into the Sport Australia Hall of Fame in 1986.

In 1999 Langlands, and Queensland State of Origin legend Wally Lewis became the fifth & sixth selected post-war "Immortals" respectively of the Australian Rugby League, joining original Immortals Clive Churchill, Bob Fulton, Reg Gasnier, and Johnny Raper who had been chosen in 1981 by noted publication Rugby League Week.

In 2002 Langlands was inducted into the Australian Rugby League Hall of Fame.

In February 2008, Langlands was named in the list of Australia's 100 Greatest Players (1908–2007) which was commissioned by the NRL and ARL to celebrate the code's centenary year in Australia. Langlands went on to be named as an interchange player in Australian rugby league's Team of the Century. Announced on 17 April 2008, the team is the panel's majority choice for each of the thirteen starting positions and four interchange players. In 2008 New South Wales announced their rugby league team of the century also, naming Langlands at centre.

On 20 July 2022, Langlands was named in the St. George Dragons District Rugby League Club's team of the century at fullback.

== Personal and life after football ==
Langlands married Lynne Burgess in 1966 and they had three children. Their marriage ended in the mid 1970s. With another partner he had a fourth child, the renowned Sydney fitness entrepreneur Trent Langlands who has stated that he never had any relationship with his father.

After football Langlands had a number of business ventures in the hospitality industry some successful, some not. He ran a brewery truck, worked in bottle shops and pubs and for a period in the 1990s ran a bar in Manila in the Philippines.

In November 2017, it was announced that Langlands had been charged with historic sex offences allegedly occurring in Molendinar in 1982. The charges were dropped after Langlands's death in January 2018.

Langlands died on 20 January 2018 at a nursing facility in Sydney's Sutherland Shire at the age of 76. He was being treated for dementia and Alzheimer's disease.

== Notes ==
Sporting positions
Preceded by John Sattler	Australian national rugby league captain 1970–75	Succeeded by Phil Hawthorne
