= Harry Sunderland =

Australian rugby league administrator & journalist (1889-1964)

- Born: 23 November 1889; Gympie, Queensland, Australia
- Died: 15 January 1964 (aged 74); Chorlton upon Medlock, Manchester, England, U.K.
- Occupations: Administrator; Journalist

Harry Sunderland (23 November 1889 – 15 January 1964) was an Australian rugby league football administrator and journalist.

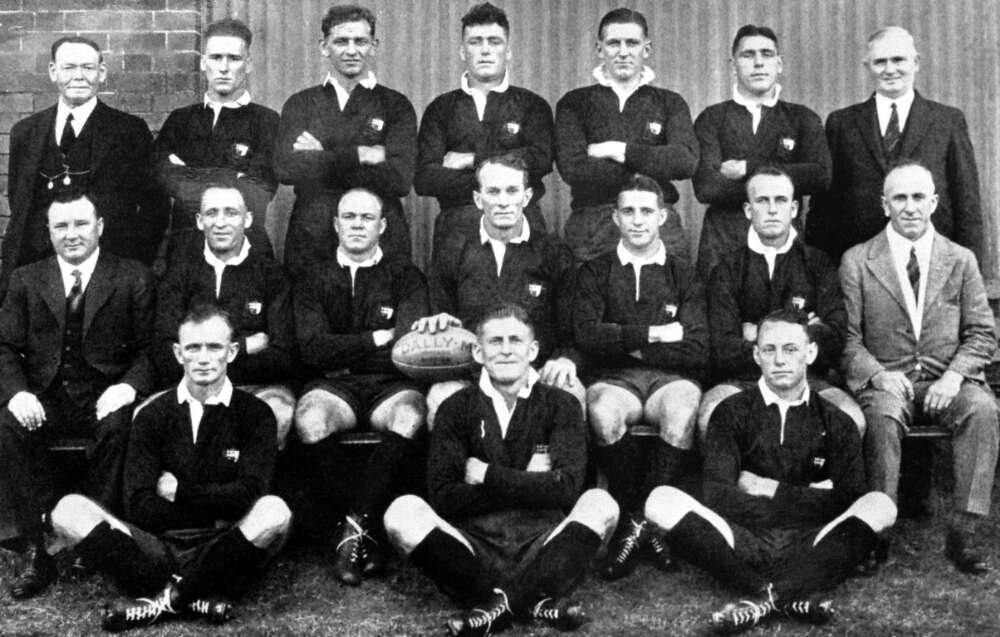
Australian Test side v England 6 Jun 1932, Sunderland seated far left

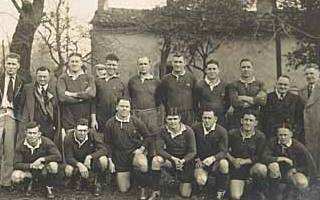
Sunderland with 1937-38 Kangaroos (standing, 2nd left)

Sunderland was born in Gympie, Queensland in 1889. From 1913 to 1922, Sunderland was the Queensland Rugby League's secretary. His administration is credited with the growth of the League in Queensland despite the First World War. However towards the end of his tenure with the QRL, player discontent with his administration led to the breakaway formation of the Brisbane Rugby League. Sunderland was the team manager for the 1929–30 Kangaroo tour of Great Britain. Following development work by both Sunderland (on behalf of the Australian Rugby League) and the Rugby Football League based in England, an exhibition match between Great Britain and Australia at Paris' Stade Pershing in December 1933 inspired the beginnings of rugby league in France.

On 25 October 1938 Sunderland arrived in Wigan to take up the duties of Secretary-Manager at Central Park. On 28 September the following year, his contract was terminated and he and the club parted company.

At the start of the 1950s he submitted a plan to the Australian Rugby League Board of Control for promoting rugby league in the United States.

After moving to Melbourne, Victoria where he unsuccessfully attempted to promote rugby league, Sunderland returned north and became an administrator of the Australian national team. He later moved to England where he became manager of the Wigan Rugby League Football Club.

From his death in Chorlton upon Medlock, Manchester in 1964, until 2023, the Harry Sunderland Trophy was awarded to the man-of-the-match in the RFL First Division Final, Premiership Final, and then Super League Grand Final. In addition, the Harry Sunderland Medal was the award given to the best Australian player in each home Ashes series.

== Personal life ==
Sunderland was the father of Sir Sydney Sunderland.
