= Reg Gasnier =

Australia international rugby league footballer & coach (1939–2014)

Reg Gasnier AM
Personal information
- Full name: Reginald William Gasnier
- Born: 12 May 1939 Mortdale, New South Wales, Australia
- Died: 11 May 2014 (aged 74) Miranda, New South Wales, Australia

Playing information
- Height: 5 ft 11 in (180 cm)
- Weight: 12 st 10 lb (81 kg)
- Position: Centre
Club
Years	Team	Pld	T	G	FG	P
1959–67	St. George Dragons	125	127	20	0	421
Representative
Years	Team	Pld	T	G	FG	P
1959–67	City NSW	17	13	3	0	46
1959–67	New South Wales	16	15	0	0	45
1959–67	Australia	39	28	0	0	84

Coaching information
Representative
Years	Team	Gms	W	D	L	W%
1964	Australia	3	3	0	0	100
1967	City Firsts	2	1	0	1	50
1967–68	Australia	9	5	1	3	56
- Relatives: Mark Gasnier (nephew); Dennis Tutty (cousin); Ian Tutty (cousin)

Reginald William Gasnier AM (12 May 1939 – 11 May 2014) was an Australian rugby league footballer and coach. He played centre for the St. George Dragons from 1959 to 1967 and represented Australia in a then record 36 Tests and three World Cup games. He was the captain of the national side on eight occasions between 1962 and 1967.

Gasnier was included on the National Rugby League's list of 100 greatest players and the honorary Team of the Century. He is a member of the Sport Australia Hall of Fame and Australian Rugby League Hall of Fame. He was appointed a Member of the Order of Australia.

== Early life ==
Reginald William Gasnier was born in the Southern Sydney suburb of Mortdale on 12 May 1939. At Sutherland Intermediate High School, Gasnier excelled at both rugby and cricket. He later attended Sydney Technical High School ("Tech") in the St. George area suburb of Bexley. While at Tech, he became a champion sportsman in both rugby and cricket, achieving junior state representative honours in both sports. He went on to play rugby league for junior club Renown United.

Gasnier was selected in the NSW schoolboys side aged 13, to play in a curtain raiser to the 1952 Australia and New Zealand Third Test.

== Career ==
Gasnier has been described as the ultimate all-round rugby league player. Teammate Keith Barnes recalled: "He had everything, a body swerve, speed and acceleration. He could stand you up or run around you. There was no better sight in rugby league than when he threw his head back and left them standing." Dave Bolton, who played against Gasnier in international play remarked: "He was a great player. Along with Eric Ashton the best centre I’ve ever seen. He was very fast and very deceptive. You never knew what he would do next. He'd be running straight and then veer left or right." Upon Gasnier's retirement then ARL chairman Bill Buckley said, "[In] his day, he was the greatest rugby league player I have ever seen. Gasnier had an amazing change of pace and great anticipation. He was also particularly unselfish. He was without peer."

Gasnier was nicknamed "Puff the Magic Dragon" and the "prince of centres" for his high-quality play.

=== St. George Dragons ===
In 1957, Gasnier, aged 18, focused his attention on rugby league, signing with the local St. George Dragons for the 1958 season. After only six games in third grade, he was selected for his first grade debut, and after only five first grade games he was selected for New South Wales. He scored 15 tries in 16 games for his state team.

By 1959, Gasnier had become an established member of both the New South Wales state side and the Australian international team. He was an important member of the dominant Dragons team of the late 1950s/early 1960s that won 11 consecutive premiership victories, of which Gasnier was on the team for six. He finished his career with the Dragons in 1967, with 127 tries and 20 goals in 125 appearances and 6 premierships. Reg Gasnier is widely regarded as one of the greatest ever St. George Dragons players.

=== National team ===
In 1959, Gasnier moved up from reserve to Test team, making his international debut for Australia against New Zealand in the 1st Test of 1959 in Sydney. He played in all three Tests of that series, and went on to tour Britain with the Kangaroos. On the tour, he scored a hat trick in the 1st Test 22–14 victory against Great Britain at Swinton's Station Road (attendance 35,224). However the Ashes were retained by the home nation after wins in the remaining Tests at Headingley, Leeds (11–10, attendance 30,184) and Central Park (Wigan) (18–12, attendance 26,089). In 1960, he played in World Cup finals as a member of the national team. He is listed on the Australian Players Register as Kangaroo No. 339.

Gasnier became Australia's youngest ever captain in 1962, when he led Australia against England at 23 years and 28 days. The following season, he toured Europe as a member of the National Team for a second time. In 1967–68, he again toured Europe, this time as coach-captain of the Kangaroos. His career ended prematurely, at age 28, when he broke his leg during the first test at Headingley, Leeds, that saw him sit out the remainder of the English leg. He returned to the field in France but in a minor game against Les Espoirs in Avignon, he suffered a further break of the leg. This would ultimately cause him to announce his retirement from playing at the age of just 28. He later told in an interview that he never regretted his decision to retire, explaining that he had been playing rugby league virtually non-stop including juniors, junior representative games, the Sydney premiership, interstate games and international tours since the early 1950s, and felt it was about time that he started devoting more time to his family.

He finished his international career as Australia's most capped player, with a total of 39 caps (36 Test and 3 World Cup), a record that remained until Mal Meninga broke it in 1992. Gasnier scored 28 tries for Australia and captained the side on eight occasions.

=== Media career ===
After retiring from the playing field in 1967, Gasnier was involved in the media side of rugby league, becoming a sports writer and broadcaster. He provided expert analysis on the ABC's Grandstand television coverage during the 1970s.

== Personal life and death ==
While at Sydney Technical High School, Gasnier met his future wife Maureen (née Sullivan). The couple wed in 1962. Gasnier was the uncle of the rugby league footballer Mark Gasnier, who, like his uncle, was a centre and played for both NSW (12 games) and Australia (15 tests).

In 2010, Gasnier underwent major surgery to remove tumours from his neck and brain. On 11 May 2014, the day before his 75th birthday, he died in a Miranda nursing home after a long illness. He was survived by his wife, son Peter, daughter Kellie, and four grandchildren. Maureen died on 30 September 2016.

== Honours ==
In 1981, Gasnier was selected as one of the initial four post-war "Immortals" of the Australian game along with Clive Churchill, Johnny Raper and Bob Fulton. In December of that year, he was inducted into the Sport Australia Hall of Fame and in 2002, he was inducted into the Australian Rugby League Hall of Fame. He was appointed a Member of the Order of Australia (AM) in 1989. He was awarded the Australian Sports Medal in 2000, and the Centenary Medal in 2001.

In 1989 he was awarded Life Membership of the St. George Dragons club.

In 2007, Gasnier was selected by a panel of experts at centre in the "Team of the 50s". In February 2008, he was selected as one of Australia's 100 Greatest Players by the National Rugby League and Australian Rugby League to celebrate the code's centenary year. Gasnier was also named as one of the centres, along with Mal Meninga, in Australian rugby league's 17 player Team of the Century in April 2008. New South Wales also named Gasnier to their team of the century.

Gasnier was made a life member of the Sydney Cricket Ground, and a plaque in the Walk of Honour there commemorates his career. In 2010, a bronze statue of Gasnier was unveiled as the seventh at the grounds as part of the Basil Sellers Sports Sculpture project.

A tribute to the life of Reg Gasnier was held at Jubilee Oval, Kogarah on 5 July 2014 and was attended by over 12,000 people. Many of his former team-mates attended the hour long ceremony including three Immortals; Graeme Langlands, Wally Lewis and Johnny Raper. The late Clive Churchill was represented by his wife Joyce and the late Arthur Beetson was represented by his son Mark. Other notable former players attended including Eddie Lumsden, Johnny Riley, Johnny King, Dave Brown, Bob Bugden, Grahame Bowen, Tommy Ryan, Brian Graham and Billy Smith. The Master of Ceremonies for the occasion was noted broadcaster Ray Warren who read tributes to Reg Gasnier provided by Ian Heads, Robert Raftery and David Middleton plus historical photographs and video footage of Gasnier's career were shown to the crowd. A plaque is erected near the north western sideline of Jubilee Oval where Gasnier showed his electrifying skill and talent during his sparkling rugby league career. The plaque was unveiled by Gasnier's wife Maureen and children, Kellie and Peter. On 20 July 2022, Gasnier was named in the St. George Dragons District Rugby League Clubs team of the century at centre.
