= Clive Churchill =

Australia international rugby league footballer and coach

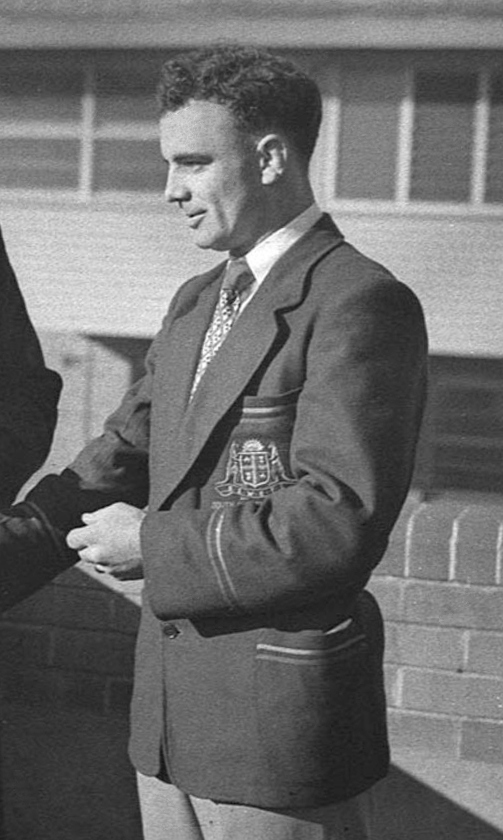
- Churchill in 1952

Personal information
- Full name: Clive Bernard Churchill
- Born: 21 January 1927 Newcastle, New South Wales, Australia
- Died: 9 August 1985 (aged 58) Sydney, New South Wales, Australia

Playing information
- Height: 175 cm (5 ft 9 in)
- Weight: 76 kg (12 st 0 lb)
- Position: Fullback
Club
Years	Team	Pld	T	G	FG	P
1946–47	Central Newcastle
1947–58	South Sydney	158	13	74	3	193
1959	Norths (Brisbane)
1961	Moree Boars
	Total	158	13	74	3	193
Representative
Years	Team	Pld	T	G	FG	P
1948–55	NSW City Firsts	8	2	3	1	14
1948–57	New South Wales	27	4	15	3	48
1948–56	Australia	38	0	9	1	20
1951	Sydney Firsts	1	0	0	0	0
1959	Queensland	1	0	0	0	0

Coaching information
Club
Years	Team	Gms	W	D	L	W%
1958	South Sydney	18	6	0	12	33
1959	Northern Suburbs	21	15	0	6	71
1963–64	Canterbury-Bankstown	36	7	2	27	19
1967–75	South Sydney	211	136	3	72	64
	Total	286	164	5	117	57
Representative
Years	Team	Gms	W	D	L	W%
1952–63	Australia	29	15	1	13	52
1959	Queensland	3	2	0	1	67

Clive Bernard Churchill AM (21 January 1927 – 9 August 1985) was an Australian professional rugby league footballer and coach in the mid-20th century. An Australian international and New South Wales and Queensland interstate representative fullback, he played the majority of his club football with and later coached the South Sydney Rabbitohs. He won five premierships with the club as a player and three more as coach. Retiring as the most capped Australian Kangaroos player ever, Churchill is thus considered one of the game's greatest ever players and the prestigious Clive Churchill Medal for man-of-the-match in the NRL grand final bears his name. Churchill's attacking flair as a player is credited with having changed the role of the fullback.

== Background ==
Clive Churchill was born in Newcastle, New South Wales, and was a star schoolboy five-eighth at Marist Brothers, Hamilton, where he won five premierships while at school. The brothers at his school banned him from playing with Central Newcastle juniors and as a result he only appeared for them a handful of times.

== Playing career ==
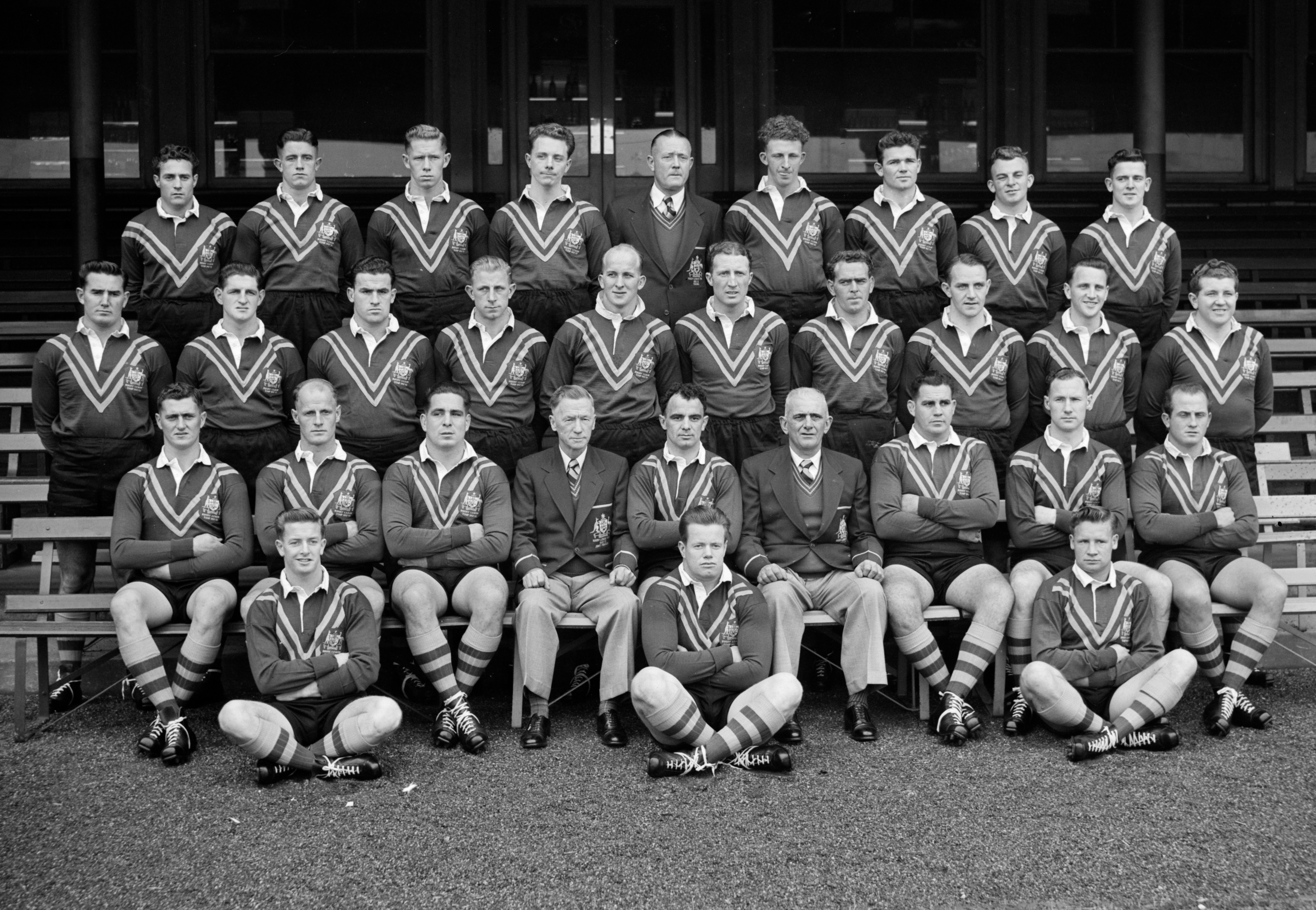
Australian Kangaroos Rugby League team, 1952

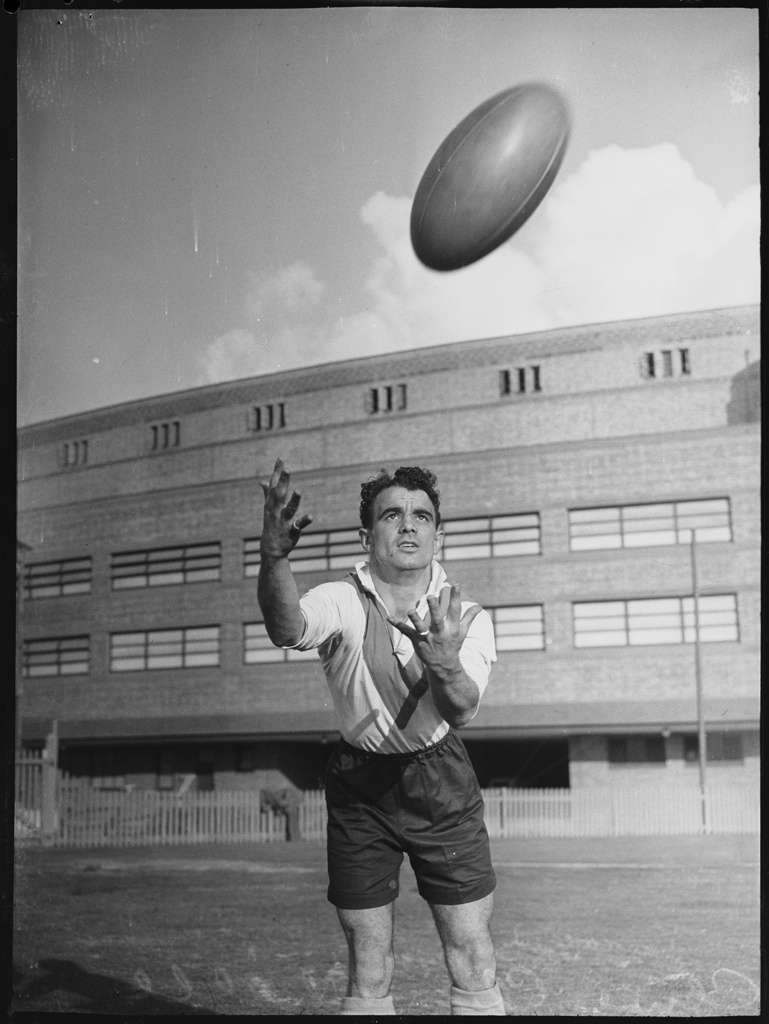
Clive Churchill during football practice against England, 1 June 1954

In 1946 Churchill was graded with Central in the Newcastle Rugby League competition as a fullback. He represented for Country Seconds in 1946 and came to the attention of Sydney talent scouts. He was signed to South Sydney by their patron Dave Spring and moved to Sydney at the start of the 1947 season. Like many top Australian players, Churchill attracted the attention of English clubs, and was signed by Workington Town for £10,000. However, an international transfer ban imposed by the ARL in 1948 meant Churchill had to stay in Sydney.

Under captain-coach Jack Rayner, South Sydney reached the 1949 season's grand final against St. George and Churchill played at fullback in the Rabbitohs' loss. Souths reached the grand final again the following season, this time against Western Suburbs, and Churchill played fullback in the Rabbitohs' victory.

Nicknamed "The Little Master" Churchill was selected to captain Sydney's representative team when they hosted France during the 1951 French rugby league tour of Australia and New Zealand. The match ended in a 19–all draw. At the end of the 1951 season South Sydney reached their third consecutive grand final, this time against Manly-Warringah and Churchill played at fullback, scoring a try in the Rabbitohs' second consecutive victory. Churchill missed South Sydney's fourth consecutive grand final in 1952 as he was away on the Kangaroo tour to England.

South Sydney reached the 1953 season's premiership final, their fifth in succession, and Churchill played at fullback, kicking a goal in the Rabbitohs' victory over St. George. Souths won the 1953 premiership without the need to play a grand final, but this would be the last time such an outcome was possible with the mandating of a grand final to determine the premiership from the following season onward.

At the 1954 Rugby League World Cup, the first ever rugby football world cup, Churchill captained the Australian team, however they failed to reach the final. He would play for the Rabbitohs as they defeated Newtown 23–15 in the first mandatory grand final in 1954. Churchill played Souths' second last regular game of the 1955 season against Manly with a broken arm, winning the game with a successful sideline conversion kicked after the full-time bell with his broken arm wrapped in cardboard. However he was forced to miss the finals in 1955 due to injury.

Churchill played his final Test for Australia on the 1956–57 Kangaroo tour. He captained South Sydney in 1957 and captained-coached them in 1958, which would prove his last season playing for the Rabbitohs. Churchill spent twelve seasons at Redfern, playing 164 games and winning five premierships: 1950, 1951, 1953, 1954 and 1955.

In 1959 Churchill captain-coached Brisbane Rugby League club Norths to a premiership, and was also selected as captain-coach for the Queensland team. He retired from playing at the end of that season, but in 1961 he played a swansong season in the northwestern town of Moree, New South Wales. Churchill had played 34 Tests for Australia and the 1954 World Cup series. He captained Australia in 24 Test matches over a period of six years which including three series against Great Britain. He also played 37 games for New South Wales the standing record for most games by a player for the state.

== Coaching career ==
Churchill was appointed non-playing coach of the Australia national team for their 1959–60 Kangaroo tour. On the tour the Australians lost the Ashes series to Great Britain but won both test matches against France.

Churchill commenced his NSWRFL Premiership coaching career with Canterbury-Bankstown in 1963. The club finished with the wooden spoon the following season, winning only one game for the worst record in the NSWRFL since the 1946 Rabbitohs lost every game, and Churchill was replaced by former coach Eddie Burns.

In 1967 Churchill was appointed coach of South Sydney. He had immediate success, Souths winning the premiership in his inaugural year as coach. He steered the South Sydney club to four premiership victories out of five grand final appearances between 1967 and 1971. Churchill resigned as coach of South Sydney during the 1975 season.

Churchill also had success in coaching the Queensland and Australian teams. Churchill was also commemorated as one of Australia's most successful coaches.

== Accolades ==
On 10 June 1985, Churchill was honoured as a Member of the Order of Australia "in recognition of service to sport, particularly Rugby League Football and to the community". Also that year he was selected by the respected publication Rugby League Week as one of the initial four post-war "Immortals" of the Australian game alongside Fulton, Raper and Gasnier.

In 1986, the newly built Clive Churchill Stand at the Sydney Cricket Ground was named in his honour. He is one of six sportsmen and only two rugby league players to have a stand at the SCG named after him. The Clive Churchill Medal has, since 1986, been awarded annually to the player judged best on ground in the season's Grand Final. A plaque in the Walk of Honour at the Sydney Cricket Ground commemorates his career as not only a great player but as an all-time great coach.

In 2002, Churchill was inducted into the Australian Rugby League Hall of Fame and was later named in the South Sydney team of the Century.

In 2007, Churchill was selected by a panel of experts at fullback in an Australian 'Team of the 50s'.

In February 2008, Churchill was named in the list of Australia's 100 Greatest Players (1908–2007) which was commissioned by the NRL and ARL to celebrate the code's centenary year in Australia. Churchill went on to be named as fullback in Australian rugby league's Team of the Century. Announced on 17 April 2008, the team is the panel's majority choice for each of the thirteen starting positions and four interchange players.

== See also ==
- Clive Churchill Medal

Sporting positions
Preceded by Keith Froome	(Australia); Australia; Captain; 1950-54	Succeeded by Ken Kearney
