= Australian Rugby League's Team of the Century =

Best all-time Australian players at each rugby position, 1908–2008

In late 2007, the Australian Rugby League and National Rugby League commissioned a college of 130 experts to select the 100 best rugby league players in the game's 100-year history in Australia. The list was released in February 2008.

From this list a "Team of the Century" was selected – a team of 17 Australian players considered to be the best of all time in each position (plus four interchange/reserves and a coach). This illustrious line-up was announced in Sydney on 17 April 2008.

Team of the Century
| No. | Name | Position | Clubs | State | Era | Highest representative honours |
|---|---|---|---|---|---|---|
| 1. | Clive Churchill | Fullback | Central Newcastle, South Sydney, Brisbane Norths | NSW | 1946–61 | 37 Test & World Cup matches 24 as captain |
| 2. | Brian Bevan | Wing | Eastern Suburbs, Warrington, Blackpool Borough | NSW | 1942-1964 | 16 matches for Other Nationalities |
| 3. | Reg Gasnier | Centre | St George | NSW | 1957–69 | 39 Test & World Cup matches 8 as captain |
| 4. | Mal Meninga | Centre | Souths Brisbane, St. Helens, Canberra Raiders | QLD | 1978–94 | 46 Test & World Cup matches 23 as captain |
| 5. | Ken Irvine | Wing | North Sydney, Manly-Warringah | NSW | 1958–73 | 35 Test matches |
| 6. | Wally Lewis | Five-eighth | Brisbane Valleys, Wakefield Trinity, Wynnum-Manly, Brisbane Broncos, Gold Coast Seagulls | QLD | 1978–92 | 34 Test & World Cup matches 24 as captain |
| 7. | Andrew Johns | Halfback | Newcastle, Warrington | NSW | 1993–2007 | 27 Test & World Cup matches 2 as captain |
| 8. | Arthur Beetson | Prop | Roma Cities, Redcliffe, Balmain, Eastern Suburbs, Parramatta, Hull Kingston Rovers | QLD | 1963–80 | 28 Test & World Cup matches 8 as captain |
| 9. | Noel Kelly | Hooker | Ipswich Brothers, Ayr; Western Suburbs, Wollongong | QLD | 1958–70 | 25 Test & World Cup matches |
| 10. | Duncan Hall | Prop | Brisbane Valleys, Newtown Toowoomba; Home Hill, Brisbane Wests | QLD | 1948–57 | 22 Test matches |
| 11. | Norm Provan | Second-row | St George | NSW | 1951–65 | 25 Test & World Cup matches |
| 12. | Ron Coote | Second-row | South Sydney, Eastern Suburbs | NSW | 1964–78 | 23 Test & World Cup matches 3 as captain |
| 13. | Johnny Raper | Lock | Newtown, St George, Wests Newcastle, Kurri Kurri | NSW | 1957–69 | 39 Test & World Cup matches 8 as captain |
| 14. | Graeme Langlands | Interchange | Wollongong, St George | NSW | 1959–76 | 45 Test & World Cup matches 15 as captain |
| 15. | Dally Messenger | Interchange | Eastern Suburbs | NSW | 1908–13 | 7 Test matches 3 as captain |
| 16. | Bob Fulton | Interchange | Wests Wollongong, Manly-Warringah, Eastern Suburbs | NSW | 1966–79 | 35 Test & World Cup matches 7 as captain |
| 17. | Frank Burge | Interchange | Glebe, Grenfell, St George | NSW | 1911–27 | 13 Test matches |
| – | Jack Gibson | Coach | Eastern Suburbs, St George, Newtown; South Sydney, Parramatta, Cronulla-Sutherland | NSW | 1967–87 | 6 State of Origin matches |

== See also ==
- Australian rugby league's 100 greatest players
- List of Australia national rugby league team players
