= 1967–68 Kangaroo tour of Great Britain and France =

Rugby league tour (1967–1968)

- Manager: Jack Drewes; Harry Schmidt
- Coach(es): Reg Gasnier
- Tour captain(s): Reg Gasnier; Johnny Raper
- Top point scorer(s): Graeme Langlands 101
- Top try scorer(s): Brian Moore 10
- Top test point scorer(s): Graeme Langlands 31
- Top test try scorer(s): Johnny Greaves 3 Graeme Langlands 3
Summary
P	W	D	L
Total
27	16	2	9
Test match
6	2	1	3
Opponent
P	W	D	L
Great Britain
3	2	0	1
France
3	0	1	2

Tour chronology
- Previous tour: 1963-64
- Next tour: 1973

The 1967–68 Kangaroo tour of Great Britain and France was the twelfth Kangaroo Tour, and saw the Australian national rugby league team travel to Europe and play twenty-one matches against British and French club and representative rugby league teams, in addition to three Test matches against Great Britain and three Tests against the French. It followed the tour of 1963-64 and the next was staged in 1973.

== Squad leadership ==
The team was captain-coached by Reg Gasnier making his third and ultimately final Kangaroo Tour. Gasnier broke his leg during the first test at Headingley and sat out the remainder of the English leg. He returned to the field in France, but in a minor game against Les Espoirs in Avignon, he suffered a further break. This would ultimately cause him to announce his retirement from playing at the age of 28. He later said in an interview that he never regretted his decision to retire, saying that he had been playing rugby league virtually non-stop including juniors, junior representative games, the Sydney premiership, interstate games and international tours since the early 1950s, and wanted to devote more time to his family.

Having led the team in four tour matches in England, Johnny Raper was appointed captain for the Third Test Match against Great Britain. Raper captained the side in each of the three Test Matches in France.

Peter Gallagher led the team in three successive matches in England, culminating in the Second Test Match against Great Britain. He also was captain against Barrow, Bradford Northern and France B.

Noel Kelly captained the Kangaroos in five matches, against Cumbria, Oldham, Widnes, Swinton and Pyrenees. Graeme Langlands led the team in two matches (Castleford and Catalans). Elton Rasmussen was captain in one match, against St Helens.

The Kangaroo tourists were co-managed by Jack Drewes (New South Wales) and Harry Schmidt (Queensland). Alf Richards accompanied the team as masseur.

== Touring squad ==
Match details - listing surnames of both teams and the point scorers - were included in E.E. Christensen's Official Rugby League Yearbook, as was a summary of the players' point-scoring, along with each player's age, height and weight.
The Rugby League News published a summary of the Kangaroos' point scorers.

Noel Gallagher, Peter Gallagher, John Gleeson, Dennis Manteit and John McDonald were selected from Queensland clubs. Tony Branson and Allan Thomson were selected from clubs in New South Wales Country areas. The balance of the squad had played for Sydney based clubs during the 1967 season.

Player	Position	Age	Weight st.lb (kg)	Club	Tests on Tour	Games	Tries	Goals	FG	Points
Tony Branson	Five-eighth	20	12.12 (82)	Nowra	5	17	3	0	0	9
Ron Coote	Lock, Second-row	22	13.7 (86)	South Sydney	5	18	7	0	0	21
Noel Gallagher	Hooker	22	14.7 (92)	Bundaberg	2	14	0	0	0	0
Peter Gallagher (vc)	Prop	30	15.10 (100)	Brisbane Brothers	6	16	1	0	0	3
Reg Gasnier (ca/co)	Centre	28	12.12 (82)	St George	2	6	1	0	0	3
John Gleeson	Five-eighth, Halfback	24	11.12 (75)	Brisbane Brothers	3	11	2	0	1	8
Kevin Goldspink	Second-row	24	15.0 (95)	Canterbury	0	13	2	0	0	6
Johnny Greaves	Wing, Centre	24	13.7 (86)	Canterbury	5	14	6	0	0	18
Les Hanigan	Wing, Centre	22	11.4 (72)	Manly-Warringah	0	11	6	0	0	18
Ken Irvine	Wing	27	11.12 (75)	North Sydney	1	14	8	5	0	34
Les Johns	Fullback	25	11.12 (75)	Canterbury	6	16	2	4	3	20
Kevin Junee	Halfback	23	11.8 (73)	Eastern Suburbs	0	10	4	0	1	14
Noel Kelly	Prop, Hooker	30	14.2 (90)	Western Suburbs	5	17	0	0	0	0
Johnny King	Wing	24	12.6 (79)	St George	6	18	9	0	0	27
Graeme Langlands	Fullback, Centre	25	13.0 (83)	St George	6	19	5	43	0	101
Ron Lynch	Lock, Second-row	27	14.6 (92)	Parramatta	4	15	2	0	0	6
Dennis Manteit	Prop, Second-row	24	14.7 (92)	Brisbane Brothers	3	14	4	0	0	12
John McDonald	Wing, Centre	23	12.10 (81)	Toowoomba Valleys	5	17	5	13	0	41
Brian Moore	Centre	23	14.12 (94)	Newtown	0	11	10	0	0	30
Johnny Raper (vc)	Lock	28	13.9 (87)	St George	5	12	0	0	0	0
Elton Rasmussen	Prop, Second-row	29	15.4 (97)	St George	6	18	0	0	0	0
Ron Saddler	Wing, Centre	25	13.6 (85)	Eastern Suburbs	0	12	0	0	0	0
John Sattler	Prop	24	14.8 (93)	South Sydney	0	9	0	0	0	0
Billy Smith	Halfback	24	11.7 (73)	St George	5	15	3	0	3	15
Allan Thomson	Second-row	24	14.3 (90)	Lakes United	1	14	2	0	0	6
Elwyn Walters	Hooker	23	13.11 (88)	South Sydney	0	8	2	0	0	6

== Great Britain ==
The Ashes series against Great Britain saw an aggregate crowd of 53,353 attending the Test series. The largest attendance of the tour came during the Kangaroos 6-12 loss to Wigan in front of 22,770 fans at Central Park on 13 October.

=== Test Venues ===
The three Ashes series tests took place at the following venues.

Leeds	London	Swinton
Headingley	White City Stadium	Station Road
Capacity: 30,000	Capacity: 50,000	Capacity: 40,000

Saturday, 30 September	Warrington	7 – 16	Australia	Wilderspool, Warrington
		[ Report]		Attendance: 11,642

Wednesday, 4 October	Yorkshire	15 – 14	Australia	Belle Vue, Wakefield
		[ Report]		Attendance: 19,370; Referee: D. Brown

Saturday, 7 October	Hull Kingston Rovers	27 – 15	Australia	Craven Park, Hull
		[ Report]		Attendance: 11,252

Wednesday, 11 October	Lancashire	2 – 14	Australia	The Willows, Salford
		[ Report]		Attendance: 9,369; Referee: R. Appleyard

Friday, 13 October	Wigan	12 – 6	Australia	Central Park, Wigan
		[ Report]		Attendance: 22,770

Monday, 16 October	Rochdale Hornets	2 – 25	Australia	Athletic Grounds, Rochdale
		[ Report]		Attendance: 2,676

=== The Ashes series ===
==== First Test ====
The first Ashes series test was played at Headingley, Leeds. Kangaroos captain-coach Reg Gasnier suffered a broken leg which would keep him out of the rest of the English leg of the tour while lock forward Johnny Raper would play most of the game with a fractured cheek bone.

Saturday 21 October

Great Britain	16 – 11	Australia
Tries: Roger Millward; Chris Young; Goals: Roger Millward (3); Bill Holliday (1); Drop Goals: Tommy Bishop		Tries: Graeme Langlands Goals: Graeme Langlands (4)

Headingley, Leeds
Attendance: 22,293
Referee: Fred Lindop (England)

Great Britain	Australia

FB	1	Arthur Keegan
RW	2	Chris Young
CE	3	Ian Brooke
CE	4	Malcolm Price
LW	5	Bill Burgess
SO	6	Roger Millward
SH	7	Tommy Bishop
PR	8	Bill Holliday (c)
HK	9	Peter Flanagan
PR	10	Cliff Watson
SR	11	John Mantle
SR	12	Bob Irving
LF	13	Dave Robinson
Substitutions:
IC	14	G. Jordan
IC	15	G. Rees
Coach:

FB	2	Les Johns
RW	8	John McDonald
CE	1	Graeme Langlands
CE	7	Reg Gasnier (c)
LW	4	Johnny King
FE	11	John Gleeson
HB	13	Billy Smith
PR	23	Dennis Manteit
HK	22	Noel Kelly
PR	21	Peter Gallagher
SR	17	Ron Lynch
SR	19	Elton Rasmussen
LK	15	Johnny Raper
Substitutions:
IC		Tony Branson
IC		Elwyn Walters
Coach:
(Australia) Reg Gasnier

Tuesday, 24 October	St. Helens	8 – 4	Australia	Knowsley Road, St. Helens
		[ Report]		Attendance: 17,275

Saturday, 28 October	Wakefield Trinity	7 – 33	Australia	Belle Vue, Wakefield
		[ Report]		Attendance: 10,056

==== Second Test ====
The second test at London's White City Stadium saw the Australian's tie the series at one game all with a 17-11 win in front of 17,445 fans.

Friday 3 November

Great Britain	11 – 17	Australia
Tries: Tommy Bishop Goals: Neil Fox (3); Field Goals: Tommy Bishop		Tries: Ron Coote; Johnny King; Graeme Langlands; Goals: Graeme Langlands (4)

White City Stadium, London
Attendance: 17,445
Referee: Fred Lindop (England)

Great Britain	Australia

FB	1	Arthur Keegan
RW	2	Chris Young
CE	3	Ian Brooke
CE	4	Neil Fox
LW	5	Bill Francis
SO	6	Roger Millward
SH	7	Tommy Bishop
PR	8	Bill Holliday (c)
HK	9	Peter Flanagan
PR	10	Cliff Watson
SR	11	John Mantle
SR	12	Bob Irving
LF	13	Frank Foster
Substitutions:
IC	14
IC	15
Coach:

FB	2	Les Johns
RW	6	Johnny Greaves
CE	1	Graeme Langlands
CE	8	John McDonald
LW	4	Johnny King
FE	12	Tony Branson
HB	11	John Gleeson
PR	22	Noel Kelly
HK	25	Noel Gallagher
PR	21	Peter Gallagher (c)
SR	17	Ron Lynch
SR	19	Elton Rasmussen
LK	16	Ron Coote
Substitutions:
IC	14
IC	15
Coach:
(Australia) Reg Gasnier

Thursday, 9 November	Castleford	22 – 3	Australia	Wheldon Road, Castleford
		[ Report]		Attendance: 6,137

Saturday, 11 November	Oldham	8 – 18	Australia	Watersheddings, Oldham
		[ Report]		Attendance: 3,174

Monday, 13 November	Widnes	11 – 33	Australia	Naughton Park, Widnes
		[ Report]		Attendance: 9,828

Thursday, 16 November	Barrow	10 – 10	Australia	Craven Park, Barrow
		[ Report]		Attendance: 8,418

Saturday, 18 November	Cumberland (Cumbria)	17 – 15	Australia	Derwent Park, Workington
		[ Report]		Attendance: 7,545; Referee: J. Hebblethwaite

Wednesday, 22 November	Swinton	9 – 12	Australia	Station Road, Swinton
		[ Report]		Attendance: 5,640

Saturday, 25 November	Leeds	4 – 7	Australia	Headingley, Leeds
		[ Report]		Attendance: 5,522

Wednesday, 29 November	Halifax	2 – 22	Australia	Thrum Hall, Halifax
		[ Report]		Attendance: 5,285

Saturday, 2 December	Bradford Northern	3 – 7	Australia	Odsal, Bradford
		[ Report]		Attendance: 14,173

==== Third Test ====
The Kangaroos retained The Ashes with a hard-fought 11-3 win on a frozen ground at Station Road in Swinton. It would be the 10th and last time Station Road would host an Ashes Test and the 18th and last test match played at the ground.

Saturday 9 December

Great Britain	3 – 11	Australia
Tries: Malcolm Price Goals:		Tries: Tony Branson; Ron Coote; Johnny King; Goals: Graeme Langlands (1)

Station Road, Swinton
Attendance: 13,615
Referee: Fred Lindop (England)
Player of the Match: Johnny Raper

Great Britain	Australia

FB	1	Arthur Keegan
RW	2	Chris Young
CE	3	Ian Brooke
CE	4	Malcolm Price
LW	5	Gary Jordan
SO	6	Roger Millward
SH	7	Tommy Bishop
PR	8	Bill Holliday (c)
HK	9	Peter Flanagan
PR	10	Cliff Watson
SR	11	Bob Irving
SR	12	Bob Valentine
LF	13	Dave Robinson
Substitutions:
IC	14	Alan Burwell
IC	15	Charlie Renilson
Coach:

FB	2	Les Johns
LW	4	Johnny King
CE	6	Johnny Greaves
CE	1	Graeme Langlands
RW	8	John McDonald
FE	11	John Gleeson
HB	13	Billy Smith
PR	21	Peter Gallagher
HK	22	Noel Kelly
PR	23	Dennis Manteit
SR	19	Elton Rasmussen
SR	16	Ron Coote
LF	15	Johnny Raper (c)
Substitutions:
IC	12	Tony Branson
IC	15
Coach:
(Australia) Reg Gasnier

According to stand-in Kangaroos captain and man of the match Johnny Raper, the Kangaroos had a psychological advantage in the third test after he heard Lions halves Roger Millward and Tommy Bishop say after walking around the Station Road ground pre-match that they did not want to play on the frozen ground. The Kangaroos, used to playing on hard Australian grounds, were in their element against a timid Lions outfit.

== France ==
During the game against Les Espoirs in Avignon, Kangaroos captain coach Reg Gasnier re-broke the leg he had broken during the first Ashes Test at Headingley. Ultimately this would prove to be Gasnier's last game of top grade football and he subsequently announced his retirement from playing at the age of 28.

Date	Opponent	Score	Ground	Referee	Crowd	Report
17 December 1967	France	7 – 7	Stade Vélodrome, Marseille	G. Jameau (FRA)	5,193	
21 December 1967	Les Espoirs (Colts)	7 – 17	Parc des Sports, Avignon		1,116	
24 December 1967	France	10 – 3	Stade Albert Domec, Carcassonne	A. Breysse (FRA)	4,193	
21 December 1967	XIII Catalan	7 – 37	Stade Jean-Laffon, Perpignan		3,000	
31 December 1967	France XIII	6 – 13	Stade Municipal d'Albi, Albi		2,949	
4 January 1968	South West France	0 – 15	Stade Jules Ribet, Saint-Gaudens		1,205	
7 January 1968	France	16 – 13	Stade des Minimes, Toulouse	G. Jameau (FRA)	5,000	

=== First test ===
17 December 1967

France	7 – 7	Australia
Tries: Georges Bonet; Goals; Andre Lacaze (2)		Tries: Les Johns; Goals; Les Johns (1); Graeme Langlands (1)

Stade Vélodrome, Marseille
Attendance: 5,193
Referee: Georges Jameau (France)

France	Position	Australia
André Lacaze	FB	Les Johns
Daniel Pellerin	WG	Johnny King
Guy Andrieu	CE	Graeme Langlands
Jean-Pierre Lecompte	CE	Johnny Greaves
Yves Raynaud	WG	Ken Irvine
Claude Mantoulan	SO	Tony Branson
Roger Garnung	SH	Billy Smith
Christian Sabatié	PR	Dennis Manteit
Yves Bégou	HK	Noel Kelly
Guy Ribot	PR	Peter Gallagher
Georges Ailleres (c)	SR	Elton Rasmussen
Adolphe Alésina	SR	Ron Coote
Georges Bonet	LF	Johnny Raper (c)
Jean Capdouze	Int.	Ron Lynch
Jep Lacoste	Coach	Reg Gasnier

Legendary Australian winger Ken Irvine broke his leg during this game. It was to be his 33rd and final test appearance for the Kangaroos.

=== Second Test ===
24 December 1967

France	10 – 3	Australia
Tries: Goals; Jean Capdouze (5)		Tries: Johnny Greaves; Goals

Stade Albert Domec, Carcassonne
Attendance: 4,193
Referee: Andre Breysse (France)

France	Position	Australia
André Lacaze	FB	Les Johns
Daniel Pellerin	WG	Johnny King
Guy Andrieu	CE	Johnny Greaves
Roger Garrigue	CE	Graeme Langlands
Pierre Surre	WG	John McDonald
Jean Capdouze	SO	Tony Branson
Roger Garnung	SH	Billy Smith
Christian Sabatié	PR	Peter Gallagher
Yves Bégou	HK	Noel Gallagher
Pierre Dubié	PR	Elton Rasmussen
Georges Ailleres (c)	SR	Ron Lynch
Francis de Nadaï	SR	Ron Coote
Georges Bonet	LF	Johnny Raper (c)
Jacques Fabre	Int.
Adolphe Alésina	Int.
Jep Lacoste	Coach	Reg Gasnier

=== Third Test ===
7 January 1968

France	16 – 13	Australia
Tries: Daniel Pellerin; P Surre; Goals; Jean Capdouze (5)		Tries: Johnny Greaves (2); Graeme Langlands; Goals; Les Johns (1); Graeme Langlands (1)

Stade des Minimes, Toulouse
Attendance: 5,000
Referee: Georges Jameau (France)

France	Position	Australia
Claude Mantoulan	FB	Les Johns
Pierre Surre	WG	Johnny King
Michel Molinier	CE	Johnny Greaves
Guy Andrieu	CE	Graeme Langlands
Daniel Pellerin	WG	John McDonald
Jean Capdouze	SO	Tony Branson
Roger Garnung	SH	Billy Smith
Christian Sabatié	PR	Peter Gallagher
Yves Bégou	HK	Noel Kelly
Pierre Dubié	PR	Elton Rasmussen
Francis de Nadaï	SR	Allan Thomson
Georges Ailleres (c)	SR	Ron Coote
Georges Bonet	LF	Johnny Raper (c)
Jep Lacoste	Coach	Reg Gasnier
