= Adolphe Alésina =

Adolphe Alésina may refer to:

- Adolphe Alésina (rugby league, born 1943), French rugby league lock forward
- Adolphe Alésina (rugby league, born 1969), French rugby league centre and son of the player born 1943
