= Christian Sabatié =

French rugby league player (born 1941)

Personal information
- Born: 20 June 1941 (age 85) Allez-et-Cazeneuve, Lot-et-Garonne, Aquitaine, France
- Height: 5 ft 8 in (1.73 m)
- Weight: 14 st 0 lb (89 kg)

Playing information
- Position: Prop
Club
Years	Team	Pld	T	G	FG	P
19??–??	Villeneuve XIII RLLG
Representative
Years	Team	Pld	T	G	FG	P
1964–72	France	29	1	0	0	3
- Source: As of 14 February 2021
- Relatives: Pierre Sabatié (son)

Christian Sabatié (born 20 June 1941) is a French former rugby league footballer who played in the 1960s and 1970s, as a prop.

== Background ==
Christian Sabatié was born in Allez-et-Cazeneuve, France. His son, Pierre Sabatié, is also a former French rugby league international.

== Playing career ==
He played for Villeneuve-sur-Lot, with which he won a historic treble. He also was called up for France national team, with which he played the 1968 Rugby League World Cup final lost against Australia. Outside the sport, he worked as a mechanic.

== Honours ==
- Rugby league :
- World Cup :
  - 1 time runner-up in 1968 (France).
- French Championship :
  - 1-time winner in 1964 (Villeneuve-sur-Lot).
  - 2 times finalist in 1962 and 1965 (Villeneuve-sur-Lot).
- Lord Derby Cup :
  - 5 times finalist in 1964, 1966, 1969, 1970 and 1972 (Villeneuve-sur-Lot).

=== International caps ===
==== Cap details ====
Christian Sabatié international matches
Cap	Date	Venue	Opponent	Result	Competition	Position	Points	Tries	Pen	Drops
playing for France
1	25 Jul 1964	Auckland, New Zealand	New Zealand	16-24	1964 Les Chanticleers Tour	Hooker	-	-	-	-
2	1 Aug 1964	Christchurch, New Zealand	New Zealand	8-18	1964 Les Chanticleers Tour	Hooker	-	-	-	-
3	15 Nov 1965	Marseille, France	New Zealand	14-3	1965 Kiwis Tour	Prop	-	-	-	-
4	28 Nov 1965	Perpignan, France	New Zealand	6-2	1965 Kiwis Tour	Prop	-	-	-	-
5	12 Dec 1965	Toulouse, France	New Zealand	28-5	1965 Kiwis Tour	Prop	-	-	-	-
6	16 Jan 1966	Perpignan, France	(United Kingdom) Great Britain	18-13	Friendly	Prop	-	-	-	-
7	17 Dec 1967	Marseille, France	Australia	7-7	1967-68 Kangaroos Tour	Prop	-	-	-	-
8	24 Dec 1967	Carcassonne, France	Australia	10-3	1967-68 Kangaroos Tour	Prop	-	-	-	-
9	7 Jan 1968	Toulouse, France	Australia	16-13	1967-68 Kangaroos Tour	Prop	-	-	-	-
10	11 Feb 1968	Paris, France	(United Kingdom) Great Britain	13-22	Friendly	Prop	3	1	-	-
11	2 Mar 1968	Bradford, United Kingdom	(United Kingdom) Great Britain	8-19	Friendly	Prop	-	-	-	-
12	25 May 1968	Auckland, New Zealand	New Zealand	15-10	1968 World Cup	Prop	-	-	-	-
13	2 Jun 1968	Brisbane, Australia	(United Kingdom) Great Britain	7-2	1968 World Cup	Prop	-	-	-	-
14	8 Jun 1968	Brisbane, Australia	Australia	4-37	1968 World Cup	Prop	-	-	-	-
15	10 Jun 1968	Sydney, Australia	Australia	2-20	1968 World Cup	Prop	-	-	-	-
16	23 Oct 1969	Salford, United Kingdom	Wales	8-2	1969/70 European Cup	Prop	-	-	-	-
17	25 Oct 1969	Wigan, United Kingdom	England	11-11	1969/70 European Cup	Interchange bench	-	-	-	-
18	25 Jan 1970	Wigan, United Kingdom	Wales	11-15	1969/70 European Cup	Prop	-	-	-	-
19	15 Mar 1970	Toulouse, France	England	14-9	1969/70 European Cup	Prop	-	-	-	-
20	25 Oct 1970	Hull, England	New Zealand	15-16	1970 World Cup	Prop	-	-	-	-
21	28 Oct 1970	Castleford, England	(United Kingdom) Great Britain	0-6	1970 World Cup	Prop	-	-	-	-
22	1 Nov 1970	Bradford, England	Australia	17-15	1970 World Cup	Prop	-	-	-	-
23	12 Nov 1970	Perpignan, France	Australia	4-7	1970 Kangaroo Tour	Prop	-	-	-	-
24	15 Nov 1970	Carcassonne, France	New Zealand	16-2	1970 Kiwis Tour	Prop	-	-	-	-
25	7 Feb 1971	Toulouse, France	(United Kingdom) Great Britain	16-8	Friendly	Prop	-	-	-	-
26	17 Mar 1971	St Helens, United Kingdom	(United Kingdom) Great Britain	2-24	Friendly	Prop	-	-	-	-
27	11 Nov 1971	Perpignan, France	New Zealand	11-27	1971 Kiwis Tour	Prop	-	-	-	-
28	6 Feb 1972	Toulouse, France	(United Kingdom) Great Britain	9-10	Friendly	Prop	-	-	-	-
29	17 Mar 1972	Bradford, England	(United Kingdom) Great Britain	10-45	Friendly	Hooker	-	-	-	-
