= 2002 Great Britain women's rugby league tour of Australia =

- Manager: Andrew MacDonald and Roland Davis
- Coach(es): Jackie Sheldon
- Tour captain(s): Brenda Dobek and Lisa McIntosh
- Top point scorer(s): Gemma Walsh 26
- Top try scorer(s): Teresa Bruce 5
- Top test point scorer(s): Sally Milburn 16
- Top test try scorer(s): Sally Milburn 4
Summary
P	W	D	L
Total
5	3	0	2
Test match
3	1	0	2
Opponent
P	W	D	L
Australia
3	1	0	2

Tour chronology
- Previous tour: 1998

The Great Britain women's rugby league tour of Australia was their second tour to Australia, following on from a two to one test series victory in 1996. It was also their third overall, having visited New Zealand in 1998. The tour was the fourth by a national women's rugby league team into Australia, with visits by New Zealand in 1995 and 1999 in addition to Great Britain's 1996 tour. Three of the five matches were full internationals.

== Background ==
Great Britain entered into this tour with a record of four wins from five matches against Australia, having won the 1996 three-match series by two to one, and both matches played in the 2000 World Cup.

Australia had played one match since the 2000 World Cup, a loss to New Zealand in Auckland. The team would be selected from small club competitions in two centres – Brisbane and Canberra. The Sydney club competition of the 1990s had collapsed by 2001, with a twelve-team rugby union competition cited as one reason for the decline in playing numbers.

Players from both sides were obligated to self-fund their travel and accommodation expenses for the tour, and several engaged in fund raising activities. Great Britain players were asked to find £1,000 in sponsorship as well as raising or making an individual contribution of £1,300. Collectively, the squad raised over £60,000.

== Great Britain squad ==
An extended squad of 34 players met for a training camp on the weekend of 8 and 9 December 2001. The final Great Britain squad of 25 players went into camp prior to departing London on Sunday, 7 July 2002. The team arrived in Sydney on Tuesday, 9 July ahead of their first match, the First Test.

=== Team leadership ===
Great Britain was led by joint captains Brenda Dobek and Lisa McIntosh, and by coach Jackie Sheldon. In the absence of the joint-captains in the tour game against Queensland, Gemma Walsh was captain. Support staff included assistant coaches John Mitchell (Bradford Thunderbirds) and Dylan Reynard (Milford Storm), physiotherapist Elaine Kirton (Whitehaven), and managers Andrew McDonald (Keighley Albion Cats) and Roland Davis.

=== Player’s tour record ===
J#	Player	Position(s)	Club	H#	Test Matches						Tour Matches
J#	Player	Position(s)	Club	H#	Debut	M	T	G	D	P	M	T	G	D	P
23	Samantha Bailey	Loose forward	Sheffield	40	2000	0	0	0	0	0	2	3	0	0	12
11	Jane Banks	Second-row	Bradford Thunderbirds	17	1998	3	1	0	0	4	3	1	0	0	4
19	Nicola Benstead	Wing	Hull Dockers	53	2003	0	0	0	0	0	2	1	0	0	4
1	Teresa Bruce	Fullback, Wing, Second-row	Bradford Thunderbirds	27	1998	3	0	0	0	0	5	5	0	0	20
15	Sue Cochrane	Prop	Wakefield Townville Panthers	47	2000	2	0	0	0	0	4	0	0	0	0
6	Brenda Dobek	Stand-off	Wakefield Townville Panthers	6	1996	3	0	4	1	9	3	0	4	1	9
25	Rebecca Jones	Hooker	Hillside Hawks	57	2002	2	0	0	0	0	3	1	0	0	4
18	Alex Knight	Second-row	Keighley Albion Cats	44	—	0	0	0	0	0	2	0	0	0	0
9	Michelle Land	Hooker	Wakefield Townville Panthers	9	1996	1	0	0	0	0	2	1	0	0	4
21	Paula McCourt	Second-row	Wakefield Townville Panthers	54	2002	3	1	0	0	4	5	2	0	0	8
8	Lisa McIntosh	Prop	Bradford Thunderbirds	13	1996	3	0	0	0	0	3	0	0	0	0
4	Sally Milburn	Centre	Barrow	25	1996	3	4	0	0	16	4	4	0	0	16
16	Nikki O'Donnell	Prop	Hull Dockers	51	2002	1	0	0	0	0	3	0	0	0	0
17	Natalie Parsons	Stand-off	Bradford Thunderbirds	52	2003	0	0	0	0	0	2	1	2	0	8
5	Chantelle Patrick	Wing	Bradford Thunderbirds	2	1996	3	1	0	0	4	4	2	0	0	8
10	Nicholette Postlethwaite	Prop	Wigan	50	2002	3	0	0	0	0	5	1	0	0	4
3	Donna Prime	Wing, Centre	Hull Dockers	48	2002	3	0	0	0	0	5	0	0	0	0
13	Debbie Rice	Centre	Hull Dockers	41	2000	3	0	0	0	0	4	1	0	0	4
7	Amy Robinson	Scrum-half	Hull Dockers	49	2002	2	0	0	0	0	2	0	0	0	0
20	Kirsty Robinson	Scrum-half	Bradford Thunderbirds	32	1998	2	1	0	0	4	4	4	0	0	16
24	Nicola Simpson	Centre	Milford Storm	56	2002	1	0	0	0	0	3	3	0	0	12
12	Rebecca Stevens	Second-row	Sheffield	33	1998	3	0	0	0	0	4	0	0	0	0
5	Dannielle Titterington	Wing, Hooker	Wakefield Townville Panthers	39	2000	3	0	0	0	0	5	1	0	0	4
14	Gemma Walsh	Stand-off	Wakefield Townville Panthers	45	2000	1	0	0	0	0	3	2	9	0	26
22	Rachael Wilson	Second-row	Wakefield Townville Panthers	55	2002	3	0	0	0	0	5	0	0	0	0

Notes:

- Great Britain players were assigned a jersey number for the duration of the tour. For example, Paula McCourt appeared in jersey number 21 in the three Tests, as well as the matches against Queensland and the Australian Capital Territory.
- The match report for the Queensland game listed 19 players, with six on the interchange bench. The tally of appearances reflects this extension beyond the then standard 17 players.
- Jane Banks toured Australia in 1996 and played in tour matches, but did not make her Test debut until the 1998 tour of New Zealand.
- Samantha Brook was selected in the squad but withdrew from the tour due to deep vein thrombosis (DVT).
- Natalie Parsons, at age 17, was the second youngest member of the squad.

== Australia squad ==
The Australian squad was selected after the national championships on the June long weekend. This tournament featured two teams from Queensland, the Australian Capital Territory, and despite the lack of a club competition in Sydney, New South Wales. Ten members of the Queensland A team were included in the squad, and one member from the Queensland Barbarians team. Three members of the Australian Capital Territory team were selected to in both the Australian squad and to play for NSW in the interstate game, held in Brisbane on 23 June 2002.

=== Team leadership ===
Australia was led by captain Natalie Dwyer and coach Terry Boland. Karyn Murphy was unavailable to play in the series due to injury, but filled the role of assistant coach. Support staff included manager Jeanette Luker and trainers Tudor Young, Angela Street, and Kate Field.

=== Player’s test record ===
J#	Player	Position(s)	Club	State / Territory	H#	Test Matches
J#	Player	Position(s)	Club	State / Territory	H#	Debut	M	T	G	D	P
1	Teresa Anderson	Fullback	North Aspley	Qld	39	1998	3		0	0	0
2	Erin Elliott	Wing	—	Qld	65	2002	3		0	0	0
3, 16	Neena Fraser	Centre	—	Qld	66	2002	2		0	0	0
4	Samantha Ramsamy	Centre	Toowoomba	Qld	60	2001	3		0	0	0
5	Nicole Pollard	Wing	Gungahlin Bulls	ACT	59	2001	2		0	0	0
6	Tracy Bailey	Five-eighth	North Aspley	Qld	63	2002	3		0	0	0
7	Natalie Dwyer	Halfback	Brothers Ipswich	Qld	1	1995	3		3	0	6
8, 15	Katrina Fanning	Prop	—	ACT	6	1995	3		0	0	0
9	Tammy Pohatu	Hooker	Brothers Ipswich	Qld	58	2001	3		0	0	4
10, 15, 8	Melissa Edwards	Prop	Toowoomba	Qld	55	2001	3		1	0	2
11	Loretta O'Neill	Second-row	Brothers Ipswich	Qld	18	1995	3		0	0	12
12	Veronica White	Second-row	Brothers Ipswich	Qld	19	1995	3		0	0	0
13	Tahnee Norris	Lock	Brothers Ipswich	Qld	42	1998	3		0	0	0
14	Rebecca Tavo	Centre	Toowoomba	Qld	68	2002	3		0	0	8
15, 17	Karley Banks	Wing, Five-eighth	Toowoomba	Qld	64	2002	3		0	0	0
16	Tracey Musgrove		Toowoomba	Qld	67	2002	1		0	0	0
17	Annie Banks	Hooker	—	Qld	54	1999	1		0	0	0
18	Rommillia Emanuel		—	ACT	5	1995	0		0	0	0
3	Tracey Thompson	Centre	Brothers Ipswich	Qld	46	1999	2		0	0	4
5	Kelly O'Doherty	Wing	Brothers Ipswich	Qld	51	2000	2		0	0	8
10	Debbie Merritt	Prop	Brothers Ipswich	Qld	22	1996	2		0	0	0

Notes:

- Australia allocated jersey numbers fresh for each Test Match.
- Members of the Australian squad did not play for Queensland or the ACT against Great Britain.

== Results ==
First Test

Sunday, 14 July 2002

Australia	16 — 26	Great Britain
Tries: 3 Tammy Pohatu 3'; Loretta O'Neill 73'; Rebecca Tavo 79'; Goals: 2 Natalie Dwyer 1/1 5'; Melissa Edwards 1/2 74'	1st: 6–14; 2nd: 10–12	Tries: 5 Paula McCourt 16'; Jane Banks, 20'; Sally Milburn 36'; Chantelle Patrick 51'; Amy Robinson 70'; Goals: 3 Brenda Dobek 3/6 pen 40', 52', 71'

Ringrose Park, Wentworthville, Sydney
Attendance: ≈ 2,100
Referee: Marcus Jennet
Player of the Match: Teresa Bruce (GB) and Veronica White (Aus)

Wednesday, 17 July 2002

Queensland	10 — 52	Great Britain
Tries: 2 Tarah Westera', 20'; Kellie Batchelor', 42'; Goals: 1 Lisa Elkins	1st: 4–30; 2nd: 6–22	Tries: 10; Nicola Simpson 3 28', 64', 70'; Samantha Bailey 2 39', 68'; Rebecca Jones 6'; Kirsty Robinson 14'; Teresa Bruce 34'; Nicola Benstead 37'; Michelle Land 53'; Goals: 5 Gemma Walsh 3 Natalie Parsons 2

Ipswich Brothers Leagues Club
Attendance: ≈ 1,050
Referee: Eddie Kimmerly

Second Test

Saturday, 20 July 2002
3:30 PM

Australia	14 — 10	Great Britain
Tries: 3 Kelly O'Doherty', 14'; Loretta O'Neill', 49'; Tracey Thompson', 74'; Goals: 1 Natalie Dwyer	1st: 4–10; 2nd: 10–0	Tries: 2 Sally Milburn', 20', 24'; Goals: 1 Brenda Dobek

ANZ Stadium, Brisbane
Attendance: ≈ 10,000
(NRL Attendance: 13,009)
Referee: Marilyn McKenna
Touch judges: Alicia Newham, Vicki Café
Player of the Match: Tahnee Norris (Aus) and Sally Milburn (GB)

Tuesday, 23 July 2002

Australian Capital Territory	0 — 72	Great Britain
Tries: nil Goals: nil	1st: 0–34; 2nd: 0–38	Tries: 15; Teresa Bruce 4 11', 35', 43', 69'; Kirsty Robinson 2 3', 13'; Gemma Walsh 17', 49'; Paula McCourt 21'; Chantelle Patrick 52'; Samantha Bailey 59'; Dannielle Titterington 65'; Nicholette Postlethwaite 74'; Natalie Parsons 77'; Goals: 6 Gemma Walsh 6

Kippax Oval, Canberra
Attendance: ≈ 300
Referee: Chris Knightingale

Third Test

Saturday, 27 July 2002
3:30 PM

Australia	14 — 5	Great Britain
Tries: 3 Loretta O'Neill, 11'; Kelly O'Doherty 57'; Rebecca Tavo 71'; Goals: 1 Natalie Dwyer 1/3 12'	1st: 6–5; 2nd: 8–0	Tries: 1 Sally Milburn 15'; Goals: nil Brenda Dobek 0/2; Drop goals: 1 Brenda Dobek 1/2 5'

Canberra Stadium
Attendance: ≈ 7,500
(NRL Attendance: 8,702)
Referee: Marcus Jennett
Player of the Match: Natalie Dwyer (Aus) and Jane Banks (GB)

Notes:

- The Second Test was played prior to an NRL match between the Brisbane Broncos and Wests Tigers.
- The Third Test was the third in a four game event day programme. The Test was preceded by Jersey Flegg Cup and Reserve Grade (then named First Division) matches. The Test was followed by an NRL match between the Canberra Raiders and New Zealand Warriors.

== Players of the series ==
A player of the series award was selected for one player from each side.

- Natalie Dwyer (Australia)
- Teresa Bruce (Great Britain)

== Sources ==
Sources used to inform the creation of this page were drawn from direct online, indirect online and offline resources.
Resources with direct online access included:

- NRL articles on Jillaroos history.

Indirect online resources are newspaper and journal content housed on database applications (such as Newsbank and ProQuest) accessed through library eResources. Access may require library membership. As an example, SLNSW eResources requires a membership number, although membership is free to residents of New South Wales. Different titles have different starting dates. Newspaper text content is available in 2002 for all capital city based newspapers in Australia, and many large circulation newspapers in Great Britain. Newspapers that provided some coverage of this tour include:

- Canberra Times
- The Courier-Mail
- The Queensland Times (Ipswich)
- Cheshire, Greater Manchester, and Merseyside Counties Publications
- West Yorkshire & North Yorkshire Counties Publications

Offline resources are physical copies of books, journals or microfilm. Items used prior to and during the creation of this page include:

- Rugby Leaguer & League Express
- Big League
- Sydney League News
- Australian Rugby League - Annual Report (2001 & 2002)
- New South Wales Rugby League - Annual Report (2002)
