= Ron McLarty (rugby league) =

Ron McLarty was an Australian rugby league footballer, who played for Fortitude Valley of the Brisbane Rugby league premiership.

== Playing career ==
McLarty played reserve football for Valley Football Club in the 1930s, and in 1935, was selected as an outstanding minor grade player. He played fullback and wing and was regarded for his good kicking game, along with his good ball-handling. In 1931, he made the semi-finals with West End's under 16 rugby union team. His side defeated Norman Park 5–3 in the semi-finals. He scored 3 tries in a third grade game against Eastern Suburbs. McLarty scored 3 tries in the reserve grade Valley's 44–3 win in an August 1933 matchup vs Southern Suburbs.

The reserve grade Valleys made the 1934 semi-finals and McLarty played in the match against Western Suburbs. While Valleys found momentum later in the game, it was not enough to defeat Wests - who would win 16–6. In April 1935, McLarty scored a try and 2 goals against Souths in reserve grade.

McLarty's side made the reserve grade semi finals in 1936, however his side lost 14–5 to Norths. In July, he scored a try to help Valleys win the Pike Cup final over Western Suburbs.

In 1938, he was signed by the Valleys first grade team, after a short stint in rugby union for Eagle Junction. Later that year, he made an appearance for the first grade side at five-eighth in Valleys' intercity match against the Rockhampton representative team. Valleys' 32-0 trashing of Rockhampton resulted in many of the crowd leaving the game early and led the Central Queensland Herald to describe Rockhamptons' performance as a "Kindergarten display".

In May 1938, McLarty played in Valleys' 50–9 win over Brothers in A Grade.
