= Dennis Manteit =

Australian rugby league footballer

Personal information
- Born: 18 February 1943 (age 83) Jandowae, Queensland, Australia

Playing information
- Position: Second-row
Club
Years	Team	Pld	T	G	FG	P
1970–73	Canterbury-Bankstown	49	7	0	0	21
1974–76	Balmain Tigers	43	7	0	0	21
	Total	92	14	0	0	42
Representative
Years	Team	Pld	T	G	FG	P
1964–69	Queensland	15	15	0	0	3
1967–69	Australia	3	0	0	0	0
- Source: As of 25 October 2019

Dennis Manteit (born 18 February 1943 in Jandowae, Queensland) is an Australian former rugby league footballer who played in the 1960s and 1970s. In 2015, he was inducted into the Downlands College Hall of Fame for his success in international rugby league.

== Career ==
=== Club ===
A Hervey Bay junior, Dennis Manteit played in Queensland for Brothers and in New South Wales initially for Canterbury-Bankstown for four seasons between 1970-1973 and then Balmain for three seasons between 1974 and 1976, whom he captained during his final year to win the 1976 Amco Cup. He retired at the end of the 1976 season.

=== Representative ===
Dennis Manteit also played representative football for Queensland team on fifteen occasions between 1964-1969 and for the Australian national side on five occasions between 1967 and 1968. He is listed on the Australian Players Register as Kangaroo No. 414. He played 4 tests on the 1967-68 Kangaroo Tour and one world cup match in 1968. He also toured with the Kangaroos on the New Zealand tour in 1969.
