= Fongrave =

- Commune
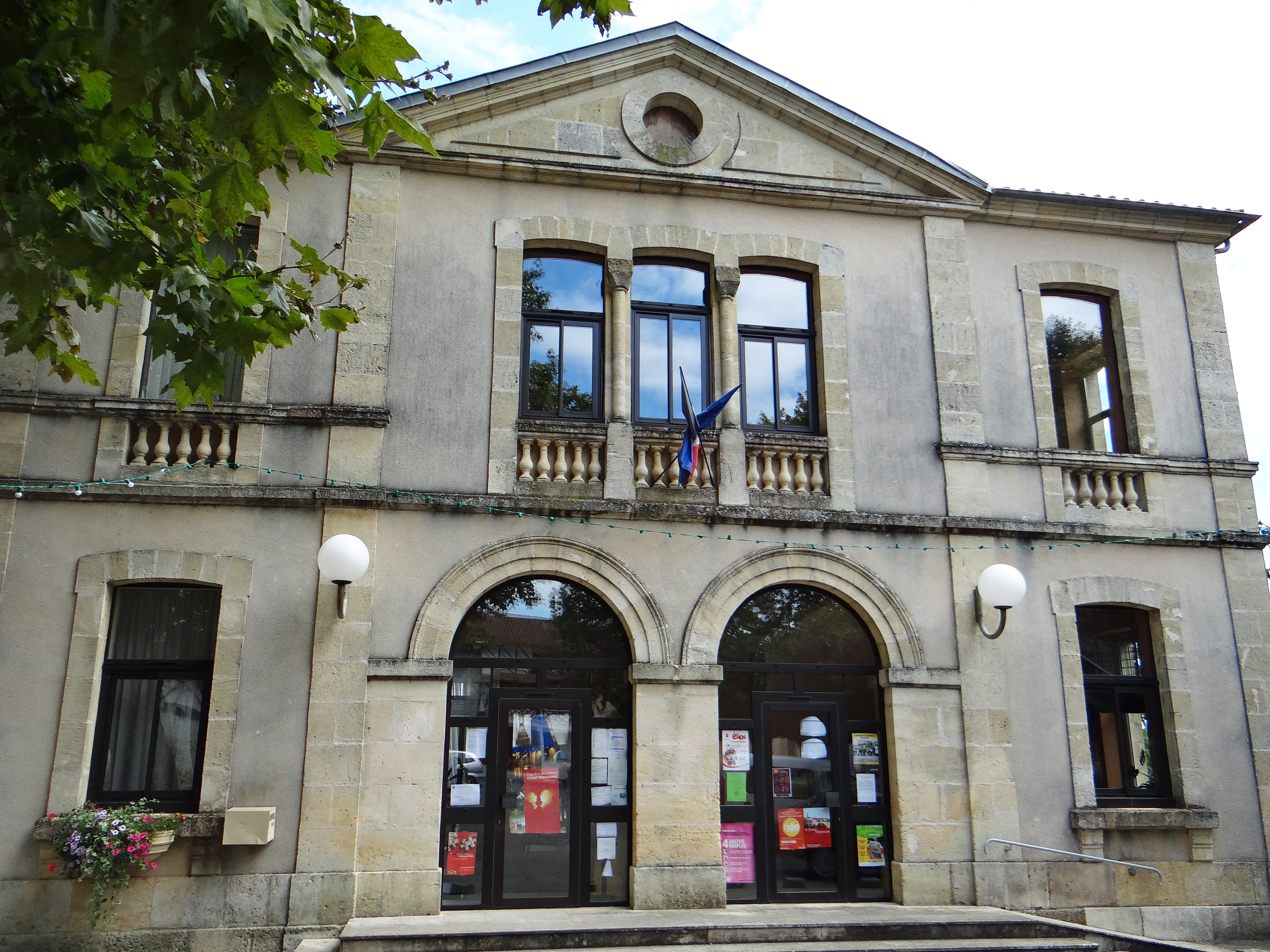
- The town hall in Fongrave
- Location of Fongrave
- Location within France Location within Nouvelle-Aquitaine
- Coordinates: 44°23′48″N 0°32′05″E
- Country: France
- Region: Nouvelle-Aquitaine
- Department: Lot-et-Garonne
- Arrondissement: Villeneuve-sur-Lot
- Canton: Le Livradais
- Intercommunality: CA Grand Villeneuvois

Government
  - Mayor (2020–2026): Laurent Periquet
- Area^{1}: 9.46 km^{2} (3.65 sq mi)
- Elevation: 50 m (160 ft)
- Highest elevation: 177 m (581 ft)
- Lowest elevation: 38 m (125 ft)
- Population (2023): 629
  - Density: 66.5/km^{2} (172/sq mi)
- Time zone: UTC+01:00 (CET)
  - Summer (DST): UTC+02:00 (CEST)
- INSEE/Postal code: 47099 /47260
- ^{1} French Land Register data, which excludes lakes, ponds, glaciers > 1 km^{2} (0.386 sq mi or 247 acres) and river estuaries.

Fongrave (French pronunciation: [fɔ̃ɡʁav]; Occitan: Fontgrava) is a commune in the Lot-et-Garonne department in south-western France.

== See also ==
- Communes of the Lot-et-Garonne department
