= John Gleeson (rugby league) =

Australia international rugby league footballer (1938–2021)

Personal information
- Born: 28 December 1938 Toowoomba, Queensland, Australia
- Died: 25 December 2021 (aged 82)

Playing information
- Height: 5 ft 6 in (168 cm)
- Position: Halfback
Club
| Years | Team | Pld | T | G | FG | P |
|---|---|---|---|---|---|---|
| 1953–58 | Chinchilla |
| 1959–62 | All Whites | 54 |
| 1963–64 | Wynnum-Manly |
| 1965 | Souths (Toowoomba) |
| 1966–68 | Brothers (Brisbane) |
| | Total | 54 | 0 | 0 | 0 | 0 |
Representative
| Years | Team | Pld | T | G | FG | P |
| 1961–67 | Queensland | 25 | 2 | 0 | 0 | 6 |
| 1964–67 | Australia | 10 | 2 | 0 | 0 | 6 |

John Gleeson (28 December 1938 – 25 December 2021), also known by the nickname of "Dookie", was an Australian former rugby league footballer who played in the 1950s and 1960s. An Australian international and Queensland interstate representative half, he played club football in the country for Chinchilla's team, in the Toowoomba Rugby League for the All Whites club, and in the Brisbane Rugby League for the Wynnum-Manly and Brothers clubs, winning the 1967 BRL premiership with the latter.

== Playing career ==
Gleeson was first player selected to represent Queensland in 1961 against New South Wales. In 1963, Brisbane Rugby League club Wynnum signed a host of big-name players, including Gleeson. At the end of the season, he was selected to represent his country on the 1963-64 Kangaroo tour of Britain and France, making him the first Wynnum-Manly player to achieve Kangaroo tour honours, and in doing so became part of the first Kangaroos squad to win the Ashes in England. Gleeson himself did not play in any of the Test matches on this tour, but the following year he became the club's second international after Lionel Morgan, being selected to play in two Test matches against France.

Gleeson spent 1965 playing in Toowoomba for the Souths club. He also went on the 1965 tour of New Zealand. After helping Brothers to the 1967 Brisbane Rugby League premiership, he went on the 1967-68 Kangaroo tour. With Gleeson filling in for the injured Billy Smith at halfback, fellow Queenslander Peter Gallagher led a depleted Australian team to an upset series victory.

== Post playing ==
In 2008, rugby league in Australia's centenary year, Gleeson was named on the bench of the Toowoomba and South West Team of the Century.

In 2013, Gleeson was inducted into the Queensland Sport Hall of Fame. He died on 25 December 2021, three days short of his 83rd birthday.
