= Saint-Pastour =

- Commune
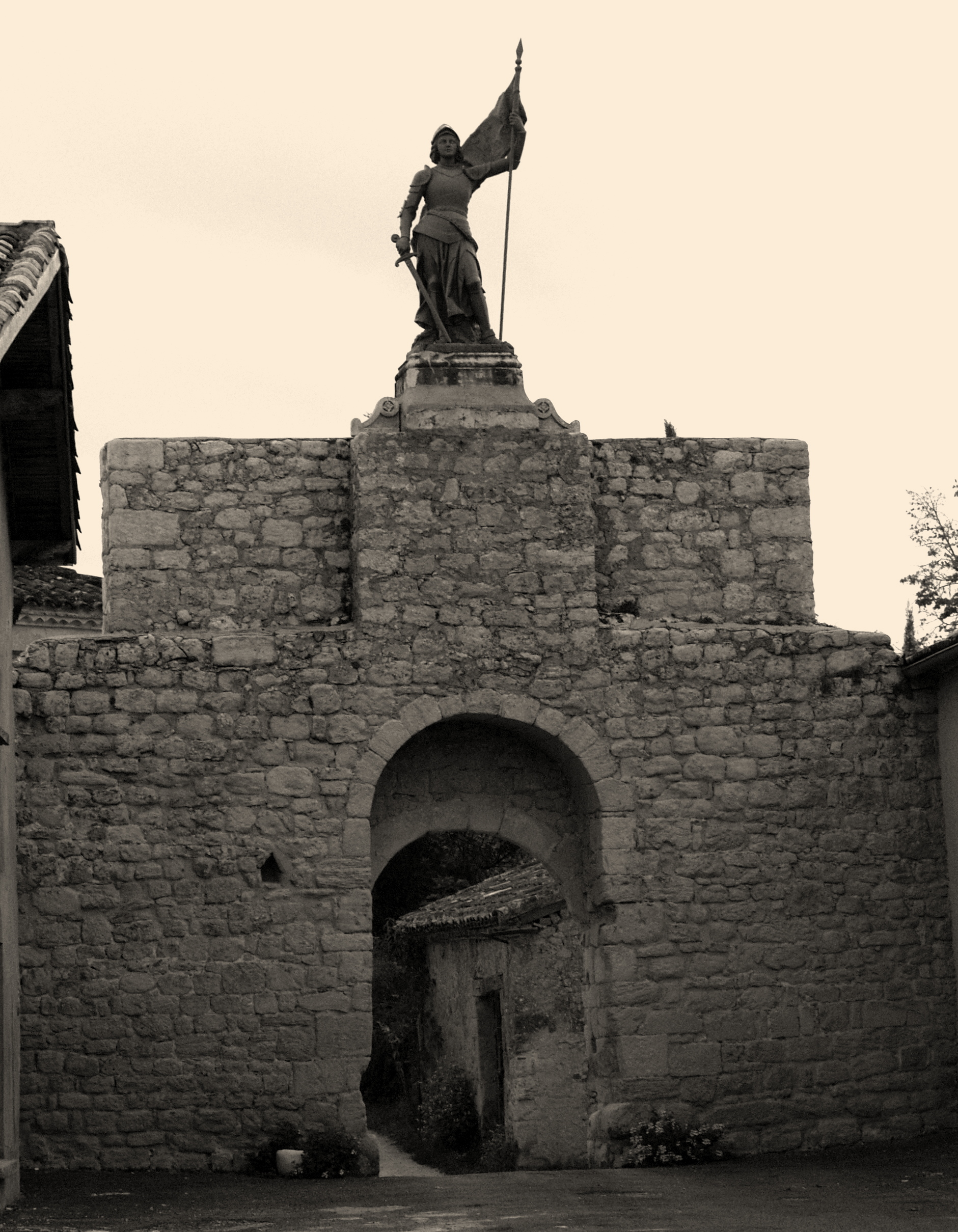
- A statue of Joan of Arc, in Saint-Pastour

- Coat of arms
- Location of Saint-Pastour
- Location within France Location within Nouvelle-Aquitaine
- Coordinates: 44°29′21″N 0°36′03″E
- Country: France
- Region: Nouvelle-Aquitaine
- Department: Lot-et-Garonne
- Arrondissement: Villeneuve-sur-Lot
- Canton: Le Livradais
- Intercommunality: Lot et Tolzac

Government
  - Mayor (2020–2026): Pierre Jeanneau
- Area^{1}: 14.52 km^{2} (5.61 sq mi)
- Elevation: 185 m (607 ft)
- Highest elevation: 196 m (643 ft)
- Lowest elevation: 62 m (203 ft)
- Population (2023): 379
  - Density: 26.1/km^{2} (67.6/sq mi)
- Time zone: UTC+01:00 (CET)
  - Summer (DST): UTC+02:00 (CEST)
- INSEE/Postal code: 47265 /47290
- ^{1} French Land Register data, which excludes lakes, ponds, glaciers > 1 km^{2} (0.386 sq mi or 247 acres) and river estuaries.

Saint-Pastour (French pronunciation: [sɛ̃ pastuʁ]; Occitan: Sent Pastor) is a commune in the Lot-et-Garonne department in south-western France.

== See also ==
- Communes of the Lot-et-Garonne department
