= Villebramar =

- Commune
- Coat of arms
- Location of Villebramar
- Location within France Location within Nouvelle-Aquitaine
- Coordinates: 44°31′46″N 0°28′36″E
- Country: France
- Region: Nouvelle-Aquitaine
- Department: Lot-et-Garonne
- Arrondissement: Villeneuve-sur-Lot
- Canton: Le Livradais
- Intercommunality: CC Lot et Tolzac

Government
  - Mayor (2020–2026): Sylvie Maurin
- Area^{1}: 10.06 km^{2} (3.88 sq mi)
- Elevation: 120 m (390 ft)
- Highest elevation: 147 m (482 ft)
- Lowest elevation: 62 m (203 ft)
- Population (2023): 109
  - Density: 10.8/km^{2} (28.1/sq mi)
- Time zone: UTC+01:00 (CET)
  - Summer (DST): UTC+02:00 (CEST)
- INSEE/Postal code: 47319 /47380
- ^{1} French Land Register data, which excludes lakes, ponds, glaciers > 1 km^{2} (0.386 sq mi or 247 acres) and river estuaries.

Villebramar (French pronunciation: [vilbʁamaʁ]; Occitan: Vilabramar) is a commune in the Lot-et-Garonne department in south-western France.

== See also ==
- Communes of the Lot-et-Garonne department
