= Tombebœuf =

- Commune
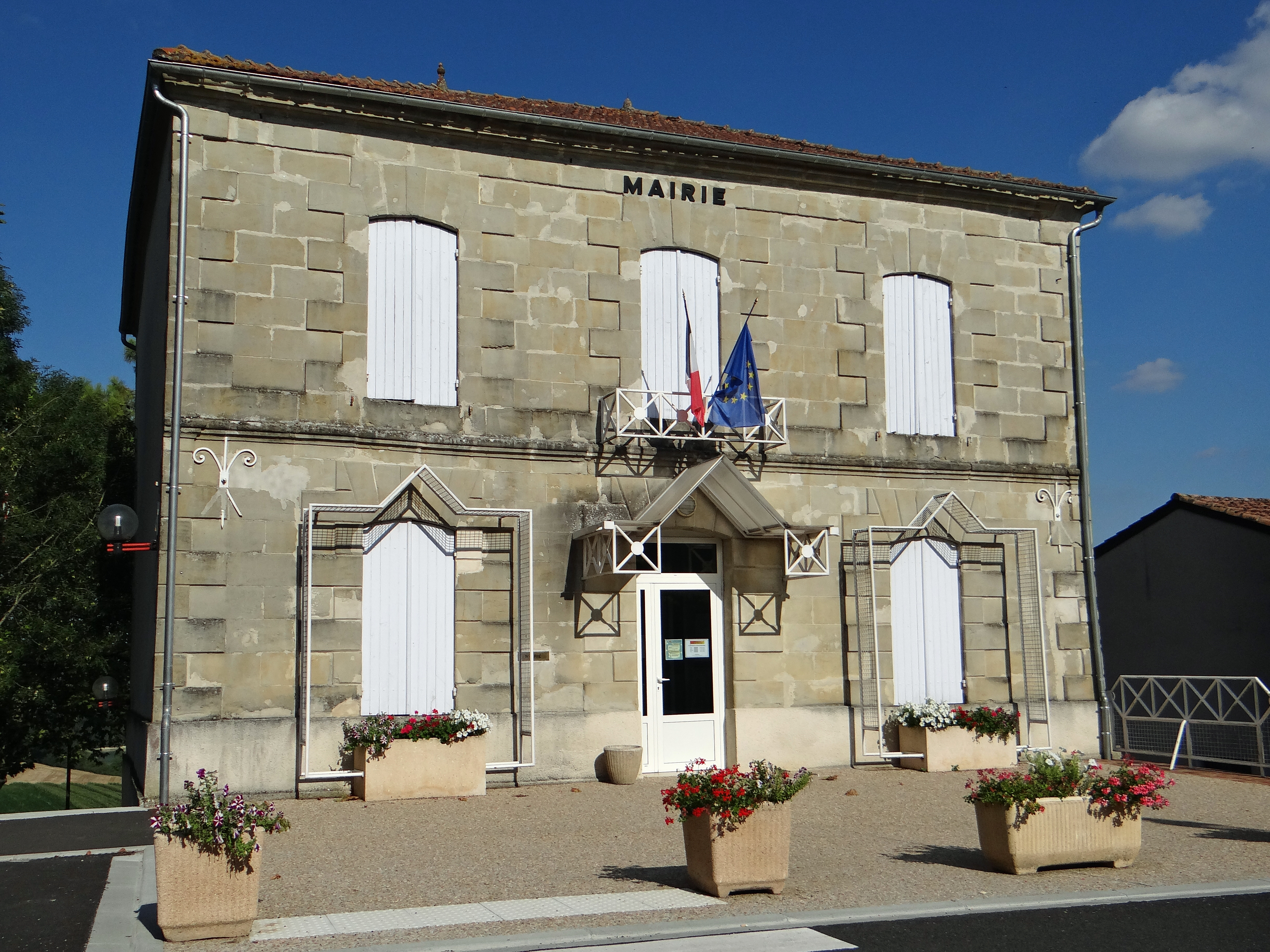
- Tombebœuf Town hall
- Location of Tombebœuf
- Location within France Location within Nouvelle-Aquitaine
- Coordinates: 44°30′28″N 0°27′08″E
- Country: France
- Region: Nouvelle-Aquitaine
- Department: Lot-et-Garonne
- Arrondissement: Villeneuve-sur-Lot
- Canton: Le Livradais
- Intercommunality: CC Lot et Tolzac

Government
  - Mayor (2020–2026): Claude Moinet
- Area^{1}: 18.38 km^{2} (7.10 sq mi)
- Elevation: 160 m (520 ft)
- Highest elevation: 152 m (499 ft)
- Lowest elevation: 57 m (187 ft)
- Population (2023): 443
  - Density: 24.1/km^{2} (62.4/sq mi)
- Time zone: UTC+01:00 (CET)
  - Summer (DST): UTC+02:00 (CEST)
- INSEE/Postal code: 47309 /47380
- ^{1} French Land Register data, which excludes lakes, ponds, glaciers > 1 km^{2} (0.386 sq mi or 247 acres) and river estuaries.

Tombebœuf (French pronunciation: [tɔ̃b.bœf]; Occitan: Tombabuèu) is a commune in the Lot-et-Garonne department in south-western France.

== See also ==
- Communes of the Lot-et-Garonne department
