= Pierre Sabatié =

France international rugby league footballer

Personal information
- Full name: Pierre Sabatié
- Born: 18 April 1977 (age 49) Villeneuve-sur-Lot, Nouvelle-Aquitaine, France

Playing information
- Position: Second-row
Club
Years	Team	Pld	T	G	FG	P
2000–02	Villeneuve Leopards	?	1	0	0	4
Representative
Years	Team	Pld	T	G	FG	P
1999–08	France	6	0	0	0	0
- Father: Christian Sabatié

Pierre Sabatié is a French former professional rugby league footballer who played for the Villeneuve Leopards in the Elite One Championship. He is a France international. He is the son of former French rugby league international Christian Sabatié.

In June 2008, he was in the France team for their match against England. In August, he was named in the France training squad for the 2008 Rugby League World Cup, but was not selected for the final squad.
