= Saint-Étienne-de-Fougères =

- Commune
- Location of Saint-Étienne-de-Fougères
- Location within France Location within Nouvelle-Aquitaine
- Coordinates: 44°25′10″N 0°33′20″E
- Country: France
- Region: Nouvelle-Aquitaine
- Department: Lot-et-Garonne
- Arrondissement: Villeneuve-sur-Lot
- Canton: Le Livradais
- Intercommunality: CA Grand Villeneuvois

Government
  - Mayor (2020–2026): Jean-Paul Cabas
- Area^{1}: 9.9 km^{2} (3.8 sq mi)
- Elevation: 54 m (177 ft)
- Highest elevation: 90 m (300 ft)
- Lowest elevation: 37 m (121 ft)
- Population (2023): 855
  - Density: 86/km^{2} (220/sq mi)
- Time zone: UTC+01:00 (CET)
  - Summer (DST): UTC+02:00 (CEST)
- INSEE/Postal code: 47239 /47380
- ^{1} French Land Register data, which excludes lakes, ponds, glaciers > 1 km^{2} (0.386 sq mi or 247 acres) and river estuaries.

Saint-Étienne-de-Fougères (French pronunciation: [sɛ̃.t‿etjɛn də fuʒɛʁ]; Languedocien: Sent Estèfe de Falguièras) is a commune in the Lot-et-Garonne department in south-western France.

== See also ==
- Communes of the Lot-et-Garonne department
