= Women's rugby league Ashes =

Proposed international rugby league series between Australia and England

The Ashes
Tournament information
- Sport: Rugby league
- Participants: Australia; England

The Ashes series, similar to the cricket series of the same name, was intended to be a test series between Australia and England women's national rugby league football teams. The women's Ashes was announced in 2023 alongside the revival of the men's tournament, with the inaugural tournament planned for 2025 alongside the men's.

The original men's series between Australia and Great Britain/England was contested 40 times between 1908 and 2025. The Great Britain women's team toured Australia twice; in 1996 and 2002.

== History ==
=== Origins ===
The original men's Ashes series was a best-of-three series of test matches between Australia and Great Britain national rugby league football teams. It had been contested 39 times from 1908 until 2003 largely with hosting rights alternating between the two countries.

Towards the end of this period, two women's test series took place between Australia and Great Britain, however it is unclear if these were referred to as The Ashes at the time. Both of these took place in Australia, the first taking place during the 1996 Great Britain Women's Rugby League Tour of Australia which saw Great Britain take a 2–1 test series victory over Australia. A similar tour was repeated in 2002, this time seeing Australia take 2–1 victory. In 2024, the 1996 Great Britain team were inducted in the Rugby Football League Hall of Fame.

=== Attempted establishment ===
On 3 August 2023, the announcement of the International Rugby League new 7-year international calendar and long-term strategy for growth of the international game which saw the return of the men's Ashes for the first time in 22 years and the establishment of the women's Ashes as a regular test series, with the inaugural edition to take place in 2025. Initially, all three test matches of the 2025 series were scheduled to take place in Australia (later switched to England) alongside the men's games. However, with the Super League involvement in the NRL's Rugby League Las Vegas event, came the proposal to stage the first of these tests matches in the United States as the third of four matches of the 2025 event.

The Vegas game, which was by then no longer described as part of the Ashes, saw a blowout 90–4 victory in Australia's favour. In the weeks that followed, criticism occurred as a result of the gulf in performance which highlighted the superior set up that women's rugby league had in Australia compared to England. No fixtures of the 2025 Women's Ashes were planned as of 26 March 2025, the date of announcement of the 2025 Men's Ashes; and in the months that followed, doubts emerged over the productiveness of contesting the remaining fixtures. The 2025 women's Ashes were officially confirmed as shelved in the International Rugby League's biannual ranking updates in July, with no mention of the proposed fixtures in their fixture preview for the next rankings cycle.

== See also ==
- Australia women's national rugby league team
- England women's national rugby league team
- Men's rugby league Ashes
- Wheelchair rugby league Ashes
