= Ron Lynch (rugby league) =

Australian rugby league footballer and coach (1939–2024)

Personal information
- Born: 12 June 1939 Young, New South Wales, Australia
- Died: 12 May 2024 (aged 84)

Playing information
- Position: Lock, Second-row
Club
Years	Team	Pld	T	G	FG	P
195?–60	Forbes
1961–71	Parramatta	194	28	0	0	84
1972–73	Penrith	44	10	0	0	30
	Total	238	38	0	0	114
Representative
Years	Team	Pld	T	G	FG	P
1960	NSW Country	1	0	0	0	0
1960–67	New South Wales	17	2	0	0	6
1961–70	Australia	12	1	0	0	3
1962–67	NSW City	3	2	0	0	6

Coaching information
Club
Years	Team	Gms	W	D	L	W%
1970	Parramatta	22	4	0	18	18
- Source: As of 20 June 2019

Ron Lynch (12 June 1939 – 12 May 2024) was an Australian professional rugby league footballer who played in the 1960s and 1970s. An Australian international and New South Wales interstate representative forward, he played club football in NSW for Young, Forbes, Parramatta and Penrith.

== Playing career ==
=== Young ===
Lynch started his playing career in the town of his birth, Young, where he played Maher Cup.

=== Forbes ===
Lynch moved to Forbes for work where he gained selection in the Country NSW and New South Wales sides in 1960.

=== Parramatta ===
Lynch then moved to Sydney for the 1961 NSWRFL season, playing for the Parramatta club after they paid a £700 transfer fee. During that season he made his Test debut against the Kiwis in New Zealand. Appointed captain of Parramatta, in 1963 Lynch led his club to victory over the touring South African side.

In 1964 he was the top try-scorer in a combined Sydney side's 49–2 rout of France. Lynch was selected to go on the 1967–68 Kangaroo tour of Great Britain and France. He played in the first and second Ashes series Test matches against Great Britain and in the first and second Test matches against France.

=== Penrith ===
Moving to Penrith for the 1972 NSWRFL season, Lynch was appointed captain of the club. He retired at the end of the 1973 season.

== Coaching career ==
In 1970, Lynch was Parramatta's captain-coach. The following season was to be his last for the club.

== Later life ==
Lynch was inducted into the Parramatta Eels hall of fame in 2003. He died following a long illness on 12 May 2024, 31 days short of his 85th birthday.
