= Montastruc, Lot-et-Garonne =

Montastruc
- Commune
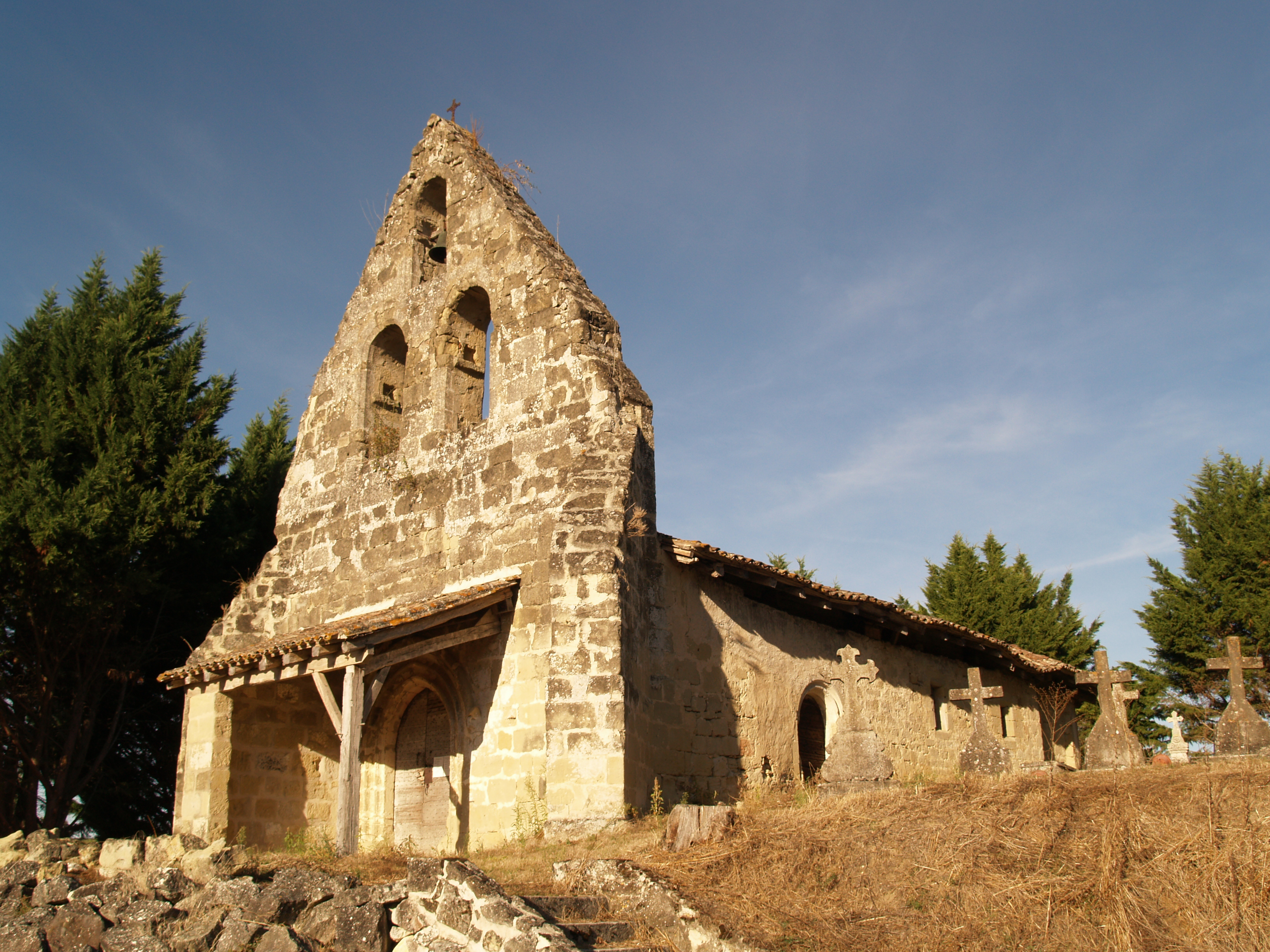
- The church in Montastruc
- Location of Montastruc
- Location within France Location within Nouvelle-Aquitaine
- Coordinates: 44°29′23″N 0°31′10″E
- Country: France
- Region: Nouvelle-Aquitaine
- Department: Lot-et-Garonne
- Arrondissement: Villeneuve-sur-Lot
- Canton: Le Livradais

Government
  - Mayor (2020–2026): Ric Martin
- Area^{1}: 24.88 km^{2} (9.61 sq mi)
- Elevation: 190 m (620 ft)
- Highest elevation: 195 m (640 ft)
- Lowest elevation: 62 m (203 ft)
- Population (2023): 232
  - Density: 9.32/km^{2} (24.2/sq mi)
- Time zone: UTC+01:00 (CET)
  - Summer (DST): UTC+02:00 (CEST)
- INSEE/Postal code: 47182 /47380
- ^{1} French Land Register data, which excludes lakes, ponds, glaciers > 1 km^{2} (0.386 sq mi or 247 acres) and river estuaries.

Montastruc (French pronunciation: [mɔ̃tastʁyk]) is a commune in the Lot-et-Garonne department in south-western France.

It is an old fortified castle. A mainly agricultural village, with dairy and breeding cattle, fruits (especially the "Pruneau d'Agen") and cereals.

The Town Hall of Montastruc is situated in the middle of the village. It is housed in the old fortified structure of the castle. The city council is headed by a mayor, assisted by two deputy mayors and eight council members.

Sport and other activities in the area include trails for hiking, riding or biking. There is a golf course, "Golf de Barthe" in Tombeboeuf next to the "Bastides" route. At the riverside and the "Route of the Prune", visitors can go boating or hire a houseboat, play tennis and discover the historical buildings and sites in the area and the gascon gastronomy. There are also several wineries in the area, making Bergerac, Buzet, Cahors (and the "Vin du Tsar") Duras, Marmande and Bordeaux wines.

There are vacation houses and bed-and-breakfast in various categories.

== See also ==
- Communes of the Lot-et-Garonne department
