= Le Temple-sur-Lot =

- Commune
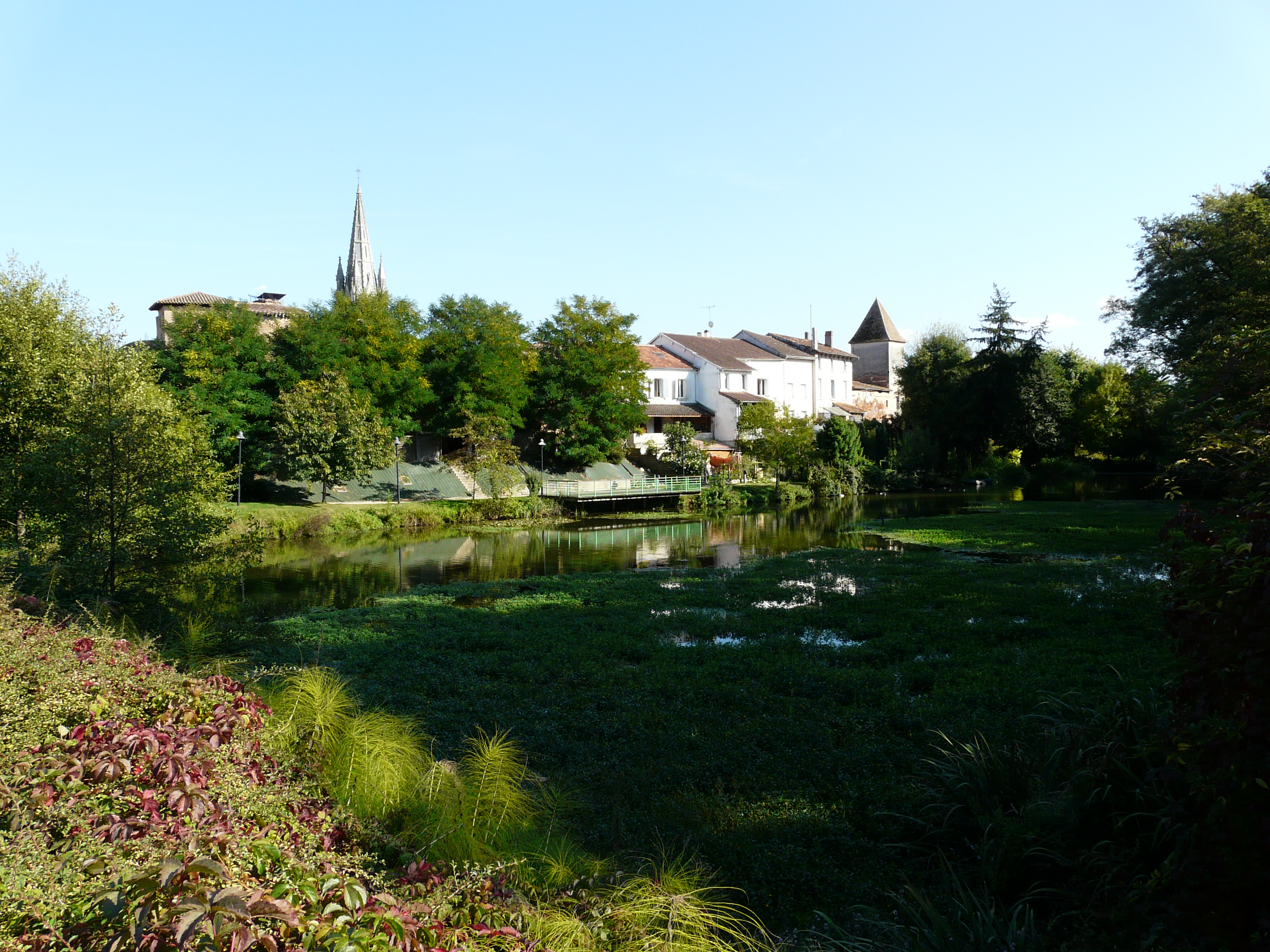
- A general view of Le Temple-sur-Lot

- Coat of arms
- Location of Le Temple-sur-Lot
- Location within France Location within Nouvelle-Aquitaine
- Coordinates: 44°22′50″N 0°31′32″E
- Country: France
- Region: Nouvelle-Aquitaine
- Department: Lot-et-Garonne
- Arrondissement: Villeneuve-sur-Lot
- Canton: Le Livradais
- Intercommunality: CC Lot et Tolzac

Government
  - Mayor (2020–2026): Jean-Michel Saint-Simon
- Area^{1}: 16.91 km^{2} (6.53 sq mi)
- Elevation: 41 m (135 ft)
- Highest elevation: 190 m (620 ft)
- Lowest elevation: 32 m (105 ft)
- Population (2023): 1,118
  - Density: 66.11/km^{2} (171.2/sq mi)
- Time zone: UTC+01:00 (CET)
  - Summer (DST): UTC+02:00 (CEST)
- INSEE/Postal code: 47306 /47110
- ^{1} French Land Register data, which excludes lakes, ponds, glaciers > 1 km^{2} (0.386 sq mi or 247 acres) and river estuaries.

Le Temple-sur-Lot (French pronunciation: [lə tɑ̃pl syʁ lɔt]; lit. 'The Temple-on-Lot'; Languedocien: Lo Temple d'Òlt) is a commune in the Lot-et-Garonne department in southwestern France.

== See also ==
- Communes of the Lot-et-Garonne department
