= Tourtrès =

- Commune
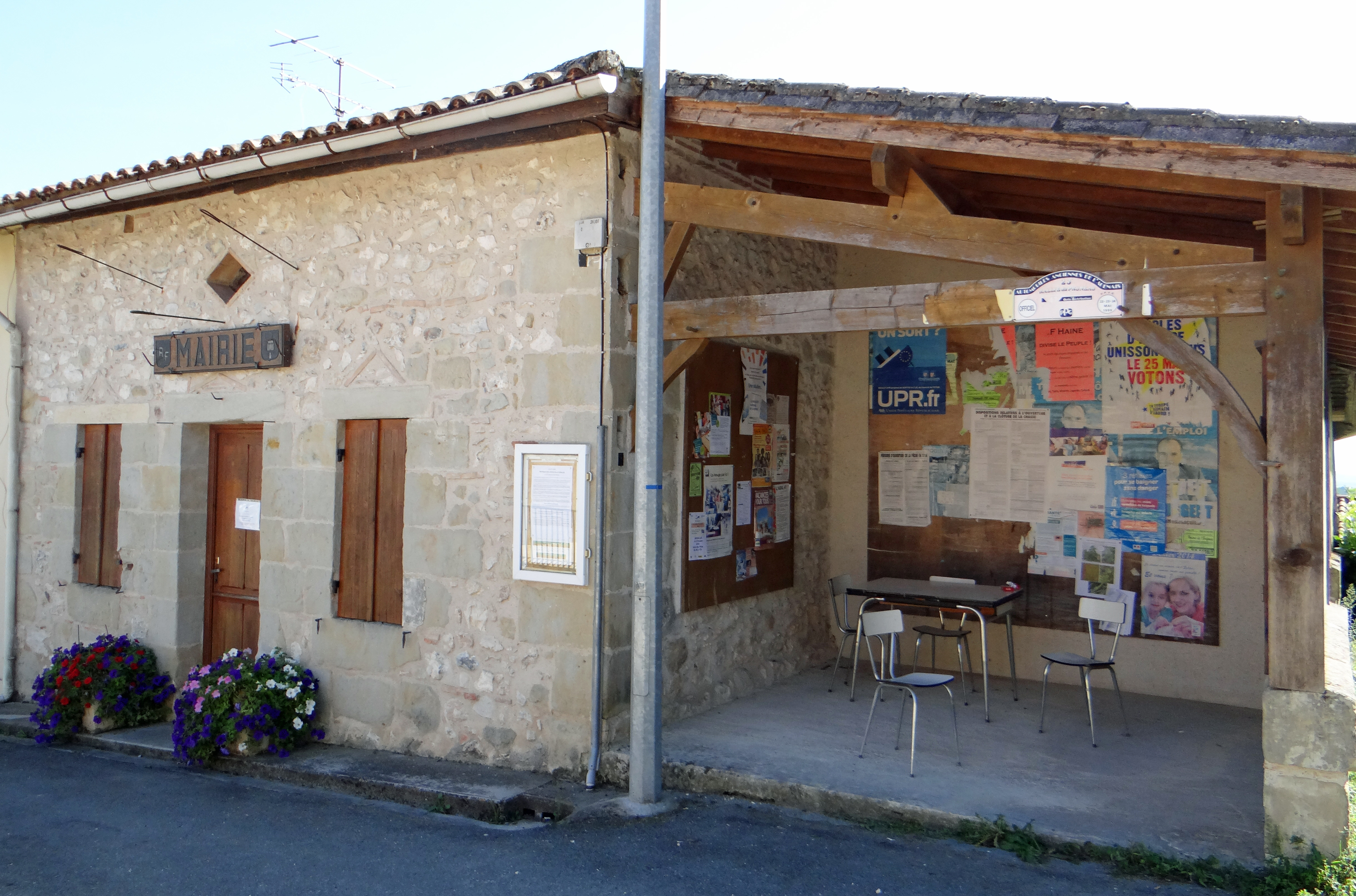
- The town hall in Tourtrès
- Location of Tourtrès
- Location within France Location within Nouvelle-Aquitaine
- Coordinates: 44°30′24″N 0°25′42″E
- Country: France
- Region: Nouvelle-Aquitaine
- Department: Lot-et-Garonne
- Arrondissement: Villeneuve-sur-Lot
- Canton: Le Livradais
- Intercommunality: CC Lot et Tolzac

Government
  - Mayor (2020–2026): Michel Le Borgne
- Area^{1}: 11.71 km^{2} (4.52 sq mi)
- Elevation: 177 m (581 ft)
- Highest elevation: 171 m (561 ft)
- Lowest elevation: 59 m (194 ft)
- Population (2023): 140
  - Density: 12/km^{2} (31/sq mi)
- Time zone: UTC+01:00 (CET)
  - Summer (DST): UTC+02:00 (CEST)
- INSEE/Postal code: 47313 /47380
- ^{1} French Land Register data, which excludes lakes, ponds, glaciers > 1 km^{2} (0.386 sq mi or 247 acres) and river estuaries.

Tourtrès (French pronunciation: [tuʁtʁɛs]; Occitan: Tortrés) is a commune in the Lot-et-Garonne department in south-western France.

== See also ==
- Communes of the Lot-et-Garonne department
