= Noel Gallagher (rugby league) =

Australian rugby league player

Personal information
- Born: 1944 (age 80–81)

Playing information
- Position: Hooker / Prop
Club
Years	Team	Pld	T	G	FG	P
1969–70	Cronulla-Sutherland	25	5	0	0	15
Representative
Years	Team	Pld	T	G	FG	P
1966	Queensland	2	0	0	0	0
1967	Australia	2	0	0	0	0

Noel Gallagher (born 1944) is an Australian former rugby league player.

A Bundaberg Brothers front-rower, Gallagher was a Queensland representative player in 1966 and the following year made the national squad for their end of season tour of Great Britain and France, playing in two Test matches. He debuted as a hooker in the 2nd Test at White City Stadium, replacing Noel Kelly who was shifted to prop. His other appearance came in the 2nd Test against France in Carcassonne. He joined Cronulla-Sutherland in 1969 after a contested transfer row and featured mainly as a prop during his two first-grade seasons with the Sharks.
