= Canton of Le Livradais =

Coordinates: 44.40°N 0.59°E

The canton of Le Livradais is an administrative division of the Lot-et-Garonne department, southwestern France. It was created at the French canton reorganisation which came into effect in March 2015. Its seat is in Sainte-Livrade-sur-Lot.

It consists of the following communes:

1. Allez-et-Cazeneuve
2. Casseneuil
3. Dolmayrac
4. Fongrave
5. Monclar
6. Montastruc
7. Pinel-Hauterive
8. Sainte-Livrade-sur-Lot
9. Saint-Étienne-de-Fougères
10. Saint-Pastour
11. Le Temple-sur-Lot
12. Tombebœuf
13. Tourtrès
14. Villebramar
