= Men's rugby league Ashes =

Rugby league Test series

The Ashes
Tournament information
- Sport: Rugby league
- Established: 1908
- Administrators: Australian Rugby League Commission; Rugby Football League
- Participants: Australia (Note: The Australasia rugby league team competed in the 1910, 1911–12, 1921–22 Ashes series instead of the Australia national team. The side was made up of mostly Australian players but bolstered by a number of players from New Zealand. Despite this, all appeance and scoring statistics went towards the Australian national team.) vs Great Britain (until 2003); England (from 2025)

Current champion
- Australia (21st title)

Most recent tournament
- 2025 Rugby League Ashes

The Ashes series is a best-of-three series of test matches between Australia and England national rugby league football teams.

Named after the cricket series of the same name, the series was initially contested between the Australia and Great Britain national teams. The series first took place in 1908, and was contested 39 times until 2003, with hosting usually alternating between the two countries. Since 1973, Australia has won a record thirteen consecutive Ashes series.

After a hiatus of over 20 years, the Ashes series was revived in 2025. The series will continue as a best-of-three test match series between Australia and England.

== Origin ==
The term "Ashes" originated in cricket, with several other sporting events adopting the concept, and by the beginning of the 20th century it was an "accepted principle" that a test series had to have at least three matches to be a true test of which side was the best, leading to the modern day best of five in cricket and best of three in rugby league. For a brief period, the games were known as "Winter Ashes" and "Summer Ashes" reflecting the time of year the two sport's were traditionally play. Before Australia and Great Britain began contesting the Ashes in rugby league, Australia also contested Ashes in rugby union against New Zealand until it was placed by the Bledisloe Cup in 1931.

== History ==
=== Australia vs Great Britain ===
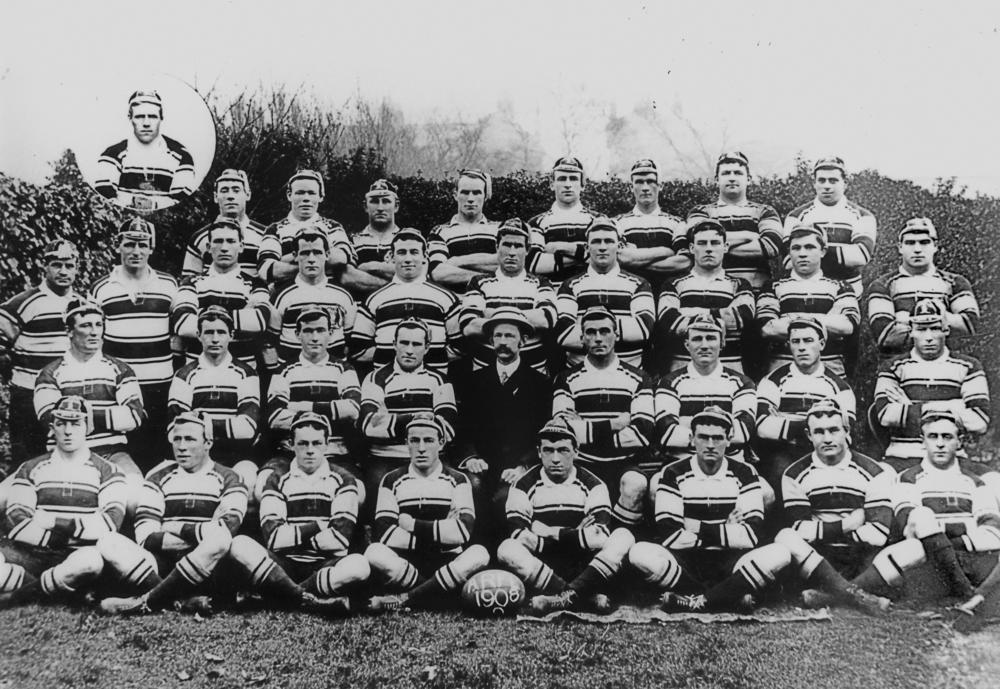
The Australia squad of the 1908–09 Ashes

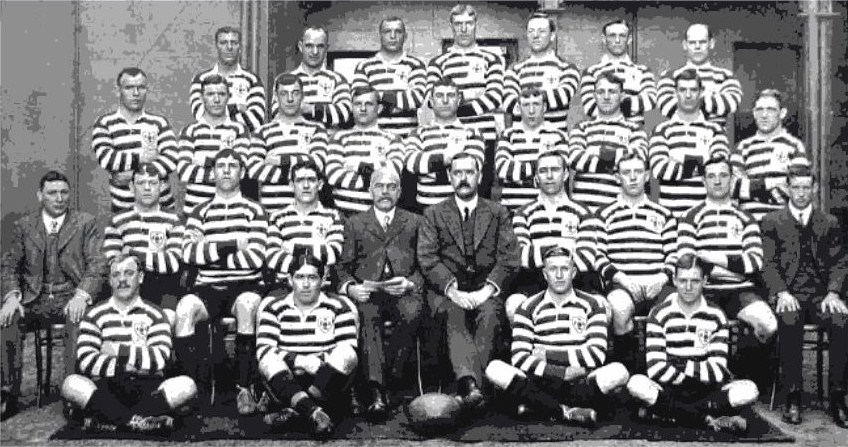
The Great Britain squad of the 1910 Ashes

The first rugby league Ashes tour began on 27 September 1908, when the side arrived in England. They played their first Ashes Test against Great Britain (despite being called England) in December in London, with two further tests played. The vast majority of subsequent series were played as a best of three competition.

In 1911–12 and 1921–22, the Australia team included New Zealand players so were styled "Australasia" for these series.

In the 1929–30 Ashes series both teams won one game and one game was drawn, so a further match was held to determine the outcome.

In 1948, Greater Britain officially adopted the name after being named "Northern Union XIII", "England", and "The Lions" on previous tours.

Since 1964 the Harry Sunderland Medal is awarded to the best Australian player in a home Ashes series.

Great Britain's last win was in 1970. Australia won 13 consecutive Ashes, 5 of those (1979, 1982, 1984, 1986 and 2003) being 3–0 series wins, and saw a record 15 game winning streak between 1978 and 1988 which was ended by a famous third test victory for Great Britain in Sydney by 26–12.

The 1982 Kangaroos became the first side to go through a tour of Great Britain and France undefeated (something never achieved on a Lions tour, though they came close in 1954 losing just 2 games). This earned the team the nickname "The Invincibles". The 1986 Kangaroos repeated this feat and would be known as "The Unbeatables".

In 1997 a Super League Test series of three matches between Great Britain and Australia was played with the Australia side being made up of Super League aligned players, however this is not considered an Ashes series.

The Ashes were contested only twice after this, in 2001 and 2003, both won by Australia.

=== Hiatus ===
In 2009 with the prospect of not contesting them until after the 2013 World Cup, Britain's Rugby Football League (RFL) challenged the Australian Rugby League (ARL) to play the round-robin stage match of the Four Nations tournament with the Ashes at stake. The one-off game would be a departure from the usual three-match series, additionally the contest would be between England, rather than Great Britain, and Australia. The ARL initially agreed to the proposal but later, facing hostility from former Ashes players and fans who thought the proposals devalued the Ashes, the two governing bodies decided not to proceed.

In 2016, newly appointed Australian team coach Mal Meninga, who as a player was selected to a record 4 Kangaroo Tours (the last two as captain) and played in a record 6 Ashes series (1982, 1984, 1986, 1990, 1992 and 1994 - playing a record 17 Ashes tests, only missing 1988 through injury), publicly advocated for a return of the Kangaroo Tours which would see The Ashes revived in 2020. The proposed 2020 series was cancelled in June 2020 due to the COVID-19 pandemic. It was suggested that the series may instead be played in 2022; however, this never eventuated. In October 2022, Meninga stated that talks were underway for a potential Ashes tour of England in 2024.

=== Revival: Australia vs England ===
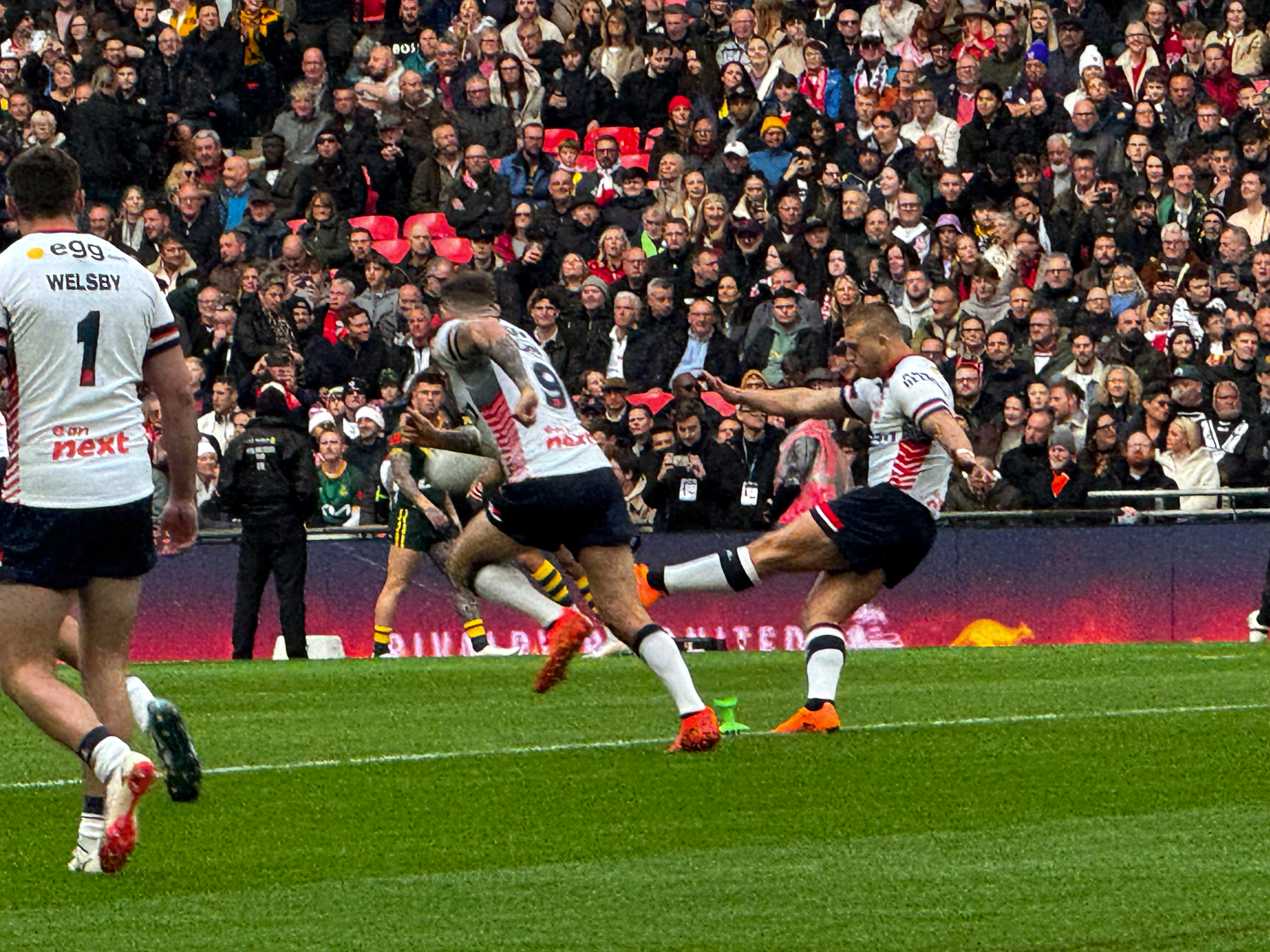
Mikey Lewis of England kicking off the first test of the modern Ashes era at Wembley Stadium in 2025

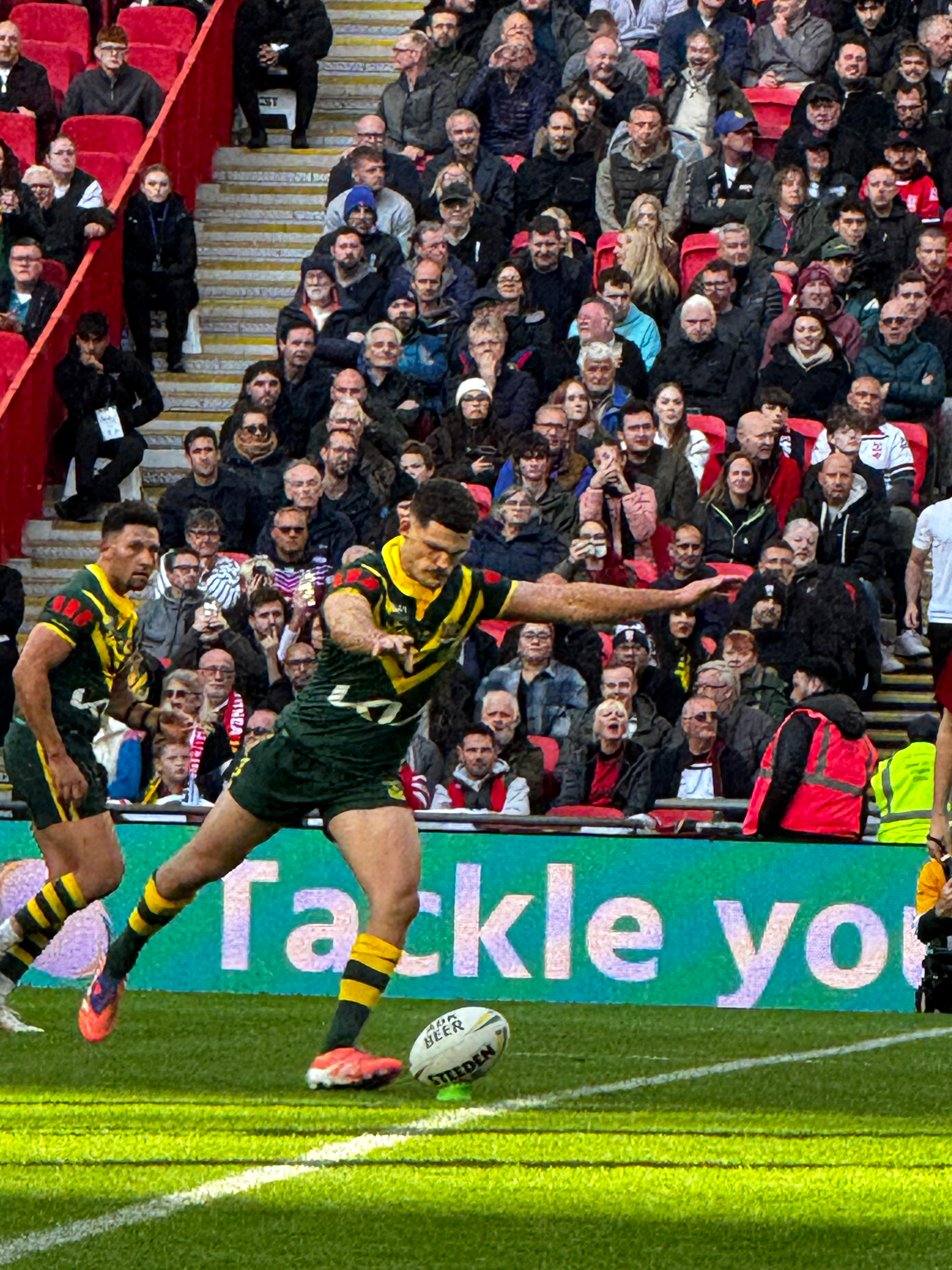
Nathan Cleary of Australia kicking off for the second half

On 3 August 2023, the revival of The Ashes was announced by International Rugby League as part of their new 7-year international calendar and long-term strategy for growth of the international game. The revamped competition was also scheduled to feature a women's test series for the first time, (Note: There had been previous women's Ashes test series, but this was never an established regular competition.) with the first edition to take place in 2025 (though this was later cancelled).

On 26 March 2025, the inaugural edition of the modern Ashes series confirmed by the Rugby Football League, with matches held at Wembley Stadium, Bramley-Moore Dock Stadium, and Headingley, with all three matches shown on BBC One and BBC iPlayer.

Ahead of the 2025 event, the RFL and ARLC announced a new player of the series award, the Fulton-Reilly award, named after Ashes legends Bob Fulton and Mal Reilly. The inaugural awarded was won by Cameron Munster.

The 2025 Ashes was spectated by 132,418 proving to be one of the most popular international rugby league events in recent times in the United Kingdom. The series also ranked third in the most spectated Ashes series held in the UK after 1990 and 1994. Australia won the series 3–0, with the next Ashes to be played in 2028.

== Trophy ==
In 1928, the City Tattersalls Club in Sydney, Australia donated a trophy to be the prize, the "Ashes Cup". The Cup's inscription reads:

INTERNATIONAL
RUGBY LEAGUE FOOTBALL
Australia v England
(THE ASHES)
Presented by
CITY TATTERSALLS CLUB

The Cup was first presented in 1928 to The Lions, after they defeated Australia 2–1 in the series. Following the 1933–34 series, in which England retained the Cup for the third time since first being presented with it, the Cup disappeared in the United Kingdom and was not found until October 1945. The trophy had been on display at a function in Ilkley, Yorkshire and afterwards was returned to the manager of the Griffin Hotel, Leeds - where the English Rugby League management met - but this was not made clear to the English authorities and instead in laid overlooked in a box for 12 years. During the period it was missing, Great Britain had won each series and the Cup's disappearance was not widely known. The Australian team first won the Cup in 1950.

In preparation for the Legends of League exhibition at the National Museum of Australia in 2008, marking a Centenary of Rugby League in Australia, the Ashes Cup underwent preservation work.

== Results ==
Year	Winner	Result	Runners-up	Host country
1908–09	Great Britain (1)	2–0 (1 tied)	Australia	Great Britain
1910	Great Britain (2)	2–0	Australasia	Australia
1911–12	Australasia(1)	2–0 (1 tied)	Great Britain	Great Britain
1914	Great Britain (3)	2–1	Australia	Australia
1920	Australia (2)	2–1	Great Britain	Australia
1921–22	Great Britain (4)	2–1	Australasia	Great Britain
1924	Great Britain (5)	2–1	Australia	Australia
1928	Great Britain (6)	2–1	Australia	Australia
1929–30	Great Britain (7)	2–1 (1 tied)	Australia	Great Britain
1932	Great Britain (8)	2–1	Australia	Australia
1933	Great Britain (9)	3–0	Australia	Great Britain
1936	Great Britain (10)	2–1	Australia	Australia
1937	Great Britain (11)	2–1	Australia	Great Britain
1946	Great Britain (12)	2–0 (1 tied)	Australia	Australia
1948	Great Britain (13)	3–0	Australia	Great Britain
1950	Australia (3)	2–1	Great Britain	Australia
1952	Great Britain (14)	2–1	Australia	Great Britain
1954	Australia (4)	2–1	Great Britain	Australia
1956	Great Britain (15)	2–1	Australia	Great Britain
1958	Great Britain (16)	2–1	Australia	Australia
1959	Great Britain (17)	2–1	Australia	Great Britain
1962	Great Britain (18)	2–1	Australia	Australia
1963	Australia (5)	2–1	Great Britain	Great Britain
1966	Australia (6)	2–1	Great Britain	Australia
1967	Australia (7)	2–1	Great Britain	Great Britain
1970	Great Britain (19)	2–1	Australia	Australia
1973	Australia (8)	2–1	Great Britain	Great Britain
1974	Australia (9)	2–1	Great Britain	Australia
1978	Australia (10)	2–1	Great Britain	Great Britain
1979	Australia (11)	3–0	Great Britain	Australia
1982	Australia (12)	3–0	Great Britain	Great Britain
1984	Australia (13)	3–0	Great Britain	Australia
1986	Australia (14)	3–0	Great Britain	Great Britain
1988	Australia (15)	2–1	Great Britain	Australia
1990	Australia (16)	2–1	Great Britain	Great Britain
1992	Australia (17)	2–1	Great Britain	Australia
1994	Australia (18)	2–1	Great Britain	Great Britain
2001	Australia (19)	2–1	Great Britain	Great Britain
2003	Australia (20)	3–0	Great Britain	Great Britain
2020	Series cancelled due to the COVID-19 pandemic			England
2025	Australia (21)	3–0	England	England

== Records and statistics ==
	Played	Won by Australia	Won by Great Britain/England	Drawn
All Series	40	21 (52.5%)	19 (47.5)	0 (0%)
Series in Australia	19	9 (47.4%)	10 (52.6%)	0 (0%)
Series in Great Britain/England	21	12 (57.1%)	9 (42.9%)	0 (0%)
All Tests	120	62 (51.7%)	54 (45%)	4 (3.3%)
Tests in Australia	59	30 (50.8%)	28 (47.5%)	1 (1.7%)
Tests in Great Britain/England	61	32 (52.5%)	26 (42.6%)	3 (4.9%)

=== Highest attendance ===
- Australia – 70,204 at the Sydney Cricket Ground, Sydney, 6 June 1932
- Great Britain/England – 60,812 at Wembley Stadium, London, 25 October 2025

=== Lowest attendance ===
- Australia – 15,944 at the Sydney Football Stadium, Sydney, 9 July 1988
- Great Britain – 2,000 at the Park Royal Ground, London, 12 October 1908

=== Highest attended Ashes series ===
- Australia – 179,816 in 1954
- Great Britain – 140,432 in 1994

=== Lowest attended Ashes series ===
- Australia – 60,000 in 1910
- Great Britain – 33,000 in 1908–09

=== Highest score ===
- Australia 50–12 Great Britain at Station Road, Swinton, 9 November 1963
- Great Britain 40–17 Australia at Sydney Cricket Ground, Sydney, 19 July 1958

=== Biggest win ===
- 38 points – Australia 50–12 Great Britain at Station Road, Swinton, 9 November 1963
- 23 points – Great Britain 40–17 Australia at Sydney Cricket Ground, Sydney, 19 July 1958
  23 points - Great Britain 33–10 Australia at Princes Park, Melbourne, 26 June 1992

=== Most tries in an Ashes test ===
- Australia
  3 – Jim Devereux at Park Royal Ground, London, 12 December 1908
  3 – Reg Gasnier at Station Road, Swinton, 17 October 1959
  3 – Reg Gasnier at Wembley Stadium, 16 October 1963
  3 – Ken Irvine at Station Road, Swinton, 9 November 1963
  3 – Ken Irvine at Sydney Cricket Ground, Sydney, 23 July 1966
  3 – Gene Miles at Old Trafford, Manchester, 25 October 1986
  3 – Michael O'Connor at Old Trafford, Manchester, 25 October 1986

=== Most goals in an Ashes test ===
- Australia
  10 – by Michael Cronin at Sydney Cricket Ground, Sydney, 16 June 1979
- Great Britain
  10 – by Lewis Jones at Brisbane Cricket Ground, Brisbane, 9 July 1954

=== Most points in an Ashes test ===
- Australia
  22 (3 tries, 5 goals) by Michael O'Connor at Old Trafford, Manchester, 25 October 1986
- Great Britain
  20 (10 goals) by Lewis Jones at Brisbane Cricket Ground, Brisbane, 9 July 1954
  20 (2 tries, 6 goals, 1 field goal) - Roger Millward at Sydney Cricket Ground, Sydney, 20 June 1970

=== Most points in an Ashes series ===
- Australia
  48 (2 tries, 21 goals) by Mal Meninga in 1982
- Great Britain
  30 (15 goals) by Lewis Jones in 1954

=== Most points in all Ashes tests ===
- Australia
  108 (9 tries, 37 goals) by Mal Meninga (17 tests – 1982–1994)
- Great Britain
  62 (31 goals) by Jim Sullivan (15 tests – 1924–1933)

=== Tries in each test of an Ashes series ===
- Australia
  Ken Irvine, 1962 and 1963
  Sam Backo, 1988
  Mal Meninga, 1990
- Great Britain
  George Tyson, 1908–09
  Johnny Thomas, 1908–09 and 1910
  Jim Leytham, 1910
  Jonty Parkin, 1924
  Ike Southward, 1958
  Garry Schofield, 1986

=== Most games as captain ===
- Australia
  9 by Clive Churchill (1950–1954)
  9 by Wally Lewis (1984–1988)
  9 by Mal Meninga (1990–1994)
- Great Britain
  10 by Jim Sullivan (1928–1933)

=== Most games as coach ===
- Australia – 12 by Frank Stanton (1978–1984)
- Great Britain – 9 by Mal Reilly (1988–1992)

=== Clean Sweeps ===
- Australia – 1979, 1982, 1984, 1986, 2003, 2025
- Great Britain – 1910, 1933, 1948–49

== See also ==
- Australia national rugby league team
- Great Britain national rugby league team
- England national rugby league team
- Women's rugby league Ashes
- Wheelchair rugby league Ashes
