= 1996 Great Britain women's rugby league tour of Australia =

Series of rugby league matches

- Manager: Nikki Carter
- Coach(es): Ian Harris
- Tour captain(s): Lisa McIntosh
- Top point scorer(s): Chantelle Patrick 36
- Top try scorer(s): Chantelle Patrick 9
- Top test point scorer(s): Chantelle Patrick 16
- Top test try scorer(s): Chantelle Patrick 4
Summary
P	W	D	L
Total
7	6	0	1
Test match
3	2	0	1
Opponent
P	W	D	L
Australia
3	2	0	1

Tour chronology
- Next tour: 1998

The Great Britain women’s rugby league tour of Australia in 1996 was the first such tour by a female British or English rugby league team. Seven matches were played during the three-week tour, including three Test matches. These were the first rugby league internationals played by Great Britain or England women. For the host nation, Australia, this tour followed on from a visit by the New Zealand women’s rugby league team during the previous year, 1995.

The tour was successful for the team, with Great Britain winning six of the seven matches. The first Test match was narrowly won by Australia, but Great Britain rallied to win the second and third Test matches by small margins to claim a series victory.

At the time, the Great Britain team received little support or recognition for their achievement. The Great Britain players had to self-fund the tour and their Australian counterparts were reportedly asked to contribute between A$1,000 and A$3,000 to play against Great Britain and for a proposed tour of New Zealand. It was not until 2022 that the Great Britain players were given caps and heritage numbers by the Rugby Football League. In the same year, three of the team, Brenda Dobek, Lisa McIntosh and Sally Milburn, were the first to be inducted into the Women's Hall of Fame. In 2024 it was announced that the 1996 Lionesses were to be the first team to be inducted into the Hall of Fame and were described as "the last senior British team to complete an Ashes series victory over Australia".

== Team leadership ==
The team was coached by Ian Harris with Jackie Sheldon as assistant coach. Nikki Carter was tour manager. Paula Clark served as the team’s physiotherapist. The team was captained by Lisa McIntosh with vice-captain Brenda Dobek.

== Squad ==
A photo of the 1996 touring team is included with the Dobek interview on the Women in Rugby League website.

Squad number	Player	Club	Tries	Goals	Points
13	Lisa McIntosh (c)	Dudley Hill	4	1	18
6	Brenda Dobek (vc)	Wakefield Panthers	3	2	16
16	Jill Adams	Redhill	2	0	8
17	Jane Banks	Wigan St Patricks	0	0	0
10	Sharon Birkenhead	Redhill	0	0	0
4	Karen Burrows	Redhill	3	6	24
5	Wendy Charnley	Rochdale	0	0	0
20	Julie Cronin	York	1	0	4
22	Lucy Ferguson	Wakefield Panthers	0	0	0
7	Mandy Green	Dudley Hill	1	0	4
18	Nicki Harrison	Dudley Hill	1	0	4
21	Joanne Hewson	Askam	2	0	8
15	Lisa Hunter	Hull Vixens	0	0	0
23	Allison Kitchin	Barrow	2	0	8
3	Liz Kitchin	Barrow	3	0	12
9	Michelle Land	Wakefield Panthers	2	0	8
25	Sally Milburn	Askam	5	0	20
8	Donna Parker	Hull Vixens	2	0	8
2	Chantelle Patrick	Dudley Hill	9	0	36
24	Samantha Pearson	Dudley Hill	0	0	0
26	Joanne Roberts	Wakefield Panthers	1	0	4
11	Lucia Scott	Rochdale	0	0	0
14	Vicky Studd	Dudley Hill	1	0	4
19	Paula Tunnicliffe	Rochdale	0	0	0
12	Sandra Wade	Barrow	0	0	0
1	Joanna Will	Wakefield Panthers	1	0	4

== Results ==
July 16

Sydney Select XIII	0–86	Great Britain
Tries: nil Goals: nil		Tries: 17; Lisa McIntosh 3 Chantelle Patrick 3 Brenda Dobek 2 Allison Kitchin 2 Liz Kitchin 2 Lucia Stott 2 Michelle Land 2 Mandy Green; Goals: 9 Lucia Stott 7 Brenda Dobek 2

Redfern Oval, Sydney
Referee:
Player of the Match: Lisa McIntosh

July 18

Australian Capital Territory	0–36	Great Britain
Tries: nil Goals: nil		Tries: 7 Joanne Hewson 2 Sally Milburn 2 Donna Parker; Jill Adams; Julie Cronin; Goals: 4 Karen Burrows 4

Steinfield Oval, Canberra
Referee:
Player of the Match: Vicky Studd

=== 1st Test ===
July 21
1.50pm

Australia	16–14	Great Britain
Tries: 3 Allison Smith; Fiona Huntington; Katrina Fanning; Goals: 2 Allison Smith 2	Report; Replay	Tries: 3 Sally Milburn; Jill Adams; Chantelle Patrick; Goals: 1 Karen Burrows

Phillip Oval, Canberra
Referee:
Great Britain's Player of the Match: Brenda Dobek

Despite comprehensive victories to Great Britain in both tour games leading into the First Test Match, their inaugural meeting with Australia was tightly contested.
Great Britain scored the first try in the opening ten minutes, Sally Milburn touching down after a great pass from Allison Kitchin. The try was converted by Karen Burrows. The first half continued with the Great Britain dominating the attack, however, Alison Smith scored an unconverted try for Australia just prior to the break.

The Australians were finding it tough to break the defensive line and lacked the support play of the British and the distribution from the ruck was not as effective.

— Karen Hardy, Canberra Times (22 July 1996)

Australia’s attack was more effective in the second stanza. Fiona Huntington scored a try near the sideline within a few minutes of the resumption. Katrina Fanning then scored from a short run to the try-line, “hitting and spinning on the line to get the ball down.” With this try converted by Alison Smith, Australia lead 14–6.
Allison Kitchen made a break for Great Britain, running down the left edge. Australian second-rower Danielle Meskell made an impressive covering tackle, however, the Lionesses spread the ball to the right wing for Jill Adams to score.
The “deceptively quick” British five-eighth, Brenda Dobek, instigated the next try, popping a pass to captain Lisa McIntosh, who found in support Chantelle Patrick, who scored in the corner. This unconverted try levelled the scores at 14–all with about five minutes to play.
In injury time, Australia was awarded a penalty for a swinging arm in the tackle. From about 25 metres out and to the right of the posts, Alison Smith kicked a penalty goal to win the match for Australia.
The Canberra Times recognised Alison Smith and Danielle Meskell as the best players for Australia, and for Great Britain, hooker Michelle Land and the halves-pairing of Mandy Green and Brenda Dobek. Great Britain's team award for their best player in the match went to Brenda Dobek.

July 24

Queensland XIII	8–22	Great Britain
Tries: Goals:		Tries: 5 Chantelle Patrick; Karen Burrows; Lucia Stott; Vicky Studd; Sally Milburn; Goals: 1 Karen Burrows

Gilbert Park, Brisbane
Referee:
Player of the Match: Lucia Stott

=== 2nd Test ===
July 28

Australia	12–18	Great Britain
Tries: Goals:		Tries: 4 Chantelle Patrick; Karen Burrows; Sally Milburn; Joanne Roberts; Goals: 1 Lisa McIntosh

Gilbert Park, Brisbane
Referee: Julia Lee
Player of the Match: Joanne Hewson

July 31

Presidents XIII	0–30	Great Britain
Tries: nil Goals: nil		Tries: 7 Chantelle Patrick; Liz Kitchin; Karen Burrows; Brenda Dobek; Donna Parker; Joanna Will; Lucia Stott; Goals: 1 Lucia Stott

Cunningham Oval, Sydney
Referee:
Player of the Match: Jane Banks

=== 3rd Test ===
August 3

Australia	18–20	Great Britain
Tries: 4 Alyssa Campbell 2 Katrina Moss; Loretta O'Neill; Goals: 1 Allison Smith	Report; Highlights	Tries: 5 Chantelle Patrick 2 Lucia Stott; Lisa McIntosh; Nicki Harrison; Goals: 0

Redfern Oval, Sydney
Referee:
Player of the Match: Brenda Dobek
Player of the Series: Brenda Dobek

The third and deciding Test was again a tussle between evenly matched teams. Great Britain had established a 12–4 lead at halftime, but Australia scored an early second half try.

The Great Britain girls showed more flair in attack than their Australian rivals – who tended to play a more structured game with the football. Highlighting the visitor’s fast, open style of play, Great Britain’s five tries were all scored out wide.

— Cameron Bell, Daily Telegraph, Sydney (4 August 1996)

The score was 20–18 in Great Britain’s favour towards the end of the match. The last three minutes saw Great Britain under pressure, defending their line against Australia’s attack. The defence held, to secure Great Britain a series victory.

I don’t think we could ask for a better Test series – each game went right down to the wire and we were beaten by a very good team.

— Australian captain, Julie McGuffie, Daily Telegraph, Sydney (4 August 1996)

Great Britain’s player of the match, Brenda Dobek, was also named player of the series. Sydney’s Daily Telegraph cited Danielle Meskell as Australia’s standout player.

== Sources ==
Statistics for the Great Britain team drawn from a document supplied by the team’s coach. Point scorers for the First and Third Test verified by the contemporary match reports in the Canberra Times and Daily Telegraph.
Coverage of women’s rugby league in Australian newspapers in 1996 was limited, and the tour coincided with the 1996 Olympic Games. The Rugby League Week, a magazine dedicated to the sport in Australia included an advanced mention of the Third Test’s location (Redfern Oval) and published only the result of the First Test.
Access to 1996 editions of Australian newspapers and the Rugby League Week is offline, through microfilm and actual copies held in the State Library of New South Wales.

== See also ==
- Women's rugby league
- Australia women's national rugby league team
- Great Britain women's national rugby league team
- England women's national rugby league team
- Women's rugby league Ashes
