= Malcolm Price =

Wales dual-code rugby international footballer (1937–2024)

Personal information
- Full name: Malcolm John Price
- Born: 8 December 1937 Pontypool, Wales
- Died: 6 January 2024 (aged 86)

Playing information

Rugby union
- Position: Centre
Club
Years	Team	Pld	T	G	FG	P
≤1959–62	Pontypool RFC
Representative
Years	Team	Pld	T	G	FG	P
1959–62	Wales	9	2	0	0	6
1959	British Lions	5	4	0	0	12

Rugby league
- Position: Centre
Club
Years	Team	Pld	T	G	FG	P
1962–64	Oldham	23	14	0	0	42
1966–69	Rochdale Hornets
1969–≥69	Salford
	Total	23	14	0	0	42
Representative
Years	Team	Pld	T	G	FG	P
1967	Great Britain	2	1	0	0	3

Malcolm John Price (8 December 1937 – 6 January 2024) was a Welsh dual-code international rugby union and professional rugby league footballer who played in the 1950s and 1960s. He played representative level rugby union (RU) for British Lions and Wales, and at club level for Pontypool RFC, as a centre, and representative level rugby league (RL) for Great Britain, and at club level for Oldham, Rochdale Hornets and Salford, as a centre.

== Background ==
Malcolm Price was born in Pontypool, Wales on 8 December 1937. He died on 6 January 2024, at the age of 86.

== International honours ==
Price won nine caps for Wales (RU) between 1959 and 1962 and five caps in 1959 for British and Irish Lions while at Pontypool RFC. He also won caps for Great Britain (RL) while at Rochdale Hornets in 1967 against Australia (2 matches).
