= Allez-et-Cazeneuve =

- Commune
- Location of Allez-et-Cazeneuve
- Location within France Location within Nouvelle-Aquitaine
- Coordinates: 44°23′36″N 0°37′53″E
- Country: France
- Region: Nouvelle-Aquitaine
- Department: Lot-et-Garonne
- Arrondissement: Villeneuve-sur-Lot
- Canton: Le Livradais
- Intercommunality: CA Grand Villeneuvois

Government
  - Mayor (2020–2026): Bertrand Planté
- Area^{1}: 10.69 km^{2} (4.13 sq mi)
- Elevation: 200 m (660 ft)
- Highest elevation: 202 m (663 ft)
- Lowest elevation: 59 m (194 ft)
- Population (2023): 609
  - Density: 57.0/km^{2} (148/sq mi)
- Time zone: UTC+01:00 (CET)
  - Summer (DST): UTC+02:00 (CEST)
- INSEE/Postal code: 47006 /47110
- ^{1} French Land Register data, which excludes lakes, ponds, glaciers > 1 km^{2} (0.386 sq mi or 247 acres) and river estuaries.

Allez-et-Cazeneuve (French pronunciation: [ale e kaznœv]; Occitan: Alés e Casanuèva) is a commune of the Lot-et-Garonne department in southwestern France.

== Population ==
Historical population
Year	Pop.	±% p.a.
1968	408	—
1975	406	−0.07%
1982	478	+2.36%
1990	583	+2.51%
1999	579	−0.08%
2007	669	+1.82%
2012	678	+0.27%
2017	567	−3.51%
2023	609	+1.20%
Source: INSEE

== See also ==
- Communes of the Lot-et-Garonne department
