= Tony Branson =

Australia international rugby league footballer (1946–2020)

Personal information
- Full name: Anthony Ross Branson
- Born: 18 December 1946 Nowra, New South Wales
- Died: 1 April 2020 (aged 73)

Playing information
- Position: Five-eighth
Club
Years	Team	Pld	T	G	FG	P
1968–73	St. George Dragons	91	23	2	3	76
Representative
Years	Team	Pld	T	G	FG	P
1967	NSW Country Firsts	2	1	0	0	3
1967–71	New South Wales	7	1	0	0	3
1967–68	Australia	6	1	0	0	3
1971	NSW City Firsts	1	1	0	0	3
1974	Illawarra Firsts	1	1	0	0	3
- Source: Whiticker/Hudson

Tony Branson (1946-2020) was an Australian former rugby league footballer who played in the 1960s and 1970s. A state and national representative five-eighth from Nowra in country New South Wales, Branson came to Sydney in 1968 to join the St George Dragons in the New South Wales Rugby League premiership competition.

A country player from Nowra, Branson came to attention representing Country in two matches in 1967 including a rare Country win over City in the first match up of that year's series. He was selected at five-eighth in all three matches of the 1967 interstate series for New South Wales against Queensland and then made the 1967-68 Kangaroo Tour where he played in five Tests matches for Australia against Great Britain and France. Branson is listed on the Australian Players Register as Kangaroo No. 416. Following the tour Branson was signed to the St George Dragons to replace their stalwart star pivot Brian Clay whose career ended in 1967.

Branson made further representative appearances for New South Wales and represented Australia in two fixtures in the 1968 Rugby League World Cup where he was vying for selection at five-eighth against Bob Fulton who was at the very beginning of his rep career. In 1971 Branson made his final representative appearance for Australia in a one-off Test match against New Zealand.

Branson played six seasons in the top grade with the Dragons including the 1971 Grand Final loss to South Sydney. He played a further two seasons at St George and retired in 1973.
