= Peter Gallagher (rugby league, born 1937) =

Australia international rugby league footballer

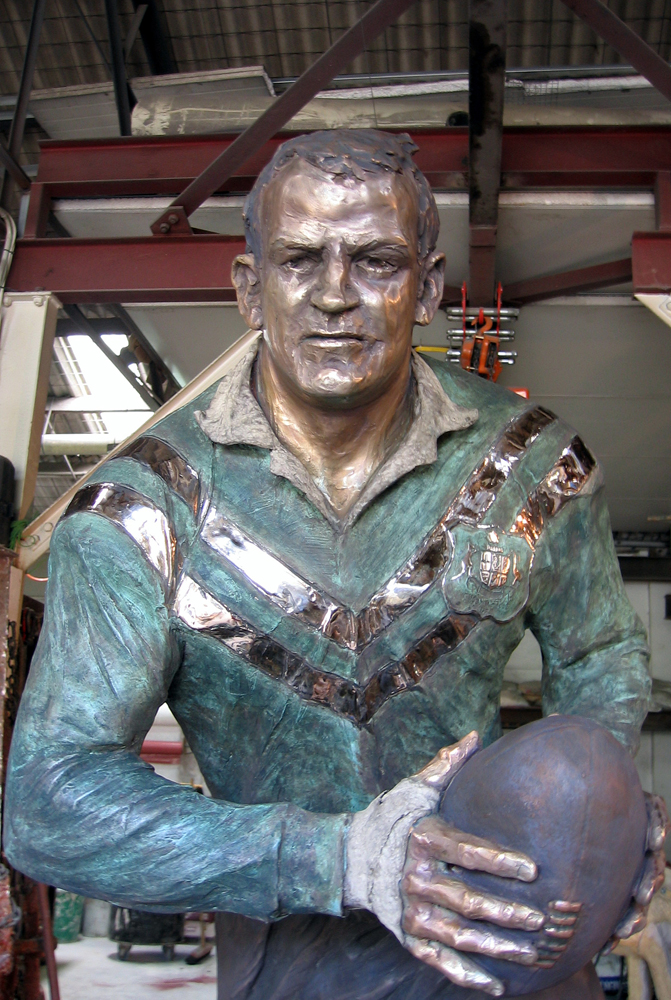
- Life-size bronze of Gallagher outside Gold Coast Turf Club by sculptor Linda Klarfeld

Personal information
- Full name: Peter Michael Gallagher
- Born: 21 January 1937 Townsville, Queensland, Australia
- Died: 11 November 2003 (aged 66) Gold Coast, Queensland, Australia

Playing information
- Position: Prop
Club
Years	Team	Pld	T	G	FG	P
1957–67	Brothers (Brisbane)	209	47			137
Representative
Years	Team	Pld	T	G	FG	P
1962–67	Queensland	21	1	0	0	3
1963–68	Australia	17	1	0	0	3

Peter "Pedro" Gallagher (1937–2003) was an Australian rugby league footballer. He was a front-row forward for the Australian national team. He played in 17 Tests between 1963 and 1968 as captain on 1 occasion. He is considered one of the nation's finest footballers of the 20th century.

== Early life ==
Hickey was born in Townsville, Australia. He was educated at St Edmund's College, Ipswich from 1950 to 1955.

== Playing career ==
Born in Townsville, Queensland Gallagher played his entire Brisbane Rugby League premiership first grade career of 11 seasons with the Brothers club. He first represented Queensland at age 25 in 1962 and then regularly over the next 5 years making 12 appearances against New South Wales as well as 5 appearances against touring international sides. Gallagher made his Test debut against New Zealand in the first Test of the 1963 series in Sydney and played in all five domestic Tests that year against New Zealand and South Africa. At the end of that year he was selected for the 1963 Kangaroo Tour of England and France. He played in 3 Tests and 18 minor tour matches.

In 1967 after recovering from a knee injury he returned to the national side for all three Tests against New Zealand. He made his 2nd Kangaroo Tour of England in 1967–68 and played in 10 tour matches and 6 Tests. He made his sole appearance as captain of the Kangaroos in the 2nd Test in London in November 1967.

== After football ==
In retirement he was heavily involved in the Queensland Racing Industry. He was Vice Chairman of the Gold Coast Turf Club for ten years and then chairman for a further five years. He was a driving force behind the Magic Millions Racing Carnival. He succumbed to cancer aged 66.

In February 2008, Gallagher was named in the list of Australia's 100 Greatest Players (1908–2007) which was commissioned by the NRL and ARL to celebrate the code's centenary year in Australia.

== Sources ==
- Whiticker, Alan (2004) Captaining the Kangaroos, New Holland, Sydney
- Andrews, Malcolm (2006) The ABC of Rugby League Austn Broadcasting Corpn, Sydney
- Queensland Representatives at qrl.com.au

Preceded by Ian Walsh	Australian national rugby league captain 1967	Succeeded by John Raper
