= John McDonald (rugby league) =

Australian rugby league footballer and coach (1944–2023)

John McDonald AM
Personal information
- Born: 24 April 1944 Toowoomba, Queensland, Australia
- Died: 13 September 2023 (aged 79)

Playing information
- Position: Centre, Wing
Club
Years	Team	Pld	T	G	FG	P
1960–68	Valleys (Toowoomba)
1969–71	Manly-Warringah	66	30	2	1	96
	Total	66	30	2	1	96
Representative
Years	Team	Pld	T	G	FG	P
1965–68	Queensland	9	2	0	0	6
1969–70	New South Wales	3	0	1	0	2
1966–70	Australia	13	5	9	0	33

Coaching information
Club
Years	Team	Gms	W	D	L	W%
	Toowoomba
Representative
Years	Team	Gms	W	D	L	W%
1979–80	Queensland

John McDonald AM (24 April 1944 – 13 September 2023) was an Australian rugby league footballer, coach and administrator.

== Career ==
A tall three-quarter back, he played club football in Toowoomba, representing Queensland ten times and also gaining selection for the Australian test team. In 1969, McDonald moved south, playing in the New South Wales Rugby Football League premiership with the Manly-Warringah club. After playing for his adopted state, he toured New Zealand as Australian vice-captain. He went on to captain Manly from the flank in the club's grand final loss to South Sydney in the 1970 NSWRFL season.

McDonald returned to Queensland after three seasons with the Sea Eagles to captain-coach Toowoomba and was elected president of the club after his retirement. He also coached Queensland in the late 1970s and was coach of the Maroons' first State of Origin team in 1980. By the end of the decade, he had progressed to the position of President of the Queensland Rugby League (QRL) and, in 1998, joined the National Rugby League Executive Committee and was named Chairman of the QRL and Australian Rugby League Board of Directors. That year, he was also named "Sport Administrator of the Year" at the Queensland Sport Awards.

McDonald was appointed a Member of the Order of Australia (AM) in the 2004 Queen's Birthday Honours. In 2008, rugby league in Australia's centenary year, McDonald was named at centre in the Toowoomba and South West Team of the Century. 2016 saw him inducted into Queensland Sport Hall of Fame.

== Personal life and death ==
His son Geoff McDonald is currently serving as Mayor of the Toowoomba Region. McDonald died on 13 September 2023, at the age of 79.

Sporting positions
Preceded by Barry Muir; 1974–1978	Coach Queensland; 1979–1980	Succeeded by Arthur Beetson; 1981–1984
