= Adolphe Alésina (rugby league, born 1969) =

French rugby league footballer

Personal information
- Born: 27 May 1969 (age 56) Pamiers, France

Playing information
- Position: centre
Club
| Years | Team | Pld | T | G | FG | P |
|---|---|---|---|---|---|---|
| 1988–91 | Pamiers XIII |
| 1991–92 | AS Carcassonne |
| 1992–95 | XIII Catalan |
| 1996–97 | Limoux Grizzlies |
| | Total | 0 | 0 | 0 | 0 | 0 |
Representative
| Years | Team | Pld | T | G | FG | P |
| 1991–93 | France | 5 | 0 | 0 | 0 | 0 |
- As of 16 January 2021
- Father: Adolphe Alésina

Adolphe Alésina (born 27 May 1969) is a French rugby league player. He is the son of the former rugby league player of the same name.

== Rugby league career ==
=== Club ===
- Pamiers
- AS Carcassonne XIII
- XIII Catalan
- XIII Limouxin

=== International caps ===
- France (5 caps) 1991 to 1993, against:
  - Great Britain : 1991, 1993,
  - Papua New Guinea : 1991,
  - CIS (former USSR): 1992.
