= Adolphe Alésina (rugby league, born 1943) =

French rugby league footballer (1943–2024)

Personal information
- Born: 21 April 1943 Weingarten, Germany
- Died: July 2024 (aged 81) Carcassonne, France

Playing information
- Height: 5 ft 9 in (1.75 m)
- Weight: 12 st 3 lb (78 kg)
- Position: lock
Club
Years	Team	Pld	T	G	FG	P
	AS Carcassonne
Representative
Years	Team	Pld	T	G	FG	P
1967–74	France	9	0	0	0	0
- As of 16 January 2021
- Relatives: Adolphe Alésina (son)
Medals
Men's rugby league
Representing France
Rugby League World Cup
Silver medal – second place	1968 Australia / New Zealand	Team

Adolf Alesina, known also as Adolphe Alésina Sr. (21 April 1943 – July 2024) was a French rugby league player, primarily known for his role as a lock forward.

Although he was most comfortable as a lock forward, Alésina Sr. was versatile enough to excel in various positions. The sports caption indicates that he had played for more than 40 years.

Alésina was born on 21 April 1943, and died in July 2024, at the age of 81. He was the father of Adolphe Alésina.

== Rugby league career ==
=== Club ===
- AS Carcassonne

=== France national team ===
- International (9 caps) 1967-1971, against :
  - Great Britain: 1967, 1968, 1971
  - Australia: 1967, 1968
  - New Zealand: 1968, 1971
