= Past Brothers =

Australian rugby league club, based in Brisbane, QLD

Club information
- Full name: Past Brothers Rugby League Football Club
- Nickname(s): Leprechauns, Brothers, The Brethren
- Colours: Navy Blue, White
- Founded: 1929; 96 years ago

Current details
- Ground(s): Corbett Park, Crosby Park (1989, 1992, 1998), Lang Park (1993), Bray Park (1994–97), ANZ Stadium (1998), Gibson Park (2006)
- Competition: Brisbane Rugby League, Queensland Cup, QRL South East Division
- 2014: 11th
- Current season

Records
- Premierships: 9 (1935, 1939, 1942, 1943, 1956, 1958, 1967, 1968, 1987)
- Runners-up: 10 (1940, 1952, 1954, 1955, 1957, 1959, 1964, 1966, 1974, 1986)
- Minor premierships: 5 (1956, 1957, 1968, 1970, 1987)
- Wooden spoons: 3 (1931, 1963, 1981)

The Past Brothers Rugby League Football Club, or Brisbane Brothers Rugby League Football Club nicknamed the Leprechauns, or more commonly known as Brothers, or as The Brethren, was a rugby league club based in the city of Brisbane, Australia, that played in the top level of football from its foundation in 1929 until 1998. The club previously played in the Queensland Cup and the Brisbane Rugby League premiership, but no longer plays in those competitions.

== History ==
Past Brothers was founded in 1929 when former members (Tom Gorman, Gerry Allman, Stan Ross amongst others) of the Brothers Old Boys decided to found a new club to compete in the Queensland Rugby League Metropolitan competition in Brisbane.

Brothers Old Boys played in the Brisbane Rugby League competition in the 1929 season but then resumed playing rugby in 1930. Then, the Past Brothers Club commenced competing in the Brisbane Rugby League competition.

Past Brothers did not win its first premiership until 1935 but quickly backed it up with more in 1939, 1942, and 1943. When district football was introduced in the 1930s, Brothers clearly defied the idea as, unlike their competition counterparts Valleys, Norths, Souths, Easts and Wests, they were not a location in Brisbane. Although the pressure was placed upon them by governing bodies, they were allowed to keep the unique name.

In the 1960s, while playing for Brothers, Peter Gallagher was selected as captain of Australia.

Brothers last success was as premiers in 1987, defeating the Redcliffe Dolphins in the grand final. The club had been runner-up to the Wynnum-Manly Seagulls the year before. By the time the Brisbane Broncos entered the Sydney Rugby League premiership in 1988, they were in financial trouble that only got worse as the years progressed. They were forced out of their traditional home at Corbett Park by financial administrators, and after temporarily playing out of Crosby Park, they relocated to Bray Park, renaming the club Pine Rivers Brothers. In 1998, they moved back to Brisbane under the name Brisbane Brothers and became a feeder club to the Broncos, before closing at season's end.

Seemingly out of its financial hardship by the turn of the century, Brothers applied for a position in the 2000 and 2001 Queensland Cups, but was ultimately unsuccessful. In 2002, it merged with Valleys and formed Brothers-Valleys, playing in the Quest Cup before re-entering the Queensland Cup in 2004. Brothers-Valleys finished last, with the only point coming from a draw in round 1. A new name and jersey were planned for the following year, but on 22 November the Queensland Rugby League announced, "The only club not participating in 2005 will be Brothers Diehards. While the QRL acknowledges the rich history associated with the organisation, the club’s inability to meet specified guidelines has resulted in this situation."

At present, Past Brothers' spirit continues to compete in the South East Division junior competitions, playing out of Gibson Park in Stafford as Brisbane Brothers JRLFC.

== Crest and colours ==
Traditionally, the club wears a predominantly navy blue jersey with white butcher stripes (irregular hoops), although for a time they wore an all-navy blue jersey with a thick white bar through the middle. The numbers on the backs of the players' jerseys were normally red on a white background, although, depending on the jersey design being used, they were sometimes white on a blue background.

== Home grounds ==
Traditionally the club's home ground was Corbett Park in The Grange. However, it was forced out by financial administrators when the club's financial position severely worsened. The club temporarily played out of Crosby Park in Albion and Lang Park, but in 1996 it relocated to Bray Park in the Pine Rivers Shire, hoping for greener pastures. This proved unsuccessful, and in 1998 the club was back in Brisbane. Through feeder club arrangement with the Brisbane Broncos, it played some "home" games as curtain-raisers at ANZ Stadium, with the remainder at Crosby Park, sharing the venue with Brothers Rugby Club. Currently, the brand name lives on in Brisbane through the junior club, Brisbane Brothers JRLFC, which has successfully operated out of Gibson Park, Stafford, since 2006.
