= 1956–57 Kangaroo tour of Great Britain and France =

Rugby league tour (1956–1957)

- Manager: Clarrie Fahy; Cyril Connell Sr.
- Tour captain(s): Ken Kearney
- Top point scorer(s): Gordon Clifford 94
- Top try scorer(s): Ian Moir 13
- Top test point scorer(s): Gordon Clifford 22
- Top test try scorer(s): Keith Holman 4
Summary
P	W	D	L
Total
28	18	1	9
Test match
6	4	0	2
Opponent
P	W	D	L
Great Britain
3	1	0	2
France
3	3	0	0

Tour chronology
- Previous tour: 1952–53
- Next tour: 1959–60

The 1956–57 Kangaroo tour was the ninth Kangaroo tour, in which the Australian national rugby league team travelled to Great Britain and France and played twenty-eight matches, including the Ashes series of three Test matches against Great Britain and three Test matches against the French. It followed the tour of 1952–53 and the next was staged in 1959–60.

== The squad's leadership ==
The team was captained by Ken Kearney with Clive Churchill as vice-captain. Tour co-managers were Clarrie Fahy and Cyril Connell Sr. The latter's son, Cyril Connell Jr. was a playing member of the touring party.
In the three matches in which neither Kearney nor Churchill played, the Kangaroos were captained by Cyril Connell Jr.

== Touring squad ==
The Rugby League News published a photo and details of the touring team including the players' ages and weights. Various newspapers published the names of the touring squad when it was selected in September 1956.
Match details - listing surnames of both teams and the point scorers - were included in E.E. Christensen's Official Rugby League Yearbook, as was a summary of the players' point-scoring.
Banks, Connell, Davies, Doyle, Flannery, Furner, McGovern, Payne, Tyquin and Watson were selected from Queensland clubs. Adams and Marsh were selected from clubs in New South Wales Country areas. The balance of the squad had played for Sydney-based clubs during the 1956 season.

Player	Position	Age	Weight	Club	Tests on Tour	Games	Tries	Goals	FG	Points
Clive Churchill	Fullback	29	11.0 (70)	South Sydney	2	15	0	10	3	26
Gordon Clifford	Fullback	26	12.0 (76)	Newtown	4	12	2	43	1	94
Denis Flannery	Wing	27	12.10 (81)	Ipswich Brothers	5	16	12	0	0	36
Don Adams	Wing	22	12.6 (79)	Newcastle	2	15	11	0	0	33
Des McGovern	Wing	28	13.3 (84)	Toowoomba All Whites	3	9	6	0	0	18
Ian Moir	Wing	24	11.4 (72)	South Sydney	2	16	13	0	0	39
Alex Watson	Centre	23	13.10 (87)	Brisbane Western Suburbs	5	18	1	0	0	3
Dick Poole	Centre	25	13.2 (83)	Newtown	6	17	7	0	0	21
Kevin O'Brien	Centre	24	12.12 (82)	St George	0	11	6	0	0	18
Tom Payne	Centre	21	12.6 (79)	Toowoomba All Whites	1	13	3	0	0	9
Bob Banks	Five-eighth	26	12.6 (79)	North Rockhampton	6	18	5	0	1	17
Ian Johnston	Five-eighth	29	12.8 (80)	Western Suburbs	0	9	7	0	0	21
Keith Holman	Halfback	28	11.9 (74)	Western Suburbs	6	17	10	5	0	40
Cyril Connell Jr.	Halfback	26	10.10 (68)	North Rockhampton	0	14	10	17	0	64
Ian Doyle	Lock	24	13.1 (83)	Toowoomba All Whites	4	16	2	0	0	6
Tom Tyquin	Lock	23	14.4 (91)	South Brisbane	3	16	2	0	0	6
Norm Provan	Second-row	24	15.6 (98)	St George	3	15	3	0	0	9
Kel O'Shea	Second-row	23	15.4 (97)	Western Suburbs	6	14	2	0	0	6
Bernie Purcell	Second-row	28	13.10 (87)	South Sydney	0	7	0	12	0	24
Don Furner	Second-row	23	14.7 (92)	Toowoomba Souths	1	11	0	3	0	6
Brian Davies	Prop	26	14.10 (93)	Brisbane Brothers	3	12	5	1	0	17
Roy Bull	Prop	26	15.5 (98)	Manly-Warringah	6	21	2	0	0	6
Bryan Orrock	Prop	25	15.7 (98)	St George	2	5	0	0	0	0
Bill Marsh	Prop	27	14.12 (94)	Cootamundra	2	17	5	0	0	15
Ken Kearney	Hooker	32	13.7 (86)	St George	6	19	2	1	0	8
Ernest Hammerton	Hooker	29	11.11 (75)	South Sydney	0	11	0	0	0	0

== Test Venues ==
The three Ashes series tests took place at the following venues.

Wigan	Bradford	Swinton
Central Park	Odsal Stadium	Station Road
Capacity: 48,000	Capacity: 60,000	Capacity: 40,000

== Match Results ==
The tour began in Great Britain with a series a matches, but the first Test Match of the tour was played against France in Paris. The tourists returned to Great Britain for more matches against English clubs and a three Test Match series against Great Britain. The team then returned to France to play a Second and Third Test against France (the fifth and sixth Tests of the tour), plus matches against club and other representative teams.

10 October	Liverpool Stanley	12–40	Australia	Mill Yard, Liverpool
3.00pm	Tries: 2 Greenhough; Hunt; Goals: 3 Wood (3)		Tries: 10; Don Adams (4); Denis Flannery (3); Kel O'Shea; Keith Holman; Bob Banks; Goals: 4 Clive Churchill (3); Brian Davies; Field Goals: 1 Clive Churchill	Attendance: 4,712; Gate: £ 595; Referee: C.F. Appleton

13 October	Leeds	18–13	Australia	Headingley, Leeds
3.00pm	Tries: 4 McLellan; Robinson; Pratt; Prior; Goals: 3 Dunn (3)		Tries: 3 Ian Moir (2); Keith Holman; Goals: 2 Gordon Clifford (2)	Attendance: 24,459; Gate: £ 3,483; Referee: R. Gelder

15 October	Hull F.C. / Hull Kingston Rovers XIII	14–37	Australia	Boothferry Park, Hull
7.15pm	Tries: 2 Gittoes; Coulson; Goals: 4 Buckle (4)		Tries: 9 Brian Davies (2); Ian Moir (2); Dick Poole (2); Denis Flannery; Roy Bull; Cyril Connell Jr. Goals: 4 Don Furner (3); Clive Churchill; Field goals: 1 Clive Churchill	Attendance: 17,172; Gate: £ 2,680; Referee: M. Coates

18 October	Barrow	11–25	Australia	Craven Park, Barrow
3.30pm	Tries: 3 Lewthwaite (2); Castle; Goals: 1 Ball		Tries: 5 Bob Banks; Don Adams; Bill Marsh; Dick Poole; Keith Holman; Goals: 4 Bernie Purcell (4); Field goals: 1 Clive Churchill	Attendance: 9,988; Gate: £ 1,102; Referee: Eric Clay

20 October	Whitehaven	14–11	Australia	Recreation Ground, Whitehaven
3.00pm	Tries: 2 Tembey; Smith; Goals: 4 McKeown (4)		Tries: 3 Bill Marsh; Denis Flannery; Cyril Connell Jr. Goals: 1 Clive Churchill	Attendance: 10,840; Gate: £ 1,253; Referee: R. Thomas

24 October	Bradford Northern	11–23	Australia	Odsal Stadium, Bradford
7.30pm	Tries: 3 Davies (3); Goals: 1 Seddon		Tries: 5 Des McGovern (2); Gordon Clifford; Bill Marsh; Cyril Connell Jr. Goals: 4 Gordon Clifford (4)	Attendance: 2,743; Gate: £ 451; Referee: N.T. Railton

27 October	Warrington	21–17	Australia	Wilderspool Stadium, Warrington
3.00pm	Tries: 5 Challinor (2); Gilfidder (2); Horton; Goals: 3 Bath (3)		Tries: 3 Dick Poole (2); Denis Flannery; Goals: 4 Bernie Purcell (4)	Attendance: 15,613; Gate: £ 2,163; Referee: G. Scott

29 October	Rugby League XIII	15–19	Australia	Kirkhall Lane, Leigh
7.30pm	Tries: 3 Shar; Pitchford; Bolton; Goals: 3 Jones (3)		Tries: 3 Des McGovern (2); Tom Tyquin; Goals: 5 Gordon Clifford (5)	Attendance: 7,811; Gate: £ 1,127; Referee: N.T. Railton

=== 1st Test vs France ===
1 November

France	8–15	Australia
Tries: 2 Augustin Parent; Jacky Merquey; Goals: 1 Andre Audy		Tries: 3 Keith Holman (2); Des McGovern; Goals: 3 Clive Churchill (2); Keith Holman

Parc des Princes, Paris
Attendance: 10,789
Gate: Fr 4,181,400
Referee: P. Ribas

France	Position	Australia
Andre Audy	FB	Clive Churchill
Maurice Voron	WG	Denis Flannery
Roger Rey	CE	Dick Poole
Jacky Merquey (c)	CE	Alex Watson
Andre Savonne	WG	Des McGovern
Auguste Ambert	SO	Bob Banks
Guy Lucia	SH	Keith Holman
François Rinaldi	PR	Roy Bull
Antranik Apelian	HK	Ken Kearney (c)
François Montrucolis	PR	Brian Davies
Robert Medus	SR	Bill Tyquin
Augustin Parent	SR	Norm Provan
Jean Rouqueirol	LF	Kel O'Shea

3 November	York	18–20	Australia	Wigginton Road, York
3.00pm	Tries: 4 Smith; Webster; Foster; Deighton; Goals: 3 Yorke (3)		Tries: 4 Ian Johnston (2); Brian Davies; Kevin O'Brien; Goals: 4 Bernie Purcell (4)	Attendance: 6,842; Gate: £ 897; Referee: A. Howgate

7 November	Oldham	21–2	Australia	Watersheddings, Oldham
3.00pm	Tries: 3 Pitchford; Etty; Turner; Goals: 6 Ganley (6)		Tries: nil Goals: 1 Cyril Connell Jr.	Attendance: 8,458; Gate: £ 1,268; Referee: T. Watkinson

10 November	Huddersfield	10–20	Australia	Fartown Ground, Huddersfield
3.00pm	Tries: 2 Fairbank; Sullivan; Goals: 2 Dyson (2)		Tries: 4 Brian Davies; Ian Moir; Tom Tyquin; Don Adams; Goals: 4 Gordon Clifford (4)	Attendance: 12,127; Gate: £ 1,699; Referee: A.E. Durkin

=== 1st Test vs Great Britain ===
17 November
2.30pm

Great Britain	21–10	Australia
Tries: 5 Billy Boston (2); Jack Grundy; Alan Davies; Mick Sullivan; Goals: 3 Frank Mortimer (3)		Tries: 2 Ian Moir; Dick Poole; Goals: 2 Keith Holman (2)

Central Park, Wigan
Attendance: 22,473
Gate: £ 4,844
Referee: Norman Railton (England)

Great Britain	Position	Australia
Frank Mortimer	FB	Clive Churchill
Billy Boston	WG	Ian Moir
Phil Jackson	CE	Dick Poole
Alan Davies	CE	Alex Watson
Mick Sullivan	WG	Don Adams
Raymond Price	SO	Bob Banks
Jeff Stevenson	SH	Keith Holman
Alan Prescott (c)	PR	Brian Davies
Tommy Harris	HK	Ken Kearney (c)
Brian Shaw	PR	Roy Bull
Jack Grundy	SR	Bill Tyquin
Don Robinson	SR	Bill Marsh
Edgar Dawson	LF	Kel O'Shea

21 November	Hunslet	11–27	Australia	Parkside, Hunslet
2.30pm	Tries: 1 Burnell; Goals: 4 Langton (4)		Tries: 5 Cyril Connell Jr. (2); Kevin O'Brien; Denis Flannery; Kel O'Shea; Goals: 6 Gordon Clifford (6)	Attendance: 4,451; Gate: £ 400; Referee: G. Wilson

24 November	St Helens	44–2	Australia	Knowsley Road St Helens
2.30pm	Tries: 10; Llewellyn (2); Gaskell; McCabe; Silcock; Karalius; Rhodes; Dickinson; Terry; Prescott; Goals: 7 Rhodes (7)		Tries: nil Goals: 1 Gordon Clifford	Attendance: 15,579; Gate: £ 1,931; Referee: F. Smith

=== 2nd Test vs Great Britain ===
1 December
2.30pm

Great Britain	9–22	Australia
Tries: 1 Jeff Stevenson; Goals: 3 Frank Mortimer (3)		Tries: 4 Keith Holman; Bob Banks; Brian Davies; Roy Bull; Goals: 5 Gordon Clifford (5)

Odsal Stadium, Bradford
Attendance: 23,634
Gate: £ 4,174
Referee: Matthew Coates (England)

Great Britain	Position	Australia
Frank Mortimer	FB	Gordon Clifford
Billy Boston	WG	Denis Flannery
Phil Jackson	CE	Alex Watson
Alan Davies	CE	Dick Poole
Mick Sullivan	WG	Des McGovern
Raymond Price	SO	Bob Banks
Jeff Stevenson	SH	Keith Holman
Alan Prescott (c)	PR	Brian Davies
Tommy Harris	HK	Ken Kearney (c)
Brian Shaw	PR	Roy Bull
Jack Grundy	SR	Kel O'Shea
Don Robinson	SR	Don Furner
Derek Turner	LF	Ian Doyle

5 December	Halifax	6–3	Australia	Thrum Hall, Halifax
2.30pm	Tries: nil Goals: 3 Owen (3)		Tries: 1 Ian Moir; Goals: nil	Attendance: 2,254; Gate: £ 280; Referee: J. Clapham

8 December	Wigan	4–32	Australia	Central Park, Wigan
2.30pm	Tries: nil Goals: 2 Ashton (2)		Tries: 6 Ian Doyle (2); Des McGovern; Alex Watson; Denis Flannery; Keith Holman; Goals: 7 Gordon Clifford (7)	Attendance: 15,854; Gate: £ 2,032; Referee: H. Harrison

10 December	Wakefield Trinity	17–12	Australia	Belle Vue, Wakefield
2.30pm	Tries: 3 Hirst; Rollin; Bullock; Goals: 4 Fox (4)		Tries: 2 Ian Johnston; Cyril Connell Jr. Goals: 3 Clive Churchill (3)	Attendance: 3,381; Gate: £ 309; Referee: G. Philpott

=== 3rd Test vs Great Britain ===
15 December
2.30pm

Great Britain	19–0	Australia
Tries: 5 Sid Little; Derek Turner; Geoff Gunney; Mick Sullivan; Billy Boston; Goals: 2 Alan Davies (2)		Tries: nil Goals: nil

Station Road, Swinton
Attendance: 17,542
Gate: £ 4,224
Referee: Frank Gelder (England)

Great Britain	Position	Australia
Glyn Moses	FB	Gordon Clifford
Billy Boston	WG	Denis Flannery
Phil Jackson	CE	Dick Poole
Alan Davies	CE	Alex Watson
Mick Sullivan	WG	Des McGovern
Raymond Price	SO	Bob Banks
Jeff Stevenson	SH	Keith Holman
Alan Prescott (c)	PR	Bryan Orrock
Tommy Harris	HK	Ken Kearney (c)
Sid Little	PR	Roy Bull
Jack Grundy	SR	Bill Tyquin
Geoff Gunney	SR	Kel O'Shea
Derek Turner	LF	Ian Doyle

18 December	French Army XIII	11–11	Australia	Palais des Sports, Limoges
	Tries: 1 Alberti; Goals: 4 Giriat (4)		Tries: 3 Don Adams; Kevin O'Brien; Ian Johnston; Goals: 1 Cyril Connell Jr.	Attendance: 3,153

20 December	Racing Club Albi XIII	20–25	Australia; Palais des Sports	Stade Maurice Rigaud, Albi
	Tries: 4 Verdier; Bessieres; Tounos; Berthomieu; Goals: 4 Galaup (4)		Tries: 5 Cyril Connell Jr. (2); Bob Banks (2); Ian Moir; Goals: 5 Cyril Connell Jr. (5)	Attendance: 3,789

=== 2nd Test vs France ===
23 December

France	6–10	Australia
Tries: nil Goals: 3 Gilbert Benausse (2); Andre Audy		Tries: 2 Denis Flannery; Keith Holman; Goals: 1 Gordon Clifford; Field goals: 1 Gordon Clifford

Parc Lescure, Bordeaux
Attendance: 11,379
Gate: Fr 4,150,000
Referee: P. Ribas

France	Position	Australia
Andre Audy	FB	Gordon Clifford
Maurice Voron	WG	Denis Flannery
Roger Rey	CE	Alex Watson
Antoine Jiminez	CE	Dick Poole
Andre Ducasse	WG	Don Adams
Gilbert Benausse	SO	Bob Banks
Jean Dop	SH	Keith Holman
Angélo Boldini	PR	Bryan Orrock
Antranik Apelian	HK	Ken Kearney (c)
Guy Berthomieu (c)	PR	Roy Bull
Gilbert Verdié	SR	Kel O'Shea
Armand Save	SR	Norm Provan
Christian Duple	LF	Ian Doyle

26 December	AS Carcassonne	12–26	Australia	Stade Albert Domec, Carcassonne
	Tries: 2 Marty; Husson; Goals: 3 Marty (3)		Tries: 6 Denis Flannery (3); Ian Johnston; Keith Holman; Cyril Connell Jr. Goals: 4 Cyril Connell Jr. (4)	Attendance: 3,493; Gate: Fr 922,200

31 December	XIII Catalan	14–20	Australia	Stade Jean-Laffon Perpignan
	Tries: nil Goals: 6 Puig Aubert (6); Field Goals: 1 Puig Aubert		Tries: 4 Ian Moir (2); Gordon Clifford; Tom Payne; Goals: 4 Gordon Clifford (4)	Attendance: 7,900; Gate: Fr 2,493,550; Referee: M. Roudine

=== 3rd Test vs France ===
3 January
3.00pm

France	21–25	Australia
Tries: 5 Andre Savonne (2); Jean Nerorezoff; Jacques Fabre; Jacky Merquey Goals: 3 André Rives (3)		Tries: 5 Dick Poole; Ian Moir; Ken Kearney; Tom Payne; Norm Provan; Goals: 4 Gordon Clifford (4); Field Goals: Bob Banks

Stade de Gerland, Lyon
Attendance: 5,743
Gate: Fr 1,580,150
Referee: Jean Banneau

France	Position	Australia
André Rives	FB	Gordon Clifford
Andre Savonne	WG	Denis Flannery
Antoine Jiminez	CE	Tom Payne
Roger Rey	CE	Dick Poole
Jean Nedorezoff	WG	Ian Moir
Jacky Merquey (c)	SO	Bob Banks
Claude Teisseire	SH	Keith Holman
Henri Delhoste	PR	Bill Marsh
Louis Michel	HK	Ken Kearney (c)
Jacques Fabre	PR	Roy Bull
Guy Berthomieu	SR	Norm Provan
Augustin Parent	SR	Kel O'Shea
Christian Duple	LF	Ian Doyle

6 January	Avignon	11–38	Australia	Parc des Sports, Avignon
3.00pm	Tries: 1 Savonne; Goals: 4 Pascal (4)		Tries: 10; Don Adams (2); Ian Moir (2); Ian Johnston (2); Norm Provan (2); Cyril Connell Jr. Bill Marsh; Goals: 4 Cyril Connell Jr. (4)	Attendance: 5,061; Gate: Fr 937,100; Referee: M. Casson

10 January	Marseille	7–37	Australia	Stade Vélodrome, Marseille
3.00pm	Tries: 1 Carmouze; Goals: 2 Andre (2)		Tries: 9 Kevin O'Brien (3); Don Adams (2); Bill Marsh; Tom Payne; Ken Kearney; Keith Holman; Goals: 5 Cyril Connell Jr. (2); Keith Holman (2); Ken Kearney	Attendance: 2,938; Gate: Fr 2,420,350
