= Connell (surname) =

Connell is a surname. Notable people with the name include:

- Brian Connell (born 1956), New Zealand politician
- Desmond Connell (1926–2017), Cardinal Archbishop of Dublin and Primate of Ireland
- Charles Connell (1810–1873), Canadian politician
- Charles Robert Connell (1864–1922), American politician from Pennsylvania
- Cyril Connell Sr. (1899–1974), rugby player, administrator and University registrar
- Cyril Connell Jr. (1928–2009), rugby player and scout
- Elizabeth Connell (1946–2012), South African-born operatic soprano
- Elizabeth Connell (doctor) (1925–2018), American doctor and proponent of women's reproductive health
- Evan S. Connell (1924–2013), American novelist
- Francis Jeremiah Connell (1888–1967), redemptorist, priest, theologian, academic
- George Connell (disambiguation), multiple people
- Gary Connell (born 1959), English rugby player
- James J. Connell (1939-1971), American naval aviator and Navy Cross recipient
- Jane Connell (1925–2013), American actress
- John Connell (1923–2015), American actor
- Joseph H. Connell (1923–2020), American ecologist
- Laurie Connell (1946–1996), Australian businessman and horse racing enthusiast
- Martin Connell (businessman), Canadian businessman and philanthropist
- Michael Connell (judge) (1939–2013), British barrister and judge
- Pat Connell, American politician
- Raewyn Connell (born 1944), Australian sociologist
- Richard Connell (1893–1949), American author, screenwriter, and journalist
- Richard E. Connell (1857–1912), American politician from New York
- Tony Connell (1944–2024), Scottish football player and coach
- William Connell (disambiguation), multiple people
