= Ken Kearney =

Australia dual-code rugby international footballer and coach

- Kearney circa 1952

Personal information
- Full name: Kenneth Howard Kearney
- Born: 3 May 1924 Penrith, New South Wales, Australia
- Died: 18 August 2006 (aged 82) Gold Coast, Queensland, Australia

Playing information

Rugby union
- Position: Hooker
Club
Years	Team	Pld	T	G	FG	P
1942–48	Parramatta
Representative
Years	Team	Pld	T	G	FG	P
1947–48	Australia	7

Rugby league
- Position: Hooker
Club
Years	Team	Pld	T	G	FG	P
1948–51	Leeds	95	2	0	0	6
1952–61	St. George	156	18	2	0	58
	Total	251	20	2	0	64
Representative
Years	Team	Pld	T	G	FG	P
1949–51	Other Nationalities	4	0	0	0	0
1952–58	New South Wales	17	4	0	0	12
1952–58	Australia	31	3	0	0	9

Coaching information
Club
Years	Team	Gms	W	D	L	W%
1954-55, 1957–61	St. George	141	113	2	26	80
1962–64	Parramatta	59	35	2	22	59
1965	Western Suburbs	18	6	0	12	33
1967–69	Cronulla-Sutherland	66	14	1	51	21
	Total	284	168	5	111	59
Representative
Years	Team	Gms	W	D	L	W%
1956–57	Australia	9	7	0	2	78
- Source: As of 10 January 2016

Kenneth Howard "Killer" Kearney (3 May 1924 – 18 August 2006) was an Australian rugby footballer – a dual-code international player – and a rugby league coach. He represented the Wallabies in seven Tests, and the Kangaroos in thirty-one Test matches and World Cup games. He captained Australia in nine rugby league Test matches in 1956 and 1957. He was a hooker and captain-coach with the St. George Dragons in the first half of their eleven-year consecutive premiership winning run from 1956 to 1966. He is considered one of Australia's finest footballers of the 20th century.

== Biography ==
Kearney was born in Penrith, New South Wales. He joined Parramatta's 1st grade rugby union side from school before serving in the Royal Australian Air Force in World War II and represented Combined Services in rugby union.

=== Rugby union career ===
After discharge from the Air Force he resumed playing rugby union in Australia and débuted for the Wallabies against the All Blacks playing two Tests in June 1947 then went on the 1947–48 Australia rugby union tour of Britain, Ireland, France and North America, playing against each of the five European rugby union nations.

=== Rugby league career ===
Kearney returned to England at the end of the Wallabies tour and switched to the professional code of rugby league. After three seasons with Leeds he returned to Australia in 1952 and joined St George. He was captain-coach between 1954 and 1955, and later between 1957 and 1961.

At the end of his first club rugby league season back in Australia with St George, Kearney was selected for the 1952 Kangaroo tour. Kearney's international rugby league début in Bradford on 13 December 1952 saw him become Australia's 24th dual code rugby international, following Len Smith, and preceding Rex Mossop. Kearney played in the 3rd Test against Great Britain, all three tests against France, and sixteen minor tour matches. He is listed on the Australian Players Register as Kangaroo No.302. He went on the 1953 tour of New Zealand playing in all three Tests and the following year represented in the 1954 Rugby League World Cup, the first ever, in France.

In 1956, the commencing year of the Dragons' record breaking run Norm Tipping had coached the team to an excellent season result of 15 wins, four losses and 1 draw but regardless would be ousted from the coaching job shortly after the grand final victory. He was the loser in a power struggle with Kearney, who led the side on-field and who that year had captained Australia to a three Test whitewash of New Zealand, had captained New South Wales to state victory over Queensland, won the Sunday Telegraph's Player of the Year award and ultimately captained St. George to premiership victory. The St George committee chose to back Kearney's fine football brain and his advanced strategies on attack, defence and conditioning in choosing him as their captain-coach to go forward. In the process they laid the foundation for the club's eleven-year premiership stranglehold. Following his premiership success with St George as both captain and coach, Kearney was selected as captain-coach of Australia for the 1956 trans-Tasman series against New Zealand with Clive Churchill unavailable due to injury. Australia won the series 3–0 to regain the trans-Tasman trophy that the Kiwis had held since 1935. Kearney stayed on a captain-coach for the 1956 Kangaroo tour in spite of the availability and tour selection of Churchill with whom he reportedly enjoyed an uneasy relationship. The touring side won all three Tests in France but lost against Great Britain 2–1. Kearney played in all Tests on tour.

Kearney played in an exceptionally talented Australian side who won the 1957 World Cup under captain Dick Poole, playing out one of the matches with a broken jaw. and the 1958 domestic Ashes series under captain Brian Davies before retiring from international football.

Kearney brought tactics and strategy from English rugby league and is often credited with masterminding the St. George Dragons successful run. He was able to inspire loyalty in his players by leading from the front and to develop a level of fitness and ruthless, mistake free football. This discipline was the foundation for the famous straight line brick-wall defence that kept the St George team at the top through those years. He played 156 games from 1952 to 1961, captained the club in five winning Grand Finals (as captain-coach for the latter four) and coached them to further victory in 1961.

=== Post-playing ===
After retiring as a player Kearney stayed on with St George as coach for the remainder of the 1961 NSWRFL season before resigning.

He then coached the Parramatta Eels to the semi-finals in 1962–1964. He coached the Western Suburbs Magpies club in 1965 and was the foundation coach for the Cronulla-Sutherland Sharks in their first three seasons, 1967–1969.

Kearney worked in insurance sales in Sydney for 25 years. He retired to the Gold Coast where he died in his home of a heart attack in 2006 aged 82.

== Accolades ==
He was awarded Life Membership of the St. George Dragons club in 1991.

In 2006 he was inducted into the Australian Rugby League Hall of Fame. In February 2008, Kearney was named in the list of Australia's 100 Greatest Players (1908–2007) which was commissioned by the NRL, and ARL to celebrate the code's centenary year in Australia. On 20 July 2022, Kearney was named in the St. George Dragons District Rugby League Clubs team of the century at hooker.

Sporting positions
Preceded by Clive Churchill	Captain Australia; 1956-57	Succeeded by Dick Poole
