= Tom Payne (rugby league) =

Australian rugby league footballer (1934–2023)

Personal information
- Full name: Lawrence Roy Payne
- Born: 30 December 1934
- Died: 30 September 2023 (aged 88)

Playing information
- Position: Centre
Representative
Years	Team	Pld	T	G	FG	P
1956–57	Queensland	5	1	0	0	3
1957	Australia	1	1	0	0	3

Lawrence Roy Payne (30 December 1934 – 30 September 2023) was an Australian rugby league footballer.

A Toowoomba centre, Payne was a Queensland representative player in 1956 and 1957. He also gained representative honours on the 1956–57 Kangaroo tour of Great Britain and France, debuting in the match against a combined Hull F.C. / Hull Kingston Rovers XIII. His sole international appearance came in the final international fixture against France in Lyon, when he scored a try while deputising for Alex Watson in a 25–21 Kangaroos win.

Payne was an elder brother of Queensland second–rower Jim Payne.
