= Hugh Drysdall =

Irish Anglican cleric

Hugh Drysdall, D.D. was an Anglican priest in Ireland during the seventeenth century.

Drysdall was educated at Trinity College, Dublin. He was ordained in 1661. A Vicar choral of the Cathedral Church of St Canice, Kilkenny he became Chancellor there in 1666. In 1668 he became Archdeacon of Ossory, holding the post until his death in 1692.
