= Henry Mainwaring (priest) =

17th century Anglican clergyman in Ireland

Henry Mainwaring was an Anglican priest in Ireland during the seventeenth century, and served as the Archdeacon of Ossory from 1610 to 1636.
