= Kel O'Shea =

Australia international rugby league footballer

Personal information
- Full name: Kelvin Joseph O'Shea
- Born: 13 July 1933 Ayr, Queensland, Australia
- Died: 22 January 2015 (aged 81) Redland Bay, Queensland, Australia

Playing information
- Position: Second-row
Club
Years	Team	Pld	T	G	FG	P
1953–55	Colts (Ayr)
1955	Souths (Brisbane)
1956–63	Western Suburbs	111	30	0	0	90
1965	Maitland
	Total	111	30	0	0	90
Representative
Years	Team	Pld	T	G	FG	P
1953–55	Queensland	8	0	0	0	0
1956–58	New South Wales	8	0	0	0	0
1954–58	Australia	20	7	0	0	21
1956–61	NSW City	3	0	0	0	0

Coaching information
Club
Years	Team	Gms	W	D	L	W%
1965	Maitland

Kelvin Joseph "Kel" O'Shea (13 July 1933 – 22 January 2015) was an Australian representative rugby league footballer, a second-rower from Queensland whose club career was played with the Western Suburbs Magpies in Sydney. He is rated among the nation's best players of the 20th century.

== Club career ==
O'Shea first came to prominence from Queensland in 1954 when while playing for Ayr Colts he was selected for Australia. He remained in Queensland for the 1955 season but in 1956 accepted an offer to move to Sydney to join the Western Suburbs Magpies who at that time were buying up a talent roster including Arthur Summons, Harry Wells, Dick Poole and Ian Moir in their pursuit of an elusive premiership title – an approach which earned the club their tag as "the Millionaires".

He played in three of the Magpies' four Grand final losses to St.George: 1958; 1961 and 1963.

O'Shea left Wests for Newcastle at the end of 1963 and came out of retirement in 1965 to captain-coach Maitland in 1965. Playing in the Newcastle Grand final he converted his club's winning try after the bell as spectators invaded the field.

== Representative career ==
He debuted for Australia in 1954 called into the forward pack to partner Norm Provan against the touring British Lions. Over the next four years, O'Shea and Provan formed a solid partnership that saw them represent against all of the rugby league playing nations.

O'Shea first represented for New South Wales in 1956 after moving to Wests. He played against New Zealand in 1956 Trans-Tasman series and at the end of that year was selected for the Kangaroos playing in all six Tests and eight minor matches of the 1956-57 Kangaroo tour.

He played against Great Britain in the 1954 World Cup campaign and in 1957 was a member of Australia's victorious World Cup squad. All up O'Shea made fifteen Test and five World Cup appearances for his country.

== Accolades ==
In 2004, O'Shea was named at second-row in the Western Suburbs Magpies team of the century.

In 2007, O'Shea was selected by a panel of experts at second-row in an Australian 'Team of the 50s'.

In February 2008, O'Shea was named in the list of Australia's 100 Greatest Players (1908–2007) which was commissioned by the NRL and ARL to celebrate the code's centenary year in Australia. In 2009, he was inducted into the Queensland Sport Hall of Fame for his achievements in Rugby League.

== Death ==
Kel O'Shea died on 22 January 2015, aged 81.

== Sources ==
- Andrews, Malcolm (2006) The ABC of Rugby League Austn Broadcasting Corporation, Sydney, AUS
- Whiticker, Alan & Hudson, Glen (2006) The Encyclopedia of Rugby League Players, Gavin Allen Publishing, Sydney, AUS
- Kelvin O'Shea profile, nqsports.com.au; Retrieved 10 September 2014.
