= William Connell (priest) =

William Connell was an Anglican priest in the mid-eighteenth century.

A graduate of Trinity College Dublin and Prebendary of Mayne, he was appointed Archdeacon of Ossory in 1758; and died on 27 March 1762.

Church of Ireland titles
Preceded by Henry Candler	Archdeacon of Ossory; 1758–1762	Succeeded by William Cockburne
