= Clydsdale =

Clydsdale is a surname. Notable people with the surname is:

- Adam Clydsdale (born 1993), Australian rugby league footballer
- Yasmin Clydsdale (born 1994), Australian rugby league and rugby union footballer
