= Bill Marsh (rugby league) =

Australia international rugby league footballer

Personal information
- Full name: William Lawrence Marsh
- Born: 23 April 1929 Sydney, New South Wales, Australia
- Died: 2 April 2002 (aged 72) Lurnea, New South Wales, Australia

Playing information
Club
| Years | Team | Pld | T | G | FG | P |
|---|---|---|---|---|---|---|
| 1950–55 | Balmain | 76 | 24 | 2 | 0 | 76 |
| 1956 | Cootamundra |
| 1957–60 | Balmain | 66 | 6 | 0 | 0 | 18 |
| | Total | 142 | 30 | 2 | 0 | 94 |
Representative
| Years | Team | Pld | T | G | FG | P |
| 1955–58 | New South Wales | 8 | 3 | 0 | 0 | 9 |
| 1956 | NSW Country | 1 | 0 | 0 | 0 | 0 |
| 1956–58 | Australia | 8 | 2 | 0 | 0 | 6 |
| 1958 | NSW City | 1 | 1 | 0 | 0 | 3 |

Bill Marsh (1929–2002) was an Australian professional rugby league footballer who played in the 1950s. A New South Wales interstate and Australia international representative forward, he played his club football in Sydney's NSWRFL Premiership for Balmain, who he also captained.

Marsh started playing for Balmain in the NSWRFL Premiership's first grade in 1950. He captained Balmain for the 1955 NSWRFL season. He was also selected to play for the New South Wales team against France and Queensland in 1955. He also won an award for being the best Sydney footballer that year.

After moving to Cootamundra as captain-coach in 1956, Marsh gained selection for the Country New South Wales team and then became Kangaroo No. 329 when he represented Australia on the 1956–57 Kangaroo tour of Great Britain and France, playing in Tests against Great Britain and France. Marsh returned to Balmain for the 1957 NSWRFL season and helped host country Australia to victory in the 1957 Rugby League World Cup tournament. During the 1958 Great Britain Lions tour Marsh was selected to play in the front row in the Australian Test team in all three Tests against the Ashes-winning Great Britain team.
