= Des McGovern =

Personal information
- Full name: Des V. McGovern
- Born: 13 February 1928; Toowoomba, Queensland
- Died: 8 February 2013 (aged 84); Toowoomba, Queensland

Playing information
- Position: Wing
Club
Years	Team	Pld	T	G	FG	P
19??–??	All Whites	69	15
19??–??	Newtown (Toowoomba)
	Total	69	15	0	0	0
Representative
Years	Team	Pld	T	G	FG	P
19??–??	Toowoomba		27
1949–56	Queensland	16	12	0	0	36
1952–56	Australia	7	1	0	0	3

Coaching information
Club
Years	Team	Gms	W	D	L	W%
	Toowoomba

Des V. McGovern (1928 - 2013) was an Australian professional rugby league footballer who played in the 1940s and 1950s. A Queensland state and Australia national representative winger, he played his club football in Toowoomba, where he later become a successful coach and well-known radio match commentator.

== Biography ==
Des McGovern was born in Toowoomba, Queensland on 13 February 1928. He was a student at Brisbane's Nudgee College.

=== Playing career ===
McGovern started playing rugby league football in Ipswich before moving to Toowoomba in 1947. He was first selected to represent Queensland in 1949. During the 1950s McGovern was a member of the Toowoomba Bulimba Cup teams, coached by Duncan Thompson. During the 1951 French rugby league tour of Australia and New Zealand McGovern was selected to play on the wing for Queensland in their match against the touring Frenchmen, which ended in a 22-all draw. In 1952 he first gained selection for the Australia national rugby league team, becoming Kangaroo No. 296. McGovern was selected as a winger for the 1952–53 Kangaroo tour. On the 1956–57 Kangaroo tour, he was selected to play in all three Test matches against Great Britain. McGovern retired having scored the most tries in the history of the Bulimba Cup with 27.

=== Post-playing ===
Following his playing days, McGovern became a successful coach in Queensland country regions and Toowoomba, where he coached the Clydesdales. He also worked as a rugby league writer for the Downs Star and The Chronicle. McGovern went on to become one of the Darling Downs region's best known radio sporting voices during a 36-year working partnership with broadcaster Pat O'Shea. The pair began their long association calling Toowoomba rugby league matches on radio station 4AK before moving to 4GR, 4WK and finally 102.7FM. From 1985 to 1987 McGovern was the president of Toowoomba's All Whites club. His son, Des McGovern, Jr. also played rugby league for the club. In 2008, rugby league in Australia's centenary year, McGovern was named on the wing of the Toowoomba and South West Team of the Century. McGovern retired from full-time commentary at the end of the 2010 season, aged 82. McGovern died on 8 February 2013 in St Andrew's Hospital, Toowoomba, five days short of his 85th birthday.
