= Waller de Montmorency =

Waller de Montmorency (b and d Knocktopher; 1841 – 1924) was an Anglican priest in the late nineteenth and early twentieth centuries, including Archdeacon of Ossory from 1911 until his death.

A graduate of Trinity College, Cambridge he was ordained in 1866. He was the incumbent at Kilsheelan; and Treasurer of St Canice's Cathedral, Kilkenny. He died on 25 October 1924.

His son, Geoffrey Fitzhervey de Montmorency, was a colonial administrator, twice Governor of the Punjab.
