= Bandy Adams =

Australian rugby league player (1934-2020)

Personal information
- Full name: Don Patrick Adams
- Born: 15 February 1934 Maitland, NSW, Australia
- Died: 4 March 2020 (aged 86) Scone, NSW, Australia

Playing information
- Position: Wing
Representative
Years	Team	Pld	T	G	FG	P
1955–59	NSW Country	5	4	0	0	12
1955–56	New South Wales	9	13	0	0	39
1956	Australia	5	5	0	0	15
- Relatives: David Adams (son); Adam Clydesdale (grandson); Jock Madden (great nephew)

Don Patrick "Bandy" Adams (15 February 1934 – 4 March 2020) was an Australian rugby league player.

Born in Maitland, Adams was a stocky winger known for his career as a player/coach across the Hunter Valley during the 1950s, 1960s and 1970s. He went by the nickname "Bandy" and made 191 appearances for his hometown side the Maitland Pickers. After making his first-grade debut for Maitland in a grand final at the age of 17, Adams began his representative career in 1955 with appearances for both New South Wales and NSW Country.

Adams was a member of the Australia team for all three of their 1956 home Test matches against New Zealand, scoring two tries on debut, including a last-minute match-winner. He followed this up with a hat-rick in the 3rd Test in Sydney. These performances helped him gain a place on the 1956–57 tour of Great Britain and France, where he featured in a further two Test matches and accumulated 11 tries from 15 tour fixtures.

As a coach, Adams had stints in charge of Gloucester, Scone, Muswellbrook and the Northern Division representative side, which included future international second-rower Noel Cleal.

Adams was the father of Manly and Balmain halfback David and grandfather of NRL hooker Adam Clydsdale. His brother's grandson is Brisbane Broncos halfback Jock Madden.
