= Adam Clydsdale =

Australian rugby league footballer

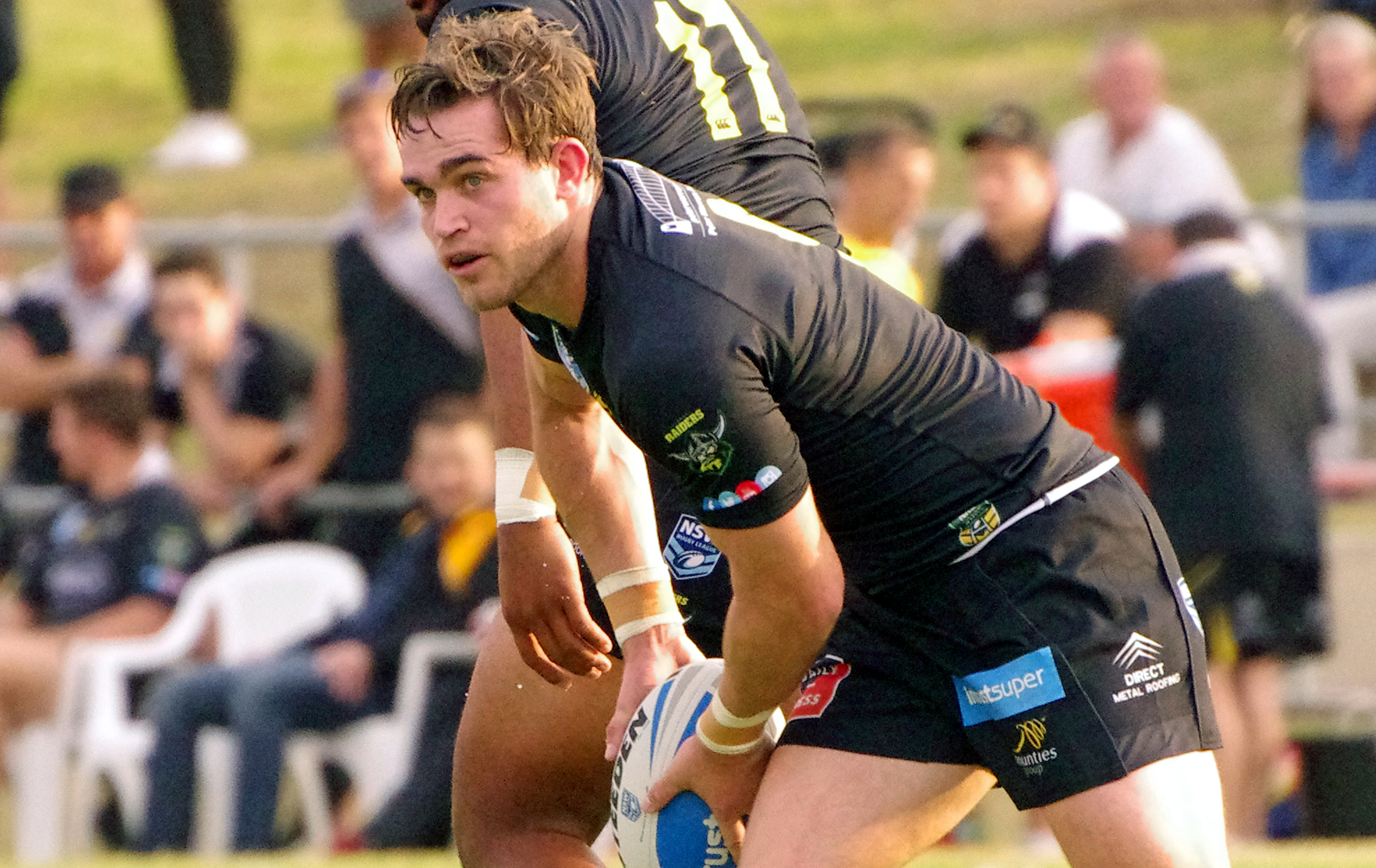
- Clydsdale playing for the Mounties in 2016

Personal information
- Born: 13 February 1993 (age 33) Scone, New South Wales, Australia
- Height: 178 cm (5 ft 10 in)
- Weight: 88 kg (13 st 12 lb)

Playing information
- Position: Hooker
Club
Years	Team	Pld	T	G	FG	P
2013–15	Newcastle Knights	40	4	0	0	16
2016–17	Canberra Raiders	15	0	0	0	0
2017	Cronulla Sharks	2	0	0	0	0
	Total	57	4	0	0	16
- Source: As of 26 October 2017
- Relatives: Bandy Adams (grandfather); David Adams (uncle); Jock Madden (cousin)

Adam Clydsdale (born 13 February 1993) is an Australian former professional rugby league footballer. In 2022, he played hooker for and was captain-coach of the Scone Thoroughbreds in the Newcastle Rugby League. He previously played for the Newcastle Knights, Canberra Raiders and Cronulla-Sutherland Sharks in the NRL. Clydsdale also played for the Maitland Pickers.

== Background ==
Born in Scone, New South Wales, Clydsdale played his junior rugby league for the Scone Thoroughbreds, before being signed by the Newcastle Knights.

Clydsdale is the grandson of Australian international Don "Bandy" Adams.

== Playing career ==
=== Early career ===
In 2009, Clydsdale played for the Newcastle Knights' Harold Matthews Cup team and won Newcastle's Harold Matthews Cup Player of the Year award. In 2011, he played in Newcastle's 2011 S. G. Ball Cup Grand Final win over the Canterbury-Bankstown Bulldogs, winning the Knights' S. G. Ball Cup Player of the Year award and Player's Player award. In 2012 and 2013, he played for the clubs NYC team. At the end of 2012, he won the clubs NYC Player of the Year award and Player's Player award. In November and December 2012, he attended the Blues Origin Pathways camp designed for possible future New South Wales State of Origin representatives.

=== 2013 ===
In 2013, Clydsdale captained Newcastle's NYC team. In round 9 of the 2013 NRL season, he made his NRL debut for the Newcastle club against the Canberra Raiders. On 10 May, he re-signed with the Knights on a 3-year contract after rejecting an offer from the Manly-Warringah Sea Eagles. He played in two matches for the Newcastle outfit in the 2013 season.

=== 2014 ===
On 15 February and 16 February, Clydsdale played for Newcastle in the inaugural NRL Auckland Nines. In Round 6 against the Canberra Raiders, he scored his first NRL try in Newcastle's 26–12 win at Canberra Stadium. He finished off the 2014 season having played in 21 matches and scoring two tries.

=== 2015 ===
On 31 January and 1 February, Clydsdale played for Newcastle in the 2015 NRL Auckland Nines. He finished off the 2015 season having played in 17 matches and scoring two tries. On 6 October, he signed a two-year contract with the Canberra Raiders starting in 2016, after being told he was free to look elsewhere by incoming Newcastle coach Nathan Brown.

=== 2016 ===
After signing with the Canberra Raiders, Clydsdale played the first 19 rounds in reserve grade before an ankle injury to Canberra Raiders' interchange bench utility Kurt Baptiste saw Clydsdale make his debut for the club in their 26—22 win over the New Zealand Warriors in round 20. Clydesdale only playing 11 minutes in that match. He then played in rounds 21 and 22, playing 13 and 20 minutes respectively before dropping out of the round 23 team when Baptiste returned. In round 23, hooker Josh Hodgson was put on report for a dangerous tackle meaning he would miss a week. Clydsdale was recalled into the team starting at hooker. He played 27 minutes before Kurt Baptiste came on for the rest of the match. Clydsdale did not play another first grade match during 2016. Clydsdale was a member of the Mount Pritchard Mounties side which was defeated 21-20 by the Illawarra Cutters in the 2016 Intrust Super Premiership NSW Grand Final.

=== 2017 ===
After playing 11 games for Canberra in 2017, Clydsdale was released from his contract to join the Cronulla-Sutherland Sharks effective immediately until the end of the season. He played two NRL games for Cronulla in 2017. After the season ended, he signed a new one-year contract to rejoin Canberra in 2018, only to announce his retirement from the NRL in November 2017 to pursue a career with his family business.

=== 2018 ===
In 2018, Clydsdale joined the Maitland Pickers in the Newcastle Rugby League.

=== 2019 ===
In 2019, Clydsdale played for the Scone Thoroughbreds and won the man of the match award in their 40-6 grand final win in the Group 21 Rugby League competition over the Aberdeen Tigers.
