= Gavin Quinn =

Australian rugby league footballer

Personal information
- Full name: Gavin Quinn
- Born: 4 June 1981 (age 45) Australia

Playing information
- Position: Wing
Club
Years	Team	Pld	T	G	FG	P
2003	Newcastle Knights	1	0	0	0	0
- Source: As of 15 Jul 2021

Gavin Quinn is an Australian former professional rugby league footballer who played in the 2000s. He played for the Newcastle Knights in 2003.

He won the Newcastle Rugby League grand final in 2010 with the Maitland Pickers.
