= Bob Banks =

Australia international rugby league footballer (1930–2024)

Bobby Banks
Personal information
- Full name: Robert Marjoribanks
- Born: 15 June 1930; Tumut, New South Wales, Australia
- Died: 10 July 2024 (aged 94)

Playing information
- Position: Five-eighth, Centre
Club
Years	Team	Pld	T	G	FG	P
1950	Easts (Sydney)	18	5	0	0	15
1951	Charters Towers
1952–58	Newtown (Toowoomba)
1955–55	Waratah Mayfield
1956–57	Rockhampton
1959–60	Cunnamulla
1961–62	Cairns
1963–63	Tully
	Total	18	5	0	0	15
Representative
Years	Team	Pld	T	G	FG	P
1951	North Queensland
1952–62	Queensland	26	1	0	0	3
1953–62	Australia	15	2	1	0	8
Medals
Men's rugby league
Representing Australia
Rugby League World Cup
Bronze medal – third place	1954 France	Team

Robert Marjoribanks (15 June 1930 – 10 July 2024), known professionally as Bob Banks, was an Australian rugby league footballer, a Queensland state and national representative five-eighth, who made fourteen Test and nineteen other tour match appearances for the Australian national team between 1953 and 1962. He represented his adopted state of Queensland on twenty-six occasions during his career.

== Early life ==
Banks was born in Tumut, New South Wales but in his childhood, he had relocated to the Newcastle area, from where his family originated, attending Hamilton Primary and Central High School, Newcastle where he represented in rugby league. He began his senior league career in the Newcastle competition before moving to Sydney in 1950 where he played with the Eastern Suburbs club.

== Playing career ==
After his first top-grade season with Eastern Suburbs in 1950, Banks moved to Charters Towers in Queensland. While there he was selected to represent for Northern Queensland against France, the first touring French Test side to visit Australia. In 1952 he made his state representative debut for Queensland, establishing a place in the team until 1962.

Banks was selected for the national Australian team in 1953, touring New Zealand before playing in the 1954 Ashes series. Banks took part in three Ashes series - 1954, 1956–1957 and 1962 - and he also participated in the inaugural World Cup competition in 1954.

In 1959, Banks played in the Queensland victory over New South Wales that attracted 35,261 spectators, smashing Brisbane's previous record for an interstate match of 22,817.

Banks captained Queensland for two years, 1959 and 1960. In 1953 he captain-coached Northern Queensland, winning the state competition. He retired in 1963.

The Gregory's reference published contemporaneously to his career, reports that he was not a speedy player, but a great field general, ball distributor and grand defender. Whilst equally at home at five-eighth or centre his teammates preferred him to occupy the pivot spot to benefit from his on-field organisational skills.

On 24 October 2000, Banks was awarded the Australian Sports Medal for his rugby league achievements.

In 2008, rugby league in Australia's centenary year, Banks was named at five-eighth in the Toowoomba and South West Team of the Century.

== Death ==
Banks died on 10 July 2024, at the age of 94.
