= Henry Candler =

Henry Candler (1688–1758) was an Anglican priest in Ireland in the eighteenth century.

Candler was born in Callan, County Kilkenny. He entered Trinity College, Dublin in 1718 and graduated B.A. in 1722. Candler was appointed Archdeacon of Ossory in 1736, and held the post until his death.
