= Ian Doyle =

Australian RL coach and former Australia international rugby league footballer

Personal information
- Born: 21 March 1932 Toowoomba, Queensland
- Died: 7 September 1999 (aged 67)

Playing information
- Position: Lock
Club
Years	Team	Pld	T	G	FG	P
1950–59	All Whites	92
Representative
Years	Team	Pld	T	G	FG	P
1956–58	Queensland	7	1	2	0	7
1956–57	Australia	7	0	0	0	0

Coaching information
Club
Years	Team	Gms	W	D	L	W%
1959–67	All Whites
Representative
Years	Team	Gms	W	D	L	W%
1965–67	Queensland	8	0	0	8	0

Ian Doyle (1932–1999), also known by the nickname of "Ripper", was an Australian professional rugby league footballer who played in the 1950s, and coached in the 1960s. A Queensland state and Australia national representative lock, he played in the Toowoomba Rugby League for the All Whites club. His older brother, Joe Doyle, previously played rugby league for Australia also.

Ian Doyle was born in Toowoomba, Queensland on 21 March 1932. He started playing football in the Toowoomba Rugby League with the All Whites club in 1950. Doyle was first selected to play for Queensland in the 1956 series against New South Wales. Later that year he was first selected to play for the Australian national team against the touring New Zealand team, becoming Kangaroo No. 321. He was then selected to go on the 1956–57 Kangaroo tour of Great Britain and France.

Doyle stayed with the All Whites club as their first grade coach after he finished playing in 1959. In 1965 he was selected to coach the Queensland Maroons, which he did until 1967 when he resigned from coaching. Doyle died at the age of 67 on 7 September 1999.

In 2008, rugby league in Australia's centenary year, Doyle was named on the bench of the Toowoomba and South West Team of the Century. He was also named at lock forward in the Toowoomba Brothers/All Whites team of the century.

Sporting positions
Preceded by Eric Harris; 1964	Coach Queensland; 1965–1967	Succeeded by Des Crow; 1968–1970
