= Dick Poole (rugby league) =

Australian rugby league footballer (1930–2025)

Personal information
- Full name: Herbert Richard Poole
- Born: 27 November 1930 Surry Hills, New South Wales, Australia
- Died: 6 June 2025 (aged 94) Ashfield, New South Wales, Australia

Playing information
- Position: Centre, Wing, Five-eighth
Club
Years	Team	Pld	T	G	FG	P
1950–58	Newtown	133	51	0	0	153
1959–60	Western Suburbs	31	8	0	0	24
	Total	164	59	0	0	177
Representative
Years	Team	Pld	T	G	FG	P
1954–57	New South Wales	10	7	0	0	27
1955–57	Australia	13	5	0	0	15

Coaching information
Club
Years	Team	Gms	W	D	L	W%
1955–58	Newtown	76	45	0	31	59
1966–68	Newtown	67	21	4	42	31
	Total	143	66	4	73	46
Representative
Years	Team	Gms	W	D	L	W%
1957	Australia	3	3	0	0	100
- Source: As of 10 January 2016

Herbert Richard Poole (27 November 1930 – 6 June 2025) was an Australian rugby league footballer and coach. He was a centre for the Australian national team. He played in ten Tests and three World Cup games between 1955 and 1957, as captain on three occasions. He was the oldest living Australian representative rugby league player at the time of his death in June 2025, at the age of 94.

== Background ==
Herbert Richard Poole was born in Surry Hills on 27 November 1930.

== Club career ==
Poole played junior football at the De La Salle school in Marrickville and then with the Earlwood Christian Youth Organisation before being graded with Newtown in 1949. Initially he played mainly in reserve grade with occasional first grade appearances up until 1952 when he established himself as a centre in the top grade.

Poole was captain-coach of Newtown in 1955 when they went down by one point to South Sydney in the Grand Final. He played 133 games for Newtown over nine seasons till 1958, the last four seasons as captain-coach. In 1959 he moved to the Western Suburbs Magpies for his last two seasons.

Poole in action

== Representative career ==
Poole first represented New South Wales in 1954. Following his Kangaroo Tour appearances of 1957 he was selected as captain-coach of New South Wales in 1957.

Poole made his Australian Test debut in 1955 in the series against France after having initially been picked as a reserve for the squad. His last minute call up was for the third Test played in Sydney in July 1955. He was selected for the three Tests of 1956 against New Zealand and then for the 1956–57 Kangaroo Tour of England and France. He appeared in six Tests and 11 minor tour matches scoring 17 tries in all.

In 1957, he was a surprise selection as captain-coach ahead of the more experienced Ken Kearney in the squad for the World Cup tournament to be played in Australia. Poole's side included magnificent players such as Brian Carlson, Norm Provan, Kel O'Shea, Kearney and Brian Clay and they swept all before them. Poole enjoyed a record of three times captaining his country for three victories.

== Post playing ==
At the end of his playing career Poole returned to Newtown as coach from 1966 to 1968. In 2008, the centenary year of rugby league in Australia, Poole was named in the Newtown Jets 18-man team of the century.

Poole died in Ashfield on 6 June 2025, at the age of 94.

== Matches played ==
Team	Matches	Years	Points
Newtown	133	1950–58	168
Wests	31	1959–60	27
New South Wales	15	1954–1957	27
Australia (Tests & World Cup)	13	1955–1957	15

Sporting positions
Preceded by Ken Kearney	Captain Australia; 1957	Succeeded by Brian Davies
