= David Adams (rugby league) =

Australian rugby league footballer

Personal information
- Full name: David Audley Adams
- Born: 5 January 1957 (age 69) Sydney, New South Wales, Australia

Playing information
- Position: Five-eighth, Halfback
Club
Years	Team	Pld	T	G	FG	P
1977–79	Manly Sea Eagles	6	0	0	0	0
1980	Balmain Tigers	3	1	0	0	3
	Total	9	1	0	0	3
- Father: Bandy Adams
- Relatives: Adam Clydesdale (nephew); Jock Madden (nephew)

David Adams (born 5 January 1957) is an Australian former rugby league footballer. He played for the Manly Warringah Sea Eagles and the Balmain Tigers in the NSWRL, as a halfback.

== Background ==
David Adams was born in Sydney, New South Wales, Australia.
