= Cyril Connell Jr. =

Australia international rugby league footballer

Personal information
- Born: 4 May 1928; Rockhampton, Queensland, Australia
- Died: 9 June 2009 (aged 81); Brisbane, Queensland, Australia

Playing information
- Position: Five-eighth, Centre
Club
Years	Team	Pld	T	G	FG	P
1947–49	Brothers (Rockhampton)
1950	Newtown (Toowoomba)
	Total	0	0	0	0	0
Representative
Years	Team	Pld	T	G	FG	P
1952–57	Queensland	24				42
1956	Australia (Tests)	2	0	0	0	0
	Australia(Tour match)	10				64
- Father: Cyril Connell Sr.

Cyril Connell (born 4 May 1928 in Rockhampton, Queensland, died 9 June 2009 in Brisbane, Queensland) was an Australian rugby league footballer who played in the 1940s and 1950s. An Australian international and Queensland Maroons representative centre/five-eighth, he played his club football in Toowoomba and Rockhampton. At the time of his death, he had been a recruitment scout for the Brisbane Broncos club of the NRL for several years. He was also the son of former rugby league footballer and administrator Cyril Connell Sr.

== Biography ==
=== Playing career ===
A similar build to the diminutive Clive Churchill, Connell Junior debuted for Rockhampton Brothers in 1947. He linked with Toowoomba's Newtown team in 1950 where, under the guidance of noted coach Duncan Thompson, he secured a Queensland jumper. He wore the maroon jumper 25 times between 1952 and 1957.

Connell played for the Toowoomba rugby league team against the visitors of the 1953 American All Stars tour of Australia and New Zealand and the 1954 Great Britain Lions tour.

Connell reached the pinnacle as a player when selected for Australia against New Zealand in 1956. He was elected for Australia again for the 1956–57 Kangaroo tour of Great Britain and France. While he failed to play a Test match against Great Britain, he played in 14 tour matches in England and France, captaining the Australian team many times.

=== Scouting ===
Connell was a secondary school maths teacher at Brisbane State High School, where he befriended student and future rugby league player and administrator Paul Morgan. Connell worked his way up to deputy director of secondary education in Queensland. During the 1970s Connell also worked as a rugby league commentator for ABC Radio in Queensland.

In 1990, Connell was chosen by Brisbane Broncos founding chairman, Paul Morgan, to be a recruitment officer for the Broncos. Connell found countless young players for the Broncos, notably including Shane Webcke, Tonie Carroll, Petero Civoniceva, Darren Lockyer, Wendell Sailor, Lote Tuqiri, Shaun Berrigan, Brent Tate and Karmichael Hunt, all of whom represented Queensland at State of Origin level.

In 2007, the main training facility for the Brisbane Broncos, the Cyril Connell High Performance Centre, was named after him due to his years of service to the club. He died in 2009.
