= Jock Madden =

Australian rugby league footballer

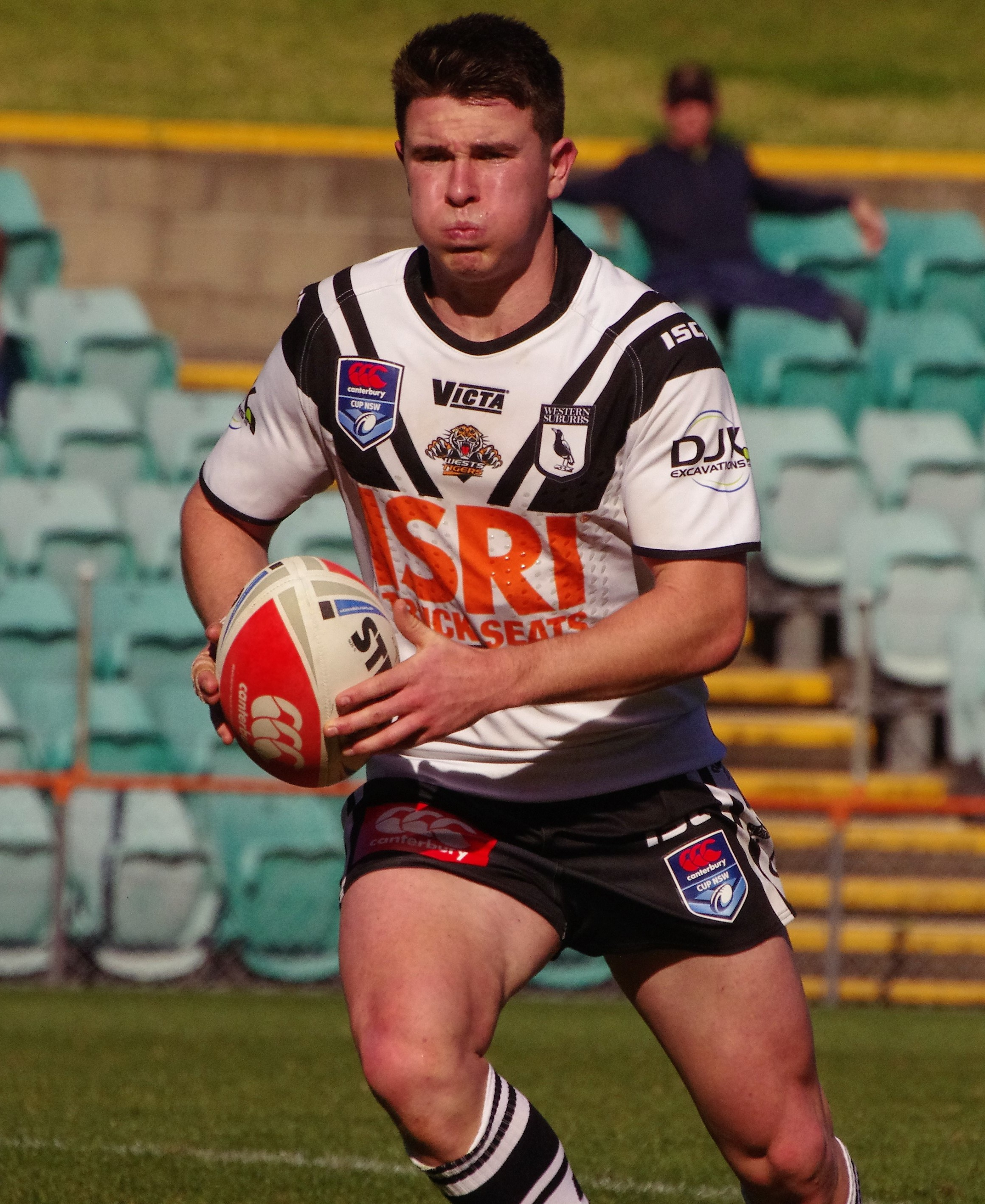

Personal information
- Born: 7 March 2000 (age 26) Scone, New South Wales, Australia
- Height: 180 cm (5 ft 11 in)
- Weight: 85 kg (13 st 5 lb)

Playing information
- Position: Halfback, Five-eighth
Club
Years	Team	Pld	T	G	FG	P
2021–22	Wests Tigers	17	3	4	0	20
2023–25	Brisbane Broncos	15	2	5	1	19
2026–	Wests Tigers	15	1	32	1	69
	Total	47	6	41	2	108
Representative
Years	Team	Pld	T	G	FG	P
2026	Prime Minister's XIII	1	0	0	0	0
- Source: As of 24 October 2026
- Relatives: Bandy Adams (great uncle); David Adams (uncle); Adam Clydesdale (cousin)

Jock Madden (born 7 March 2000) is an Australian professional rugby league footballer who plays as a halfback or five-eighth for the Wests Tigers in the National Rugby League (NRL).

He previously played for the Brisbane Broncos in the NRL.

== Background ==
Madden played his junior rugby league for the Scone Thoroughbreds. He is a great-nephew of Australian representative Don "Bandy" Adams.

In 2018, Madden represented and Captained the Australian Schoolboys while attending All Saints College, Maitland.

== Career ==
=== 2021 ===
Madden made his debut in round 10 of the 2021 NRL season for the Wests Tigers against the Newcastle Knights.

=== 2022 ===
Madden played a total of 14 games for the Wests Tigers in the 2022 NRL season as the club claimed the Wooden Spoon for the first time. At the end of the season, he signed for Brisbane.

=== 2023 ===
Madden played five games for Brisbane in the 2023 NRL season but did not feature in the clubs finals campaign nor the 2023 NRL Grand Final loss against Penrith.

=== 2024 ===
In round 8 of the 2024 NRL season, Madden scored two tries for Brisbane in their 34-10 victory over the Wests Tigers. In round 11, Madden kicked the winning field goal for Brisbane in their narrow 13-12 victory over Manly. Madden was limited to only ten appearances for Brisbane in the 2024 NRL season which saw the club miss the finals finishing 12th on the table.

=== 2025 ===
On 25 July, it was announced that Madden would depart Brisbane at the end of the season and return to the Wests Tigers after signing a two-year deal.

=== 2026 ===
Madden was Wests Tigers' second highest point-scorer for the season, with 69 points scored. He was also 4th in the competition for line-engagements, despite playing in only 14 games.

He made his Prime Minister's XIII début on 3 October 2026 in the 10-60 win over PNG Prime Minister's XIII in Port Moresby.

== Statistics ==
Year	Team	Games	Tries	Goals	FGs	Pts
2021	Wests Tigers	3				
2022	Wests Tigers	14	3	4		20
2023	Brisbane Broncos	5				
2024	Brisbane Broncos	10	2	5	1	19
2026	Wests Tigers	15	1	32	1	69
2027	Wests Tigers					
	Totals	47	6	41	2	108
