= Gordon Clifford =

Gordon Clifford may refer to:

- Gordon Clifford (rugby league)
- Gordon Clifford (lyricist)
