= Geoffrey Fitzhervey de Montmorency =

Anglo-Irish colonial administrator

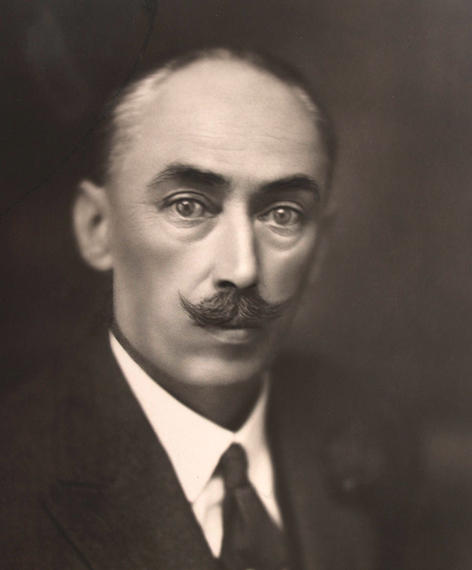
Former Governor of Punjab

Sir Geoffrey Fitzhervey de Montmorency, GCIE, KCSI, KCVO, CBE (23 August 1876 – 25 February 1955) was an Anglo-Irish colonial administrator. He was Governor of the Punjab, and established the De'Montmorency College of Dentistry in 1928, which was named after him.

== Work ==
He was born in the townland of Castlemorris, near Knocktopher, in County Kilkenny, to Waller de Montmorency, a Church of Ireland clergyman, and Mary O'Brien. He is buried in the Parish of the Ascension Burial Ground in Cambridge.

He was appointed a Knight Commander of the Order of the Indian Empire (KCIE) in the 1926 Birthday Honours, when he was Private Secretary to the Viceroy.
