= Maitland Pickers =

Australian rugby league club, based in Maitland, NSW

Club information
- Full name: Maitland Pickers; Rugby League; Football Club
- Colours: Black; Green; White
- Founded: 1955; 70 years ago

Current details
- Ground: Maitland Sportsground
- Competition: Newcastle Rugby League

The Maitland Pickers Rugby League Football Club is an Australian rugby league football club based in Maitland, New South Wales formed in 1955. They currently play in the Newcastle Rugby League competition. Their nickname was originally the Pumpkin Pickers but is now abbreviated to just the Pickers.

== History ==
The Maitland Pumpkin Pickers were formed from a merger of Maitland United and Morpeth-East Maitland in the 1942 season after Maitland City struggled to field teams. During the 1940s, Newcastle Rugby League experienced a drastic change when the league was reduced from 10 to 8 teams after Morpeth-East Maitland made a departure at the start of the 1942 season and Eastern Suburbs folding before the semi-finals. It was decided the defunct Morpeth-East Maitland, would merge to form the Maitland Pumpkin Pickers. In 1933, Maitland won their maiden premiership.

The dominance began in the 1950s when Australian Representative, Don Adams led Maitland played in seven consecutive grand finals, winning three premierships in a row from 1956 to 1958. In the late 1960s and early 1970s, the Pickers continued to dominate, having made it to the grand final five consecutive years (three titles and two runners-ups).

In the early 2010s, Maitland found another period of success winning back-to-back premierships beating Cessnock 24–8 in 2010 and beating Western Suburbs 19–18. The Pickers were also minor premiers in two consecutive seasons between 2010 and 2011.

2015 and 2016 were difficult years for the club finishing with the wooden spoon in consecutive years, winning 3 out of 14 games in 2015 whilst concluding the 2016 season picking up only 1 win.

Maitland Pickers had a huge resurgence, winning the Newcastle Rugby League between 2022-2025, the first team in the competition's history to win four premierships in a row. They also won two Presidents Cup competitions, in 2022 and 2023.

== Name Origin ==
The term "Pumpkin Pickers" was a sarcastic reference to the players bringing goods to the markets to sell when they went to games by train.

== Notable Juniors ==
- Greg Bird
- Luke Dorn
- Peter Dimond
- Andrew Everingham
- Brad Miles
- John Graves
- Chris Houston
- Marvin Karawana
- Kel O'Shea
- Gavin Quinn
- Terence Seu Seu
- Frank Stanmore
- Ryan Stig
- Mark Taufua
- Sione Tovo
- Brock Lamb
- Terry Pannowitz
- Jim Morgan
- Pasami Saulo
