= Denis Flannery =

Australia international rugby league player

Personal information
- Full name: Denis James Flannery
- Born: 2 April 1928
- Died: 12 February 2012 (aged 83) Raceview, Queensland, Australia

Playing information
- Height: 183 cm (6 ft 0 in)
- Weight: 82.5 kg (13 st 0 lb)
- Position: Wing
Club
Years	Team	Pld	T	G	FG	P
1947–58	Brothers (Ipswich)
Representative
Years	Team	Pld	T	G	FG	P
1948–56	Queensland	31	20	0	0	60
1950–57	Australia	15	4	0	0	12
	Toowoomba		24

Denis Flannery (1928 – 2012), also known by the nickname of "Flag Pole", was an Australian rugby league footballer who played in the 1940s and 1950s. An Australian international and Queensland interstate representative winger, he played his club football in the Ipswich Rugby League for the Brothers club. He has been recognised as one of Queensland's greatest ever players

== Biography ==
Flannery was born on 2 April 1928. He attended St. Joseph's Nudgee College and became a schoolboy sprint champion.

=== Playing career ===
Flannery started playing football in the Ipswich Rugby League for the Brothers club. Although prone to injury, he made his debut for Queensland in 1948 and won his first Australian cap in the second Ashes Test of 1950, when Australia beat Great Britain 15–3 at the Brisbane Cricket Ground. He is listed on the Australian Players Register as Kangaroo No. 279. Flannery also played Test football in 1951 and 1952. During the 1951 French rugby league tour of Australia and New Zealand, Flannery played in Australia's victory in the second Test. On the 1952-53 Kangaroo tour, he scored 23 tries in 14 games, including hat-tricks against Featherstone Rovers, Doncaster and Hull Kingston Rovers.

In 1954 rugby football's first World Cup tournament was to be played in France. While playing as a three-quarter back for Ipswich's Brothers club, Flannery was selected for the Australia's 1954 Rugby League World Cup squad which failed to make the final. He continued to represent Queensland and Australia until 1956, retiring from representative football after the 1956–1957 Kangaroo tour. In total, he played 15 international games for Australia, including two World Cup games. Flannery continued with Ipswich Brothers, serving as player-coach in 1957 and 1958 before retiring at the age of 30.

=== Post-playing ===
Flannery married Norma Dempsey, daughter of the former rugby great Dan Dempsey. Flannery and his wife ran the Ulster Hotel in Ipswich, formerly owned by Dan Dempsey, for 58 years. Their son, Denis, died of a childhood disease in 1970.

In June 2008, the centenary year of rugby league in Australia, Flannery was named on the wing of the Queensland Rugby League's Team of the Century, recognised for his "sweet side-step and swerve".

Flannery died in his Flinders View, Queensland nursing home on Sunday, 12 February 2012, aged 83.
