= William Connell =

William Connell may refer to:

- William Connell (priest) (died 1762), Anglican priest
- William Connell (Australian politician) (1891–1945), member of the Tasmanian House of Assembly
- William Connell (Pennsylvania politician) (1827–1909), U.S. Representative from Pennsylvania
- William James Connell (1846–1924), U.S. Representative from Nebraska
- William J. Connell (historian) (born 1958), American historian
- William J. McConnell (1839–1925), U.S. Senator and Governor of Idaho
