= Frank Mortimer =

GB international rugby league footballer

Personal information
- Full name: Frank Mortimer
- Born: 23 February 1932; Streethouse, Wakefield, England
- Died: 4 March 2009 (aged 77); Leeds, England

Playing information
- Position: Fullback, Centre
Club
Years	Team	Pld	T	G	FG	P
1951–59	Wakefield Trinity	174	33	378	0	855
≥1959–≥59	Keighley
	Total	174	33	378	0	855
Representative
Years	Team	Pld	T	G	FG	P
1955–56	Yorkshire	2	0	8	0	16
1956	Great Britain	2	0	6	0	12

Frank Mortimer (23 February 1932 – 4 March 2009) was an English professional rugby league footballer who played in the 1950s and 1960s. He played at representative level for Great Britain and Yorkshire, and at club level for Streethouse ARLFC, Wakefield Trinity and Keighley, as a fullback, or centre.

== Background ==
Mortimer was born in Streethouse, Wakefield, West Riding of Yorkshire. His birth was registered during the second quarter in Pontefract district, West Riding of Yorkshire, England. He worked as a colliery surveyor and was the treasurer of Streethouse Cricket Club. He died aged 77 of cancer in St James's University Hospital, Leeds, West Yorkshire. His funeral service took place at the Church of St Luke the Evangelist, 6 Cow Lane, Sharlston at 10.30am on Monday 16 March 2009. His committal took place at Pontefract Crematorium, Wakefield Road, Pontefract at 11.00am, followed by a reception at Streethouse Cricket Club. The 'Frank Mortimer Award' is presented annually to those making an outstanding contribution to Streethouse Cricket Club.

== Playing career ==
=== Club career ===
Mortimer was signed by Wakefield Trinity in May 1948, and he made his début playing at centre in the 18–17 victory over Leeds in the Yorkshire Cup semi-final during the 1951–52 season at Headingley, Leeds on Monday 8 October 1951, in front of crowd of 22,300, he played his last match for Wakefield Trinity during the 1958–59 season, he is 4th on Wakefield Trinity's all-time goal kicking table, and 5th on Wakefield Trinity's all-time points scoring table.

Mortimer played in Wakefield Trinity's victory Yorkshire League during the 1958–59 season.

Mortimer played fullback, and scored four goals in Wakefield Trinity's 23–5 victory over Hunslet in the 1956 Yorkshire Cup Final during the 1956–57 season at Headingley, Leeds on Saturday 20 October 1956, and played fullback, and scored two goals in the 20–24 defeat by Leeds in the 1958 Yorkshire Cup Final during the 1958–59 season at Odsal Stadium, Bradford on Saturday 18 October 1958.

=== Representative honours ===
Mortimer played fullback, and scored three conversions in Great Britain's 21–10 victory over Australia in the first 1956 Ashes Test Match at Central Park, Wigan on Saturday 17 November 1956, and scored three goals in Great Britain's 9–22 defeat by Australia in the second 1956 Ashes Test Match at Odsal Stadium, Bradford on Saturday 1 December 1956.

Mortimer was selected for Yorkshire County XIII whilst at Wakefield Trinity during the 1955–56 season and 1956–57 season.
