= Alex Watson (rugby league) =

Australia international rugby league footballer

Personal information
- Born: 10 October 1931
- Died: 5 June 2002 (aged 70)

Playing information
- Position: Three-quarter back
Club
Years	Team	Pld	T	G	FG	P
19??–57	Wests (Brisbane)
1958	Sarina
	Total	0	0	0	0	0
Representative
Years	Team	Pld	T	G	FG	P
1951–57	Queensland	20	2	0	0	6
1954–57	Australia	24	10	0	0	0

Alex Watson (10 October 1931 – 5 June 2002) was an Australian professional rugby league footballer who played in the 1950s. An Australian international and Queensland interstate representative three-quarter back, he played club football in the Brisbane Rugby League premiership for Western Suburbs.

Watson first represented Queensland in 1951 in a match against New South Wales. He made his test debut at the Sydney Cricket Ground on 12 June 1954 against Great Britain in the first test of that year's Ashes series. Australia won this test 37–12.

In 1953 Watson toured New Zealand with the Australian team.

In the 1954 Brisbane Rugby League Grand Final Watson scored two tries and kicked four goals before fracturing his left collarbone about ten minutes after the start of the second half and leaving the field. His team, Western Suburbs, went on to win the game. He then travelled to France to play in the inaugural World Cup.

In 1956 New Zealand toured Australia and in the last test match played at the Gabba, Watson scored the decisive try, a forty-metre effort that gave Australia their first series victory at home against the Kiwis since 1909. In that year's premiership semi-final Watson was suspended for two weeks for using abusive language and refusing to leave the field when ordered to by the referee.

Watson played his last match for Australia during the 1957 World Cup. That year he also played his last game for the Maroons. Watson then moved north to play for Sarina in 1958.
