= Francis Jeremiah Connell =

Redemptorist priest, professor, author, and Catholic American theologian

Francis Jeremiah Connell, C.Ss.R. (January 31, 1888 - May 12, 1967), was a Redemptorist priest, professor, author, and noted Catholic American theologian. He was born in Boston, Massachusetts, and died in Washington, D.C.

== Early life ==
Born to Timothy and Mary (née Sheehan), Francis attended the Boston public school system from 1893 to 1901. From 1901 to 1905, he attended Boston Latin School.

After graduating, Connell won a scholarship to the Jesuit Boston College and attended for 2 years. He was thinking of the priesthood, but did not want to spend priesthood teaching in the classroom as was usually the case for academically gifted Jesuits. Thus, in 1907 Connell joined the Congregation of the Most Holy Redeemer, better known as the Redemptorists.

Connell spent his novitiate year at the Redemptorist house in Annapolis, Maryland, after which he was sent to Mount St. Alphonsus Seminary in Esopus, New York to study philosophy and theology in preparation for priestly ordination. On June 26, 1913, he was ordained at Mount St. Alphonsus by Thomas Francis Cusack, auxiliary bishop of the Archdiocese of New York. From August 14, 1913, to February 15, 1914, he did a second novitiate in Annapolis and was assigned as a curate to Our Lady of Perpetual Help church in Brooklyn, NY. He remained there in pastoral ministry until September 15, 1915.

== Career ==
In 1915, Connell's superiors already planned to send him to Rome to earn a doctorate. World War I made this difficult. Instead, Connell was assigned to teach dogmatic theology at Mount St. Alphonsus Seminary.

In 1921, he was sent to the Pontificium Collegium Internationale Angelicum, the future Pontifical University of Saint Thomas Aquinas, Angelicum in Rome. With his dissertation De scientia beata Christi he obtained a Doctorate in Sacred Theology summa cum laude. On returning to the United States, was assigned for a short time to his previous parish in Brooklyn.

From 1924 to 1940 he taught dogma again at the Redemptorist seminary in Esopus.

In 1940, Bishop Joseph Moran Corrigan, Rector of the Catholic University of America in Washington, D.C., invited Connell to teach dogma there and Connell accepted. During the summer of 1940, Fr. James W. O'Brien, then professor of moral theology, was reassigned by his own bishop to a become rector of the archdiocesan seminary in Cincinnati and Connell was asked to fill O'Brien's teaching post, which he did from autumn of 1940 until his retirement in 1958.

From 1945 until 1950, he also served as rector of Holy Redeemer College, in Washington, D.C. During the 1940s, he was a charter member and first president of the Catholic Theological Society of America.

By 1949 Connell had risen to Dean of the School of Sacred Theology at Catholic University and remained until 1957.

=== Last decade, 1958-67 ===
After retiring from the archdiocesan seminary in Cincinnati, he still stayed on as Dean of Religious Communities at the Catholic University from 1958 to 1967, and from 1958 to 1962 he was also professor of Sacred Sciences at St. John's University in New York.

Connell was named a peritus for the Second Vatican Council. He was on the American Bishops' Press Panel which briefed English-speaking reporters of conciliar proceedings.

=== Influence ===
Connell was sought for advice by bishops, priests, religious, and laity. During his time in Washington, he used to send out between two and three thousands responses by mail each year. Connell claimed that through his teaching, letters, retreats, and conferences, he had come into contact with one-quarter of the priests in the United States.

Connell's influence also spread through the media. He appeared frequently on the radio and television, such as the national "Catholic Hour," "Church of the Air," and "Washington Catholic Hour." He wrote numerous articles for the reviews Angelicum, American Ecclesiastical Review regularly from 1943 to 1967, Clergy Review, Thought, Homiletic and Pastoral Review, and Atlantic Monthly, as well as a number of books. He was preparing a two volume text on moral theology when he died.

== Personal life ==
Connell regularly spent his summers at the San Alfonso Redemptorist retreat house in Long Branch, New Jersey. He enjoyed going into the ocean daily.

== Quotes of theological views ==
By his own admission, the chief theological influences on him were dogmatic theologians Reginald Garrigou-Lagrange, O.P., and Fr. Gerardus Cornelis Van Noort (d. 1946); and moral theologians St. Alphonsus Liguori, B. Merkelbach, O.P., and Regatillo-Zalba, S.J. whose manuals he used in his teaching. "One who knows dogmatic theology well is really best qualified to teach moral theology. After all, theology is one science."

"The moral theologian must give guidance to people; he must explain to them how they must conduct themselves. Of course, the theologian is not a member of the Church's teaching authority – the Magisterium: he is not an official teacher of the Church. And yet, …, theologians and Scripture scholars are supposed to guide those who do officially teach in the Church. The Magisterium learns from theology."

"The sensus fidelium is synonymous with the ecclesia discens-the learning Church. Recently there have been some who believe that the ecclesia docens-the teaching Church-must follow the ecclesia discens. This is wrong. It has always been that the Church gives doctrine and the faithful learn doctrine."

"For the Church does not give her sacraments to those who call themselves Catholics, but knowingly reject any of her authoritative teachings. (Whether such persons can be truly called Catholics is a complicated question. But in any event, they have excluded themselves from the lawful reception of the sacraments."

"I would like to point out that I have not always been labeled a conservative. Twenty-five years ago (1942), I was regarded as a liberal theologian! I regret very much this dichotomy-liberal or conservative-has been used at all. To my mind you can and should be both' liberal and conservative. The theologian must realize that there are developments in theology and that new problems have to be faced and answered. But on the other hand, he must also realize that his solutions must not oppose what the Church has taught for centuries. …. This distinction between liberal and conservative is largely due to the press at the Vatican Council."

"Some theologians have changed, yes. But, I cannot see how theology has changed. I do not see how it could be changed radically, since it takes its principles from Revelation as taught by the Church. There has surely been a significant progress in theology over the last decade, but this does not mean that there has been a denial of what went before."

"Prayer and theology go hand in hand. I recommend to every Catholic theologian, whether he be lay or clerical, a deep devotion to the Blessed Sacrament. Believing that Christ is truly, really, and substantially present in the Eucharist, we can derive great help from Him. We should also have a devotion to Mary, the Seat of Wisdom. Through her, we may hope to receive true wisdom from her Divine Son."

== Publications ==
=== Dogmatic works ===
- "Again the Doctrine of Hell," Homiletic and Pastoral Review 35 (1935): 368–383.
- "Is the Fire of Hell Eternal and Real," Homiletic and Pastoral Review 34 (1934): 1250–1260.
- The New Confraternity Edition Revised Baltimore Catechism and Mass, No. 3, (NY: Benziger, 1952).
- The Seven Sacraments, (Glen Rock, NJ: Paulist Press, 1939).

=== Moral works ===
- "Birth Control: The Case for the Catholic," The Atlantic (October 1939)
- "The Catholic Doctrine on the Ends of Marriage," Catholic Theological Society of America Proceedings 1 (1946):34-45.
- "The Mixed-Marriage Promises," In Background to Morality ed. John P. Lerhinam, C.SS.R (New York: Desclee Co., 1964), 187–216
- "Moral Theology in the AER, 1889-1963," American Ecclesiastical Review 150 (1964): 44–53.
- "Recent Moral Theology," American Ecclesiastical Review 111 (1944): 104–113.
- Morals in Politics and Professions: A Guide for Catholics in Public Life (Westminster, MD: Newman Bookshop, 1946)
- Outlines of Moral Theology, (Milwaukee: Bruce, 1953).
- "The Relationship Between Church and State," The Jurist 13.4 (Oct. 1953).
- "Answers to Questions," (monthly) in American ecclesiastical Review v. 110 (Jan 1944) to v. 156 (June 1967)'
- "The Question Box" in Catholic Nurse v. 1 (March 1954) to v. 15 (March 1957).
- "Problems of Professional People" in Liguorian v. 42 (1954) to v. 55 (1967).

=== Other works ===
- "Going, Therefore Teach," In Why I Became a Priest, edited by G.L. Kane (Westminster, Maryland: Newman Books, 1952), 57–64.
- "The Theological School in America," In Essays on Catholic Education in the United States, Roy J. Deferrari, ed. (Washington, DC: CUA, 1942):219-233.
- Sermon Outlines Based on Catholic Faith in Action for the Sundays of the Ecclesiastical Year 1953, (Washington, DC, 1952).
- Spiritual and Pastoral Conferences for Priests
- Sunday Sermon Outlines, (NY: Frederick Putset, 1955).
