= George Connell =

George Connell may refer to:

- George Connell (biochemist) (1930–2015), Canadian academic
- George Connell (mayor) (1871–1955), U.S. Republican politician
- George Heber Connell (1836–1881), merchant and political figure in New Brunswick, Canada
