= André Rives =

France international rugby league footballer

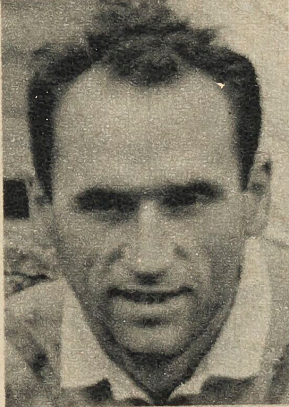

Personal information
- Born: 6 January 1924 Saint-Girons, Ariège, Occitania, France
- Died: 11 March 2017 (aged 93) Seix, France

Playing information
- Position: Fullback
Club
Years	Team	Pld	T	G	FG	P
	Albi XIII
	Saint-Gaudens
	Total	0	0	0	0	0
Representative
Years	Team	Pld	T	G	FG	P
1957–59	France	14	3	0	0	9

Coaching information
Representative
Years	Team	Gms	W	D	L	W%
1959–??	Saint-Gaudens

André Rives (6 January 1924 – 11 March 2017) was a French rugby league footballer who played as a fullback.

== Career ==
He debuted in rugby union playing for Saint-Girons Sporting Club, his hometown club, participating at the notable victory against Stade Français in 1945. In 1947, he switched codes to rugby league, joining Albi. A fullback, he rivalised with Puig Aubert, known as "Pipette". With Albi, Rives was two times French Champion against Carcassonne, which would make him join the France national team for the 1957 Rugby League World Cup. He had 14 international caps. During his career, Rives played two clubs, initially for Albi and later, for Saint-Gaudens, which he would join in the early 1960s. With the former, he won two French champion titles, with the latter, he won a French championship final. His club performances brought him into the France national team between 1957 and 1959, notably taking part at the 1957 Rugby League World Cup and succeeding his position to Puig Aubert.

It was considered that although he was of "short stature", he was of a "rare talent" and was considered as "Pipette's rightful successor"
