= Brian Davies (rugby league) =

Australia international rugby league footballer

Personal information
- Born: 16 May 1930 Brisbane, Queensland, Australia
- Died: 14 November 2012 (aged 82) Mitchelton, Queensland

Playing information
- Position: Second-row
Club
Years	Team	Pld	T	G	FG	P
1948–58	Brothers (Brisbane)
1959–62	Canterbury-Bankstown	59	7	89	0	199
1963	St. George (Qld.)
1964	Brothers (Brisbane)
	Total	59	7	89	0	199
Representative
Years	Team	Pld	T	G	FG	P
1950–58	Queensland	31	8	14	0	52
1951–58	Australia	33	5	7	0	29

Brian Davies (16 May 1930 – 14 November 2012) was a Queensland state and Australian national representative rugby league footballer who played in the 1940s, 1950s and 1960s. He played in 27 Tests between 1951 and 1958 as captain on 3 occasions. He played at both Prop forward and as a Second rower and was a noted goal-kicker. His club career was played in both the Brisbane and Sydney domestic competitions. He is considered one of the nation's finest footballers of the 20th century.

== Club career ==
Davies was born in Brisbane, Queensland, and did not begin playing rugby league until he was eighteen. He was recruited purely on the basis of his size by Brisbane Brothers identity Bert Fraser to trial with Brothers in 1948. He became a regular first grader in 1950. He won a Brisbane premiership with Brothers in 1956 and captained the side to a second premiership in 1958.

In 1959 he moved to Sydney and signed on as captain with Canterbury-Bankstown where he played four seasons. He returned to Queensland in 1963 as captain-coach of the St. George district side and his final playing year in 1964 as captain-coach was back with the Brisbane Brothers club where his career had started.

== Representative career ==
Before Davies begun playing rugby league, he played for Queensland's first ever representative water polo team. He played for Queensland at the 1948 Australian Championships, which was held at North Sydney Pool.

Davies made his state representative debut for Queensland in the same year he debuted in club first grade and in that year 1950, also played for Queensland against a touring Great Britain side.

He made his Test debut against France in 1951 and played in all three Tests of that series at home. He was selected on the 1952 Kangaroo tour and played in all six Tests and eighteen minor tour matches. In 1953 he also made a three Test tour against New Zealand. He made further Test appearances in the 1954 Ashes series, the 1954 World Cup, in Australia's 1955 series loss to France and in 1956 Tests against New Zealand. He made a second Kangaroo Tour in 1956 appearing in three Tests and nine tour matches and also played in the 1957 World Cup. He is listed on the Australian Players Register as Kangaroo No.282.

His first appearance as captain of the Kangaroos was in the 1958 jubilee year of rugby league in the Ashes series against the visiting British Lions. Davies was captain-coach of Australia in all three matches of the series which was lost 2 Tests to one. The Second Test in Brisbane is remembered for the heroic performance of Lion's captain Alan Prescott who played 76 minutes of the match with a broken-arm, refusing to come off with his side already down to twelve men having lost five-eighth Dave Bolton with a broken collar-bone. Against all odds the British side won 25–18.

In 1980 in the inaugural Rugby League State of Origin series along with fellow Queensland legend Duncan Hall, Davies was invited to be manager of the Queensland Maroons.

== Accolades ==
In February 2008, Davies was named in the list of Australia's 100 Greatest Players (1908–2007) which was commissioned by the NRL and ARL to celebrate the code's centenary year in Australia. In June 2008, he was chosen in the Queensland Rugby League's Team of the Century at second-row.

In 2009 Davies was inducted into the Queensland Sport Hall of Fame.

== Representative matches played ==
Team	Matches	Years
Queensland	38	1950–1958
Australia (Tests)	27	1951–1958
Australia (World Cup)	6	1954 & 1957

== Sources ==
- Whiticker, Alan (2004) Captaining the Kangaroos, New Holland, Sydney
- Andrews, Malcolm (2006) The ABC of Rugby League Austn Broadcasting Corpn, Sydney
- Queensland Team of the Century named – article at nz.leagueunlimited.com

Preceded by Dick Poole	Australian national rugby league captain 1958	Succeeded by Brian Carlson
