= Ian Moir =

Australia international rugby league footballer

- Moir in action 1953

Personal information
- Full name: Ian James Moir
- Born: 6 July 1931 Wollongong, New South Wales, Australia
- Died: 19 September 1990 (aged 59) Nelson Bay, New South Wales, Australia

Playing information
- Position: Wing
Club
Years	Team	Pld	T	G	FG	P
1952–58	South Sydney	110	105	0	0	315
1959–60	Western Suburbs	28	14	0	0	42
	Total	138	119	0	0	357
Representative
Years	Team	Pld	T	G	FG	P
1952–59	New South Wales	11	14	0	0	42
1954–59	Australia	8	6	0	0	18
1953–59	NSW City	4	7	0	0	21

Ian James Moir (1931–1990) was an Australian professional rugby league footballer, a champion wing three-quarter who played in the 1950s and 1960s for South Sydney and Western Suburbs. He made eight Test appearances for the Australian national representative side and represented in four World Cup matches in two World Cups and in 14 Kangaroo tour matches.

== Rugby league career ==
Moir was a prodigious try scorer and played in South Sydney's three Premiership victories between 1953 and 1955. In 1953 he scored three tries in the 31–12 grand final against St George, capping off a season where he was Souths leading try scorer with a tally of 23. This total stands in 3rd place in the club's all-time list of most tries in a season.

He debuted for Australia in the inaugural World Cup in France in 1954. He is listed on the Australian Players Register as Kangaroo No. 313. Moir also played Tests against all the rugby league playing nations and toured Great Britain with the 1956 Kangaroos where he played in two Tests and 14 tour matches and topped the tour try scoring list with 13 tries. He also featured in Australia's victorious 1957 World Cup campaign played at home. Said to have been the fastest winger in the Sydney competition, he is one of six Rabbitohs players to score five tries in a match, doing so in Round 7 of 1957 against Parramatta at Redfern Oval. His 105 career tries for the Rabbitohs in 110 games stands in fourth place behind Alex Johnston's 147 in the all-time club record list.

In 2004 he was named by Souths in their South Sydney Dream Team, consisting of 17 players and a coach representing the club from 1908 through to 2004.

== Sources ==
- Andrews, Malcolm (2006) The ABC of Rugby League, Austn Broadcasting Corpn, Sydney
- NRL Official 2007 Season Guide, News Magazines Surry Hills Sydney, for the National Rugby League
