= Cyril Connell Sr. =

Australian rugby league footballer

Cyril Connell
Personal information
- Full name: Cyril John Connell
- Born: 6 June 1899; Sydney, New South Wales, Australia
- Died: 24 October 1974 (aged 75); Brisbane, Queensland, Australia

Playing information
- Position: Halfback
Club
Years	Team	Pld	T	G	FG	P
	Fortitude Valley
	Easts (Brisbane)
	Total	0	0	0	0	0
Representative
Years	Team	Pld	T	G	FG	P
1920–25	Queensland	7
- Relatives: Cyril Connell Jr. (son)

Cyril John Connell CBE (6 June 1899 – 25 October 1974) was an Australian university registrar and rugby league footballer and administrator. His son Cyril Connell Jr. also went on to become a successful rugby league footballer in his era.

Connell was born in Sydney, New South Wales and in his youth he fought in World War I, serving with the Australian Imperial Force in France. In 1922 he was halfback of the first Queensland team to defeat New South Wales.

After retiring from the football field Connell also served as an administrator for the Queensland Rugby League.

Connell's time as registrar of the University of Queensland is thought to have contributed significantly to the university's growth in the 1950s and 1960s. This earned him the honour of commander (civil) of the Order of the British Empire in 1965.

In 2000 Connell was awarded the Australian Sports Medal for his contribution to Australia's international standing in rugby league.
