= Archdeacon of Ossory =

Province of Dublin
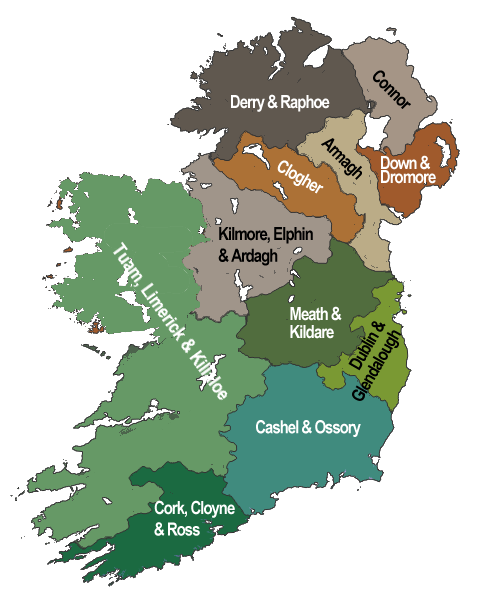
- Church: Church of Ireland
- Metropolitan bishop: Archbishop of Dublin
- Cathedral: Christ Church Cathedral, Dublin
- Dioceses: 5

The Archdeacon of Ossory was a senior ecclesiastical officer within the Diocese of Ossory until 1835 and then within the Bishop of Ossory, Ferns and Leighlin until 1977 when it was further enlarged to become the Diocese of Cashel and Ossory. As such he was responsible for the disciplinary supervision of the clergy within the Cloyne Diocese.

The archdeaconry can trace its history from Gilbert, the first known incumbent, who held the office from 1200 to 1206 to the last discrete holder Waller de Montmorency who died in 1924.

It was replaced by the combined archdeaconry of Ossory and Leighlin.
