= Kangaroo Tour =

Australian rugby league tour

Kangaroo Tour is the name given to Australia national rugby league team tours of Great Britain and France, tours to New Zealand and the one-off tour to Papua New Guinea (1991). The first Kangaroo Tour was in 1908. Traditionally, Kangaroo Tours took place every four years and involved a three-Test Ashes series against Great Britain (sometimes called Northern Union or The Lions) and a number of tour matches. The 1911/12 and 1921/22 tours were by the Australasian Kangaroos as both teams included New Zealand players. Some Kangaroo tours to Great Britain and France also included international friendly matches against Wales, though these games were not given test match status.

The last full Kangaroo Tour was in 1994, although shortened Kangaroo Tours took place in 2001 and again in 2003.

Since 1954, the Kangaroos have also made a number of overseas tours for multi-team tournaments such as the World Cup, Tri-Nations and Four Nations, however these are not classed as Kangaroo tours.

== Kangaroo tour of Great Britain and France ==
=== 1908/09 Kangaroo Tour ===
==== Northern Union vs. Australia ====
- Northern Union 22–22 Australia
- Northern Union 15–5 Australia
- Northern Union 6–5 Australia

Played: 45
Won: 17 Drew: 6 Lost: 22
Ashes: Great Britain 2–0

=== 1911/12 Kangaroo Tour ===
==== Northern Union vs. Australasia ====
- First Test Northern Union 10–19 Australasia
- Second Test Northern Union 11–11 Australasia
- Third Test Northern Union 8–33 Australasia

Played: 35
Won: 28 Drew: 2 Lost: 5
Ashes: Australasia 2–0

=== 1921/22 Kangaroo Tour ===
==== Great Britain vs. Australasia ====
- First Test Great Britain 6–5 Australasia
- Second Test Great Britain 2–16 Australasia
- Third Test Great Britain 6–0 Australasia

Played: 36
Won: 27 Drew: 0 Lost: 9
Ashes: Great Britain 2–1

=== 1929/30 Kangaroo Tour ===
==== The Lions vs. Australia ====
- First Test The Lions 8–31 Australia
- Second Test The Lions 9–3 Australia
- Third Test The Lions 0–0 Australia
- Fourth Test The Lions 3–0 Australia

Played: 35
Won: 24 Drew: 2 Lost: 7
Ashes: Great Britain 2–1

=== 1933/34 Kangaroo Tour ===
==== The Lions vs. Australia ====
- First Test The Lions 4–0 Australia
- Second Test The Lions 7–5 Australia
- Third Test The Lions 19–16 Australia

Played: 37
Won: 27 Drew: 0 Lost: 10
Ashes: Great Britain 3–0

=== 1937/38 Kangaroo Tour ===
==== The Lions vs. Australia ====
- First Test The Lions 5–4 Australia
- Second Test The Lions 13–3 Australia
- Third Test The Lions 3–13 Australia

==== France vs. Australia ====
- First Test: France 6–35 Australia
- Second Test: France 11–16 Australia

Played: 35
Won: 22 Drew: 1 Lost: 12
Ashes: Great Britain 2–1

=== 1948/49 Kangaroo Tour ===
==== Great Britain vs. Australia ====
- First Test Great Britain 23–21 Australia
- Second Test Great Britain 16–7 Australia
- Third Test Great Britain 23–9 Australia

==== France vs. Australia ====
- First Test: France 10–29 Australia
- Second Test: France 0–10 Australia

Played: 37
Won: 24 Drew: 0 Lost: 13
Ashes: Great Britain 3–0

=== 1952/53 Kangaroo Tour ===
==== Great Britain vs. Australia ====
- First Test Great Britain 16–9 Australia
- Second Test Great Britain 21–5 Australia
- Third Test Great Britain 7–27 Australia

==== France vs. Australia ====
- First Test: France 12–16 Australia
- Second Test: France 5–0 Australia
- Third Test: France 13–5 Australia

Played: 40
Won: 33 Drew: 1 Lost: 6
Ashes: Great Britain 2–1

=== 1956/57 Kangaroo Tour ===
A record eleven Queenslanders were selected for this tour.

==== Great Britain vs. Australia ====
- First Test Great Britain 21–10 Australia
- Second Test Great Britain 9–22 Australia
- Third Test Great Britain 19–0 Australia

==== France vs. Australia ====
- First Test: France 8–15 Australia
- Second Test: France 6–10 Australia
- Third Test: France 21–25 Australia

Played: 28
Won: 18 Drew: 1 Lost: 9
Ashes: Great Britain 2–1

=== 1959/60 Kangaroo Tour ===
==== Great Britain vs. Australia ====
- First Test Great Britain 14–22 Australia
- Second Test Great Britain 11–10 Australia
- Third Test Great Britain 18–12 Australia

==== France vs. Australia ====
- First Test: France 19–20 Australia
- Second Test: France 2–17 Australia
- Third Test: France 8–16 Australia

Played: 24
Won: 15 Drew: 0 Lost: 9
Ashes: Great Britain 2–1

=== 1963/64 Kangaroo Tour ===
==== Great Britain vs. Australia ====
- First Test Great Britain 2–28 Australia
- Second Test Great Britain 12–50 Australia
- Third Test Great Britain 16–5 Australia

The 1963 Kangaroos thus became the first Australian only side to win the Ashes on British soil.

==== France vs. Australia ====
- First Test: France 8–5 Australia
- Second Test: France 9–21 Australia
- Third Test: France 8–16 Australia

Played: 36
Won: 28 Drew: 1 Lost: 7
Ashes: Australia 2–1

=== 1967/68 Kangaroo Tour ===
==== Great Britain vs. Australia ====
- First Test Great Britain 16–11 Australia
- Second Test Great Britain 11–17 Australia
- Third Test Great Britain 3–11 Australia

==== France vs. Australia ====
- First Test: France 7–7 Australia
- Second Test: France 10–3 Australia
- Third Test: France 16–13 Australia

Played: 27
Won: 16 Drew: 2 Lost: 9
Ashes: Australia 2–1

=== 1973 Kangaroo Tour ===
==== Great Britain vs. Australia ====
- First Test Great Britain 21–12 Australia
- Second Test Great Britain 6–14 Australia
- Third Test Great Britain 5–15 Australia

==== France vs. Australia ====
- First Test: France 11–21 Australia
- Second Test: France 3–14 Australia

Played: 19
Won: 17 Drew: 0 Lost: 2
Ashes: Australia 2–1

=== 1978 Kangaroo Tour ===
==== Great Britain vs. Australia ====
- First Test Great Britain 9–15 Australia
- Second Test Great Britain 18–14 Australia
- Third Test Great Britain 6–23 Australia

==== France vs. Australia ====
- First Test: France 13–10 Australia
- Second Test: France 11–10 Australia

Played: 22
Won: 16 Drew: 0 Lost: 6
Ashes: Australia 2–1

=== 1982 Kangaroo Tour ===
==== Great Britain vs. Australia ====
- First Test Great Britain 4–40 Australia
- Second Test Great Britain 6–27 Australia
- Third Test Great Britain 8–32 Australia

==== France vs. Australia ====
- First Test: France 4–15 Australia
- Second Test: France 9–23 Australia

Played: 22
Won: 22 Drew: 0 Lost: 0
Ashes: Australia 3–0

The 1982 Kangaroos became the first team to go through Great Britain and France undefeated earning them the nickname The Invincibles.

=== 1986 Kangaroo Tour ===
==== Great Britain vs. Australia ====
- First Test Great Britain 16–38 Australia
- Second Test Great Britain 4–34 Australia
- Third Test Great Britain 15–24 Australia

==== France vs. Australia ====
- First Test: France 2–44 Australia
- Second Test: France 0–52 Australia

Played: 20
Won: 20 Drew: 0 Lost: 0
Ashes: Australia 3–0

Emulating the 1982 Kangaroo tour, the 1986 Kangaroos went through Great Britain and France undefeated earning them the nickname The Unbeatables.

=== 1990 Kangaroo Tour ===
==== Great Britain vs. Australia ====
- First Test Great Britain 19–12 Australia
- Second Test Great Britain 10–14 Australia
- Third Test Great Britain 0–14 Australia

==== France vs. Australia ====
- First Test: France 4–60 Australia
- Second Test: France 10–34 Australia

Played: 18
Won: 17 Drew: 0 Lost: 1
Ashes: Australia 2–1

=== 1994 Kangaroo Tour ===
==== Great Britain vs. Australia ====
- First Test: Great Britain 8–4 Australia
- Second Test: Great Britain 8–38 Australia
- Third Test: Great Britain 4–23 Australia

==== France vs. Australia ====
- One-off Test: France 0–74 Australia

Played: 18
Won: 17 Drew: 0 Lost: 1
Ashes: Australia 2–1

=== 2001 Kangaroo Tour ===
==== Great Britain vs. Australia ====
- First Test Great Britain 20–12 Australia
- Second Test Great Britain 12–40 Australia
- Third Test Great Britain 8–28 Australia

Played: 3
Won: 2 Drew: 0 Lost: 1
Ashes: Australia 2–1

=== 2003 Kangaroo Tour ===
==== Great Britain vs. Australia ====
- First Test Great Britain 18–22 Australia
- Second Test Great Britain 20–23 Australia
- Third Test Great Britain 12–18 Australia

Played: 6
Won: 6 Drew: 0 Lost: 0
Ashes: Australia 3–0

=== 2025 Kangaroo Tour ===
==== England vs. Australia ====
- First Test England 6–26 Australia
- Second Test England 4–14 Australia
- Third Test England 8–30 Australia

Played: 3
Won: 3 Drew: 0 Lost: 0
Ashes: Australia 3–0

== Kangaroo tour of New Zealand ==
=== 1919 ===
==== New Zealand vs. Australia ====
- First Test New Zealand 21–44 Australia
- Second Test New Zealand 26–10 Australia
- Third Test New Zealand 23–34 Australia
- Fourth Test New Zealand 2–32 Australia

Played: 9
Won: 8 Drew: 0 Lost: 1
Trans-Tasman series: Australia 3–1

=== 1935 ===
==== New Zealand vs. Australia ====
- First Test New Zealand 22–14 Australia
- Second Test New Zealand 8–29 Australia
- Third Test New Zealand 8–31 Australia

Played: 6
Won: 5 Drew: 0 Lost: 1
Trans-Tasman series: Australia 2–1

=== 1949 ===
==== New Zealand vs. Australia ====
- First Test New Zealand 26–21 Australia
- Second Test New Zealand 10–13 Australia

Played: 10
Won: 9 Drew: 0 Lost: 1
Trans-Tasman series: Draw 1–1

=== 1953 ===
==== New Zealand vs. Australia ====
- First Test New Zealand 25–5 Australia
- Second Test New Zealand 12–11 Australia
- Third Test New Zealand 16–18 Australia

Played: 9
Won: 7 Drew: 0 Lost: 2
Trans-Tasman series: New Zealand 2–1

=== 1961 ===
==== New Zealand vs. Australia ====
- First Test New Zealand 12–10 Australia
- Second Test New Zealand 8–10 Australia

Played: 9
Won: 7 Drew: 0 Lost: 2
Trans-Tasman series: Draw 1–1

=== 1965 ===
==== New Zealand vs. Australia ====
- First Test New Zealand 8–13 Australia
- Second Test New Zealand 7–5 Australia

Played: 8
Won: 7 Drew: 0 Lost: 1
Trans-Tasman series: Draw 1–1

=== 1969 ===
==== New Zealand vs. Australia ====
- First Test New Zealand 10–20 Australia
- Second Test New Zealand 18–14 Australia

Played: 6
Won: 4 Drew: 0 Lost: 2
Trans-Tasman series: Draw 1–1

=== 1971 ===
==== New Zealand vs. Australia ====
- First Test New Zealand 24–3 Australia

Played: 3
Won: 1 Drew: 0 Lost: 2
Trans-Tasman series: New Zealand 1–0

=== 1980 ===
==== New Zealand vs. Australia ====
- First Test New Zealand 6–27 Australia
- Second Test New Zealand 6–15 Australia

Played: 7
Won: 5 Drew: 1 Lost: 1
Trans-Tasman series: Australia 2–0

=== 1985 ===
==== New Zealand vs. Australia ====
- First Test Australia 26–20 New Zealand (Brisbane)
- Second Test New Zealand 6–10 Australia
- Third Test New Zealand 18–0 Australia

Played: 6
Won: 5 Drew: 0 Lost: 1
Trans-Tasman series: Australia 2–1

=== 1989 ===
==== New Zealand vs. Australia ====
- First Test New Zealand 6–26 Australia
- Second Test New Zealand 0–8 Australia
- Third Test New Zealand 14–22 Australia

Played: 6
Won: 5 Drew: 0 Lost: 1
Trans-Tasman series: Australia 3–0

== Kangaroo tour of Papua New Guinea ==
=== 1991 ===
==== Papua New Guinea vs. Australia ====
- First Test Papua New Guinea 2–58 Australia
- Second Test Papua New Guinea 6–40 Australia

Played: 5
Won: 5 Drew: 0 Lost: 0
Test series: Australia 2–0

== See also ==
- The Invincibles (rugby league)
- Rugby League Ashes
- Australia national rugby league team
- Great Britain national rugby league team
