= Queensland rugby league team =

Representative rugby league team for Queensland, Australia

Queensland Maroons

Team information
- Nicknames: Maroons; Cane toads (unofficial)
- Governing body: Queensland Rugby League
- Head coach: Darius Boyd
- Captain: Cameron Munster
- Most caps: Cameron Smith (42)
- Top try-scorer: Greg Inglis (18)
- Top point-scorer: Johnathan Thurston (220)
- Home stadium: Suncorp Stadium (52,500)

Uniforms
First colours

Team results
- First game
- Queensland 34–12 New Zealand (Brisbane Exhibition Ground, Brisbane; 16 May 1908)
- First State of Origin game
- Queensland 20–10 New South Wales (Lang Park, Brisbane; 8 July 1980)
- Biggest win
- Queensland 52–6 New South Wales (Suncorp Stadium, Brisbane; 8 July 2015)
- Biggest defeat
- New South Wales 69–5 Queensland (Sydney Cricket Ground, Sydney; 4 June 1957)

The Queensland rugby league team represents the Australian state of Queensland in rugby league football. Nicknamed the Maroons after the colour of their jersey, they play three times a year against arch-rivals New South Wales in the State of Origin series. The team was most recently coached by Billy Slater and captained by Cameron Munster, and is administered by the Queensland Rugby League. They play all of their home matches at Brisbane's Lang Park (known due to naming rights as Suncorp Stadium).

Since 1908, a rugby league team representing Queensland has been assembled from players based in the state to compete annually against New South Wales. The team used to play matches against other high-profile foreign and domestic touring teams, but has not played anyone other than New South Wales in several decades. From 1980 onwards, when Queensland was first allowed to select players of local origin even if they were currently at clubs outside its borders, the team's success rate against New South Wales improved dramatically. From 1980-87, clubs from both the Brisbane Rugby League and the NSWRL provided players for the side. Since the creation of the Brisbane Broncos in 1988, Maroons players have only been selected from the NSWRL (until 1995) and its successor competition, the National Rugby League, with the sole exception of Game III 2001 when Allan Langer was selected from the Super League. As of 2023, the Maroons have won thirteen out of the past eighteen series, including a record-breaking eight successive State of Origin victories between 2006 and 2013.

The Queensland Maroons enjoy widespread popularity across Queensland. Additionally, they are also the more popular side than the New South Wales Blues outside Queensland.

== History ==
=== Residential era (1908–1979) ===
Queensland had already been playing in their maroon jerseys each year against New South Wales in their sky blue before the split in rugby football between union and league took place. Queensland's captain, Mike Dore, left the rugby union establishment to play the new Northern Union brand of football in 1907 and his decision to switch codes influenced many other Queensland union players including his brother, to join the rugby league ranks. The first Queensland rugby league team ever formed, like the first New South Wales and Australian teams ever formed, was for playing the ground-breaking 1907–08 New Zealand rugby tourists, and was as follows:

1. Roy Allingham, 2. Doug McLean, 3. George Watson, 4. Arthur O'Brien, 5. William Evans, 6. William Abrahams, 7. Mick Dore
8. Jack Horan, 9. Robert Tubman, 10. William Hardcastle, 11. Vic Anderson, 12. Ernest Cartmill, 13. Jack Fihelly

Still some months away from having its own competition, when Queensland first played rugby league against New South Wales in the opening match of the 1908 interstate series they lost 43–0. This set the precedent for much of interstate rugby league's early history in Australia. During the 1912 New Zealand rugby league tour of Australia, Queensland lost both its matches against the Kiwis in Brisbane. Again, Queensland played two matches against the Kiwis during the 1913 New Zealand rugby league tour of Australia and again the Maroons lost both.

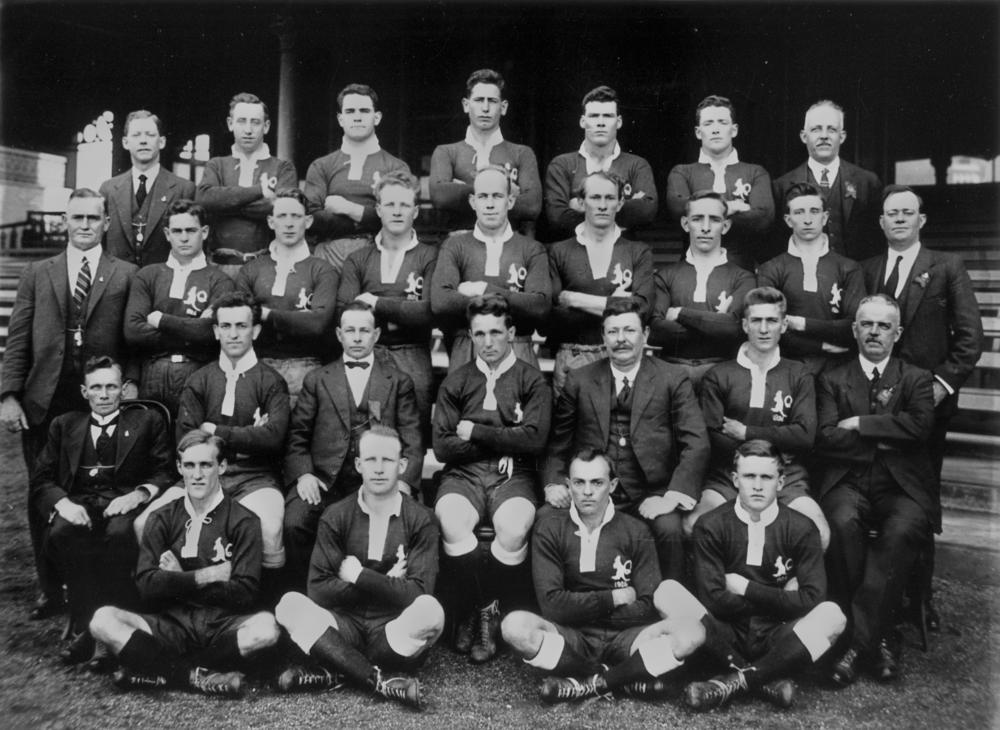
1924 Queensland side – captain Jim Craig

New South Wales had won every match between the two states until 1922, when the Maroons, with Cyril Connell playing at halfback, achieved their maiden victory. This commenced Queensland's only golden period before the introduction of State of Origin. During the 1924 Great Britain Lions tour Queensland hosted a match against Great Britain at the Brisbane Exhibition Ground, where 35,000 saw the Maroons defeat the Lions 10-25. In 1925 Queensland toured New Zealand and played against the full New Zealand side. The Queensland side was invited to tour ahead of the New South Wales side because Queensland was the more dominant of the two during this period.

During the 1951 French rugby league tour of Australia and New Zealand Queensland played one match against the successful France national rugby league team, a 19-all draw. During the 1953 American All Stars tour of Australia and New Zealand Queensland hosted a match at the Brisbane Cricket Ground, winning 39–39 before a crowd of 24,397.

As the twentieth century progressed, New South Wales proved to be the dominant team. Queensland did not win an interstate series against New South Wales until 1958. The powerful New South Wales Rugby Football League premiership attracted many Queenslanders south of the border, and the "residential" selection policy meant that the Maroons would often be disadvantaged against New South Wales teams containing many Queenslanders playing in the New South Wales club competition.

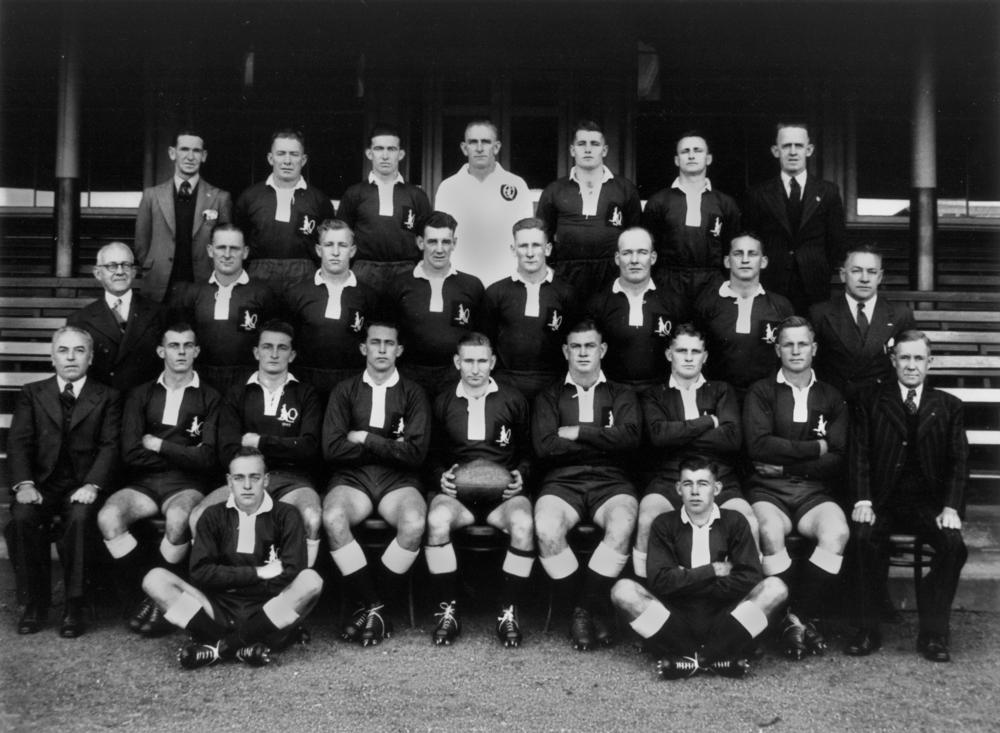
1949 Queensland side – captain Bill Tyquin

In the 1970s Queensland only won four matches, and it was decided that if New South Wales won the first two games of the 1980 series that there would be a "State of Origin" selection policy for the last game. This meant that selection would be based on the state a player made his senior debut in, not the state that he currently played in. Queensland's first truly representative team won the first State of Origin match 20–10 on 8 July 1980. After Queensland lost the first two games in 1981 the third match was again a State of Origin match. Queensland also won this game, and all subsequent series have been played under State of Origin selection criteria.

Queensland's overall record in interstate clashes between 1908 and 1981 (non-State of Origin matches) was 54 wins, 8 draws and 159 losses in 221 games. Between 1908 and 1979 Queensland also played matches against a number of touring Test teams.

Tour Matches
Opponent	Games played	Games won
Great Britain	16	5
France	4	3
South Africa	1	1

=== State of Origin era (1980–present) ===
In the inaugural State of Origin match in 1980, Queensland surprised all in a commanding 20–10 win over New South Wales. Arthur Beetson and Chris Close were the stars for Queensland, but Kerry Boustead scored Queensland's first ever try. This saw the new State of Origin rules applied a fairer game, saw it again in 1981. In 1981, legendary captain Arthur Beetson was ready to play before injury ruled him out, so he became coach of the team, and would remain so for the next three years. It seemed that State of Origin might still be dominated by New South Wales with the Blues ahead 15–0, but a remarkable comeback by Queensland saw them defeat New South Wales 22–15 with young captain Wally Lewis and Chris Close the stars of the comeback win. This match gave rugby league officials the impetus to decide that 1982 should have 2 State of Origin matches and a decider if required.

In 1982, for the first time all three matches of the interstate series were played using 'origin' selection rules. New South Wales won their first State of Origin match in Game One, but this was not enough to stop Queensland winning the second and third games with Mal Meninga, Rod Morris and captain Wally Lewis the heroes for Queensland of the series. The next year New South Wales won the second game, but Queensland dominated the first and the decider winning the series with Wally Lewis being the saviour for Queensland.

At the end of the 1983 seasons in Qld and NSW, the Queensland team also toured Papua New Guinea and England. Their tour of Great Britain saw them play three matches. The first against Hull Kingston Rovers resulted in an 8–6 loss, though the Wally Lewis led Maroons then easily won their remaining matches against Wigan (40–2) and Leeds (58–2).

In 1984, Queensland won the first two games for the series, dominating the series, with Kerry Boustead and Wally Lewis the stars of the series, New South Wales won the final match.

In 1985, Queensland saw their first ever series loss to New South Wales. New South Wales were dominant through the series. Queensland's poor performance could be seen as Arthur Beetson retiring as coach or New South Wales halfback Steve Mortimer in good form. Queensland lost the first two matches but won the third match. Under new coach, Wayne Bennett, the 1986 series saw Queensland play a lot better but the scoreboard did not show it. Queensland lost all 3 games, only by small margins for each game, but the fact was New South Wales had whitewashed Queensland.

In 1987, looking for redemption, Queensland lost the first game to New South Wales, but managed to win the last two games giving Wayne Bennett his first series win. Allan Langer's debut in the 1987 series saw Queensland win their first series since 1984, Langer went on to play 34 games for Queensland. In the exhibition match fourth game of 1987 in the US, Queensland could not manage to win. The Maroons also toured New Zealand in 1987.

In 1988, the introduction of Queensland-based clubs for the first grade competition Brisbane Broncos and Gold Coast, saw more wealth of talent for Queensland. In 1988 and 1989 it was Allan Langer and Wally Lewis's formidable halves partnership that had them dominate both series winning all 6 matches and not letting New South Wales win. Wayne Bennett won the 1988 series while returning coach Arthur Beetson won the 1989 series. As a result, in 1989 a record-breaking twelve Queenslanders were selected to tour with the Australian national team.

In 1990, the New South Wales team managed to win their first game since 1987, and going on to defeat the Queensland team 2–1 in the series, giving Queensland coach Arthur Beetson his first ever series loss with the team. In 1991, it was Queensland legend Wally Lewis, now known as the King, last series. With a new coach, Graham Lowe, Queensland won the first game, before New South Wales won the second. With Lewis's last game, the decider, the Queensland team managed to win the game by two points and give Lewis the perfect sendoff.

For the series 1992 to 1994 it seemed that Wally Lewis was sorely missed, losing a record three series in a row. With veteran Mal Meninga taking over as captain, Lowe continuing as coach, the Queensland team were unable to show any spark against New South Wales. They were able to win a game in each of the series in 1992, 1993, and 1994. The King Wally Lewis took over coaching for the Queensland team in 1993 and 1994, the QRL hoping he would revive some spark to the team.

In 1995, the Queensland team was noticeably hampered being unable to select players from the Super League teams, most notably the Brisbane Broncos. With new coach and former Queensland captain Paul Vautin, the Queensland team were apparently going to be belted by the New South Wales team. It was not to be. In one of the biggest upsets in Origin history, the baby Queensland team defied all betting odds and whitewashed the New South Wales team 3–0. In 1996, New South Wales got their revenge and whitewashed the Queensland team. In 1997, during the Super League War and the rival Super League Tri-series with another Queensland, New South Wales and New Zealand representative teams. Queensland were unable to win the series ending Vautin's reign as coach.

In 1998, Queensland re-employed Wayne Bennett as coach of the team who only wanted a one-year stint at the team. With the Super League War over, Queensland was able to pick a great side again. Allan Langer returned in style in a man of the match appearance guiding the Queensland team to a close 24–23 win in the first game. New South Wales won the second, but Queensland dominated the third and won. With new coach and former Queensland player Mark Murray at the helm the Queensland team won the first before losing the second. In controversial circumstances, Queensland were locked up at 6 all at half-time, scored with 8 minutes to go making it 10–6 seemingly wrapping up the game, but New South Wales scored and missed the conversion to finish the game 10-all, making it the first drawn game and series in State of Origin history. Queensland won the series by retaining the drawn shield. 2000 was a forgettable series, captain Gorden Tallis was sent from the field for dissent to referee Bill Harrigan in a 20–16 loss in Game One. Queensland lost Game Two 28–10 before suffering their worst ever State of Origin defeat 56–16 in Game Three to cap a 3–0 wipewish of the series.

In 2001, Wayne Bennett again took over after their humiliating 3–0 loss in 2000. Queensland won the first game decisively however injuries saw them lose the second game and those injuries were still there for Game Three. This saw coach Bennett take a huge risk, bringing out of retirement Allan Langer to make a miraculous comeback. Although some thought Langer couldn't rise to the challenge, the great halfback inspired Queensland to a win in the final game 40–14. In 2002, Langer again returned however Queensland were thumped in Game One 32–4. Queensland won Game Two 26–18 in spite of a horror debut by winger Justin Hodges who gifted New South Wales two tries via ingoal mistakes. The third game proved to be Langers final game, but a miraculous last minute try by back rower Dane Carlaw saw Queensland draw level with New South Wales 18-all. The game could have been won by Queensland if Lote Tuquri had converted the Carlaw try, but the conversion was wide thus resulting in the second drawn series in Origin history with Queensland retaining the shield.

The 2003 series, marked a period of New South Wales dominance at Origin. New South Wales won a hard-fought first game 25–12 before disposing of Queensland 27–4 in Game Two. The Queensland team took their anger out by flogging New South Wales in the dead rubber third game 36–6. Queensland however could not stop New South Wales taking the 2004 series 2–1 even with new coach Michael Hagan, when Brad Fittler came out of representative retirement for New South Wales to help them defeat Queensland. Game One was notable for being the first State of Origin game to go into Golden Point extra time, with Shaun Timmins kicking the winning field goal for New South Wales to win 9–8. Queensland won Game Two 22–18 on the back of an incredible try to winger Billy Slater the game in which Fitter returned. New South Wales wouldn't be denied in Game Three, winning 36–14 on the back of an inspirational performance by Fittler.

The 2005 series again was not much better for Queensland in spite of a Game One win in Golden Point extra time due to an intercept try to Matthew Bowen off a wayward Brett Kimmorley pass. Queensland however failed to dominate the series losing the final two matches to lose again to New South Wales after halfback Andrew Johns made a memorable return for the final two games. Queensland's 2005 series loss marked their third straight series defeat to New South Wales.

As part of the 25 year celebrations in 2005, Queensland named 25 legends for each year before that.

25th Anniversary Origin legends
Player	Position
Arthur Beetson	Second-row
Gary Belcher	Fullback
Martin Bella	Prop
Kerry Boustead	Wing
Chris Close	Centre
Greg Conescu	Hooker
Greg Dowling	Prop
Trevor Gillmeister	Second-row
Peter Jackson	Centre
Allan Langer	Halfback
Gary Larson	Second-row
Wally Lewis	Five-eighth
Bob Lindner	Second-row
Darren Lockyer	Fullback
Mal Meninga	Centre
Gene Miles	Centre
Rod Morris	Prop
Dale Shearer	Wing
Matt Sing	Wing
Darren Smith	Lock
Gorden Tallis	Second-row
Paul Vautin	Second-row
Kevin Walters	Five-eighth
Steve Walters	Hooker
Shane Webcke	Prop

In 2006, former Queensland great Mal Meninga took the helm of coach and he took a big risk in Game One to have 7 debutantes against a formidable New South Wales side. This showed in the opening 30 minutes where mistakes were made and New South Wales dominated on the scoreboard. A comeback in the second half wasn't enough to win, New South Wales getting home 17–16 on the back of a field goal in the final moments by halfback and last minute Blues replacement Brett Finch. This put coach Meninga and captain Darren Lockyer under intense criticism by New South Wales media. The second game however saw the fired up Queensland team defeat New South Wales easily 30–6. In the third and deciding game, Queensland found themselves down 14–4 with 9 minutes to go after some controversial refereeing decisions. However a miraculous comeback started by Johnathan Thurston and Brent Tate and an intercept try by Lockyer saw them steal the win and the series.

In 2007, Queensland were the bookies' favourites for the first time in a long time. Queensland were down 18–6 at half time but came back with 19 unanswered points to win the first game by a score of 25–18. Queensland went on to win the second game 10–6 and win the series. This was Queensland's first win in 12 attempts at Telstra Stadium.

In 2008, Queensland played without Darren Lockyer for the whole series and it showed in the first game in Sydney with Queensland losing 18–10. However, the return match in Brisbane saw Queensland return to form winning 30–0, equalling Queensland's biggest ever victory. The final game was again played at Telstra Stadium, with Queensland being down 10–8 at half time before coming back to win the game 16–10 leaving New South Wales pointless for the second half and on the wrong end of 3 successive series defeats.

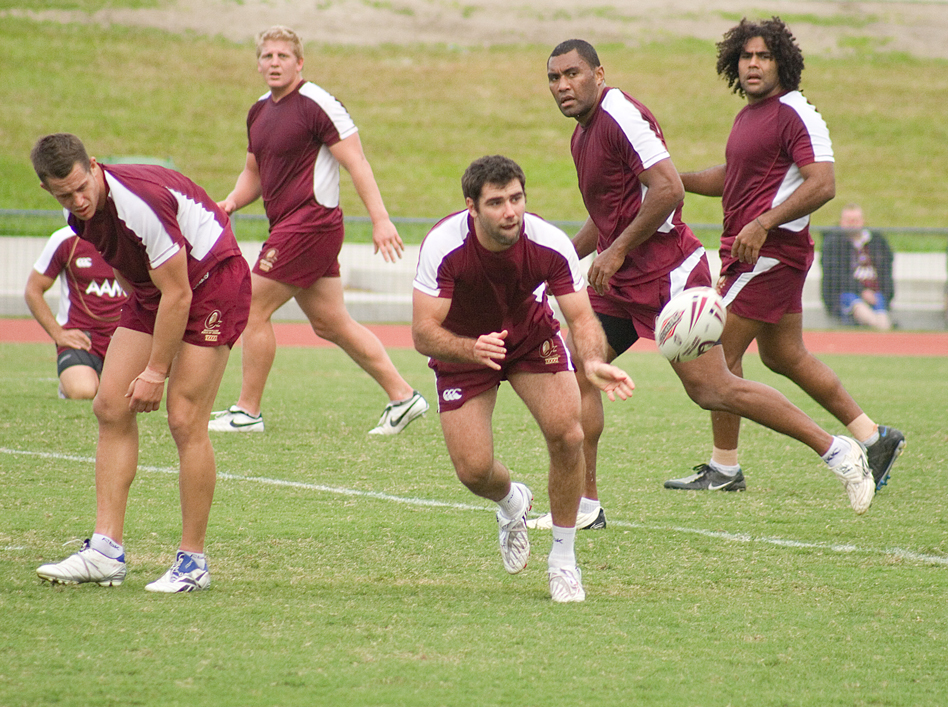
The Maroons training in 2009.

The mid-season test against the Kiwis in 2009 saw a record-equalling ten Queensland representatives, including an all maroon backline and front row.

In 2009, the Maroons became the first side to win four consecutive Origin series and were named sporting team of the year at the Queensland Sports Awards in December.In 2010, the Maroons had their 5th consecutive series win becoming the first team to ever do so, whilst also winning the games in a 3–0 clean sweep, the first time Queensland had accomplished this since 1995. Billy Slater was named Man of the Series.

In 2011, the Maroons had their 6th consecutive series win becoming the only team to ever do so. Also winning game III 34–24 and the series 2–1 in front of a record home crowd at Suncorp Stadium. This was also their captain Darren Lockyer's final State of Origin game. Cameron Smith was named both Man of the Match and Series.

In 2012, Queensland won game III 21–20 by a field goal in front of a mostly Maroon crowd at Suncorp stadium, making 7 series wins in a row. The final score was attributed partly to the retirement of Petero Civoniceva. Johnathon Thurston was named Man of the Match and Nate Myles was awarded Man of the Series.

In 2013, Queensland took the series again, for the 8th time in succession, after winning the 3rd game at ANZ Stadium in Sydney 12–10. Brent Tate was awarded Man of the Match.

In 2014, Queensland were defeated in an upset at their home stadium in game 1 of the series, and subsequently lost the 2nd game in Sydney, ending their 8-year winning streak.

In 2015, Queensland reclaimed the State of Origin series, with victories in Game I and Game III, at ANZ Stadium and Suncorp Stadium respectively. Game III of the series set a number of State of Origin records, including most goals in a game by a team (9 goals), biggest winning margin (46 points) and highest ever attendance at Suncorp (52,500), with Cameron Smith making his 36th appearance for Queensland in the same match, drawing level with Darren Lockyer for the record of most appearances for Queensland.

On 2 December 2015, Meninga resigned as Queensland head coach and was appointed head coach of the Australian national rugby league team, succeeding Tim Sheens. Meninga ended his 10-year reign as State of Origin's most successful coach.

On 28 December 2015, Kevin Walters was appointed head coach until the end of 2018. Walters, a 20-time Queensland representative and five-time premiership winner with the Brisbane Broncos, served as assistant coach to Meninga during four Origin series wins and coached the Queensland Under 20s side in 2012 and 2014.

In 2016, Cameron Smith broke Queensland's record for most appearances, and captained the Maroons to win Games I and II. Queensland's hopes of their first series whitewash since 2010 were dashed when they lost to NSW in Game III. Corey Parker retired following the match.

2017 would be Johnathan Thurston's last series playing for the Maroons. However, he was injured in a game for the North Queensland Cowboys and was unable to play Game I. Queensland suffered their largest defeat in over 10 years when they lost to NSW 28–4. Thurston returned for Game II and kicked the winning conversion to level the series. However, he was injured again and ruled out for Game III. In his farewell match, which he watched from the coach's box, Queensland defeated NSW 22–6 to win their third straight series and their eleventh from twelve.

Following the end of the 2017 series, coach Kevin Walters had his coaching contract extended for two years.

For the 2018 series, coach Kevin Walters selected Greg Inglis, at the time the top try-scorer in the State of Origin series, as the captain. Significant changes were made to the Queensland team for 2018 following the retirement of key players Cameron Smith, Johnathan Thurston and Cooper Cronk and the absence of Matthew Scott and Darius Boyd. Queensland then lost to NSW in both 2018 and 2019.

== Colours and badge ==
Former logo

The primary colour of the QLD Maroons is Maroon, which represents the state colour of Queensland. The secondary colour is Gold, with an additional contrasting colour of white. The Maroons badge was created and used since the club's founding in 1908. It features a football set centrally in a stylised Q representing Queensland. Other badges have been used such as a stylised Q with a Kangaroo next to it.

The Maroons jerseys used

1908–1981

1980–1990

2004–2006

=== Shirt sponsors and manufacturers ===
Period	Kit manufacturer	Major Sponsor	Minor Sponsor	Shorts Sponsor
1980, 1985–1986	Peerless	None	Stubbies	None
1987–1990	Peerless (jersey) Patrick (shorts)	None*	None	None
1991	Peerless	None	XXXX	XXXX
1992–1996	Canterbury (jersey) EMU (shorts)	None	XXXX	XXXX
1997–2002	Canterbury	None	XXXX	XXXX
2003–2014	Canterbury	AAMI	XXXX	XXXX
2015–2017	Canterbury	Suncorp	XXXX*	XXXX*
2018	ISC	Intrust Super	XXXX	XXXX
2019	ISC	Auswide Bank	XXXX	XXXX
2020	ISC	Auswide Bank	XXXX	Ice Break
2021–2023	Puma	Auswide Bank	XXXX	XXXX
2024–current	Puma	Westpac	XXXX	XXXX

- No manufacturer logo is present on the QLD jersey between 1981 and 1984.
- Alpha Micro Computers sponsored the QLD Origin team for the one-off exhibition game in Los Angeles in 1987.
- The XXXX 26 year Sponsorship of Queensland Maroons State of Origin Team will come to an end at the conclusion of State of Origin 3 at Suncorp Stadium on Wednesday, 12 July 2017.

== Players ==
While the Queensland rugby league team's players mostly come from Queensland, up until 1980 when residential selection criteria were still used, some of New South Wales' most prominent footballers, such as Dally Messenger and Clive Churchill, also played for the Maroons. Queensland's players are some of the most famous athletes Australia produces, with goal-kicking centre Mal Meninga being named the BBC Overseas Sports Personality of the Year in 1990, the first rugby league player to ever do so. Since the turn of the century Maroons players have become big name footballers not only in rugby league but in other codes as well. Rugby union's 2003 World Cup Final alone featured four former Queensland players: Brad Thorn playing for the All Blacks, and Mat Rogers, Lote Tuqiri and Wendell Sailor playing for the Wallabies. Former Maroons Karmichael Hunt and Israel Folau were both recruited by the AFL to play Australian rules football (and both also currently play professional rugby union).

=== Current squad ===
The Official Queensland Maroons Playing Squad 2025.

Pos.	Player	Series Winner	Caps	Pts	Club
Wing	Jesse Arthars	YET TO PLAY	0	0	Brisbane Broncos
Second-row	Kurt Capewell	YES	13	12	New Zealand Warriors
Lock	Patrick Carrigan	YES	12	0	Brisbane Broncos
Halfback	Daly Cherry-Evans	YES	26	18	Manly Sea Eagles
Wing	Xavier Coates	YES	12	24	Melbourne Storm
Prop	Lindsay Collins	YES	15	0	Sydney Roosters
Second-row	Reuben Cotter	YES	10	0	North Queensland Cowboys
Halfback	Tom Dearden	YES	7	0	North Queensland Cowboys
Prop	Tino Fa'asuamaleaui	YES	15	0	Gold Coast Titans
Second-row	Beau Fermor	YES	1	0	Gold Coast Titans
Second-row	Kulikefu Finefeuiaki	YET TO PLAY	0	0	Dolphins
Prop	Moeaki Fotuaika	YES	11	0	Gold Coast Titans
Hooker	Harry Grant	YES	14	8	Melbourne Storm
Wing	Valentine Holmes	YES	22	154	St George Illawarra Dragons
Lock	J'Maine Hopgood	NO	1	0	Parramatta Eels
Prop	Corey Horsburgh	YES	1	0	Canberra Raiders
Centre	Jack Howarth	YET TO PLAY	0	0	Melbourne Storm
Prop	Josh Kerr	YET TO PLAY	0	0	Dolphins
Lock	Trent Loiero	YES	3	0	Melbourne Storm
Five-eighth	Ezra Mam	YET TO PLAY	0	0	Brisbane Broncos
Lock	Kurt Mann	YES	2	0	Canterbury-Bankstown Bulldogs
Five-eighth	Cameron Munster (Captain)	YES	21	16	Melbourne Storm
Second-row	Jeremiah Nanai	YES	11	8	North Queensland Cowboys
Prop	Josh Papalii	YES	24	12	Canberra Raiders
Fullback	Kalyn Ponga	YES	10	12	Newcastle Knights
Centre	Gehamat Shibasaki	YES	1	0	Brisbane Broncos
Centre	Hamiso Tabuai-Fidow	YES	10	44	Dolphins
Centre	Robert Toia	YES	3	0	Sydney Roosters
Fullback	Reece Walsh	YES	5	0	Brisbane Broncos

=== Team of the Century (1908–2007) ===
In 2008, the centenary year of rugby league in Australia, the Queensland Rugby League named their best ever 17, selected from all players from 1908 to 2007.

Queensland
Team of the Century
1 Darren Lockyer – FB; 2 Cecil Aynsley – WG; 3 Tom Gorman – CE; 4 Mal Meninga – CE; 5 Denis Flannery – WG; 6 Wally Lewis (c) – FE; 7 Allan Langer – HB; 8 Mick Madsen – PR; 9 Noel Kelly – HK; 10 Duncan Hall – PR; 11 Brian Davies – SR; 12 Arthur Beetson – SR; 13 Bob Lindner – LK	Reserves: 14 Jim Craig; 15 Duncan Thompson; 16 Gene Miles; 17 Herb Steinohrt	Legend: (c) Captain(s); (vc) Vice-captain(s); Updated: 16 June 2008; Source(s):

=== All-Time Team (1980–2020) ===
Following Queensland's victory in the 2020 series as State of Origin celebrated its 40th anniversary, Origin legends including Wally Lewis, Paul Vautin, Darren Lockyer and Johnathan Thurston along with New South Wales' Peter Sterling and Andrew Johns selected Queensland's best 17 over the 40 years of State of Origin.

Queensland
All-Time Team (1980–2020)		Coaching staff
1 Billy Slater – FB; 2 Wendell Sailor – WG; 3 Mal Meninga – CE; 4 Greg Inglis – CE; 5 Lote Tuqiri – WG; 6 Wally Lewis – FE; 7 Johnathan Thurston – HB; 8 Shane Webcke – PR; 9 Cameron Smith – HK; 10 Arthur Beetson (c) – PR; 11 Trevor Gillmeister – SR; 12 Gorden Tallis – SR; 13 Bob Lindner – LK	Reserves: 14 Darren Lockyer – FB; 15 Petero Civoniceva – PR; 16 Paul Vautin – SR; 17 Allan Langer – HB	Player Coach: Mal Meninga; Legend: (c) Captain(s); (vc) Vice-captain(s); Updated: 24 November 2020; Source(s):

=== Captains ===
A list of captains for the Maroons since the beginning of the State of Origin era.

Player	Matches	Games as Captain	Wins	Losses	Draws	Series Wins	Winning %
Arthur Beetson	1	1980	1	0	0	1/1	100%
Wally Lewis	30	1981–1987, Games 2 & 3 1988, 1989, Games 2 & 3 1990, 1991	18	12	0	9/11*	60%
Paul Vautin	2	Game 1 1988, Game 1 1990	1	1	0	1/2*	50%
Mal Meninga	9	1992–1994	3	6	0	0/3	33.33%
Trevor Gillmeister	4	1995, Game 1 1996	3	1	0	1/2*	75%
Allan Langer	5	Games 2 & 3 1996, 1998	2	3	0	1/2*	40%
Adrian Lam	8	1997, Games 1 & 3 1999, 2000	2	5	1	1/3*^	25%
Kevin Walters	1	Game 2 1999	0	1	0	1/1*^	0%
Gorden Tallis	7	Game 1 2001, 2002, 2003	3	3	1	2/3*^	42.86%
Darren Lockyer	22	Game 2 & 3 2001, Games 2 & 3 2004, 2005–2007, 2009–2011	13	9	0	6/8*	59.09%
Shane Webcke	1	Game 1 2004	0	1	0	0/1*	0%
Cameron Smith	21	2008, 2012–2017	13	8	0	7/8	61.9%
Greg Inglis	2	Games 1 & 2 2018	0	2	0	0/1*	0%
Billy Slater	1	Game 3 2018	1	0	0	0/1*	100%
Daly Cherry-Evans	19	2019–Game 1 2025	9	10	0	4/7*	47.37%
Cameron Munster	5	Game 2 2025-present	3	2	0	1/2*	60%

Keys= * indicates more than 1 captain during a series, ^ indicates including a drawn series, retained shield

=== Emerging Origin squad ===
Each January, from 2001 to 2019, a squad of 14–15 players on the cusp of Queensland selection, took part in the Emerging Origin program held at the Queensland Academy of Sport in Brisbane. The program, run by Wayne Bennett and the current Queensland coaching staff, indoctrinated players on Queensland's Origin culture and values and included player training and meetings with dietitians and sports psychologists. From the inaugural Emerging Origin squad in 2001, 12 of the players went on to play for Queensland in State of Origin. Since 2001, 66 players who have participated in the Emerging Origin program have represented Queensland in State of Origin.

In 2000, after Queensland's embarrassing series defeat to New South Wales, Bennett returned to coach the Maroons and established the Emerging Origin program in conjunction with the QAS. Before re-taking the job, Bennett phoned then-Queensland Minister for Sport Terry Mackenroth, requesting that if he retake the job, the program receive the support of the government, which Mackenroth agreed to.

On 20 December 2019, the Queensland Rugby League announced a 33-man Maroons squad, which included current representatives and uncapped players, to take part in a two-day camp, moving away from the traditional Emerging Origin concept.

== Coaches ==
Queensland has had a total of eight different coaches at State of Origin level, all of whom have played for the Maroons previously except for New Zealand's Graham Lowe, the only non-Australian to coach in State of Origin. The list also includes the known coaches from the pre-Origin era and only counts games against NSW. Games against touring teams from New Zealand and Great Britain or Queensland's three game tour of England in 1983 are not counted. Win percentages are listed to the nearest two decimal places.

Coach	Years	Games	Wins	Win %	Series won
Herb Steinohrt	1946	-	-	-	-
Fred Gilbert	1951	-	-	-	-
Gordon Macrae	1952	-	-	-	-
Duncan Thompson	1953	-	-	-	-
Clive Churchill	1959	4	3	75%	-
Ted Verrenkamp	1960–1963	16	5	31.25%	-
Eric Harris	1964	2	0	0%	-
Ian Doyle	1965–1967	8	0	0%	-
Des Crow	1968–1970	5	0	0%	-
Bob Bax	1971–1972	5	0	0%	-
Wally O'Connell	1973	3	0	0%	-
Barry Muir	1974–1978	13	1	7.69%	-
John MacDonald	1979–1980	3	1	33.33%	-
Arthur Beetson	1981–1984; 1989–1990	19	11	57.89%	4
Des Morris	1985	3	1	33.33%	0
Wayne Bennett	1986–1988; 1998; 2001–2003; 2020	22	12	54.55%	5
Graham Lowe	1991–1992	6	3	50%	1
Wally Lewis	1993–1994	6	2	33.33%	0
Paul Vautin	1995–1997	9	4	44.44%	1
Mark Murray	1999–2000	6	1	16.67%	0
Michael Hagan	2004–2005	6	2	33.33%	0
Mal Meninga	2006–2015	30	20	66.67%	9
Kevin Walters	2016–2019	12	6	50%	2
Paul Green	2021	3	1	33.33%	0
Billy Slater	2022–2026	15	8	53.33%	3

== Wally Lewis / Ron McAuliffe Medal ==
From 1992 to 2003, this award was the "Wally Lewis Medal", however after 2003 this medal was dedicated to the player of the series from both Queensland and New South Wales, and thus the award for the Queensland Player of the Series was awarded with the Ron McAuliffe Medal.

Recipients
Year	Player	Position	Club team
1992	Allan Langer	Halfback	Brisbane Broncos
1993	Bob Lindner	Second-row, Lock	Illawarra Steelers
1994	Billy Moore	Lock, Second-row	North Sydney Bears
1995	Gary Larson	Second-row	North Sydney Bears
1996	Allan Langer (2)	Halfback	Brisbane Broncos
1997	Robbie O'Davis	Fullback	Newcastle Knights
1998	Allan Langer (3)	Halfback	Brisbane Broncos
1999	Jason Hetherington	Hooker	Canterbury-Bankstown Bulldogs
2000	Darren Smith	Centre	Canterbury-Bankstown Bulldogs
2001	Darren Lockyer	Fullback	Brisbane Broncos
2002	Shane Webcke	Prop	Brisbane Broncos
2003	Darren Lockyer (2)	Fullback	Brisbane Broncos
2004	Steve Price	Prop	Canterbury-Bankstown Bulldogs
2005	Cameron Smith	Hooker	Melbourne Storm
2006	Darren Lockyer (3)	Five-eighth	Brisbane Broncos
2007	Cameron Smith (2)	Hooker	Melbourne Storm
2008	Petero Civoniceva	Prop	Penrith Panthers
2009	Greg Inglis	Centre	Melbourne Storm
2010	Sam Thaiday	Second-row	Brisbane Broncos
2011	Petero Civoniceva (2)	Prop	Penrith Panthers
2012	Nate Myles	Second-row	Gold Coast Titans
2013	Cameron Smith (3)	Hooker	Melbourne Storm
2014	Nate Myles (2)	Prop	Gold Coast Titans
2015	Cameron Smith (4)	Hooker	Melbourne Storm
2016	Darius Boyd	Fullback	Brisbane Broncos
2017	Josh McGuire	Lock	Brisbane Broncos
2018	Billy Slater	Fullback	Melbourne Storm
2019	Ben Hunt	Hooker	St George Illawarra Dragons
2020	Jake Friend	Hooker	Sydney Roosters
2021	Ben Hunt (2)	Hooker	St George Illawarra Dragons
2022	Daly Cherry-Evans	Halfback	Manly Warringah Sea Eagles
2022	Patrick Carrigan	Lock	Brisbane Broncos
2023	Reuben Cotter	Prop	North Queensland Cowboys
2024	Tom Dearden	Five-eighth	North Queensland Cowboys
2025	Tom Dearden	Halfback	North Queensland Cowboys
2026	Selwyn Cobbo	Winger	Dolphins

== Records ==
The most-capped Queensland State of Origin player is Cameron Smith, with 42 caps. The player with the most tries for Queensland in State of Origin history is Greg Inglis, with 18 tries. The player with the most points is Johnathan Thurston, with 220 points.

== Support ==
The Queensland Maroons are widely supported within Queensland. The Maroons also garner significant support from rugby league fans outside the state in the State of Origin series against the New South Wales Blues (NSW Blues).

Ahead of Game III of the 2026 State of Origin series, data from the National Rugby League (NRL) found that the Maroons were the most popular team in the series. The data found that among NRL account holders, support for Queensland was at 65.0% in Tasmania, 61.8% in Victoria, 58.8% in the Northern Territory and 50.9% in Western Australia. Outside Australia, poll also found that 57.9% of fans based in Papua New Guinea (PNG) supported the Maroons, while New Zealand was almost evenly split at 50.5% (with the North Island narrowly supporting the NSW Blues and the South Island firmly supporting the Maroons). However, audiences in the United Kingdom and the United States were reported to favour the Blues. Following the data release, Blues hooker Reece Robson suggested that the Maroons' greater success (such as the period in which the team won eight consecutive Origin shields) drew neutral fans to the Maroons, citing some of his own friends as examples.

== See also ==
- Queensland Residents rugby league team
- Queensland under-20 rugby league team
- Queensland under-18 rugby league team
- Queensland under-16 rugby league team
- Queensland Women's rugby league team
