= 1948–49 Kangaroo tour of Great Britain and France =

Rugby league tour (1948–1949)

- Manager: Bill Buckley; Eric Simmonds
- Tour captain(s): Col Maxwell
- Top point scorer(s): John Graves 118
- Top try scorer(s): John Graves 16 & Jack Horrigan 16
- Top test point scorer(s): Keith Froome 15
- Top test try scorer(s): Duncan Hall 4
Summary
P	W	D	L
Total
37	24	0	13
Test match
6	3	0	3
Opponent
P	W	D	L
Great Britain
3	0	0	3
Wales
1	1	0	0
France
2	2	0	0

Tour chronology
- Previous tour: 1937-38
- Next tour: 1952-53

The 1948–49 Kangaroo tour was the seventh Kangaroo tour, in which the Australian national rugby league team travelled to Great Britain and France and played thirty-seven matches, including the Ashes series of three Test matches against Great Britain, an international match against Wales and two Test matches against the French. It followed the tour of 1937-38 and a cessation of overseas international tours due to World War II. The next was staged in 1952-53.

== Selection Controversy ==
Earlier in the season, Newtown's Len Smith had captain-coached the Australians to a series win over the touring New Zealand team. In what turned out to be a selection controversy, Smith, a dual rugby international was then left out of the 1948 Kangaroo Tour squad altogether. After years of dignified silence on the issue Smith, who promptly retired from playing after his non-selection, would claim in the early-mid 1990s that he believed he was left out of the side as the league (NSWRFL) wanted a Mason to captain the side as Smith believed one had captained every Kangaroo touring team since the inaugural Kangaroos in 1908–09.

== The squad's leadership ==
The team was selected with Col Maxwell as captain and Bill Tyquin as vice-captain. Tour co-managers were Bill Buckley and Eric Simmonds. Maxwell captained the team on 12 occasions, including the Second Test against Great Britain.
Tyquin captained the team in 10 matches, including the exhibition match against South Australia and in three Test matches, the two victories over France and the Third Test loss to Great Britain.

Wally O'Connell captained the Kangaroos in the First Test Match against Great Britain, the international against Wales, and on six other occasions (Salford, Cumberland, St Helens, Bradford Northern, Swindon, and Yorkshire). In the matches in which neither Maxwell, Tyquin nor O’Connell played, the Kangaroos were captained by Keith Froome on 3 occasions (Dewsbury, Hull Kingston Rovers, and Lancashire), Billy Thompson on 3 occasions (Castleford, Languedoc, and Cannes) and Doug McRitchie twice (Hull & Leigh).

== Touring squad ==
The Rugby League News published a photo and the names and states of the selected players. Match details - listing surnames of both teams and the point scorers - were included in E.E. Christensen's Official Rugby League Yearbook, as was a summary of the players' point-scoring.
Benton, Brosnan, Hall, Horrigan, McMahon, Pegg, Thompson, and Tyquin were selected from Queensland clubs. Dimond, Gibbs, Hawke, and Schubert were selected from clubs in New South Wales Country areas. The balance of the squad had played for Sydney based clubs during the 1948 season.

Player	Position	Age	Weight	Club	Tests on Tour	Games	Tries	Goals	FG	Points
Henry Benton	Hooker	29	12.10 (81)	Centrals Townsville		10	0	0	0	0
Eddie Brosnan	Prop	30	15.0 (95)	Brisbane Brothers	1	17	2	0	0	6
Vic Bulgin	Fullback	20	11.10 (74)	Eastern Suburbs		16	1	1	1	7
Clive Churchill	Fullback	21	11.10 (74)	South Sydney	6	21	0	1	0	2
Les Cowie	Lock	23	12.10 (81)	South Sydney	1	20	10	0	0	30
Fred de Belin	Second-row	27	14.7 (92)	Balmain	4	15	4	0	0	12
Bobby Dimond	Wing	18	12.0 (76)	Dapto		15	9	0	0	27
Keith Froome	Halfback	27	10.8 (67)	Newtown	4	16	3	39	0	87
Alf Gibbs	Prop	27	14.6 (92)	South Newcastle	4	19	2	0	0	6
John Graves	Wing	22	12.4 (78)	South Sydney	2	20	16	35	0	118
Duncan Hall	Second-row	23	14.7 (92)	Brisbane Western Suburbs	4	21	10	0	0	30
Nevyl Hand	Prop	25	14.4 (91)	North Sydney	1	13	2	0	0	6
Johnny Hawke	Five-eighth	22	11.5 (72)	West City Canberra	5	23	11	0	0	33
Jack Holland	Prop	25	14.10 (93)	St George	2	19	3	0	0	9
Bruce Hopkins	Halfback	21	11.3 (71)	Canterbury	1	13	1	10	0	23
Jack Horrigan	Centre	24	13.1 (83)	Brisbane Valleys	2	20	16	8	0	64
Frank Johnson	Hooker	26	13.10 (87)	Newtown	2	7	1	0	0	3
Bob Lulham	Wing	21	11.9 (74)	Balmain	4	18	12	0	0	36
Col Maxwell	Centre	30	13.9 (87)	Western Suburbs	1	12	2	0	0	6
Pat McMahon	Wing	21	12.7 (79)	Toowoomba South End	6	22	12	0	0	36
Doug McRitchie	Centre	24	13.6 (85)	St George	4	14	3	0	0	9
Noel Mulligan	Second-row	22	13.10 (87)	Newtown	5	21	6	0	0	18
Wally O'Connell	Five-eighth	25	11.2 (71)	Eastern Suburbs	6	21	4	0	0	12
Len Pegg	Centre	26	12.7 (79)	South Brisbane		13	1	0	0	3
Jack Rayner	Second-row	27	14.7 (92)	South Sydney	3	24	5	1	0	17
Kevin Schubert	Hooker	21	14.7 (92)	Wollongong	6	22	1	0	0	3
Billy Thompson	Halfback	25	11.0 (70)	Toowoomba Valleys	1	15	2	0	0	6
Bill Tyquin	Lock	27	13.10 (87)	South Brisbane	4	14	6	0	0	18

Note: Tallies in the table above excludes the exhibition match against South Australia.

== Match results ==
The tourists travelled to Marseille aboard the RMS Maloja, making stops in Adelaide, Perth, Colombo, Mumbai and Aden. A scheduled exhibition match in Perth was cancelled when, due to rough seas in the Great Australian Bight, the arrival of the RMS Maloja into Fremantle was delayed. Also due to delays, arrangements were made to fly the players from Marseille into England. This was accomplished in two flights, with one plane flying into Manchester and the other into the outskirts of London.

=== Exhibition Match ===
August 11	South Australia	5–96	Australia	Adelaide Oval, Adelaide
2.15pm	Tries: 1 N. Silver; Goals: 1 H. Wood		Tries: 24; Bobby Dimond (5); Bob Lulham (5); Nevyl Hand (3); Doug McRitchie (2); Bruce Hopkins (2); Alf Gibbs (2); Jack Horrigan; Noel Mulligan; Vic Bulgin; Jack Rayner; Johnny Hawke; Goals: 12; Jack Horrigan (6); Bruce Hopkins (3); Bill Tyquin; Noel Mulligan; Henry Benton	Attendance: 4,000; Referee: B. Burns

=== In Great Britain ===
September 18	Huddersfield	22–3	Australia	Fartown Ground, Huddersfield
3.00pm	Tries: 4 P. Reid (2); R. Robson (2); Goals: 5 J. Bawden (2); P. Devery (2); P. Reid		Tries: 1 Wally O'Connell; Goals: nil	Attendance: 26,053; Gate: £ 3,530; Referee: S. Adams

September 20	Belle Vue Rangers	9–14	Australia	Belle Vue, Manchester
5.45pm	Tries: 1 S. McCormick; Goals: 3 Gregory (3)		Tries: 4 Bob Lulham (2); Bobby Dimond; Les Cowie; Goals: 1 Clive Churchill	Attendance: 7,535; Gate: £ 825; Referee: George S. Phillips

September 23	Hull	3–13	Australia	The Boulevard, Hull
5.30pm	Tries: 1 Madden; Goals: 0		Tries: 3 Jack Horrigan (2); Johnny Hawke; Goals: 2 Keith Froome (2)	Attendance: 16,616; Gate: £ 2,057; Referee: A. Hill

September 25	Wakefield Trinity	19–26	Australia	Belle Vue, Wakefield
3.00pm	Tries: 5 Fletcher (2); H. Jones; Bratley; Booth; Goals: 2 Rylance; Murphy		Tries: 6 Pat McMahon (3); Col Maxwell; Jack Horrigan; Noel Mulligan; Goals: 4 Bruce Hopkins (3); Jack Horrigan	Attendance: 20,040; Gate: £ 2,215; Referee: A.S. Dobson

September 29	Leigh	12–24	Australia	Kirkhall Lane, Leigh
5.30pm	Tries: 2 Sale; Clewy; Goals: 3 J. Ledgard (3)		Tries: 4 Bob Lulham; Doug McRitchie; Les Cowie; Duncan Hall; Goals: 6 Keith Froome (6)	Attendance: 12,968; Gate: £ 1,254; Referee: F. Smith

October 2	Salford	2–13	Australia	The Willows, Salford
3.00pm	Tries: 0 Goals: 1 J. Davies		Tries: 3 Johnny Hawke (2); Jack Rayner; Goals: 2 Keith Froome (2)	Attendance: 16,627; Gate: £ 1,871; Referee: P. Cowell

October 6	Castleford	8–10	Australia	Wheldon Road, Castleford
5.00pm	Tries: 2 Mugglestone; Booth; Goals: 1 Staines		Tries: 2 John Graves (2); Goals: 2 John Graves (2)	Attendance: 14,004; Gate: £ 1,454; Referee: L. Thorpe

=== 1st Test vs Great Britain ===
October 9
3.00pm

Great Britain	23–21	Australia
Tries: 7 Albert Pimblett (2); Stan McCormick (2); Trevor Foster (2); Dave Valentine; Goals: 1 Ernest Ward		Tries: 5 Pat McMahon (2); John Graves; Keith Froome; Duncan Hall; Goals: 3 John Graves (3)

Headingley, Leeds
Attendance: 36,529
Gate: £ 8,020
Referee: A.S. Dobson

Great Britain	Position	Australia
Jimmy Ledgard	FB	Clive Churchill
Johnny Lawrenson	WG	John Graves
Ernest Ward (c)	CE	Doug McRitchie
Albert Pimblett	CE	Johnny Hawke
Stan McCormick	WG	Pat McMahon
Willie Horne	SO	Wally O'Connell (c)
Gerry Helme	SH	Keith Froome
Ken Gee	PR	Jack Holland
Joe Egan	HK	Kevin Schubert
George Curran	PR	Alf Gibbs
Bob Nicholson	SR	Duncan Hall
Trevor Foster	SR	Jack Rayner
Dave Valentine	LF	Noel Mulligan

October 13	Cumberland (Cumbria)	5–4	Australia	Recreation Ground, Whitehaven
5.00pm	Tries: 1 W. Iveson; Goals: 1 J. Bawden		Tries: nil Goals: 2 John Graves (2)	Attendance: 8,818; Gate: £ 969; Referee: F. Smith

October 14	St Helens	10–8	Australia	Knowsley Road, St Helens
4.15pm	Tries: 2 Greenhall; Lawrence; Goals: 2 T. Stott (2)		Tries: 2 Nevyl Hand; Les Cowie; Goals: 1 John Graves	Attendance: 20,175; Gate: £ 2,036; Referee: N.T. Railton

October 16	Dewsbury	4–14	Australia	Crown Flatt, Dewsbury
3.00pm	Tries: nil Goals: 2 J. Kelly (2)	t	Tries: 2 Jack Horrigan; Bobby Dimond; Goals: 4 Keith Froome (4)	Attendance: 13,614; Gate: £ 1,481; Referee: T. Armitage

October 18	Hull Kingston Rovers	17–12	Australia	Craven Park, Hull
5.00pm	Tries: 3 Burke; Steele; Mills; Goals: 4 McWatt (3); Mills		Tries: 2 Jack Horrigan; Les Cowie; Goals: 3 John Graves (3)	Attendance: 7,614; Gate: £ 950; Referee: A. Howgate

October 20	Wigan	16–11	Australia	Central Park, Wigan
4.30pm	Tries: 4 Ratcliffe (2); Ashcroft; Lawrenson; Goals: 2 Ted Ward (2)		Tries: 3 Pat McMahon; Kevin Schubert; John Graves; Goals: 1 John Graves	Attendance: 28,554; Gate: £ 3,317; Referee: C.F. Appleton

October 23	Barrow	5–11	Australia	Craven Park, Barrow-In-Furness
3.00pm	Tries: 1 J. Lewthwaite; Goals: 1 Spooner		Tries: 3 William Thompson; Alf Gibbs; Bill Tyquin; Goals: 1 John Graves	Attendance: 13,143; Gate: £ 1,349; Referee: W. Stockley

October 27	Leeds	2–15	Australia	Headingley, Leeds
3.00pm	Tries: nil Goals: 1 Cook		Tries: 3 Jack Horrigan (2); Jack Holland; Goals: 3 Keith Froome (3)	Attendance: 13,542; Gate: £ 1,802; Referee: F. Cottam

October 30	Warrington	16–7	Australia	Wilderspool Stadium, Warrington
3.00pm	Tries: 2 G. Helme; J. Featherstone; Goals: 5 H. Palin (5)		Tries: 1 John Graves; Goals: 2 John Graves (2)	Attendance: 26,879; Gate: £ 3,608; Referee: L.J. Dalby

=== 2nd Test vs Great Britain ===
November 6
3.00pm

Great Britain	16–7	Australia
Tries: 4 Johnny Lawrenson (2); Albert Pimblett (2); Goals: 2 Ernest Ward (2)		Tries: 1 Jack Horrigan; Goals: 2 John Graves (2)

Station Road, Swinton
Attendance: 36,354
Gate: £ 6,702
Referee: George S. Phillips

Great Britain	Position	Australia
Martin Ryan	FB	Clive Churchill
Johnny Lawrenson	WG	Pat McMahon
Ernest Ward (c)	CE	Col Maxwell (c)
Albert Pimblett	CE	Jack Horrigan
Stan McCormick	WG	John Graves
Dickie Williams	SO	Wally O'Connell
Gerry Helme	SH	Billy Thompson
Ken Gee	PR	Alf Gibbs
Joe Egan	HK	Kevin Schubert
George Curran	PR	Nevyl Hand
Bob Nicholson	SR	Jack Rayner
Trevor Foster	SR	Noel Mulligan
Dave Valentine	LF	Bill Tyquin

November 10	Bradford Northern	7–21	Australia	Odsal Stadium, Bradford
3.00pm	Tries: 1 E. Batten; Goals: 2 Carmichael (2)		Tries: 5 Jack Horrigan (3); Pat McMahon (2); Goals: 3 John Graves (2)	Attendance: 13,287; Gate: £ 1,525; Referee: W. Hemmings

November 13	Workington Town	10–7	Australia	Borough Park, Workington
11.00am	Tries: 2 L. Graham; A. Pepperell; Goals: 2 A. Paskins (2)		Tries: 1 Les Cowie; Goals: 2 John Graves (2)	Attendance: 13,253; Gate: £ 1,419; Referee: C.F. Appleton

November 17	Swinton	0–21	Australia	Station Road, Swinton
2.45pm	Tries: nil Goals: nil		Tries: 5 Bob Lulham (2); Pat McMahon; Jack Horrigan; Jack Rayner; Goals: 3 Bruce Hopkins (2); Jack Horrigan	Attendance: 6,041; Gate: £ 663; Referee: J. Kemp

=== Only Test vs Wales ===
November 20
2.30pm

Wales	5–12	Australia
Tries: 1 Gareth Price; Goals: 1 Ted Ward		Tries: 2 Johnny Hawke; Jack Holland; Goals: 3 Bruce Hopkins (2); Jack Horrigan

St. Helen's Rugby Ground, Swansea
Attendance: 9,224
Gate: £ 1,375
Referee: Norman Railton

Wales	Posit.	Australia
Joe Jones	FB	Clive Churchill (c)
Emlyn Walters	WG	Pat McMahon
Ted Ward (c)	CE	Jack Horrigan
Gareth Price	CE	Johnny Hawke
Denis Boocker	WG	Bob Lulham
Leonard Constance	SO	Wally O'Connell
Harry Royal	SH	Bruce Hopkins
Frank Whitcombe	PR	Jack Holland
Frank Osmond	HK	Kevin Schubert
Elwyn Gwyther	PR	Eddie Brosnan
George Parsons	SR	Jack Rayner
Doug Phillips	SR	Fred de Belin
Ike Owens	LF	Les Cowie

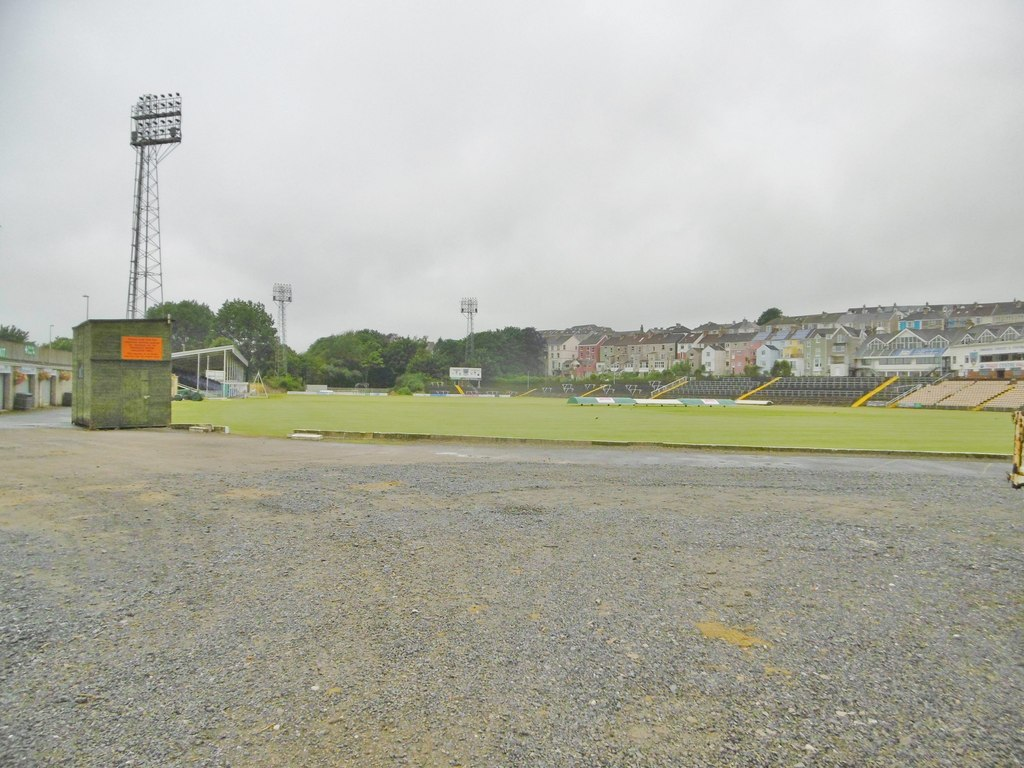

November 24	Yorkshire	5–2	Australia	Headingley, Leeds
2.30pm	Tries: 1 Riches; Goals: 1 J. Ledgard		Tries: nil Goals: 1 Bruce Hopkins	Attendance: 5,100; Gate: £ 662; Referee: Tom McMahon Jnr

November 27	Halifax	8–10	Australia	Thrum Hall, Halifax
2.30pm	Tries: 2 Ward; Kielty; Goals: 1 Chalkley		Tries: 2 Bob Lulham; Jack Holland; Goals: 2 Jack Horrigan (2)	Attendance: 6,520; Gate: £ 763; Referee: M. Coates

December 4	Oldham	7–27	Australia	Watersheddings, Oldham
2.30pm	Tries: 1 Glanville; Goals: 2 Barraclough (2)		Tries: 7 Johnny Hawke (2); Duncan Hall (2); Bob Lulham; Keith Froome; Bill Tyquin; Goals: 3 Keith Froome (3)	Attendance: 14,798; Gate: £ 1,868; Referee: George S. Phillips

December 8	Lancashire	13–8	Australia	Central Park, Wigan
2.30pm	Tries: 3 S. McCormick (2); E. Ashcroft; Goals: 2 H. Palin (2)		Tries: 2 Pat McMahon; Jack Horrigan; Goals: 1 Keith Froome	Attendance: 11,788; Gate: £ 1,378; Referee: George S. Phillips

December 11	Widnes	8–18	Australia	Naughton Park, Widnes
2.15pm	Tries: 2 Jolley; Whittaker; Goals: 1 Hughes		Tries: 4 John Graves; Len Pegg; Col Maxwell; Johnny Hawke; Goals: 3 John Graves (3)	Attendance: 10,761; Gate: £ 1,225; Referee: A.S. Dobson

=== in France ===
December 25	Pyrenees	3–43	Australia	Stade Chapou, Toulouse
3.00pm	Tries: 1 Espelugue; Goals: nil		Tries: 9 Bob Lulham (3); Bobby Dimond (2); Keith Froome; Noel Mulligan; Doug McRitchie; Wally O'Connell; Goals: 8 Keith Froome (8)	Attendance: 6,806; Gate: F 949,950; Referee: Bonnemore

December 26	XIII Catalan	20–5	Australia	Stade Jean Lafou, Perpignan
3.00pm	Tries: 4 Negfier; Blanc; Maso; Case (penalty); Goals: 4 Comes (3); Field goals: De Jean		Tries: 1 Nevyl Hand; Goals: 1 John Graves	Attendance: 12,254; Gate: F 1,996,510; Referee: Martin

January 2	AS Carcassonne	8–13	Australia	Stade Albert Domec, Carcassonne
3.00pm	Tries: nil Goals: 4 Llari (4)		Tries: 3 Duncan Hall; Bob Lulham; Jack Horrigan; Goals: 2 Jack Horrigan (2)	Attendance: 7,990; Gate: F 1,391,525; Referee: Rene Guidicelli

January 8	Languedoc	0–38	Australia	Stade de Sauclières, Béziers
	Tries: nil Goals: nil		Tries: 10; Johnny Hawke (2); Les Cowie (2); John Graves; Bobby Dimond; William Thompson; Bruce Hopkins; Eddie Brosnan; Frank Johnson; Goals: 4 John Graves (4)	Attendance: 2,300; Referee: Goyetz

=== 1st Test vs France ===
January 9
3.00pm

France	10–29	Australia
Tries: 2 Ode Lespes; Ulysse Negrier; Goals: 2 Gaston Comes (2)		Tries: 7 Bill Tyquin (2); Pat McMahon; Wally O'Connell; Fred de Belin; Alf Gibbs; Duncan Hall; Goals: 4 Keith Froome (4)

Stade Municipal, Marseille
Attendance: 15,796
Gate: F 2,696,600
Referee: A.S. Dobson

France	Position	Australia
Gaston Comes	FB	Clive Churchill
Ode Lespes	WG	Pat McMahon
Joseph Crespo	CE	Doug McRitchie
Albert Kaemph	CE	Johnny Hawke
Robert Casse	WG	Bob Lulham
Pierre Taillantou	SO	Wally O'Connell
Jean Dop	SH	Keith Froome
Gaston Calixte (c)	PR	Alf Gibbs
Ulysse Negrier	HK	Kevin Schubert
Élie Brousse	PR	Duncan Hall
Louis Mazon	SR	Noel Mulligan
Martin Martin	SR	Fred de Belin
Andre Beraud	LF	Bill Tyquin (c)

January 10	Cannes	7–60	Australia	Stade Hesperides, Cannes
	Tries: 1 Durnand; Goals: 2 Fachant (2)		Tries: 16; John Graves (5); Bobby Dimond (3); Jack Horrigan (2); Les Cowie (2); Fred de Belin (2); Eddie Brosnan; Vic Bulgin; Goals: 6 Bruce Hopkins (2); John Graves; Jack Horrigan; Vic Bulgin; Jack Rayner	Attendance: 1,100; Referee: Bernard

January 15	France XIII	8–30	Australia	Stade Municipal, Valence
2.30pm	Tries: 2 Blanc; Gacia; Goals: 1 Andre		Tries: 8 Jack Rayner (3); John Graves (2); Bobby Dimond; Les Cowie; Duncan Hall; Goals: 3 John Graves (3)	Attendance: 4,385; Gate: F 620,250; Referee: Rene Guidicelli

January 16	Lyon/Roanne	10–29	Australia	Stade Municipal, Lyon
3.00pm	Tries: 2 Poug; Trescazes ()penalty); Goals: 2 Barre teau (2)		Tries: 7 Johnny Hawke (2); Bill Tyquin (2); Pat McMahon; Wally O'Connell; Duncan Hall; Goals: 4 Keith Froome (4)	Attendance: 4,514; Gate: F 855,750; Referee: Donnemaure

January 17	Cavaillon	5–22	Australia	Stade Municipal, Avignon
	Tries: 1 Prat; Goals: 1 Lopez		Tries: 6 Noel Mulligan (3); John Graves (2); Doug McRitchie; Goals: 2 John Graves (2)	Attendance: 4,500; Referee: Cassan

=== 2nd Test vs France ===
January 23
3.00pm

France	0–10	Australia
Tries: nil Goals: nil		Tries: 2 Duncan Hall; Noel Mulligan; Goals: 2 Keith Froome (2)

Stade Municipal, Bordeaux
Attendance: 17,365
Gate: F 2,870,850
Referee: A. Pascall

France	Position	Australia
Jean Barreteau	FB	Clive Churchill
Fredo Trescazes	WG	Pat McMahon
Paul Dejean	CE	Doug McRitchie
Robert Caillou	CE	Johnny Hawke
Raymond Contrastin	WG	Bob Lulham
Pierre Taillantou	SO	Wally O'Connell
Joseph Crespo	SH	Keith Froome
Gaston Calixte (c)	PR	Duncan Hall
Henri Riu	HK	Kevin Schubert
Ulysse Negrier	PR	Alf Gibbs
Paul Bartoletti	SR	Fred de Belin
Martin Martin	SR	Noel Mulligan
Ambroise Ulma	LF	Bill Tyquin (c)

=== 3rd Test v Great Britain ===
This Test Match was originally intended to be played on December 18, 1948, Due to dense fog at the ground (Odsal) in the hours prior to the match, play was abandoned and the match rescheduled to occur after the French leg of the tour. Curiously, the fog of December 18 cleared around the scheduled time, 2.45pm, of kick-off. The morning of January 29 again saw fog at the ground (Odsal), but this cleared by lunch-time and the postponed match was played out under clear skies.

January 29
2.45pm

Great Britain	23–9	Australia
Tries: 5 George Curran (2); Ernest Ward; Stan McCormick; Dickie Williams; Goals: 4 Ernest Ward (4)		Tries: 3 Duncan Hall; Bob Lulham; Fred de Belin; Goals: nil

Odsal Stadium, Bradford
Attendance: 43,500
Gate: £ 6,877
Referee: George S. Phillips

Great Britain	Position	Australia
Martin Ryan	FB	Clive Churchill
Johnny Lawrenson	WG	Bob Lulham
Albert Pimblett	CE	Doug McRitchie
Ernest Ward (c)	CE	Johnny Hawke
Stan McCormick	WG	Pat McMahon
Dickie Williams	SO	Wally O'Connell
Gerry Helme	SH	Keith Froome
George Curran	PR	Alf Gibbs
Joe Egan	HK	Kevin Schubert
Ken Gee	PR	Duncan Hall
Bill Hudson	SR	Fred de Belin
Jim Featherstone	SR	Noel Mulligan
Dave Valentine	LF	Bill Tyquin (c)
