= List of Australia national rugby league team coaches =

The following people have coached the Australia national rugby league team.

== List of coaches ==
Image	No.	Name	First match in tenure	Last match in tenure	Games	Wins	Draws	Losses	Win%	Honours	Source
	1	Albert Johnston	17 June 1946	20 July 1946	3	0	1	2	0.00		
	2	Len Smith	29 May 1948	12 June 1948	2	1	0	1	50.00		
	3	Col Maxwell	9 October 1948	29 January 1949	6	3	0	3	50.00		
	4	Keith Froome	17 September 1949	8 October 1949	2	1	0	1	50.00		
	5	Vic Hey	12 June 1950	21 July 1951	6	3	0	3	50.00		
	6	Clive Churchill	9 June 1952	18 July 1953	12	4	0	8	33.33		
		Vic Hey	12 June 1954	23 July 1955	11	6	0	5	54.54		
	7	Ken Kearney	9 June 1956	3 January 1957	9	7	0	2	77.78		
	8	Dick Poole	15 June 1957	22 June 1957	3	3	0	0	100.00	1957 World Cup	
	9	Norm Robinson	14 June 1958	19 July 1958	3	1	0	2	33.33		
		Clive Churchill	13 June 1959	16 July 1960	12	7	1	4	58.33		
	10	Keith Barnes	24 September 1960	8 October 1960	3	2	0	1	66.67		
	11	Brian Carlson	1 July 1961	8 July 1961	2	1	0	1	50.00		
	12	Harry Bath	9 June 1962	14 July 1962	3	1	0	2	33.33		
		Clive Churchill	8 June 1963	27 July 1963	5	4	0	1	80.00		
	13	Arthur Summons	16 October 1963	18 January 1964	6	4	0	2	66.67		
	14	Reg Gasnier	13 June 1964	18 July 1964	3	3	0	0	100.00		
	15	Ian Walsh	19 June 1965	23 July 1966	5	3	0	2	60.00		
		Reg Gasnier	10 June 1967	7 January 1968	9	5	1	3	55.56		
		Harry Bath	25 May 1968	7 June 1969	6	5	0	1	83.33	1968 World Cup	
		Arthur Summons	6 June 1970	4 July 1970	3	1	0	2	33.3		
		Harry Bath	21 October 1970	11 November 1972	11	6	1	4	54.54	1970 World Cup	
	16	Graeme Langlands	3 November 1973	12 November 1975	17	13	1	3	76.47	1975 World Cup	
	17	Terry Fearnley	29 May 1977	25 June 1977	4	4	0	0	100.00	1977 World Cup	
	18	Frank Stanton	24 June 1978	18 December 1982	37	33	0	4	89.19		
	19	Arthur Beetson	12 June 1983	9 July 1983	2	1	0	1	50.00		
		Frank Stanton	9 June 1984	7 July 1984	3	3	0	0	100.00		
		Terry Fearnley	18 June 1985	7 July 1985	3	2	0	1	66.67		
	20	Don Furner	6 July 1986	9 October 1988	31	29	0	2	93.55	1985–1988 World Cup	
	21	Bob Fulton	4 July 1989	24 April 1998	75	67	1	7	89.33	1989–1992 World Cup, 1995 World Cup	
	22	Wayne Bennett	9 October 1998	16 October 1998	2	2	0	0	100.00		
	23	Chris Anderson	23 April 1999	22 November 2003	27	24	0	3	88.89	2000 World Cup; 1999 Tri-Nations	
		Wayne Bennett	23 April 2004	27 November 2005	15	11	1	3	73.33	2004 Tri-Nations	
	24	Ricky Stuart	5 May 2006	23 November 2008	14	12	0	2	85.71	2006 Tri-Nations	
	25	Tim Sheens	8 May 2009	3 May 2015	31	26	1	4	83.87	2013 World Cup; 2009 Four Nations, 2011 Four Nations	
	26	Mal Meninga	6 May 2016	10 November 2024	28	25	0	3	89.29	2017 World Cup; 2016 Four Nations; 2019 World Cup 9s 2019 Pacific Championship; 2021 World Cup; 2024 Pacific Championship	
	27	Kevin Walters	25 October 2025	Incumbent	8	8	0	0	100.00	2025 Ashes; 2026 World Cup	

== Super League ==
Image	No.	Name	First match in tenure	Last match in tenure	Games	Wins	Draws	Losses	Win%	Honours	Source
	1	John Lang	25 April 1997	16 November 1997	5	2	0	3	40.00		
