= Tyquin =

Tyquin may refer to two Australian representative rugby league players who were brothers:

- Bill Tyquin (1919–1999)
- Tom Tyquin (1932–2015)
