= Caroline Grills =

Australian serial killer (c. 1888 – 1960)

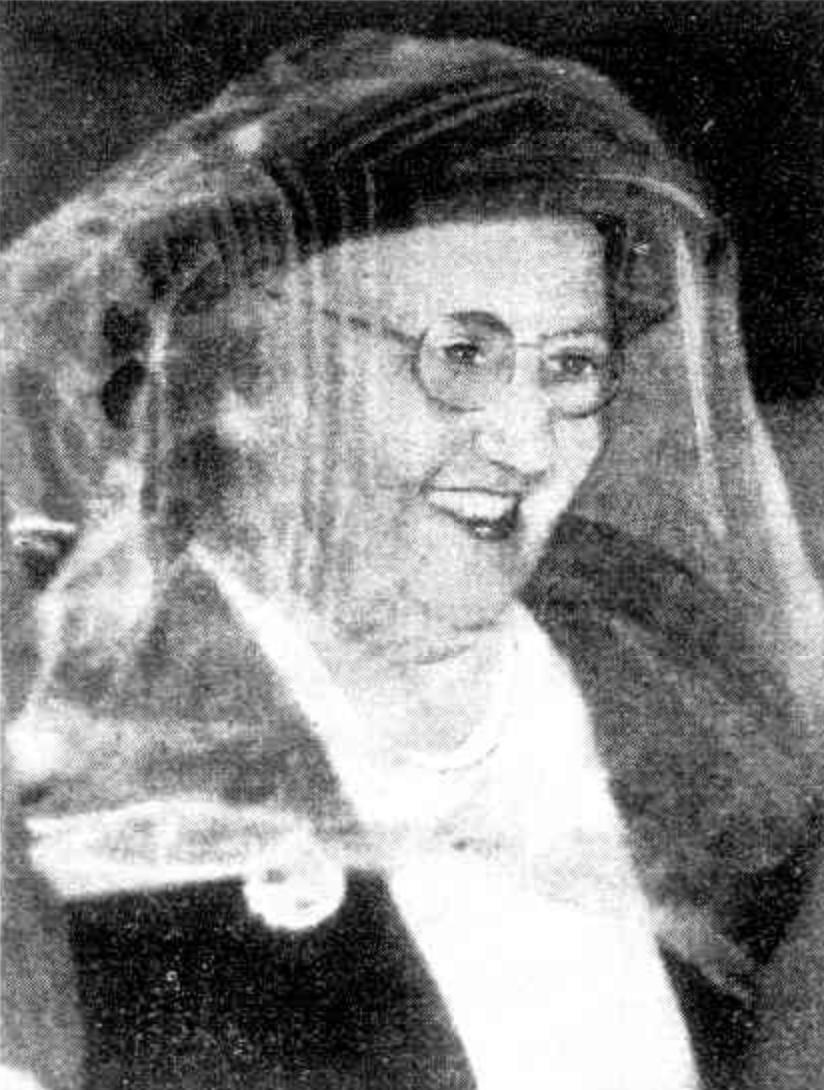
- Caroline Grills, arriving at Sydney Central Court on 9 July 1953
- Born: Caroline Michelson c. 1888; Balmain, New South Wales, Australia
- Status: Deceased
- Died: 6 October 1960 (aged 71–72); Randwick, New South Wales, Australia
- Other names: Aunty Carrie, "Aunt Thally" whilst imprisoned
- Conviction: Murder
- Penalty: Death; commuted to life imprisonment

Details
- Victims: 4 (plus 3 attempted murders)
- Span of crimes: 1947–1953
- Country: Australia
- State: New South Wales
- Date apprehended: April 1953

Caroline Grills (née Mickelson; between 1888 and 1890 – 6 October 1960) was an Australian serial killer who poisoned her victims. She was predominantly a comfort killer, who murdered well-off members of her extended family to maintain a respectable lifestyle, but her later murders had less clear motives.

== Biography ==
Caroline Michelson was the daughter of Mary Preiers and George Michelson in Balmain, Sydney, and born between 1888 and 1890. She married Richard William Grills on 22 April 1908, with whom she had four sons.

She first became a murder suspect in 1947 after the deaths of four family members: her 87-year-old stepmother Christine Mickelson; relatives by marriage Angelina Thomas and John Lundberg; and sister in law Mary Anne Mickelson. Authorities tested tea she had given to two additional family members (Christine Downey and John Downey of Redfern) on 13 April 1953, and detected the then-common household rat poison, thallium. At the time, thallium was easy to buy over the counter in New South Wales. Mickelson had inherited from Grills' father a house in Gladesville, and Grills was speculated to have murdered her to inherit it. Similarly, Thomas was a close family friend of the Grills couple and had left her holiday home in the Blue Mountains to the couple.

Grills, a short woman who wore thick-rimmed dark glasses, commonly served her friends and in-laws tea, cakes and biscuits. She appeared in court charged with four murders and three attempted murders (the third being Eveline Lundberg, of Redfern, Christine Downey's mother) in October 1953. She was convicted on 15 October 1953 and sentenced to death, but her sentence was later changed to life in prison. She became affectionately known as "Aunt Thally" (a punning reference to "Aunt Sally") to other inmates of Sydney's Long Bay Prison. In October 1960, she was rushed to the Prince Henry Hospital at Randwick where she died from peritonitis from a ruptured gastric ulcer. In the months that followed more cases of thallium poisoning were stated, including notably, prominent Australian Rugby League footballer Bobby Lulham.

== See also ==
- List of serial killers by country
- Recipe for Murder (film)
