= Lulham =

Lulham may refer to:

- Lulham, Herefordshire, England
- Lulham, Iran, a village in West Azerbaijan Province, Iran
- Lulham (surname)
