= Recipe for Murder (film) =

2011 Australian television film

- Genre: Docudrama
- Written by: Sonia Bible
- Directed by: Sonia Bible
- Starring: Anne Looby; Betty Tougher; Aimee Horne
- Narrated by: Dan Wyllie
- Country of origin: Australia

Production
- Producer: Susan Lambert
- Running time: 52 minutes

Original release
- Release: May 2011

Recipe for Murder is a 52-minute Australian TV docudrama film released in May 2011. It recounts some of the history of a series of murders in post-World War II Sydney by women using thallium sulphate poisons. It was written and directed by Sonia Bible, produced by Susan Lambert and narrated by Dan Wyllie.

== Subjects ==
The crimes of three murderesses, Yvonne Fletcher, Caroline Grills and Veronica Monty are examined in the context of a wave of dozens of thallium poisonings that took place in Sydney in the period 1947–1953. The events are related to post-war poverty and social stresses, and to the ready availability of thallium sulphate rat poisons which could be easily administered to humans in food and drink, being virtually tasteless and odourless. The three were convicted and imprisoned, but the documentary suggests that many more murders by other persons could have remained undetected. As a result of these events, the Australian states began to ban unrestricted availability of thallium in 1952.

== Cast ==
- Anne Looby – Yvonne Fletcher
- Betty Tougher – Caroline Grills
- Aimee Horne – Veronica Monty
- James Anderson – Bobby Lulham
- Matthew Dale – Detective Don Ferguson
- Grant Garland – Detective Sergeant Fred Krahe

== Reception ==
The film won a Silver Hugo at the Chicago International Film Festival and screened to a large audience on the ABC in 2011. Writer/director Sonia Bible was also awarded a NSW Premier's History Award for 2011.
