= Gareth Price (disambiguation) =

Gareth Price may refer to:

- Gareth Price (rugby league) (1917-1992), Welsh Rugby union and Rugby league player
- Gareth Price (born 1980), Welsh Rugby union and Rugby league player
- Gareth Price (footballer) (1970-1998), English footballer, see List of Bury F.C. players (1–24 appearances)
