= Pimblett =

Pimblett is a surname. Notable people with the surname include:

- Albert Pimblett (1919–2001), English rugby league player
- Geoff Pimblett (1944–2018), English rugby league player
- Paddy Pimblett (born 1995), English mixed martial artist
