= Jack Horrigan (rugby league) =

Australian rugby league player

Personal information
- Full name: John Horrigan
- Born: 8 August 1924; Brisbane, QLD, Australia
- Died: 2004 (aged 79–80)

Playing information
- Position: Centre
Representative
Years	Team	Pld	T	G	FG	P
1947–48	Queensland	5	0	5	0	10
1948	Australia	2	1	1	0	5

John Horrigan (8 August 1924 – 2004) was an Australian rugby league player.

Primarily a centre, Horrigan was playing for Valleys when he gained a surprise selection to the Kangaroos squad for the 1948–49 tour of Europe. He won his place ahead of captain Len Smith, a controversial omission. Scoring 16 tries across all tour fixtures, Horrigan was equal with John Graves as their top try-getter, a tally which included a hat-trick against Bradford Northern. He however didn't feature in all of the Test matches, only getting opportunities in the 2nd Test against Great Britain and one-off Test against Wales.

Horrigan was appointed player-coach of Ayr on his return from Europe in 1949.
