= Bill Tyquin =

Former Australia international rugby league footballer

Personal information
- Full name: Ignatius William Tyquin
- Born: 15 January 1919 Brisbane, Queensland, Australia
- Died: 17 August 1999 (aged 80) Brisbane, Queensland, Australia

Playing information
- Position: Lock
Club
Years	Team	Pld	T	G	FG	P
1938–39	Souths Brisbane
1940	Brothers (Brisbane)
1941	St. George	15	8	0	0	24
1945–50	Souths (Brisbane)
	Total	15	8	0	0	24
Representative
Years	Team	Pld	T	G	FG	P
1941	New South Wales	1	0	0	0	0
1945–49	Queensland	12	0	0	0	0
1948–56	Australia	12	3	0	0	9
- Source: As of 11 June 2019
- Relatives: Tom Tyquin (brother)
- Military career
- Allegiance: Australia
- Branch: Australian Army
- Service years: 1941-1946
- Unit: 2/5 Armoured Regiment
- Conflicts: World War II

Bill Tyquin (1919–1999) was an Australian professional rugby league footballer who played in the 1930s, 1940s and 1950s. An Australia national representative lock forward, he played in 6 Test matches between 1948 and 1949, captaining on 3 occasions. Tyquin played his club football in both Brisbane and Sydney, gaining selection for the Queensland and New South Wales teams. He was a member of the St George's 1941 NSWRFL Premiership-winning team, and ultimately was named in the Souths Logan Magpies team of the century.

== Club career ==
Tyquin was born in Brisbane on 15 January 1919. He went to school there and played for the city's the Souths and the Brothers clubs before World War II. Stationed in Sydney with the AIF during the war he played the 1941 season with St. George and played in St George's inaugural Grand Final win in 1941. In that game he was sent off by the referee after a clash with Easts rival Jack Arnold. After the war he returned to Souths Brisbane playing five seasons from 1945 to 1950 and from where he enjoyed representative success.

Bill Tyquin 1941 premiership winner for the St.George club

== Playing style ==
Whiticker's reference acclaims Bill as the premier lock forward of the Australian game in the five-year period immediately after WWII. He asserts that Tyquin was a great cover defender who had one of the biggest punt kicks in the game at that time.

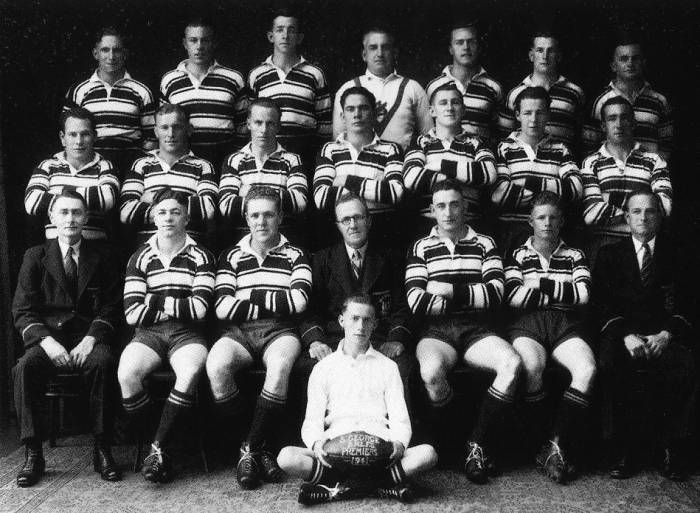
Tyquin (middle centre) in St. George's 1941 premiership-winning team

== Representative career ==
He first represented for Queensland in 1945 and then regularly over the next 5 years making 8 appearances against New South Wales as well as captaining Queensland in 1948 against a touring New Zealand side.

He made his Test debut against New Zealand in the first Test of the 1948 series in Sydney and played in both Tests. He was subsequently named as vice-captain to Col Maxwell for the 1949 Kangaroo Tour of England and France an appointment overshadowed by the controversial non-selection of Len Smith. On that 1949 tour Tyquin played in 4 Tests and 10 minor tour matches. He enjoyed the honour of captaining Australia in two Tests against France and then in the third dead rubber Test against Great Britain in Bradford.

== War service ==
Tyquin enlisted in the Australian Army in 1941. He was a Sergeant in the 2/5 Armoured Regiment. He was discharged in 1946.

== Post playing ==
After football Tyquin worked in the wholesale liquor industry. He devoted many years to administration of the Souths Brisbane Leagues club and was its president during the 1970s. He spent many years as president of the Queensland Irish Association. As well as contributing to other areas of the Brisbane community.

Preceded by Wally O'Connell	Australian national rugby league captain 1949	Succeeded by Keith Froome
