= Craig Dimond =

Australian rugby league footballer

Personal information
- Born: 13 March 1964 (age 61) Sydney, New South Wales, Australia

Playing information
- Height: 185 cm (6 ft 1 in)
- Weight: 88 kg (13 st 12 lb)
- Position: Second-row, Lock
Club
Years	Team	Pld	T	G	FG	P
1983–84	Illawarra Steelers	19	2	0	0	8
1985–88	Cronulla Sharks	75	12	0	0	48
1989	Canberra Raiders	14	1	0	0	4
1990–93	Cronulla Sharks	67	7	0	0	28
1994	Illawarra Steelers	5	2	0	0	8
	Total	180	24	0	0	96
- Father: Peter Dimond
- Relatives: Bobby Dimond (uncle)

Craig Dimond (born 13 March 1964) is an Australian former professional rugby league footballer who played in the 1980s and 1990s. He played his club football career for the Illawarra Steelers, Cronulla-Sutherland Sharks and Canberra Raiders. He is the son of Peter Dimond, nephew of Bobby Dimond, both Australian former rugby league test players, and father of Australian Idol contestant Amali Dimond.

== Playing career ==
Dimond played junior rugby league for Dapto as a second row forward and was recommended to the then newly formed entity the Illawarra Steelers in 1982. Illawarra coach Allan Fitzgibbon gave Dimond his first grade debut in round 2 of the 1983 season at the age of 19. He played 17 matches in his debut season, Dimond did poorly the following year, only making two appearances for the Steelers in the 1984 season, but the Cronulla-Sutherland Sharks thought he had potential and signed him for 1985.

Dimond made his first appearance for Cronulla in round 3 of the 1985 season in their 32−8 loss to the Balmain Tigers at Leichhardt Oval, coincidentally, Dimond also scored his first career try in that match. Dimond obtained a regular place in the Cronulla side and gradually showed he had exceptional ball skills as well as the ability to run which he had shown at Illawarra. From 1985 onwards, Dimond was more of a regular first grade player. His first stint at the Sharks ended at the conclusion of the 1988 season, in which they won the minor premiership for the first time in the club's history. The Sharks narrowly missed out on Grand Final qualification that year when they lost 9−2 in the preliminary final to the Balmain Tigers at the Sydney Football Stadium.

In 1989, Dimond played for the Canberra Raiders. He made 14 appearances with the Raiders in what was a triumphant season in which they would go on to win their first premiership title, but injuries mid-season would see him miss out on the 1989 Grand Final. Despite the Raiders' premiership success, Dimond returned to Cronulla for the 1990 season.

Dimond returned to Cronulla in 1990 as a much more mature player. His ability to consistently offload and send players into gaps (despite being small for a forward at around 88 kilograms) created many tries for Cronulla. In addition to his superb ball-playing skills, Dimond also had a very high work rate in defense. On 31 May 1991, whilst playing against the Brisbane Broncos at Lang Park, Dimond made a then record 67 tackles in his side's 40−2 loss to the Broncos, which was beaten 16 years later by Nathan Hindmarsh of the Parramatta Eels who had 69 tackles in a match in 2007. Dimond's second stint at the Sharks ended at the conclusion of the 1993 season.

In 1994, Dimond returned to the Illawarra Steelers. Dimond made 5 appearances in his second stint at the Steelers before announcing his retirement at the conclusion of the 1994 season. Dimond finished his rugby league career having played 180 games and scoring 24 tries.

=== Matches and point scoring summary ===
Team	Years	Matches	Tries	Goals	Field Goals	Points
Illawarra	1983–84, 1994	24	4	0	0	16
Cronulla	1985–88, 1990-93	142	19	0	0	76
Canberra	1989	14	1	0	0	4
Total	1983–94	180	24	0	0	96
