= Bill Buckley (rugby league) =

Australian rugby league footballer & administrator

Personal information
- Full name: William George Buckley
- Born: 8 August 1906 Petersham, New South Wales, Australia
- Died: 17 April 1973 (aged 66) Concord, New South Wales, Australia

Playing information
- Position: Hooker
Club
Years	Team	Pld	T	G	FG	P
1927–28	Newtown	5	0	0	0	0
- Source: Whiticker/Hudson

William George Buckley OBE (8 August 1906 – 17 April 1973) was an Australian rugby league footballer and administrator.

== Playing career ==
A front rower, Buckley played 75 lower grade matches for Newtown. He broke his leg in the 1928 NSWRFL season and his first grade career was over.

== Administrative career ==
After playing, Buckley joined the New South Wales Rugby Football League General Committee as delegate of Newtown in 1940. He was co-manager of the 1948–49 Kangaroo tour of Great Britain and France.

When NSWRFL president Jersey Flegg died in 1960, Buckley replaced him and also became Chairman of the Australian Rugby League, a position he remained in from 1960 until his death in 1973.

He was replaced as NSWRFL president by Kevin Humphreys.

== Accolades ==
Bill Buckley was made a Life Member of Newtown and the Australian Rugby League and was also a member of the SCG Trust. In 1968 Bill Buckley was appointed as an Officer of the Order of the British Empire (OBE) for services to sport, in recognition of service to rugby league and the community.

== Death ==
Buckley died at Concord Repatriation Hospital on 17 April 1973 after battling a long illness. He was survived by his wife Doris and his son, Terry. A large service was held for Bill Buckley at St James' Church, Sydney on 19 April 1973, followed by a cremation at Eastern Suburbs Memorial Park. The Premier of New South Wales, Sir Robert Askin stated in The Sydney Morning Herald: "Bill Buckley will be missed in the many circles that he moved, especially in Rugby League where he laboured so hard".

== Accolades ==
The Public High School Competition "The Buckley Shield" and the Metropolitan Cup's top individual award "The Buckley Medal" recognises Bill Buckley's contribution to Rugby League.

Bill Buckley is also an inductee of the Sports Australia Hall of Fame, as an administrator.

== Sources ==
- Bill Buckley at nrlstats.com
