= Henry Benton =

Australian rugby league player

Personal information
- Full name: Henry Alexander Benton
- Born: 18 March 1919; Townsville, QLD, Australia
- Died: 12 September 1989 (aged 70); Ballina, NSW, Australia

Playing information
- Position: Hooker
Representative
Years	Team	Pld	T	G	FG	P
1948–49	Queensland	7	0	0	0	0
1948–49	Australia

Henry Alexander Benton (18 March 1919 – 12 September 1989) was an Australian rugby league player.

Born in Townsville, Benton was a hooker, widely known by the nickname "Frosty".

Benton won an Australia call up for the 1948–49 tour of Europe, becoming merely the second North Queenslander after Melville Glasheen to play for his country. The team had a stopover in Adelaide on the way over and Benton made his debut against South Australia. He featured in 10 minor matches in Great Britain and France.

In 1949, Benton captained Townsville to the Foley Shield title.
