= Lulham (surname) =

Lulham is a surname. Notable people with the surname include:

- Bob Lulham (1926–1986), Australian rugby league footballer
- Chris Lulham (born 2003), British racing driver
- Edwin Lulham (1865–1940), British cricketer
