= Alf Gibbs =

Australian rugby league player

Personal information
- Born: 15 April 1920; Merewether, NSW, Australia
- Died: 2 December 1983 (aged 63)

Playing information
- Position: Front-row
Club
Years	Team	Pld	T	G	FG	P
1949–50	Newtown Jets	31	2	0	0	6
Representative
Years	Team	Pld	T	G	FG	P
1946–47	New South Wales	9	3	0	0	9
1948–49	Australia	5	1	0	0	3

Alf Gibbs (15 April 1920 – 2 December 1983) was an Australian former rugby league player.

== Biography ==
Raised in Newcastle, Gibbs was the youngest of four rugby league playing brothers, the most famous of which being Kangaroos forward Jim. He played his early rugby league with South Newcastle.

Gibbs represented Australia as a front-rower in five Test matches on the 1948/49 tour of Europe, appearing three times against Great Britain and twice against France.

In 1949 and 1950, Gibbs played first-grade for the Newtown Jets.

Gibbs later coached the Leichhardt Wanderers.
