= Eddie Brosnan =

Australia international rugby league player

Personal information
- Full name: Edward Brosnan
- Born: 31 March 1918
- Died: 5 August 1992 (aged 74) Sandgate, Queensland, Australia

Playing information
- Position: Prop
Representative
Years	Team	Pld	T	G	FG	P
1946–48	Queensland	10	3	0	0	9
1948	Australia	2	0	0	0	0
- Relatives: Bob Bennett (nephew); Wayne Bennett (nephew)

Edward Brosnan (31 March 1918 – 5 August 1992) was an Australian rugby league player.

Brosnan started his sporting career in Toowoomba as a rugby union player and earned Queensland interstate selection for a match against "The Rest", then in 1940 made the switch to rugby league.

A prop, Brosnan competed in the Bulimba Cup for Toowoomba and was with Brisbane club Brothers when he made his Queensland representative debut in 1946. He was due to make his debut for Australia in the final Test of their 1946 home series against Great Britain, but had to withdraw due to an injured ankle. Two years later, Brosnan got another opportunity for a series against New Zealand and featured in the opening Test, before again succumbing to injury. He also made the 1948–49 tour of Great Britain and played the match against Wales in Swansea.

Brosnan, a policeman, was the uncle of rugby league coach Wayne Bennett.
