= Peter Dimond =

Australia rugby league footballer (1938–2021)

Personal information
- Full name: Peter James Dimond
- Born: 28 November 1938 Dapto, New South Wales, Australia
- Died: 21 April 2021 (aged 82)

Playing information
- Position: Wing
Club
Years	Team	Pld	T	G	FG	P
1955–57	Dapto
1958–67	Western Suburbs	155	84	5	2	266
1968–69	Souths (Newcastle)
1970–72	Maitland
	Total	155	84	5	2	266
Representative
Years	Team	Pld	T	G	FG	P
1957–69	NSW Country	3	0	2	0	4
1958–63	New South Wales	4	5	0	0	15
1958–66	Australia	10	3	0	0	9
1967	NSW City	1	0	0	0	0
- Relatives: Craig Dimond (son); Bobby Dimond (brother)

Peter Dimond (28 November 1938 – 21 April 2021) was an Australian rugby league footballer who played his club rugby league for Western Suburbs. Born in Dapto, New South Wales, he is the younger brother of former Australian test player and New South Wales representative Bobby Dimond. He is also the father of former Illawarra Steelers, Cronulla Sharks and Canberra Raiders utility Craig Dimond. Peter was named both in the Western Suburbs Team of the Century and the Wests Tigers Team of the Century.

== Playing career ==
Dimond was selected at age 14 in a New South Wales schoolboy side in a curtain raiser to the 1952 Australia and New Zealand Test match.

While still a teenager, Dimond was selected to represent Australia in three test matches against Great Britain. Peter Dimond joined Western Suburbs in 1958. He played in all four of the club's grand final losses to the great St. George side. They lost 20–9 in 1958 with Dimond playing five-eighth, 22–0 in 1961, 9–6 in 1962 and 8–3 in 1963.

He was called up to play on the Kangaroo tour in 1963-64 where he played in all six test matches. His tour highlight being his two tries in his country's 50–12 victory at Station Road, Swinton near Manchester that was dubbed the 'Swinton Massacre' and it was also the match that secured the Ashes for Australia on British soil for the first time. His final appearance in the Australian team came in the third and deciding test match against Great Britain in 1966 when Australia again retained the Ashes. At the time he left the club, Dimond held the record of a total of 83 tries for Western Suburbs. After leaving Western Suburbs he played out the rest of his career for a local Newcastle team in the early 1970s.

== Accolades ==
On Friday 24 September 2004 the Western Suburbs Magpies honoured their greatest ever players by naming their Team of the Century. Dimond was named on the wing. In 2008 the Western Suburbs Magpies celebrated their centenary by inducting six inaugural members into the club's Hall of Fame. These six included Dimond.

In 2010 Dimond was named in a South Newcastle Team of the century.
