= Bob Bennett (rugby league) =

Australian former RL coach and rugby league footballer

Personal information
- Born: Australia

Playing information
- Position: Five-eighth
Club
Years	Team	Pld	T	G	FG	P
1979	Past Brothers	1	0	1	0	2

Coaching information
Representative
Years	Team	Gms	W	D	L	W%
1996–05	Papua New Guinea	4	3	0	1	75
2005	PNG PM's XIII	1	0	0	1	0
- Source: RLP
- Relatives: Wayne Bennett (brother); Eddie Brosnan (uncle)

Bob Bennett MBE is a former rugby league footballer, Administrator and coach who played professionally for Past Brothers in the Brisbane Rugby League, along with Collegians and the Warwick Cowboys in the Toowoomba Rugby League. He also coached the Lae Bombers in 1995 as well as Papua New Guinea at the 2000 World Cup.

His brother, Wayne, has coached Australia and Queensland as well as several National Rugby League clubs.

== Early years ==
Bennett grew up in a working-class family in nearby Warwick with an alcoholic father who deserted the family. He has two sisters, Michelle and Gretta and a brother, Wayne.

== Playing career ==
Bennett played every position from fullback to front-row during his career and spent 1974 to 1981 with Past Brothers in the Brisbane Rugby League. In 1979, he represented the Queensland Police's rugby league team. In 1981, he moved to Warwick and captain-coached the Collegians club's A-grade side to three constitutive premierships in 1982, 1983 and 1984.

== Coaching career ==
Bennett was, like his brother, involved with the Queensland Police and during the 1980s he coached the Police's Toowoomba Clydsdales side to a State Championship. He later became the first coach of the Australian Police Rugby League.

Bennett was appointed the coach of the Papua New Guinea side in 1996 and led them to the 2000 World Cup. He remained with the side until 2006 when he was replaced by his former captain, Adrian Lam. Bennett became the Kumuls manager and served in this position at the 2008 World Cup.

== Later years ==
Bennett worked as a detective on the Gold Coast for the Queensland Police. After leaving the police, he worked as the manager of safety and security at Treasury Casino in Brisbane.

At the Legislative Assembly of Queensland 2006 elections, Bennett stood for the Queensland National Party in the Southport electorate. The seat was a safe Labor one and was retained by the incumbent Peter Lawlor.

In 2010, Bennett was appointed as the first CEO of the Men of League Foundation. He now works at Toowoomba Grammar School as a housemaster.

Bennett was and had an integral part in completing the required paperwork behind the scenes in having the Western Clydesdales, Formerly the Toowoomba Clydesdales back into the Intrust Super Cup (QLD CUP) in 2023.
