= Aimee Horne =

Australian actress and singer (born 1985)

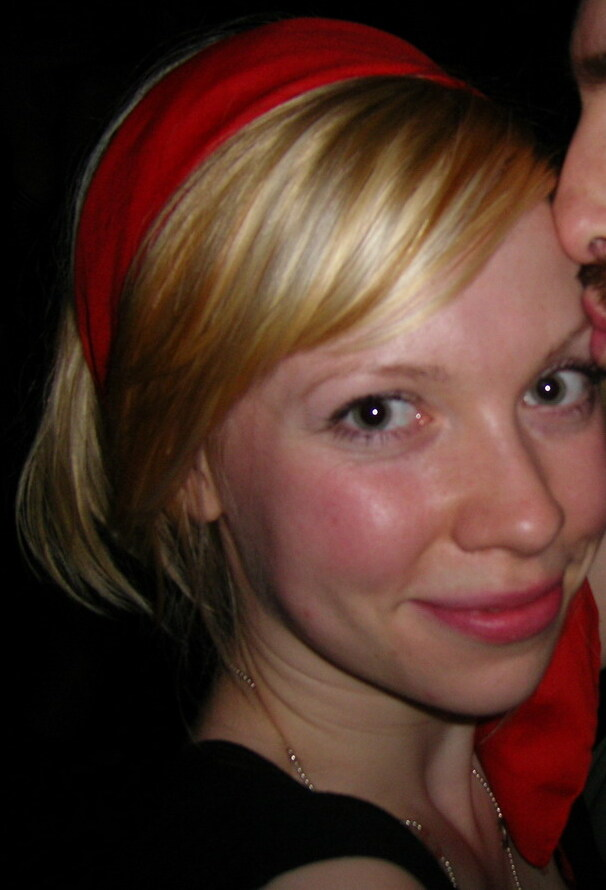
- Horne in 2006
- Born: Aimée Rene Horne; 11 May 1985 (age 41); Broken Hill, New South Wales, Australia
- Occupations: Voice-over artist, actress, singer
- Years active: 2003–present
- Website: https://www.rmk.com.au/voices/voices/aimee_horne/

Aimée Rene Horne (born 11 May 1985) is an Australian actress and singer. She has worked in film, theatre, radio and television and is an established voice-over artist. She is a graduate of the National Institute of Dramatic Art (NIDA).

== Biography ==
Horne is best known for an epic seven month Australian tour of 'Fawlty Towers Live' playing 'Polly', directed by John Cleese and CJay Ranger.

Horne has starred in productions for the Sydney Theatre Company (STC), Griffin Theatre and the ABC, as well as touring nationally for Company B (Belvoir) and Arts Radar. Aimee received a Sydney Theatre Award nomination for her role in the Tamarama Rock Surfers (TRS) production of The Highway Crossing.

Horne has receive great critical acclaim, such as "the standout was definitely Aimee Horne as the Client, delivering a blistering performance that seemed just as intense in seething silence as when mid-monologue" from Jack Teiwes in 2008 for her performance in the stage play In the Solitude of Cotton Fields.

== Film and stage ==
Title	Type	Role(s)	Director/Production	Release
Yuri Shima	short film	Street Punk	Jack Sheridan / SAFC	2005
Birth	short film	singer (soundtrack recording)	Paul Leeming / The Sydney Film School	2006
Body of Water	stage play	Wren	Jason Bridgeman / NIDA	2006
The Love Talker	stage play	Bun	Shannon Murphy / NIDA	2007
I Was A Teenage Butterfly	animated TV pilot	singer (soundtrack recording)	Eddie White / The People's Republic of Animation (PRA)	2008
Gallipoli	stage play	wife, soldier, prostitute	Nigel Jamieson / Sydney Theatre Company	2008
In The Solitude of Cottonfields	stage play	The Client	Morgan Dowsett / Theatre Forward	2008
East West 101 – Series Two	TV series	Eleni (Craig's girlfriend)	Peter Andrikidis / SBS	2009
Julius Caesar	Theatre	Decius Trebonius	Cry Havoc	2009
Double Take	Television	Ensemble cast	Channel 7	2009
Like a Fishbone	Theatre	Architects Intern	Sydney Theatre Company	2010
Quack!	Theatre	Rodney & Fanny	Griffin Theatre Company	2010
S-27	Theatre	May	Griffin Theatre Company	2010
A Midsummer Nights Dream	Theatre	Titania and Hipolyta	Company B	2011
My Bicycle Loves You	Theatre	Mimi	Legs on the Wall	2011
Recipe for Murder	Film	Yvonne Fletcher	ABC	2011
Swamplands	Theatre		Playwriting Australia	2011
The Burning Man	Film	Ms. Woodcock	Paramount Pictures	2011
Alphabet Of Arousal (Rough Draft)	Theatre		Sydney Theatre Company	2013
The Highway Crossing	Theatre	Laura	Hobo Collective in association with Tamarama Rock Surfers	2013/14
Love is Now	Film	Concierge	Eponine Films	2014
The Bleeding Tree	Theatre	Girl A	Playwriting Australia	2014
Winter	TV series	Alison	Cornerstone	2015
Fawlty Towers Live	theatre	Polly Shearman	Cjay Ranger and John Cleese	2016–2017
24 Hour Project Generator	Theatre	Collaborator	Griffin Theatre Company	
Bloodwood (Rough Draft)	Theatre		Company B	
