= Wayne Bennett (rugby league) =

Australian rugby league coach and former footballer

Wayne Bennett AM
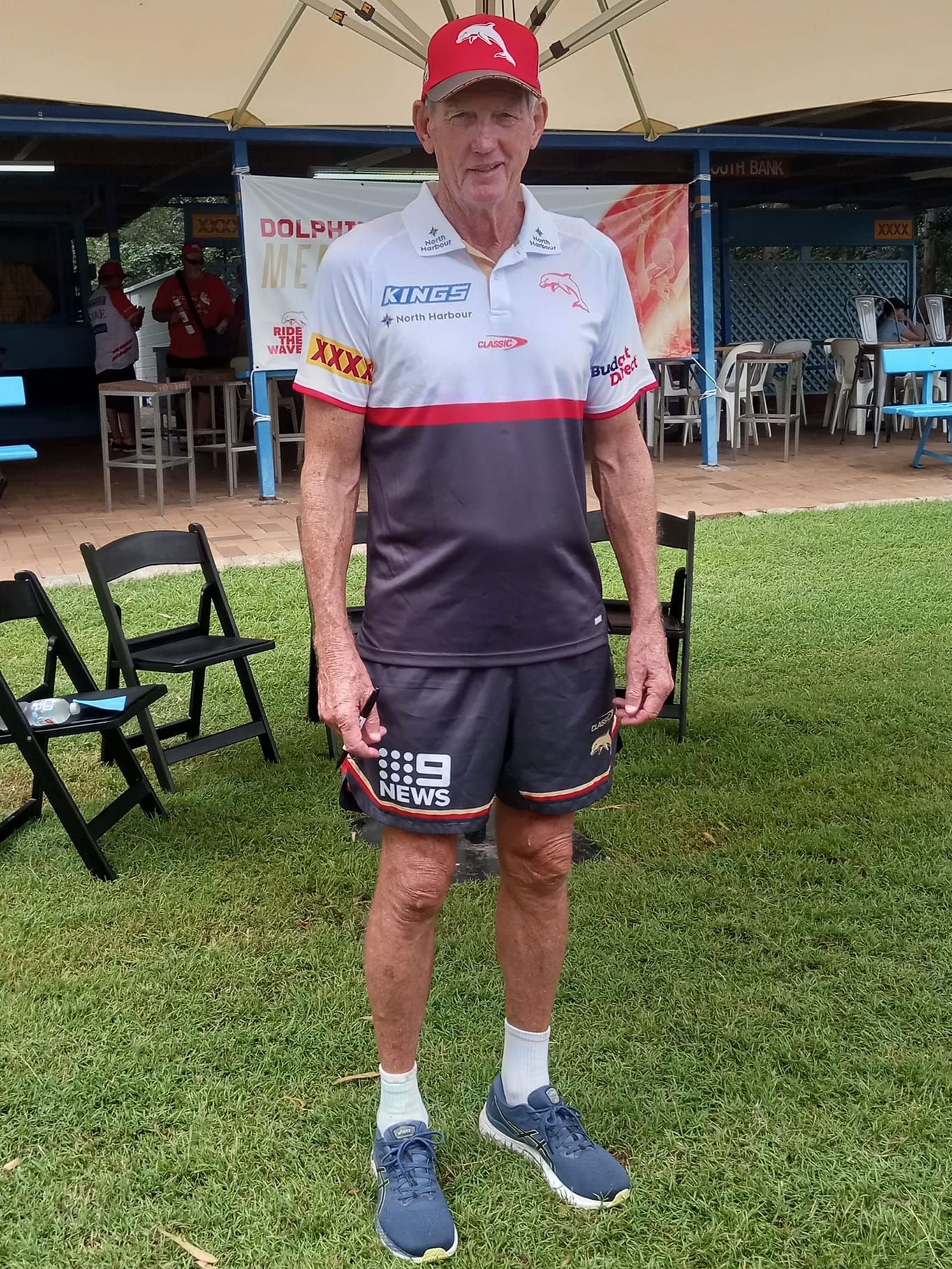

Personal information
- Full name: Wayne James Bennett
- Born: 1 January 1950 (age 76) Allora, Queensland, Australia
- Height: 191 cm (6 ft 3 in)

Playing information
- Position: Wing, Fullback
Club
| Years | Team | Pld | T | G | FG | P |
|---|---|---|---|---|---|---|
| 1972–73 | Huddersfield |
| 1974–75 | Past Brothers |
| 1977 | Southern Suburbs | 13 | 2 | 0 | 0 | 6 |
| | Total | 13 | 2 | 0 | 0 | 6 |
Representative
| Years | Team | Pld | T | G | FG | P |
| 1971–74 | Brisbane | 3 | 1 | 0 | 0 | 3 |
| 1971–73 | Queensland | 7 | 2 | 1 | 0 | 8 |
| 1971–72 | Australia | 2 | 0 | 0 | 0 | 0 |

Coaching information
Club
| Years | Team | Gms | W | D | L | W% |
| 1977–79 | Southern Suburbs | 66 | 31 | 0 | 34 | 47 |
| 1980–82 | Past Brothers | 57 | 23 | 2 | 31 | 40 |
| 1984–85 | Southern Suburbs | 47 | 32 | 1 | 12 | 68 |
| 1987 | Canberra Raiders | 28 | 17 | 0 | 11 | 61 |
| 1988–08 | Brisbane Broncos | 526 | 335 | 12 | 179 | 64 |
| 2009–11 | St. George Illawarra | 79 | 51 | 1 | 27 | 65 |
| 2012–14 | Newcastle Knights | 75 | 34 | 1 | 40 | 45 |
| 2015–18 | Brisbane Broncos | 105 | 67 | 0 | 38 | 64 |
| 2019–21 | South Sydney | 77 | 53 | 0 | 24 | 69 |
| 2023–24 | Dolphins | 48 | 20 | 0 | 28 | 42 |
| 2025– | South Sydney | 49 | 23 | 0 | 26 | 47 |
| | Total | 1157 | 686 | 17 | 450 | 59 |
Representative
| Years | Team | Gms | W | D | L | W% |
| 1986–88 | Queensland | 10 | 5 | 0 | 5 | 50 |
| 1997 | Queensland (SL) | 3 | 1 | 0 | 2 | 33 |
| 1998 | Queensland | 3 | 2 | 0 | 1 | 67 |
| 1998 | Australia | 2 | 2 | 0 | 0 | 100 |
| 2001–03 | Queensland | 9 | 4 | 1 | 4 | 44 |
| 2004–05 | Australia | 15 | 11 | 1 | 3 | 73 |
| 2007 | New Zealand All Golds | 1 | 1 | 0 | 0 | 100 |
| 2010–15 | NRL All Stars | 5 | 2 | 0 | 3 | 40 |
| 2016 | World All Stars | 1 | 1 | 0 | 0 | 100 |
| 2016–18 | England | 16 | 11 | 0 | 5 | 69 |
| 2019 | Great Britain | 4 | 0 | 0 | 4 | 0 |
| 2020 | Queensland | 3 | 2 | 0 | 1 | 67 |
- Source: As of 12 September 2026
- Relatives: Bob Bennett (brother); Ben Ikin (son-in-law); Greg Veivers (brother-in-law); Phil Veivers (brother-in-law)

Wayne James Bennett AM (born 1 January 1950) is an Australian professional rugby league football coach who is the head coach of the South Sydney Rabbitohs in the NRL and a former rugby league footballer. He is widely regarded as one of the greatest coaches of all time. Bennett has previously coached the Dolphins, the South Sydney Rabbitohs, the Brisbane Broncos, the Newcastle Knights, the St George Illawarra Dragons, the Canberra Raiders, the Queensland Maroons State of Origin team, the NRL All Stars and the Australian Kangaroos national team as well as the England and Great Britain national teams.

Widely regarded as one of the sport's greatest ever coaches, Bennett holds the Australian rugby league coaching record for the most grand final wins, winning seven premierships from ten grand final appearances in the NRL and its predecessors the Super League and New South Wales Rugby League, plus one premiership in the Brisbane Rugby League with Southern Suburbs in 1985. Bennett's twenty-four seasons with the Brisbane Broncos is a joint record for the most at a single club, shared with Craig Bellamy's stint at the Melbourne Storm. Bennett also holds the records for most games coached at a single club (631 with the Broncos), most games won as coach, and most games coached, being recognised by the NRL in Round 10 of the 2023 season as having coached 900 games in the competition and its predecessors.

Additionally, he was a coaching adviser to the Tonga national rugby league team in 2022 and the assistant head coach of New Zealand in 2008.

As a player, Bennett was an Australian international and Queensland interstate representative fullback or wing in the 1970s. He also played at club level with the Huddersfield Giants in England. Before becoming a full-time football coach in 1976, Bennett worked as a Queensland Police officer.

== Early life ==
Bennett was born in the small township of Allora, Queensland, Australia. He grew up in a working-class family in nearby Warwick with an alcoholic father who deserted the family when Wayne was eleven years old, resulting in him entering the workforce at an early age. He has two sisters, Michelle and Gretta and two brothers, Robert and Dwight. Bennett is an avowed non-smoker, non-drinker and non-gambler. Before becoming involved with the Queensland Rugby League on a full-time basis, Bennett commenced work as a police officer at age fifteen while playing junior rugby league in Warwick. His family had ties to the police and rugby league in South East Queensland through his uncle, 1948 Kangaroo forward Eddie Brosnan.

== Playing career (1970–1974) ==
Bennett's playing career began with appearances for Warwick and Toowoomba in the South-West District Rugby League, and the All Whites in the Ipswich Rugby League. His first-grade appearances were for Past Brothers and Southern Suburbs in the Brisbane Rugby League premiership (BRL). He was a talented wing and goal-kicker, and represented Queensland nine times between 1971 and 1973, including seven games against New South Wales. Coached by Bob Bax, Bennett credits him as being a major influence in his own later coaching career. Bennett also played two tour matches for Australia on the 1971 tour of New Zealand. In 1972, Bennett played for Toowoomba in the last Bulimba Cup Final against Brisbane. After that, he played for Huddersfield in England alongside fellow Queenslander and future brother-in-law Greg Veivers. Bennett played for Brisbane's Brothers club and under coach Paul Broughton reached the 1974 Grand Final which they lost to Fortitude Valley. Bennett was the top tryscorer in the 1975 Brisbane Rugby League season.

Bennett also played fullback for Brisbane Firsts, scoring a try in their 20–15 win over the touring Great Britain team in 1974 played in front of 7,880 fans at the Brisbane Showgrounds.

== Coaching career (1976–present) ==
=== Early years (1976–1985) ===
From 1975 to 1977, Bennett coached the U18s Queensland Police Academy in the Brisbane local competition and the Police Academy Cadet Team versus the NSW Police Academy.

In 1976, he began full-time coaching in Ipswich, coaching three games for the midweek Amco and Carlton Cups, before moving to Brisbane Rugby League Premiership sides, Souths (who he captain-coached in 1977) and Brothers.

After the births of his three children, Bennett had a break from coaching. He returned in 1983 as coach of Souths Acacia Ridge under 16s as well as the Queensland Police Academy under 18s team which he took to a premiership. He also worked as the Police Academy's fitness instructor. Bennett then took over the Souths job and took them to the 1984 grand final, which they lost to the Wynnum-Manly Seagulls. Revenge was to come a year later when the Bennett-coached Magpies defeated the Seagulls 10–8 in the BRL grand final to take the premiership. This was against a Seagulls line-up featuring Australian captain Wally Lewis and centre Gene Miles, both of whom would later captain the Brisbane Broncos under Bennett.

=== Queensland Maroons (1986–1988) ===
In 1986, Bennett took over from Des Morris as coach of the Queensland State of Origin team. The Maroons were beaten 3–0 in a series whitewash that year; however, Bennett was retained as Queensland's coach for two more years.

=== Canberra Raiders (1987) ===
In 1987, Bennett moved interstate to join the NSWRL's Winfield Cup Premiership when he was appointed co-coach of the Canberra Raiders alongside then Australian team coach Don Furner. With the Queensland side, Bennett won the 1987 State of Origin series. By the end of the 1987 NSWRL season, he and Furner had guided the Raiders to their first Grand Final which was lost to the Manly-Warringah Sea Eagles 18–8.

=== Brisbane Broncos (1988–2008) ===
Bennett was appointed to be the first coach of the Brisbane Broncos when the club was formed in 1988. That season with the Maroons, he defeated New South Wales in a 3 nil whitewash in the State of Origin, but Bennett discontinued his representative coaching to focus on the Broncos.

Bennett's reputation for being able to make tough and even unpopular decisions was characterised by his sacking of Wally Lewis as club captain in 1990. At the end of the season, Lewis was not made an offer large enough to retain him, with Bennett citing salary cap restrictions and the need to keep Sydney clubs away from more junior talent coming through. The Broncos won their first premierships in 1992 under Bennett. In the weeks following the grand final, Bennett travelled with the Broncos to England, where they played the 1992 World Club Challenge against British champions Wigan, helping Brisbane become the first NSWRL club to win the match in Britain. The following season, the Broncos again won the grand final, gaining a second consecutive premiership. During the 1994 QLDRL season, Bennett coached defending premiers Brisbane when they unsuccessfully hosted British champions Wigan for the 1994 World Club Challenge.

Bennett was appointed as Queensland coach again for the 1995 State of Origin series but pulled out of the position after players aligned with the breakaway Super League organisation (including the majority of his club team, the Brisbane Broncos) were refused selection. In the 1997 Super League season, the Broncos dominated under Bennett, winning the 1997 World Club Championship as well as the Telstra Cup grand final in Brisbane. Bennett resumed representative coaching duties in 1998 with Queensland and was also given the honour of coaching Australia when he was appointed to replace Bob Fulton as Kangaroos coach. Australia was undefeated in two test matches against New Zealand. Bennett won his fourth premiership with the Broncos when they took the 1998 NRL grand final, and he was also named Coach of the Year at the Queensland Sport Awards. Bennett ceased coaching the Australian national team in March 1999, and was replaced by Chris Anderson.

In 2000, Bennett won his fifth premiership with the Broncos. Following the premiership win, the Australian Rugby Union tried to poach Bennett, but he declined. Having won the 2000 NRL Premiership, the Broncos travelled to England to play against 2000's Super League V Champions, St Helens R.F.C. for the 2001 World Club Challenge, with Bennett overseeing Brisbane's loss. Bennett would again coach Queensland in 2001, gaining widespread attention after his decision to recall Allan Langer to the Maroons from the Super League for the deciding third game of the 2001 State of Origin series. Bennett remained Queensland's coach for the 2002 and 2003 series before stepping down again. He continued his involvement with coaching for Queensland through the Queensland Academy of Sport and in an off-field role with the Queensland Rugby League. On Australia Day 2004, Bennett was honoured as a member of the Order of Australia "for service to rugby league football, particularly as a coach, and to the community."

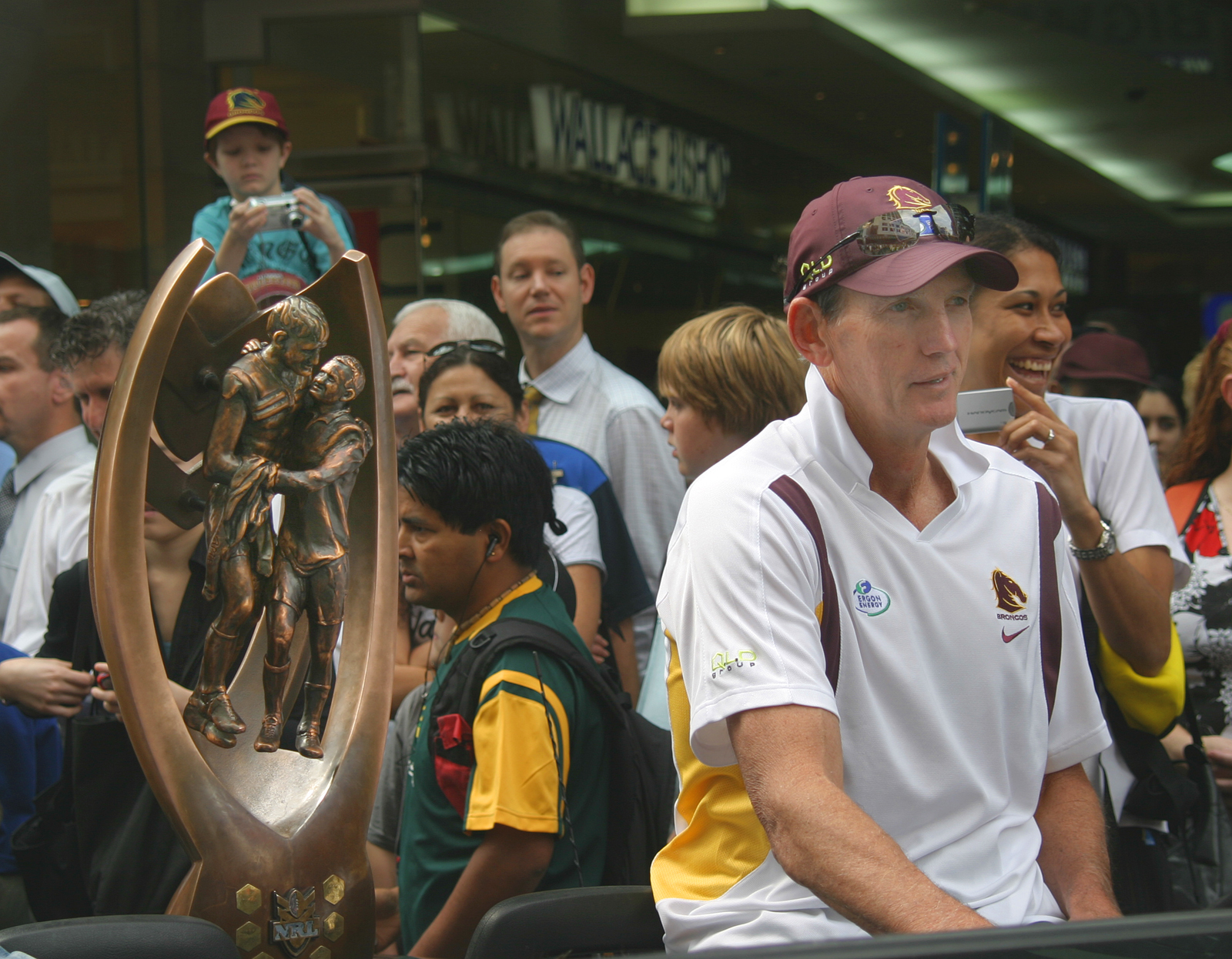
Bennett with the Telstra Premiership trophy at post 2006 NRL Grand Final celebrations in Brisbane.

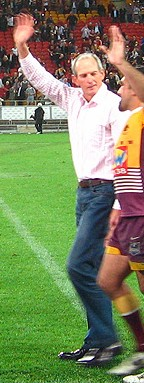
Bennett and Tonie Carroll at Suncorp Stadium in 2008

Bennett is a passionate advocate of international Rugby League and was instrumental in the revival of the Tri-Nations series in 2004. In that year, he was again appointed Australian coach and took Australia to reclaim the Trans-Tasman Trophy (lost to New Zealand in 2003) and win the second Rugby League Tri-Nations Series. At the end of the 2005 season, after five successive years without a grand final appearance, Bennett decided to have a clean-out of the coaching staff, removing such long-time allies as Gary Belcher, Glenn Lazarus and Kevin Walters.

That year, he received the Rugby League International Federation's coach of the year award. However, on 9 December 2005, it was announced that Bennett had resigned as Australia's coach after the Kangaroos lost an international series for the first time in 27 years, and equalled their biggest loss in 98 years, going down 24–0 to New Zealand in the final of the 2005 Tri-nations series. In 2006 a secret deal being brokered between Bennett and the Sydney Roosters club for him to become their coach was made public. This is said to have caused the deterioration in his relationship with the Broncos management which eventually led to his resignation. During the 2006 finals series, Bennett became the second person (after Tim Sheens) to coach 500 premiership games. He also signed on to continue coaching the Broncos for a further two years. The sixth premiership final won by Brisbane against Melbourne made Wayne Bennett the most successful Grand Final coach in history. He again was named Queensland's Sport Coach of the Year for 2007 and was made a life member of the Broncos club. His refusal to make an acceptance speech at the club's presentation ball showed the strain in his relationship with the Broncos. Bennett coached the 2007 All Golds. In doing so, he introduced the New Zealand players to the Queen and the Duke of Edinburgh.

Bennett was originally contracted to the Broncos until the end of 2009, but on the night of 4 February 2008 at a Broncos board meeting, he submitted his letter of resignation and sought an early release at the end of the 2008 season. Bennett's coaching future was confirmed on 31 March 2008, when he signed a three-year contract to coach the St. George Illawarra Dragons from season 2009. After much speculation, Bennett became assistant coach and advisor to New Zealand coach Stephen Kearney in 2008. This was in preparation for the Centenary test against the Kangaroos. Bennett was retained in the same role for the 2008 Rugby League World Cup, which the Kiwis won. Former New Zealand coach Graham Lowe has credited Bennett with the victory.

=== St George Illawarra Dragons (2009–2011) ===
The Bennett era at St George Illawarra began with high turnover of staff and players. High performance director Jeremy Hickmans, conditioner Scott Campbell and manager/assistant Paul Massey were recruited to replace the existing staff, while the playing roster had recently lost high-profile stars Mark Gasnier to retirement with Jason Ryles and Josh Morris released. The club's player recruiting however was extensive: Jeremy Smith, Darius Boyd, Neville Costigan, Luke Priddis, Michael Weyman, Mathew Head (returned) and Mickey Paea. At the Dragons, Bennett was to be re-united with former Broncos Wendell Sailor and Luke Priddis, both of whom had won premierships with him at Brisbane. Neville Costigan, who also played under Bennett at the Broncos joined the Dragons that year in addition to Darius Boyd and Nick Emmett who also moved from Brisbane to St. George Illawarra at the same time as Bennett.

His first game with the Dragons was a golden point loss to the previous season's grand finalists, Melbourne Storm. In round 4 of the 2009 NRL season, Bennett returned to Suncorp Stadium with the Dragons and for the first time coached against the club he helped build. St. George Illawarra defeated the Broncos convincingly as the Dragons continued to lead the competition in defence. However, after winning the minor premiership in his first season at the club, it was the Brisbane Broncos who knocked the Dragons out of finals contention at the end of the 2009 season.

In 2009, Bennett was inducted into the Queensland Sport Hall of Fame.

In the 2010 NRL season, Bennett guided the Dragons to their second consecutive minor premiership and on to the 2010 NRL Grand Final, the joint venture club's second. After years of having a "choker" tag, they faced the Sydney Roosters at ANZ Stadium in the decider at the season's end. The rain fell across the ground during the match and Bennett's players had a fiery 2nd Half after a traditional spray at half time as they were being led 8–6 at the break. The Dragons under Bennett were successful in winning their first premiership as a joint venture who went on to beat the Roosters 32–8.

The Dragons went on to defeat 2010's Super League XV champions, Wigan Warriors in the 2011 World Club Challenge, but Bennett was absent, choosing to fly back to Australia days before the match to be with his ill mother-in-law, and leaving assistant coach Steve Price in charge.

On 30 March 2011, Bennett announced he would not continue on as coach of St George Illawarra beyond the 2011 season. His final game at the helm of St. George Illawarra ended the way it started, with a heartbreaking golden point loss against his old club, the Brisbane Broncos, at Suncorp Stadium. This extended Bennett's winless finals record at the venue to eight.

=== Newcastle Knights (2012–2014) ===
In 2012, Bennett commenced a four-year contract with the Newcastle Knights. The team did not reach the finals that year; the first finals series not to feature Bennett in twenty-one years. This changed in the following season when he took the club to within one match of the 2013 NRL Grand Final.

Due to a change in club ownership in 2014, Bennett became a free agent and announced that he would be leaving the club at the end of the season to return to the Brisbane Broncos ahead of the 2015 season.

=== Brisbane Broncos (2015–2018) ===
Bennett returned to coach the Brisbane Broncos for the 2015 NRL season, The Broncos subsequently finished second in the regular season and made it to the grand final, but were defeated 17-16 by the North Queensland Cowboys in golden point extra time, which was the Broncos first grand final defeat. Bennett continued with the Broncos until the end of the 2018 season.

On 2 December 2018, Bennett was officially sacked as coach of the Brisbane Broncos following a bitter dispute with club officials. He then signed up to coach the South Sydney Rabbitohs for the 2019 season onwards. On 4 December 2018, Bennett spoke to the media about his sacking saying "You don't get the chance to say goodbye to anybody when they sack you and they tell you not to come back to the building", Bennett said. "But that's alright. That's all fine. We'll all get over it. I was happy to be sacked. Just leave it at that. I was happy".

=== Great Britain and England (2016–2020) ===
In 2016, Bennett was appointed coach of England for two seasons. The decision however suffered criticism from some critics, such as former English internationals Kevin Sinfield and Jamie Peacock who believe previous coach Steve McNamara should have stayed at the helm, while Australian rugby league legend Wally Lewis said that an Australian should not be coaching the English team. Later in 2016, rumours came about that Bennett would be selecting Australian players such as Brett and twin brother Josh Morris as well as Trent Hodkinson in his English team for the 2016 Four Nations. However, he 'denied' that he'd select those players in his squad saying that the media is 'getting excited'. In October 2017, Bennett was selected for the England squad in the 2017 Rugby League World Cup.

In 2019, Bennett was selected as head coach for the Great Britain Lions tour of the Southern Hemisphere. He took charge of Great Britain for the first time in the defeat by Tonga. Great Britain ended the tour losing all four matches including the last match which was a humiliating 28–10 loss against Papua New Guinea in Port Moresby. Following the conclusion of the tour, several Great Britain players and Bennett himself came under intense media scrutiny and fan backlash.

He was also selected to coach the England 9s squad for the 2019 Rugby League World Cup 9s.

=== South Sydney Rabbitohs (2019–2021) ===
In 2019, Bennett started his first of three seasons as South Sydney coach with the club winning ten of their first eleven games which saw them sitting at the top of the table. Following the 2019 State of Origin series, Souths suffered a slump in form before winning their last three matches in a row to finish the regular season in 3rd place. Bennett guided South Sydney to the preliminary final against the Canberra Raiders but were defeated 16–10 at Canberra Stadium.

On 21 February 2020, it was announced that Bennett would be leaving South Sydney as head coach at the end of the 2021 season with assistant Jason Demetriou taking his place. Nevertheless, Bennett guided South Sydney to a sixth place finish in the 2020 NRL season which saw the club qualify for the finals. Bennett took South Sydney to their third preliminary final in a row where they suffered a 20–16 loss against Penrith. On 14 January 2021, it was announced that Bennett relinquished his Queensland Maroons coaching job from the previous year. In the 2021 NRL season, Bennett guided South Sydney to a third placed finish. He then took South Sydney to the 2021 NRL Grand Final which was also Bennett's tenth grand final as a head coach. South Sydney lost to Penrith 14–12.

=== Dolphins (2022–2024) ===
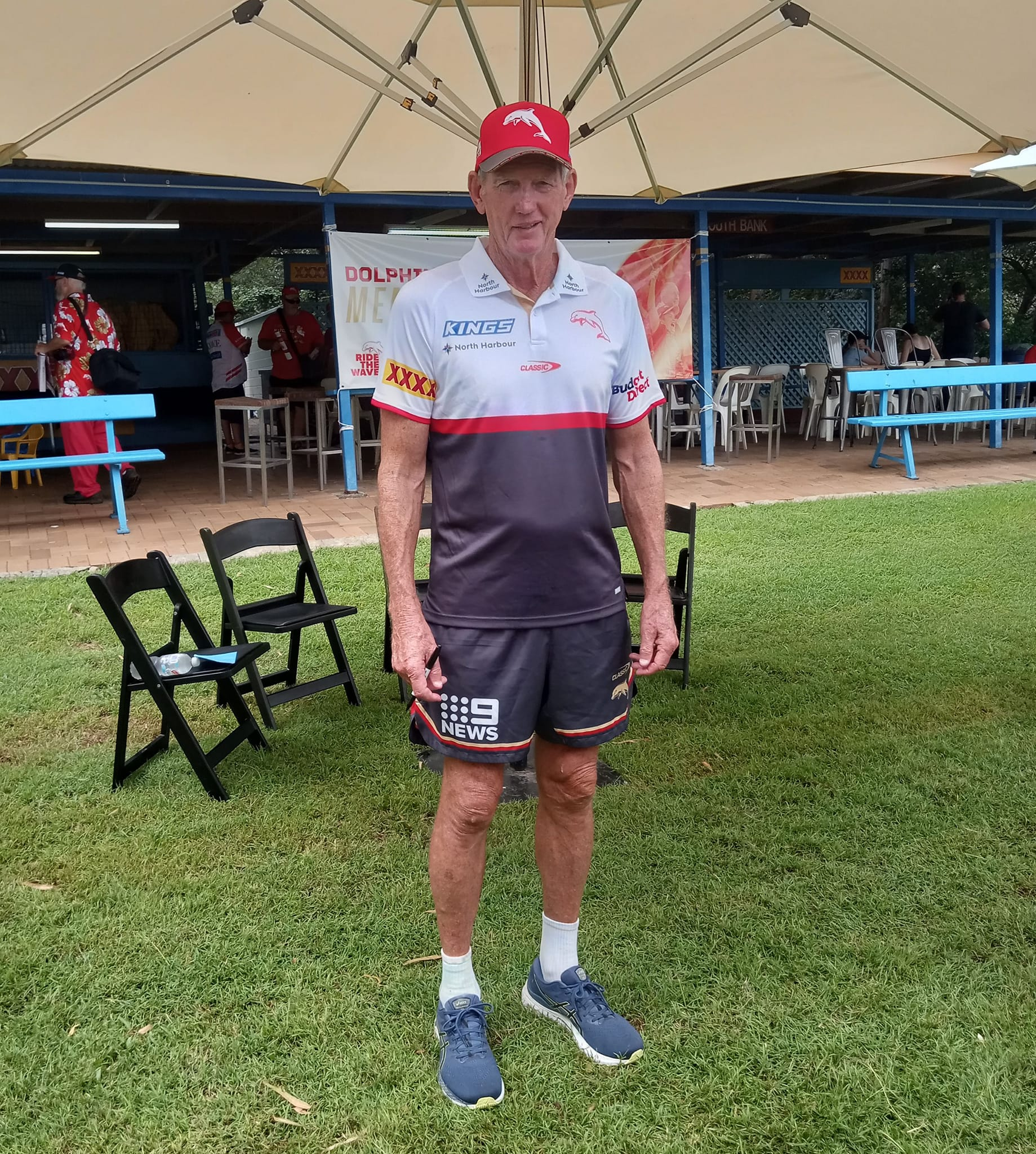
Bennett as Dolphins NRL head coach in Brisbane 2024

Commencing in 2022, Bennett joined the Dolphins as head coach for their inaugural 2023 season in the NRL competition. The Dolphins won their first three matches in 2023. In round 8, they equalled the greatest comeback in premiership history to defeat the Gold Coast Titans 28–26 at Suncorp Stadium, after trailing the Titans 26–0 after the first twenty-six minutes. The record for a winning comeback in premiership history dating to 1908 was set in 1998, when the North Queensland Cowboys went from being down 26–0 to defeating the Penrith Panthers 36–28 at full-time.

On 5 May 2023, it was reported that Bennett had coached a total of 1227 games to date, and the Dolphins' round 10 clash against the Cronulla-Sutherland Sharks on Saturday 6 May at Suncorp Stadium would be his 900th premiership match.

The Dolphins finished thirteenth out of seventeen teams in their inaugural NRL season (2023) and tenth in 2024.

=== South Sydney Rabbitohs (2025–2028) ===
On 21 May 2024, Bennett signed a three-year deal to re-join South Sydney in 2025. It was also reported that Bennett had been approached by Parramatta to become their new head coach, however Bennett stated he had unfinished business at South Sydney saying "I like the people there and I like the club and what it stands for". In the 2025 NRL season, South Sydney suffered a heavy injury toll during the year which affected their results on the field. Bennett would eventually guide South Sydney to a 14th placed finish on the table. At one stage, the club were sitting last on the table but managed to win three of their last four games. In the 2026 NRL season, Bennett guided Souths back to the finals with a 6th placed finish on the table. The club were eliminated from the finals in the first week after suffering a shock loss to Newcastle. On 18 November 2026, the Rabbitohs announced that they had extended Bennett's contract until the end of 2028.

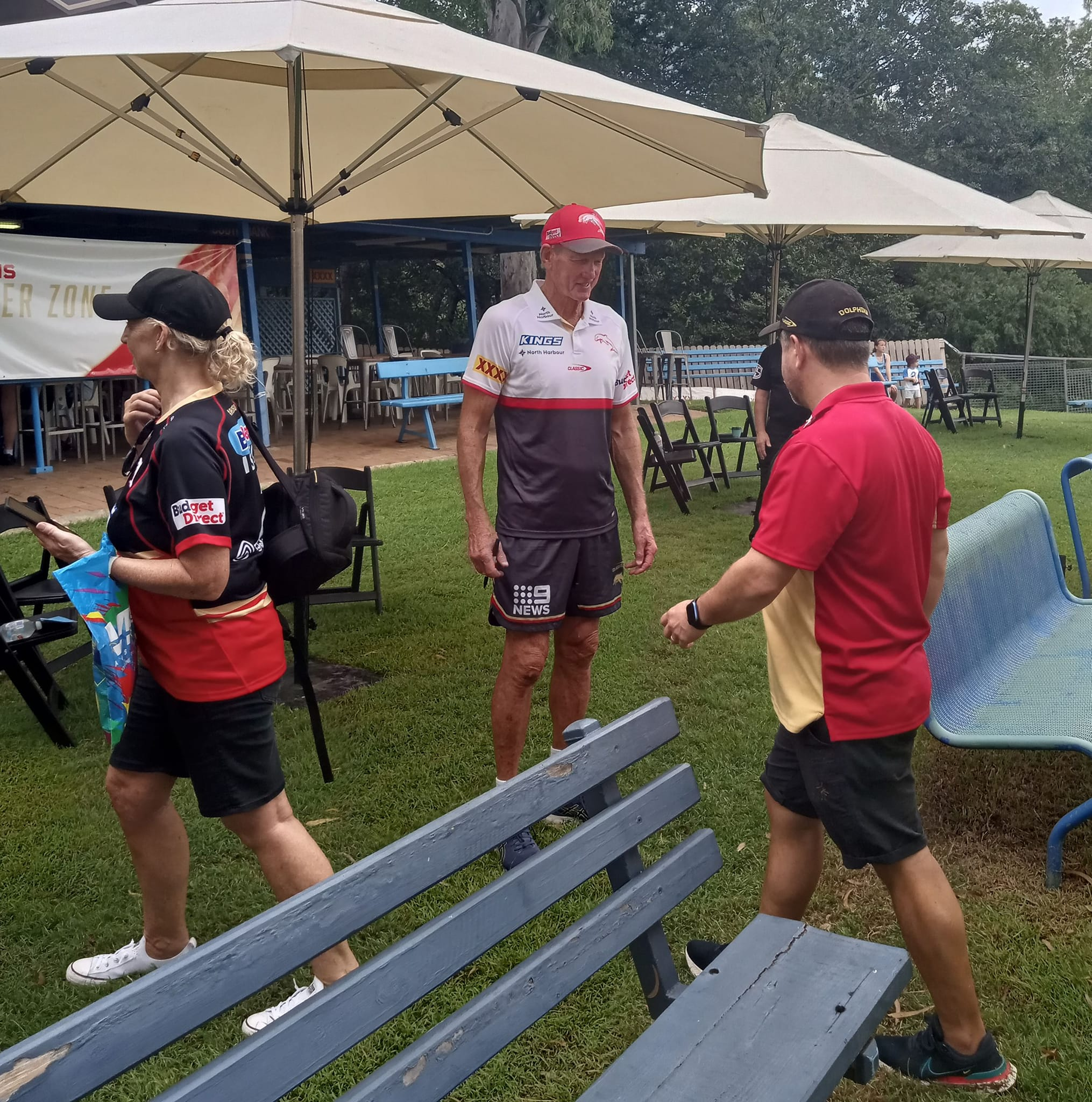
Bennett greets Dolphins NRL fans in Brisbane

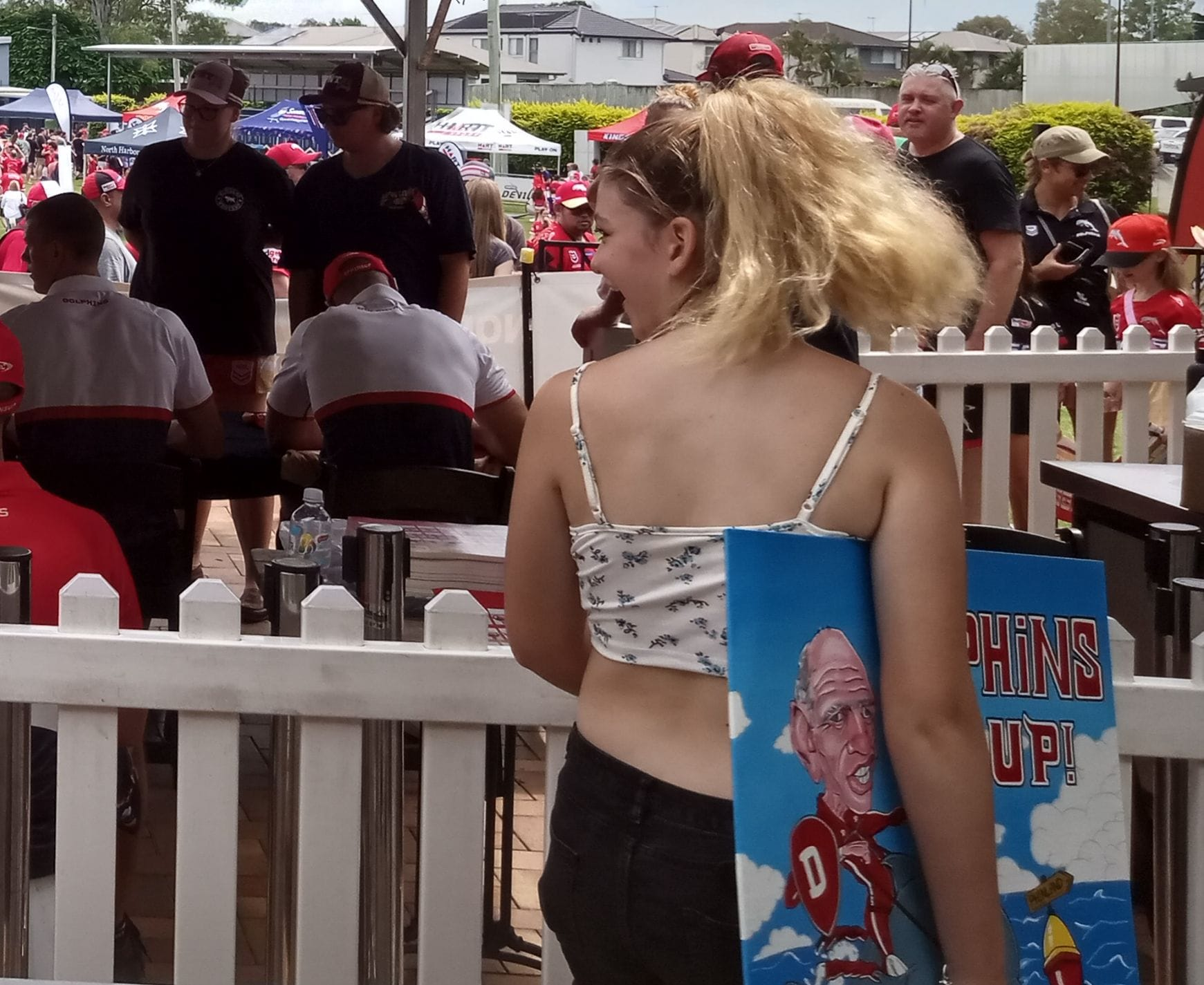
Dolphins NRL fan with Bennett caricature

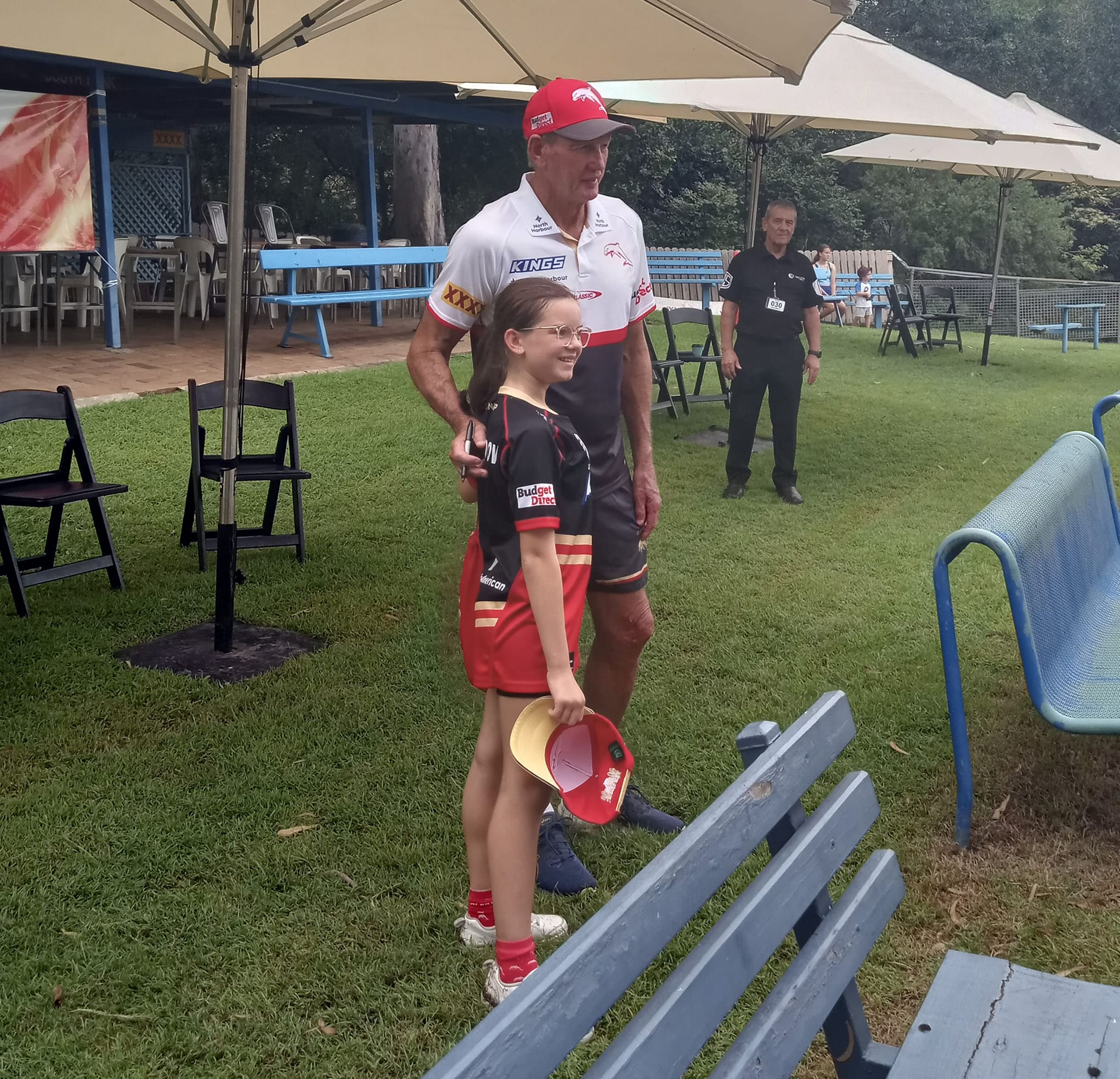
Bennett and a Dolphins fan in Brisbane 2024

== Public persona ==
Known for his taciturn manner and appearing outwardly unemotional, Bennett has stated that he detests the media commitments required as head coach of a high-profile football team. Although on occasions he will happily give in-depth interviews, he has also exhibited hostility towards the press, avoided questions and started press conferences early.

== Personal life ==
Bennett married Trish Veivers (a sister of Greg Veivers) in 1974, and they subsequently had three children. The couple separated in 2016.

In 2007, Bennett co-wrote the book Don't Die with the Music in You with Australian journalist Steve Crawley. The title refers to a quote from the American intellectual Oliver Wendell Holmes Sr. regarding failure to meet one's potential. On 7 May 2008, prominent personalities such as NRL CEO David Gallop, rugby league coach Jack Gibson, businessman Lachlan Murdoch, entrepreneur John Singleton and cricketer Steve Waugh were among the attendees at the Australian Museum in Sydney when the book was publicly launched; it went on to sell over 100,000 copies. His second book with Crawley, The Man in the Mirror, was published in August 2009. Bennett has also written a weekly column in The Australian, a national newspaper.

In 2016, Bennett commenced a relationship with Dale Tynan, whom he met while coaching in Newcastle.

== Recognition ==
- 1994: Medal of the Order of Australia "in recognition of service to the sport of Rugby League, particularly as coach of the Brisbane Broncos"
- 1997: Super League Coach of the Year
- 1998: Queensland Father of the year
- 2000: NRL Coach of the Year
- 2000: Australian Sports Medal for "significant contribution to the development of sport"
- 2004: Member of the Order of Australia for "service to Rugby League football, particularly as a coach, and to the community"
- 2012: Inducted into the Sport Australia Hall of Fame
- 2015: Dally M Coach of the Year
- 2024: Inducted into the NRL Hall of Fame

== Statistics ==
=== Club ===
| † | Denotes seasons in which a club coached by Bennett won an Australian first-grade premiership |

| Season | Team | Matches | Wins | Draws | Losses | Win % | Notes |
|---|---|---|---|---|---|---|---|
| 1977 | Southern Suburbs | 21 | 7 | 0 | 14 | 33.33% | Finished 8th (out of 8). |
| 1978 | Southern Suburbs | 21 | 9 | 0 | 12 | 42.86% | Finished 5th (out of 8). |
| 1979 | Southern Suburbs | 24 | 15 | 0 | 9 | 62.50% | Finished 3rd (out of 8). Lost grand final to Fortitude Valley. |
| 1980 | Past Brothers | 22 | 14 | 0 | 8 | 63.64% | Finished 3rd (out of 8). Lost semi-final to Northern Suburbs. |
| 1981 | Past Brothers | 21 | 5 | 1 | 15 | 23.81% | Finished 8th (out of 8). |
| 1982 | Past Brothers | 14 | 4 | 1 | 9 | 28.57% | Finished 6th (out of 8). |
| 1984 | Southern Suburbs | 24 | 15 | 1 | 8 | 62.50% | Finished 2nd (out of 8). Lost grand final to Wynnum-Manly. |
| 1985† | Southern Suburbs | 23 | 17 | 0 | 6 | 73.91% | Finished 1st (out of 8). Won grand final against Wynnum-Manly. |
| 1987 | Canberra | 28 | 17 | 0 | 11 | 60.71% | Finished 3rd (out of 13). Lost grand final to Manly-Warringah. |
| 1988 | Brisbane | 22 | 14 | 0 | 8 | 63.64% | Finished 7th (out of 16). |
| 1989 | Brisbane | 23 | 14 | 0 | 9 | 60.87% | Finished 5th (out of 16). Lost Playoff to Cronulla-Sutherland. |
| 1990 | Brisbane | 25 | 17 | 1 | 7 | 68.00% | Finished 2nd (out of 16). Lost preliminary final to Canberra. |
| 1991 | Brisbane | 22 | 13 | 0 | 9 | 59.09% | Finished 7th (out of 16). |
| 1992† | Brisbane | 24 | 20 | 0 | 4 | 83.33% | Finished 1st (out of 16). Won grand final against St. George. |
| 1993† | Brisbane | 26 | 20 | 0 | 6 | 76.92% | Finished 5th (out of 16). Won grand final against St. George. |
| 1994 | Brisbane | 24 | 14 | 1 | 9 | 58.33% | Finished 5th (out of 16). Lost semi-final to North Sydney. |
| 1995 | Brisbane | 24 | 17 | 0 | 7 | 70.83% | Finished 3rd (out of 20). Lost semi-final to Sydney. |
| 1996 | Brisbane | 23 | 17 | 0 | 6 | 73.91% | Finished 2nd (out of 20). Lost semi-final to Cronulla-Sutherland. |
| 1997† | Brisbane | 20 | 16 | 1 | 3 | 80.00% | Finished 1st (out of 10). Won grand final against Cronulla-Sutherland. |
| 1998† | Brisbane | 28 | 21 | 1 | 6 | 75.00% | Finished 1st (out of 20). Won grand final against Canterbury-Bankstown. |
| 1999 | Brisbane | 25 | 13 | 2 | 10 | 52.00% | Finished 8th (out of 17). Lost Qualifying final to Cronulla-Sutherland. |
| 2000† | Brisbane | 29 | 21 | 2 | 6 | 72.41% | Finished 1st (out of 14). Won grand final against Sydney. |
| 2001 | Brisbane | 29 | 15 | 1 | 13 | 51.72% | Finished 5th (out of 14). Lost preliminary final to Parramatta. |
| 2002 | Brisbane | 24 (Note: Does not include 2 games Bennett missed due to State of Origin duties, which were instead coached by Craig Bellamy.) | 16 | 1 | 7 | 66.67% | Finished 3rd (out of 15). Lost preliminary final to Sydney. |
| 2003 | Brisbane | 25 | 12 | 0 | 13 | 48.00% | Finished 8th (out of 15). Lost elimination final to Penrith. |
| 2004 | Brisbane | 26 | 16 | 1 | 9 | 61.54% | Finished 3rd (out of 15). Lost semi-final to North Queensland. |
| 2005 | Brisbane | 26 | 15 | 0 | 11 | 57.69% | Finished 3rd (out of 15). Lost semi-final to Wests. |
| 2006† | Brisbane | 28 | 16 | 0 | 12 | 57.14% | Finished 3rd (out of 15). Won grand final against Melbourne. |
| 2007 | Brisbane | 25 | 11 | 0 | 14 | 44.00% | Finished 8th (out of 16). Lost elimination final to Melbourne. |
| 2008 | Brisbane | 26 | 15 | 1 | 10 | 57.69% | Finished 5th (out of 16). Lost semi-final to Melbourne. |
| 2009 | St. George Illawarra | 26 | 17 | 0 | 9 | 65.38% | Finished 1st (out of 16). Lost semi-final to Brisbane. |
| 2010† | St. George Illawarra | 27 | 20 | 0 | 7 | 74.07% | Finished 1st (out of 16). Won grand final against Sydney. |
| 2011 | St. George Illawarra | 26 | 14 | 1 | 11 | 53.85% | Finished 5th (out of 16). Lost semi-final to Brisbane. |
| 2012 | Newcastle | 24 | 10 | 0 | 14 | 41.67% | Finished 12th (out of 16). |
| 2013 | Newcastle | 27 | 14 | 1 | 12 | 51.85% | Finished 7th (out of 16). Lost preliminary final to Sydney. |
| 2014 | Newcastle | 24 | 10 | 0 | 14 | 41.67% | Finished 12th (out of 16). |
| 2015 | Brisbane | 27 | 19 | 0 | 8 | 70.37% | Finished 2nd (out of 16). Lost grand final to North Queensland. |
| 2016 | Brisbane | 26 | 16 | 0 | 10 | 61.54% | Finished 5th (out of 16). Lost semi-final to North Queensland. |
| 2017 | Brisbane | 27 | 17 | 0 | 10 | 62.96% | Finished 3rd (out of 16). Lost preliminary final to Melbourne. |
| 2018 | Brisbane | 25 | 15 | 0 | 10 | 60.00% | Finished 6th (out of 16). Lost elimination final to St. George Illawarra. |
| 2019 | South Sydney | 27 | 17 | 0 | 10 | 62.96% | Finished 3rd (out of 16). Lost preliminary final to Canberra. |
| 2020 | South Sydney | 23 (Note: Includes 2 games considered to have been "coached remotely", despite not being physically present due to the NRL's COVID-19 protocols.) | 14 | 0 | 9 | 60.87% | Finished 6th (out of 16). Lost preliminary final to Penrith. |
| 2021 | South Sydney | 27 | 22 | 0 | 5 | 81.48% | Finished 3rd (out of 16). Lost grand final to Penrith. |
| 2023 | Dolphins | 24 | 9 | 0 | 15 | 37.50% | Finished 13th (out of 17). |
| 2024 | Dolphins | 24 | 11 | 0 | 13 | 45.83% | Finished 10th (out of 17). |
| 2025 | South Sydney | 24 | 9 | 0 | 15 | 37.50% | Finished 14th (out of 17) |
| 2026 | South Sydney | 25 | 14 | 0 | 11 | 56.00% | Finished 6th (out of 17). Lost elimination final to Newcastle. |
| Career totals | | 1157 | 686 | 17 | 450 | 59.29% | |

=== Representative ===
| Season | Team | Matches | Wins | Draws | Losses | Win % | Notes |
|---|---|---|---|---|---|---|---|
| 1986 | Queensland | 3 | 0 | 0 | 3 | 00.00% | Lost State of Origin series to New South Wales |
| 1987 | Queensland | 4 (Note: Includes post-series match played in Long Beach, California.) | 2 | 0 | 2 | 50.00% | Won State of Origin series against New South Wales |
| 1988 | Queensland | 3 | 3 | 0 | 0 | 100.00% | Won State of Origin series against New South Wales |
| 1997 | Queensland^{SL} | 3 | 1 | 0 | 2 | 33.33% | Lost Super League Tri-series final to New South Wales |
| 1998 | Queensland | 3 | 2 | 0 | 1 | 66.67% | Won State of Origin series against New South Wales |
| 1998 | Australia | 2 | 2 | 0 | 0 | 100.00% | |
| 2001 | Queensland | 3 | 2 | 0 | 1 | 66.67% | Won State of Origin series against New South Wales |
| 2002 | Queensland | 3 | 1 | 1 | 1 | 33.33% | Drew State of Origin series with New South Wales |
| 2003 | Queensland | 3 | 1 | 0 | 2 | 33.33% | Lost State of Origin series to New South Wales |
| 2004 | Australia | 8 | 6 | 1 | 1 | 75.00% | Won Tri-Nations final against Great Britain |
| 2005 | Australia | 7 | 5 | 0 | 2 | 71.43% | Lost Tri-Nations final to New Zealand |
| 2007 | New Zealand All Golds | 1 | 1 | 0 | 0 | 100.00% | |
| 2010 | NRL All Stars | 1 | 0 | 0 | 1 | 00.00% | |
| 2011 | NRL All Stars | 1 | 1 | 0 | 0 | 100.00% | |
| 2012 | NRL All Stars | 1 | 1 | 0 | 0 | 100.00% | |
| 2013 | NRL All Stars | 1 | 0 | 0 | 1 | 00.00% | |
| 2015 | NRL All Stars | 1 | 0 | 0 | 1 | 00.00% | |
| 2016 | World All Stars | 1 | 1 | 0 | 0 | 100.00% | |
| 2016 | England | 4 | 2 | 0 | 2 | 50.00% | Lost Four Nations (eliminated in group stage). |
| 2017 | England | 7 | 5 | 0 | 2 | 71.43% | Lost World Cup final to Australia |
| 2018 | England | 5 | 4 | 0 | 1 | 80.00% | |
| 2019 | Great Britain | 4 | 0 | 0 | 4 | 00.00% | |
| 2020 | Queensland | 3 | 2 | 0 | 1 | 66.67% | Won State of Origin series against New South Wales |
| Career totals | | 72 | 41 | 2 | 29 | 56.94% | |

== Notes ==
Sporting positions
| Preceded by None | Coach Dolphins; 2023–2024 | Succeeded by Kristian Woolf |
