= Pat McMahon (rugby league) =

Personal information
- Full name: Patrick McMahon
- Born: 21 June 1927
- Died: 25 November 2013 (aged 86)

Playing information
- Position: Wing
Club
Years	Team	Pld	T	G	FG	P
	Mt. Isa
	All Whites
	Babinda
	Total	0	0	0	0	0
Representative
Years	Team	Pld	T	G	FG	P
1946–51	Queensland	15
1948–49	Australia	9	5	0	0	15

Patrick McMahon (21 June 1927 – 25 November 2013), also known by the nickname of "Cocky", was an Australian professional rugby league footballer who played in the 1940s and 1950s. An Australia national and Queensland state representative winger, he played his club football around the state of Queensland.

McMahon was first selected to represent Queensland in 1946. The following year he joined Toowoomba's Souths club and while there he was selected in 1948 to make his international début for the Australian national team, becoming Kangaroo No. 241.

During his career McMahon also played for Mt. Isa, Toowoomba's All Whites club, and Babinda.

McMahon also had a stint as captain coach of the Mitchell club in 1956.

In 2008, rugby league in Australia's centenary year, McMahon was named on the bench of the Toowoomba and South West Team of the Century.
