= Bobby Dimond =

Australia international rugby league footballer (1930–2020)

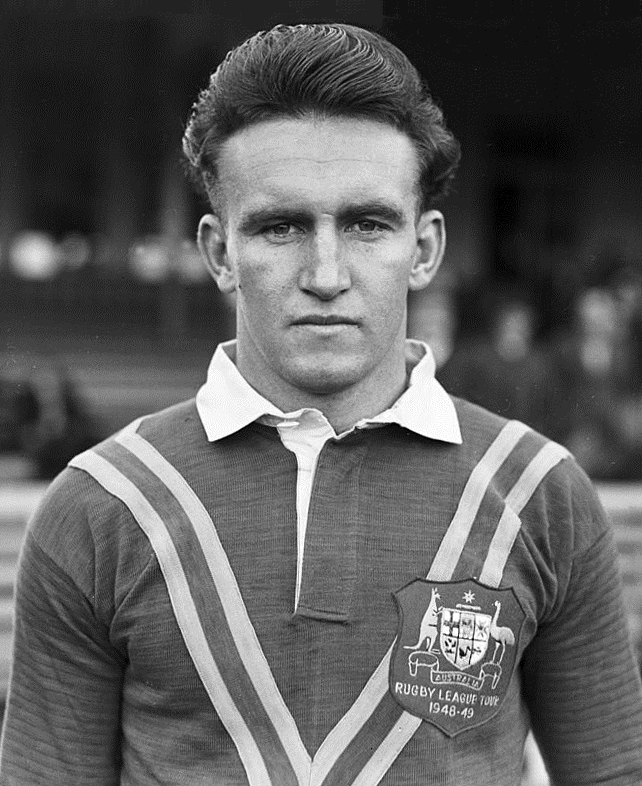
- Bobby Dimond in 1948

Personal information
- Full name: Robert Henry Dimond
- Born: 4 November 1929 Dapto, New South Wales, Australia
- Died: 30 May 2020 (aged 90)

Playing information
- Position: Wing
Club
Years	Team	Pld	T	G	FG	P
1950–51	Western Suburbs	23	12	0	0	36
Representative
Years	Team	Pld	T	G	FG	P
1948	New South Wales	3	1	0	0	3
1948–49	Australia	24	0	0	0	0
1948–49	NSW Country	3	0	0	0	0
- Relatives: Craig Dimond (nephew); Peter Dimond (brother)

Robert Henry Dimond (4 Nov 1929 – 30 May 2020) was an Australian rugby league footballer who played in the 1940s and 1950s. He was selected to play for Australia and was a member of the 1948 Kangaroo Tour. He played 20 matches on the tour and scored ten tries, but did not play in a test match. He died due to prolonged illness.

== Playing career ==
Born in Dapto, New South Wales, he is the older brother of Peter Dimond. He made his first grade debut at the age of sixteen. He played in the NSWRFL Premiership for Western Suburbs in seasons 1951 and 1952. He retired from Sydney football in 1953.

Back in 1948, an 18 year old youth, Bobby Dimond, was playing centre for Dapto First Grade team. In the space of a few short weeks, however, he had become famous on the strength of half a dozen sterling performances in first class League company.

He came into the spotlight in the Combined Country v Sydney match on the Sydney Cricket Ground in that season (1948). Bobby, who gained a last minute inclusion in the Country side on the wing, had as his vis-a-vis, Sydney's outstanding winger, Bob Lulham. So effectively did Dimond tackle throughout the game that Lulham was unable to score, and at the termination of the match, Lulham congratulated Bob Dimond on his grand display. This same season (1948) Bobby twice represented NSW v Queensland, played in the Combined Country v Kiwis on Wollongong Showground and in the return match for Combined Country v Combined Sydney. After his grand displays in these games, Bob was selected to tour England and France with the Kangaroos, being the youngest player ever to gain this high honor.

Upon his return from abroad in 1949, Bobby gained representation in the Combined Country's First team v Combined Sydney and v Queensland on the Wollongong Showground. In 1950 he joined Western Suburbs (Sydney) and represented NSW v Great Britain. He also played for Wests in 1951 but, because of injuries sustained in an accident, he was out of the game for two seasons. Whilst playing here and on other playing fields Bobby acquitted himself well. Besides being a resolute runner when in possession, he proved himself a dour defender. In fact his defense was his main attribute.
