= Bruce Hopkins (rugby league) =

Australian rugby league footballer

Personal information
- Full name: Colin Bruce Hopkins
- Born: 6 December 1924; Sydney, New South Wales
- Died: 26 December 2013 (aged 89); Coffs Harbour, New South Wales

Playing information
- Position: Halfback
Club
Years	Team	Pld	T	G	FG	P
1947–49	Canterbury	47	10	44	0	118
1950–51	Balmain Tigers	25	2	3	0	12
1954	St. George Dragons	3	0	0	0	0
	Total	75	12	47	0	130
Representative
Years	Team	Pld	T	G	FG	P
1948	New South Wales	2	0	8	0	16
1948–49	Australia	0	0	0	0	0
- Source: Whiticker/Hudson

Bruce Hopkins (6 December 1924 – 26 December 2013) was an Australian rugby league footballer who played in the 1940s. He played for the Canterbury Bulldogs for three seasons between 1947 and 1949, the Balmain Tigers for two seasons between 1950 and 1951, the St. George Dragons for one season in 1954.

Hopkins represented New South Wales in 1947 and 1948 and for the Australian national side in 1948. He attended Sydney Boys High School, graduating in 1942. While serving in the Australian Army in Townsville, he played for Centrals ASA rugby league club during 1945 and 1946. Hopkins played for Canterbury-Bankstown at halfback in the 1947 NSWRFL season's grand final, losing to Balmain. The following year he was first selected to play for Australia, but did not appear in any Test matches. He is remembered as the first ever Canterbury-Bankstown player to be selected for a Kangaroo Tour.
