= Tom Tyquin =

Australian rugby league footballer

Personal information
- Full name: Thomas James Tyquin
- Born: 18 June 1932; Brisbane, Queensland
- Died: 15 July 2015 (aged 83)

Playing information
- Position: Second-row, Lock
Club
Years	Team	Pld	T	G	FG	P
1953–57	Souths (Brisbane)
Representative
Years	Team	Pld	T	G	FG	P
1953–57	Queensland	14	8	0	0	24
1956–57	Australia	6	0	0	0	0
- Relatives: Bill Tyquin (brother)

Thomas James Tyquin (18 June 1932 – 15 July 2015) was an Australian rugby league player. He was a member of the Australian squad which won the inaugural Rugby League World Cup in 1957.

== Club football ==
Tyquin was a lock forward who alongside his brother, Bill, played his club football with Souths (Brisbane).

== National representative career ==
Tom Tyquin made six Test appearances for Australia after debuting in the 1956 domestic series against New Zealand. He toured with the 1956–57 Kangaroos playing in two Tests and thirteen tour matches. He was selected in the 1957 Australian World Cup squad. A number of his representative appearances were played as a second-row forward.
