= Nevyl Hand =

Australia international rugby league football

Personal information
- Full name: Nevyl Reginald Hand
- Born: 2 March, 1923; Sydney, New South Wales, Australia
- Died: 11 April 2014 (aged 91); Cootamundra, New South Wales

Playing information
- Position: Prop
Club
Years	Team	Pld	T	G	FG	P
1946–48	North Sydney	29	2	0	0	6
Representative
Years	Team	Pld	T	G	FG	P
1948	Australia	2	0	0	0	0
1947–48	New South Wales	2	0	0	0	0
1947–48	NSW City	2	1	0	0	3
1949	NSW Country	1	0	0	0	0

Nevyl Hand (1923-2014) was an Australian professional rugby league footballer who played in the 1940s. He played for North Sydney in the NSWRL competition as a prop.

== Playing career ==
Hand made his debut for North Sydney in the 1946 season. In 1947, Hand was selected to play for both New South Wales and NSW City. In 1948, Hand was selected to play for Australia and featured in tests against New Zealand and Great Britain.

At the end of 1948, North Sydney finished last on the table and claimed the wooden spoon. Hand requested a release from Norths and joined Cootamundra who played in the NSW Country competition.

In 1949, Hand was selected to play for NSW Country against NSW City. Hand then went on to play with various other teams in country New South Wales and later became a referee. He died on 11 April 2014.
