= Bob Lulham =

Australian rugby league footballer (1926–1986)

- Lulham in 1947

Personal information
- Full name: Robert John Lulham
- Born: 2 November 1926 Newcastle, New South Wales, Australia
- Died: 24 December 1986 (aged 60) Tenterfield, New South Wales, Australia

Playing information
- Position: Wing, Centre
Club
Years	Team	Pld	T	G	FG	P
1947–53	Balmain	85	85	45	0	345
Representative
Years	Team	Pld	T	G	FG	P
1947–49	New South Wales	9	8	0	0	24
1948–49	Australia	3	1	0	0	3
1947–49	NSW City	11	11	0	0	33

Robert John Lulham (2 November 1926 – 24 December 1986) was an Australian rugby league footballer who played in the 1940s and 1950s. An Australia international and New South Wales state representative three-quarter back, he played in Sydney for the Balmain club, with whom he won the 1947 NSWRFL Premiership.

== Rugby career ==
A quick-paced wing, Lulham came to Sydney from Newcastle and in his first season in the NSWRFL premiership represented New South Wales in all matches. In the 1947 NSWRFL season he was also the League's top try-scorer, breaking the record for most tries in a debut season with 28 and most tries in a season for Balmain Tigers in the club's history. At the end of the season he played in Balmain's grand final win. At the end of the following season he was selected for the 1948–49 Kangaroo tour of Great Britain and France, making his debut in the Third Test against Great Britain before going on to play two Tests against France. He continued playing for Balmain, also captaining the club.

== Poisoning ==
In July 1953, Lulham was in the headlines after his mother-in-law, Veronica Mabel Monty, 45, was charged with attempted murder, after giving him Thall-rat, a rat poison containing thallium. It soon hit the media, as it was one of 46 similar cases of thallium poisoning in Australia, the "thallium craze", leading to 10 deaths in the early 1950s. Monty was charged and arrested in August. Monty was also poisoned with thallium while on bail, but recovered as the dose was low.

The sensational hearing in Sydney revealed that Monty had moved in with her daughter, Judy, and son-in-law in June 1952 following an operation and separation from her husband. The Lulhams had been married only six months when her mother had moved in. Lulham and Monty then had an "intimate relationship" three times. Once, on 26 June 1953, after Judy had gone to bed early while listening to the Ashes test from Lords, once while Judy was at church, and again when he had come home from work early. Monty testified she made a poisoned Milo for herself on 2 July as she was contemplating suicide, but the Lulhams asked for drinks too and she mixed up the cups. In September 1953, she was ordered to stand trial. Monty was found not guilty in December.

== Personal life ==
Lulham was born on Tuesday 2 November 1926, into a family of three boys. His father was a veteran of the Gallipoli Campaign.

Judy Lulham divorced Bob Lulham in early 1955 as a result of the revelations about his affair with her mother. Her father also divorced her mother at the same time. Due to the widespread publication of details of the cases, Monty suicided by gunshot soon afterwards. After his poisoning and divorce, Lulham never played first grade football again.

Lulham remarried and had two children, Kerry and Wayne. He died of a heart attack at his home in Tenterfield, New South Wales on Christmas Eve, 1986, at the age of 60. He was buried at the Tenterfield Cemetery.

== See also ==
- Recipe for Murder
