= Gareth Price (rugby league) =

Wales international rugby league footballer and coach

Personal information
- Full name: Gareth Morgan Price
- Born: 18 August 1917 Llanelli, Wales
- Died: 19 July 1992 (aged 74) Leeds, England

Playing information

Rugby union
Club
Years	Team	Pld	T	G	FG	P
	Llanelli RFC

Rugby league
- Position: Centre
Club
Years	Team	Pld	T	G	FG	P
1938–49	Leeds	155	74	0	1	224
1949–51	Halifax	87	22	0	1	68
1951–52	Doncaster	33	0	0	0	0
	Total	275	96	0	2	292
Representative
Years	Team	Pld	T	G	FG	P
1945–48	Wales	11	4	0	0	12

Coaching information
Club
Years	Team	Gms	W	D	L	W%
1951–≥51	Doncaster

Gareth Morgan Price (18 August 1917 – 19 July 1992) was a Welsh rugby union and professional rugby league footballer who played in the 1940s and 1950s, and coached rugby league in the 1950s. He played club level rugby union (RU) for Llanelli RFC, and representative level rugby league (RL) for Wales, and at club level for Leeds, Halifax and Doncaster (two spells) (captain), as a centre, and coached at club level for Doncaster,

== Background ==
Gareth Price was born in Llanelli, Wales and he died aged 74 from pancreatic cancer at Leeds General Infirmary, West Yorkshire, England.

== International honours ==
Gareth Price won 11 caps for Wales in 1945–1948 while at Leeds.
