= Keith Froome =

Australia international rugby league footballer

Personal information
- Full name: George Keith Froome
- Born: 20 August 1920 Armidale, New South Wales
- Died: 28 January 1978 (aged 57) Bellingen, New South Wales

Playing information
- Position: Halfback
Club
Years	Team	Pld	T	G	FG	P
1943–50	Newtown	72	16	120	0	288
Representative
Years	Team	Pld	T	G	FG	P
1941–42	Country NSW	2	0	1	0	2
1941–49	New South Wales	9	2	4	0	14
1948–50	City NSW	3	0	4	0	8
1948–49	Australia	8	2	12	0	30

Coaching information
Representative
Years	Team	Gms	W	D	L	W%
1949	Australia	2	1	0	1	50

George Keith Froome (1920–1978) was an Australian rugby league player. He was a halfback for the Australian national team. He played in eight Tests between 1948 and 1949 as captain on two occasions.

== Playing career ==
Known as Keith, he was born in Armidale but grew up in Newcastle, New South Wales and played his junior football with Wests Newcastle. He was a talented soccer player as a youngster and also played first grade and district representative cricket in Newcastle. He had first represented in rugby league for New South Wales in 1941.

During World War II he was required to continue working as a boilermaker, it being an essential service. He joined the AIF in 1944 and served with the 2/43 Australian Infantry Battalion. He was stationed at Goulburn and though restricted in availability signed to play with Sydney's Newtown club in 1943 and played two first grade games that year. He served overseas from 1944 to 1945.

He returned to Newtown after the war and played all of his first grade football with the club from 1946 to 1950 scoring 288 points as a goalkicking half-back in 72 first grade games.

After the war he made State appearances regularly against Queensland from 1946 to 1948 and against a touring New Zealand side in 1948.

He made his Australian Test debut in 1948 in the domestic series against New Zealand and played in both Tests kicking five goals in all.

He was selected on the 1948-49 Kangaroo Tour of England and appeared in four Tests and 12 minor tour matches. He was the tour's leading goalkicker finishing with 39 goals (and 3 tries) in his 16 appearances ahead of John Graves's 35 goals.

In 1949 he was named by a local newspaper. as New South Wales' Player of Year after captaining NSW to a 4-0 whitewash against Queensland in the interstate series.

At the end of the 1949 season he was selected to lead an Australian side on a ten match tour of New Zealand. He captained Australia in both Tests of the series to a loss and a win and played in three additional tour matches scoring 2 tries and 11 goals in all.

== Post playing ==
At the tail end of his playing career Froome coached a country side in Gunnedah. Keith and his family settled in Bellingen NSW. He had a career in the club industry and as a liquor sales representative. Keith succumbed to cancer aged 57 on 28 January 1978.

In 2008, the centenary year of rugby league in Australia, Froome was named in the Newtown Jets 18-man team of the century.

== Sources & Footnotes ==
- Whiticker, Alan (2004) Captaining the Kangaroos, New Holland, Sydney
- Andrews, Malcolm (2006) The ABC of Rugby League Austn Broadcasting Corpn, Sydney

Preceded by Bill Tyquin	Australian national rugby league captain 1949	Succeeded by Clive Churchill
