= Albert Pimblett =

GB & England international rugby league footballer

Personal information
- Full name: Albert John Pimblett
- Born: 24 February 1919 St Helens, England
- Died: 21 May 2001 (aged 82)

Playing information
- Position: Centre
Club
Years	Team	Pld	T	G	FG	P
1936–39	St Helens Recs	104	59	0	0	177
1946–47	Halifax	25	10	0	0	30
1947–50	Warrington	98	40	0	0	120
1950–51	Salford	18	1	0	0	3
	Total	245	110	0	0	330
Representative
Years	Team	Pld	T	G	FG	P
1937–49	Lancashire	7	2	0	0	6
1948–49	Great Britain	3	4	0	0	12
1948–49	England	3	2	0	0	6
- Relatives: Geoff Pimblett

Albert John Pimblett (1919 – 2001) was an English professional rugby league footballer who played in the 1940s and 1950s. He played at representative level for Great Britain and England, and at club level for Halifax, Warrington and Salford, as a centre.

== Playing career ==
=== Championship final appearances ===
Pimblett played at centre in Warrington's 15–5 victory over Bradford Northern in the Championship Final during the 1947–48 season at Maine Road, Manchester on Saturday 8 May 1948.

=== County Cup Final appearances ===
Pimblett played at centre in Warrington's 8–14 defeat by Wigan in the 1948–49 Lancashire Cup Final during the 1948–49 season at Station Road, Swinton on Saturday 13 November 1948.

=== International honours ===
Pimblett won caps for England while at Warrington in 1948 against Wales, in 1949 against France, and won caps for Great Britain while at Warrington in 1948 against Australia (3 matches).
