= Len Smith (rugby) =

Australia dual-code rugby international footballer

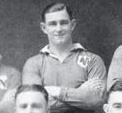

Personal information
- Full name: Leonard Herbert Smith
- Born: 25 March 1918 Paddington, New South Wales
- Died: 26 April 2000 (aged 82) Bexley North, New South Wales

Playing information

Rugby union
- Position: Centre, Five-eighth
Club
Years	Team	Pld	T	G	FG	P
1937–39	Eastern Suburbs RUFC
Representative
Years	Team	Pld	T	G	FG	P
1939	Australia	1				0
1939	NSW	9				15

Rugby league
- Position: Five-eighth
Club
Years	Team	Pld	T	G	FG	P
1943–48	Newtown	74				131
Representative
Years	Team	Pld	T	G	FG	P
1947–48	NSW	8				21
1948	Australia	2				0

Coaching information
Representative
Years	Team	Gms	W	D	L	W%
1949	Australia

Len Smith (1918–2000) was an Australian representative rugby union and rugby league footballer who played in the 1930s and 1940s. He captained the Kangaroos in two Tests in 1948 and was controversially omitted from the 1948-49 Kangaroo tour of Great Britain.

== Rugby union career ==
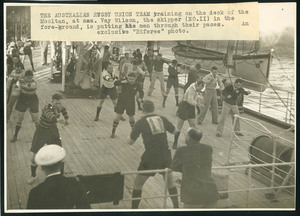
1939 Wallabies training on deck en route to England

Smith played with the Eastern Suburbs RUFC in the 1930s and after making state representative appearance for New South Wales against Queensland, Victoria and the All Blacks he was selected as a Wallaby for the ill-fated 1939 tour of Great Britain. Docking at Southampton the day before World War II was declared, the side left England without playing a game.

== Wartime ==
Smith enlisted in the AIF during World War II and served in Palestine, Egypt and Syria before returning home in 1942. Playing rugby league in the army Smith realised that many union players in Sydney had converted and on his return he switched codes to be able to compete against the best players. He remained in the Army whilst playing for Newtown. For the 1944 semi-final against the St George Smith had to travel 25 hours by train from an army camp in Melbourne.Smith saw further active service and a command from 1944 to 1945 in New Guinea. At discharge in October 1945 he was a Captain in the 2/2 Australian Ordnance Stores Company.

== Rugby league career ==
=== Club career ===
Smith joined the Newtown Bluebags in 1942 and played with the club until 1948, aside from the 1945 season when he was on active service.

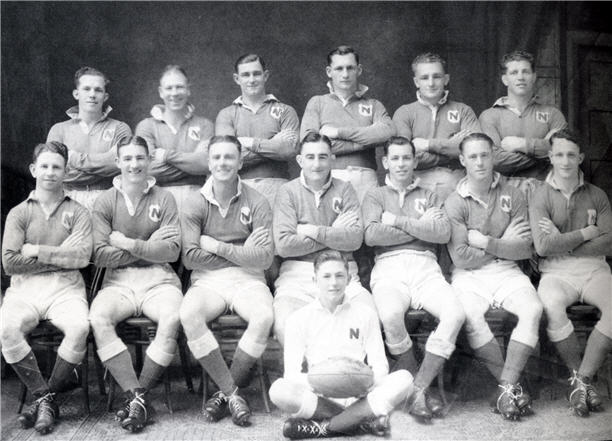
Smith,(back row 3rd from left) in the Newtown 1943 premiership team

He scored 45 tries for Newtown during his five-year career at the club. During the final years of the Second World War, when players and coaches became scarce, Len Smith co-coached the Newtown first grade team with Frank Farrell.

=== Representative career ===
He was selected in Sydney Firsts in 1946. In 1947 at age 28 he was selected as captain of Sydney and NSW and won the NSW Player of the Year award.

He debuted for the Kangaroos in 1948 being named as captain-coach for a two Test series against New Zealand. The Australians were beaten in a shock upset 21–19 in the 1st Test in Sydney but regrouped to win the 2nd test in Brisbane 13–4. Smith's tactics of running himself like a forward at the Kiwi centres was critical to the victory.

He is listed on the Australian Players Register as Kangaroo No. 247. In 1948 he was also named New South Wales player of the year.

=== 1948 selection controversy ===
Having just played a key role in the Kangaroos' 3-1 series victory over New Zealand it seemed a mere formality that Smith would be chosen to lead the team of young inexperienced Kangaroos on the end of year 1948 Tour of England. However on the night the side was announced Smith was left out of the party.

It was unfathomable that the current Australian captain/coach having would not be good enough to be selected in the touring squad of 28. There was press uproar at the time and lobbying for a change by Newtown. Some of those involved at the time when interviewed many years later by sporting journalists still spoke bitterly of the episode.

=== Accolades ===
In 2008, the centenary year of rugby league in Australia, Smith was named in the Newtown Jets 18-man team of the century.

=== Dual-code international status ===
Regarding the 1939 Wallaby squad, the Whiticker reference records that "the squad played at exhibition match in Bombay on the journey home so that the players could be afforded international status" and consequently refers to Smith as a dual-code international. However, the Pollard reference records that the Wallabies played against a "Gymkhana XV made up of military men and others".

== Later life ==
After football Smith became a respected sportswriter establishing Sporting Life magazine. He was a senior administrator in the harness racing industry and worked for the New South Wales Trotting Authority. He was involved in the 1967 establishment of the Miracle Mile event.

Smith died on 25 April 2000 in St George Hospital following bowel cancer surgery.

== Sources ==
- Whiticker, Alan (2004) Captaining the Kangaroos, New Holland, Sydney
- Pollard, Jack (1984) Australian Rugby Union: The Game and the Players Angus and Robertson Publishing

== Footnotes ==
Sporting positions
Preceded by Albert Johnston; 1946	Coach Australia; 1948	Succeeded by Col Maxwell; 1948-1949
Preceded by Ron Bailey	Captain Australia; 1948	Succeeded by Col Maxwell
