= Col Maxwell =

Australia international rugby league footballer and coach

Personal information
- Full name: Colin Maxvilla Maxwell
- Born: 23 June 1917 Lismore, New South Wales, Australia
- Died: 19 June 2001 (aged 83) Nelson Bay, New South Wales, Australia

Playing information
- Position: Centre
Club
Years	Team	Pld	T	G	FG	P
1936	Bowraville
1937	Coffs Harbour
1938–40	Wests (Newcastle)
1940	St. George	9	4	0	0	12
1945	Western Suburbs	5	2	0	0	6
1946–47	Wests (Newcastle)
1948–49	Western Suburbs	35	3	0	0	9
1950–52	Maitland
	Total	49	9	0	0	27
Representative
Years	Team	Pld	T	G	FG	P
1948–52	New South Wales	1	0	0	0	0
1948–51	Australia	1	0	0	0	0

Coaching information
Club
Years	Team	Gms	W	D	L	W%
1948–49	Australia	6	3	0	3	50
1949	Western Suburbs	20	12	0	8	60
	Total	26	15	0	11	58
- Source: As of 19 February 2019

Colin Maxwell (1917–2001) was an Australian international rugby league footballer whose career ran from the 1930s to the 1950s. He was a centre for the Australian national team in one Test in 1948 in which he captained the side.

== Club career ==
Born in Lismore in northern New South Wales he played for Bowraville and Coffs Harbour and in Country representative sides. He joined Wests Newcastle in 1938. He came to Sydney in 1940 for one season with the St George Dragons. After World War II he played for the Western Suburbs Magpies for a season, then returned to Newcastle to captain-coach Wests Newcastle in 1946-47 before another two Sydney seasons with the Magpies in 1948–49.

== War service ==
He spent three years from 1942 -1945 in the RAAF as a leading aircraftmen and appeared in a number of armed forces rugby league exhibition matches.

== Representative career ==
1948 was the sole year of Maxwell's controversial representative career. His only state appearance for New South Wales was in the first match of that year's interstate series against Queensland.

When the Australian Test side was chosen for the domestic series against New Zealand Maxwell was named as a reserve back and did not figure in the Tests. He had been dropped from the New South Wales squad before the end of the interstate series and on the night the Kangaroo Tour side was announced Maxwell wasn't in Sydney with the other representative hopefuls having already left on a train bound for Newcastle. Inexplicably Maxwell was not only selected to the tour squad but was named captain and was expected to take on the duty of coaching the squad during the tour of England and France.

Whilst Maxwell was a reliable centre whose career had been interrupted by the war and injuries the mystery concerned how the incumbent Test captain Len Smith who one week earlier had led the Kangaroos to victory over New Zealand was suddenly not good enough to fit into the 28 man touring squad. Theories abounded regarding either religious bigotry from the selectors or coaching politics. See Selection controversy in Len Smith.

Due to injury and illness Maxwell did not play in the first Test loss against Great Britain at Leeds. He played in 11 minor tour matches and captained Australia in the second Test at Swinton which Great Britain won 16–7. Although Maxwell was a popular captain on Tour the match results were not good. He is listed on the Australian Players Register as Kangaroo No.262. He did not represent at state or national level again.

Maxwell's final seasons were as captain-coach of Maitland from 1950 -1952. After football, he ran a newsagency.

== Sources & Footnotes ==
- Whiticker, Alan (2004) Captaining the Kangaroos, New Holland, Sydney
- Andrews, Malcolm (2006) The ABC of Rugby League Austn Broadcasting Corpn, Sydney

Sporting positions
Preceded by Len Smith	Captain Australia; 1948	Succeeded by Wally O'Connell
