= Yueyue =

Yueyue, Yue Yue, Yüyue, Yueyü, Yüyü, or variant may refer to:

- Deng Senyue, nicknamed Yueyue, Chinese rhythmic gymnast
- Shen Yueyue (沈跃跃), Chinese politician
- Little Yueyue, Chinese internet celebrity
- Xia Gui (1195–1224), also known as Yüyü, Chinese landscape painter
- Yue Yue (王悦, Wang Yue), Chinese girl killed in a traffic incident
- Yû Yû, Japanese animanga

== See also ==
- Yuyu (disambiguation)
- Yuyue (disambiguation)
- Yueyu, the Chinese dialect family including Cantonese
