= Zhang Shourong =

Chinese metallurgist (1928–2024)

- 张寿荣
- Born: 17 February 1928; Jinan, Shandong, China
- Died: 14 July 2024 (aged 96); Wuhan, Hubei, China
- Education: National Peiyang University
- Scientific career
- Fields: Metallurgy
- Workplaces: Anshan Iron and Steel Plant; Wuhan Iron and Steel Plant

Chinese name
- Simplified Chinese: 张寿荣
- Traditional Chinese: 張壽榮
Transcriptions
Standard Mandarin
- Hanyu Pinyin: Zhāng Shòuróng

Zhang Shourong (Chinese: 张寿荣; 17 February 1928 – 14 July 2024) was a Chinese metallurgist, and an academician of the Chinese Academy of Engineering.

== Biography ==
Zhang was born in Jinan, Shandong, on 17 February 1928, while his ancestral home is in Ding County (now Dingzhou), Hebei. In October 1945, he was admitted to the Department of Civil Engineering, Tianjin University of Commerce (now Hebei University), but dropped out after 11 months and entered the Department of Metallurgy, National Peiyang University (now Tianjin University).

After university in June 1951, Zhang was assigned to Anshan Iron and Steel Plant. There, he was in turn the leader of the Research Group, head of Production Planning Department, and finally assistant director.

In May 1956, Zhang was transferred to Wuhan, capital of central China's Hubei province, and appointed the leader of the Preparatory Group for the Ironmaking Plant of Wuhan Iron and Steel Plant. He successively served as smelting engineer, head of the production department, and head of the technical department. In January 1965, he became deputy chief engineer, rising to chief engineer in May 1980. He also served as chairman of the Science and Technology Association of Wuhan Iron and Steel Corporation between June 1992 and July 2002.

On 14 July 2024, Zhang died in Wuhan, at the age of 96.

== Honours and awards ==
- 1990 State Science and Technology Progress Award (Special) for the Development and Innovation of New Technologies for the '1.7 Meter' Rolling Mill System.
- 1995 Member of the Chinese Academy of Engineering (CAE)
- 1997 Foreign Member of the Mexican Academy of Engineering
