= Stories about Ming Dynasty =

Stories about Ming Dynasty (simplified Chinese: 明朝那些事儿; traditional Chinese: 明朝那些事兒) is a novel based on a collection of internet posts about the Ming Dynasty by Dangnian Mingyue (当年明月) whose real name is Shi Yue (石悅). The novel is the first edited novel from a standard history.

== Background ==
It was first posted on the internet forum Tianya Club by Dangnian Mingyue on March 10, 2006. The post started with the first emperor of the Ming dynasty Zhu Yuanzhang and continued with the posting of the short period after the first emperor. As Dangnian Mingyue was posting the standard history novel online, his posts received numerous clicks and he was met with a lot of positive feedback. Dangnian Mingyue followed the advice of some of his fans to gather his posts and publish them as a book.

By March 21, 2009, Dangnian Mingyue finished posting the last chapter about the Chongzhen Emperor. Before this book was published, there had been no standard history novel like this one in existence. Most of the historical novels before it tended to be more fictions and held little truth.

== Awards ==
The book has sold over 5 million copies. It was the best selling book in 2007-2008 and received multiple awards.
