= Thallium poisoning case of Zhu Ling =

Unsolved 1995 thallium poisoning case in China

Thallium poisoning of Zhu Ling
- Zhu Ling
- Location: Tsinghua University, Beijing
- Date: October 1994 – April 1995
- Victim: Zhu Ling

Zhu Ling (Note: Legal name: Zhu Ling-ling (Chinese: 朱令令; pinyin: Zhū Lìng-lìng). Her family and herself preferred the name Zhu Ling.) (Chinese: 朱令; pinyin: Zhū Lìng, 24 April 1973 – 22 December 2023) was the victim of an unsolved thallium poisoning case in Beijing, China. In late 1994, while studying chemistry at Tsinghua University, she was poisoned; she subsequently fell into a coma in 1995. Her symptoms were posted online via a Usenet newsgroup by her friend Bei Zhicheng from Peking University, and were reviewed and diagnosed by physicians around the world. Although Zhu’s life was saved, she suffered severe neurological damage and permanent physical impairment.

The investigation was closed in 1998 for lack of evidence and went cold until it drew renewed public attention in the 2010s, becoming one of the most high-profile cases in China and giving rise to widespread speculation and conspiracy theories.

== Poisoning ==
=== First hospitalization ===
In 1994, Zhu Ling was a sophomore in Class Wuhua 2 (Class 2 majoring in physical chemistry) at Tsinghua University in Beijing. Classmates described her as attractive, intelligent, and musically talented. She began to show strange and debilitating symptoms on 24 November 1994, when she reported acute abdominal pain, and loss of appetite. On 5 December she again experienced stomach discomfort, and her hair began to fall out.

On the night of 11 December 1994, despite her illness, Zhu Ling insisted on performing with the Tsinghua University Chinese Orchestra at the Beijing Concert Hall, where she played a Guqin solo of the piece "Guangling San." She had to wear glasses because her eyes were painful and at times she could not see at all. Her hair fell out completely within a few days of the performance.

Zhu was admitted to Beijing Tongren Hospital on 23 December 1994. Her condition gradually improved, she was allowed to return to school, and she was discharged on 23 January 1995.

=== Second hospitalization ===
A new semester began on 20 February 1995. On 27 February, shortly after returning to school, Zhu experienced intense pain in both legs. Her condition deteriorated further on 6 March, with severe leg pain and dizziness, and her parents took her to Peking University Third Hospital for treatment. Professor Chen Zhenyang (陈震阳), who was involved in her diagnosis and treatment, recorded in his paper "Introduction to a Rare Case of Severe Thallium Poisoning" that on 8 March Zhu "once again experienced intense foot pain, pain in the calves, so severe that she dared not touch any objects. This time it was more severe than the before, and the condition developed rapidly, extending to the lower back."

On 9 March 1995, Zhu Ling's parents took her to the neurology clinic at Peking Union Medical College Hospital (PUMCH). After examining her, Professor Li Shunwei (李舜伟), told Zhu's mother that her condition was "very similar to a case of thallium poisoning at Tsinghua University in the 1960s." In the medical record for that day, Li described Zhu's condition as follows: "(the patient is) mentally clear and articulate, experiencing significant hair loss, limbs hurt by touching, redness at the fingertips and soles which are not swollen but with elevated temperature. Reduced sensation in the fingertips and below the knees, with a symmetric knee reflex. Ankle reflex is slow. Highly suspicious of heavy metal poisoning, such as thallium and beryllium, consulted with Director Zhang Shoulin and professors, including Ding Maobai. On admission, Zhu "had clear Mees' lines on her fingernails, raising suspicion of possible thallium poisoning".

To clarify the diagnosis, Li contacted Professor Zhang Shoulin at the Chinese Academy of Medical Sciences. That same day, Zhu, accompanied by her mother, was examined by Zhang, who suspected acute thallium or arsenic poisoning; the institute, however, was unable to conduct the necessary tests. Zhu denied any contact with thallium in class, a claim confirmed by Tsinghua's chemistry department. PUMCH also cited a lack of equipment to perform such tests, and so–at the hospital where the future suspect Sun Wei's mother worked—no thallium test was carried out.

=== Diagnosis and treatment ===
On 15 March 1995, Zhu was admitted to the neurology ward of PUMCH, presenting with "hair loss, abdominal pain, and joint and muscle pain for three months, pain in the distal ends of both lower limbs for seven days; and dizziness for three days". The admission note recorded that she had had abdominal pain without an obvious cause for three months before admission (from 8 December 1994), characterized by continuous dull pain with intermittent colicky pain, and that hair loss had occurred, accompanied by soreness in both shoulders and the knee joints. The initial diagnosis was"peripheral neuropathy; cause of limb pain and redness to be determined". The Lumbar puncture performed on the same day yielded normal results. A neurology consultation the next day ruled out autoimmune diseases, poisoning, and metabolic disease, and PUMCH treated her for Guillain-Barré syndrome.

After admission, her condition worsened rapidly. It affected her chest, her facial muscles became distorted, and her speech grew unclear. She was unable to drink water without choking, and breathing difficulties emerged. Treatment involved broad-spectrum antibiotics, antiviral drugs, corticosteroids, immunosuppressants, and albumin injections, among other measures.

Zhu fell into a coma on 20 March. On 23 March she developed central respiratory failure and PUMCH performed a tracheotomy. After a comprehensive neurology discussion the same day, the diagnosis was revised to acute disseminated encephalomyelitis (ADEM), and treatment involved plasma-exchange therapy.

PUMCH began plasma-exchange therapy on 24 March, continuing until 18 April, for a total of seven sessions. Each session involved 1,400-2,000 milliliters of plasma, amounting to about 10,000 milliliters in total. Some commentators believe this played a crucial role in sustaining Zhu's life in the absence of a confirmed diagnosis; during this process, however, Zhu contracted Hepatitis C.

On 28 March, Zhu Ling developed a pneumothorax in the left lung and was transferred to the Intensive care unit (ICU) at PUMCH, where her breathing was supported by a ventilator. A comprehensive neurology consultation was held on 3 April, with experts from PUMCH, PLA General Hospital 301, Boai Hospital, Beijing Hospital, and other institutions. The consultation concluded that the current diagnosis and treatment were appropriate. Afterwards, Zhu's parents learned from some of the experts that, because thallium poisoning had been ruled out, the consultation had felt obliged to explore other possible causes.

Zhu Ling remained in a coma for five months, awakening only on 31 August. PUMCH conducted numerous tests, including for HIV, lumbar puncture, magnetic resonance imaging (MRI), immune system evaluations, chemical poisoning assessments, anti-nuclear antibodies, nuclear antigen antibodies, Lyme disease, and urinary arsenic. All results were negative except for Lyme disease. During this period, the hospital told Zhu's family that thallium poisoning could be "ruled out".

== Diagnosis via the Internet ==
Frustrated by local physicians' inability to help Zhu Ling, her friends Cai Quanqing and Bei Zhicheng, undergraduates at Peking University, posted an "SOS" letter on a number of Internet Usenet groups on 10 April 1995, describing her symptoms and asking for help with a diagnosis. By 1995, only a few research institutes in the People's Republic of China had Internet connections, among them the laboratory of Cai's advisor. Responses began arriving within hours, and news reports hailed the event as a milestone in remote diagnosis by Internet, especially within China. Of the more than 1,500 responses Zhu's friends received, roughly one-third suggested thallium poisoning, whose common antidote Prussian blue.

Because of the limited Internet infrastructure in China, Dr. Li Xin, a Chinese student at UCLA, and Dr. John W. Aldis of the U.S. Embassy in Bejing collaborated to establish the UCLA Zhu Ling Thallium Poisoning Telemedicine Network. In 1996, Li and his colleagues published a paper describing the construction and operation of this remote-diagnosis system and its significant role in the case. Bei Zhicheng, Cai Quanqing, and others uploaded Zhu's case information—including photographs taken at the onset of the illness, laboratory results, neurological findings, and radiographic images such as chest X-rays and brain MRIs. Li and his colleagues at the UCLA School of Medicine set up servers to store the data and to collate and categorize emails received from around the world, allowing medical experts internationally to review Zhu's condition and reply with follow-up questions for diagnostic and treatment suggestions.

According to the diagnostic and treatment logs at UCLA, as early as April 10, the day Bei Zhicheng sent the email, there were doctors responding with a diagnosis of thallium poisoning. Dr. Robert Fink, a neurosurgeon in the United States, believed that heavy metal poisoning was highly probable. However, PUMCH replied at that time, stating that all laboratory tests related to heavy metal poisoning had been conducted. With further communication, American doctors eventually discovered that PUMCH had only performed screening tests for metal arsenic. As time went by, more medical experts believed that thallium poisoning could not be ruled out and insisted that Peking Union Medical College Hospital should promptly conduct screening for metal thallium. Doctors from St. Jude Children's Research Hospital pointed out in their response, "Suspected Thallium poisoning can be nearly diagnosed based on symptoms such as hair loss, gastrointestinal problems, and neurological issues". Dr. Fink recalled that as Zhu Ling's condition worsened, they urged PUMCH through various channels to conduct thallium poisoning screening for a quicker and more accurate diagnosis. At that time, in addition to leveraging connections at the U.S. Embassy in Beijing, they directly faxed relevant academic articles to PUMCH. Dr. Aldis also personally communicated with old friends who were healthcare professionals at PUMCH.

On Apr 18, 1995, Bei Zhicheng brought the translated emails to the ICU of PUMCH to provide to the doctors as a reference. There was no proactive response. Few people reviewed it, and the diagnosis of thallium poisoning and the corresponding testing methods mentioned in the email were not adopted. This resulted in the delayed impact of the online remote diagnosis at that time.

When Zhu Ling's parents requested the doctors to consider the opinions presented in the email, PUMCH doctors responded with, "We have the ability to consult international medical databases". They also mentioned "Peking University students bring many problems". Many years later, when Bei Zhicheng had a heated online debate with Sun Wei in 2005 on Tianya BBS, he wrote, "The former director of the ICU at Peking Union Medical College Hospital refused to conduct further tests for heavy metal poisoning. Even after the misdiagnosis at Peking Union Medical College Hospital was discovered, he showed no remorse. Astonishingly, he said at a hospital meeting that 'This matter is an attempt by Western anti-China forces to discredit the Chinese medical community'".

Dr. Aldis documented in Zhu Ling's medical records: until May 16, Bei received nearly 2000 emails. On the other hand, Bei and his friends at Peking University attempted to provide PUMCH with a modem, hoping to facilitate direct communication with overseas medical professionals. Unfortunately, due to some "non-technical reasons," all their attempts were unsuccessful. Dr. Aldis expressed deep regret at the limited communication channels between overseas doctors and PUMCH at that time, which hindered the exchange of information regarding Zhu Ling's diagnosis and treatment.

=== Subsequent diagnosis and treatment ===
Due to suspicions raised in emails on the internet regarding thallium poisoning, when Zhu Ling's parents learned that Professor Chen Zhenyang (陈震阳) from the Beijing Institute of Labor Protection could conduct thallium poisoning tests, they received the discreet assistance of a PUMCH doctor. They obtained Zhu Ling's urine, cerebrospinal fluid, blood, nails, and hair samples. On April 28, 1995, Zhu's parents went to the Beijing Institute of Labor Protection for testing. The results indicated, "All specimens showed very high levels of thallium, hundreds to thousands of times higher than that of a healthy person, confirming the diagnosis of thallium poisoning." For example, the results on April 28 for various samples were: urine thallium 275 μg/L, blood thallium 31 μg/L, hair thallium 531 μg/kg, nail thallium 22,824 μg/kg, and cerebrospinal fluid thallium 263 μg/L. On the same day, Professor Chen Zhenyang issued a test report, stating that Zhu Ling had suffered from thallium poisoning twice and suspecting intentional poisoning. He also recommended the administration of Prussian blue as an antidote. In a scholarly paper published in 1998, the doctors from PUMCH, responsible for diagnosis and treatment, emphasized that Zhu Ling had "no clear history of toxic substance exposure, early symptoms of abdominal pain and hair loss, self-relieved without specific treatment, and one month later suddenly developed peripheral neuropathy and signs of encephalopathy, not excluding the possibility of second poisonings".

On April 28, even with the test result of thallium poisoning, PUMCH were prepared to issue dimercaprol instead of Prussian blue. After multiple attempts of communication between Dr. Ivan Petrželka in Los Angeles Poison Control Center, Dr. Ashok Jain, Dr John Aldis and many other medial experts, PUMCH finally started treatment with Prussian blue on May 3, 1995.

On Aug 31, 1995, Zhu Ling woke up from a coma lasting for five months. Professor Chen Zhenyang believed that, "Although the patient started to wake up, due to severe poisoning and a prolonged period of unconsciousness, both the central and peripheral nervous systems of the patient were severely damaged." During the recovery phase, "the patient's symptoms improved, the upper limbs could move, and memory also showed some recovery. She could recall some events from earlier years, such as those from junior high school, and express simple questions in unclear language. Before falling ill, the patient used to play string instruments, but now, although she could make some movements resembling playing with her hands, she could not produce any sound from the strings. The coordination between the muscles of the tongue and mouth was impaired, making it impossible for her to express herself in correct language. The muscle strength in both legs was only at grade 1–2. There was a decline in vision, and partial atrophy of the optic nerve. CT scan results showed atrophy throughout the entire brain, including the cerebellum". PUMCH concluded in their paper titled "Clinical Analysis of Five Cases of Thallium Poisoning" that after treatment, "clinical symptoms and signs improved significantly, but due to the prolonged course of the disease, there were sequelae such as optic nerve atrophy, paralysis of both lower limbs, muscle atrophy, and intellectual impairment".

== Hair analysis ==
Zhu Ling's parents collected a small number of hairs from a blanket used by her during the poisoning period (1994–1995) and stored them in a plastic bag since. These samples were obtained by Min He, who, through collaboration with Richard Ash at the University of Maryland, reconstituted the original poisoning process using LA-ICP-MS. The results were published in Forensic Science International in 2018. In summary, it appears that Zhu Ling had suffered roughly four months of repeated exposure to thallium with increased doses and frequency towards the end, as well as roughly two weeks of constant ingestion of large doses of thallium accompanied by an elevated amount of lead. The overall thallium distribution profiles in the analyzed hairs suggested both chronic and acute thallium exposures that correlated well with the sequential presentation of a plethora of symptoms originally experienced by Zhu Ling. Aligning the time-resolved thallium peaks in the hair with her symptoms also provided clues on possible routes of exposure at different poisoning stages.

== Police investigation ==
On the evening of April 28, 1995, when Zhu Ling was diagnosed for thallium poisoning, Zhu Ling's parents immediately requested Professor Xue Fangyu (薛芳渝), then the Deputy Head of the Chemistry Department at Tsinghua University and in charge of student affairs, to report the case. Professor Xue Fangyu consulted He Meiying (贺美英), the Chinese Communist Party Secretary of Tsinghua University at that time, and Tsinghua University President Wang Dazhong. After receiving approval, Professor Xue Fangyu immediately called the deputy director of the Tsinghua University Security Department, who also served as the deputy director of the Tsinghua University Police Station, to report the case. The deputy director, though agreed to report the case over the phone, did not report the case to the police.

The next morning, Zhu Ling's aunt contacted Professor Xue Fangyu again, requesting the immediate relocation of students sharing the same dormitory to preserve the scene, seal Zhu Ling's belongings on campus, and conduct further examinations. However, Professor Xue Fangyu indicated that it would be difficult to relocate the students. Her original words were: "Where else should they move to? It's hard for the school to make such arrangements". Professor Xue also "consoled" Zhu's aunt that it would be Labor Day holidays soon and Zhu's dorm mates will be traveling to Mount Tai and there won't be anyone in the room.

=== Theft case ===
Between April 28 and May 7, a theft case was reported in Zhu Ling's dormitory, where only Zhu Ling's personal belongings were reported lost. Items included a contact lens case, lipstick, shampoo, shower gel, and a water cup.

=== Investigation ===
On May 7, 1995, the Beijing Municipal Public Security Bureau officially initiated an investigation. On the same day, the Tsinghua University Police Station recorded a statement from Zhu Ling's family, informing them about the theft of Zhu Ling's personal belongings.

"According to relevant personnel from the Public Security Bureau, there are only just upwards of twenty units in Beijing that need to use thallium for work, and there are only just upwards of two hundred people who can come into contact with thallium." In 2006, Wang Bu (王补), a veteran police officer with decades of experience in solving cases, inferred, "The scope of suspects is very small," and further speculated based on the strict management of Tsinghua University's female dormitories that "the perpetrator must be someone close to Zhu Ling". Wang Bu was once hailed as the "pioneer of lie detection in the Chinese police force," and according to Zhu Ling's father, he was the director of the Research Department of the Public Security Bureau in Beijing.

Despite Tsinghua University's claims that no undergraduate student could possibly be in contact with thallium, the police found invoices for thallium purchases from suspect Sun Wei's research group in Shijiazhuang.

In late 1995, the head of the Tsinghua University Police Station, Li Mucheng (李慕成), informed Zhu Ling's parents that there was a suspect, and after obtaining approval from higher authorities, they began to make progress, but details were kept confidential. In February 1996, leaders of the Beijing Municipal Public Security Bureau's fourteenth department informed Zhu Ling's family that the case was challenging, and efforts were ongoing.

In 1995, the police made significant progress narrowing down to Sun Wei and told Zhu Ling's parents she is the only suspect. The police found that both Sun and Zhu's fathers are employed by China Earthquake Administration. They asked Zhu's father whether they had enmity during the Cultural Revolution. Zhu's father said he did not know Sun Wei's father.

In 1996, Zhu Ling's parents wrote letters to the authorities to urge resolution of the case. On Feb 27, 1996, Section 14 of Beijing Public Security Bureau told Zhu's parents "the case is difficult to resolve and they are working hard on it".

From this time onwards, and the police have not provided any further updates to Zhu Ling's parents on the case. The case was transferred to a "Director's Special Case". The police said there was nothing they could do without approval from higher authorities, and hinted to Zhu's parents they should use Guanxi to move forward.

One common rumour about the case is that, before Sun Wei's grandfather Sun Yueqi died in late 1995, he made a final petition to Chairman Jiang Zemin, who was his close friend, to release Sun Wei from further investigations. In 2005, when Sun Wei wrote the “Sun Wei Manifesto" (孙维声明) on Tianya BBS, she specifically mentioned this rumour, and countered the argument by stating that the police inquiry into her began on April 2, 1997, just before her graduation, while her grandfather died on October 9, 1995. "The realms of the living and the deceased cannot communicate," she wrote.

==== Second theft case ====
After the first theft case, the police stored Zhu Ling's remaining belongings in the office building of the Chemistry Department. While the investigation progressed, Zhu's parents were told that those belongings were also stolen.

While Zhu Ling was under treatment, Tsinghua University repeatedly urged Zhu's mother to withdraw her from school. Zhu's mother disagreed. As a result, university employees packed up Zhu's belongings (including a camera, a watch, honey, coffee, and a lunch box) and stored them in the Chemistry department. When the second theft was reported, the Chemistry department explained casually that "those things could have been taken away by the janitors".

This theft removed the remaining evidence available to aid the resolution of the case. The final agreement between Tsinghua University and Zhu's parents was for the university to compensate 3000 yuan to Zhu's parents.

It was not until January 2006 that police finally revealed to the media that their initial investigations had yielded a possible suspect. No explanation was given for the delay in releasing this information, and no one has yet been formally charged in connection with the case. The primary investigator, Li Shusen (李树森), told a correspondent from Southern People Weekly in a January 2006 phone interview that investigators have in fact reached some important conclusions regarding the case, but that the information is too sensitive to be released to the public at this time.

According to the official Weibo of the Beijing Municipal Public Security Bureau, in a post published on May 8, 2013, at 17:06, titled "Beijing Police Respond to 'Zhu Ling Ling Case,'" a special task force was formed to conduct the investigation. Based on Zhu Ling's daily activities, over 130 relevant individuals were investigated and interviewed. The work extended to all of the more than 100 units in Beijing that were engaged in the production and use of thallium.

==== Tsinghua's role ====
As a student of Tsinghua University, Zhu Ling's medical expenses were fully covered. However, as of 1996, a year after Zhu Ling's hospitalization and while she was still under rehabilitation, the university ceased to reimburse Zhu Ling's medical expenses. Under both emotional and financial stress, Zhu's parents had no choice but to write a petition letter to Tsinghua to retain Zhu's student status until she could look after herself, or until the criminal case could be resolved.

On April 28, 1997, right before the graduation of Wuhua2 (Zhu Ling's class), Tsinghua University finally responded to Zhu's family with a face-to-face meeting. The attendees included the admission office, general affairs office, student leaders and administrative leaders, Zhu Ling's mother and uncle. Professor Xue Fangyu (薛芳渝) was representing the Chemistry Department. Zhu's family reiterated their petitions, and the school responded firmly that:

- Based on the National regulations, Zhu Ling's student status could not be retained. The school could consider re-admitting her if she recovered and provided a doctor's certification. From this point on, Zhu Ling was an alumna of the school.
- The cost of Zhu Ling's medical expenses was an astronomical number for the school. The school could not afford it. The school would only reimburse medical costs if Zhu Ling were to retain student status.
- Tsinghua would not participate in legal action against PUMCH.

Regarding the school's responsibility to manage the chemistry lab and poisonous materials, the response was that "Tsinghua is managing the chemistry lab and lab materials very well. There's no problem on our end".

===== Conversation with Wuhua2 =====
Zhu Ling's uncle Zhu Sansan (朱三三）, after seeing her niece suffering from immense pain and her family suffering from both emotional and financial pressure, decided to speak to Zhu Ling's classmates. Professor Xue Fangyu openly disapproved of any contact between Zhu's family and Zhu's classmates.

On April 3, 1997, despite Professor Xue's disapproval, Zhu Sansan went to Tsinghua campus and met with Zhu Ling's classmates. The attendees were:

- Huang Kaisheng (黄开胜) (Zhu Ling's boyfriend and a fellow member of the Tsinghua University Chinese Orchestra)
- Xue Gang (薛刚) (Communist Youth League Secretary of the Wuhua2 class)
- Zhang Li (张利) (class leader of the Wuhua2 class)
- Pan Feng (潘峰) (boyfriend of Wang Qi, one of Zhu Ling's roommates)
- Wang Qi (王琪) （Zhu Ling's roommate）
- Jin Ya (金亚) （Zhu Ling's roommate）

Zhu Sansan wanted to meet more classmates, but Xue Gang blocked him from doing so because "it is inappropriate for you to meet the classmates".

Zhu Sansan invited them to lunch. Wang Qi and Jin Ya remained silent throughout. Zhu's mother imagined everyone must be sympathetic or indignant about Zhu Ling's suffering. However, contrary to her imagination, "everyone was aloof and indifferent. Nobody wanted to talk. Nobody ate much."

In Sun Wei's Manifesto on Tianya in 2005, Sun Wei described the situation as follows:

Zhu Ling's uncle came to school and summoned many students. He said "this case has been dragged for so long. Zhu Ling's family is suffering financially. Now the resolution is close." And he added "there are many formalities when police handles this case. We decided to bypass the procedures and do something on our own".

Sun Wei stated in her manifesto that the students who attended this conversation soon informed her of it. Her family notified the school and the security department. Worried about her safety, her family decided to keep her home.

After this conversation, Professor Xue Fangyu was "extremely dissatisfied".

Both Zhu's mother and Zhu's uncle have written letters to Zhu Ling's classmates, seeking their help to resolve the case. The letters did not reach the hands of her classmates. Years later, when Tong Yufeng and other classmates visited Zhu Ling in the hospital, they were totally unaware of the letters. They even had no idea Zhu Ling's poisoning was a criminal case. When Tong asked another classmate, Zhang Li, whether he had received letters from Zhu's family, Zhang said: "No, they must have been submitted to the department by Xue Gang".

== Suspect ==
The main suspect after police investigation is Sun Wei (孙维) (or Shiyan Sun or Jasmine Sun, born 10 August 1973). Sun is a native of Beijing and Zhu Ling's roommate. The other two roommates are Jin Ya (金亚) from Changji, Xinjiang and Wang Qi (王琪) from Baoji, Shaanxi. Both Sun Wei and Zhu Ling were members of the Tsinghua University Chinese Orchestra. Zhu Ling played the Guqin and Zhongruan. Sun Wei played the Zhongruan.

On Mar 25 and May 20 of 1997, Zhu Ling's family wrote petition letters to Beijing Public Security Bureau and the Party leaders, urging the resolution of the case.

According to Sun Wei, during the investigation in 1997, Tsinghua University also said to the police that Sun Wei was the only student who could have had access to thallium compound among the students with a close relationship to Zhu Ling.

On April 2, 1997, The Beijing Public Security Bureau's Section 14 brought Sun Wei in for questioning, citing the reason as a "simple understanding of the situation, just changing the location". According to the newly amended Criminal Procedure Law of the People's Republic of China, which came into effect on January 1, 1997, Article 92[h] stipulates that "for criminal suspects who do not need to be arrested or detained, they can be summoned to a designated location within the city or county where the suspect is located or to his residence for questioning, but a certificate from the people's procuratorate or public security organ should be presented. The maximum duration for continuous summons or detention shall not exceed twelve hours. Criminal suspects shall not be de facto detained through continuous summons or detentions." After being continuously questioned for 8 hours, Sun Wei signed the interrogation record, and then Section 14 informed Sun Wei's family to pick her up. This was the first and only time Sun was questioned by the public security department.

The authorities refused to release the results of their investigation to Zhu Ling's parents after they appealed. However, Tsinghua University refused to issue Sun Wei's B.S. certificate and refused to provide her with a document needed to obtain a passport or visa in 1997. It is believed that Sun Wei has changed her name to Sun Shiyan (孙释颜) and her birthday from August 10, 1979 to October 12, 1979.

The case began to draw extensive public attention near the end of 2005, after an ID named "skyoneline" posted on one of the largest Chinese online bulletin boards, Tianya Club, again questioning the innocence of the suspect and her family's role in blocking investigation and prosecution of the case. In response, after over ten years of silence, on 30 December 2005, the main suspect Sun Wei released a statement proclaiming her innocence, which was confirmed by a weekly newspaper, Qingnian Zhoumo after interviewing Sun Wei's father in 2006.

According to the statement, the suspect was identified as the only student with official access to thallium in her experiment for undergraduate research. She was detained by the police department on 2 April 1997, and signed a statement acknowledging that she was a suspect. Sun Wei's family retrieved her from the police after eight hours of interrogation. In her statement, she also claimed that, according to the law, she was cleared as a suspect in August 1998. However, in a Morning News Post report dated March 2006, Zhu Ling's lawyer, Zhang Jie said of the suspect, "She was only exempted from the compulsory measures that she was subjected to as a suspect at that time, but not excluded from suspicion."

Internet discussion of the crime has continued since then, and has frequently become a hot topic on major online Chinese communities as a high-profile unsolved case. A hacker who claimed to have hacked into the email account of one of Sun Wei's classmates, revealed communications purporting to be between Sun and several of her classmates, showing Sun Wei was guiding them on how to post on forums to declare her innocence and that they were preparing for Sun's statement in 2005. Among the Internet users in the discussion, many people speculate that the main suspect has not been charged due to her family connections. Sun Wei's grandfather is Sun Yueqi, who was an important member of Chinese People's Political Consultative Conference as a senior leader of Revolutionary Committee of the Chinese Kuomintang; and her first cousin once removed, Sun Fuling, was deputy mayor of Beijing from 1983 to 1993 and Vice Chairperson of the Chinese People's Political Consultative Conference from 1998 to 2003.

=== 2013 White House petition ===
An online White House Petition on the whitehouse.gov website was created on 3 May 2013, demanding investigation of the major suspect who was believed to be living in the United States at the time. The number of the signatures reached its 100,000 goal three days after it was created. This online campaign also drew great attention from U.S. and Chinese mainstream media towards Zhu Ling's family and the cold case.

On 28 July 2015, the White House declined to comment on the petition's request, saying that "Zhu Ling's poisoning in 1995 was a tragedy. No young person deserves to suffer as she has, and we can understand the heartbreak of those close to her. We decline, however, to comment on the specific request in your petition. As the We the People Terms of Participation explain, to 'avoid the appearance of improper influence, the White House may decline to address certain procurement, law enforcement, adjudicatory, or similar matters properly within the jurisdiction of federal departments or agencies, federal courts, or state and local government.'"

=== 2023-2024 Australian Parliament petition ===
In 2023, some Chinese Australians petitioned the Australian Parliament to expel "Jasmine Sun" (formerly known as Sun Wei), who was believed to have settled in the country. Legal experts believe that the petition has no legal basis and that someone can only be deported because they submitted false documents during the settlement application process. This petition was launched on change.org and has received nearly 50,000 signatures as of January 2024.

In January 2024, The Australian disclosed Sun Wei's recent situation, saying that Sun Wei had changed her name to Jasmine Sun, lived in Port Stephens, New South Wales, and was a real estate investor.

== Later life and death ==
Following her poisoning, Zhu did not recover. Her eyesight, mental capacity, and senses were in a permanently degraded condition. In an interview with Yangcheng Evening News, Zhu's parents revealed that she had to be hospitalized at least once a year following the poisoning. Following a flu in 2011, Zhu was hospitalized for ten months. The flu caused a lung infection, resulting in her only being able to eat liquid food from then on.

On 18 November 2023, Zhu began to experience symptoms of a brain tumor, with a fever of 39 °C (102 °F), and fell into a severe coma. She died on 22 December 2023, at the age of 50.

== Significance ==
Widespread awareness among the Chinese public, alongside cynicism regarding the matter and the alleged whitewashing of the case, pose public relations problems for the government of the People's Republic of China. Information regarding the matter is too widespread to suppress, but, at the same time, evidence adequate to establish the guilt or innocence of the primary suspect is most likely unavailable. Thus, the matter serves as a vehicle for the expression of public dissatisfaction with corruption and abuse of power by the political elite associated with the regime.
