= Gao Zhentong =

Chinese scientist (1928–2025)

- 高镇同
- Born: 15 November 1928; Beiping, China
- Died: 21 January 2025 (aged 96); Beijing, China
- Education: Peiyang University
- Scientific career
- Fields: Structural fatigue
- Workplaces: Beihang University

Chinese name
- Simplified Chinese: 高镇同
- Traditional Chinese: 高鎮同
Transcriptions
Standard Mandarin
- Hanyu Pinyin: Gāo Zhèntóng

Gao Zhentong (Chinese: 高镇同; 15 November 1928 – 21 January 2025) was a Chinese scientist specializing in structural fatigue, and an academician of the Chinese Academy of Sciences.

== Life and career ==
Gao was born in Beiping (now Beijing), on 15 November 1928, while his ancestral home is in Duchang County, Jiangxi. In 1946, he enrolled at Peiyang University (now Tianjin University), where he majored in the Department of Aeronautics.

After graduation in 1950, Gao became a teaching assistant at Tsinghua University and moved to Beihang University in 1952. He joined the Chinese Communist Party (CCP) in 1986.

Gao died in Beijing on 21 January 2025, at the age of 96.

== Publication ==
- 疲劳性能试验设计和数据处理 [Fatigue Performance Test Design and Data Processing] (in Chinese). Beijing: Beihang University Press. 1999. ISBN 9787810128612.

== Honours and awards ==
- 1991 Member of the Chinese Academy of Sciences (CAS)
- 1999 Science and Technology Progress Award of the Ho Leung Ho Lee Foundation
