= Sayers, Allport & Potter =

Pharmaceutical firm in Sydney, Australia

Sayers, Allport & Potter, later Sayers, Allport Proprietary, was an Australian wholesale pharmaceutical and veterinary supply business based in Sydney, whose principal market was the pastoral and agricultural industries of New South Wales. They were particularly known, or notorious, for two products: S.A.P., a phosphorus-based poison aimed at combating the rabbit pest, and Thall-Rat, a thallium-based poison used against rats. Another similar product manufactured was Thall-Ant.

== History ==
The company was formed in 1890 by two brothers, Roland Allport and Robert Knight Allport as "Sayers and Allport", and joined the following year by Andrew L. Potter. "Sayers" may have been a silent partner, or an entire fiction. Their first office was at 297 George Street, Sydney, and moved to 10–12 Hunter Street, Sydney around the time Potter became a partner. Potter left the business around 1902, but his name was still connected with the firm until late 1912. Later H.E. (Doc) Taylor joined and the Company was known as Sayers, Allport and Taylor until his death in 1945. They moved from 9 O'Connell Street, Sydney to 53–55 Macquarie Street, Sydney in 1912, and was still there when the company was purchased by International Products Ltd. in 1948.

== Products ==
Products supplied to agriculturists over the years included instruments such as "Sayers" brand drench guns, castrating and tailing instruments, cattle syringes and needles. Chemicals marketed in the 1940s and 1950s included drench compounds "Blue-Nik" (copper sulphate and nicotine, indicated for large stomach worms, hair worms and black scour worms), "Green Seal" (carbon tetrachloride, for use against worms and liver fluke), and "Phenmix" (phenothiazine, for stomach and intestinal worms). Other products marketed were "Barconite" for treating "fly-blow" in sheep. Few of these materials would today be available or recommended for the use prescribed.

S.A.P.

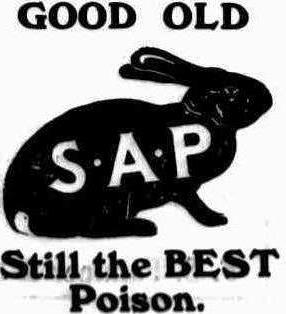
Advertisement for SAP rabbit poison

In 1902 the company began marketing this poison, which was, where laid, spectacularly successful against the rabbit pest. In 1906 the company purchased the recipe and manufacturing rights for "Rabbo", a similar product, from G. McGirr of Parkes, New South Wales. An active ingredient of "S.A.P." was phosphorus, and was quickly suspected of starting grass fires, such that competing products such as "Vernox" were soon being marketed as being safer in this respect, though "Vernox" and others such as "Deathtrail" and "Grim" all contained free phosphorus, in perhaps different concentrations. The advantage of phosphorus as a poison is that, in dry weather and if not strewn as clumps, it degrades to innocuous phosphoric acid within a week and is harmless to stock.

Thall-Rat

The active compound in this rat poison was thallium sulfate, imported from Germany. Its advantages as a rodenticide, that it was odorless and practically tasteless and swift acting, were also realised by amateur poisoners; it was also inexpensive, required no licence to purchase, gave symptoms similar to known diseases, and one gram was sufficient to despatch a human. Its one disadvantage in this application was that it did not degrade, and could easily be detected many years post mortem. After a spate of such poisonings in Sydney in the early 1950s, given due prominence in the Australian press, and the exhumation of more suspected victims, its ready sale was prohibited.

== The founders ==
Roland Allport (1870 - 2 May 1946) managing director, with his brother Robert founded the firm in 1890. Their brother Dr Alfred Allport (1867 - 1949) was a surgeon and English international Rugby Union player, who cofounded St Paul's Hospital, London. Roland's sons R(oland) Bret Allport (c. January 1894–1946 ) and Jack Manning Allport MM (c. June 1895 – 20 Feb 1978), a motor mechanic, enlisted with the 1st AIF and served overseas. Jack was released in 1917 to serve with the Royal Flying Corps and was awarded the Military Cross, while Roland reached the rank of Lieutenant with the 3rd Infantry Battalion.

Robert Knight Allport (c. 1861 – 5 July 1933) was born in London and came out to Sydney around 1885.

Other interests
- Chamber of Commerce committee member
- Chamber of Manufactures committee member
- Millions Club committee member
- Manufacturers' Mutual Insurance, Ltd., director
- Pure Food Act, advisory committee member
- Boy Scouts' Association, central executive

His son Dr. Robert M. Allport was a medical doctor in Gulgong NSW.

Andrew L. Potter (c. 1862 – 29 June 1928) was born in Surrey and emigrated to Sydney around 1888. He was noted for his athletic physique and in his youth was a cricketer, footballer, cyclist and golfer. He resigned from the firm to return to England, but did not remain there long, and returned to Sydney, where he joined with pharmacist G. Keith Birks to found the firm of Potter & Birks Ltd. in 1904. He retired from that company in 1916. He never married. He was a brother of James W. Potter, of the English shipowners Birt, Potter and Hughes.
