= Sun Yueqi =

Chinese industrialist and political figure (1893-1995)

- 孙越崎
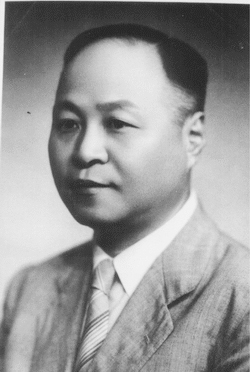
- Born: Sun Yuqi (孙毓麒); 16 October 1893; Shaoxing County, Shaoxing Prefecture, Zhejiang, Qing Empire
- Died: 9 December 1995 (aged 102); Shijingshan, Beijing, China
- Education: National Peiyang University; Peking University; Stanford University; Columbia University
- Occupations: Industrialist, politician
- Years active: 1919–1995
- Spouses: Ge Caixiang (m. 1912; died 1922) Wang Yimeng (m. 1926)

Sun Yueqi (simplified Chinese: 孙越崎; traditional Chinese: 孫越崎, 16 October 1893 – 9 December 1995), formerly known as Sun Yuqi or Sun Shifen, was an industrialist and politician in the Republic of China and later the People's Republic of China. He led the surveys and developments of several coal mines and oil fields in China, such as the Yanchang and Yumen Oilfields.

In 1946, Sun was the vice chairman of the National Resources Commission under the Nationalist government. During his term, he presided over the survey and mapping of the Three Gorges Project by American hydraulic engineer John L. Savage.

== Early life ==
On 16 October 1893, Sun was born in an ordinary family in Tongkang Village, Shaoxing County, Zhejiang. His original name was "Sun Yuqi" (Chinese: 孙毓麒). His father was Sun Yanchang (Chinese: 孙延昌), with the courtesy name Yantang (Chinese: 燕堂). Being a xiucai, Sun Yanchang left home for Heilongjiang in 1905, where he served as a local official and later the manager of a gold mine.

At the age of 17, Sun Yuqi was admitted to Shaoxing Jianyi Normal School (Chinese: 绍兴简易师范学校) and graduated at the end of 1911. In accordance with the official policy at the time, he taught in a primary school for a year on voluntary duty. During this time, he married Ge Caixiang (Chinese: 葛采湘) under an arranged marriage deal made in their childhoods by their parents. In 1913, Sun enrolled in the Middle School Department of Fudan Public School in Shanghai, where he got to know political activists like Shao Lizi, Luo Jialun and Yu Dawei. In May 1915, angered by Yuan Shikai's acceptance of the Twenty-One Demands proposed by the Japanese government, Sun changed his name to "Yueqi" (Chinese: 越崎; lit. 'Overcome ruggedness'). After graduating in 1916, Sun studied under the Liberal Arts Preparatory Department in Beiyang University. Under persuasion from his father, Sun transferred to the Mining and Metallurgy Department later the same year.

== May Fourth Movement ==
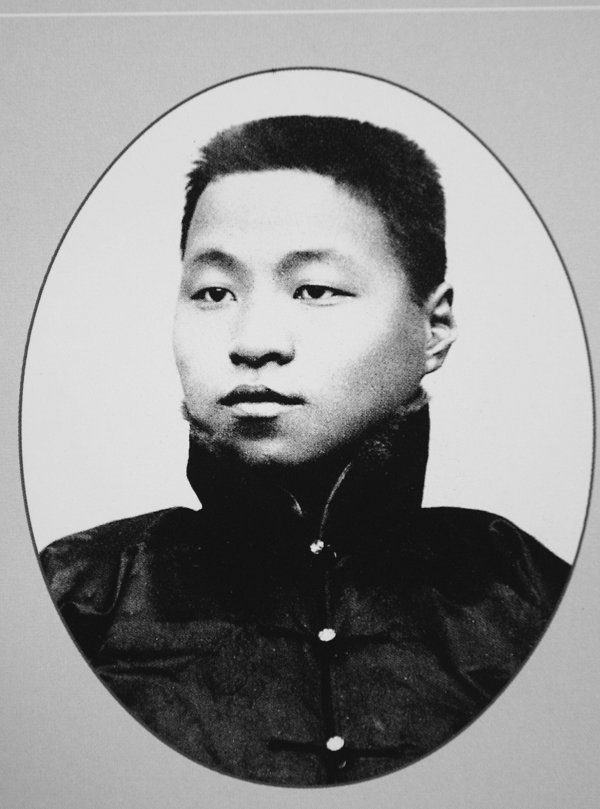
Sun Yueqi in his youth

In 1919, the May Fourth Movement broke out in Beijing, and student representatives from several schools in Tianjin held a secret meeting to discuss methods of supporting the movement. Sun attended the meeting as the president of Beiyang University Student Union, and was the first to propose holding protests in support of the students in Beijing. Sun also participated in the establishments of the Union of Tianjin Students (Chinese: 天津学生联合会). On 4 June, while the students in Tianjin were holding a demonstration in Nankai University, representatives of the students, including Sun Yueqi, Ma Jun, Chen Zhidu and Sha Zhupei, went to negotiate with Cao Rui, the then Governor of Zhili Province. They demanded the governor to send a telegram to Beiyang government, requesting the release of the arrested students in Beijing and rejection of the Treaty of Versailles. The Beiyang government relented and accepted the students' petition.

Following the end of the demonstration, which lasted for three months, Sun and many other students were expelled from Beiyang University for their participation in the protest. With assistance from Cai Yuanpei, Sun enrolled in the Mining Department of Peking University, and graduated in 1921 with a bachelor's degree in engineering. After graduation, Sun Yueqi returned to Shaoxing to recuperate for two years, during which his wife Ge Caixiang died of illness.

== Early career ==
In the autumn of 1923, Sun went to Northeast China to inspect several industrial sites, including Fushun Coal Mine, Benxi Coal Mine and Anshan Steel Works. In early 1924, Chinese and Russian authorities jointly established the Muling Coal Mine Company (Chinese: 穆棱煤矿公司). At the invitation of its supervisor Cai Yunsheng, Sun went to participate in the creation of Muling Coal Mine, where he was appointed as the chief of the Chinese Mining Department as well as the chief of the Machinery and Engineering Department. He led the operations in digging the No. 2 vertical shaft. The mine became operational in October.

In 1926, with introduction from his father's friend Xu Zihou and Wang Yunzhi, Sun met and later married Wang Yimeng (Chinese: 王仪孟). A year later, he met the director of Beijing Institute of Geological Survey (Chinese: 北京地质调查所) Weng Wenhao, who introduced Sun to the Geological Society of China as well as the Mining and Metallurgical Engineering Society of China.

In early 1929, Weng offered Sun the position of Chief Engineer of Jingxing Coal Mine in Hebei, but Sun turned down the job as he was preparing to study in the United States. In August, Sun enrolled in the Mining Department of Stanford University. He did not obtain a master's degree, instead only studied postgraduate courses. During his study, Sun also inspected gold mines in San Francisco as well as oil mines in Los Angeles and Houston. In September 1931, he transferred to Graduate School in Columbia University, and inspected coal mines across the eastern United States in the meantime. On his way back to China in the spring of 1932, he took a detour through Europe, spending about 40 days inspecting the mining industries in United Kingdom, France and Germany. In July, he returned to his home in Harbin through the Soviet Union. He did not want to reside in Manchukuo under Japanese occupation, so after 20 days he and his family moved to Beiping (the name of Beijing from 1928 to 1949), which at the time was under the rule of the Nationalist government.

== Public career ==
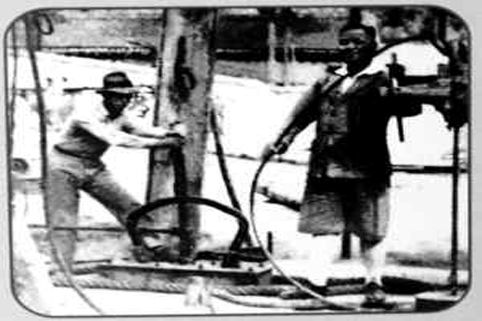
Sun Yueqi (right) in the Yanchang Oilfield

In November, Sun went to Nanjing at the invitation of Weng Wenhao and served as commissioner and director of mining chamber in the newly established National Defense Planning Commission. In March 1933, he investigated and published a report on the coal resources along Jinpu Railway. In September of the same year, Sun was sent to Shaanxi to inspect for oil along with Yan Shuang. In the spring of 1934, after learning of the existence of oil resource in Northern Shaanxi, the National Defense Planning Commission established Northern Shaanxi Oilfield Exploration Division (Chinese: 陕北油矿勘探处), with Sun as the director. In Yanchang County, Sun assembled China's first oil drilling team and directed the team's operations in constructing oil derricks and refining gasoline.

In September, Chiang Kai-shek appointed Weng Wenhao as Organization Commissioner to oversee the reorganization of Zhongfu Company (Chinese: 中福公司), a coal company in Henan that recently came under the control of Military Affairs Commission. Weng invited Sun to serve as the chief engineer of Zhongfu Company, and acting commissioner in Weng's absence. Under their leadership, Zhongfu Company began operating at a profit again in 1935, with an annual anthracite coal production of 1.5 million tons. In October, Sun took the role of Organization Commissioner. At the end of 1936, the control of Zhongfu Company was returned to its previous board of directors, and in the first board meeting Sun was appointed as the Chief Executive Officer with a term of three years.

== Second Sino-Japanese War ==
Following the Marco Polo Bridge Incident in 1937, Sun decided to relocate the equipment of Zhongfu Coal Mine to Sichuan. He persuaded the directors who originally opposed to the relocation, and moved most of the coal mine equipment to Sichuan through Hankou. Zhongfu Coal Mine became the only modern coal mine successfully relocated to Sichuan during the Second Sino-Japanese War. With the relocated equipment, Sun founded four coal mining companies (Tianfu, Jiayang, Weiyuan and Shiyan) in cooperation with Chongqing Minsheng Industry Company, National Resources Commission, General Administration of Salt Affairs and banking industry in Sichuan. He also established the Fourth Mine Joint Corporation in Chongqing and served as its chief executive officer. In 1938, he officially joined the Nationalist Party of China.

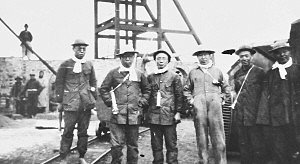
Sun Yueqi (3rd from right) in Yumen Oilfield

In March 1941, the Gansu Oil Mine Bureau (Chinese: 甘肃油矿局) was formed in Chongqing under the management of National Resources Commission, with Sun appointed as the general manager. Tasked with building an oil mine in Yumen, the bureau completed construction of Yumen Oilfield in 1942, with annual production of 1.8 million gallons of gasoline in that year. The success in Yumen earned Sun the nickname "King of Coal and Oil" (Chinese: 煤油大王). In August, Chiang Kai-shek and Hu Zongnan inspected the Yumen Oilfield. The Chinese Society of Engineers awarded Sun the "Golden Engineering Medal" for his accomplishment. At the Sixth National Congress of the Nationalist Party of China held in May 1945, he was elected as an alternate member of the Central Executive Committee.

== Chinese Civil War ==
After the end of World War II, Sun resigned from his position in the Fourth Mine Joint Corporation and the Gansu Oil Mine Bureau in the spring of 1946. As the Special Commissioner for the Northeast Region of the Ministry of Economic Affairs of Executive Yuan, he was sent to Shenyang to supervise the transfer of control of the heavy industries in Northeastern China to the Nationalist government. At the same time, Sun Yueqi also served as the director of Enemy Industry Processing Bureau of Pingjin District in Hebei, with office located in Beiping. Sun had to travel constantly between Beiping and Shenyang for his roles.

In January, Sun served as the deputy chairman of the National Resources Commission. In May, the National Resources Commission was changed to be directly administered by the Executive Yuan, with Sun serving as vice chairman. In January 1947, Sun resigned from his posts in Enemy Industry Processing Bureau and Ministry of Economic Affairs, and moved to Nanjing to serve as the chairman of Resources Committee of the Executive Yuan. In May, the Weng Wenhao Cabinet was established, and Sun was also appointed as the Political Affairs Councilor.

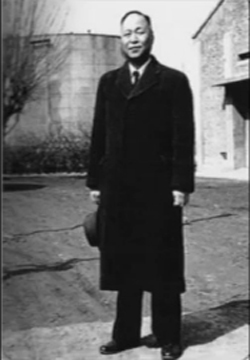
Sun Yueqi around 1949

In July, Sun was tasked with inspection of industrial and mining enterprises affiliated with the National Resources Commission in Northern and Northeastern China. He was reportedly pessimistic about the current condition of the Nationalist Party. In October 1948, Sun convened a secret meeting with the leaders of industrial and mining enterprising in Nanjing, where he proposed the mobilization of all available workers and miners to protect the industrial assets from destruction in the war.

Following the Huaihai campaign, the Nationalist government lost control over most of Northern China. By the end of December, Chiang Kai-shek ordered Sun to demolish five factories in Nanjing and relocate the equipment to Taiwan. On 21 January 1949, Chiang Kai-shek announced his resignation as the President of the Republic of China. Around this time, Sun ordered the assets of demolished factories to be returned to and reinstalled in their original sites. When Chiang was in Fenghua District of Ningbo, he twice ordered Tang Enbo to send telegrams to Sun, demanding the immediate demolition and relocation of factories to Taiwan. Sun, with the support of acting president Li Zongren, refused to carry out the orders on the grounds that it would be detrimental to the peace talks held at the time.

On 26 April, Sun flew from Shanghai to Guangzhou, and upon arrival he sent telegrams to 50 people in charge of factories and mines in South Central, Southwestern and Northwestern China to meet in Guangzhou. He distributed a total of US$1,500,000 (equivalent to $20,297,203 in 2025) to them as reserve funds for paying employees during emergency. By the end of May, he resigned from his posts and arrived in Hong Kong, where he contacted Chinese Communist Party and received invitation to Peiping from Zhou Enlai. Sun declined the invitation and contacted the Foreign Trade Office (Chinese: 国外贸易事务所) of the National Resources Committee in Hong Kong. At the time, Foreign Trade Office kept tungsten, antimony, tin, mercury and other minerals in storage, with an estimated worth of US$6,000,000 (equivalent to $81,188,811 in 2025). Under the leadership of local branch of CCP, Sun instigated the employees of the office to organize and resist orders from Ministry of Economic Affairs about the relocation of the mineral resources. On 14 November, the Foreign Trade Office officially declare allegiance to the Communist government.

In March 1950, the Nationalist Party revoked Sun's party membership, and the Nationalist government issued a warrant on Sun for treason against the party and state. The National Resources Committee was the only department among the central ministries that had organized protection of property when the Nationalist government withdrew to Taiwan. In 1950 the committee administered over 121 companies, with nearly a thousand production units and about 32,000 employees. All of the personnel and assets remained in the mainland were acquired by the Communist government. Two former chairmen of the committee, Weng Wenhao and Qian Changzhao, later returned to China at the invitation of Sun.

== Under new regime ==
On 4 November 1949, Sun and his family returned to Beijing from Hong Kong by boat. The Nationalist government sent four warships in an attempt to intercept Sun, but failed due to his ship changing course. Upon his arrival, Sun was appointed the deputy director of the Planning Bureau of Financial and Economic Committee. In March 1950, he joined the Revolutionary Committee of the Chinese Kuomintang with introduction from Shao Lizi. Under Chen Yun's advice, Sun drafted an editorial titled No construction without engineering design (Chinese: 没有工程设计就不能施工) and published in the 16 June 1951 issue of the People's Daily. In 1952, during the Three-anti Campaign launched by the CCP, he and other key personnel of the original National Resources Committee were detained and put under investigation. His old friend Lu Zuofu committed suicide during the Five-anti Campaign launched at the same time, and the news of the death reportedly overwhelmed him.

During the restructure of government agencies in June, the Financial and Economic Committee of the Government Affairs Council was abolished along with other committees, and the cadres were re-assigned to other positions. When filling out his application form, Sun Yueqi wrote "willing to work in the field of coal mining". He was assigned to Kailuan Coal Mine in Tangshan, the then largest mine in China, as the third deputy director of the General Management Office. From 1952 to 1959, he personally directed field operations in the coal mine and was well received by the employees. He also put forward many suggestions for improving production and strengthening safety measures, but due to lack of real power his suggestions failed to attract the attention of the leadership. When Premier Zhou Enlai went to Tangshan for an inspection, he visited Sun and arranged for Sun to work in Beijing. Sun accompanied the visiting British delegation led by the leader of Labour Party Clement Attlee to inspect the Kailuan Coal Mine.

As the Cultural Revolution was launched in May 1966, Sun was living at his daughter's home in Beijing, and since he did not have his household registered in Beijing he was deported to Tangshan. He was removed from his official positions and detained for over a year on the charge of "special suspicion". During this period, he had undergone more than 600 interrogations concerning his tenure in the former National Resources Committee. His house was searched, and he was sent to work in penal labor. His wife Wang Yimeng suffered from schizophrenia due to treatments from the Red Guards and attempted suicide twice. The couple were forced to move to a small bungalow in Tangshan.

Sun was released in 1973. After receiving the suspended wages from the past five years, which totaled to about 10,000 yuan, he and his wife spent three years traveling throughout mainland China twice. Shortly after returning to Tangshan, a major earthquake struck Tangshan and the couple were buried in the ruins of their own house. They were rescued by their neighbors and sent to Beijing for treatment by their daughter. When Zhou Enlai's widow Deng Yingchao learned of this, she sent a health doctor to visit and provide help. After Sun was discharged from hospital, Deng contacted the director of the Beijing Revolutionary Committee Wu De to help with Sun's household registration and housing needs.

In 1979, Sun served as the vice chairman of Hebei Provincial Committee of the Chinese People's Political Consultative Conference as well as the deputy director of the Hebei Provincial People's Congress Standing Committee. In 1980, he was elected as a member of the Standing Committee of the Fifth National Chinese People's Political Consultative Conference. In 1981, Sun Yueqi served as a consultant to the Ministry of Coal Industry. He also served as a special consultant to the Import and Export Administration Commission and a special consultant to the Ministry of Foreign Economic Relations and Trade, during which time he met Jiang Zemin, then deputy director of the Import and Export Administration Commission.

On 9 December 1995, Sun died of illness in Beijing at the age of 102.
