= Prussian blue (medical use) =

Dark blue pigment used as a medication

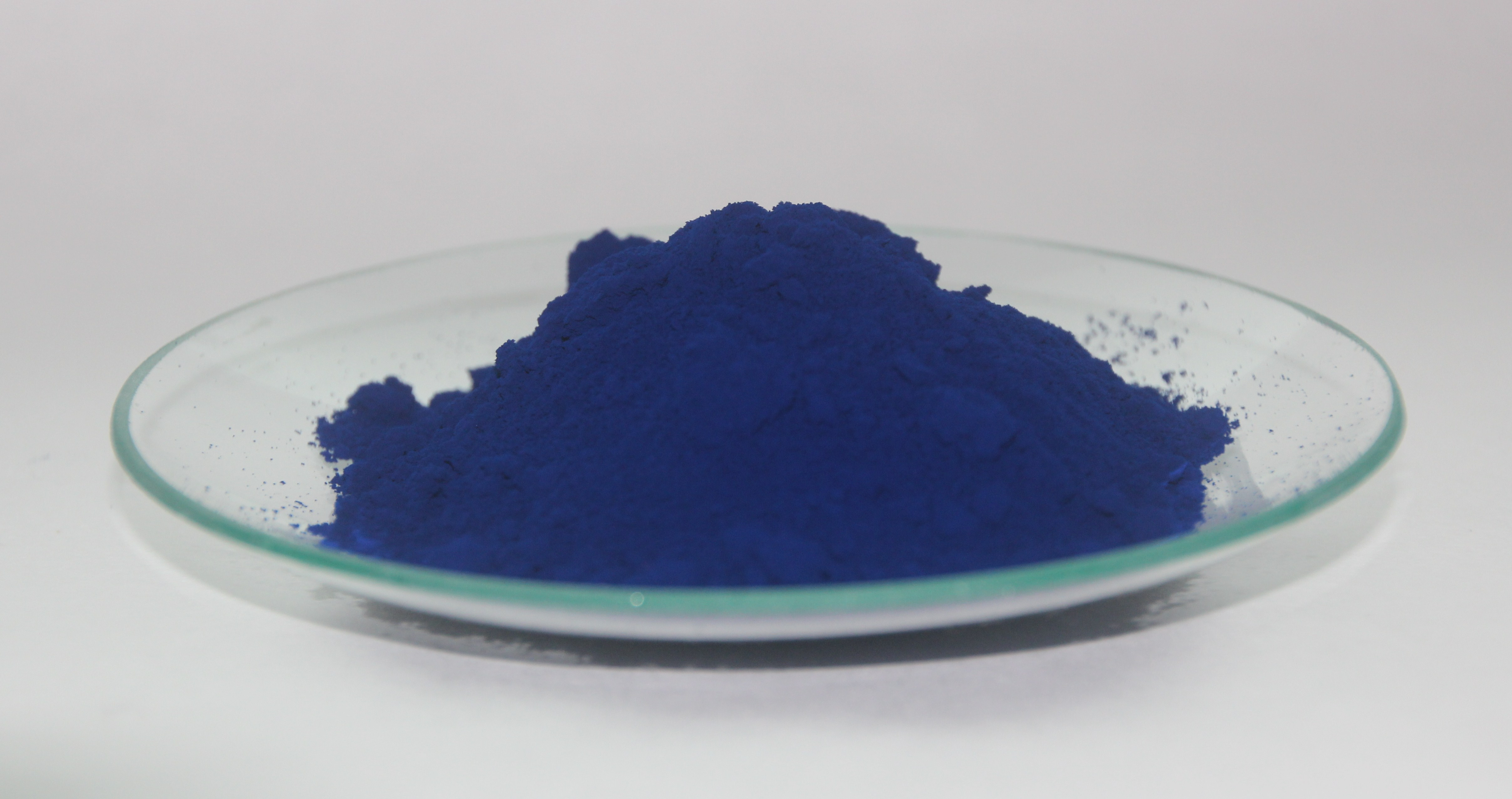
- Prussian blue

Clinical data
- Trade names: Radiogardase, others
- AHFS/Drugs.com: Monograph
- Routes of administration: by mouth
- ATC code: V03AB31 (WHO)

Identifiers
- CAS Number: 25869-98-1
- PubChem CID: 2724251
- ChemSpider: 146359
- UNII: K2CJI135MU

Chemical and physical data
- Formula: KFe[Fe(CN)_{6}]
- Molar mass: 859.24

Prussian blue, also known as potassium ferric hexacyanoferrate, is used as a medication to treat thallium poisoning or radioactive caesium poisoning. For thallium it may be used in addition to gastric lavage, activated charcoal, forced diuresis, and hemodialysis. It is given by mouth or nasogastric tube. Prussian blue is also used in the urine to test for G6PD deficiency.

Side effects may include constipation, low blood potassium, and stools that are dark. With long-term use, sweat may turn blue. It mainly works by trapping the toxic monovalent cations in its crystal lattice after ion-exchange with potassium or ammonium cations and thus preventing the absorption of thallium and radio-caesium from the intestines.

Prussian blue was developed around 1706. It is on the World Health Organization's List of Essential Medicines. As of 2016, it is only approved for medical use in Germany, the United States, and Japan. Access to medical-grade Prussian blue can be difficult in many areas of the world including the developed world.

== Medical uses ==
Prussian blue is used to treat thallium poisoning or radioactive caesium poisoning. It may also be used for exposure to radioactive material until the underlying type is determined.

Often it is given with mannitol or sorbitol to increase the speed with which it moves through the intestines.

Prussian blue is also used to detect hemosiderin in urine to confirm a diagnosis of G6PD deficiency.

=== Thallium poisoning ===
For thallium it may be used in addition to gastric lavage, forced diuresis, and hemodialysis.

It is given until the amount of thallium in the urine drops to below 0.5 mg per day.

=== Caesium poisoning ===
It is specifically only used for radioactive caesium poisoning when the caesium has entered the body either by swallowing or breathing it in.
