= Yuyu =

Yuyu, Yu Yu, or variant may refer to:

== People ==
=== Chinese ===
- Xia Gui (1195-1224), also known as "Yüyü", Chinese landscape painter
- Peggy Yu or Yu Yu (born 1965), Chinese businesswoman

=== Egyptian ===
- Yuyu (High Priest of Osiris), Egyptian New Kingdom priest
- Yuya or Yuyu (i i w i A A1), Egyptian New Kingdom courtier

=== Japanese ===
- Kiryū Yūyū (Japanese: 桐生悠々; 1873–1941), Japanese journalist and activist
- Ran Yu-Yu (輝優優), Japanese pro wrestler

=== Others ===
- Yuyu Sutisna (born 1962), 22nd Chief of Staff of the Air Force Indonesian Army
- Ma Yu-yu (马友友, 馬友友), American cellist of Chinese descent

== Other uses ==
- Yû Yû, Japanese animanga
- Yuyu language, extinct Australian Aboriginal language
- Iota Cancri, a star with the modern name Yuyu

== See also ==
- Yueyu, the Cantonese Chinese
- Yueyue (disambiguation)
- Yuyue (disambiguation)
