= Yuyue (disambiguation) =

Yuyue, or Yue, was an ancient Chinese kingdom during the Spring and Autumn and Warring States periods.

Yuyue or Yu Yue may refer to:

- Zhu Yuyue, Prince of Tang (died 1647), Emperor Shaowu of the Southern Ming dynasty
- Yelü Xiuge or Yuyue (于越) (died 998), Khitan general from the Liao dynasty
- Yuyue (鱼跃体), a style of Tibetan calligraphy
- Yuyue (禹越镇), a town in Zhejiang, see List of township-level divisions of Zhejiang
- Yuyue (鱼岳镇), a town in Hubei, see List of township-level divisions of Hubei
- Yu Yue (俞樾) (1821–1907), Chinese scholar during the Qing dynasty

== See also ==
- Yueyu
- Yueyue (disambiguation)
- Yuyu (disambiguation)
