= Tianya Club =

Former Chinese bulletin board system

Tianya
- Website type: Internet forum
- Available in: Chinese
- Website: www.tianya.cn
- Commercial: Yes
- Launched: 14 February 1999; 27 years ago

Tianya Club (Chinese: 天涯社区; pinyin: Tiānyá Shèqū; lit. 'Edge of the World Community') is an Internet forum that was one of the most popular in China. As of 2015, it was ranked by Alexa as the 11th most visited site in the People's Republic of China and 60th overall. It was founded on 14 February 1999 and provided BBS, blog, microblog and photo album services.

Politicians have used Tianya Club to campaign, answer questions from constituents, and gather grassroots support.

The website went offline on 26 April 2023. It resumed operations on 2 June 2026.

== Notable incidents ==
Tianya Club has been involved in Chinese news stories such as a revival of the 1995 Tsinghua University poisoning story about Zhu Ling.

- Tianya Club was the progenitor of the Hanxin hoax and was involved in the exposure of the 2007 Chinese slave scandal. Tianya Club is also famous for its social search, nicknamed the "human flesh search engine" (Renrou Sousuo, meaning "human flesh search" literally, extended to "by hand" or "not computer aided"). For example, during January 2008 of Edison Chen photo scandal, the Tianya Club users searched out and identified the woman involved, based on a silhouette in a newspaper.
- Xiao Yueyue: Viral Marketing campaigns. In an effort to promote Tianya ahead of its IPO, writer Xu Jiayi (a novelist and fourth-year University of Shanghai drama student who volunteered at the 2010 Shanghai Expo) concocted an elaborate account of a "stupendous girl's" National Day vacation adventure to the Expo.

== See also ==
- 4chan
- Futaba Channel
- 2channel
- Microblogging in China
