= Little Moon Moon =

Chinese hoax internet celebrity

Little Moon Moon (小月月, Xiao Yue Yue) was a Chinese internet celebrity in 2010; however she was suspected to be a fake person and part of a Chinese internet publicity stunt organized by Tianya Forum. As the main character of a post named "I thank this obnoxious friend for bringing me such a dismal National Day" composed by Chinese netizen Rong Rong on Tianya, "Little Moon Moon went from the Internet into reality, becoming famous all over." She is described as fat, crazy and obnoxious by the author. Since Little Moon Moon was portrayed as an unbelievable, shocking, annoying and obnoxious woman, and the posts were written during the seven-day National Day vacation in China, she became an overnight sensation. Nevertheless, after investigation, Little Moon Moon turned out to be a fake person composed by writer Xu Jiayi to maintain the shrinking influence of Tianya forum.

== Event overview ==
On the morning on October 5, 2010, at 11:45 a netizen started posting diary entries on the Tianya forum with the ID "Rong Rong". The series of live updates recorded an astonishing story of Little Moon Moon (Rong Rong's high school classmate) and her boyfriend's visit to Shanghai Expo during the National Day holiday, with Rong Rong being their host showing them around, and along the journey, endless miserable and crazy things happened (such as Little Moon Moon's self-suicide farce, singing weird poetry, etc.). The writer used tons of words to describe how she was completely "astounded/superfied" by Little Moon Moon during the two days and one night. Rong Rong stopped posting on October 13 with sentences like "I went out to deal with some things", and "I don’t know if this post will reach an ending on this day."

The humorous and absurd story quickly drew numerous attention. Within two days, the post had over 17 million views and over 57 thousand comments over 564 pages. As for Weibo (the Chinese version of Twitter), the topic of Little Moon Moon was already ranked number 3, with 17293 tweets in that day, more than any other hot topic of the week. At first, netizens thought the incident and the people described in the posts were real, however they came to suggest that there must be a publicity team behind the scenes to stir such a huge wave on the Internet.

Netizens even created pages for Little Moon Moon at the Baidu Encyclopedia and the Baidu Post Bar as well as study group, human flesh search/cyber hunting group, and a comic version.

== Reflection and introspection ==
In apparent contrast with Little Moon Moon's profile, which was portrayed as an ugly kindergarten teacher who is 150 cm tall and 80 kilograms in weight, the real writer behind the whole event was a sophomore student at Shanghai Normal University. Although she claimed that every word she wrote was real, it was revealed as a publicity stunt. "Insiders disclosed that Tianya is currently preparing to go public on the stock market, and is under pressure for its declining influence, and thus urgently needed a major incident to raise its influence, which is how "Little Moon Moon" happened. Since this was a topic the forum Tianya itself launched, one where there is no obvious commercial goal, where the language matched the tastes of the netizen masses, successfully attracting netizen eyeballs, having achieved a large effect with little effort." The live broadcast posts were designed to be the warming-up phase of the publicity stunt, with the climax point uncovering a real life version of "Little Moon Moon", who is a writer. By using this huge contrast, Tianya planned to arouse a bigger controversy, thus allowing netizens to participate and making the Little Moon Moon to become a continuing internet topic.
