= National Resources Commission =

Republic of China Government Body 1932–1952

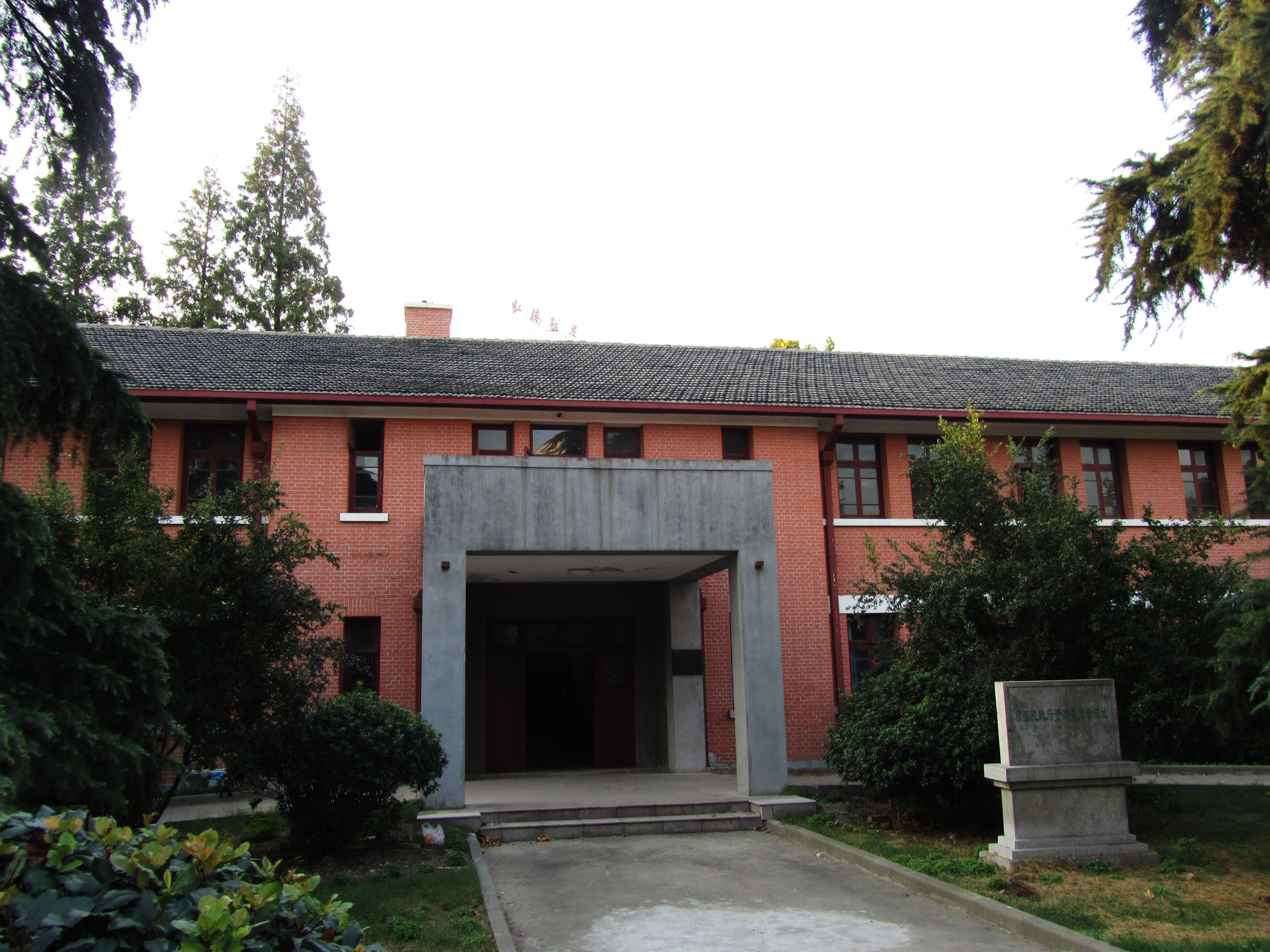
The former site of the National Government Resource Committee located in Nanjing University of Technology.

The National Resources Commission (Chinese: 國家資源委員會; pinyin: guójiā zīyuán wěiyuánhuì) was a powerful organ of the Executive Yuan of the Republic of China that existed from 1932 to 1952 and was responsible for industrial development and the management of public enterprises. It was staffed entirely by technocrats who reported directly to the Nationalist leader Chiang Kai-shek. The significance of the National Resources Commission stemmed from the leading role it played in industrial development during the two decades of Kuomintang "tutelage" over China.

The National Resources Commission was originally formed as the National Defense Planning Commission (國防設計委員會) in 1932 in Nanjing with a staff of fifty technical experts to plan industrial mobilization in preparation for the Second Sino-Japanese War. The immediate catalyst for the formation of the National Defense Planning Commission was the Japanese invasion of Manchuria in 1931. The Commission was headed by Weng Wenhao.

Its immediate goal was to design and implement defense-related industries to make China self-sufficient in impending war with Japan.

The National Defense Planning Commission was renamed the National Resources Commission in 1935 to reflect its role beyond defense-related industries. It soon grew into a large bureaucracy that was involved in managing a large state-owned industrial sector and in coordinating foreign trade. By 1947, it had a staff of 33,000 who supervised 230,000 workers, mostly in public enterprises. Due mainly to the nationalization of major industries by the Nationalist Government, the NRC ultimately gained control of 70% of Chinese industry.

The Commission was particularly interested in surveying and exploiting natural minerals and ores, and succeeded in importing entire industrial plants and sending its personnel to train abroad. Its engineers were influenced by Sun Yat-sen's Industrial Development and tied the need for economic "reconstruction" with national defense. The NRC moved major industries into the Chinese interior when the Nationalist Government under Chiang Kai-shek retreated to Chongqing. To supply the government-controlled areas with electricity, the NRC proposed to build the Three Gorges Dam (the National Defense Planning Commission had made the first engineering survey of the site in 1932), though the project would not come to fruition until the 1990s.

In 1938, the NRC discovered the Yumen oil field.

After the defeat of Japan in the Second Sino-Japanese War, the Nationalist government confiscated industrial enterprises in formerly Japanese-occupied areas of China and in Japanese puppet states, like the Wang Jingwei regime. These confiscated enterprises were re-organized into Chinese state-owned enterprises, primarily under the control of the NRC, China Textile Corporation, and China Merchants Steam Navigation Company. Among the Japanese enterprises reorganized under the NRC was Showa Steel Works, which along with 22 other Japanese enterprises in Anshan became National Resources Commission Anshan Iron and Steel Works, Ltd.

After the Nationalists' defeat in the Chinese Civil War, most of the NRC's geologists and engineers remained in mainland China and worked for the new People's Republic of China. The Yumen Oil Field, one of the NRC's major projects, was peacefully transferred to the PRC government. Fifteen members of the NRC were invited to the Central Finance and Economy Commission, the government organ that handled national economic planning and construction management during the transitional Government Administration Council.

The Republic of China government on Taiwan abolished the NRC in 1952. It functions were overtaken by the Council on U.S. Aid and the Industrial Development Commission.

== See also ==
- History of the Republic of China
