= History of Peiyang University =

National Peiyang University
- 国立北洋大学
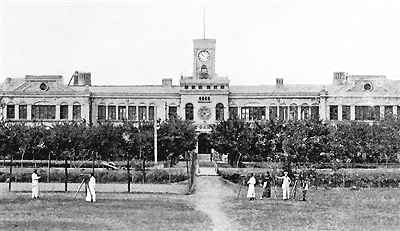
- Main building of Peiyang University
- Motto: Seeking truth from facts 实事求是
- Type: National university
- Established: 1895
- Founder: Sheng Xuanhuai
- Location: Tianjin, China
- Colors: Peiyang Blue
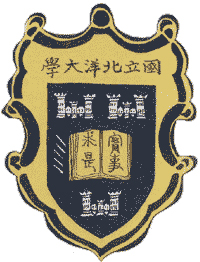

National Peiyang University (北洋大学堂), originally Imperial Tientsin University, was established in Tianjin in October 1895 by Sheng Xuanhuai, the official of the Tianjin Customs, with the approval of the Guangxu Emperor of Qing dynasty. It was the first government-run university in modern China where western science & technology was its main focus. The school motto was "Seeking truth from facts" (实事求是). In 1951, by Chinese government's order, the university was renamed as Tianjin University.

In 1912, it was renamed National Peiyang University, and the following year it was renamed National Peiyang University. In 1917, Peiyang University merged into Peking University. By 1920, Peiyang University began to specialize in engineering education. In 1928, the National Government promoted the university district system. During this period, the school was renamed as the Second Institute of Engineering at National Peiping University.

The following year the university district system was abolished. The original Peiyang University was retired from Peking University. Because it was specialized in engineering, it was not in accordance with the university system. Peiyang Institute of Technology. In 1937, due to the Second Sino-Japanese War, the National Peiyang Institute of Technology moved west to Xi'an to form the National Xi'an Ad-hoc University and was renamed the National Northwest Associated University in March of the following year. In July, it was reorganized into the National Northwestern Institute of Technology. In 1943, under the auspices of Peiyang University's alumni reunification, the Ministry of Education independently designated Yingsi University's College of Engineering and established the Taishun Peiyang Institute of Technology. Affected by this, Peiyang University alumni established Xijing Branch of Peiyang Institute of Technology in Xi'an. In 1945, when the Second Sino-Japanese War ended, Peiyang University alumni's call for returning to Tianjin was growing louder. In January 1946, the Ministry of Education ordered Taishun Peiyang Institute of Technology, Peiyang Institute of Technology Xijing Branch and National Northwestern Engineering College to return to Tianjin for re-establishment. National Peiyang University was demobilized at the site of Xigu, Tianjin, and civil engineering, hydraulic engineering, and mining engineering were established. The five engineering research institutes of metallurgical engineering and chemical engineering actively carry out academic exchanges and scientific research and are known as the “science fortress building a nation”. In 1951, the National Peiyang University was merged with the Hebei Institute of Technology and named Tianjin University.

At present, the campus site of Peiyang University is on the campus of Hebei University of Technology. The existing buildings include Tuancheng, Nanlou and North Buildings. In May 2013, the site of Peiyang University was upgraded to a national key cultural relics protection unit. In September 2016, the site of Peiyang University was selected as one of the first Chinese Architectural Heritage Lists in the 20th Century. Since Tianjin University has inherited the academic ties of Peiyang University, Tianjin University is currently holding the annual celebration of Tianjin University (Northern University) on October 2. Tianjin University has successively established Peiyang Square, 100th Anniversary Peiyang Memorial Pavilion, Peiyang Science Building, 120th Anniversary Peiyang Memorial Pavilion, etc. The celebration of Peiyang University Hall was established in October 1895.

== School name ==
=== Research on the initial school name ===
The name originally used when Peiyang University was founded and the official opening date had a variety of arguments because the files were burned and there was no way to verify. One view is that the name of Peiyang University was "Tianjin Peiyang Chinese and Western School" (天津北洋中西学堂) at the beginning of its establishment. This statement originated from the "Tianjin Chinese and Western School Constitution" (《天津中学学堂章程》) prepared by Sheng Xuanhuai and the "Arrangement of the Constitution of the Tianjin Chinese and Western School" (《拟设天津中西学堂章程禀》) proposed by Sheng Xuanhuai.

Another argument stems from the fact that the Governor of Zhili Province, Wang Wenshao, wrote a memorial to Emperor Guangxu for the purpose of creating a Western School by the head of customs by Sheng Xuanhuai (《津海关道盛宣怀创办西学学堂禀明立案由》). The memorial uses the name of “Tianjin Peiyang Western School” (天津北洋西学学堂). Therefore, Peiyang University (北洋大学堂) is presumed to be under construction. It was originally named "Tianjin Peiyang Western School" (天津北洋西学学堂) and was later renamed "Peiyang University" (北洋大学堂). This is a common saying. This was adopted in the Peiyang University-Tianjin University History published by Tianjin University Press in 1990.

However, scholars who specialize in the history of Peiyang University have verified based on historical data. In fact, when Peiyang University was founded, the initial names of the schools were Peiyang University (北洋大学堂), Peiyang University (北洋大学堂) and its English “Pei-yang-ta-hsiieh-t'ang" appeared in the 1895 Peiking Tientisn Times and Zhili Province Times. Because the school used the "Tianjin Chinese and Western School Constitution" approved by Emperor Guangxu, it caused misinformation.

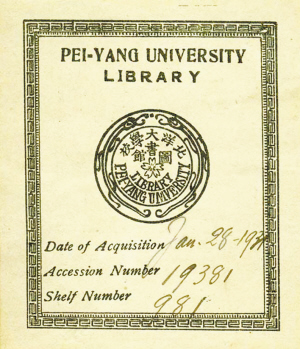
A library book collection printed with "PEI-YANG UNIVERSITY"

=== Evolution of the Institution's Name ===
According to historical research, when Beiyang University was founded in 1895, its official name was Beiyang University Hall. On 19 January 1912, the Ministry of Education issued the Provisional Regulations on General Education, which required that “all xuetang (學堂) be uniformly renamed xuexiao (學校).” Accordingly, Beiyang University Hall was renamed Beiyang University. The following year, it was again renamed National Beiyang University.

In 1928, in response to the National Government's implementation of the university-district system, the institution was renamed the Second College of Engineering, National Peking University. It was restored the next year, but because it specialized solely in engineering and did not conform to the full university structure, it adopted the provisional name National Beiyang Institute of Technology, while a Preparatory Committee for National Beiyang University was established simultaneously.

In 1937, due to the outbreak of the War of Resistance Against Japan, the National Beiyang Institute of Technology relocated to Xi'an, where it helped form the National Xi'an Temporary University. In March of the following year, the institution was renamed National Northwest Associated University, and underwent another reorganization that July.

After the war ended in 1946, the Taishun Beiyang Institute of Technology, the Xijing Branch of Beiyang Institute of Technology, and the National Northwestern Institute of Technology all returned to Tianjin and were reestablished.

In 1951, National Beiyang University and Hebei Institute of Technology were merged to form Tianjin University.

Although the institution's official name underwent many changes, the most widely recognized and commonly used remains “Beiyang University.”

=== English Names ===
According to scholarly research, as early as November 1895, the English-language newspaper The Peking and Tientsin Times used the name Beiyang University Hall in its coverage of the opening of the institution, rendering it phonetically as “Pei-yang-ta-hsiieh-t'ang.” Over the years, Beiyang University was translated variously as “Imperial Tientsin University” and “Peiyang University.” During the period of the National Peiyang Institute of Technology, its English name was “National Peiyang Technical Institute.”

== University History ==
=== Preparatory Period ===
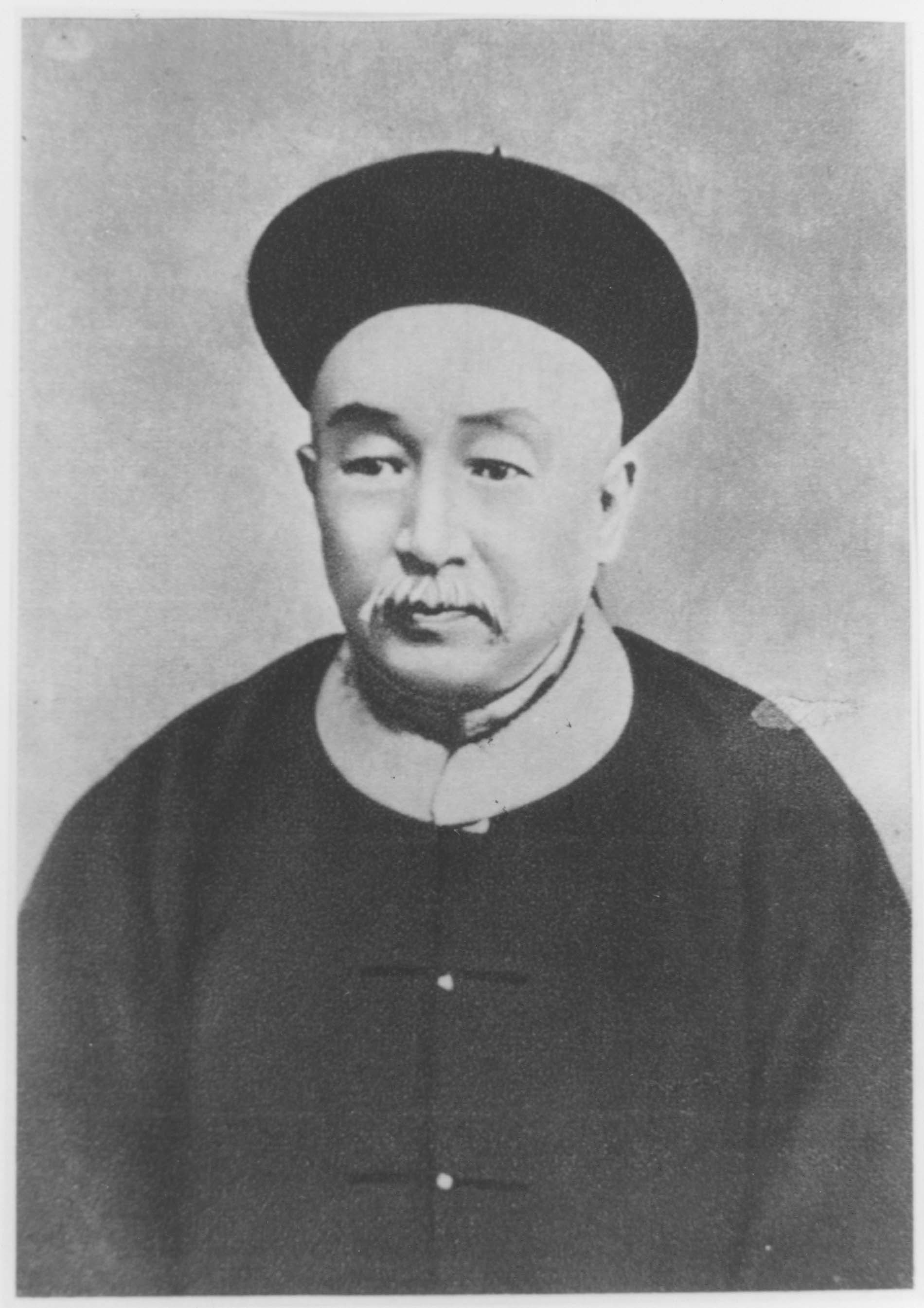
Sheng Xuanhuai, founder of Beiyang University

In 1892, after Sheng Xuanhuai was appointed Tianjin Customs Circuit Intendant, he began studying plans to establish a modern school. He maintained close contact with Calvin W. Mateer (Ding Jiali)—an American missionary who operated his own Sino-Western school in Tianjin and served as Li Hongzhang's English tutor—and the two worked together to discuss matters related to founding the institution. Acting on the intentions of Li Hongzhang, Viceroy of Zhili and Beiyang Minister, Sheng Xuanhuai and Mateer jointly prepared for the creation of a new-style school, drafting its regulations, guidelines, and implementation plans.

After China's defeat in the First Sino-Japanese War and the signing of the Treaty of Shimonoseki, the idea of “saving the nation through education” gained momentum, and the push to develop modern industry highlighted a shortage of talent. Sheng Xuanhuai revised the Proposed Regulations for Establishing the Tianjin Sino-Western School and, on 19 September 1895 (the first day of the eighth lunar month of Guangxu 21), submitted it to Wang Wenshao, the succeeding Viceroy of Zhili and Beiyang Minister, requesting imperial approval to establish a modern school.

Influenced by post-war intellectual trends that criticized traditional Chinese learning and advocated Western learning, Wang Wenshao renamed the proposed “Sino-Western School” to “Western School”, though he made no amendments to the original regulations of the Tianjin Sino-Western School. On 30 September, he memorialized the throne with the document Report by Tianjin Customs Circuit Intendant Sheng Xuanhuai Requesting Permission to Establish a Western School. Only a few days later, on 2 October, the Guangxu Emperor approved the memorial with the rescript “Let the relevant ministry be informed,” appointing Sheng Xuanhuai as the first supervisor of the institution.

To expedite the founding process, Sheng Xuanhuai repurchased, with pooled funds, the premises of Bowen Academy, which had been pawned to a bank due to financial difficulties and left unused for several years. He then used Bowen Academy's original facilities to establish Beiyang University Hall.

=== Early Development ===
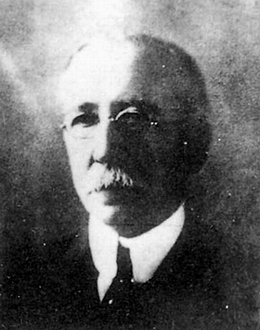
Charles Daniel Tenney, the first chief instructor of the Beiyang University Hall

On 18 October 1895, with the involvement of Sheng Xuanhuai and Wang Wenshao, then Viceroy of Zhili, Beiyang University Hall was officially opened on the former site of Bowen Academy. Student recruitment was carried out in Hong Kong and other regions; although more than a thousand applied, only a little over ten were ultimately admitted.

At its founding, Beiyang University Hall consisted of a First Class School and a Second Class School. The First Class School, with a four-year program modeled on American undergraduate education, offered five fields: engineering, electrical studies, mineralogy, mechanics, and calendrical science (i.e., five training tracks). At that time, the school had mineralogy but no metallurgy. The Second Class School served as a university preparatory and upper-secondary division.

In early 1897, Sheng Xuanhuai, then in charge of railways, ordered the soon-to-open Jinyu Railway School (later known as the Beiyang Railway Official School at Shanhaiguan) to be incorporated into Beiyang University Hall. He also instructed the university to admit an additional 20 students to form the Luhan Railway School. In November of the same year, Hu Yufen, appointed superintendent of the Tianjin–Luguo Railway, ordered the railway school to be separated from Beiyang University Hall once again.

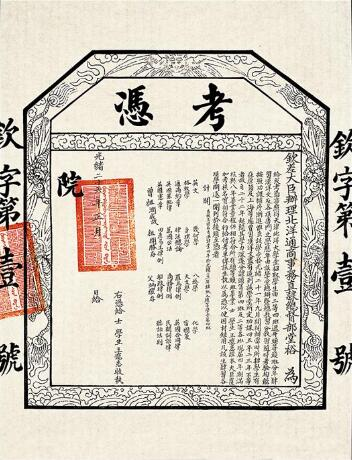
The first diploma (Imperial Certificate No. 1) issued to Wang Chonghui

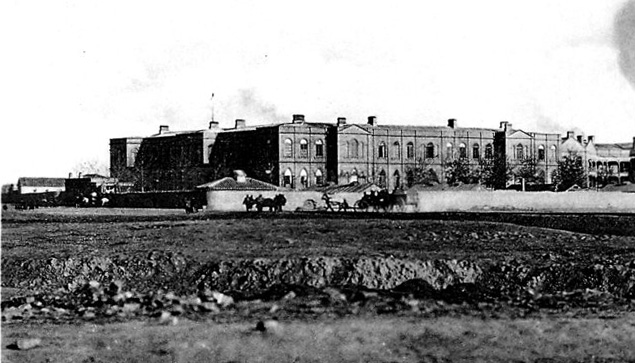
Beiyang University buildings before 1902

In 1900, the first cohort graduated from Beiyang University Hall. Wang Chonghui, who had been admitted from Hong Kong and graduated with the highest distinction, received Imperial Certificate No. 1—the first diploma ever granted by a Chinese university.

That same year, the Eight-Nation Alliance invaded Tianjin and Beijing. The university was forced to close temporarily. Some faculty and students fled south to Shanghai, where, under Sheng Xuanhuai's arrangement, they entered a specially established railway class at Nanyang Public School. The Beiyang campus was seized and used as a barracks by German troops; equipment and archives were destroyed. As a result, the university later had no verifiable opening date to celebrate as its anniversary and instead adopted 2 October 1895—the date of the Guangxu Emperor's rescript approving its establishment—as its founding day.

In 1901, after years of preparation, Sheng Xuanhuai entrusted John Fryer (Fu Lanya) to lead Wang Chonghui, Chen Jintao, and six other students to study in the United States—the first group of Beiyang students sent abroad.

When Yuan Shikai succeeded as Viceroy of Zhili and Beiyang Minister, he actively promoted modern education in Tianjin. He repeatedly negotiated with the Germans seeking return of the campus but was unsuccessful. Later, Chief Instructor Tenney traveled to Berlin to negotiate compensation. Citing German land-purchase regulations, he demanded indemnity for the occupation of the facilities—amounting to 50,000 taels of silver, which became funds for reconstruction.

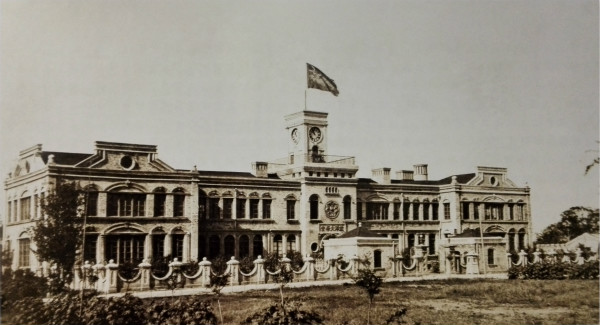
The main academic building erected in 1902 using German indemnity funds

In September 1902, Yuan Shikai ordered the entire arsenal at Xigu to be assigned to Beiyang University Hall as its new campus. During reconstruction, Tenney used German indemnity funds to build a new academic building and expanded the library. Additional foreign-faculty residences, Chinese-faculty quarters, and administrative offices were constructed. Existing warehouses were converted—one into an auditorium, two into classrooms, and six into dormitories. That year, Yuan Shikai also appointed Tenney concurrently as chief instructor of the Zhili Higher School in Baoding, which he reorganized into the preparatory division of Beiyang University Hall.

In April 1903, the university officially resumed classes at Xigu. Those who had moved to Shanghai with the railway class returned. Dozens of former students from Beiyang University Hall and the Beiyang Naval Academy were also admitted; due to uneven preparation, all entered the preparatory division first, then advanced into one of three departments—Law, Civil Engineering, or Mining & Metallurgy—based on examination results.

In 1907, a teacher-training program for English instructors in secondary schools was briefly added but soon discontinued because higher-level normal schools had already been established in Tianjin and Baoding. In 1911, the Qing government granted 11 outstanding graduates the status of Jinshi and appointed them as junior compilers (bujishi) in the Hanlin Academy; 9 mid-level graduates were also granted Jinshi status.

After the establishment of the Republic of China in 1912, Beiyang University Hall was renamed Beiyang University. The First Class School became the University Division, and the Second Class School became the Preparatory Division. The university was placed under the new Ministry of Education, though funding continued to come from Zhili Province, and students shifted from government-funded to self-funded status.

In 1913, the institution was renamed National Beiyang University, and the office of supervisor was replaced by president. Because of geographic proximity and overlapping disciplines between Beiyang University and Peking University, the Ministry of Education proposed mergers in 1913 and 1914—first “Peking University into Beiyang University,” then the reverse—but both plans were rejected. A later proposal that Peking University retain Arts, Science, Law, and Medicine while Beiyang focus exclusively on Engineering and gradually expand also failed to gain approval. In 1917, Cai Yuanpei recommended that Beiyang University become exclusively an engineering institution; the Ministry of Education approved the plan.

In 1918, three Beiyang graduates achieved national first-place rankings: Xu Mo in the national diplomatic examination, Li Ping in the senior civil-service examination, and Kang Shimin in the Tsinghua study-abroad examination.

During its early years, students at Beiyang University were active in athletics. In May 1917, 25 students from Beiyang University, Tsinghua College, Peking University, and St. John's University (Shanghai) participated in the Far Eastern Championship Games held in Tokyo.

=== Specialization in Engineering ===
Beginning in 1917, under orders from the Ministry of Education, the Law Department of Peiyang University was forced to cease admissions, and the university gradually expanded as a school specializing solely in engineering. Graduates of the Peiyang University preparatory program who wished to study law were transferred to Peking University, while graduates of the Peking University preparatory program who wished to study engineering were transferred to Peiyang University.

In 1919, when the May Fourth Movement erupted, students of Peiyang University actively took part in strikes, demonstrations, and other activities. The strike lasted for a total of three months, and students such as Sun Yueqi and Zhang Tailei were expelled from Peiyang University for participating in it. In the same year, the Department of Mining and Metallurgy was further divided into the Mining Department and the Metallurgy Department.

In 1920, all remaining students of the Law Department graduated, and the law faculty members were incorporated into Peking University. Peiyang University then entered a period of exclusive specialization in engineering. The Metallurgy Department became independent, and the university at that time offered three departments: Civil Engineering, Mining, and Metallurgy. Soon after, in 1925, Mining and Metallurgy were merged back into a single Mining and Metallurgy Department.

In March 1924, students of Peiyang University, dissatisfied that the university had not adopted the new educational system, petitioned President Feng Xiyun to implement the new curriculum and establish a board of trustees. Their petition was rejected. Student representatives then petitioned the Ministry of Education and the Zhili provincial government. On March 14, Feng Xiyun expelled the student representatives, triggering a large-scale protest, and subsequently resigned.

In July 1928, Cai Yuanpei, then president of the Academia Sinica for Higher Education (中华民国大学院), disregarded opposition and objective realities and attempted to imitate the French model by establishing a university district system. He designated Hebei and Rehe provinces, along with Beiping and Tianjin, as the Beiping University District. The then-president of Peiyang University, Liu Xianzhou, opposed the move and resigned, and Mao Yisheng succeeded him. The name “National Peiyang University” was abolished and replaced with the National Beiping University Second College of Engineering, abbreviated as National Second College of Engineering.

On October 6, 1928, due to severe public opposition, high costs, and administrative disunity, Cai Yuanpei resigned as president of the Academia Sinica for Higher Education. On October 24, the university district system and the Academia Sinica were abolished. Peiyang University, Peking University, and other institutions began seeking independence from the Beiping University system. On March 31, 1929, the Second College of Engineering suffered a catastrophic fire that destroyed the main teaching building, library, hydraulic research lab, materials testing lab, geological specimen room, ore display room, and drawing lecture hall. The cause of the fire could not be determined. After the disaster, President Mao Yisheng secured funds from the Boxer Indemnity for reconstruction, and alumni from various regions provided multiple rounds of support.

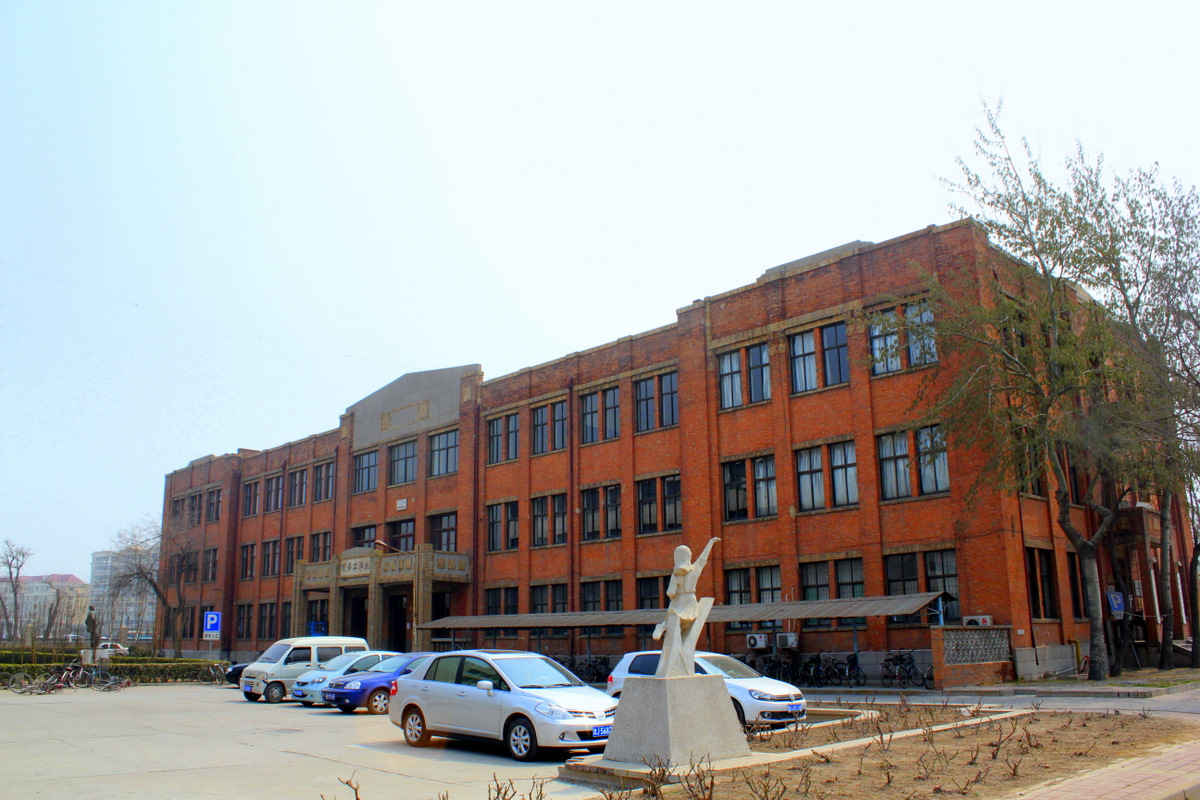
South Building of Peiyang University, completed in 1933

In August 1929, the Second College of Engineering formally separated from National Beiping University and the university district system. Since the school specialized solely in engineering and did not meet the requirements of a comprehensive university, it adopted the provisional name National Peiyang Institute of Technology. Departments were renamed into academic “sections,” including Mining and Metallurgy Engineering, Civil Engineering, and Mechanical Engineering. The Ministry of Education formed a “National Peiyang University Preparatory Committee” composed of alumni such as Wang Chonghui, Chen Lifu, and Wang Zhengting in hopes of restoring the university system. However, during the eight years before the outbreak of the Anti-Japanese War, the committee never held a single meeting.

In February 1930, student refusal to pay fees resulted in class suspensions, leading Mao Yisheng to resign from the presidency. In 1931, the Institute added a major in Electrical Engineering.

In November 1933, under the leadership of Li Shutian, the “Peiyang Alumni Association Charter” was drafted, and funds were raised from alumni to construct two new buildings—South Building and North Building—on the site of the main building destroyed in 1929. That same year, the Institute established the Mining and Metallurgy Engineering Research Institute and the Engineering Materials Research Institute. The former included divisions for geology, exploration, metallurgy, mineral processing, and fuels; the latter included divisions for wood, masonry, cement and concrete, steel, and asphalt. In 1934, the two were merged into the Peiyang Institute of Technology Engineering Research Institute, with a Mining and Metallurgy Engineering Department. The Institute admitted graduate students and, before the July 7th Incident in 1937, had graduated three master's students, two of whom were in metallurgical engineering.

In 1934, the Civil Engineering Department of Henan University ceased operations, and its 22 students along with equipment were transferred to the Peiyang Institute of Technology. In 1935, on the 40th anniversary of the founding of Peiyang University, the Peiyang University Anthem was composed. In the same year, the school discontinued its preparatory program.

In March 1937, President Li Shutian personally drafted the “Proposal and Phased Implementation Plan for Reestablishing National Peiyang University” and submitted it to the Ministry of Education. The plan envisioned expanding Peiyang into a comprehensive university with five divisions—Arts, Science, Engineering, Medicine, and Law—organized into four colleges, as well as establishing research institutes to promote scientific research. The medical college had already entered substantive planning, but the project was ultimately halted due to the outbreak of war.

=== Wartime Against Japan ===
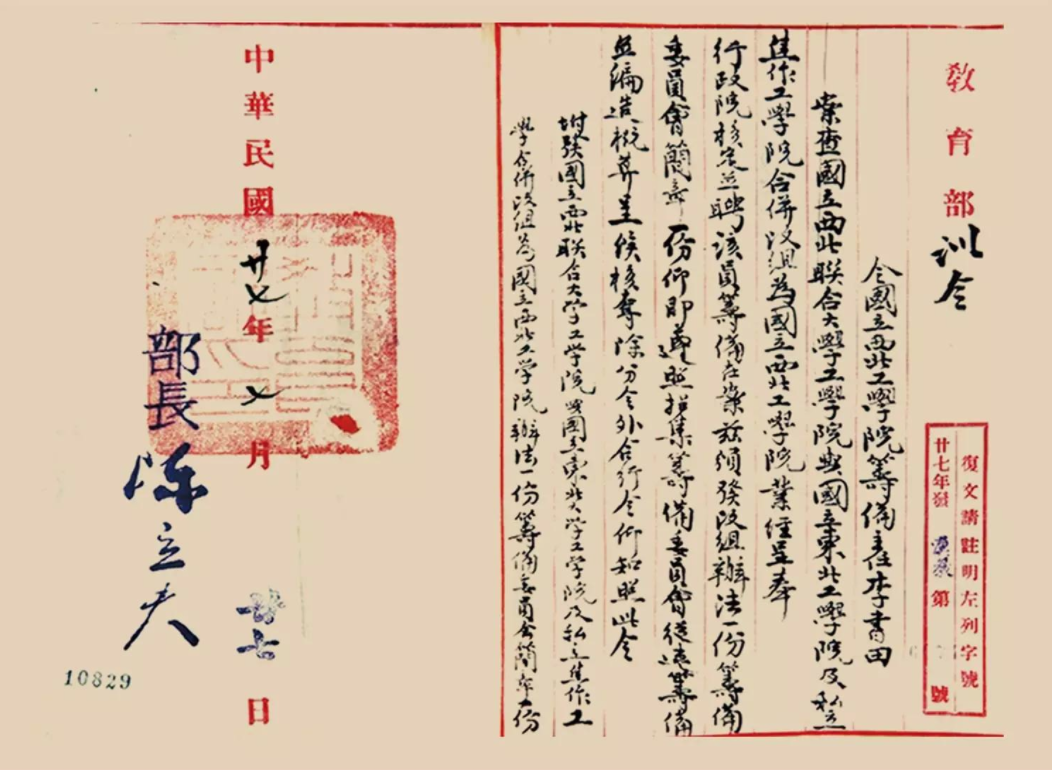
The Ministry of Education directive establishing the National Northwestern Institute of Technology, with former Beiyang Institute of Technology president Li Shutian appointed as director of the preparatory committee

After Japan launched its full-scale invasion of China in July 1937, Tianjin fell to the enemy. On September 10, under orders from the Ministry of Education, the National Beiyang Institute of Technology, together with Peking University, Peking Normal University, the Academia Sinica-affiliated institutes, and others, relocated to Shaanxi to establish the National Provisional University of Xi'an. In March 1938, the Provisional University of Xi'an was renamed the National Northwest Associated University. Because the university was located in Northwest China, its funding was extremely limited. Material shortages, frequent relocations, and difficulty recruiting faculty created serious obstacles to running the school. The large influx of faculty and students led to soaring prices, growing dissatisfaction, and repeated student protests. Compared with the National Southwest Associated University, factional struggles within the Northwest Associated University were more intense and prolonged, making integration difficult.

In July 1938, the Ministry of Education of the Republic of China reorganized the National Northwest Associated University. The National Beiyang Institute of Technology, together with the College of Engineering of Northeastern University, formed the National Northwestern Institute of Technology. However, during the preparation process, different parties disputed whether the new school should adopt a committee system or a dean-centered system. Meanwhile, Li Shutian's strict and uncompromising enforcement of Beiyang's student regulations triggered a large-scale student movement at the end of 1938. In January 1939, after failing to expel several protesting students, Li Shutian left the school along with well-known professors originally from the National Beiyang Institute of Technology—Wei Shoukun, Zeng Jiong, Zhou Zonglian—and a number of students.

In October 1941, at the annual meeting of the Chinese Institute of Engineers held in Guiyang, Beiyang University alumni called for the restoration of the National Beiyang University and for fundraising to establish a “Private Beiyang Institute of Technology”, as well as the establishment of Beiyang High School. During this period, former presidents of the Beiyang Institute of Technology, Li Shutian and Mao Yisheng, discussed raising funds and purchasing land in Guizhou to restore Beiyang University, but these efforts were unsuccessful. Under pressure from the Beiyang alumni community, Education Minister Chen Lifu introduced a special measure: when Zhejiang Provincial Yingshi University was upgraded to a national university, its engineering college was separated, renamed the Beiyang Institute of Technology, and given independent admission rights—a school later known as the “Taishun Beiyang Institute of Technology”. After the establishment of the Taishun Beiyang Institute of Technology, alumni who had relocated to Xi'an were encouraged and initiated the formation of the Beiyang Institute of Technology Xijing Branch.

=== Return to Tianjin ===
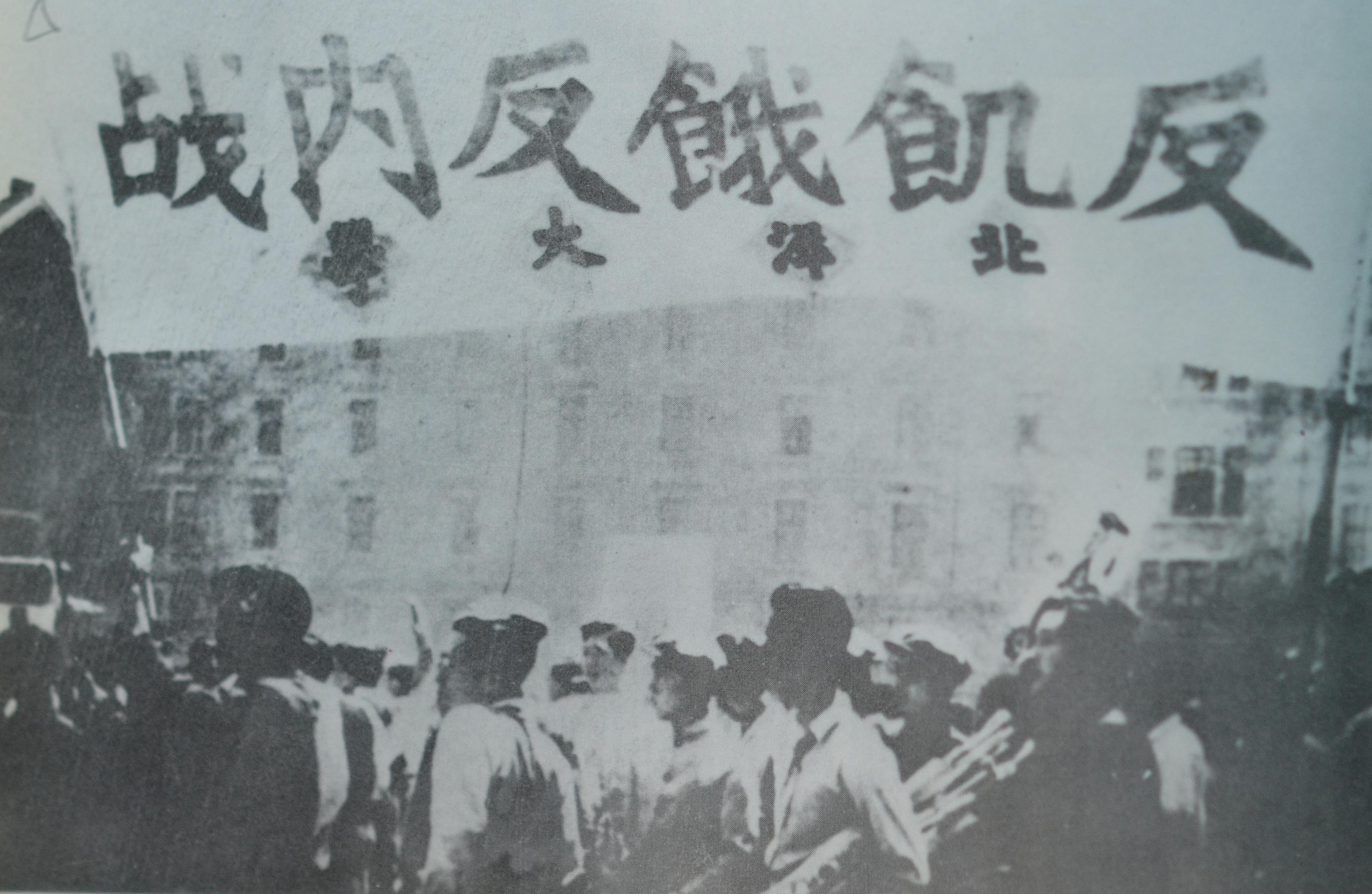
May 20, 1947: Beiyang University students marching in the “Anti-Hunger, Anti–Civil War” protest

In August 1945, following victory in the war against Japan and the recovery of Tianjin, calls for the restoration of Beiyang University grew increasingly strong. In October 1945, the first graduate of Beiyang University and then-Secretary-General of the National Defense Supreme Council, Wang Chonghui, personally contacted the Ministry of Education requesting the early restoration of this historic institution. In January 1946, the Nationalist Government formally issued the order to restore Beiyang University and appointed Wang Chonghui as chair of the Restoration Committee. That autumn, the Beiyang Institute of Technology returned to Tianjin and resumed operations on its former Xigu campus, now renamed National Beiyang University. Subsequently, faculty and students from the National Northwestern Institute of Technology, the Taishun Beiyang Institute of Technology, and the Beiyang Institute of Technology Xijing Branch returned to Tianjin to participate in the restoration.

On October 22, Beiyang University officially reopened. Mao Yisheng served as president. The university had two colleges—Arts and Engineering.

The College of Arts included departments of Mathematics, Physics, Chemistry, and Geology.

The College of Engineering included departments of Civil, Hydraulic, Mining and Metallurgy, Architecture, Chemical, Mechanical, Electrical, Aeronautical, and Textile Engineering.

In 1946, Chen Jinmin, then dean of the College of Arts, traveled to Beijing to take over the fifth division of the Peking Provisional University preparatory program and reorganized it into the Beiyang University Peking Division. In May 1947, when the Ministry of Education ordered the Peking Division to relocate to Tianjin, the directive faced strong opposition. In August, the division was taken over by Peking University. During the restoration period, Beiyang University experienced several student movements. At the end of 1946, the Shen Chong incident sparked nationwide protests, and students from Beiyang University and Nankai University organized large-scale demonstrations.

In 1947, five research institutes were established: Civil Engineering, Hydraulic Engineering, Mining Engineering, Metallurgical Engineering, and Chemical Engineering. The Beiyang Department of Hydraulic Engineering, together with the North China Hydraulic Engineering Administration, established the “Tianjin Hydraulic Laboratory,” which later supported hydraulic engineering development in North China.

In January 1949, following the political change in Tianjin, the school's administrative affiliation was adjusted multiple times, coming under the Tianjin Military Control Commission, then the North China People's Government Higher Education Commission, and finally the Ministry of Education of the Central People's Government. On June 2, 1951, Education Minister Ma Xulun issued a directive merging Beiyang University with Hebei Institute of Technology. The new institution was officially established on August 1, with the provisional name Tianjin University. On September 26, the founding and opening ceremony of Tianjin University was held in the Great Hall of the South Campus of Beiyang University. Meanwhile, construction began on the new Tianjin University campus in Qilitai.

=== Aftermath ===
After September 1951, Beiyang University's archives and materials were inherited by Tianjin University, and Tianjin University's motto and anthem continue the Beiyang tradition Beginning in 1954, Taiwan entered a wave of university “restorations”. In the 1960s, Beiyang alumni who had relocated to Taiwan attempted to restore the National Beiyang University in Taiwan, but failed. For example, in 1969, Beiyang alumnus and then-Presidential adviser Chen Lifu traveled to Taoyuan County to inspect potential sites for restoration. In 1970, the Ministry of Education of the Republic of China even planned to merge Beiyang University, Sun Yat-sen University, and Jinan University as part of a joint restoration, but the plan was never realized. In 1980, on the 85th anniversary of Tianjin University (Beiyang University), former president Mao Yisheng proposed restoring the name “Beiyang University.” The proposal received wide support from alumni but ultimately did not succeed.
