= Thallium(I) sulfate =

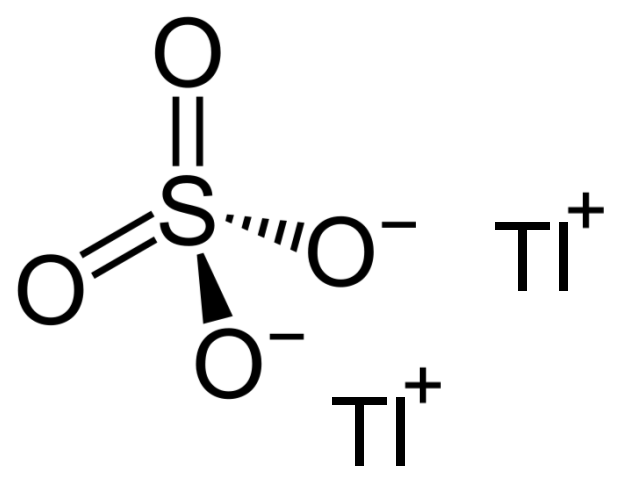
- Thallium(I) sulfate

Names
- Other names Thallous sulfate, Thallium sulfate

Identifiers
CAS Number	7446-18-6
3D model (JSmol)	Interactive image
ChEBI	CHEBI:81836
ChemSpider	23218
ECHA InfoCard	100.028.365
KEGG	C18567
PubChem CID	24833
RTECS number	XG6800000
UNII	U9F9QIR12T
UN number	1707
CompTox Dashboard (EPA)	DTXSID1024336
- InChI: InChI=1S/H2O4S.2Tl/c1-5(2,3)4;;/h(H2,1,2,3,4);;/q;2*+1/p-2 Key: YTQVHRVITVLIRD-UHFFFAOYSA-L; InChI=1/H2O4S.2Tl/c1-5(2,3)4;;/h(H2,1,2,3,4);;/q;2*+1/p-2 Key: YTQVHRVITVLIRD-NUQVWONBAB
- SMILES: [Tl+].[Tl+].[O-]S([O-])(=O)=O

Properties
Chemical formula	Tl_{2}SO_{4}
Molar mass	504.83 g/mol
Appearance	white prisms or dense white powder
Odor	odorless
Density	6.77 g/cm^{3}
Melting point	632 °C (1,170 °F; 905 K)
Solubility in water	2.70 g/100 mL (0 °C); 4.87 g/100 mL (20 °C); 18.45 g/100 mL (100 °C)
Magnetic susceptibility (χ)	−112.6·10^{−6} cm^{3}/mol
Refractive index (n_{D})	1.860

Structure
Crystal structure	rhomboid

Hazards
- GHS labelling
Pictograms	(GHS06: Toxic) (GHS07: Exclamation mark) (GHS08: Health hazard) (GHS09: Environmental hazard)
Signal word	Danger
Hazard statements	H300, H315, H372, H411
Precautionary statements	P260, P264, P270, P273, P280, P301+P310, P302+P352, P314, P321, P330, P332+P313, P362, P391, P405, P501
NFPA 704 (fire diamond)	4 0 0
- Lethal dose or concentration (LD, LC)
LD_{50} (median dose)	16 mg/kg (rat, oral); 23.5 mg/kg (mouse, oral)
- Except where otherwise noted, data are given for materials in their standard state (at 25 °C [77 °F], 100 kPa). verify (what is ?) Infobox references

Thallium(I) sulfate (Tl_{2}SO_{4}) or thallous sulfate is the sulfate salt of thallium in the common +1 oxidation state, as indicated by the Roman numeral I. It is often referred to as simply thallium sulfate.

== Uses ==
During the last two centuries, Tl_{2}SO_{4} had been used for various medical treatments but was abandoned. In the later 1900s it found use mainly for rodenticides and insecticides These applications were prohibited in 1975 in the US due to the nonselective nature of its toxicity.

Tl_{2}SO_{4} is mostly used today as a source of Tl^{+} in the research laboratory. It is a precursor to thallium(I) sulfide (Tl_{2}S), which exhibits high electrical conductivity when exposed to infrared light.

== Preparation ==
Thallium(I) sulfate is produced by the reaction of thallium metal with sulfuric acid followed by crystallization.

== Structure ==
Tl_{2}SO_{4} adopts the same structure as K_{2}SO_{4}. In aqueous solution, the thallium(I) cations and the sulfate anions are separated and highly solvated. Thallium(I) sulfate crystals have a C_{2} symmetry.

== Environmental presence ==
Thallium(I) sulfate was used in 1950s Israel to control the rodent population; it is suspected that this resulted in the disappearance of the brown fish owl.

The majority of anthropogenic thallium emission is as thallium sulfate dust.

Thallium(I) sulfate inhibits the growth of plants by preventing germination.

== Toxicity ==
Thallium(I) sulfate is soluble in water and its toxic effects are derived from the thallium(I) cation. The mean lethal dose of thallium(I) sulfate for an adult is about 1 gram. Since thallium(I) sulfate is a simple powder with indistinctive properties, it can easily be mistaken for more innocuous chemicals. It can enter the body by ingestion, inhalation, or through contact with the skin. The thallium(I) cation is very similar to potassium and sodium cations, which are essential for life. After the thallium ion enters the cell, many of the processes that transport potassium and sodium are disrupted. Due to its poisonous nature, many western countries have banned the use of thallium(I) sulfate in products for home use and many companies have also stopped using this compound.

A dosage in excess of 500 mg is reported as fatal. Thallium(I) sulfate, after entering the body, concentrates itself in the kidneys, liver, brain, and other tissues in the body.
