= 1949 Kangaroo tour of New Zealand =

1949 rugby league tour

The 1949 Kangaroo Tour of New Zealand was the fourth full tour of New Zealand by the Australia national rugby league team and the first following the end of World War II. The Australians played ten matches on a one-month tour, including Two tests against the New Zealand national rugby league team.

The tour began on 12 September and finished on 10 October.

== Leadership ==
The tour's Captain-Coach was Newtown halfback and 1948 Kangaroo Tourist Keith Froome. In games not played by Froome, the Kangaroos were captained either by former Eastern Suburbs 5/8 Wally O'Connell or by former South Sydney half Billy Thompson who by this time was playing for Toowoomba Valleys in Queensland.

== Touring squad ==
Of the 22 man squad, 14 had been members of the 1948–49 Kangaroo tour of Great Britain and France. Manly-Warringah front rower Roy Bull, and Parramatta centre Ian Johnston became the first players respectively to gain Kangaroos and Test selection from their clubs who had only been admitted into the Sydney Premiership in 1947. Bull's selection also made him the first local junior from Manly to play test football while Johnston scored 4 tries on debut in the tour opener against South Auckland and also made his Test debut in the 1st Test at the Basin Reserve in Wellington.

* Tests and (as sub) included in games total.

Player	Club	Position(s)	Games (as sub)	Tests (as sub)	Tries	Goals	F/Goals	Points
Vic Bulgin	Eastern Suburbs	Fullback, Centre	8	–	3	0	0	9
Roy Bull	Manly-Warringah	Prop	6	1	1	0	0	3
Clive Churchill	South Sydney	Fullback	5	2	1	0	0	3
Les Cowie	South Sydney	Lock	8	2	5	0	0	15
Fred de Belin	Balmain	Second-row	5	1	1	0	0	3
Keith Froome (c)	Newtown	Halfback	5	2	2	11	0	28
Johnny Graves	South Sydney	Wing	7	1	12	8	0	52
Ron Griffiths	Ipswich (Qld)	Hooker	3	–	0	0	0	0
Kevin Hansen	Western Suburbs	Second-row	6	–	0	0	0	0
Johnny Hawke	St George	Centre	4	1	1	0	0	3
Jack Holland	St George	Prop	8	2	0	0	0	0
Ian Johnston	Parramatta	Centre	5	1	7	12	0	45
Matt McCoy	St George	Centre	7	2	9	14	0	55
Pat McMahon	Toowoomba Souths (Qld)	Wing	8	2	7	0	0	21
Noel Mulligan	Bowral Blues	Lock, Prop, Second-row	7	2	3	0	0	9
Wally O'Connell	Christian Brothers Wollongong	Five-eighth	5	2	1	0	0	3
Jack Rayner	South Sydney	Second-row	7	2	1	0	0	3
Ron Roberts	St George	Wing	6 (1)	1	8	0	0	24
Kevin Schubert	Wollongong	Hooker	7	2	0	0	0	0
Frank Stanmore	Western Suburbs	Five-eighth	5	–	3	0	0	9
Alan Thompson	Brisbane Souths (Qld)	Prop	4 (1)	–	0	0	0	0
Billy Thompson	Toowoomba Valleys (Qld)	Halfback	5	–	2	0	0	6

== Test Venues ==
Wellington	Auckland
Basin Reserve	Carlaw Park
Capacity: 11,000	Capacity: 20,000

== Tour ==
12 September 1949

South Auckland	7 – 33	Australia
Tries: Turner; Goals: R. Martin (2)	Report	Tries: Ian Johnston (4), Johnny Graves (2), Matt McCoy (2), Ron Roberts; Goals: Johnny Graves (2); Matt McCoy (1)

Davies Park, Huntly
Attendance: 1,823
Referee: Rolly Avery

South Auckland: R. Martin, Turner, O'Carroll, O'Callaghan, A. Rodgers, Phillips, A. Aoaki, Albert Hambleton (c), J. Tupaea, Norman, Tonga, F. Hilton, Moyes. Reserves – . Coach –

Australia: Vic Bulgin, Pat McMahon, Ian Johnston, Matt McCoy, Johnny Graves, Frank Stanmore, Keith Froome (c), Alan Thompson, Kevin Schubert, Jack Holland, Kevin Hansen, Jack Rayner, Noel Mulligan. Reserves – Ron Roberts

=== First test ===
17 September 1949

New Zealand	26 – 21	Australia
Tries: Abby Graham (2); Charlie McBride (2); Tommy Baxter; Warwick Clarke; Goals: Warwick Clarke (4)		Tries: Johnny Graves (2); Matt McCoy; Pat McMahon; Wally O'Connell; Goals: Ian Johnston (3)

Basin Reserve, Wellington
Attendance: 7,737
Referee: Rolly Avery

New Zealand	Position	Australia
Warwick Clarke	FB	Clive Churchill
Dave Redmond	WG	Johnny Graves
Maurie Robertson	CE	Matt McCoy
Tommy Baxter	CE	Ian Johnston
Bill McKenzie	WG	Pat McMahon
Abby Graham	FE	Wally O'Connell
Jack Russell-Green	HB	Keith Froome (c)
Pat Smith (c)	PR	Jack Holland
Bob Aynsley	HK	Kevin Schubert
Jack Newton	PR	Noel Mulligan
Sandy Hurndell	SR	Jack Rayner
Charlie McBride	SR	Fred de Belin
Travers Hardwick	LF	Les Cowie
Scotty McClymont	Coach	Keith Froome

21 September 1949

West Coast NZ Firsts	14 – 39	Australia
Tries: Bob Aynsley, R. Baxendale; Goals: J. Soster (4)	Report	Tries: Ron Roberts (3), Les Cowie (2), Matt McCoy (2), Pat McMahon (2); Goals: Vic Bulgin (3); Matt McCoy (3)

Victoria Park, Greymouth
Attendance: 3,676
Referee: Jim Griffin

West Coast NZ Firsts: J. Soster, J. Curragh, V. Meates, J. Pascoe, M. Thomas (c), George Menzies, M. Ord, Frank Mulcare, Bob Aynsley, Jack Newton, W. Lennon, Charlie McBride, R. Baxendale. Reserves – . Coach –

Australia: Vic Bulgin, Pat McMahon, Johnny Hawke, Matt McCoy, Ron Roberts, Wally O'Connell (c), Billy Thompson, Roy Bull, Ron Griffiths, Jack Holland, Noel Mulligan, Jack Rayner, Les Cowie. Reserves –

24 September 1949

South Island	8 – 38	Australia
Tries: P. Callinan, Bill McKenzie; Goals: J. Soster (1)	Report	Tries: Les Cowie (2), Pat McMahon (2), Johnny Graves, Johnny Hawke, Noel Mulligan, Matt McCoy; Goals: Keith Froome (7)

Addington Showgrounds, Christchurch
Attendance: 2,900
Referee: G. Symes

South Island: J. Soster, Bill McKenzie, P. Callinan, L. Brown, K. Henry, George Menzies, Jimmy Haig, Jack Newton, Bob Aynsley, Pat Smith (c), F. Blanchard, Charlie McBride, Alister Atkinson. Reserves – M. Ord. Coach –

Australia: Vic Bulgin, Pat McMahon, Johnny Hawke, Matt McCoy, Johnny Graves, Wally O'Connell, Keith Froome (c), Noel Mulligan, Kevin Schubert, Jack Holland, Kevin Hansen, Jack Rayner, Les Cowie. Reserves –

26 September 1949

Southern Provinces	15 – 17	Australia
Tries: E. Chatham, A. Haysarm, J. Kraeyl; Goals: B. Sillwell (3)	Report	Tries: Fred de Belin, Johnny Graves, Ron Roberts; Goals: Johnny Graves (3); Ian Johnston (1)

Cooks Gardens, Whanganui
Attendance: 1,500
Referee: G. Kelly

Southern Provinces: B. Sillwell, J. Parata, A. Haysarm, N. Evans, E. Chatham, T. Dodd, J. Sutton, R. Westerley, G. Davidson, Ken English (c), K. O'Brien, L. Morgan, J. Kraeyl. Reserves – . Coach –

Australia: Vic Bulgin, Johnny Graves, Johnny Hawke, Ian Johnston, Ron Roberts, Frank Stanmore, Billy Thompson (c), Roy Bull, Ron Griffiths, Alan Thompson, Kevin Hansen, Fred de Belin, Noel Mulligan. Reserves –

28 September 1949

New Zealand Māori	0 – 33	Australia
Tries: Goals:	Report	Tries: Johnny Graves (4), Matt McCoy, Pat McMahon, Jack Rayner; Goals: Matt McCoy (6)

Pukekura Park, New Plymouth
Attendance: 1,827
Referee: K. McIvor

New Zealand Māori: R. Martin (c), Andrew Berryman, Rex Hohaia, C. Masters, R. Hohua, S. Toka, A. Aoaki, R. Ewe, R. Bolton, Gordon Hohaia, F. Williams, N. Paratine, L. Wright. Reserves – . Coach –

Australia: Vic Bulgin, Pat McMahon, Johnny Hawke, Matt McCoy, Johnny Graves, Wally O'Connell (c), Billy Thompson, Roy Bull, Kevin Schubert, Jack Holland, Fred de Belin, Jack Rayner, Les Cowie. Reserves –

1 October 1949

Auckland	18 – 36	Australia
Tries: D. Anderson, W. Spence; Goals: Warwick Clarke (6)	Report	Tries: Ron Roberts (3), Frank Stanmore (2), Roy Bull, Keith Froome, Matt McCoy; Goals: Keith Froome (3); Matt McCoy (3)

Carlaw Park, Auckland
Attendance: 12,831
Referee: G. Kelly

Auckland: Warwick Clarke (c), D. Anderson, Tommy Baxter, Maurie Robertson, Dave Redmond, Abby Graham, Jack Russell-Green, W. Spence, G. Davidson, Sandy Hurndell, Graham Burgoyne, Allan Laird, R. Rogers. Reserves – . Coach –

Australia: Clive Churchill, Pat McMahon, Vic Bulgin, Matt McCoy, Ron Roberts, Frank Stanmore, Keith Froome (c), Roy Bull, Kevin Schubert, Jack Holland, Kevin Hansen, Fred de Belin, Les Cowie. Reserves –

4 October 1949

Northern Provinces	9 – 39	Australia
Tries: G. Kay; Goals: B. Latham (3)	Report	Tries: Vic Bulgin (2), Ian Johnston (2), Les Cowie, Johnny Graves, Noel Mulligan, Frank Stanmore, Billy Thompson; Goals: Johnny Graves (3); Ian Johnston (2); Vic Bulgin (1)

Jubilee Park, Whangārei
Attendance: 1,164
Referee: J. O'Shannessey

Northern Provinces: B. Latham, J. Rogers, J. Gibson, G. Kay, J. Stringfellow, R. Tweedie, W. Toker, P. Dormer, Cliff Johnson, S. Roff, A. Hambleton, R. Packham, Allan Laird (c). Reserves – . Coach –

Australia: Clive Churchill, Johnny Graves, Vic Bulgin, Ian Johnston, Ron Roberts, Frank Stanmore, Billy Thompson (c), Alan Thompson, Kevin Schubert, Noel Mulligan, Kevin Hansen, Fred de Belin, Les Cowie. Reserves –

=== Second test ===
8 October 1949

New Zealand	10 – 13	Australia
Tries: Tommy Baxter; Bill McKenzie; Goals: Warwick Clarke (2)		Tries: Keith Froome; Noel Mulligan; Matt McCoy; Goals: Keith Froome (1); Matt McCoy (1)

Carlaw Park, Auckland
Attendance: 12,361
Referee: Rolly Avery

New Zealand	Position	Australia
Warwick Clarke	FB	Clive Churchill
Bill McKenzie	WG	Ron Roberts
Tommy Baxter	CE	Johnny Hawke
Maurie Robertson	CE	Matt McCoy
Dave Redmond	WG	Pat McMahon
Len Jordan	FE	Wally O'Connell
Jack Russell-Green	HB	Keith Froome (c)
Ron Westerby	PR	Roy Bull
Bob Aynsley	HK	Kevin Schubert
Pat Smith (c)	PR	Jack Holland
Jack Newton	SR	Noel Mulligan
Charlie McBride	SR	Jack Rayner
Travers Hardwick	LF	Les Cowie
Scotty McClymont	Coach	Keith Froome

10 October 1949

Auckland Colts	16 – 30	Australia
Tries: V. Barchard, S. Rogers; Goals: Des White (5)	Report	Tries: Vic Bulgin, Clive Churchill, Johnny Graves, Ian Johnston, Pat McMahon, Billy Thompson; Goals: Ian Johnston (6)

Carlaw Park, Auckland
Attendance: 1,953
Referee: G. Kelly

Auckland Colts: Des White, N. Moore, J. Fisher, W. Brooking, N. Clarkin, J. Lepper (c), W. Tocker, V. Barchard, S. Rogers, Raymond Cranch, G. McNichol, J. Herring, Joe Wright. Reserves – . Coach –

Australia: Clive Churchill, Pat McMahon, Vic Bulgin, Ian Johnston, Johnny Graves, Frank Stanmore, Billy Thompson (c), Roy Bull, Ron Griffiths, Jack Holland, Kevin Hansen, Jack Rayner, Les Cowie. Reserves – Alan Thompson

== Statistics ==
Leading Try Scorer

- 12 by Johnny Graves

Leading Point Scorer

- 55 by Matt McCoy (9 tries, 14 goals)

Largest Test Attendance

- 12,361 - Second Test vs New Zealand at Carlaw Park, Auckland

Largest non-test Attendance

- 12,831 - Auckland vs Australia at Carlaw Park, Auckland
