= 1949 NSWRFL season =

Rugby league competition

1949 New South Wales Rugby Football League
- Teams: 10
- Premiers: St. George (2nd title)
- Minor premiers: South Sydney (10th title)
- Matches played: 94
- Points scored: 2995
- Top points scorer(s): Bill Keato (163)
- Wooden spoon: Eastern Suburbs (1st spoon)
- Top try-scorer(s): Ron Roberts (25)

The 1949 New South Wales Rugby Football League premiership was the forty-second season of Sydney's top-level professional rugby league football club competition, Australia's first. Ten teams from across the city contested the premiership during the season which culminated in a grand final between St. George and South Sydney.

== Season summary ==
St. George winger Ron Roberts’ 25 tries during 1949 stands in third place behind Les Brennan's 29 in 1954 and Bob Lulham’s 28 in 1947 for the highest number of tries by a player in a debut season.

The 1949 season was also the last in the NSWRFL for future Australian Rugby League Hall of Fame inductee, Vic Hey.

=== Teams ===
- Balmain, formed on 23 January 1908 at Balmain Town Hall
- Canterbury-Bankstown
- Eastern Suburbs, formed on 24 January 1908 at Paddington Town Hall
- Manly-Warringah
- Newtown, formed on 14 January 1908
- North Sydney, formed on 7 February 1908
- Parramatta, formed in November 1946
- South Sydney, formed on 17 January 1908 at Redfern Town Hall
- St. George, formed on 8 November 1920 at Kogarah School of Arts
- Western Suburbs, formed on 4 February 1908

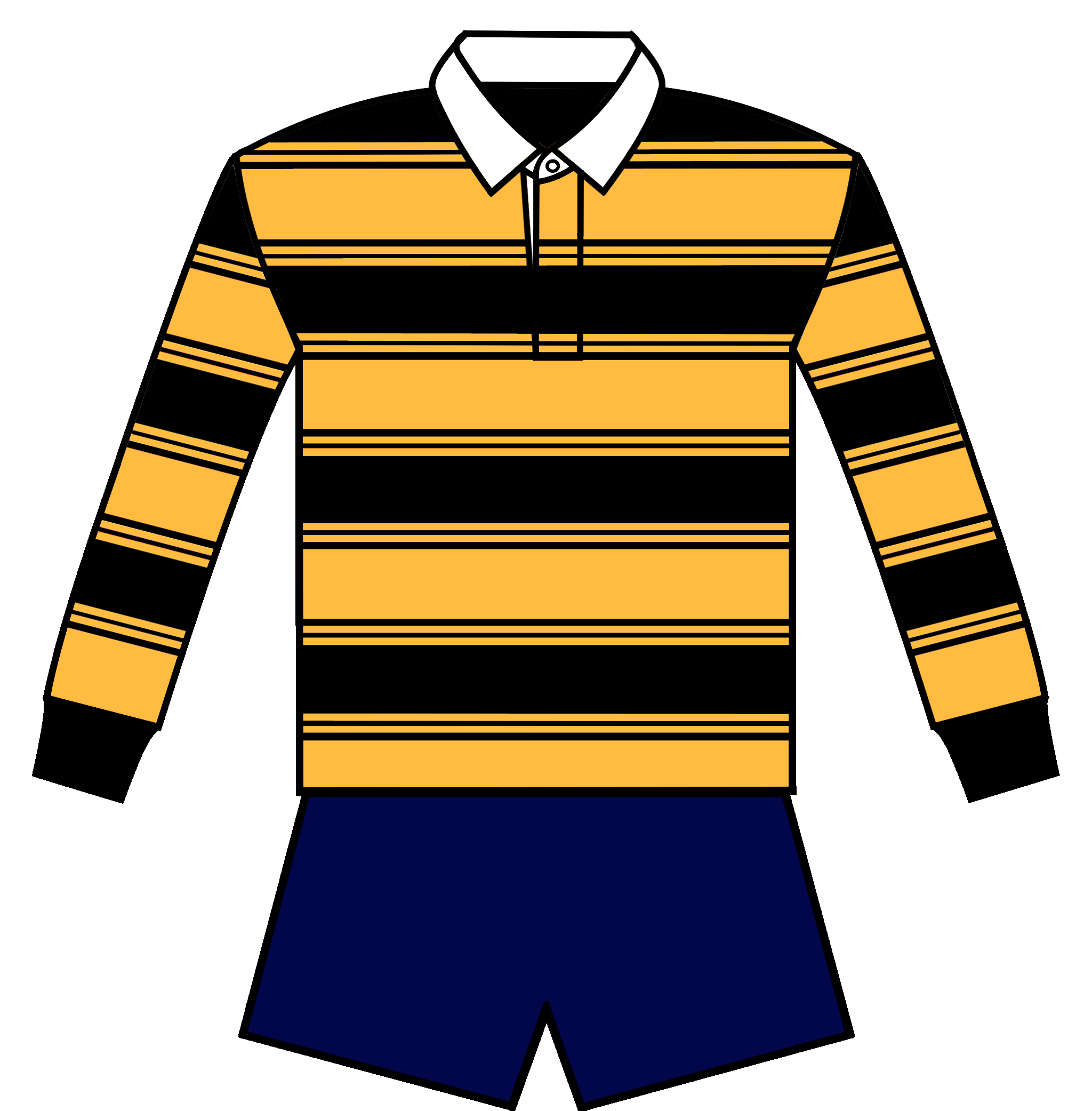
Balmain 42nd season Ground: Leichhardt Oval; Coach: Athol Smith; Captain: Fred de Belin

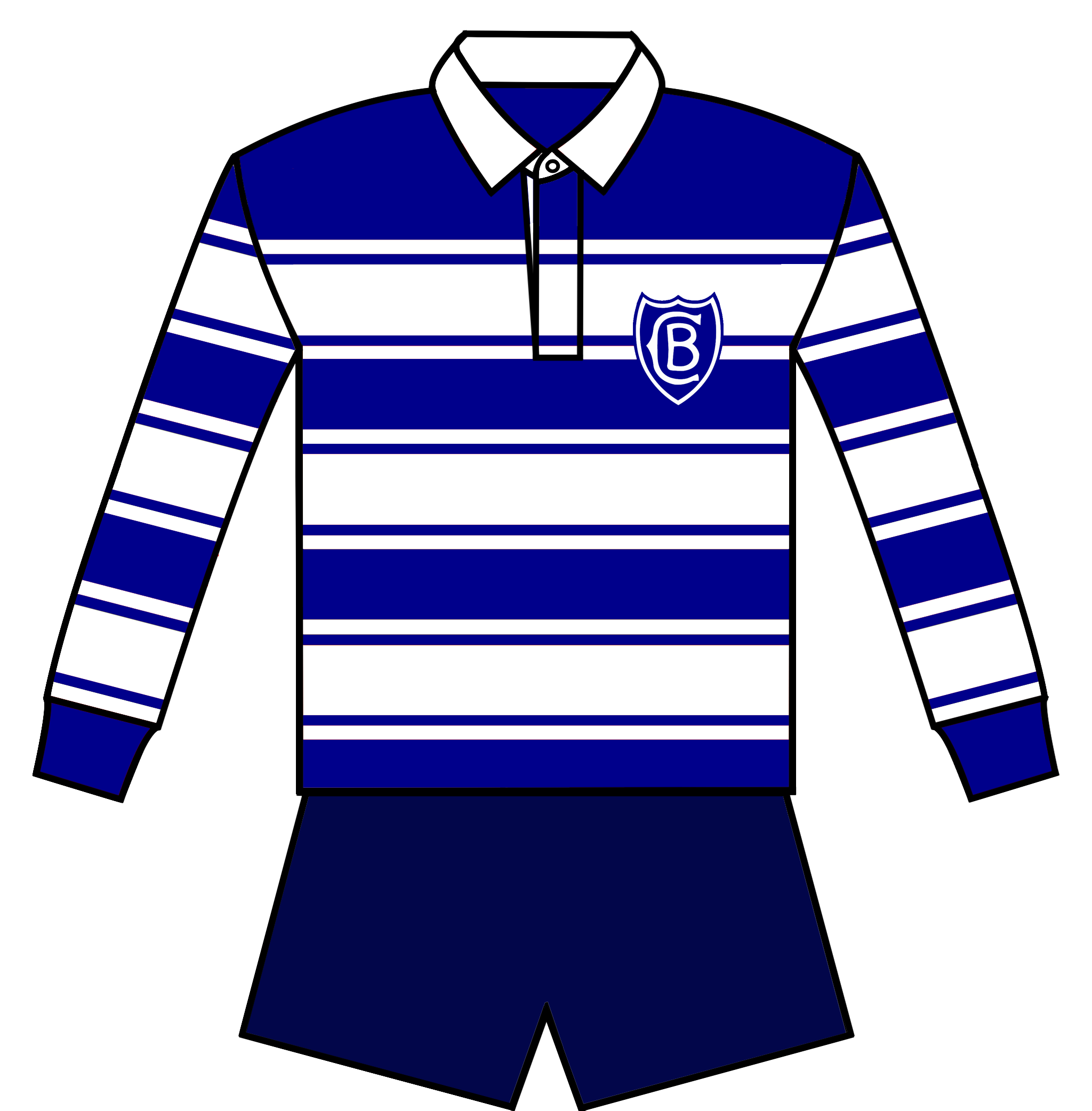
Canterbury-Bankstown 15th season Ground:Belmore Oval; Coach: Henry Porter; Captain: Bruce Hopkins

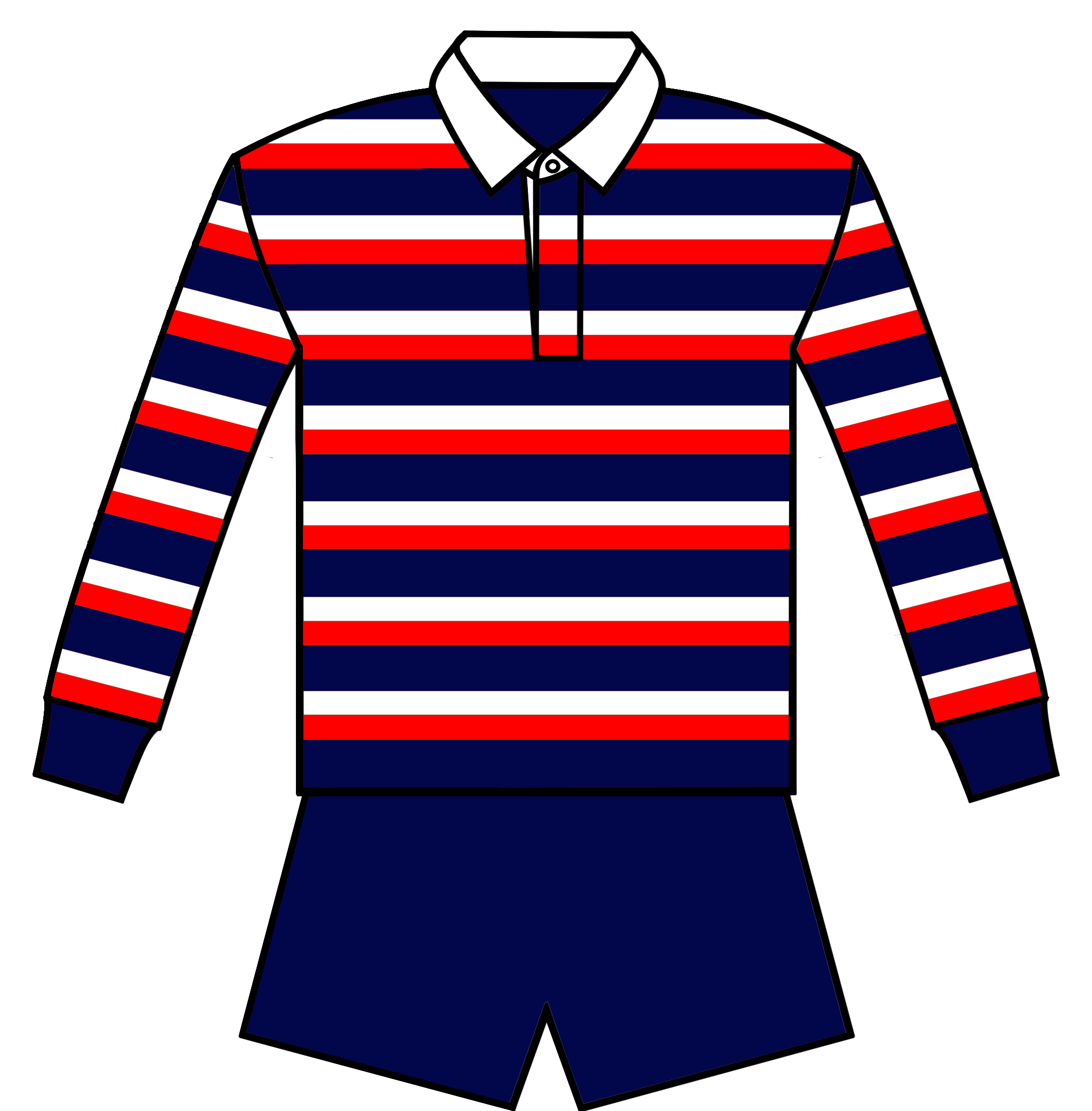
Eastern Suburbs 42nd season Ground: Sydney Sports Ground; Coach: Ray Stehr; Captain: Paul Tierney

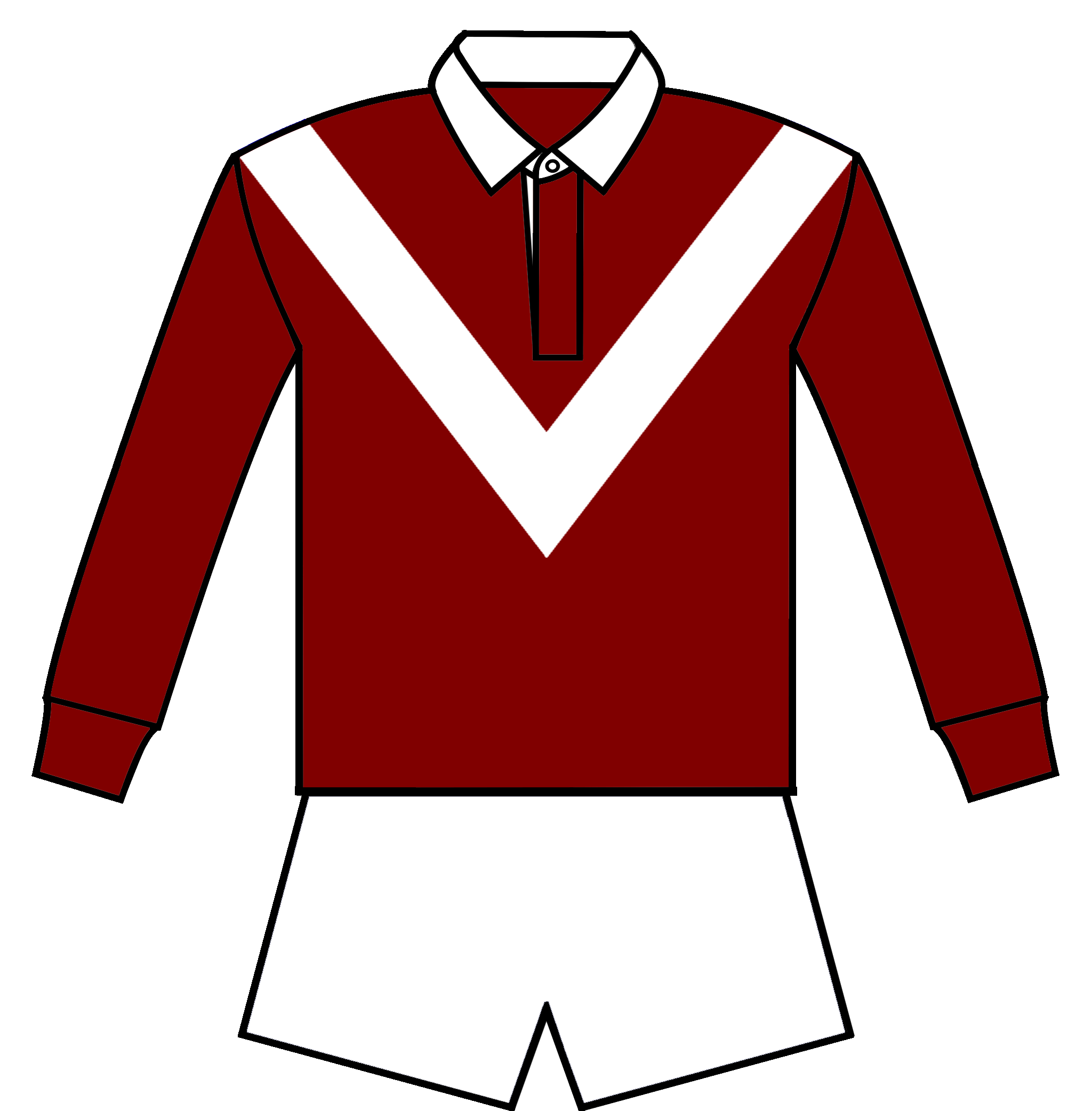
Manly-Warringah 3rd season Ground: Brookvale Oval; Coach: George Mullins; Captain: George Hunter

Newtown 42nd season Ground: Erskineville Oval; Captain-Coach: Frank Farrell

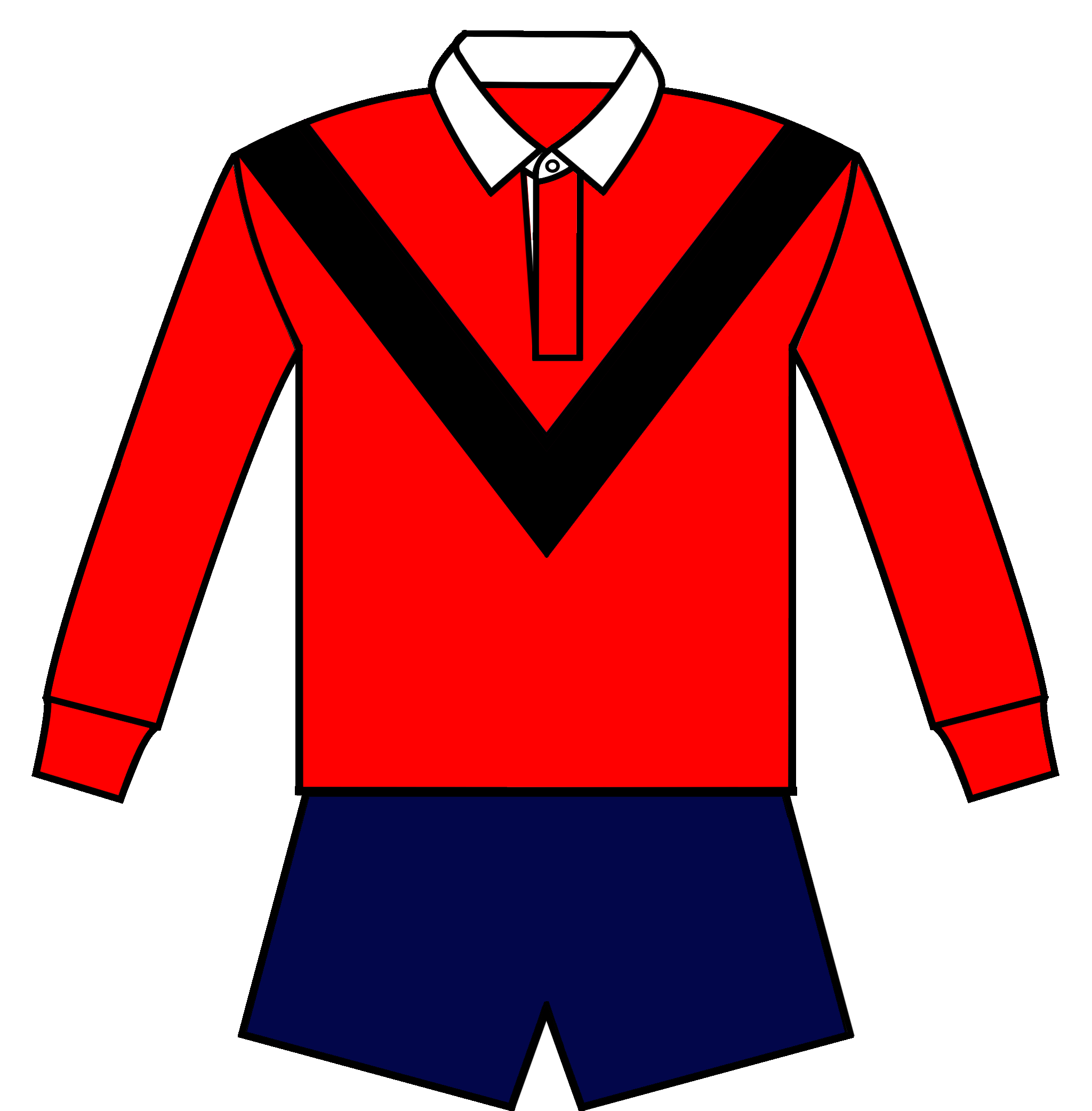
North Sydney 42nd season Ground: North Sydney Oval; Coach: Harry McKinnon; Captain: Frank Cottle

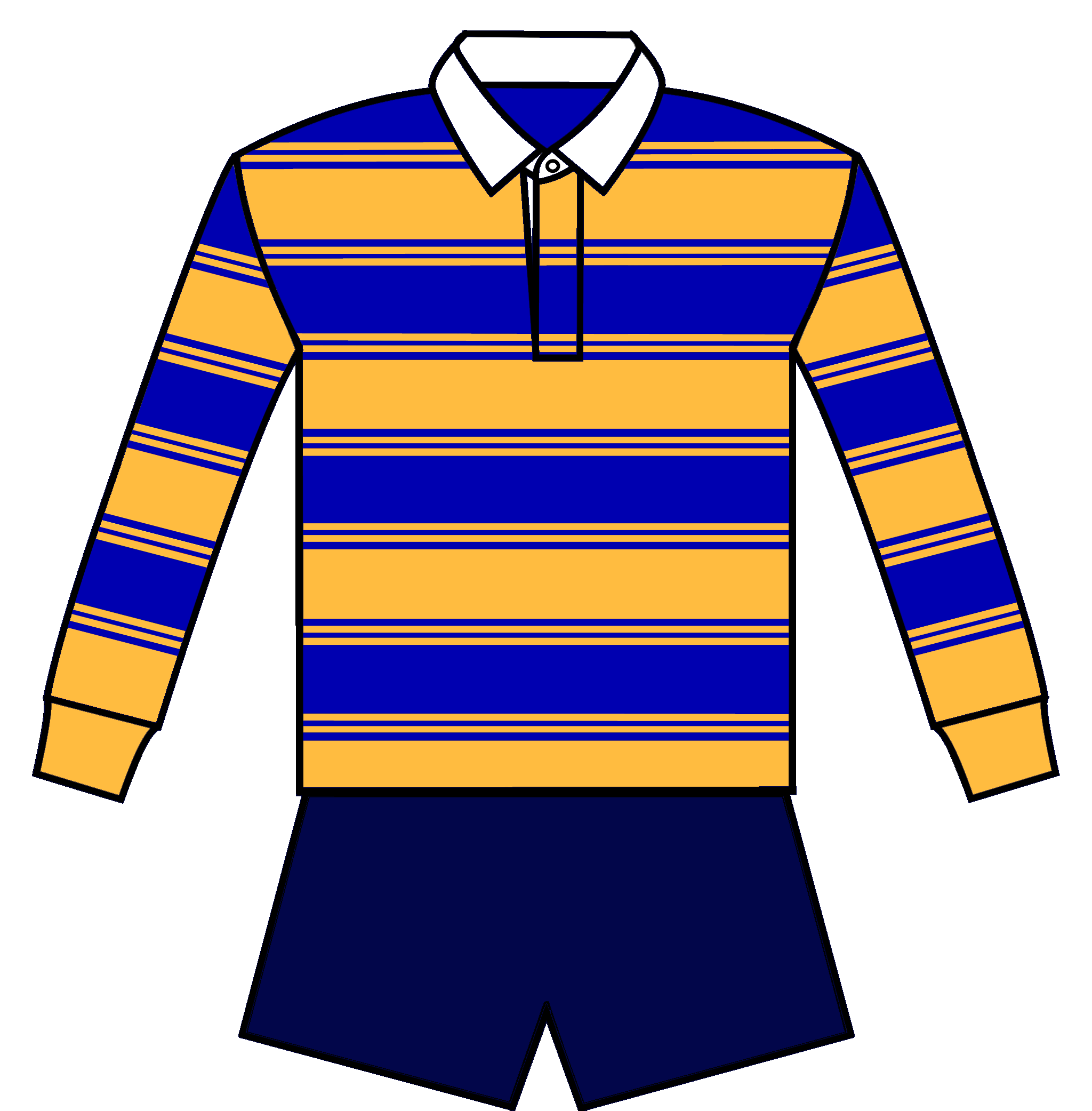
Parramatta 3rd season Ground: Cumberland Oval; Captain-Coach: Vic Hey

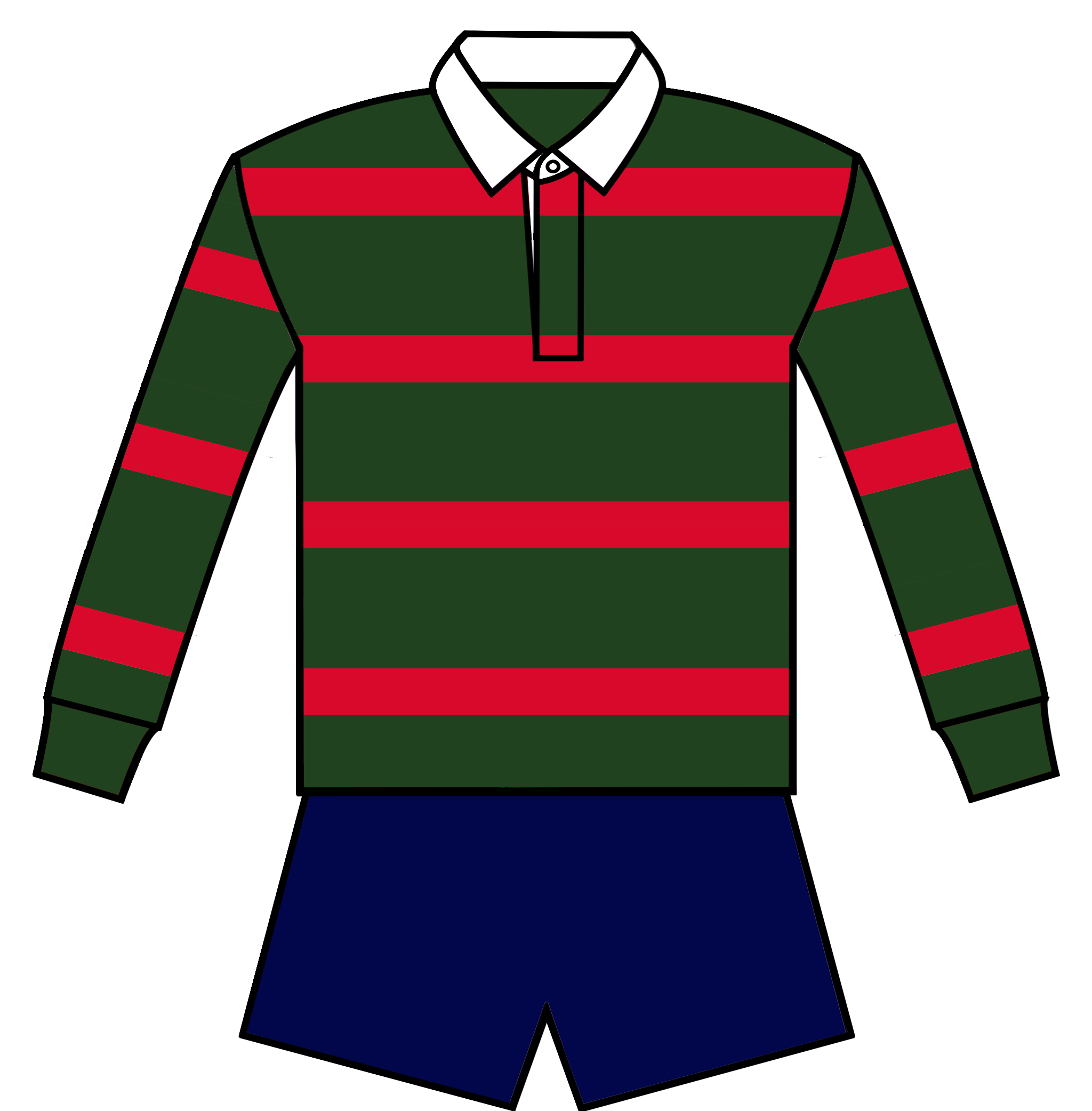
South Sydney 42nd season Ground: Redfern Oval; Coach: Dave Watson & Jack Rayner; Captain: Jack Rayner

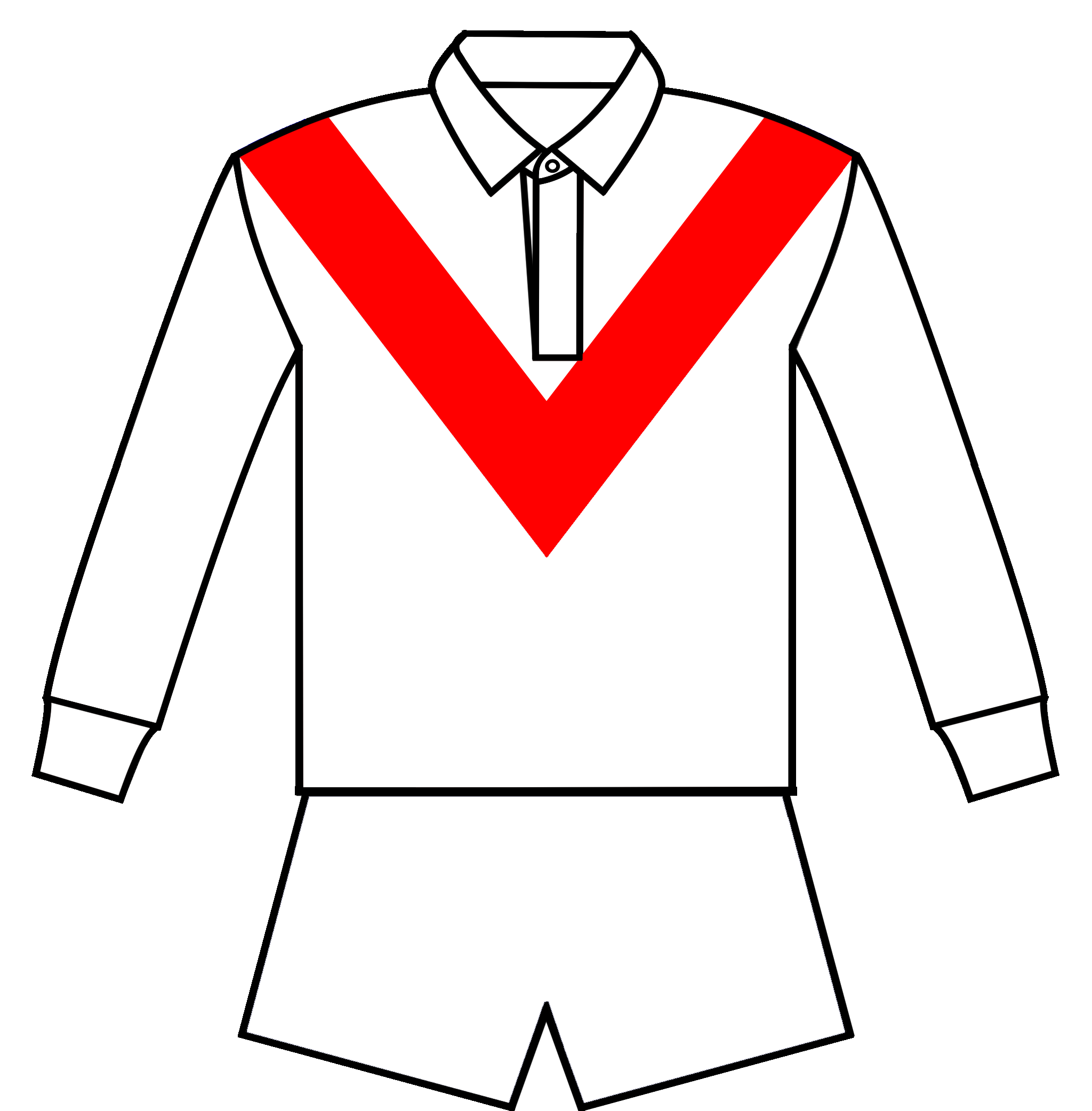
St. George 29th season Ground: Hurstville Oval; Coach: Jim Duckworth; Captain: Johnny Hawke

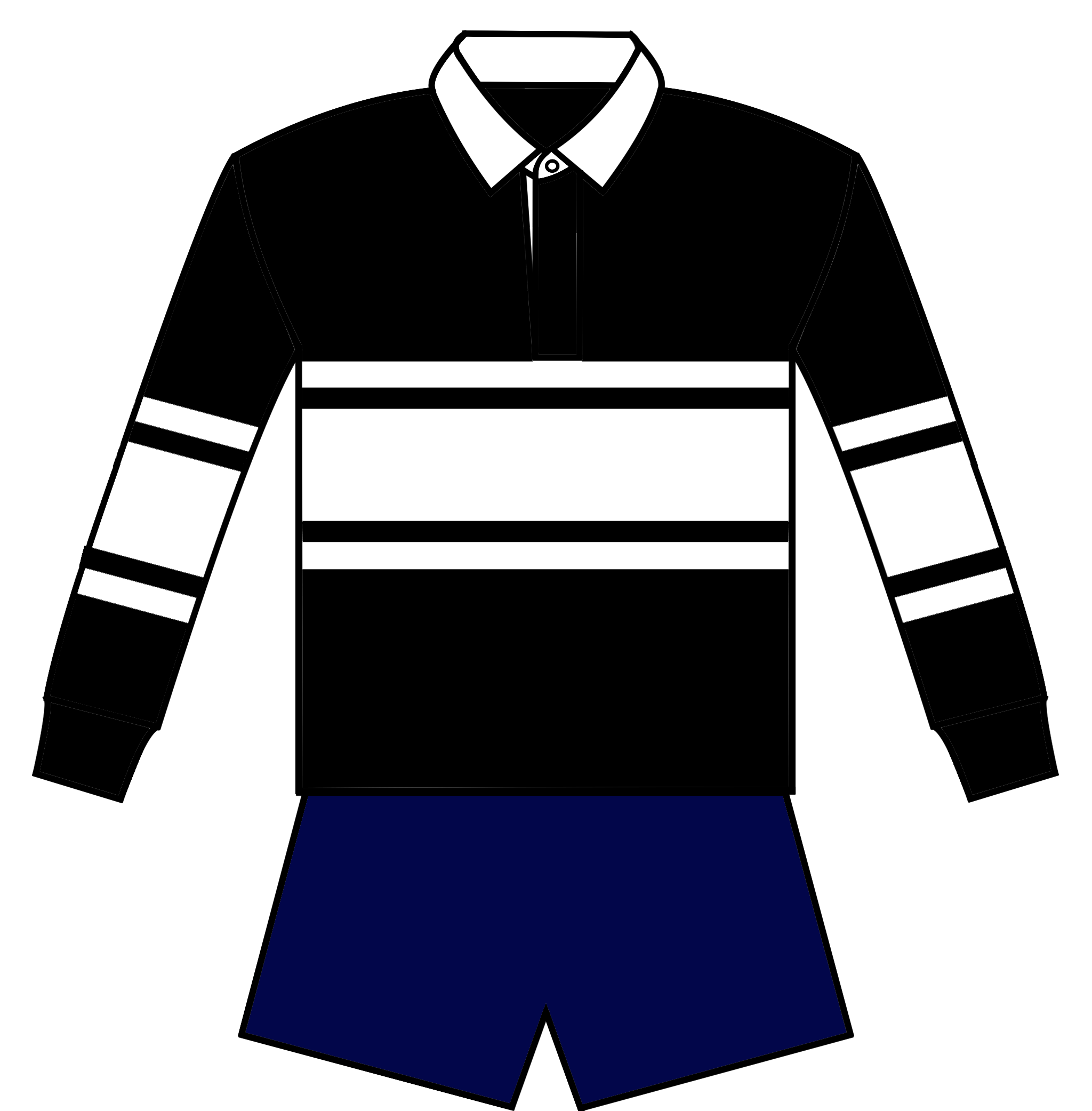
Western Suburbs 42nd season Ground: Pratten Park; Captain-Coach: Col Maxwell

=== Ladder ===
	Team	Pld	W	D	L	PF	PA	PD	Pts
1	South Sydney	18	13	1	4	360	210	+150	27
2	Western Suburbs	18	12	0	6	365	280	+85	24
3	St. George	18	11	1	6	345	231	+114	23
4	Balmain	18	10	2	6	265	206	+59	22
5	Parramatta	18	8	4	6	311	269	+42	20
6	Newtown	18	9	1	8	358	332	+26	19
7	Canterbury	18	6	2	10	236	337	−101	14
8	Manly	18	6	1	11	171	293	−122	13
9	North Sydney	18	5	1	12	253	369	−116	11
10	Eastern Suburbs	18	3	1	14	214	351	−137	7

== Finals ==
Minor premier South Sydney's loss to St. George in the finals meant that a grand final would be necessary.

Home	Score	Away	Match Information
Home	Score	Away	Date and Time	Venue	Referee	Crowd
Semifinals
South Sydney	12–16	St. George	20 August 1949	Sydney Cricket Ground	Tom McMahon	41,696
Western Suburbs	13–20	Balmain	27 August 1949	Sydney Cricket Ground	George Bishop	38,209
Preliminary Final
St. George	18–7	Balmain	3 September 1949	Sydney Cricket Ground	Jack O'Brien	55,341
Grand Final
South Sydney	12–19	St. George	10 September 1949	Sydney Cricket Ground	George Bishop	56,534

=== Grand Final ===
South Sydney	Position	St. George
13. Clive Churchill	FB	26. Doug Fleming
12. John Graves	WG	11. Ron Roberts
42. Norm Spillane	CE	10. Doug McRitchie
27. Ken Brogan	CE	9. Matt McCoy
14. Len Allmond	WG	13. Noel Pidding
46. Arthur Moynihan	FE	8. Johnny Hawke (capt)
7. Des Bryan	HB	7. Noel Hill
1. Denis Donoghue	PR	3. Jack Holland
29. Ernie Hammerton	HK	2. Frank Facer (v.capt)
28. Jack Melville	PR	54. Jack Munn
5. Bernie Purcell	SR	16. Carl Langton
4. Jack Rayner (Ca./Co.)	SR	4. Charles Banks
6. Les Cowie	LK	6. George Jardine
	Coach	Jim Duckworth

In a brutal encounter, St George ran in five tries and overcame minor premiers South Sydney 19–12 to claim their second premiership in front of 56,532 people, the second biggest crowd of all time to witness a Sydney club match.

Souths opened the scoring, with a converted try to Graves after 21 minutes. However the Dragons were led masterfully by their captain, Kangaroos five-eighth, Norman "Johnny" Hawke. Controlling all aspects of the match, Hawke took the game away from Souths who only got back into the contest when he was forced from the field with injury. Also injured was Saints forward George Jardine who played the match with a broken wrist.

St. George led 11–5 at half time. Hawke returned to the field after treatment and was later dubbed "Man of the Match" and "the Player’s Player". The Dragons' wingers, season's top try scorer Ron Roberts (25 tries) and newcomer Noel Pidding scored two tries each.

Each of the grand final winning players received a record bonus of £300 each.

St. George 19
Tries: Roberts (2), Pidding (2), McCoy
Goals: McCoy, Pidding

South Sydney 12
Tries: Graves, Purcell
Goals: Graves (3)

== Player statistics ==
The following statistics are as of the conclusion of Round 18.

Top 5 point scorers

Points	Player	Tries	Goals	Field Goals
159	Bill Keato	1	78	0
122	Matt McCoy	8	49	0
110	Ron Crossley	4	49	0
100	Darcy Russell	0	50	0
92	Bobby Lulham	16	22	0

Top 5 try scorers

Tries	Player
21	Ron Roberts
18	Mitchell Wallace
17	Len Allmond
16	Bobby Lulham
14	Horrie Kessey

Top 5 goal scorers

Goals	Player
78	Bill Keato
50	Darcy Russell
49	Matt McCoy
49	Ron Crossley
44	Colin Schomberg
