= Charlie Banks =

Charlie Banks may refer to:

- Charlie Banks (rugby league) (born 1923), Australian rugby league player
- Charlie Banks (One Life to Live), a fictional character on the ABC soap opera One Life to Live
- Charlie Banks, a fictional baseball player for the New York Giants in the novel Last Days of Summer
- Charlie Banks, a fictional character from the Ghost Whisperer

== See also ==
- Charles Banks (disambiguation)
