= Charles Banks =

Charles Banks may refer to:

- Charles Arthur Banks (1885–1961), Lieutenant-Governor of British Columbia
- Charles C. Banks (1893–1971), World War I flying ace
- Charles Eugene Banks (1852–1932), American newspaper editor and writer
- Charles L. Banks (1914–1988), United States Marine Corps general
- Charles Banks (businessman) (1873–1923) American bank founder, businessman
- Charles Edward Banks (1854–1931), American medical doctor, and historian and genealogist of colonial New England
- Charlie Banks (rugby league) (born 1923), Scottish-born Australian rugby league player
- Charlie Banks (One Life to Live), a fictional character on the ABC soap opera One Life to Live
- Charles Banks, co-owner of Screaming Eagle Winery and Vineyards

== See also ==
- Charles Banks Wilson (1918–2013), American artist
- Charlie Banks (disambiguation)
