= Johnny Hawke =

Australia international rugby league footballer and coach

Personal information
- Full name: Norman John Hawke
- Born: 7 May 1925 Queanbeyan, New South Wales, Australia
- Died: 10 January 1992 (aged 66) Canberra, Australian Capital Territory, Australia

Playing information
- Position: Centre, Five-eighth
Club
Years	Team	Pld	T	G	FG	P
1946	Queanbeyan
1947	Canberra
1949–52	St. George	56	8	3	0	30
	Total	56	8	3	0	30
Representative
Years	Team	Pld	T	G	FG	P
1948	NSW Country	2	0	0	0	0
1949–51	New South Wales	6	1	0	0	3
1948–49	Australia	4	0	0	0	0
1949–50	NSW City	2	3	0	0	9

Coaching information
Club
Years	Team	Gms	W	D	L	W%
1951–52	St. George	36	23	1	12	64
	Kyogle
	Woy Woy
	Total	36	23	1	12	64

Norman John "Johnny" Hawke (1925 – 10 January 1992) was an Australian rugby league footballer who played in the 1940s, and 1950s. An Australian international and New South Wales interstate representative back, he played club football in the ACT as well as in Sydney for St. George Dragons, whom he captained and won a premiership with in 1949.

== Background ==
Hawke was born in Queanbeyan, New South Wales in 1925. At an early age, he displayed enormous sporting talent. Like many young sportsmen of the time, he played Australian rules football on Saturday and rugby league on Sunday.

== Rugby league career ==
=== Early years ===
In 1940 at the age of 15, Hawke played first grade for the Queanbeyan Blues rugby league team and Queanbeyan Tigers Australian football team. After leaving school, he started work at Commonwealth Government Printing Office. He transferred to the Eastlake Football Club as many of the Printing Office staff played for that club. He won Eastlake's best and fairest award in 1945 and in 1946 he captained the team. Eastlake lost the 1946 Grand Final after being undefeated during the year. Hawke played for the Queanbeyan Blues in 1946 but transferred to play in Canberra in 1947. In 1948, he received several inducements to leave but remained playing in the local competition for 6 pounds per week. During 1948, Hawke was selected for Monaro, Country and New South Wales. He used up all his leave entitlements from the Printing Office and as a result did not have any leave left to play in the final selection game, New South Wales versus Queensland in Brisbane. Even though his leave application was rejected, he went and played in the game but the consequence was that the Printing Office dismissed him on his return to work. Hawke was selected for the 1948–49 Kangaroo tour of Great Britain and France and left Canberra in August 1948 with a gift of just over 10 pounds from the Canberra Rugby League. He played four Tests against Great Britain and France during the tour, as five-eighth and centre, scoring 11 tries and playing 23 out of the 37 games.

=== St. George ===
Upon the tour's return, he signed with the St. George Dragons for the 1949 NSWRFL season and was appointed captain at the age of 24. In the 1949 semi-final against South Sydney, he suffered a broken upper jaw and cracked teeth after a heavy tackle by Jack Rayner. He remained on the field and set up the winning try to winger Ron Roberts. Three weeks later, he led the Saints to premiership victory and played a leading role in the 19-12 Grand final win over South Sydney. Mid-season 1949, he was selected to go on the 1949 Kangaroo tour of New Zealand, making another Test appearance.

During the 1950 Great Britain Lions tour, he was in the running for the Ashes series captaincy but injured his knee in the visiting team's tour match against New South Wales at the SCG which drew a record crowd of over 70,419 and made no further rep appearances that year. He made a career total of six state representative appearances for New South Wales and captained the side.

Hawke captained-coached St. George in the premiership seasons of 1951 and 1952, and in 1951 made his final test appearance during the 1951 France rugby league tour of Australia and New Zealand, also playig for Sydney and New South Wales against the French.. In 1952, he suffered a slipped disc that led to him being in plaster from neck to thighs. Injury led to his career at St. George being curtailed at the end of the 1952 NSWRFL season.

=== Later years ===
Hawke left St. George to take a captain-coach role at Kyogle, New South Wales and the team won the premiership in his first year as coach. He left Kyogle to coach at Woy Woy. Hawke returned to Canberra in 1956.

Hawke died of Parkinson's disease on 10 January 1992 at the age of 66. He was married to Joan for 46 years. After his death, he was inducted into the Australian Capital Territory Sports Hall of Fame.
