= Ron Griffiths =

Ron Griffiths may refer to:

- Ronald Griffiths, Australian rugby league football coach
- Ron Griffiths (rugby league) (1924–1970), Australian rugby league footballer
