= Jack Munn =

Australian rugby league footballer

Jack Warren Munn

Personal information
- Full name: Jack Warren Munn
- Born: 30 May 1921; Maroubra, New South Wales, Australia
- Died: 25 June 1993 (aged 72); Jannali, New South Wales, Australia

Playing information
- Position: Prop
Club
Years	Team	Pld	T	G	FG	P
1946–49,1951	St. George	42	8	1	0	26
Representative
Years	Team	Pld	T	G	FG	P
1946	New South Wales	2	0	0	0	0
1950	Queensland	1	0	0	0	0

Jack Warren Munn (1921–1993) was an Australian rugby league player who played in the 1940s and 1950s in the New South Wales premiership competition and was a state representative.

== Career ==
Munn was a prop-forward who played with St. George immediately after World War II. After his discharge from the AIF, Jack Munn joined St George and played five seasons between 1946-1949 and 1951.

He moved the Queensland in 1950, and represented Queensland against New South Wales in that year before returning to St George. Munn scored a try in the club's 1946 Grand final loss to Balmain.

He won a premiership with St. George when he played prop in the 1949 Grand Final. In 1950, Munn accepted a captain coach role for Ingham, Queensland and consequentially played representative football for Queensland. in 1950 and only a bad injury stopped him from playing for the Kangaroos.

== Death ==
Munn died on 25 June 1993, aged 72.

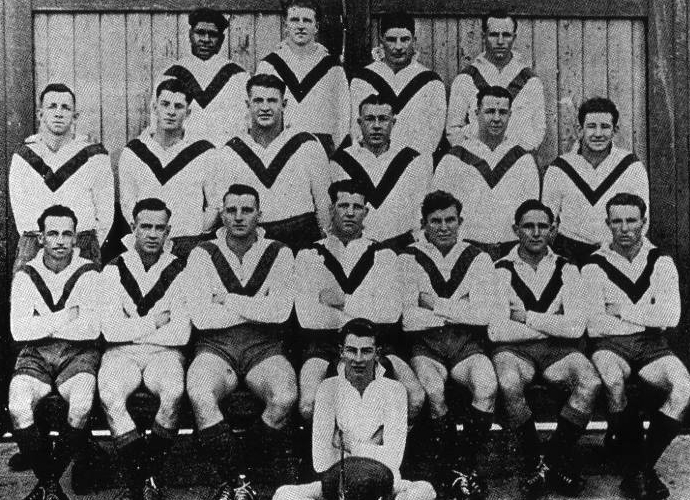
Munn (middle row, 3rd from left) in StGeorge's 1946 side - minor premiers
