= Matt McCoy (rugby league) =

Australia international rugby league footballer and coach

Personal information
- Full name: Matthew Phillip McCoy
- Born: 20 December 1923 Wolumla, New South Wales, Australia
- Died: 20 February 2007 (aged 83) Baulkham Hills, New South Wales, Australia

Playing information
- Weight: 14 st 0 lb (89 kg)
- Position: Centre
Club
Years	Team	Pld	T	G	FG	P
1945	Eastern Suburbs	2	0	2	0	2
1947	Bega		17	33
1948–52	St. George	67	26	66	8	208
1954	Fitzroy
1955–56	Leeton
1957	Fitzroy
1958	Brothers
1959	Centrals
	Total	69	43	101	8	210
Representative
Years	Team	Pld	T	G	FG	P
1947	NSW Country	1	0	2	0	4
1949–51	NSW City	2	0	9	0	18
1949–51	New South Wales	5	2	15	0	36
1949	Australia	2	2	1	0	8
1954	Central Queensland		0	3	0	6

Matt McCoy (20 December 1923 – 20 February 2007) was an Australian professional rugby league footballer who played in the 1940s and 1950s, and an inductee of the St. George Illawarra Dragons Hall of Fame. An Australian international and New South Wales interstate representative goal-kicking centre, he played in Sydney's New South Wales Rugby Football League for the St. George club, with whom he won the 1949 NSWRFL Premiership. McCoy also played for Sydney's Eastern Suburbs club, and in Country New South Wales and Queensland as a captain-coach, representing both City and Country New South Wales, as well as Central Queensland during his career.

== Playing career ==
Originally from Wolumla, New South Wales where he broke into the first grade rugby league team at age 15, during World War II he served as an anti-aircraft gunner and played rugby league in Darwin. After a car accident which resulted in a serious eye injury, McCoy was relocated to Sydney and started playing first grade football in the New South Wales Rugby Football League for the Eastern Suburbs club during the 1945 NSWRFL season. After the war ended he returned to the South Coast where he captain-coached Bega Roosters to premiership honours and in 1947 represented Country New South Wales against City at the Sydney Cricket Ground before a crowd of 50,000.

McCoy returned to Sydney and started playing for St. George from the 1948 NSWRFL season and in the final games of the season he captained the club. He was selected to play representative football for City NSW, kicking seven goals against Country in pouring rain in 1949. Later that year he played for St. George in the 1949 NSWRFL season's grand final at centre, scoring a try and kicking a goal in their 19–12 victory against South Sydney. After that McCoy was selected 1949 Kangaroo tour of New Zealand with the Australian national team, becoming Kangaroo No. 268 and appearing in both Test matches, scoring the match-winning try in the second one to level the series. He was the tour's top points scorer with 55 from 7 games.

A knee injury cut short McCoy's time with St. George and he didn't play any football in 1953, instead coaching St George's juniors to win their competition. After that he would play the remainder of his career as a captain-coach, moving to Queensland and joining Rockhampton's Fitzroy club. During the 1954 Great Britain Lions tour McCoy played for Central Queensland against the British in Rockhampton, kicking 3 goals. The following year McCoy played in the Riverina for Leeton's club. In 1957 he returned to Rockhampton with Fitzroy and the following year joined the Christian Brothers club. McCoy's final year of playing was in 1959 with Townsville's Centrals club.

== Post playing ==
Following his football career, McCoy had a successful career in Sydney's cricketing competition as a batsman. In March 2004 a Legends Walk at Kogarah Oval was opened, with 16 club greats, including McCoy, inducted into a hall of fame. McCoy died in hospital at Baulkham Hills, New South Wales on 20 February 2007. In 2008, the centenary year of rugby league in Australia, McCoy was named in the Queensland Rugby League Central Division's team of the century.
