= Wolumla =

- Town
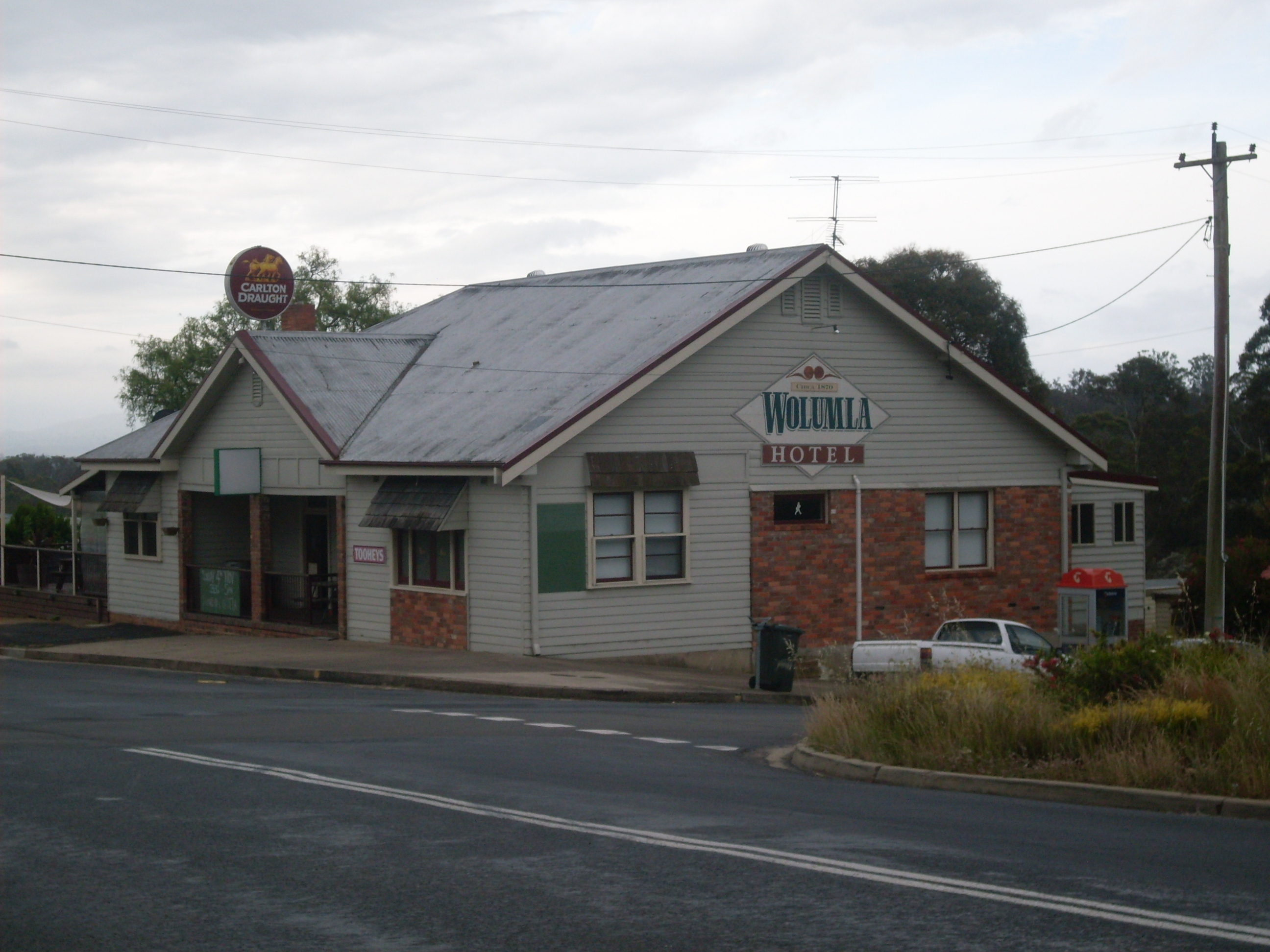
- Wolumla Railway Junction Hotel, named after the proposed railway that would have passed through the village.

- Coordinates: 36°50′00″S 149°48′30″E
- Country: Australia
- State: New South Wales
- LGA: Bega Valley Shire

Government
  - State electorate: Bega
  - Federal division: Eden-Monaro

Population
  - Total: 703 (2016 census)
- Postcode: 2550

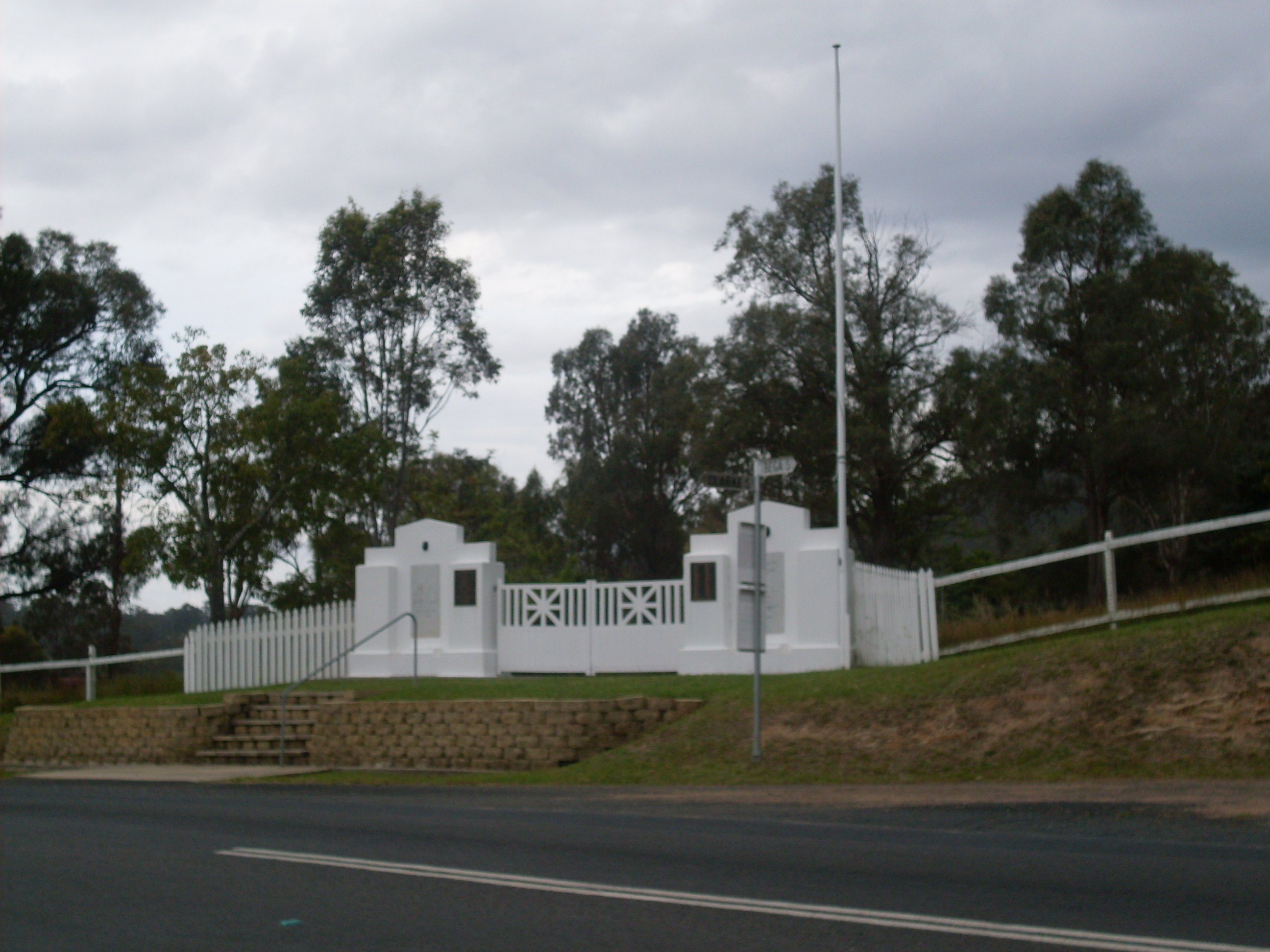
Wolumla Memorial Gates

Wolumla is an historical locality in New South Wales, Australia located 234km south of Canberra, between Bega and Merimbula. Wolumla is located on the hilly coastal hinterland near the headwaters of Frogs Hollow Creek, and has been predominantly cleared for beef, dairy and sheep grazing. At the 2016 census, Wolumla had a population of 703.

Wolumla receives a small tourist influx during peak holiday periods. The township consists of predominantly low-density urban housing with a very small commercial area located on the main street.

Gold was discovered very near the town in 1896.

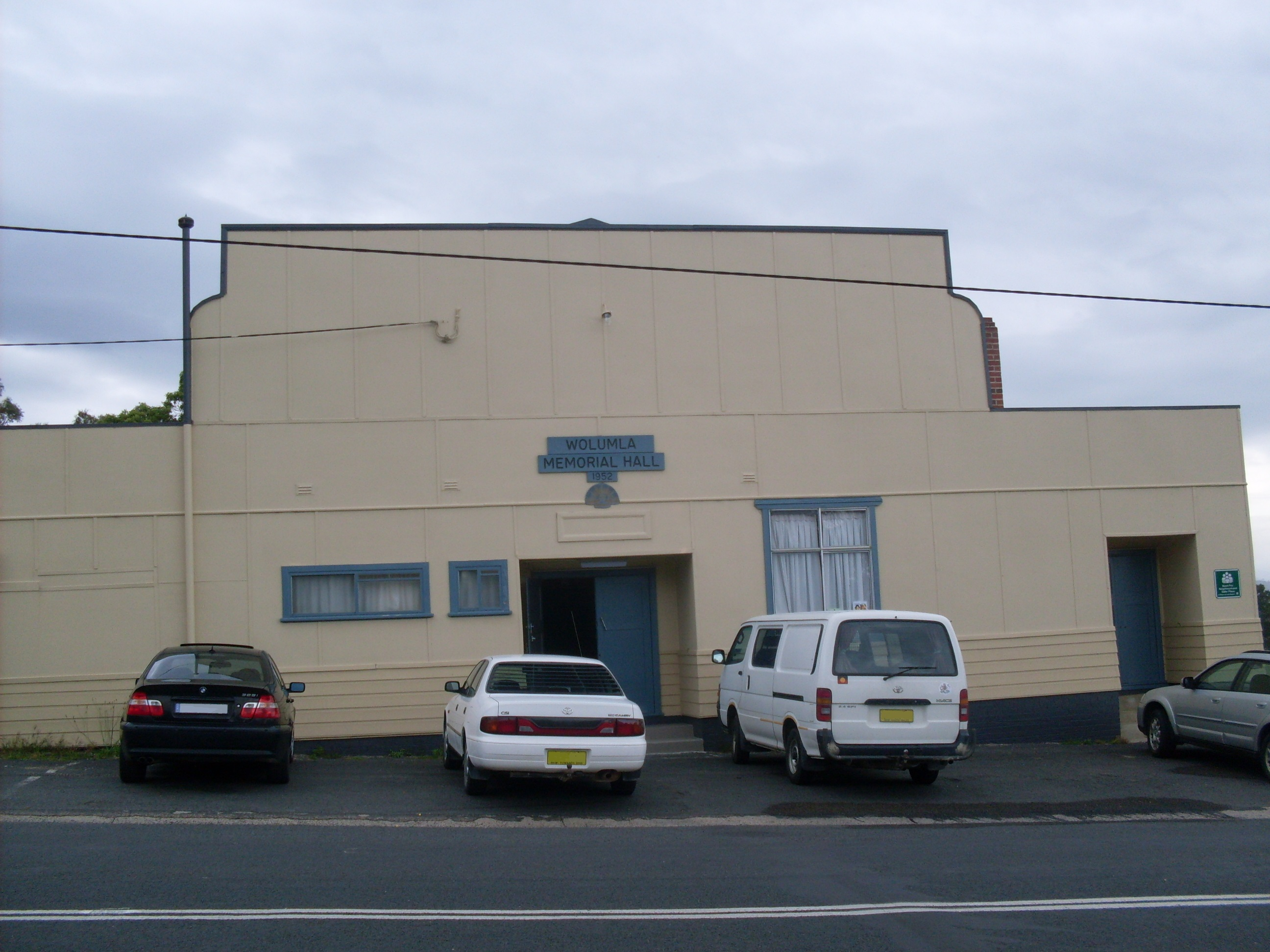
Wolumla Memorial Hall

== Facilities ==
Wolumla's small commercial area consists of a hotel/pub, a hairdresser, and a general store which doubles as a newsagent and post office. The main street also houses the volunteer-run Rural Fire Service station and a community memorial hall.

Wolumla has a public school for kindergarten to year 6, established in 1882, and an Anglican church.

The town is serviced by the South East and Tablelands bus network route 890, which runs between Eden, Merimbula, and Bega several times a day.

Wolumla is the site for a National Broadband Network (NBN) satellite ground station consisting of four 13.5m dishes.

== Spanish flu ==
In 1918, the Wolumla Vigilance Committee applied traveling restrictions to people from Bega in an attempt to cut off potential transmission of the Spanish flu. After an initial request was declined, the requested the state Premier intervene, who acted accordingly. The Wolumla Vigilance Committee established a checkpoint on the Bega side of town, and travelers approaching were asked to provide papers. This action was widely reported in other districts, with Wolumla considered one of the strictest locations in the country in their efforts to keep out the disease. During the pandemic the township was largely spared infection.

== Notable people ==
Notable people who come from or who have lived in Wolumla include:

- Matt McCoy, Australian rugby league international
- Jon Stanhope, Australian politician
