= George Jardine (rugby league) =

Australian rugby league footballer

Personal information
- Full name: George Jardine
- Born: 8 November 1926 Helensburgh, New South Wales, Australia
- Died: 29 May 2015 (aged 88) Jannali, New South Wales, Australia

Playing information
- Position: Prop
Club
Years	Team	Pld	T	G	FG	P
1947–52	St. George	60	9	1	0	27

George Jardine (8 November 1926 - 29 May 2015) was an Australian rugby league footballer who played in the 1940s and 1950s. Jardine played in the New South Wales premiership competition and won a premiership with St. George in 1949.

== Career ==
A Wollongong, New South Wales junior, Jardine played five seasons for St. George between 1947-1950 and 1952. He became a premiership winner when he played at lock-forward in 1949 Grand Final win over South Sydney. After playing 70 grade games for St George, George Jardine returned to the Illawarra league in 1953 joining the Northern Suburbs Wollongong club. He also had a long association with the Helensburgh Tigers rugby league football club.
