= Alan de Belin =

Australian rower

Personal information
- Nationality: Australian
- Born: 15 April 1954
- Died: 22 August 1986 (aged 32)
- Father: Fred de Belin
- Relatives: Jack de Belin (nephew)

Sport
- Country: Australia
- Sport: Rowing
- Club: UTS Haberfield Rowing Club
Medal record
Representing Australia
World Rowing Championships
Bronze medal – third place	1977 Amsterdam	M8+

Alan de Belin (15 April 1954 – 22 August 1986) was an Australian rower. He was an Australian national champion and won a bronze medal at the 1977 World Rowing Championships.

== Club and state rowing ==
de Belin's senior rowing was initially from the UTS Haberfield Rowing Club.

State representation first came for de Belin in 1977 in the New South Wales lightweight four contesting the Penrith Cup at the Interstate Regatta within the Australian Rowing Championships. He rowed again the New South Wales lightweight four at the Interstate Regatta in 1978. Both crews placed second.

In 1977 and 1978 in Haberfield colours, de Belin contested Australian championship titles at the Australian Rowing Championships in the lightweight four and the lightweight eight.

== International representative rowing ==
de Belin made his Australian representative debut at the 1977 World Rowing Championships in Amsterdam in the Australian men's lightweight eight. That eight won a bronze medal with de Belin in the six seat.

== Sporting family ==
de Belin's father Fred de Belin had a Sydney first grade career with the Balmain Tigers that was interrupted by four years of WWII active service in Europe with the RAAF as bomber. He toured with the Kangaroos of 1948–49 and played eight Tests for Australia from 1948–50.

Alan's nephew Jack de Belin started his Australian professional rugby league career with the St George Illawarra Dragons under-20s team in 2011. By 2018 Jack had played 150 National Rugby League first grade games and that year made state selection for New South Wales in the State of Origin series.
