= Jack de Belin =

PNG international rugby league footballer (born 1991)

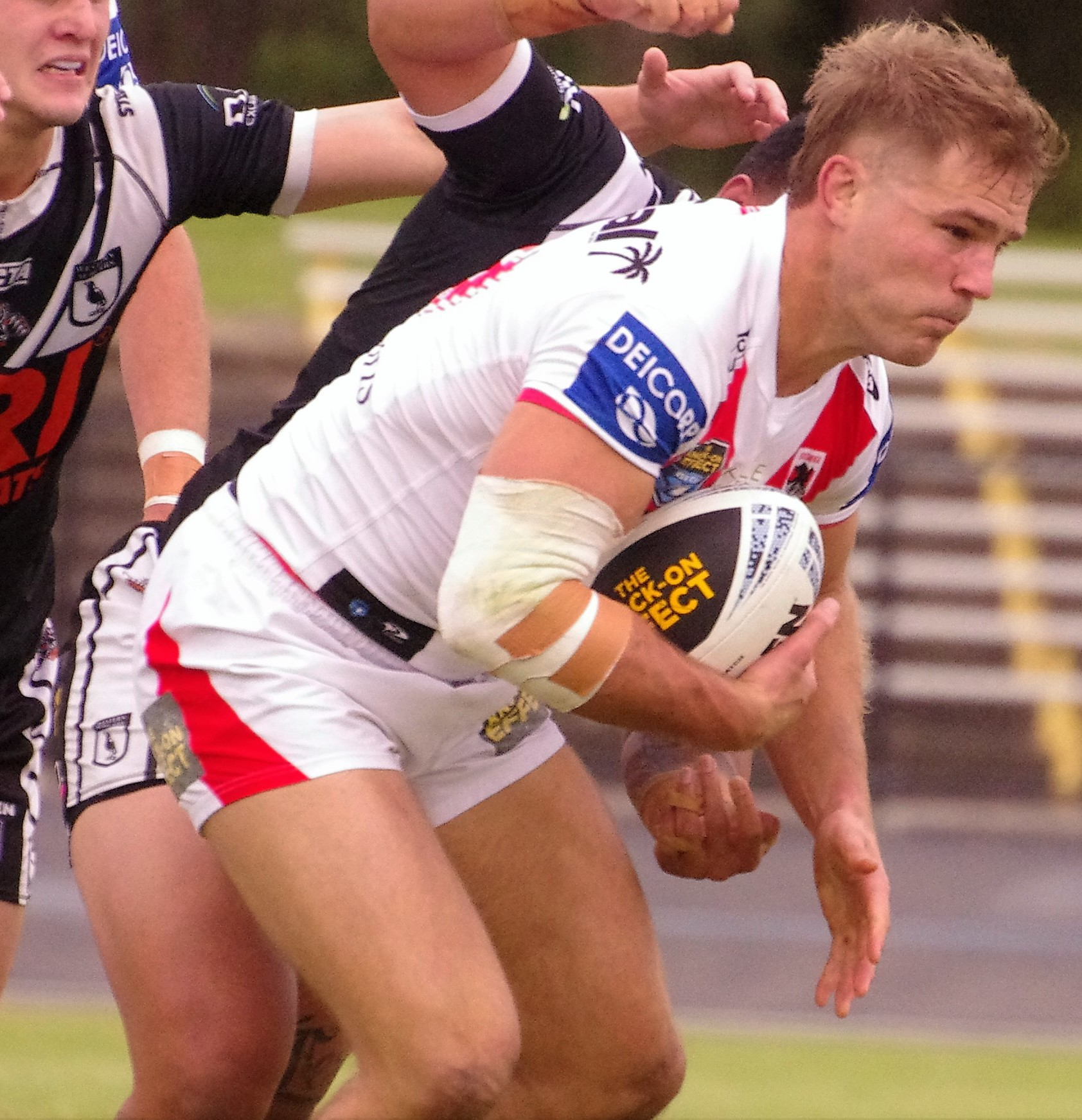

Personal information
- Full name: Jack de Belin
- Born: 17 March 1991 (age 35) Cootamundra, New South Wales, Australia
- Height: 188 cm (6 ft 2 in)
- Weight: 105 kg (16 st 7 lb)

Playing information
- Position: Lock, Prop
Club
Years	Team	Pld	T	G	FG	P
2011–25	St. George Illawarra	252	19	0	0	76
2026	Parramatta Eels	18	0	0	0	0
	Total	270	19	0	0	76
Representative
Years	Team	Pld	T	G	FG	P
2016–17	Country NSW	2	1	0	0	4
2018	New South Wales	3	0	0	0	0
2023–	Papua New Guinea	10	0	0	0	0
2025	PNG Prime Minister's XIII	1	0	0	0	0
- Source: As of 17 November 2026
- Education: St Gregory's College, Campbelltown
- Relatives: Fred de Belin (grandfather); Alan de Belin (uncle)

Jack de Belin (born 17 March 1991) is a Papua New Guinea international rugby league footballer who plays as a lock and prop for the Parramatta Eels in the National Rugby League.

De Belin also played for Country NSW, and New South Wales in the 2018 State of Origin series.

== Personal life ==
De Belin was born in Cootamundra, New South Wales, Australia and was played for the Cootamundra Bulldogs in Group 9 as junior club.

De Belin's grandfather Fred de Belin, was an Australian professional rugby league footballer and RAAF Flying Officer. De Belin's uncle Alan de Belin was a state and national representative lightweight rower from the Haberfield Rowing Club in Sydney who, in 1977, won a bronze medal at the 1977 World Rowing Championships in Amsterdam.

In late 2020, de Belin underwent surgery for testicular cancer after being diagnosed earlier that year. His grandmother was born in Papua New Guinea so he qualifies for international selection for the Papua New Guinea national rugby league team.

== Playing career ==
=== Early career ===
De Belin played part of his junior football career with St Gregory's College, Campbelltown and the Cootamundra Bulldogs in Group 9. He was then signed by St George Illawarra and competed in the 2011 National Youth Competition where he made it into the team of the year squad.

=== First grade career (up to 2018) ===
De Belin made his first grade debut for St George Illawarra on 27 June 2011 against Manly and played three first grade matches that year. In 2014, de Belin signed a year extension deal with St George Illawarra which would see him play with the club until the end of 2017. He went on to make 21 appearances for St George Illawarra in the 2014 season.

In 2015, de Belin was in the St George Illawarra side which made the finals but were eliminated by Canterbury-Bankstown in the first week. He made twenty two appearances for the season and was a regular in the lineup. 2016 saw de Belin make his representative debut when chosen to represent New South Wales Country in the annual City vs Country game. That year he again featured regularly in the Dragons' first grade line-up and made twenty-one appearances for the season.

In 2017, de Belin was again chosen to represent New South Wales Country in what would be the final City vs Country match. In May 2017, de Belin was named in an extended New South Wales side to take on Queensland in Game 1 of the 2017 State of Origin series. Also in 2017, de Belin signed another three-year extension deal to stay at St George Illawarra until 2020.

De Belin was selected to play for New South Wales in the 2018 State of Origin series. He played in all games of the series and was credited for being a key part of New South Wales' 2–1 series victory over Queensland.

=== 2018 ===
==== Sexual assault allegation ====
On 13 December 2018, de Belin was charged by police with aggravated sexual assault following an encounter with a woman in Wollongong, New South Wales. The incident reportedly happened after the woman had left a nightclub with a group of men including de Belin. The woman claimed in her statement that she was under the impression the group would head to another nightclub but instead ended up at an apartment block where de Belin and de Belin's friend stripped naked and sexually assaulted her. Both men denied the claims.

=== 2019 ===
On 28 February 2019, de Belin was stood down by the NRL under the NRL's new 'no fault stand down policy', which allows players to train but not play until the completion of investigations in which players are charged with any serious criminal offence that has a maximum jail term of 11 years or more. On 17 May 2019, de Belin lost his federal court bid to be reinstated by the NRL.

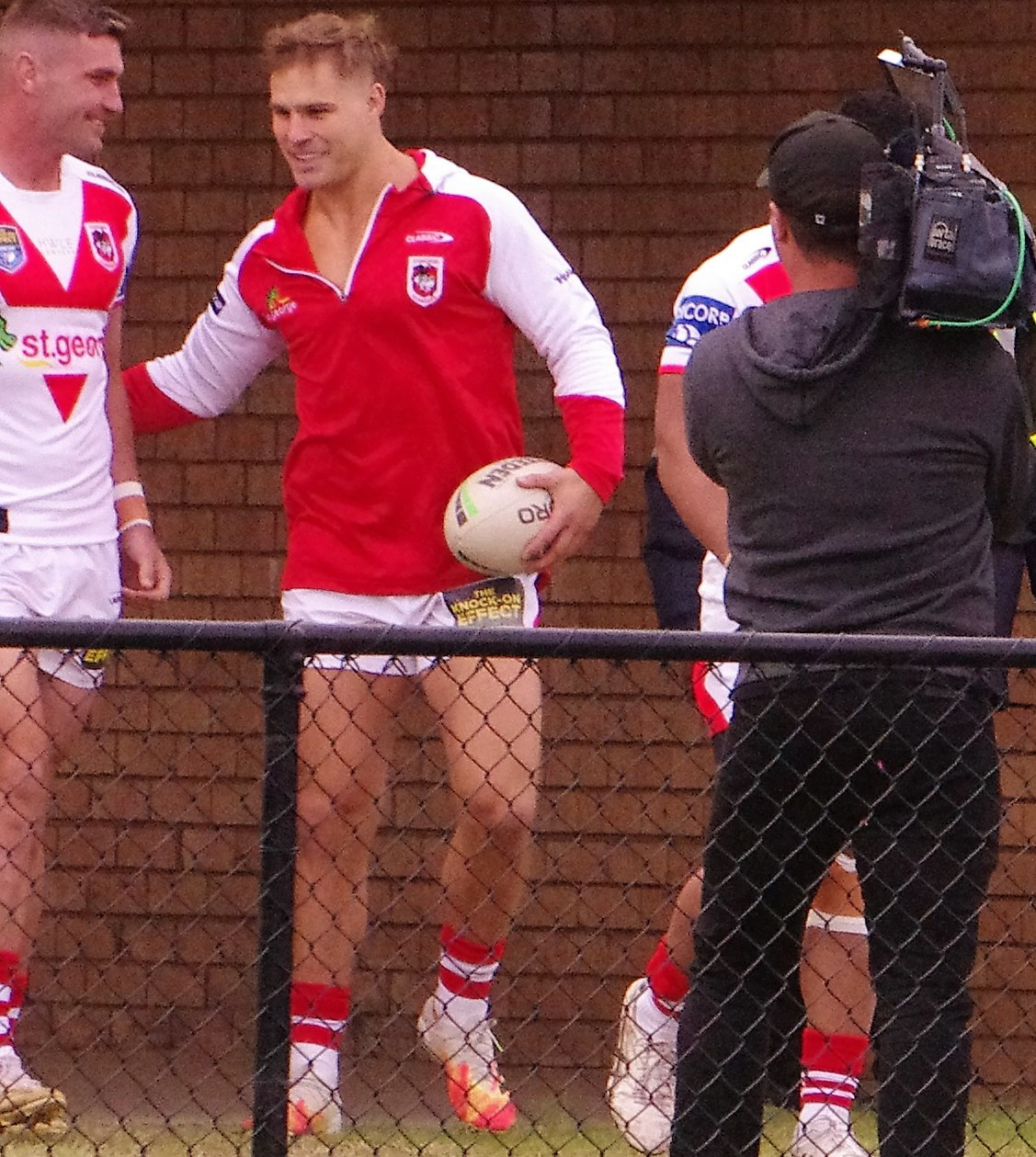
De Belin pre game in 2021

On 28 May 2019, de Belin was charged with two further counts of sexual assault. On 24 July 2019, De Belin was committed to stand trial over allegations of sexual assault, having been charged with five counts of rape. On 13 February 2020, it was announced that De Belin's trial would be delayed until 8 April 2020 after a significant witness in the case became ill and was unable to attend court. During the November 2020 trial, NSW Police Detective Senior Constable Shawn Adams, who was tasked with leading the investigation into the de Belin rape allegations, admitted to willfully lying to the court while under oath and failing to disclose inconsistencies in the alleged victim's statement. Adams was also criticised for not separating the woman who had accompanied the alleged victim to the police station, even though he knew she would later become a key witness in the trial. Adams was later arrested and charged with perjury. On 30 November 2020, De Belin's trial was delayed further after the jury failed to reach a verdict and were subsequently discharged.

=== 2020 ===
In February 2020, de Belin sued newspaper, The Daily Telegraph for defamation over a front-page story published in 2019 that referenced the allegations. In September 2021, the claim was settled after the Telegraph's parent company issued a withdrawal, stating that the story "did not intend to convey he was guilty of sexual assault and withdraws any suggestion to that effect".

=== 2021 ===
On 3 May 2021, the jury in de Belin's retrial retired to consider its verdicts. The jury had previously heard 13 days of both pre-recorded and live evidence. After lengthy deliberations, the jury was unable to reach a verdict on five of the charges, and returned a not guilty verdict on the sixth charge. He remained stood down by the NRL pending the outcome of a third trial option. On 27 May 2021, all remaining charges against de Belin were dropped.

With all remaining charges being dropped, de Belin signed a new four-year deal with St. George Illawarra. On 28 May the NRL confirmed it had registered de Belin's playing contract.

After nearly 1,000 days since his last competitive match, de Belin played for St. George Illawarra's NSW Cup side against Western Suburbs on 29 May 2021.

De Belin was named on 1 June 2021 to play his returning first grade match on 3 June 2021, which was a 52–24 victory over Brisbane at Kogarah Oval.

He played a total of 11 matches for St. George Illawarra in the 2021 NRL season. De Belin played 24 games for St. George Illawarra in the 2022 NRL season as the club finished 10th on the table and missed the finals. In round 17 of the 2023 NRL season, de Belin made his 200th first grade appearance in St. George Illawarra's 48-18 loss against the New Zealand Warriors.

=== 2023 ===
He would play a total of 16 games for the club in the 2023 NRL season as they finished 16th on the table.

=== 2024 ===
In 2024, De Belin re-signed with St. George Illawarra until the end of the 2025 season. De Belin played 24 games for St. George Illawarra in the 2024 NRL season as the club finished 11th on the table.

=== 2025 ===
On 25 June 2025, it was announced in the media that De Belin had signed with the Parramatta Eels on a two-year contract commencing in 2026. De Belin had informed the St. George club of his intention to leave after failing to secure another deal with the team. On 15 July, the Parramatta club officially announced that they had signed De Belin on the two-year contract with the second year being in their favour for the 2027 season. In round 24 of the 2025 NRL season, De Belin played his 250th first grade game against New Zealand. De Belin's final game for the Red V came in round 27 of the 2025 NRL season against Penrith where St. George lost 40-20.

On 12 October 2025 he made his debut for the PNG Prime Minister's XIII in the 28-10 defeat to Australia’s Prime Minister's XIII in Port Moresby

=== 2026 ===
In round 1 of the 2026 NRL season, De Belin made his club debut for Parramatta against Melbourne which ended in a 52-4 loss.In round 3 he was demoted to reserve grade. In round 6 he was recalled to the Parramatta side for their match against the Gold Coast which ended in a 52-10 loss. In August, it was announced that Parramatta opted against activating their club option for 2027, leaving De Belin free to explore his options with rival clubs. De Belin played 18 games for Parramatta in the 2026 NRL season as the club finished 13th on the table.

== Statistics ==
Season	Team	Pld	T	G	FG	P
2011	St. George Illawarra Dragons	3	-	-	-	0
2012	St. George Illawarra Dragons	19	-	-	-	0
2013	St. George Illawarra Dragons	20	1	-	-	4
2014	St. George Illawarra Dragons	21	1	-	-	4
2015	St. George Illawarra Dragons	22	1	-	-	4
2016	St. George Illawarra Dragons	21	1	-	-	4
2017	St. George Illawarra Dragons	23	2	-	-	8
2018	St. George Illawarra Dragons	25	3	-	-	12
2021	St. George Illawarra Dragons	11	-	-	-	0
2022	St. George Illawarra Dragons	24	5	-	-	20
2023	St. George Illawarra Dragons	16	1	-	-	4
2024	St. George Illawarra Dragons	24	3	-	-	12
2025	St. George Illawarra Dragons	23	1	-	-	4
2026	Parramatta Eels	2	-	-	-	0
2027	Parramatta Eels					
	Totals	254	19	0	0	76

== Controversy ==
On 5 July 2021, de Belin was fined $42,000 by the NRL and suspended for one game after breaching the game's COVID-19 bio-security protocols when he attended a party along with 12 other St. George Illawarra players at Paul Vaughan's home. It was also alleged that de Belin hid under one of the beds at the home to avoid being seen by NSW Police.
