= Jack Holland (rugby league) =

Australia international rugby league footballer

- Holland in 1949

Personal information
- Full name: John Frederick Holland
- Born: 19 August 1922 Penshurst, New South Wales, Australia
- Died: 23 January 1994 (aged 71) Brighton-Le-Sands, New South Wales, Australia

Playing information
- Position: Prop
Club
Years	Team	Pld	T	G	FG	P
1947–52	St. George	87	27	3	0	87
Representative
Years	Team	Pld	T	G	FG	P
1948–51	NSW City	5	1	0	0	3
1948–51	New South Wales	4	1	0	0	3
1948–50	Australia	7	0	1	0	2
- Source: As of 11 June 2019

Jack Holland (1922-1994) was an Australian professional rugby league footballer who played in the 1940s and 1950s. An Australian international and New South Wales interstate representative forward, he played his club football in Sydney's NSWRFL Premiership for the St. George club.

== Background ==
Holland was born in Sydney, New South Wales, Australia on 19 August 1922. He served in the Army during World War II.

== Career ==
Holland commenced his first-grade NSWRFL Premiership playing career with St. George in 1947, he was selected to represent New South Wales in 1948.

In 1948 Holland was also first selected for the Australian national team, becoming Kangaroo No. 252. He went on the 1948–49 Kangaroo tour of Great Britain and France. He played in the first Test against Great Britain and also the Test against Wales.

At the end of the 1949 NSWRFL season, Holland played for St. George at prop forward in their grand final victory against South Sydney. He was then selected to go on the 1949 Kangaroo tour of New Zealand, playing in both Test matches against the Kiwis.

During the 1950 Great Britain Lions tour Holland was selected to play for New South Wales twice, and Australia in all three Ashes Tests, against the visitors.

During the 1951 French rugby league tour of Australia and New Zealand, Holland was selected to play for the Sydney representative rugby league team that drew with the Les Chanticleers. After playing six seasons at St. George, the 1952 NSWRFL season was the last to feature Holland.

In 1953 Holland played as both a front rower and lock for country NSW club, Peak Hill.

Holland died in 1994, aged 71.
