= Arthur Moynihan =

Australian rugby league footballer

Personal information
- Full name: Arthur Patrick Moynihan
- Born: 25 January 1924 Sydney, New South Wales, Australia
- Died: 18 February 2001 (aged 77) Greenwich, New South Wales, Australia

Playing information
- Position: Five-eighth
Club
Years	Team	Pld	T	G	FG	P
1949	South Sydney	4	0	0	0	0
- Source: As of 18 June 2019

Arthur Patrick Moynihan (1924–2001) was an Australian rugby league footballer who played in the 1940s. He later became a Catholic priest.

== Background ==
Moynihan was born in Sydney on 25 January 1924.

== Playing career ==
Moynihan was a reserve grade player for South Sydney that was elevated to first grade for four games during the 1949 NSWRFL season. He is remembered as playing in the 1949 Grand Final as the Five-Eighth.

== Later life ==
Moynihan was ordained a priest for the Society of Mary.

== Death ==
Moynihan died at Greenwich, New South Wales on 18 February 2001.
