= Len Allmond =

Australian rugby league footballer

Personal information
- Full name: Leonard Norman Allmond
- Born: 12 September 1925 Randwick, New South Wales, Australia
- Died: 25 September 2011 (aged 86) Daceyville, New South Wales, Australia

Playing information
- Position: Wing
Club
Years	Team	Pld	T	G	FG	P
1947–49	South Sydney	36	30	0	0	90
- Source: Whittaker/Hudson

Leonard Norman Allmond (12 September 1925 – 25 September 2011) was an Australian rugby league footballer who played in the 1940s.

Len Allmond was a wing for the South Sydney Rabbitohs for three seasons between 1947 and 1949. He played in the Souths team that lost the 1949 Grand Final to St George Dragons 19–12. Len Allmond was also a Flight Sergeant for the RAAF during World War II.

Len Allmond died on 25 September 2011, aged 86 at Daceyville, New South Wales.
