= Kevin Schubert =

Australia international rugby league player (1927-2007)

- Schubert in the 1951 Manly side

Personal information
- Full name: Kevin Bernard Schubert
- Born: 17 September 1927 Wollongong, New South Wales, Australia
- Died: 23 January 2007 (aged 79) Mona Vale, New South Wales, Australia

Playing information
- Position: Hooker
Club
Years	Team	Pld	T	G	FG	P
1947–49	Wollongong
1950–56	Manly-Warringah	87	2	0	0	6
	Total	87	2	0	0	6
Representative
Years	Team	Pld	T	G	FG	P
1952–54	NSW City	2	0	0	0	0
1948	NSW Country	1	0	0	0	0
1948–54	New South Wales	12	0	0	0	0
1947–53	Australia	19	0	0	0	0

Kevin Schubert (1927-2007) was an Australian professional rugby league footballer who played in the 1940s and 1950s. An international and interstate representative hooker, he played his club football in the Illawarra Rugby League before moving to Sydney's NSWRL Premiership to play for Manly-Warringah, which he also captained.

== Playing career ==
Of German descent, Schubert made his first-grade debut for Wollongong in 1947. While playing there he represented Southern Districts, Country NSW, New South Wales and also gained selection for the 1948–49 Kangaroo tour of Great Britain and France. He is listed on the Australian Players Register as Kangaroo No. 246. Schubert played in every test match of the tour. Schubert also represented New South Wales in life-saving.

After strong competition from other clubs, his friendship formed with Manly-Warringah front rower Roy Bull while the pair were playing for Australia against New Zealand on the 1949 Kangaroo tour of New Zealand saw the Sea Eagles secure the 22-year-old Test hooker's services from the 1950 NSWRFL season. During the 1950 Great Britain Lions tour Schubert was selected to play for New South Wales and Australia. He was selected to represent Sydney against France during their 1951 tour of Australasia in a match that ended in a 19-all draw. He captained Manly-Warringah in their maiden grand final appearance at the end of the 1951 NSWRFL season under coach Wally O'Connell. He was selected to go on the 1952–53 Kangaroo tour of Great Britain and France, playing in two test matches. He retired in 1954 but made a comeback for one more season in 1956.

== Death ==
In early January 2007 Schubert was hospitalized after a fall which broke his hip. On 22 January 2007 Schubert died at Mona Vale Hospital from pneumonia which he contracted whilst in for his hip.

== Accolades ==
Schubert was named in the Illawarra Team of the Century. Later that year he was selected by a panel of experts at hooker in an Australian 'Team of the 50s'.
