= Jim Duckworth (rugby league) =

Australian RL coach and former rugby league footballer

Personal information
- Full name: James Joseph Duckworth
- Born: 18 April 1908; Balmain, New South Wales, Australia
- Died: 2 July 1967 (aged 59); Rozelle, New South Wales, Australia

Playing information
- Position: Centre, Five-eighth
Club
Years	Team	Pld	T	G	FG	P
1928–38	Balmain	44	14	33	0	108

Coaching information
Club
Years	Team	Gms	W	D	L	W%
1948–50	St. George	64	38	5	21	59
1951	Balmain	18	6	0	12	33
	Total	82	44	5	33	54

James Joseph Duckworth (1908–1967) was an Australian rugby league footballer, a premiership winning coach and administrator.

== Playing career ==
Duckworth was born in 1908 at Balmain, New South Wales, who came through the junior ranks to play first grade for the Balmain club. He played nine seasons with Balmain between 1928 and 1933 and between 1936 and 1938, although he spent two years at Cessnock and Port Macquarie during 1934–35.

Balmain Premiers 1939 - Duckworth back row 3rd from right

== Coaching and administrative career ==
He returned to coach Port Macquarie and Kempsey teams in the war years before coming to St. George as first grade coach in 1948. Duckworth coached the Saints between 1948 and 1950, and won the 1949 Grand Final with them. He fell out with the club at the end of 1950 and returned to his old club, Balmain, to coach them for the 1951 season without success.

Duckworth later moved into rugby league administration, firstly as a state and then as an Australian selector. He went on to become a director and vice-president of the NSWRFL, under Bill Buckley until he died suddenly in 1967.

== Death ==
He died suddenly on 2 July 1967, at his Rozelle, New South Wales home.
