= Carl Langton =

Australian rugby league footballer

Personal information
- Full name: Carl John Langton
- Born: 29 June 1920 Sydney, New South Wales, Australia
- Died: 10 December 2003 (aged 83) Cambridge Park, New South Wales, Australia

Playing information
- Position: Second-row
Club
Years	Team	Pld	T	G	FG	P
1942–47	North Sydney	24	3	0	0	9
1949–50	St George Dragons	19	3	0	0	9
	Total	43	6	0	0	18

Carl John Langton (1920–2003) was an Australian rugby league footballer who played in the 1940s and 1950s. He played in the New South Wales premiership competition for two different Sydney clubs and was later a top-grade referee.

== Playing career ==
Langton played rugby league for North Sydney for four seasons: 1942, 1944, 1946–1947. He then joined the St George Dragons for two seasons between 1949 and 1950, winning the Sydney Premiership with St George in 1949. Langton played in the second row as the Dragons defeated the South Sydney Rabbitohs 19–12.

== Retirement and Refereeing ==
He retired from Sydney football at the end of the 1950 NSWRFL season. He later became a first grade referee.

== Later life and death ==
Carl Langton later moved to Canberra where he eventually became a fan of the Canberra Raiders, a new team introduced to the Sydney Premiership in 1982. Langton was interviewed by ABC TV at the Queanbeyan Leagues Club during half time of the 1987 Grand Final in which the raiders played their first ever Grand Final, though they would ultimately lose 8–18 to Manly-Warringah.

Langton died on 10 December 2003 aged 83.
