= Ron Griffiths (rugby league) =

Australian rugby league footballer

Personal information
- Full name: Ronald Ean Griffiths
- Born: 25 August 1924 Mackay, Queensland, Australia
- Died: 15 January 1970 (aged 45)

Playing information
- Position: Hooker
Representative
Years	Team	Pld	T	G	FG	P
1949–52	Queensland	14	0	0	0	0
1949	Australia

Ronald Ean Griffiths (25 August 1924 – 15 January 1970) was an Australian rugby league footballer.

Griffith, a hooker, learned his rugby league in Mackay and after a brief period in Rockhampton moved to Ipswich in 1947 to work as a fitter for Ipswich Railway. He earned representative honours for Ipswich in the Bulimba Cup, during a spell with local side CYMS, and made his debut for Queensland in 1949.

While in Ipswich, Griffith gained a national team call up for their 1949 tour of New Zealand. He served as an understudy to Kevin Schubert and featured in three non international fixtures.

Griffiths was captain–coach of Lockyer in 1952 and the following year joined Cairns club Ivanhoe as coach.
