= Noel Mulligan =

Australia international rugby league footballer

Personal information
- Full name: Noel Gregory Mulligan
- Born: 12 April 1926 Port Kembla, New South Wales, Australia
- Died: 11 March 2000 (aged 73) Port Kembla, New South Wales, Australia

Playing information
- Position: Lock
Club
Years	Team	Pld	T	G	FG	P
	Port Kembla
1945–46	Newtown	22	5	0	0	15
1947	Bowral
1948	Newtown	9	3	0	0	9
1949	Bowral
1950–51	St. George	32	4	0	0	12
	Total	63	12	0	0	36
Representative
Years	Team	Pld	T	G	FG	P
1946–51	New South Wales	10	4	0	0	12
1946–51	Australia	10	2	0	0	6
1947–49	Country NSW	2	0	0	0	0
1948–51	City NSW	3	1	0	0	3

Noel Mulligan (12 April 1926 – 11 March 2000), also known by the nickname of "The Count", was an Australian professional rugby league footballer who played in the 1940s and 1950s. An Australian international and New South Wales interstate representative forward, he played club football in Sydney's NSWRFL premiership for Newtown and St. George, as well as elsewhere in New South Wales.

== Biography ==
Mulligan started his playing career in the 1940s with the Illawarra Rugby League's Port Kembla club. In 1945 he joined the previous season's NSWRFL grand finalists, Newtown. Mulligan was first selected to represent New South Wales during the 1946 Great Britain Lions tour. He was then selected to represent Australia for the first time, also against the British in the first test match, becoming Kangaroo No. 227. He also played in the third Test, losing The Ashes to the Lions. Mulligan returned to Country New South Wales in 1947, captain-coaching Bowral's club to a Group 6 Rugby League first-grade premiership in addition to continuing representative duties with New South Wales and Country NSW. In 1948 Mulligan returned to Newtown. He was selected to go on the 1948–49 Kangaroo tour of Great Britain and France, playing in all five test matches against Great Britain and France. Mulligan again represented New South Wales and was selected to go on the 1949 Kangaroo tour of New Zealand, missing his club Bowral's grand final loss.

Mulligan signed to play in Sydney once again with St. George from 1950, continuing to represent New South Wales during the 1950 Great Britain Lions tour, as well as Sydney that season. He was selected to represent Sydney against France during their 1951 tour of Australasia in a match that ended in a 19-all draw. He also played his last test match against France during their tour. Mulligan successfully coached the Captains Flat Redmen to successive premierships in the Group 8 competition in 1952 and 1953 before returning to the Illawarra. During the 1954 Great Britain Lions tour he was selected to play for Southern NSW in the forwards.

Mulligan died in 2000, 32 days before his 74th birthday.

== Legacy ==
In 2001, the Port Kembla Blacks' home ground at Darcy Wentworth Park in the Wollongong suburb of Warrawong was named Noel Mulligan Oval. In 2008, the Newtown Jets club's centenary year, they named their 'Team of the Century' with Mulligan at lock forward. In addition the Illawarra Rugby League named him at lock in their team of the century.
