= 1949 Eastern Suburbs season =

| ← 1948 | 1950 → |

Eastern Suburbs (now known as the Sydney Roosters) competed in their 42nd New South Wales Rugby League season in 1949.

== Season summary ==
- Eastern Suburbs won the wooden spoon.
- Representatives – Col Donohoe (Aus), Vic Bulgin (Aus)

== Players ==
Ray Stehr (Coach); Kevin Abrahamsen, Jack Arnold, Milton Atkinson, Reg Beath, Frank Burke, Vic Bulgin, Jack Coll, Col Donohoe, Ernie Hawkins, Gordon Hassett, Dick Healy, Sid Hobson, Brian Holmes, Jim Hunt, Ken Hunter, Ken McCaffery, Billy Morris, John Murphy, J 'Mick' Phelan, Stan Robinson, John Sellgren, Len Solomon, Ralph Stewart, Ian Verrender

== NSWRFL ladder ==
| | Team | Pld | W | D | L | PF | PA | PD | Pts |
|---|---|---|---|---|---|---|---|---|---|
| 1 | South Sydney | 18 | 13 | 1 | 4 | 360 | 210 | +150 | 27 |
| 2 | Western Suburbs | 18 | 12 | 0 | 6 | 365 | 280 | +85 | 24 |
| 3 | St. George | 18 | 11 | 1 | 6 | 345 | 231 | +114 | 23 |
| 4 | Balmain | 18 | 10 | 2 | 6 | 265 | 206 | +59 | 22 |
| 5 | Parramatta | 18 | 8 | 4 | 6 | 311 | 269 | +42 | 20 |
| 6 | Newtown | 18 | 9 | 1 | 8 | 358 | 332 | +26 | 19 |
| 7 | Canterbury-Bankstown | 18 | 6 | 2 | 10 | 236 | 337 | -101 | 14 |
| 8 | Manly-Warringah | 18 | 6 | 1 | 11 | 171 | 293 | -122 | 13 |
| 9 | North Sydney | 18 | 5 | 1 | 12 | 253 | 369 | -116 | 11 |
| 10 | Eastern Suburbs | 18 | 3 | 1 | 14 | 214 | 351 | -137 | 7 |
