= Jack Melville =

Australian rugby league player

Personal information
- Full name: Allan John Melville
- Born: 11 February 1921; Sydney, New South Wales, Australia
- Died: 15 November 1977 (aged 56); Sydney, New South Wales, Australia

Playing information
- Position: Prop
Club
Years	Team	Pld	T	G	FG	P
1947–49	South Sydney	31	7	0	0	21

Allan John Melville (1921-1977) was an Australian rugby league footballer who played in the 1940s. He played for South Sydney in the New South Wales Rugby League (NSWRL) competition.

== Playing career ==
Melville made his first-grade debut for Souths in 1947.

In 1949, Melville made 15 appearances as Souths claimed the minor premiership and reached the grand final against St George. Melville played in the match as Souths lost the grand final 19–12 with St George claiming their second premiership. This in turn would be Melville's last game for the club.
