= Ian Johnston (rugby league) =

Australian rugby league player and coach

Personal information
- Full name: Ian Johnston
- Born: 1 March 1927 Newcastle, New South Wales, Australia
- Died: 1 February 2013 (aged 85)

Playing information
- Position: Centre
Club
| Years | Team | Pld | T | G | FG | P |
|---|---|---|---|---|---|---|
| 1948–54 | Parramatta | 90 | 44 | 68 | 0 | 268 |
| 1956–57 | Western Suburbs | 30 | 15 | 0 | 0 | 45 |
| | Total | 120 | 59 | 68 | 0 | 313 |
Representative
| Years | Team | Pld | T | G | FG | P |
| 1949 | Australia | 1 | 0 | 3 | 0 | 9 |
| 1949 | New South Wales | 3 | 2 | 0 | 0 | 6 |

Coaching information
Club
| Years | Team | Gms | W | D | L | W% |
| 1968–69 | Parramatta | 44 | 23 | 1 | 20 | 52 |

Ian Johnston (1927−2013) was an Australian professional rugby league footballer who played in the 1940s and 1950s, and coached in the 1960s. He played for Parramatta Eels and Western Suburbs Magpies as a centre. Johnston was the first ever Parramatta player to represent Australia.

== Playing career ==
Johnston was born and raised in Newcastle, New South Wales and played his junior rugby league before joining the newly admitted Parramatta side in 1948. In 1949, Johnston became the first Parramatta player to represent Australia when he was selected to tour New Zealand and featured in one match. Johnston was also selected to play for New South Wales in the same year and played in three matches scoring two tries. Johnston later became the first Parramatta player to reach 100 points in the NSWRL competition but his time at Parramatta was not very successful and was part of the sides that claimed the 1952 and 1954 wooden spoons. He left the club briefly in 1953 after a dispute with club management and went as player coach for one season in Young. This was a successful season and Young won the Clayton Cup. After leaving Parramatta, Johnston moved to Maitland and played a season in the local Newcastle competition before returning to Sydney and signed with Western Suburbs. Johnston spent two seasons at Wests before retiring as a player.

== Coaching career ==
Johnston coached the Parramatta reserve grade side from 1961 to 1967 and then eventually became first grade coach at the club and spent two seasons in the role with the club hovering around lower to mid table under his tenure.

== Later life ==
Johnston later served the club in a number of administrative roles and was a member of the board of directors at Parramatta. Johnston was inducted into the Parramatta hall of fame in 2009 and along with Ron Hilditch is the only Parramatta player to have played first grade for the club, coached the first grade team and served as a director. He died on 1 February 2013 after a long illness.
