= Alan Thompson (rugby league, born 1922) =

Australian rugby league player

Personal information
- Born: 29 January 1922; Herberton, QLD, Australia
- Died: 28 November 2008 (aged 86)

Playing information
- Position: Prop / Second-row
Representative
Years	Team	Pld	T	G	FG	P
1949–51	Queensland	14	5	0	0	15
1950–51	Australia	3	0	0	0	0

Alan Thompson (29 January 1922 – 28 November 2008) was an Australian rugby league player.

== Rugby league career ==
Born in Herberton in Far North Queensland, Thompson began his career with Brisbane club Southern Suburbs in 1945 and was initially a fullback, before developing into a prop/second-rower.

Thompson performed well for Queensland during his first interstate series against New South Wales in 1949 and toured New Zealand that year with the national squad, but wasn't required for the Test matches. He played two home Tests against Great Britain in 1950 and the following year appeared against France at the Gabba.
