= Billy Thompson (rugby league) =

Australian rugby league player

Personal information
- Full name: William Thompson
- Born: 23 September 1923
- Died: 25 April 1992 (aged 68)

Playing information
- Position: Halfback / Five-eighth
Club
Years	Team	Pld	T	G	FG	P
1942–46	South Sydney	32	1	0	0	3
Representative
Years	Team	Pld	T	G	FG	P
1947–50	Queensland	10	5	0	0	15
1948	Australia	1	0	0	0	0

William Thompson (23 September 1923 – 25 April 1992) was an Australian rugby league player.

A local junior from the Cleveland Street club, Thompson was a five-eighth and halfback with South Sydney from 1942 to 1946. He was a New South Wales City representative player in 1944 and appeared for New South Wales in a match against Services. After leaving South Sydney, Thompson had a season as captain-coach of Moree.

Thompson relocated to Queensland in 1947 to play for Toowoomba Valleys and gained Queensland selection during his first season. One of three halfbacks on the 1948–49 tour of Great Britain, Thompson made his Test debut for Australia in the 2nd Test against Great Britain in Swinton, partnering captain Wally O'Connell in the halves. He also toured New Zealand the following year, but didn't add to his solitary Test appearance.
