= Roy Bull =

Australian RL coach and former Australia international rugby league footballer

- Bull in the 1951 Manly side

Personal information
- Full name: Edwin Royden Bull
- Born: 12 June 1929 Orange, New South Wales, Australia
- Died: 29 June 2004 (aged 75) Australia

Playing information
- Position: Prop
Club
| Years | Team | Pld | T | G | FG | P |
|---|---|---|---|---|---|---|
| 1947–59 | Manly-Warringah | 177 | 25 | 0 | 0 | 75 |
Representative
| Years | Team | Pld | T | G | FG | P |
| 1949–56 | New South Wales | 26 | 1 | 0 | 0 | 3 |
| 1949–57 | Australia | 23 | 1 | 0 | 0 | 3 |
| 1950–56 | NSW City | 6 | 1 | 0 | 0 | 3 |

Coaching information
Club
| Years | Team | Gms | W | D | L | W% |
| 1953 | Manly-Warringah | 18 | 6 | 0 | 12 | 33 |

Roy Bull (12 June 1929 – 29 June 2004) was an Australian rugby league footballer who played in the 1940s and 1950s and spent his whole career – as player, coach & administrator – with the Manly-Warringah club in Sydney. In addition to playing in three New South Wales Rugby Football League premiership grand finals, he was a representative for the New South Wales rugby league team and the Australian national side. He has since been named amongst the nation's finest footballers of the 20th century.

== Club career & playing style ==
Bull attended Manly Boys High together and played his junior football with the Freshwater club. He made his first grade debut as a 17-year-old in Manly's inaugural top-grade season in 1947 after having played in Manly's winning 1946 President's Cup team. The club's junior success played some part in their selection for promotion to the first grade in 1947 with the NSWRFL promising the club first grade status should they win the 3rd grade (President's Cup) competition.

Bull was a key member in the great Manly sides of the 1950s and played in all three unsuccessful Grand Final attempts during that decade – 1951, 1957 and 1959.

The Gregory's reference written only a few years after his playing career had ended noted him as an expert scrummager and outstanding in tight forward play. He was a powerful, remorseless, non-stop player, great in the wet or when slushy fields covered up his lack of pace.

He played 182 games for Manly up until his retirement in 1959 a record at that time, scoring 25 tries. He was captain-coach in 1953 and was made a life member of the club in 1962.

== Representative career ==
Roy Bull was Manly's first international representative and played 23 tests and close to 100 total representative games. He made two Australian Kangaroo tours. In 1952-53 he played in four Tests and thirteen minor tour matches and 1956-57 he appeared in all six Tests and fifteen tour matches. He made three tours of New Zealand, appearing in all three Tests of 1953 and 1956. He was in the 1954 World Cup squad and made three appearances.

Bull made his representative debut for New South Wales in the interstate series against Queensland in Game 3 of the 4-game series on 23 July 1949. He was then selected to tour New Zealand with the Australian team, making his test debut in Australia's 13–10 win over New Zealand at Carlaw Park on 8 October 1949.

== Administrator ==
After the 1977 NSWRFL season Bull was elected the Manly-Warringah club's president, succeeding Bill Cameron who had held the position for the previous 19 years. In that role from 1978 to 1987, he continued his close association with the Sea Eagles.

== Accolades ==
He was named as New South Wales Player of the Year in 1955.

In 2006 Bull was named in Manly-Warringah's greatest team on the club's 60th anniversary at prop with teammate Ken Arthurson as coach. Also that year he was selected by a panel of experts at prop in an Australian 'Team of the 50s'.

In February 2008, Bull was named in a list of Australia's 100 Greatest Players (1908–2007) which was commissioned by the NRL and ARL to celebrate the code's centenary year in Australia. Also that year Bull was named in New South Wales' rugby league team of the century.

The Manly Warringah Sea Eagles Best & Fairest award has been renamed the "Roy Bull Best & Fairest" award in honour of the club's first home grown international player.

== Sources ==
- Andrews, Malcolm (2006) The ABC of Rugby League Austn Broadcasting Corpn, Sydney
- Whiticker, Alan & Hudson, Glen (2005) The Encyclopedia of Australian Rugby League Players: Manly-Warringah Sea Eagles Gary Allen Pty Ltd
- Pollard, Jack (ed) Gregory's Guide to Rugby League (1965), Grenville Publishing Sydney
