= Charlie Banks (rugby league) =

Scottish rugby league footballer (1923–2016)

Personal information
- Full name: Charles Joseph Banks
- Born: 31 August 1923 Edinburgh, Scotland
- Died: 2016 (aged 92–93)

Playing information
- Position: Second-row
Club
Years	Team	Pld	T	G	FG	P
1948–50	St. George	25	8	0	0	24
1951–52	Eastern Suburbs	26	10	0	0	30
	Total	51	18	0	0	54
Representative
Years	Team	Pld	T	G	FG	P
1951	New South Wales	3	0	0	0	0

Charles Joseph Banks (born 31 August 1923 - 2016) was a Scottish-born Australian rugby league footballer who played in the 1940s and 1950s. A state representative second-rower, he won the 1949 premiership with the St George Dragons and finished his career at the Eastern Suburbs club.

== Career ==
Banks played for the St George (1948–50) and Eastern Suburbs (1951–52) clubs. A forward, Banks was a member of St. George Dragons premiership winning side in 1949.

In 1949, Charlie Banks married Shirley Smith, the daughter of St. George committeeman and Chairman of selectors Reg Smith.

In 1951, Banks represented New South Wales twice in the regular interstate clash against Queensland and also in a match against Les Chanticleers during the 1951 French rugby league tour of Australia and New Zealand.
