= Fred de Belin =

Australia international rugby league footballer

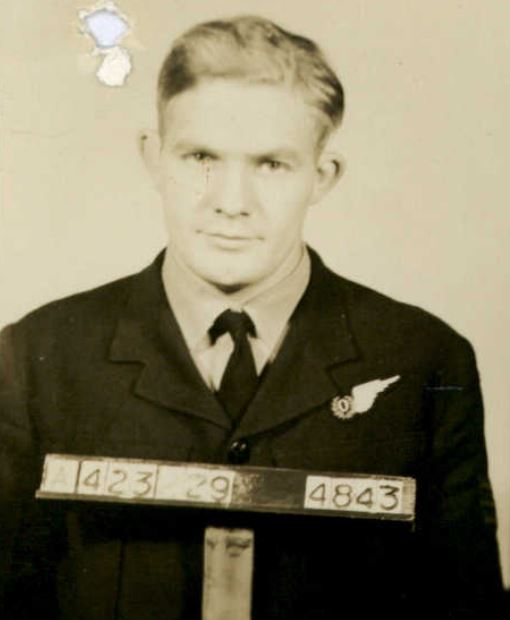

Personal information
- Full name: Fred Leslie de Belin
- Born: 15 October 1920 Sydney, New South Wales, Australia
- Died: 11 February 2006 (aged 85) Cootamundra, New South Wales, Australia

Playing information
- Position: Forward
Club
Years	Team	Pld	T	G	FG	P
1942–50	Balmain	75	13	1	0	41
1951	Cootamundra
	Total	75	13	1	0	41
Representative
Years	Team	Pld	T	G	FG	P
1948–50	City NSW	3	1	0	0	12
1948–50	New South Wales	10	4	0	0	3
1948–50	Australia	8	2	0	0	6
- Relatives: Alan de Belin (son); Jack de Belin (grandson)
- Military career
- Allegiance: Australia
- Branch: Royal Australian Air Force
- Service years: 1939-1945
- Rank: Flying officer
- Unit: RAF Bomber Command
- Conflicts: World War II

Fred de Belin (15 October 1920 – 11 February 2006) was an Australian professional rugby league footballer who played in the 1940s and an RAAF Flying Officer who saw active service over Germany during WWII. An Australian international and New South Wales interstate representative forward, he played club football in Sydney for Balmain, winning the 1946 NSWRFL Premiership with them and later being appointed their captain.

== Background ==
De Belin's father Ernest Hector Fred de Belin (1896–1971) lived in Glebe, Sydney when he enlisted in 1916 then three months shy of his twentieth birthday, as reserve for the 1st Battalion AIF. He served on the Western Front as a machine gunner and saw action at Bullecourt and Ypres. He was wounded three times but returned to the front line.

Ernest de Belin returned to Australia in July 1919 well after hostilities ended. Fred de Belin was born in Sydney on 15 October 1920 and, with his brothers Bill and Jack, and sister Dorothy Lorraine, was raised in Balmain, living on Rowntree St. He was educated at Dulwich Hill Intermediate High.

== Pre-war playing career ==
Fred de Belin started playing junior rugby league for the Balmain Police boys club, reaching first grade with the Balmain DRLFC of the NSWRFL premiership in the 1942 season. Before the war he won the New South Wales amateur wrestling championship.

== War service ==
De Belin joined the Royal Australian Air Force as part of the Empire Air Training Scheme. He spent some months in the summer and autumn of 1942–43 training on the airfields of Temora and Cootamundra. At Temora he was to be a pilot but transferred to the Air Observers School at Cootamundra to train as a navigator. He received further training in Canada – changing course to the specialized role of ‘bomb aimer‘. He was then transferred to England and into action. He flew the maximum number of 30 bombing missions over Germany, in a Lancaster named "H of Harry", rising to the rank of Flying Officer. His sorties targeted enemy munitions factories and other sites of military importance.

During his service period he secured the combined Australian services light heavyweight boxing title. He also won representative selection in the British Empire force's rugby union side and played at the war's end played in England, Wales and France.

== Post war playing career ==
De Belin resumed his playing career with Balmain in 1946. That season he played in the Tigers' victory over St. George in the final. The following year Balmain again won the premiership but de Belin did not play in the final.

In 1948 de Belin made his début for New South Wales and then won his first Australian jersey, becoming Kangaroo No. 238 in the second Test against New Zealand, helping Australia to a narrow victory that levelled the series. In the 1948 post season, De Belin was selected as a member of the first Kangaroo side to tour Great Britain and France after World War II. After breaking his leg in the first match of the tour, he recovered to make three Test appearances. He then won selection for the 1949 tour of New Zealand. The eighth and last of de Belin's Test appearances came against Great Britain in 1950, when Australia reclaimed The Ashes on home soil for the first time in thirty years.

The 1950 NSWRFL season would be de Belin's last with Balmain. During the 1951 premiership's pre-season, after playing trial matches for Balmain, de Belin newly married to wife Joan, announced that he was taking up a two-year contract worth £450 as captain-coach with the Cootamundra club in the Maher Cup competition.

Injury and poor form in Cootamundra led to de Belin's drop to reserve grade in that first year in the country. He and Joan stayed in town, Fred coached the reserve grade side and the Bethungra village team, became manager of the Cootamundra Baths, led a team of basketballers to the finals and became the town's table tennis champion. In 1952 he went back to Sydney for a successful leg operation. In 1953 he returned to the Cootamundra firsts as a forward and was a member of their Maher Cup premiership side of 1954.

== Post-playing ==
After retiring from the playing field de Belin stayed in Cootamundra raising his family, doing some refereeing and being a selector for the Group 9 country competition.

Fred's son Alan de Belin was a state and national representative lightweight rower from the Haberfield Rowing Club in Sydney. In 1977 in the Australian lightweight eight he won a bronze medal at the 1977 World Rowing Championships in Amsterdam.

De Belin died peacefully at his Queen Street, Cootamundra home aged 85 in 2006.

Following his death, de Belin was awarded life membership of the Balmain District Football Club. He was also inducted into the Balmain Tigers' Hall of Fame.

In 2011 de Belin's grandson Jack started his Australian professional rugby league career with the St George Illawarra Dragons under-20s team. By 2018 Jack had played 150 National Rugby League first grade games and that year made state selection for New South Wales in the State of Origin series.
