= Les Cowie =

Australia international rugby league footballer

Personal information
- Full name: Leslie Gordon Cowie
- Born: 17 May 1925; Rockhampton, Queensland, Australia
- Died: 20 May 1995 (aged 70); Pagewood, New South Wales, Australia

Playing information
- Position: Lock
Club
| Years | Team | Pld | T | G | FG | P |
|---|---|---|---|---|---|---|
| 1947–57 | South Sydney | 178 | 66 | 0 | 0 | 198 |
Representative
| Years | Team | Pld | T | G | FG | P |
| 1948–54 | New South Wales | 10 | 1 | 0 | 0 | 3 |
| 1948–53 | Australia | 6 | 1 | 0 | 0 | 3 |

Leslie Gordon Cowie OAM (17 May 1925 – 20 May 1995) was an Australian rugby league footballer, a fine lock for the champion South Sydney Rabbitohs teams of the 1950s and an Australia national representative. In 1994 he received a Medal of the Order of Australia for service to Rugby League football.

== Club career ==
Nicknamed "Chicka", Cowie debuted with Souths in 1947. Cowie's career with South Sydney Rabbitohs stretched from 1947 to 1957, during which he played in five premiership winning teams. In all he played 178 first grade games for Souths.

In 2004 he was named by the Souths in their South Sydney Dream Team, consisting of 17 players and a coach representing the club from 1908 through to 2004.

== Representative career ==
Cowie made six Test appearances for the Australian national representative side.

He toured with the Kangaroos to Great Britain in 1948–49, playing 20 tour matches and scoring 10 tries. He also toured New Zealand with the Kangaroos in 1949 playing in two tests against the Kiwis, six other tour matches and scoring five tries.

Cowie also played 10 games for NSW. He was selected to represent Sydney against France during their 1951 tour of Australasia in a match that ended in a 19-all draw.

== Sources ==
- Andrews, Malcolm. The ABC of Rugby League. Australia: ABC Books, 2006.
