= 1948 South Sydney season =

South Sydney Rabbitohs season

- NSWRFL Rank: 7th
- Play-off result: Missed finals
- 1948 record: Wins: 7; draws: 1; losses: 10
- Points scored: For: 265; against: 302

Team information
- Coach: Dave Watson
- Captain: Rupert Rayner
- Stadium: Redfern Oval

Top scorers
- Tries: Len Allmond (17)
- Goals: Bernard Purcell (27)
- Points: John Graves (82)
| ← 1947 | List of seasons | 1949 → |

The 1948 South Sydney was the 41st in the club's history. The club competed in the New South Wales Rugby Football League Premiership (NSWRFL), finishing the season 7th, missing the finals.

== Ladder ==
| | Team | Pld | W | D | L | PF | PA | PD | Pts |
|---|---|---|---|---|---|---|---|---|---|
| 1 | Western Suburbs (P) | 18 | 16 | 0 | 2 | 322 | 189 | +133 | 32 |
| 2 | Newtown | 18 | 13 | 0 | 5 | 386 | 248 | +138 | 26 |
| 3 | Balmain | 18 | 12 | 2 | 4 | 287 | 222 | +65 | 26 |
| 4 | St. George | 18 | 10 | 1 | 7 | 332 | 262 | +70 | 21 |
| 5 | Canterbury-Bankstown | 18 | 7 | 2 | 9 | 282 | 276 | +6 | 16 |
| 6 | Eastern Suburbs | 18 | 7 | 2 | 9 | 225 | 248 | -23 | 16 |
| 7 | South Sydney | 18 | 7 | 1 | 10 | 265 | 302 | -37 | 15 |
| 8 | Parramatta | 18 | 5 | 1 | 12 | 237 | 346 | -109 | 11 |
| 9 | Manly-Warringah | 18 | 4 | 1 | 13 | 221 | 334 | -113 | 9 |
| 10 | North Sydney | 18 | 3 | 2 | 13 | 191 | 321 | -130 | 8 |

== Fixtures ==
| Round | Opponent | Result | Score | Date | Venue | Ref |
|---|---|---|---|---|---|---|
| 1 | Parramatta | Win | 15 – 12 | Saturday 10 April | Cumberland Oval | |
| 2 | Eastern Suburbs | Draw | 19 – 19 | Saturday 17 April | Redfern Park | |
| 3 | Western Suburbs | Loss | 8 – 10 | Saturday 24 April | Sydney Cricket Ground | |
| 4 | Balmain | Loss | 10 – 13 | Monday 26 April | Leichhardt Oval | |
| 5 | Newtown | Loss | 8 – 16 | Saturday 1 May | Erskineville Oval | |
| 6 | Manly-Warringah | Win | 17 – 9 | Saturday 5 June | Redfern Park | |
| 7 | North Sydney | Win | 12 – 7 | Saturday 12 June | North Sydney Oval | |
| 8 | Canterbury-Bankstown | Loss | 8 – 17 | Monday 14 June | Sydney Cricket Ground | |
| 9 | St. George | Loss | 2 – 31 | Saturday 19 June | Redfern Park | |
| 10 | Parramatta | Win | 38 – 5 | Saturday 26 June | Redfern Park | |
| 11 | Eastern Suburbs | Win | 16 – 8 | Saturday 3 July | Sports Ground | |
| 12 | Western Suburbs | Loss | 17 – 18 | Saturday 10 July | Sydney Cricket Ground | |
| 13 | Balmain | Loss | 8 – 14 | Saturday 17 July | Redfern Park | |
| 14 | Newtown | Loss | 13 – 20 | Saturday 24 July | Redfern Oval | |
| 15 | Manly-Warringah | Loss | 13 – 39 | Saturday 31 July | Brookvale Oval | |
| 16 | North Sydney | Win | 24 – 17 | Saturday 7 August | Redfern Park | |
| 17 | Canterbury-Bankstown | Win | 22 – 16 | Saturday 14 August | Redfern Park | |
| 18 | St. George | Loss | 15 – 31 | Saturday 21 August | Hurstville Oval | |

== Player statistics ==
| Name | App | T | G | FG | Pts |
|---|---|---|---|---|---|
| Keith Aitken | 18 | 3 | 0 | 0 | 9 |
| Leonard Allmond | 18 | 11 | 0 | 0 | 33 |
| Eric Anderson | 3 | 1 | 0 | 0 | 3 |
| Doug Barwick | 5 | 0 | 0 | 0 | 0 |
| Max Bennett | 1 | 0 | 0 | 0 | 0 |
| Ron Brightwell | 4 | 0 | 0 | 0 | 0 |
| Ken Brogan | 17 | 4 | 2 | 0 | 16 |
| Clive Churchill | 9 | 0 | 5 | 0 | 10 |
| William Collins | 8 | 0 | 0 | 0 | 0 |
| Leslie Cowie | 9 | 3 | 0 | 0 | 9 |
| Ed Crawford | 4 | 1 | 0 | 0 | 3 |
| Terry Crowe | 5 | 0 | 0 | 0 | 0 |
| Bruce Devlin | 13 | 2 | 0 | 0 | 6 |
| Denis Donoghue | 8 | 3 | 0 | 0 | 9 |
| James Evans | 1 | 0 | 0 | 0 | 0 |
| Gordon Glasscock | 4 | 0 | 3 | 0 | 6 |
| John Graves | 9 | 8 | 17 | 0 | 58 |
| Howard Hallett | 13 | 0 | 3 | 0 | 6 |
| Len Haskins | 1 | 1 | 0 | 0 | 3 |
| Jim Hunt | 2 | 0 | 0 | 0 | 0 |
| Alec Johnston | 1 | 0 | 0 | 0 | 0 |
| George Kempshall | 6 | 3 | 0 | 0 | 9 |
| Allan Melville | 11 | 4 | 0 | 0 | 12 |
| George Morton | 2 | 1 | 0 | 0 | 3 |
| William Mullane | 4 | 0 | 0 | 0 | 0 |
| Don Murdoch | 5 | 1 | 0 | 0 | 3 |
| Norm Nilson | 3 | 0 | 0 | 0 | 0 |
| Jimmy O'Connor | 13 | 3 | 0 | 0 | 9 |
| John Payne | 1 | 0 | 0 | 0 | 0 |
| Jack Quinlivan | 1 | 0 | 0 | 0 | 0 |
| Rupert Rayner | 9 | 3 | 0 | 0 | 9 |
| Barry Redding | 15 | 1 | 20 | 0 | 43 |
| Norm Spillane | 1 | 1 | 0 | 0 | 3 |
| Alan Stolzenheim | 3 | 1 | 0 | 0 | 3 |
| Ian Verrender | 7 | 0 | 0 | 0 | 0 |
| Totals | 195 | 54 | 51 | 0 | 264 |
