= List of South Sydney Rabbitohs records =

The following is a list of the South Sydney Rabbitohs' club records. The list encompasses the first-grade honours won by South Sydney, records set by the club, their coaches and their players.

== Club records ==
These are NRL records which relate to the South Sydney Rabbitohs.

=== Grand finals ===
Most first grade premierships

21

Most reserve grade premierships

21

Highest score in a grand final

42 points versus Manly Sea Eagles in 1951 (Souths won 42–14)

Most tries in a grand final

8 tries versus Manly Sea Eagles in 1951

Most goals in a grand final

9 goals versus Manly Sea Eagles in 1951

Most tries in a grand final by an Individual Player

4 tries by Johnny Graves (rugby league) versus Manly Sea Eagles in 1951

Most field goals in a grand final by an Individual Player

4 field goals by Eric Simms versus Manly Sea Eagles in 1970 (Souths won 23–12)

Most points in all grand final appearances

42 points by Eric Simms (1965, 1967, 1968, 1969, 1970, 1971)

Most grand final successes as a captain

5 by Jack Rayner (1950, 1951, 1953, 1954, 1955)

Most grand final successes as a coach

5 by Jack Rayner (1950, 1951, 1953, 1954, 1955)

=== Premiership ===
Most goals in a season by an individual player

131 by Eric Simms in 1969

Most career field goals by an individual player

86 by Eric Simms between 1965 and 1975

Most career points scored by a forward

1,128 by Bernie Purcell between 1949–1952 and 1954–1960

Most field goals in a game by an individual player

5 by Eric Simms versus Penrith, Penrith Park, 27 July 1969 (Souths won 40–18)

=== World club records ===
Wins

Highest score in a WCC

39 points versus St. Helens in 2015 (Souths won 39–0)

=== Individual awards ===
==== Rothmans Medal winners ====
The Rothmans Medal was previously awarded to the player of the year.

- 1969 – Denis Pittard
- 1971 – Denis Pittard

==== Dally M Medal winners ====
The Dally M Medal is currently awarded to the player of the year.

- 1980 – Rocky Laurie

==== Harry Sunderland Medal winners ====
- 1970 – Ron Coote

==== NSW Player of the Year ====
- 1949, 1950 and 1952 – Clive Churchill
- 1953 – Jack Rayner
- 1968 and 1969 – Ron Coote

==== Sun-Herald Best and Fairest Player ====
- 1952 – Clive Churchill
- 1958 – Fred Nelson
- 1964 – Richie Powell
- 1972 and 1973 – Denis Pittard

==== E E Christensen Player of the Year (1946–1977) ====
- 1949, 1950 and 1952 – Clive Churchill
- 1953 – Jack Rayner
- 1968 and 1969 – Ron Coote

==== Claude Corbett Memorial Trophy ====
- 1950 and 1954 – Clive Churchill

==== Rugby League Week Player of the Year ====
- 1971 – Bob Grant

==== Dally M Rookie of the Year ====
- 1989 – Jim Serdaris
- 2008 – Chris Sandow
- 2012 – Adam Reynolds
- 2013 – George Burgess

==== ARL Hall of Fame inductees ====
- Harold Horder
- Clive Churchill
- Ron Coote
- George Treweek
- Sam Burgess
- Greg Inglis

==== Clive Churchill Medal ====
- 2014 – Sam Burgess

=== Individual records ===
==== Most first grade games for the club ====
Games played	Player	Years played
336	John Sutton	2004–2019
265	Alex Johnston	2014–
249	Tom Burgess	2013–2024
247	Cody Walker	2016–
231	Adam Reynolds	2012–2021
218	Nathan Merritt	2002–2003, 2006–2014
211	Bob McCarthy	1963–1975, 1978
208	Craig Coleman	1982–1992
207	Damien Cook	2016–2024
206	Eric Simms	1965–1975

==== Most points for the club ====
Points	Player	Games played
1,896 (38 tries, 860 goals, 22 field goals)	Adam Reynolds	231
1,841 (23 tries, 803 goals, 86 field goals)	Eric Simms	206
1,128 (36 tries, 510 goals)	Bernie Purcell	173
960 (240 tries)	Alex Johnston	265
836 (144 tries, 202 goals)	Benny Wearing	172
686 (55 tries, 229 goals, 5 field goals)	Latrell Mitchell	98
653 (146 tries, 34 goals, 1 field goal)	Nathan Merritt	218

==== Most points in a season ====
Points	Player	Games played	Season
265 (1 try, 112 goals, 19 field goals)	Eric Simms	24	1969
260 (5 tries, 118 goals, 2 field goals)	Adam Reynolds	25	2021
241 (3 tries, 96 goals, 20 field goals)	Eric Simms	22	1970
233 (3 tries, 100 goals, 12 field goals)	Eric Simms	24	1967
221 (7 tries, 95 goals, 3 field goals)	Adam Reynolds	26	2014

==== Most points in a match ====
Points	Player	Opponent	Venue	Date	Match score
29 (3 tries, 10 goals)	Johnny Graves	Eastern Suburbs	Sports Ground	Round 8, 1952	Souths won 50–0
27 (5 tries, 6 goals)	Johnny Graves	Eastern Suburbs	Redfern Oval	Round 14, 1949	Souths won 48–6
26 (3 tries, 7 goals)	Latrell Mitchell	Canterbury-Bankstown Bulldogs	Accor Stadium	Round 6, 2023	Souths won 50-16
24 (4 tries, 6 goals)	Terry Fahey	Penrith	Redfern Oval	Round 5, 1979	Souths won 39–9
24 (2 tries, 8 goals)	Latrell Mitchell	New Zealand Warriors	Sunshine Coast Stadium	Round 21, 2022	Souths won 48–10
23 (3 tries, 7 goals)	Johnny Graves	Parramatta	Redfern Oval	Round 10, 1948	Souths won 38–5
23 (1 try, 10 goals)	Johnny Graves	Newtown	Redfern Oval	Round 18, 1952	Souths won 41–2
22 (11 goals)	Eric Simms	Cronulla	Redfern Oval	Round 3, 1969	Souths won 43–4
22 (6 goals, 5 field goals)	Eric Simms	Penrith	Penrith Park	Round 18, 1969	Souths won 40–18
22 (2 tries, 8 goals)	Mark Ross	St George Dragons	Redfern Oval	Round 13, 1981	Souths won 34–17
22 (1 try, 9 goals)	Tony Melrose	Cronulla	Redfern Oval	Round 9, 1983	Souths won 46–10
22 (4 tries, 3 goals)	Latrell Mitchell	St George Illawarra Dragons	Accor Stadium	Round 7, 2026	Souths won 30-12

==== Most tries for the club ====
Tries scored	Player	Games played	Years played
240	Alex Johnston	265	2014–
146	Nathan Merritt	218	2002–2003, 2006–2014
144	Benny Wearing	172	1921–1933
109	Cody Walker	247	2016–
105	Ian Moir	110	1952–1958
102	Harold Horder	86	1912–1919, 1924
100	Bob McCarthy	211	1963–1975, 1978
88	Michael Cleary	140	1962–1970
79	Johnny Graves	77	1947–1952
71	Greg Inglis	146	2011–2019

==== Most tries in a season ====
Tries	Player	Games played	Season
30	Alex Johnston	22	2021
30	Alex Johnston	25	2022
30	Alex Johnston	22	2026
29	Les Brennan	19	1954
28	Johnny Graves	17	1951
23	Alex Johnston	22	2020
23	Ian Moir	19	1953
23	Nathan Merritt	22	2011
22	Nathan Merritt	24	2006
22	Alex Johnston	16	2026
21	Alex Johnston	15	2023

==== Most tries in a match ====
Tries	Player	Opponent	Venue	Date
5	Harold Horder	North Sydney	Sydney Showground	4 June 1917
5	Harold Horder	North Sydney	Sydney Showground	14 June 1917
5	Alan Quinlivan	University	Earl Park	11 July 1936
5	Don Manson	University	Sports Ground	17 April 1937
5	Johnny Graves	Eastern Suburbs	Redfern Oval	16 July 1949
5	Ian Moir	Parramatta	Redfern Oval	6 June 1957
5	Eric Sladden	Parramatta	Cumberland Oval	10 August 1957
5	Nathan Merritt	Parramatta	ANZ Stadium	8 August 2011
5	Alex Johnston	Penrith	ANZ Stadium	2 July 2017
5	Alex Johnston	Sydney Roosters	ANZ Stadium	25 September 2020

==== Most goals for the club ====
Goals	Player	Games played
889^{1}	Eric Simms	206
882^{2}	Adam Reynolds	231
510	Bernie Purcell	173
237^{3}	Neil Baker	87
234	Latrell Mitchell	98

^{1} includes 86 field goals

^{2} includes 22 field goals

^{3} includes 31 field goals

^{4} includes 4 field goals

==== Most goals in a season ====
Goals	Player	Games played	Season
131^{1}	Eric Simms	24	1969
120^{2}	Adam Reynolds	25	2021
116^{3}	Eric Simms	22	1970
112^{4}	Eric Simms	24	1967
100^{5}	Adam Reynolds	26	2013

^{1} includes 19 field goals

^{2} includes 2 field goals

^{3} includes 20 field goals

^{4} includes 12 field goals

^{5} includes 2 field goals

==== Most goals in a match ====
Goals	Player	Opponent	Venue	Date	Match score
11	Eric Simms	Cronulla	Redfern Oval	11 April 1969	Souths won 43 – 4
11^{1}	Eric Simms	Penrith	Penrith Park	27 July 1969	Souths won 40 – 18
10	Arthur Oxford	University	Marrickville Oval	1 September 1920	Souths won 47 – 5
10	Johnny Graves	Eastern Suburbs	Sydney Sports Ground	7 July 1952	Souths won 50 – 0
10	Johnny Graves	Newtown	Redfern Oval	23 August 1952	Souths won 41 – 2
10	Adam Reynolds	Sydney Roosters	ANZ Stadium	25 September 2020	Souths won 60 – 8

^{1} includes 5 field goals

=== Team records ===
==== Biggest winning margins ====
Margin	Score	Opponent	Venue	Date
67	67–0	Western Suburbs	Sydney Showground	23 July 1910
63	63–0	University	Sports Ground	17 April 1937
54	59–5	Penrith	Redfern Oval	11 May 1980
53	53–0	North Sydney	Sports Ground	12 August 1939
52	60–8	Sydney Roosters	ANZ Stadium	25 September 2020
50	50–0	Eastern Suburbs	Sports Ground	7 June 1952
50	56–6	Parramatta Eels	ANZ Stadium	8 August 2011

==== Biggest losing margins ====
Margin	Score	Opponent	Venue	Date
66	0–66	New Zealand Warriors	Telstra Stadium	25 June 2006
62	0–62	Sydney City Roosters	Sydney Football Stadium	25 April 1996
60	0–60	Newcastle Knights	EnergyAustralia Stadium	8 August 1999
58	6-64	Melbourne Storm	AAMI Park	26 August 2017
54	0-54	Parramatta Eels	Parramatta Stadium	10 August 2002
52	8-60	North Queensland Cowboys	Dairy Farmers Stadium	23 August 2003

=== Biggest wins vs active teams ===
Margin	Score	Opposition	Venue	Date
54	59–5	Penrith Panthers	Redfern Oval	11 May 1980
52	60–8	Sydney Roosters	ANZ Stadium	25 September 2020
50	56–6	Parramatta Eels	ANZ Stadium	8 August 2011
46	52–6	Newcastle Knights	ANZ Stadium	25 July 2015
46	46–0	Brisbane Broncos	Suncorp Stadium	17 June 2021
44	54–10	Wests Tigers	ANZ Stadium	17 May 2013
42	48-6	Melbourne Storm	AAMI Park	25 April 2026
40	56–16	Manly Warringah Sea Eagles	ANZ Stadium	22 August 2020
40	40–0	St. George Illawarra Dragons	Accor Stadium	21 August 2025
39	43–4	Cronulla-Sutherland	Redfern Oval	11 April 1969
38	38–0	Canterbury-Bankstown Bulldogs	Stadium Australia	2 April 2021
38	60–22; 48–10	New Zealand Warriors	Sunshine Coast Stadium; Sunshine Coast Stadium	24 July 2021; 6 August 2022
34	46–12	Gold Coast Titans	Cbus Super Stadium	8 June 2024
30	37–7; 32–2	Canberra Raiders	Redfern Oval; ANZ Stadium	27 February 1982; 28 June 2013
28	32–4	North Queensland Cowboys	ANZ Stadium	7 June 2010
22	36–14	Dolphins	Suncorp Stadium	13 April 2023

=== Biggest losses vs active teams ===
Margin	Score	Opposition	Venue	Date
66	0–66	New Zealand Warriors	ANZ Stadium	25 June 2006
62	0–62	Sydney City Roosters	Sydney Football Stadium	25 April 1996
60	0–60	Newcastle Knights	Marathon Stadium	8 August 1999
58	6–64	Melbourne Storm	AAMI Park	26 August 2017
54	0–54	Manly Warringah Sea Eagles	Brookvale Oval	24 August 1975
54	0–54	Parramatta Eels	Parramatta Stadium	10 August 2002
52	8–60	North Queensland Cowboys	Dairy Farmers Stadium	23 August 2003
50	6–56	Brisbane Broncos	ANZ Stadium	13 August 1995
50	12–62	Canterbury-Bankstown Bulldogs	Sydney Football Stadium	3 August 2003
50	6–56	Wests Tigers	Leichhardt Oval	8 August 2004
50	4–54	Canberra Raiders	ANZ Stadium	31 July 2016
44	12–56	Penrith Panthers	Apex Oval	23 May 2021
42	0–42	Cronulla-Sutherland Sharks	Caltex Field	27 August 1994
42	16–58	St. George Illawarra Dragons	WIN Stadium	18 August 2002
22	28–50	Dolphins	Suncorp Stadium	28 June 2025
8	14–22; 14–22	Gold Coast Titans	Skilled Park; ANZ Stadium	2 May 2009; 14 August 2009

=== Biggest wins vs discontinued teams ===
Margin	Score	Opposition	Venue	Date
67	67–0	Western Suburbs	Royal Agricultural Society Showground	23 July 1910
63	63–0	University	Sydney Sports Ground	17 April 1937
53	53–0	North Sydney	Sydney Sports Ground	12 August 1939
39	41–2	Newtown	Redfern Oval	23 August 1952
37	39–2	Balmain Tigers	Redfern Oval	20 April 1975
36	48–12	Illawarra Steelers	Redfern Oval	7 August 1983
32	36–4; 32–0	St. George Dragons	Belmore Sports Ground; Sydney Football Stadium	4 April 1988; 22 April 1989
32	48–16	South Queensland Crushers	Redfern Oval	14 July 1996
27	29–2; 31–4	Glebe	Royal Agricultural Society Showground; Sydney Sports Ground	29 May 1909; 13 July 1929
26	34–8	Annandale	Royal Agricultural Society Showground	16 July 1910
24	44–20	Northern Eagles	Sydney Football Stadium	30 March 2002
21	23–2	Cumberland	Royal Agricultural Society Showground	9 May 1908
20	20–0	Newcastle	Royal Agricultural Society Showground	14 August 1909
18	30–12	Gold Coast Seagulls	Sydney Football Stadium	14 May 1994
6	24–18	Western Reds	Redfern Oval	23 June 1996
–	–	Adelaide Rams	–	–

=== Biggest losses vs discontinued teams ===
Margin	Score	Opposition	Venue	Date
45	8–53	Western Suburbs	Pratten Park	21 June 1958
42	5–47	Newtown	Sydney Cricket Ground	8 July 1944
42	14–56	Illawarra Steelers	Steelers Stadium	14 April 1996
42	4–46	North Sydney Bears	North Sydney Oval	25 August 1996
36	7–43	Balmain	Leichhardt Oval	27 July 1946
36	4–40; 6–42	St. George Dragons	Sydney Cricket Ground; Sydney Football Stadium	16 August 1958; 11 July 1993
26	12–38	Gold Coast Seagulls	Sydney Football Stadium	5 August 1990
17	7–24	Glebe	Sydney Sports Ground	10 June 1922
16	18–34	Adelaide Rams	Sydney Football Stadium	12 July 1998
5	0–5	Newcastle	Newcastle Showground	7 August 1909
4	14–18	Western Reds	WACA Ground	16 June 1995
1	2–3	Annandale	Erskineville Oval	17 July 1915
1	16–17	South Queensland Crushers	Suncorp Stadium	3 August 1997
–	–	Cumberland	–	–
–	–	Northern Eagles	–	–
–	–	University	–	–

==== Longest winning streak ====
16 (2 May 1925 – 8 May 1926)

==== Longest losing streak ====
22 (23 June 1945 – 12 April 1947)

==== Golden point games ====
Played	Won	Drawn	Lost
20	8	4	8

Opponent	Result	Score	Venue	Date
New Zealand Warriors	Loss	30–31	Sydney Football Stadium	19 June 2003
Wests Tigers	Win	17–16	Sydney Football Stadium	21 March 2004
North Queensland Cowboys	Draw	20–20	Express Advocate Stadium	15 May 2004
Brisbane Broncos	Draw	34–34	Sydney Football Stadium	28 August 2004
Canterbury Bulldogs	Draw	21–21	Sydney Showground	4 June 2005
Parramatta Eels	Draw	16–16	ANZ Stadium	22 May 2009
Gold Coast Titans	Loss	18–19	ANZ Stadium	20 Mar 2010
Wests Tigers	Win	34–30	ANZ Stadium	7 Aug 2010
Sydney Roosters	Win	21–20	ANZ Stadium	16 Jul 2011
North Queensland Cowboys	Win	26–24	ANZ Stadium	19 August 2011
Wests Tigers	Win	17–16	Allianz Stadium	1 Apr 2012
St. George Illawarra Dragons	Win	19–18	Jubilee Oval	20 May 2012
St. George Illawarra Dragons	Loss	18–22	ANZ Stadium	22 July 2013
Gold Coast Titans	Loss	29–28	nib Stadium	5 June 2016
Melbourne Storm	Loss	15–14	AAMI Park	6 August 2016
Manly-Warringah Sea Eagles	Loss	13–12	Lottoland	13 July 2019
Wests Tigers	Win	18–14	ANZ Stadium	17 April 2021
Cronulla Sharks	Loss	21–20	Shark Park	30 July 2022
Manly-Warringah Sea Eagles	Win	13-12	Accor Stadium	25 March 2023
Melbourne Storm	Loss	25–24	Accor Stadium	21 June 2025

==== Premiership finals losses ====
Team	Current team	Total	Years
Balmain Tigers	N	8	1989 1986 1969 1956 1944 1939 1924 1916
Sydney Roosters	Y	7	2019 2018 1938 1935 1934 1923 1911
Manly-Warringah Sea Eagles	Y	4	2013 2007 1968 1957
Penrith Panthers	Y	3	2022 2021 2020
Canberra Raiders	Y	3	2019 1989 1987
Western Suburbs	N	3	1952 1932 1930
Melbourne Storm	Y	2	2018 2012
Canterbury Bulldogs	Y	2	2012 1986
St George	N	2	1965 1949
Newtown	N	2	1933 1910
Cronulla Sharks	Y	1	2015
Total		37	

=== Attendance records ===
Sydney Football Stadium - currently known as Allianz Stadium (1988–2005, 2022)

40,000 – South Sydney Rabbitohs v Balmain Tigers (major semi-final, 10 September 1989)

39,816 - South Sydney Rabbitohs v Sydney Roosters (elimination final, 11 September 2022)

39,733 - South Sydney Rabbitohs v Cronulla Sharks (preliminary final, 17 September 2022)

Redfern Oval (1948–1987)

23,257 – South Sydney Rabbitohs v Manly Sea Eagles (Round 20, 19 July 1987). A crowd of over 25,000 watched Souths rook on the US team, the Tomahawks, while Souths were excluded from the NRL.

ANZ Stadium - currently known as Accor Stadium (2006 – present)

83,833 – South Sydney Rabbitohs v Canterbury-Bankstown Bulldogs (grand final, 5 October 2014)

Sydney Cricket Ground (1908 – present)

78,056 – South Sydney Rabbitohs v St George Dragons (grand final, 18 September 1965)

== See also ==
- List of NRL records
