= 1950 South Sydney season =

South Sydney Rabbitohs season

- NSWRFL Rank: 1st
- Play-off result: Premiers
- 1950 record: Wins: 14; draws: 0; losses: 4
- Points scored: For: 323; against: 228

Team information
- Coach-Captain: Rupert Rayner/Dave Watson
- Captain: Rupert Rayner
- Stadium: Redfern Oval

Top scorers
- Tries: John Graves (10)
- Goals: Bernard Purcell (52)
- Points: Bernard Purcell (128)
← 1949	List of seasons	1951 →

The 1950 South Sydney season was the 43rd in the club's history. The club competed in the New South Wales Rugby Football League Premiership (NSWRFL), finishing the season as premiers and minor premiers.

== Ladder ==
	Team	Pld	W	D	L	PF	PA	PD	Pts
1	South Sydney	18	14	0	4	323	228	+95	28
2	Balmain	18	12	2	4	255	208	+47	26
3	Newtown	18	11	2	5	347	269	+78	24
4	Western Suburbs	18	10	2	6	307	259	+48	22
5	St. George	18	9	3	6	336	261	+75	21
6	Canterbury-Bankstown	18	9	0	9	296	277	+19	18
7	Eastern Suburbs	18	7	0	11	237	345	-108	14
8	Manly-Warringah	18	6	0	12	231	293	-62	12
9	Parramatta	18	3	3	12	203	296	-93	9
10	North Sydney	18	3	0	15	258	357	-99	6

== Fixtures ==
=== Regular season ===
Round	Opponent	Result	Score	Date	Venue	Crowd	Ref
1	Canterbury-Bankstown	Win	20 – 17	Saturday 8 April	Belmore Sports Ground		
2	Parramatta	Loss	12 – 16	Monday 10 April	Sydney Cricket Ground	15,100	
3	Western Suburbs	Win	23 – 9	Saturday 15 April	Redfern Park		
4	St. George	Win	17 – 15	Saturday 22 April	Kogarah	12,500	
5	North Sydney	Win	23 – 15	Tuesday 25 April	Redfern Park		
6	Newtown	Loss	10 – 20	Saturday 29 April	Sydney Cricket Ground	32,800	
7	Eastern Suburbs	Win	21 – 15	Saturday 6 May	Redfern Park		
8	Manly-Warringah	Win	45 – 11	Saturday 27 May	Redfern Park		
9	Balmain	Win	14 – 10	Saturday 10 June	Sydney Cricket Ground	24,300	
10	Canterbury-Bankstown	Win	5 – 0	Saturday 17 June	Sydney Cricket Ground	9,300	
11	Parramatta	Win	17 – 6	Saturday 24 June	Redfern Park		
12	Western Suburbs	Win	29 – 22	Saturday 1 July	Pratten Park		
13	St. George	Win	17 – 14	Saturday 8 July	Redfern Oval	30,200	
14	North Sydney	Win	10 – 5	Saturday 29 July	North Sydney Oval		
15	Newtown	Loss	12 – 17	Saturday 5 August	Sports Ground	18,700	
16	Eastern Suburbs	Win	30 – 4	Saturday 13 August	Redfern Park	17,000	
17	Manly-Warringah	Win	13 – 10	Saturday 19 August	Brookvale	3,000	
18	Balmain	Loss	12 – 17	Saturday 26 August	Sports Ground	21,500	

=== Finals ===
Home	Score	Away	Match Information
Home	Score	Away	Date and Time	Venue	Referee	Crowd
Semifinals
South Sydney	30–4	Newtown	2 September 1950	Sydney Cricket Ground	George Bishop	33,514
Balmain	10–28	Western Suburbs	9 September 1950	Sydney Sports Ground	Tom McMahon	33,542
Final
South Sydney	21–15	Western Suburbs	16 September 1950	Sydney Sports Ground	Tom McMahon	32,373
