= 1951 South Sydney season =

South Sydney Rabbitohs season

- NSWRFL Rank: 1st
- Play-off result: Won Grand final
- 1951 record: Wins: 16; draws: 1; losses: 1
- Points scored: For: 428; against: 237

Team information
- Coach-Captain: Rupert Rayner
- Captain: Rupert Rayner
- Stadium: Redfern Oval

Top scorers
- Tries: John Graves (28)
- Goals: Bernard Purcell (50)
- Points: Bernard Purcell (146)
← 1950	List of seasons	1952 →

The 1951 South Sydney was the 44th in the club's history. The club competed in the New South Wales Rugby Football League Premiership (NSWRFL), finishing the season as repeat premiers.

== Ladder ==
	Team	Pld	W	D	L	PF	PA	PD	Pts
1	South Sydney	18	16	1	1	428	237	+191	33
2	Manly-Warringah	18	11	0	7	424	262	+162	22
3	St. George	18	10	1	7	374	251	+123	21
4	Western Suburbs	18	10	0	8	360	333	+27	20
5	Eastern Suburbs	18	9	0	9	304	340	-36	18
6	Parramatta	18	9	0	9	309	410	-101	18
7	Canterbury-Bankstown	18	7	0	11	266	362	-96	14
8	Newtown	18	6	0	12	261	341	-80	12
9	Balmain	18	6	0	12	283	365	-82	12
10	North Sydney	18	5	0	13	220	328	-108	10

== Fixtures ==
=== Regular season ===
Round	Opponent	Result	Score	Date	Venue	Crowd	Ref
1	North Sydney	Win	20 – 6	Saturday 7 April	North Sydney Oval		
2	Eastern Suburbs	Win	21 – 14	Saturday 14 April	Sports Ground	8,600	
3	Balmain	Win	16 – 10	Saturday 21 April	Redfern Oval	8,400	
4	Manly-Warringah	Win	29 – 17	Wednesday 25 April	Royal Agricultural Society Showground	9,400	
5	Western Suburbs	Win	36 – 14	Saturday 28 April	Sydney Cricket Ground	28,400	
6	Newtown	Win	23 – 17	Saturday 5 May	Sydney Cricket Ground	22,800	
7	St. George	Draw	16 – 16	Wednesday 9 May	Sydney Cricket Ground	50,000	
8	Canterbury-Bankstown	Win	67 – 0	Saturday 26 May	Sports Ground	15,300	
9	Parramatta	Win	36 – 10	Saturday 9 June	Sydney Cricket Ground	14,300	
10	North Sydney	Win	18 – 9	Saturday 16 June	Redfern Oval		
11	Eastern Suburbs	Loss	19 – 22	Sunday 22 June	Redfern Oval		
12	Balmain	Win	7 – 33	Saturday 30 June	Leichhardt Oval	16,800	
13	Manly-Warringah	Win	16 – 12	Saturday 7 July	Sports Ground	13,400	
14	Western Suburbs	Win	16 – 12	Saturday 28 July	Pratten Park		
15	Newtown	Win	25 – 18	Saturday 4 August	Redfern Oval	5,500	
16	St. George	Win	22 – 15	Saturday 11 August	Sydney Cricket Ground	30,800	
17	Canterbury-Bankstown	Win	23 – 19	Saturday 18 August	Redfern Oval	39,700	
18	Parramatta	Win	10 – 50	Saturday 25 August	Cumberland	28,600	

=== Finals ===
Home	Score	Away	Match Information
Home	Score	Away	Date and Time	Venue	Referee	Crowd
Semifinals
South Sydney	8–35	St. George	1 September 1951	Sydney Cricket Ground	Aub Oxford	39,735
Final
South Sydney	42–14	Manly-Warringah	23 September 1951	Sydney Sports Ground	Jack O'Brien	28,505

== Records ==
Many notable club and NSWRL/NRL records were set in the 1951 season.

=== Club records ===
- Highest Score in a Grand Final: 42 points versus Manly-Warringah in 1951 (Souths won 42–14)
- Most Tries in a Grand Final: 8 tries versus Manly-Warringah in 1951
- Most Goals in a Grand Final: 9 goals versus Manly-Warringah in 1951
- Most Tries in a Grand Final by an Individual Player: 4 tries by John Graves versus Manly-Warringah in 1951
- Most Tries in a season by an Individual Player: 28 tries by John Graves from 17 games

=== NSWRL/NRL records ===
- Most Tries in a season by an Individual Player

28 tries by John Graves at the time, tied Bobby Lulham (1947) for second (behind Dave Brown (1935) with 38). As of 2021, ranks as the 5th highest try total by a player in a season (tied with Tom Trbojevic - 2021 and Lulham - 1947).
