= 1949 South Sydney season =

New South Wales Rugby League season

- NSWRFL Rank: 1st
- Play-off result: Runner-ups
- 1949 record: Wins: 13; draws: 1; losses: 4
- Points scored: For: 360; against: 210

Team information
- Coach: Dave Watson
- Captain: Rupert Rayner
- Stadium: Redfern Oval

Top scorers
- Tries: Len Allmond (17)
- Goals: Bernard Purcell (27)
- Points: John Graves (82)
← 1948	List of seasons	1950 →

The 1949 South Sydney was the 42nd in the club's history. The club competed in the New South Wales Rugby Football League Premiership (NSWRFL), finishing the season as runner-ups and minor premiers.

== Ladder ==
	Team	Pld	W	D	L	PF	PA	PD	Pts
1	South Sydney	18	13	1	4	360	210	+150	27
2	Western Suburbs	18	12	0	6	365	280	+85	24
3	St. George	18	11	1	6	345	231	+114	23
4	Balmain	18	10	2	6	265	206	+59	22
5	Parramatta	18	8	4	6	311	269	+42	20
6	Newtown	18	9	1	8	358	332	+26	19
7	Canterbury-Bankstown	18	6	2	10	236	337	−101	14
8	Manly-Warringah	18	6	1	11	171	293	−122	13
9	North Sydney	18	5	1	12	253	369	−116	11
10	Eastern Suburbs	18	3	1	14	214	351	−137	7

== Fixtures ==
=== Regular season ===
Round	Opponent	Result	Score	Date	Venue	Crowd	Ref
1	Canterbury-Bankstown	Draw	14 – 14	Saturday 9 April	Belmore Sports Ground	6,700	
2	Newtown	Win	19 – 9	Saturday 16 April	Sports Ground	18,600	
3	Manly-Warringah	Win	32 – 0	Monday 25 April	Brookvale	5,000	
4	Parramatta	Win	26 – 22	Saturday 30 April	Sydney Cricket Ground	24,600	
5	Eastern Suburbs	Win	15 – 10	Saturday 7 May	Sports Ground		
6	North Sydney	Win	30 – 15	Saturday 14 May	Redfern Park	6,000	
7	Western Suburbs	Win	13 – 6	Saturday 21 May	Pratten Park	4,600	
8	Balmain	Win	11 – 7	Saturday 28 May	Sports Ground	22,600	
9	St. George	Loss	2 – 22	Saturday 11 June	Sydney Cricket Ground	37,200	
10	Canterbury-Bankstown	Loss	12 – 15	Monday 13 June	Redfern Park		
11	Newtown	Win	16 – 12	Saturday 25 June	Sports Ground	17,200	
12	Manly-Warringah	Win	32 – 10	Saturday 2 July	Redfern Park		
13	Parramatta	Loss	13 – 14	Saturday 9 July	Cumberland Oval		
14	Eastern Suburbs	Win	48 – 6	Saturday 16 July	Redfern Oval		
15	North Sydney	Win	25 – 10	Saturday 23 July	North Sydney Oval	6,100	
16	Western Suburbs	Loss	13 – 18	Saturday 30 July	Sports Ground	16,800	
17	Balmain	Win	17 – 16	Saturday 6 August	Sydney Cricket Ground	24,800	
18	St. George	Win	22 – 4	Saturday 13 August	Sydney Cricket Ground	33,800	

=== Finals ===
Home	Score	Away	Match information
Home	Score	Away	Date and time	Venue	Referee	Crowd
Semifinals
South Sydney	12–16	St. George	20 August 1949	Sydney Cricket Ground	Tom McMahon	41,700
Grand Final
South Sydney	12–19	St. George	10 September 1949	Sydney Cricket Ground	George Bishop	56,500
