= 1952 South Sydney season =

- NSWRFL Rank: 3rd
- Play-off result: Lost Grand final
- 1952 record: Wins: 12; draws: 1; losses: 6
- Points scored: For: 344; against: 189

Team information
- Coach-Captain: Rupert John Reyner
- Captain: Rupert John Reyner
- Stadium: Redfern Oval

Top scorers
- Tries: John Graves (16)
- Points: John Graves (168)
← 1951	List of seasons	1953 →

The 1952 South Sydney DRLFC season was the 45th in the club's history. They competed in the New South Wales Rugby Football League's 1952 Premiership, and lost the grand final against the Western Suburbs.

== Ladder ==
	Team	Pld	W	D	L	PF	PA	PD	Pts
1	Western Suburbs	18	14	1	3	331	264	+67	29
2	St. George	18	13	0	5	375	279	+96	26
3	South Sydney	18	12	0	6	344	189	+155	24
4	North Sydney	18	11	0	7	384	247	+137	22
5	Manly	18	11	0	7	334	261	+73	22
6	Balmain	18	8	0	10	351	256	+95	16
7	Newtown	18	6	0	12	210	341	-131	12
8	Eastern Suburbs	18	6	0	12	259	397	-138	12
9	Canterbury	18	5	1	12	214	386	-172	11
10	Parramatta	18	3	0	15	241	423	-182	6

== Results ==
Round	Opponent	Result	South	Opponent	Date	Venue
1	Manly Warringah	Loss	12	16	Saturday 29 March	Sydney Cricket Ground
2	Western Suburbs	Loss	13	15	Saturday 5 April	Redfern Oval
3	Parramatta	Win	29	9	Saturday 12 April	Redfern Oval
4	Balmain	Win	19	16	Monday 14 April	Leichhardt Oval
5	North Sydney	Lose	13	16	Saturday 19 April	North Sydney Oval
6	Newtown	Win	9	5	Saturday 26 April	Redfern Oval
7	Canterbury	Win	36	14	Saturday 3 May	Redfern Oval
8	Eastern Suburbs	Win	50	0	Saturday 7 June	Sydney Sports Ground
9	St George	Win	9	7	Saturday 14 June	Sydney Sports Ground
10	Manly Warringah	Win	17	12	Saturday 21 June	Sydney Cricket Ground
11	Western Suburbs	Win	15	10	Saturday 28 June	Sydney Cricket Ground
12	Parramatta	Loss	3	9	Saturday 5 July	Cumberland Oval
13	Balmain	Loss	17	19	Saturday 12 July	Sydney Sports Ground
14	North Sydney	Win	14	8	Saturday 19 July	Redfern Oval
15	Canterbury	Win	23	11	Saturday 2 August	Belmore Sports Ground
16	Eastern Suburbs	Win	19	11	Saturday 9 August	Redfern Oval
17	St George	Loss	5	10	Saturday 16 August	Sydney Cricket Ground
18	Newtown	Win	41	2	Saturday 23 August	Redfern Oval
Semi Final	Western Suburbs	Win	18	10	Saturday 30 August	Sydney Cricket Ground
Final	North Sydney	Win	26	12	Saturday 13 September	Sydney Cricket Ground
Grand Final	Western Suburbs	Loss	12	22	Saturday 20 September	Sydney Cricket Ground
