= 1953 South Sydney season =

- NSWRFL Rank: 1st
- 1953 record: Wins: 11; draws: 1; losses: 6
- Points scored: For: 384; against: 278

Team information
- Coach-Captain: Rupert John Reyner
- Captain: Rupert John Reyner
- Stadium: Redfern Oval

Top scorers
- Tries: Ian Moir (23)
- Points: Ian Moir (69)
← 1952	List of seasons	1954 →

The 1953 South Sydney Rabbitohs season was the 46th in the club's history. They competed in the New South Wales Rugby Football League's 1953 Premiership, and won the grand final.

== Ladder ==
	Team	Pld	W	D	L	PF	PA	PD	Pts
1	South Sydney	18	11	1	6	384	278	+106	23
2	St. George	18	11	0	7	313	289	+24	22
3	North Sydney	18	10	1	7	421	283	+138	21
4	Eastern Suburbs	18	10	1	7	330	310	+20	21
5	Newtown	18	9	2	7	292	268	+24	20
6	Canterbury	18	9	2	7	252	291	-39	20
7	Parramatta	18	8	1	9	271	291	-20	17
8	Balmain	18	7	0	11	313	377	-64	14
9	Manly	18	6	0	12	294	393	-99	12
10	Western Suburbs	18	5	0	13	287	377	-90	10

== Results ==
Round	Opponent	Result	Score	Date	Venue
1	Western Suburbs	Loss	28 – 44	Saturday 4 April	Sydney Cricket Ground
2	Newtown	Loss	12 – 24	Monday 6 April	Redfern Oval
3	Eastern Suburbs	Loss	18 – 22	Saturday 11 April	Sydney Sports Ground
4	Manly Warringah	Win	19 – 12	Saturday 18 April	Redfern Oval
5	St George	Win	23 – 10	Saturday 18 April	Sydney Cricket Ground
6	Canterbury	Win	14 – 2	Saturday 2 May	Sydney Cricket Ground
7	North Sydney	Loss	13 – 43	Saturday 9 May	Sydney Sports Ground
8	Parramatta	Win	27 – 12	Saturday 6 June	Redfern Oval
9	Balmain	Loss	12 – 16	Saturday 13 June	Redfern Oval
10	Western Suburbs	Win	13 – 9	Saturday 20 June	Redfern Oval
11	Newtown	Draw	5 – 5	Saturday 27 June	Erskineville Oval
12	Eastern Suburbs	Win	21 – 2	Saturday 4 July	Redfern Oval
13	Manly Warringah	Win	27 – 5	Saturday 11 July	Brookvale Oval
14	St George	Loss	15 – 18	Saturday 18 July	Kogerah Oval
15	Canterbury	Win	51 – 15	Saturday 1 August	Redfern Oval
16	North Sydney	Win	38 – 17	Saturday 8 August	Sydney Cricket Ground
17	Parramatta	Win	29 – 11	Saturday 15 August	Cumberland Oval
18	Balmain	Win	19 – 11	Saturday 22 August	Leichhardt Oval
SF	North Sydney	Win	5 – 4	Saturday 29 August	Sydney Cricket Ground
GF	St George	Win	31 – 12	Saturday 12 September	Sydney Cricket Ground
