= Don Murdoch (disambiguation) =

Don Murdoch is an ice hockey player.

Don or Donald Murdoch may also refer to:

- Donald Murdoch (cricketer)
- Don Murdoch (rugby league)
