= Barry Redding =

Australian rugby league player

Playing information
- Position: Centre, Lock, Five-eighth
Club
Years	Team	Pld	T	G	FG	P
1948–49	South Sydney	21	4	27	0	66
Representative
Years	Team	Pld	T	G	FG	P
1950	NSW Country	1	1	0	0	3
1950	North Coast	1	0	0	0	0

Barry Redding was an Australian professional rugby league footballer for South Sydney of the New South Wales Rugby League Premiership. Redding played club football in the 1940s, before playing in New South Wales representative teams in the early 1950s.

== Playing career ==
20-year-old Redding started his rugby league career in the opening round of the 1948 season. His team defeated Parramatta that game, with the help of his 2 goals. He scored the first try of his career in a 8-16 Round 5 loss to Newtown. After Round 13, Redding was reverted to the lock position for the remainder of the season, after playing the first half of the season as a five-eighth and centre. In Round 16, Redding kicked an impressive 6 goals in a win against the eventual wooden spooners of the year, North Sydney. South Sydney finished 7th, failing to qualify for the postseason that year. Redding finished the season with 1 try and a respectable 20 goals (43 points) in 15 appearances.

In Round 1 the following year, Redding scored a try in a draw against the Canterbury-Bankstown as a centre (where he would remain for the rest of his career). In Round 3, he had arguably the best game of his career, recording a try and 7 goals in a 32-0 win over Manly-Warringah, despite Souths' front-rower Norm Nilson being sent off.

Redding played the final game of his career in a Round 10 loss to Canterbury in 1949. Souths won the minor premiership and advanced to the grand final, but lost to St. George. Redding did not play in the finals and finished his club career with 4 tries and 27 goals in 21 appearances.

Despite retiring from club football, he did represent the New South Wales Country Firsts in May 1950. He scored a try, but his team lost by 38 points to New South Wales City Firsts. He did not play another game for NSW Country Firsts, however he did play a game a month later for the North Coast representative team. North Coast however, lost badly to Great Britain (who were on tour).
