= Norm Spillane =

Australian rugby league player

Personal information
- Full name: Norman Spillane

Playing information
- Position: Centre, Five-eighth
Club
| Years | Team | Pld | T | G | FG | P |
|---|---|---|---|---|---|---|
| 1948–53 | South Sydney | 42 | 13 | 0 | 0 | 39 |

Norm Spillane was an Australian rugby league footballer who played in the 1940s and 1950s. He played for South Sydney in the NSWRL competition during the club's second golden era where they won 5 premierships from 7 grand final appearances between 1949 and 1955.

== Playing career ==
Spillane made his first grade debut for South Sydney in 1948. The following season, Spillane made 16 appearances as Souths claimed the minor premiership and reached the grand final against St George. Spillane played at centre as Souths lost the grand final 19–12 with St George claiming their second premiership.

Spillane did not feature at all in the 1950 season as Souths defeated Western Suburbs in the grand final to claim their 12th premiership. Spillane returned in 1951 playing 9 games as Souths claimed another minor premiership and reached the grand final against Manly-Warringah who were appearing in the first decider.

Spillane played at five-eighth in the match as Souths defeated Manly by a then record score of 42–14 at the Sydney Sports Ground. In 1952, Souths reached their 4th grand final in a row against Western Suburbs. Souths would lose the grand final 22–12 with Spillane playing at five-eighth. The match was remembered due to its controversy with claims the referee George Bishop had put a big wager on Wests winning the game. Souths claimed that they were denied two fair tries and Wests had scored one try off a blatant knock on.

Spillane retired at the end of the 1953 season.
