= Keith Aitken =

Australian rugby league footballer

Personal information
- Full name: Keith Aitken
- Born: 13 June 1922
- Died: 5 December 1995 (aged 73)

Playing information
- Position: Second-row, Lock
Club
Years	Team	Pld	T	G	FG	P
1945–49	South Sydney	64	5	8	0	15
1952	Eastern Suburbs	2	0	0	0	0
	Total	66	5	8	0	15

Keith Aitken is an Australian former rugby league footballer who played for South Sydney and Eastern Suburbs.
