= Don Murdoch (rugby league) =

Australian rugby league footballer

Personal information
- Full name: Donald Murdoch

Playing information
- Position: Fullback
Club
Years	Team	Pld	T	G	FG	P
1948–56	South Sydney	45	3	8	1	27

Don Murdoch was an Australian rugby league footballer who played in the 1940s and 1950s for South Sydney in the New South Wales Rugby League (NSWRL) competition. Murdoch played for Souths during the club's second golden era where they won 5 premierships in 6 seasons.

== Playing career ==
Murdoch began his first grade career with South Sydney in 1948. Murdoch's arrival coincided with the emergence of future immortal and club legend Clive Churchill. Murdoch missed out on playing in the 1949, 1950 and 1951 grand finals due to Churchill being in the team.

In 1952, Churchill suffered an injury during the season and Murdoch finally was given a chance to play more regularly in the team. Murdoch played at fullback in the 1952 NSWRL grand final against Western Suburbs. Souths would lose the grand final 22-12. The match was remembered due to its controversy with claims the referee George Bishop had put a big wager on Wests winning the game. Souths claimed that they were denied two fair tries and Wests had scored one try off a blatant knock on.

Murdoch missed out on playing in the 1953 and 1954 premiership victories but was then recalled to the starting team in 1955 due to another injury sustained to Churchill. Souths would reach the 1955 NSWRL grand final after a 9-game winning streak including coming from behind in both finals games.

Murdoch played at fullback in the club's premiership victory over Newtown by a score of 12-11 which was played at the Sydney Cricket Ground in front of 45,000 spectators. Murdoch would retire the following season in 1956.
