= Norm Nilson =

Australian rugby league footballer

Personal information
- Full name: Norman Donald Nilson
- Born: 1927; Sydney, New South Wales, Australia
- Died: 18 August 2017 (aged 89–90); Port Macquarie, New South Wales

Playing information
- Position: Prop, Second-row
Club
Years	Team	Pld	T	G	FG	P
1948–56	South Sydney	24	3	0	0	9
- Source: As of 18 June 2019

Norman Donald Nilson (1927–2017) was an Australian rugby league footballer who played in the 1940s and 1950s.

== Playing career ==
Norm "Nipper' Nilson was the Souths' reserve grade captain was called into the front row for Souths NSWRFL grand final 12–11 win over Newtown in 1955.

== Post playing ==
'Nipper' Nilson later served a period as Souths' club president.

== Death ==
Nilson died on 18 August 2017 at his home at Port Macquarie, New South Wales age 90.
