= Bernie Purcell =

Australian RL coach and former Australia international rugby league footballer

Personal information
- Full name: Bernard Martin Purcell
- Born: 19 January 1928
- Died: 31 December 2001 (aged 73)

Playing information
- Position: Second-row
Club
Years	Team	Pld	T	G	FG	P
1948–48	Western Suburbs	12	2	10	0	26
1949–60	South Sydney	173	36	509	0	1,126
	Total	185	38	519	0
Representative
Years	Team	Pld	T	G	FG	P
1951–56	New South Wales	4	1	0	0	0
1950–57	Australia	1	0	0	0	0

Coaching information
Club
Years	Team	Gms	W	D	L	W%
1964–66	South Sydney	57	33	0	24	58
- Source: Whitaker

Bernie Purcell (1928–2001) was an Australian rugby league premiership winning footballer and coach. He was a goal-kicking second-row forward of the 1950s for the South Sydney Rabbitohs, the Australian national representative and the New South Wales state sides.

== Club career ==
He played 178 games with South Sydney between 1949 and 1960, scoring 36 tries and 509 goals for a total of 1,126 points. A Souths junior, he was the Australian first forward in the game to score over 1,000 career points. He was also the first Australian forward to kick over 500 career goals a record only matched by three other players up till 2011. He played in the 1950 – 1951 and 1954 – 1955 victorious Rabbitohs Grand Final teams shouldering the goal-kicking responsibilities in each of those matches.

In 1959, he overtook Tom Kirk's record for the most points scored in an NSWRFL career (1,042); Purcell's eventual total of 1,152 stood as the new career record for three seasons until it was bettered by Ron Willey in 1962.

== Representative career ==
Purcell represented Australia in one Test match (1950) and appeared four times for New South Wales (1951–1956). Purcell's sole Test appearance was in the third Test against Great Britain in 1950. This was the famous 5–2 victory that gave Australia the Ashes for the first time in thirty years. He was selected to represent Sydney against France during their 1951 tour of Australasia in a match that ended in a 19-all draw. Purcell also toured Great Britain with the 1956-57 Australian Kangaroos, playing seven tour matches against British sides but no Tests.

== Coaching career ==
Purcell coached the Rabbitohs (1964–1966) after his retirement as a player, the highlight being the 1965 Grand Final against St. George played at the Sydney Cricket Ground in front of a record crowd of 78,056. Souths lost a hard-fought encounter 12–8 against the then nine-times champions.

Bernie Purcell died on 31 December 2001, 19 days short of his 74th birthday.

== Sources ==
- The Encyclopaedia of Rugby League Players – South Sydney Rabbitohs, Alan Whiticker & Glen Hudson, Bas Publishing, 2005.

Sporting positions
Preceded by Tom Kirk; 1947	Record-holder; Most points in an NSWRFL career 1959 (1,043) – 1962 (1,152)	Succeeded by Ron Willey; 1962
