= John Graves (rugby league) =

Australia international rugby league footballer

Johnny Graves
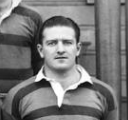

Personal information
- Full name: John Neal Graves
- Born: 19 January 1926 Maitland, New South Wales, Australia
- Died: 23 July 1983 (aged 57) Paddington, New South Wales, Australia

Playing information
- Position: Wing
Club
Years	Team	Pld	T	G	FG	P
1946	Maitland
1947–52	South Sydney	77	79	158	0	553
	Total	77	79	158	0	553
Representative
Years	Team	Pld	T	G	FG	P
1946	Newcastle
1948–51	Australia	7	5	14	0	43

John (Johnny) Graves (19 January 1926 – 23 July 1983) was an Australian rugby league footballer who played in the 1940s and 1950s. An Australian international representative goal-kicking wing, he played his club football for the South Sydney Rabbitohs, with whom he won back-to-back premierships in 1950–51.

== Club career ==
Whacka Graves scores his first of four tries in the 1951 Grand Final

Known as "Whacka", Graves commenced his footballing in Newcastle, New South Wales and came to the attention of Sydney talent scouts when he scored two tries in his international debut representing Newcastle against a touring British side in 1946.

Graves joined South Sydney in 1947 and after only four first grade games was selected for New South Wales. He formed a strong backline pairing with Clive Churchill and was victorious in Grand Finals with Souths in 1950 (scoring two tries) and in 1951 (scoring four tries).

Graves was appointed captain-coach of Cootamundra in 1954. The team won the Group 9 premiership.

== Representative career ==
He debuted for Australia against New Zealand in the 1st Test of 1948, played in the rest of that series and then toured Great Britain with the 1948 Kangaroos. He played in two Tests and twenty tour games returning as the side's top scorer with 16 tries and 35 goals for 188 points.

He represented for Australia in seven Test matches (3 Great Britain, 3 New Zealand and 1 France) between 1948 and 1951. He was selected to represent Sydney against France during their 1951 tour of Australasia in a match that ended in a 19-all draw.

== Records ==
He was the NSW Rugby Football League's top try-scorer season 1951 and his achievement that year of 28 tries in 17 games still stands in 5th place on the overall Australian list of Most Tries by an Individual in a Season. As of 2021, his record of four tries in a Grand Final, also achieved that season still stands.

He holds positions 1, 2, 4 and 5 in the table of Most Points in a Match for the Rabbitohs with respectively 29 points (Round 8, 1952 v Easts); 27 points (Round 14, 1949 v Easts); 23 points(Round 18, 1952 v Newtown) and 23 points (Round 10, 1948 v Parramatta).

Along with five other Rabbitohs he has achieved the feat of scoring five tries in a single match (Round 14, 1949 v Easts.)

== Published sources ==
- Andrews, Malcolm (2006) The ABC of Rugby League, Austn Broadcasting Corpn, Sydney
- NRL Official 2007 Season Guide, News Magazines Surry Hills Sydney, for the National Rugby League
