= Jack Rayner =

Australia international rugby league footballer and coach

Personal information
- Full name: Rupert John Rayner
- Born: 11 April 1921 Coraki, New South Wales, Australia
- Died: 17 May 2008 (aged 87) Randwick, New South Wales, Australia

Playing information
- Position: Second-row
Club
Years	Team	Pld	T	G	FG	P
1946–57	South Sydney	194	58	8	0	190
Representative
Years	Team	Pld	T	G	FG	P
1947–54	New South Wales	16	4	0	0	12
1948–49	Australia	5	1	0	0	3

Coaching information
Club
Years	Team	Gms	W	D	L	W%
1949–57	South Sydney	162	113	5	44	70
1958–60	Parramatta	54	7	0	47	13
	Total	216	120	5	91	56

Rupert John Rayner (11 April 1921 – 17 May 2008) was an Australian state and national representative rugby league player and NSWRFL coach. His club playing career was with the South Sydney Rabbitohs from 1946 to 1957 and he also represented New South Wales on eleven occasions and played in five Test matches for the Australian national side.

== War service ==
Rayner served with the AIF in World War II in Papua New Guinea. He played rugby league in some inter-regiment games and was spotted by former Kangaroo and South Sydney coach Eric Lewis, who suggested that Rayner try out for Souths once the war ended.

== Club career ==
Jack Rayner was introduced to the club by South's stalwart, Eric Lewis. Rayner trialed with Souths in 1946 and was graded straight to first grade. The Rabbitohs had won only one match in 1945. Rayner broke his ankle early in the 1946 season and the club ended up winless that year.

In 1947, Rayner was selected as club captain due to his leadership skills and tough performances as a second rower and the club managed nine wins and began to move up the premiership ladder. In 1949 he was appointed the coach of the club as well as captain and Souths finished as minor-premiers and managed a Grand final appearance going down to St George in 1949 season decider.

Souths were by now the main premiership force and under Rayner entered their most successful era. For six consecutive seasons from 1950 the Rabbitohs were Grand Finalists, winning premierships in 1950, 1951, NSWRL season 1953, 1954 and 1955. They were denied by Western Suburbs in controversial circumstances in season 1952.

Rayner's fifth premiership win in 1955 stands as the record for the most number of grand final successes by an individual as captain (equaled by Ken Kearney's who also achieved five in 1960). As captain-coach for all of those wins Rayner was the first man to coach a side to five Grand Final victories, a record subsequently matched by Kearney and Jack Gibson and eventually beaten in 2006 by Wayne Bennett.

A knee injury saw him retire during the 1957 season aged 36. He had overtaken Benny Wearing's record for most games with the Rabbitohs.

== Representative career ==
=== New South Wales ===
Rayner was first called up to represent his state in 1947. He made eleven appearances for the New South Wales rugby league team scoring two tries with a total of six points. His last game for New South Wales was in 1954.

=== Australia ===
In 1948, he made his test debut for Australia in the first Test loss against New Zealand at the Sydney Cricket Ground. He was a reserve in the second test of that series in Brisbane.

He was selected in the 1948-49 Kangaroo tour and played in the first two Tests against Great Britain and in 22 minor tour matches, making the most number of match appearances in the touring party. His final test appearances came on Australia's tour of New Zealand in 1949.

== The man and his playing style ==
The True Blue reference quotes Clive Churchill describing Rayner "He was a brilliant tactician. I never saw a better forward in cover defence on the blind side than Rayner. Jack was the crankiest forward I played with but what a grand fellow he was".

Rayner was a Police Detective by occupation and a man whom the Sydney Telegraph obituary described as renowned for his sportsmanship and dignified manner and who embodied an "Australian tough but fair attitude".

== Coaching career ==
Jack Rayner took up the reins as South Sydney's player-coach in 1949 and held that role for all five of the premiership victories he enjoyed at Souths. His playing retirement in 1957 marked his coaching retirement at the club. Rayner coached the club to 5 premierships: 1950, 1951, 1953, 1954 and 1955.

For the 1958 NSWRFL season he took on the challenge as coach at Parramatta who had been wooden-spooners in 1956 and 1957 and consistent cellar-dwellers all through the 1950s. A turn-around proved too much to hope for and the Eels finished last in all three years under Rayner, winning no more than three games in each season.

== Accolades ==
In 2004 he was named by Souths as Coach of their South Sydney Dream Team, consisting of 17 players and a coach representing the club from 1908 through to 2004. While playing football Rayner served in the New South Wales Police Force and in 2008, rugby league's centenary year in Australia, he was named as captain-coach of a NSW Police "Team of the Century".

== Sources ==
- Andrews, Malcolm (2006) The ABC of Rugby League, Australian Broadcasting Corporation, Sydney
- NRL Official 2007 Season Guide, News Magazines Surry Hills Sydney, for the National Rugby League
- Heads, Ian (1992) True Blue, Ironbark, Sydney
- Sunday Telegraph, Jack Rayner obituary 18 May 2008, News Limited, Sydney
