= Redfern Oval =

Australian football ground

Ironmark High Performance Centre
- Redfern Oval, Rabbitohs vs Tigers trial game in 2009
- Interactive map of Ironmark High Performance Centre
- Full name: Redfern Oval
- Location: Redfern, Sydney, New South Wales, Australia
- Coordinates: 33°53′43″S 151°12′22″E
- Owner: City of Sydney
- Capacity: 5,000 (2,500 seated) (formerly 20,000)
- Surface: Grass
- Record attendance: 24,219
- Field size: 130 by 84 metres (427 ft × 276 ft)

Construction
- Opened: 1885 (as Redfern Park)
- Renovated: 1946, 1957, and 2007

Tenants
- South Sydney Rabbitohs (NSWRL) (1948–1987, 1996); South Sydney Rabbitohs (Training) (1948–2023); South Sydney Rabbitohs (NSW Cup) (1948–2006, 2019–present); South Sydney A-Grade (Finals); Redfern All Blacks

Redfern Oval is an Australian football ground, in the Sydney suburb of Redfern, New South Wales, Australia. The South Sydney Rabbitohs Rugby League Football Club played at Redfern Oval between 1948 and 1987. Rabbitoh supporters often refer to Redfern Oval as "The Holy Land".

== Description ==
The former National Rugby League ground had a main grandstand on the wing with seats on either side and a hill surrounding the rest of the ground with a few rows of seats near the fence. The total capacity of the ground was around the 20,000 mark, until the redevelopment.

The current ground has a lone grandstand with bench style seating, with the structure incorporating the Rabbitohs' training equipment/gym, as well as a cafe and basic luxury hospitality. The seating is covered by a large roof spanning the width of the structure. The stand is wheelchair accessible and also contains hearing loop accessibility.

The player's tunnel is accessed by a small staircase which is below field level. Around the rest of the ground (which is now all public park, including the field) is three rows of terraced, hill seating.

$19 million was spent by the City of Sydney Council to completely upgrade and renovate Redfern Oval which has allowed the Rabbitohs to return to Redfern in 2009 with state-of-the-art training facilities for players and coaches.

The upgrade offers the Rabbitohs a professional standard playing surface and facilities to allow the oval to be used as their preferred training ground and for a limited number of pre-season and exhibition matches.

Although Redfern Oval is no longer used as a venue for first grade rugby league it is still used as a home ground for Souths in the Jersey Flegg competition, the South Sydney Canterbury Cup team and the local Sydney combined competition.

== History ==
Redfern Park was designed and constructed during the 1880s as a Victorian pleasure ground with ornamental gardens, cricket pitches, bowling green and a bandstand. In 1903, legendary cricketer Victor Trumper played at the ground and reportedly hit a ball out of the field which went through the second-floor window of the boot factory across the road where a block of apartments now stand.

It was not until 1946 that South Sydney made a formal proposal to make Redfern Oval as their permanent home ground. As a result, Redfern Council added spectator seating and a hill at the oval for fans to watch the game.

== The Rabbitohs use of the oval ==
=== Premiership matches (1948–1987) ===
In 1948, the South Sydney Rabbitohs began playing at the ground, as part of their home-ground usage. The first match played at the ground was on 17 April 1948 against arch rivals Eastern Suburbs with the match finishing in a 19–19 draw. Souths played at Redfern until the end of 1987, where they move to the Sydney Football Stadium the following year.

In July 1987 Souths played Manly in front of a premiership record crowd of 23,257. The venue's all-time attendance record of 24,219 on 26 March 1967 in a Pre-season Cup double header featuring South Sydney vs St George and Balmain vs Manly-Warringah.

After 1987, Redfern was only used in the premiership as South Sydney's training ground. However, it did host the Charity Shield game between the Rabbitohs and St George in 1988, the last time the venue hosted the game between the clubs. Redfern also as hosted two games of the 1995 Tooheys Challenge Cup pre-season competition with a double header on 11 February. In the early game Cronulla defeated the Sydney Tigers 18–10, while the Rabbitohs marked their return to the ground with a 14–19 loss to a new team in the premiership, the Perth based Western Reds.

After a break of nine years, Redfern Oval returned as South Sydney's home ground for three games in the 1996 ARL season. Its return match saw the Gold Coast Chargers pip the Rabbitohs 18–16. South Sydney then won their final two premiership games at the ground, defeating the Western Reds 24–18, before accounting for the South Queensland Crushers 48–16 on 14 July 1996 in front of 3,107 fans.

In 2005, South Sydney had plans to return to Redfern Oval and redevelop the ground into a 20,000 seat stadium. The proposal was ultimately rejected by Sydney Council and Lord Mayor Clover Moore.

Moore claimed that George Piggins option would further reduce the average open space per person in the Redfern-Waterloo area below the current 5.9 square metres per person, which is already under the city average of 6.6. It was ultimately decided by Sydney City Council that Redfern would be converted into a 5000 seater training facility with the possibility of playing interstate NRL teams at the ground.

Piggins said of Moore's plan "This new plan is consistent with the latte set moving into Redfern. If you are catering for a NRL crowd of 8000, you will go out of business".

=== Souths Sydney move out ===
In January 2019, South Sydney announced a partnership with home builder, Metricon, to have naming rights to the Metricon High Performance Centre at Redfern Oval for two years. The ground was then known as the Ironmark High Performance Centre for a further two years.

After 75 years in Redfern, the club ceased training at the venue on 12 April 2023, when they moved to the Heffron Centre in Maroubra. A crowd of around 1,000 spectators attended the final session to farewell the ground, with club legends such as Mario Fenech, George Piggins, Bob McCarthy, Craig Coleman and Sam Burgess in attendance.

The club's junior representative, women's and reserves squads will continue to play at the ground.
