= Sydney Sports Ground =

Stadium & dirt track racing venue

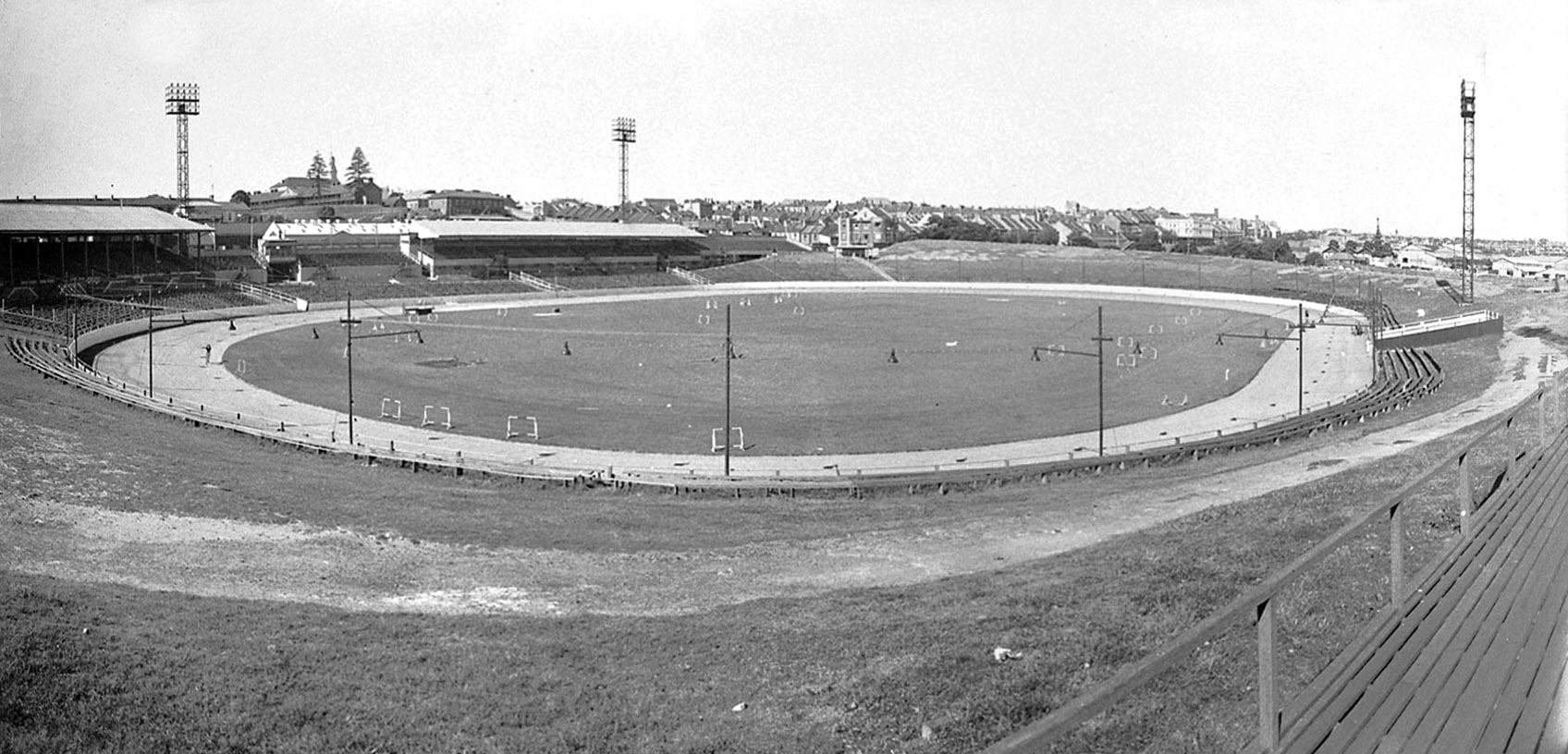
- Sydney Sports Ground in 1937
- Interactive map of Sydney Sports Ground
- Location: Moore Park, New South Wales, Australia
- Coordinates: 33°53′17″S 151°13′24″E
- Owner: N/A
- Operator: N/A
- Capacity: 35,000
- Surface: Grass

Construction
- Opened: 1911
- Closed: 1986
- Demolished: 1987
- Cost: N/A
- Architect: N/A

Tenants
- Former: Eastern Suburbs Roosters (1911-1986); South Sydney Rabbitohs (1911-1913, 1921-1924, 1928-1947)

The Sydney Sports Ground No. 1 was a stadium and dirt track racing venue in Sydney, New South Wales. The ground was located where the car park of the Sydney Football Stadium (SFS) currently sits. The ground had two main grandstands and was surrounded by a grass covered hill, giving it a capacity of more than 35,000. It was demolished along with the smaller No.2 Ground in 1986 to allow the building of the SFS, which opened in 1988. During its lifespan the sports ground hosted rugby league, rugby union, soccer, motorcycle speedway, and speedway car racing.

The Sports Ground was the home ground of NSWRL team, the Eastern Suburbs Roosters, the club playing 500 games at the ground from 1911 until 1986, with a 283-199-18 W-L-D record.

== History ==
The site was in the last half of the 19th century a military rifle range associated with Victoria Barracks. The land had in 1811 been part of the 'Sydney Common' dedication (now Centennial Parklands) granted to the city by NSW Governor Lachlan Macquarie. In 1899 the site was returned to the NSW government and the Sydney Sports Ground was opened in 1903.

=== Sport ===
The ground's primary use was as the home venue for Eastern Suburbs rugby league club, who began playing at the ground in Round 2 of the 1911 NSWRFL season with a 22–9 win over North Sydney on 6 May in front of 5,000 fans. The Roosters played their last game at the Sports Ground on 29 June 1986, defeating North Sydney 21–14 in front of 8,175 fans. The South Sydney Rabbitohs club also used it as a home ground intermittently from 1911 to 1947 before relocating to Redfern Oval. South Sydney played a total of 280 home matches at the venue between 1911-1985.

The Roosters recorded their biggest ever win at the Sydney Sports Ground on 18 May 1935, when they defeated Canterbury-Bankstown 87–7 in a Round 6 clash of the 1935 season. Easts ran in 19 tries to one with Australian test centre Dave Brown, the "Bradman of rugby league", scoring 45 points from 5 tries and 15 goals. Easts would win their 5th premiership in 1935 while Brown would go on to be the season's leading try scorer with 38 (still the league record for tries in a season as of 2017) and leading point scorer with 244 points (38 tries, 62 goals).

The Sydney Sports Ground also hosted the 1951 NSWRL Grand Final with South Sydney easily accounting for Manly-Warringah playing in their first ever grand final by a score of 42–14 in front of 28,505 fans, the smallest grand final crowd since 1944. The Sports Ground was used as the Sydney Cricket Ground was in use on that day.

Soccer and rugby league were among the sports held at the ground, but soccer teams also used the ground for major matches. It was also an important open-air boxing venue between the 1930s and 1960s. The champion Australian boxers Jack Carroll, Ron Richards and Jimmy Carruthers has memorable victories there.

The Sydney Sports Ground was one of the venues used in the 1938 British Empire Games. The ground also hosted six matches the 1981 FIFA World Youth Championship with a highest attendance of 28,932 for the double header with Argentina defeating Cameroon 1-0 and host nation Australia holding England to a 1-1 draw. The average attendance at the Sports Ground for the tournament was 17,270.

For many years the ground also hosted minor Rugby union representative matches and the annual Sydney rugby premiership grand final. Among some of the most memorable of these games were wins by the Sydney team over more fancied visitors such as Wales and Ireland, and a 13-all draw with the New Zealand All Blacks. Sydney's 18–16 win over Wales in 1978 featured one of the most famous field goals ever kicked in Australia when winger Laurie Monaghan's long range effort sailed over the crossbar in the dying minutes to seal a legendary victory. In 1906 a club match (now Shute Shield) between South Sydney and Eastern Suburbs clubs drew a crowd of 25,000 to the ground.

To raise money for Boys' Town - a Catholic home for troubled youths at Engadine, south of Sydney - the bookmaker George Nathan each Sunday organised a fund-raising carnival, with trotting, cycling and midget-car racing that packed the Sydney Sports Ground.

=== Speedway ===
From 1907 the Sydney Sports Ground was used as a Motorcycle racing track. The track that was later to become the dirt speedway was then concrete. The concrete was removed in the 1920s and replaced by a ¼ Mile, 382 metres (418 yards) dirt track, and starting on 30 October 1937 the Sports Ground was a Dirt track racing Speedway venue hosting Solos, Sidecars and Speedcars. The Sydney Sports Ground Speedway was officially opened in 1937 by Mr E. A. Buttershaw, NSW Minister for Lands.

The ground held the first ever Australian Speedcar Grand Prix on 12 March 1938 and was won by Sydney driver Les Dillon who was killed at the track only two months later becoming the speedway's first fatality. Between 1938 and 1953, eight Solo riders and four Speedcar drivers died as a result of accidents on the dirt track. The Sports Ground held its last speedway meeting on 25 March 1955.

England's Speedway Star of the 1930s through to the early 1950s Jack Parker, stated that the Sports Ground track was "The best Speedway track in the World" after one of his visits to Australia to captain England in numerous test matches at the ground against the Australians who often had among their ranks Speedway World Champions Lionel Van Praag, Bluey Wilkinson, and later Jack Young.

During its 18 years of operation, the Sports Ground Speedway also played host on occasion to the Australian Solo Championship, Australian Sidecar Championship, Australian Speedcar Championship, NSW Solo Championship, NSW Sidecar Championship and the NSW Speedcar Championship.

On 19 June 2004 a plaque was unveiled on the site of the former Sports Ground. It reads:

SYDNEY SPORTS GROUND SPEEDWAY

Motorcycle Racing on the original concrete track located on this site was first held in 1907 when the arena was known as the Sydney Sports Ground. The track was removed in the mid 1920s and replaced in 1937 by a quarter-mile dirt track. Racing for Solo and Sidecar motorcycles and Speedcars continued to the mid 1950s and the Sydney Sports Ground was world famous as the venue for Australian Championships for all speedway divisions and motorcycle test matches between Australia and England.

World Solo Motorcycle Champions to compete here included Lionel Van Praag, Jack Milne, Arthur "Bluey" Wilkinson and Jack Young. Sidecar champions included Jim Davies, Jack Carruthers, Keith Ratten and Charles "Chook" Hodgekiss and among the many famous Speedcar drivers were Australia's Ray Ravell, Jack Brabham and Bill Reynolds, and Americans Paul Swedeberg, Beale Simmons and Frank "Satan" Brewer. This plaque commemorates one of Australia's most important dirt track speedways and the memory of the 12 riders and drivers who lost their lives here.

This plaque was unveiled on the 19th of June 2004 on behalf of the Veteran Speedway Riders Association of Australia and the Vintage Speedcar Association of NSW by former competitors Tommy Bradshaw, Peter Speerin and Jim Courtney.

==== Fatalities ====
In an era when death was an accepted risk of the sport, 12 competitors lost their lives while racing at the Sydney Sports Ground. In the most tragic accident, close friends off the track Norm Clay and Ray Duggan both died after crashing together in a Solo race there on 21 January 1950.

The 12 Speedway competitors who lost their lives at the Sports Ground are

- Les Dillon - Speedcar (22 May 1938)
- Claude Miller - Speedcar (25 April 1939)
- Len Behrmann - Solo (1945)
- Jack Daly - Speedcar (5 January 1946)
- Bob Hibbert - Solo (10 May 1946)
- Norm Gillespie - Solo (2 April 1948)
- Jack Sharpe (John Sharpe Gibson) - Solo (22 October 1948)
- Norm Clay - Solo (21 January 1950)
- Ray Duggan - Solo (21 January 1950)
- Ken Le Breton - Solo (5 January 1951)
- Bill Annabel - Speedcar (23 October 1953)
- Noel Watson - Solo (6 November 1953)

==== Track records in 1952 ====
- Solo (1 lap rolling start): 0:16.2 - Lionel Levy ( (Australia) )
- Solo (1 lap clutch start): 0:18.2 - Lionel Levy ( (Australia) )
- Sidecar (2 laps flying start): 37- 1/5 secs - Jack Carruthers ( (Australia) )
- Sidecar (2 laps clutch start): 39- 1/5 secs - Jim Davies ( (Australia) )
- Speedcar (1 lap rolling start): 16- 4/5 secs - Frank Brewer ( (New Zealand) / (United States) )
- Speedcar (2 laps rolling start): 33- 3/5 secs - Ray Revell ( (Australia) )
- Speedcar (50 laps rolling start): 16:49.0 - Beale Simmons ( (United States) )
