= 1955 NSWRFL season =

Rugby league competition

1955 New South Wales Rugby Football League
- Teams: 10
- Premiers: South Sydney (16th title)
- Minor premiers: Newtown (6th title)
- Matches played: 94
- Points scored: 3253
- Top points scorer(s): Doug Fleming (185)
- Wooden spoon: Western Suburbs (10th spoon)
- Top try-scorer(s): Brian Allsop (18); Ian Moir (18)

The 1955 NSWRFL season was the 48th season of the New South Wales Rugby Football League. Ten teams from across Sydney competed for the NSWRFL Premiership J. J. Giltinan Shield during the season, which culminated in a replay of the previous year's Grand Final between the South Sydney and Newtown clubs.

== Season summary ==
Halfway through the 1955 season Souths were in equal 9th place having won just three of ten matches. From that point they didn't lose another game, winning eight season encounters in a row before the finals. Eventually they finished 4th. Had they lost a single one of these games they would have missed the finals.

In the second last match of the regular season Souths met Manly-Warringah and were behind 4–7 with moments to go. Clive Churchill had broken his arm early in the game tackling Manly winger George Hugo but refused to leave the field. Souths lock Les Cowie managed to score a try in the corner and Churchill with a broken arm took a sideline conversion attempt that wobbled over the posts and won Souths the game. Churchill would take no part in Souths' 1955 finals campaign.

=== Teams ===
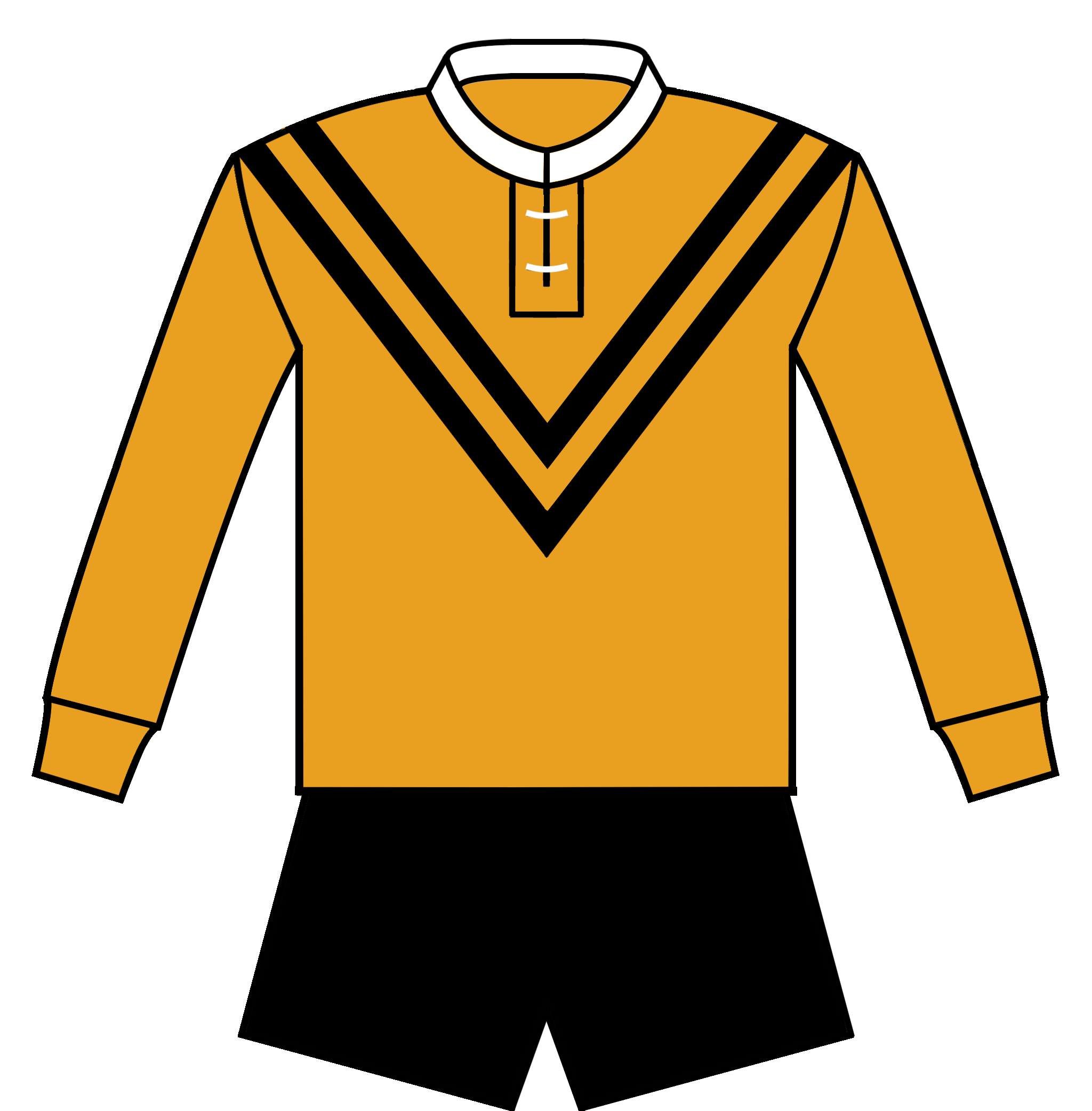
Balmain 48th season Ground: Leichhardt Oval; Coach: Norm "Latchem" Robinson; Captain: Bill Marsh

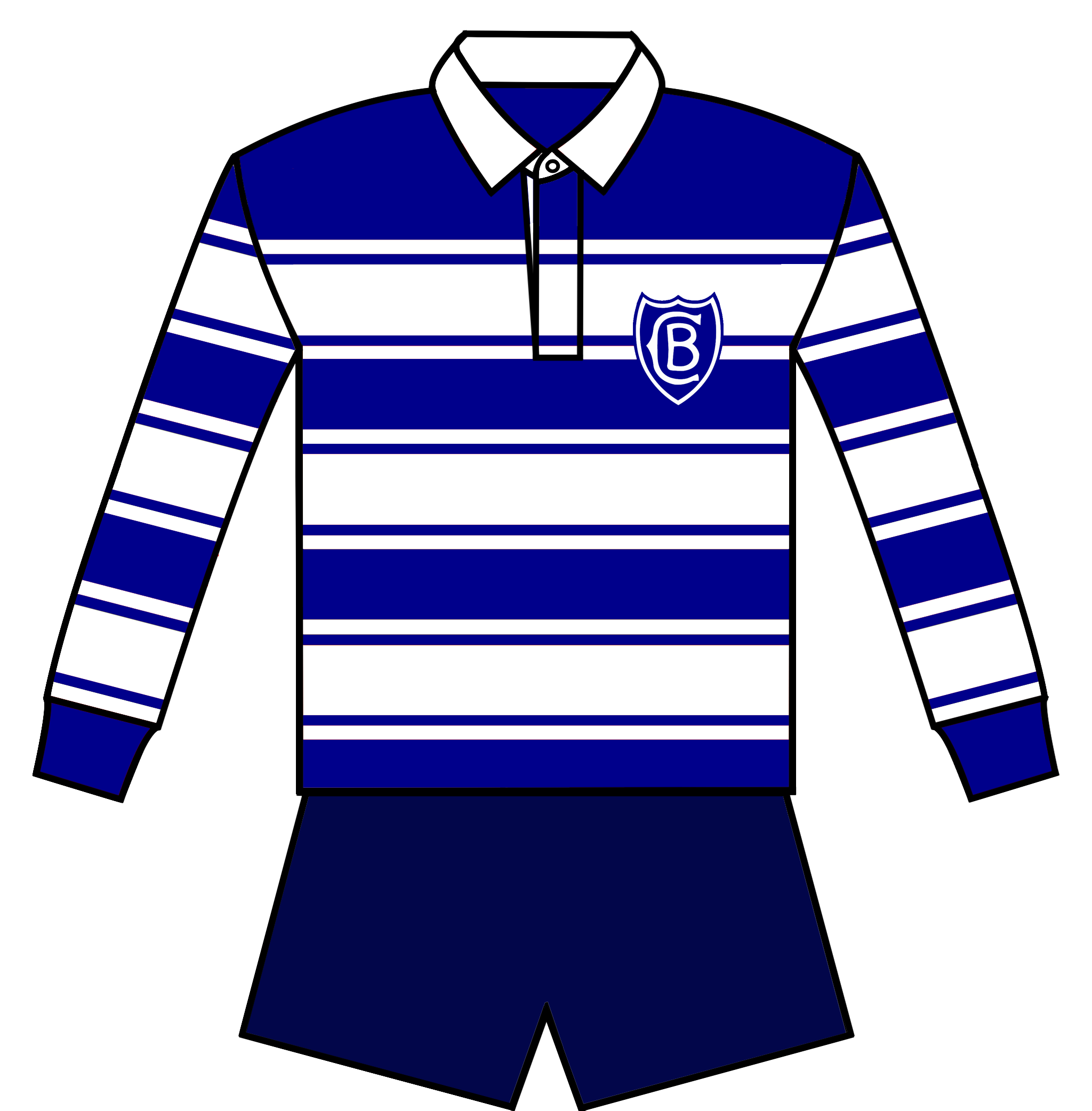
Canterbury-Bankstown 21st season Ground: Belmore Sports Ground; Coach: Vic Hey; Captain: Ray Gartner

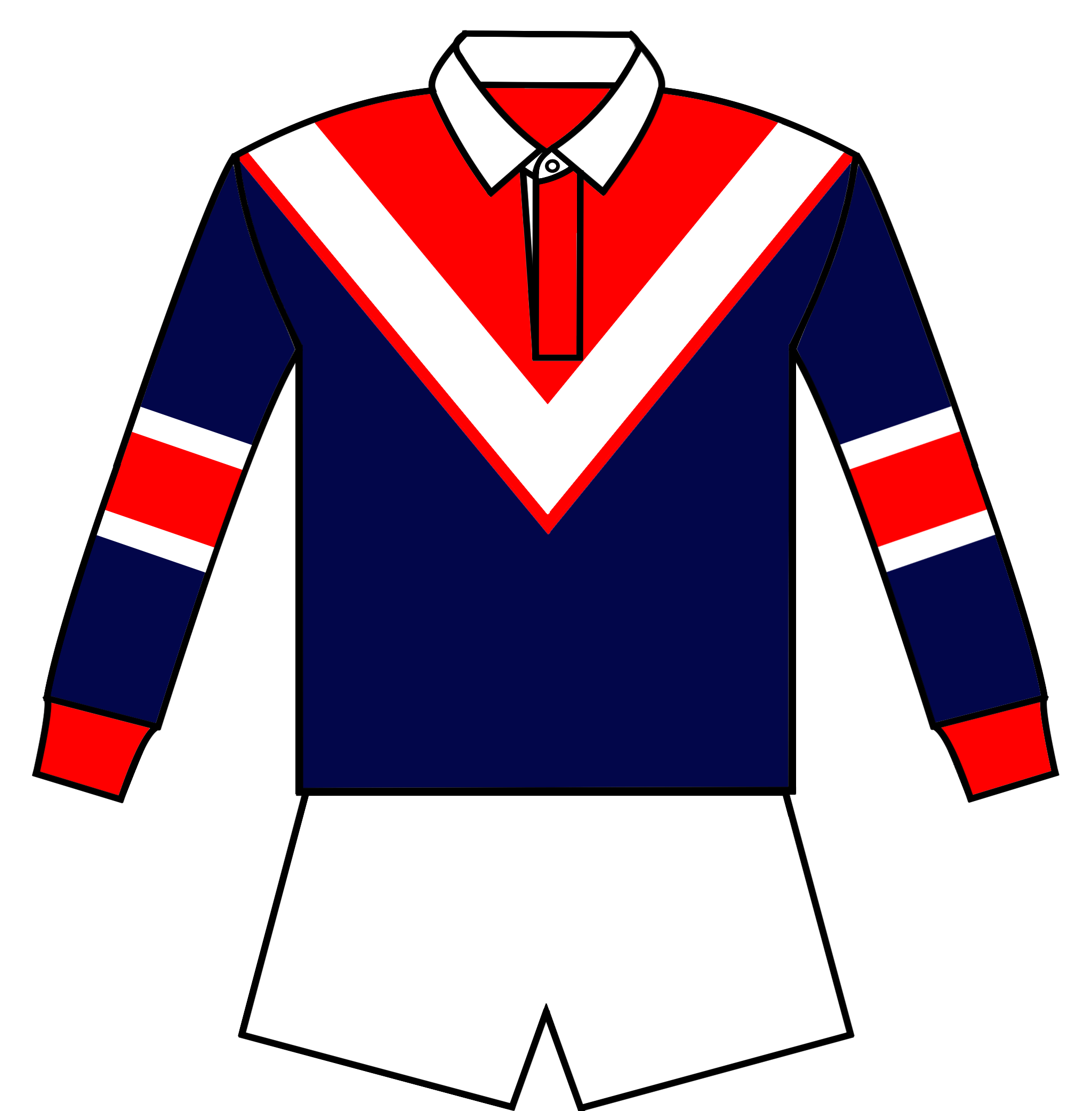
Eastern Suburbs 48th season Ground: Sydney Sports Ground; Coach: Frank O'Connor; Captain: Noel Pidding

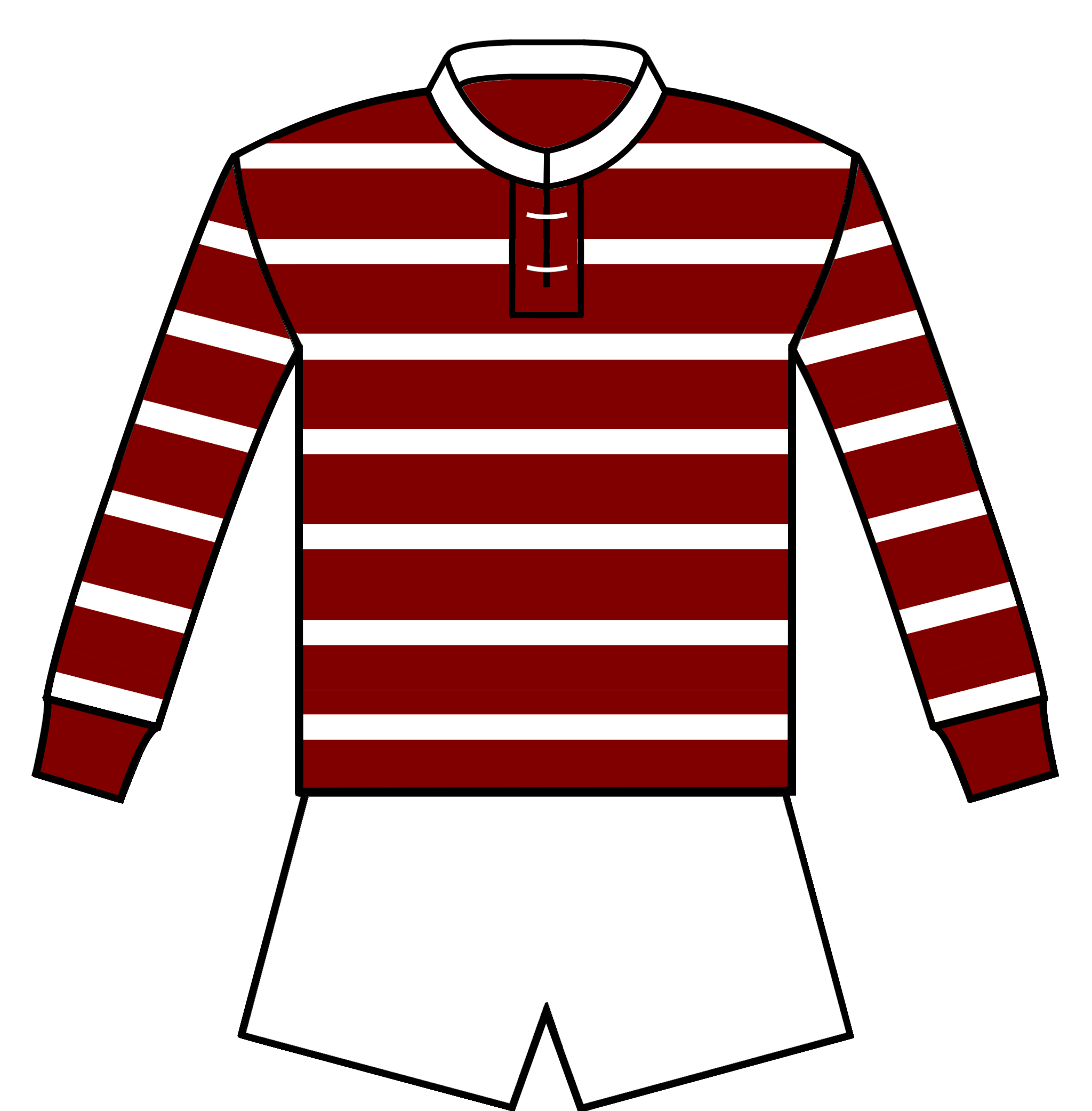
Manly-Warringah 9th season Ground: Brookvale Oval; Coach: Pat Devery; Captain: Roy Bull

Newtown 48th season Ground: Henson Park; Captain-Coach: Dick Poole

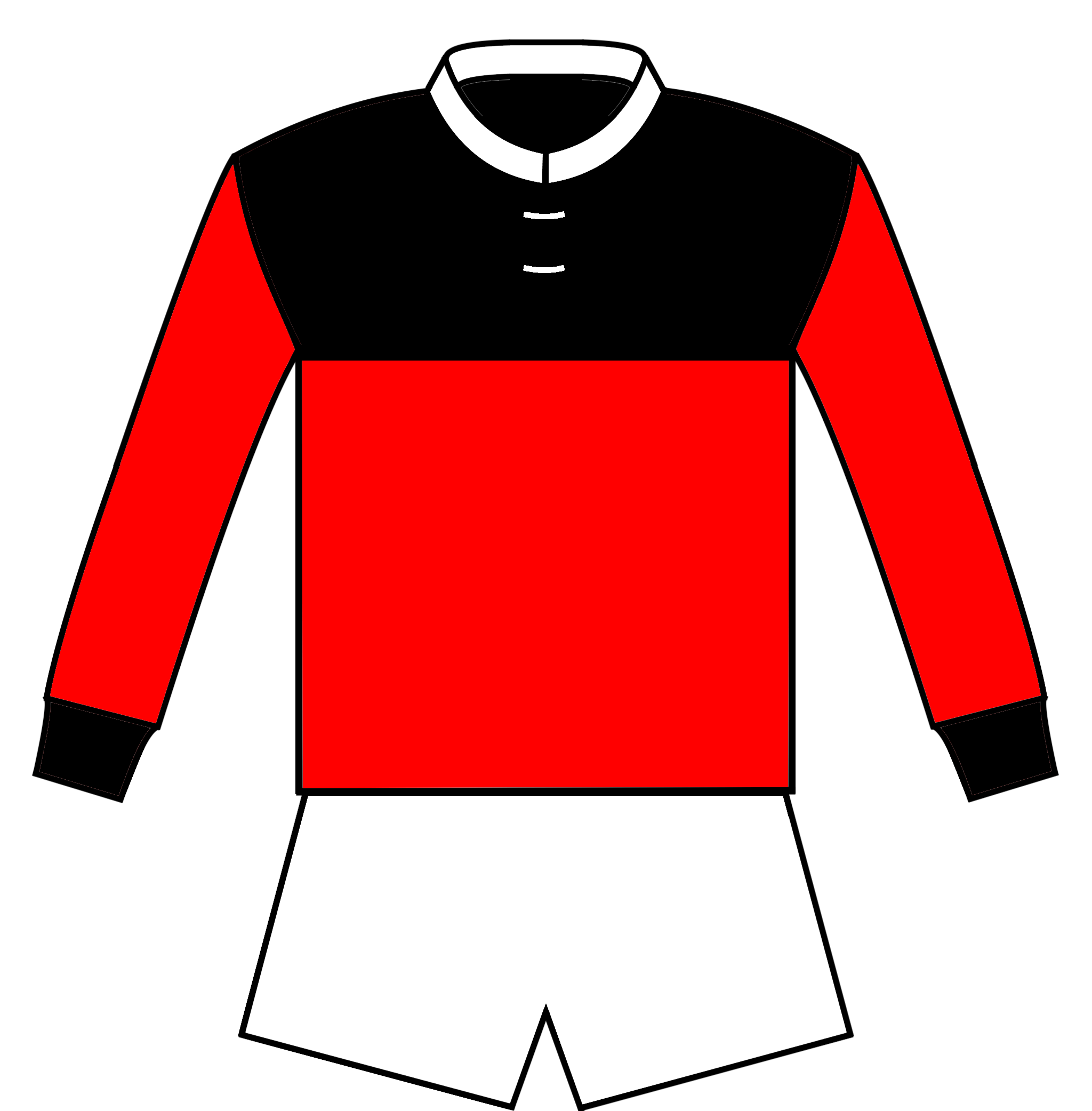
North Sydney 48th season Ground: North Sydney Oval; Coach: Rex Harrison; Captain: George Martin

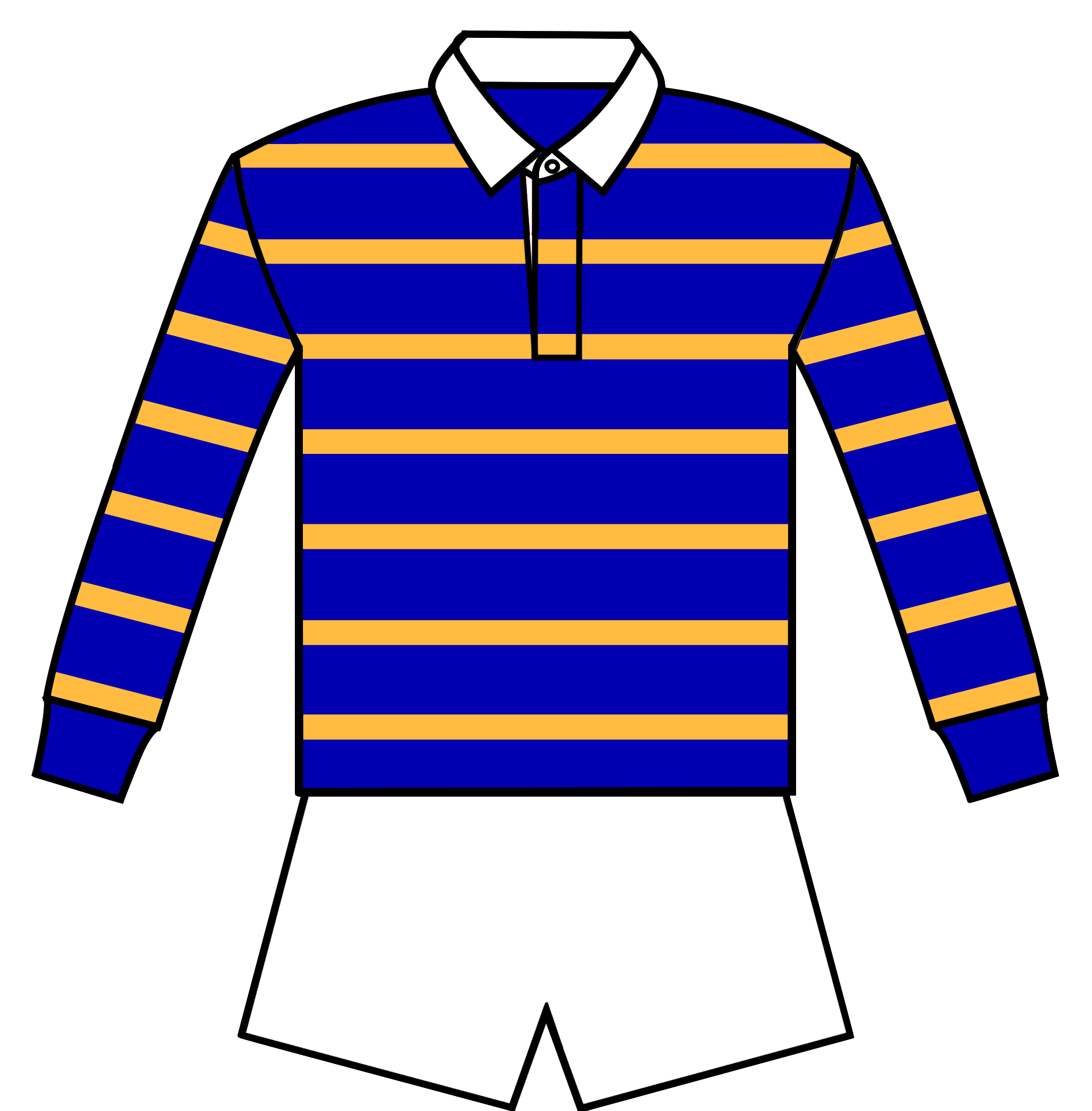
Parramatta 9th season Ground: Cumberland Oval; Captain-Coach: Johnny Slade

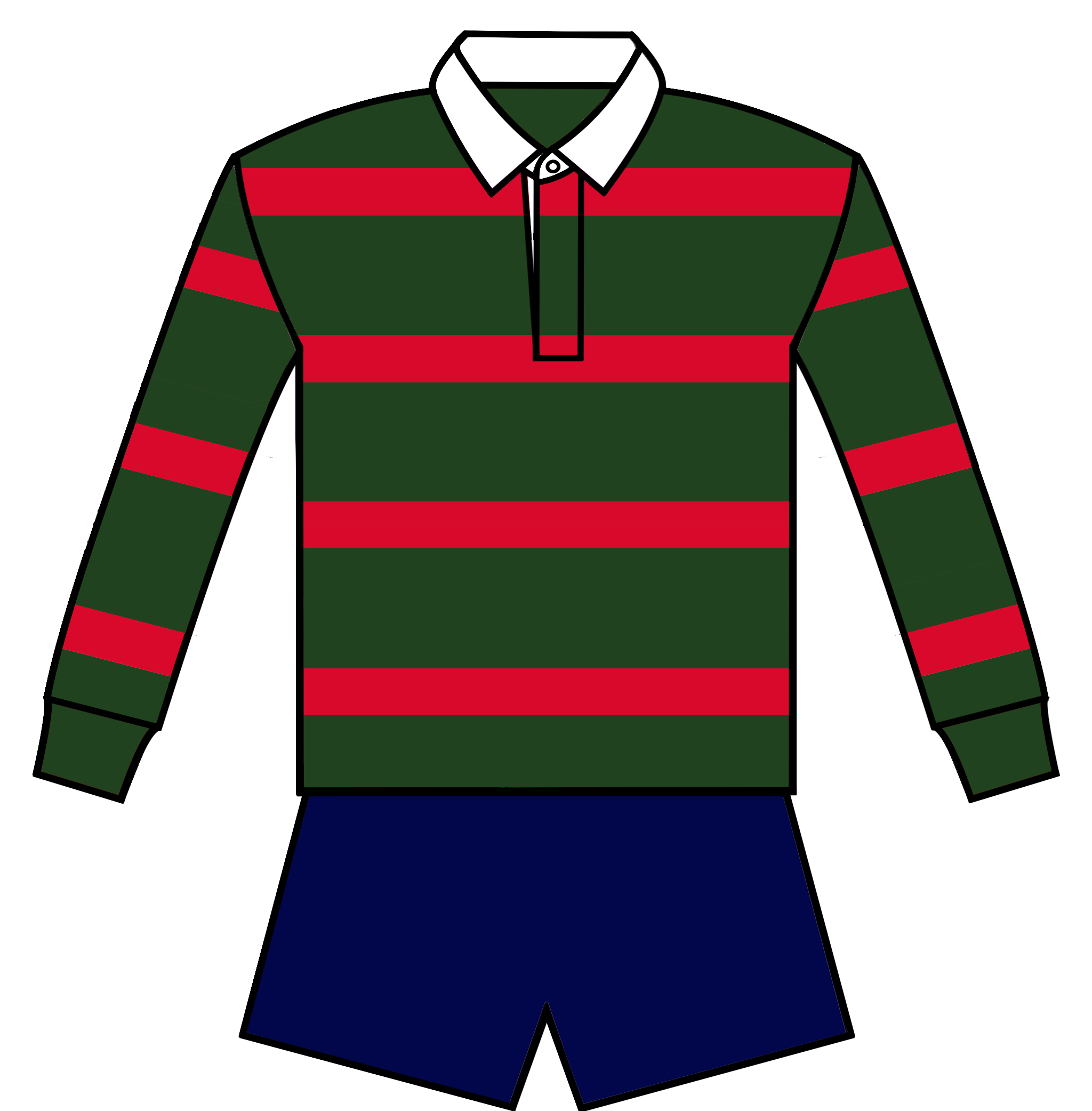
South Sydney 48th season Ground: Redfern Oval; Captain-Coach: Jack Rayner

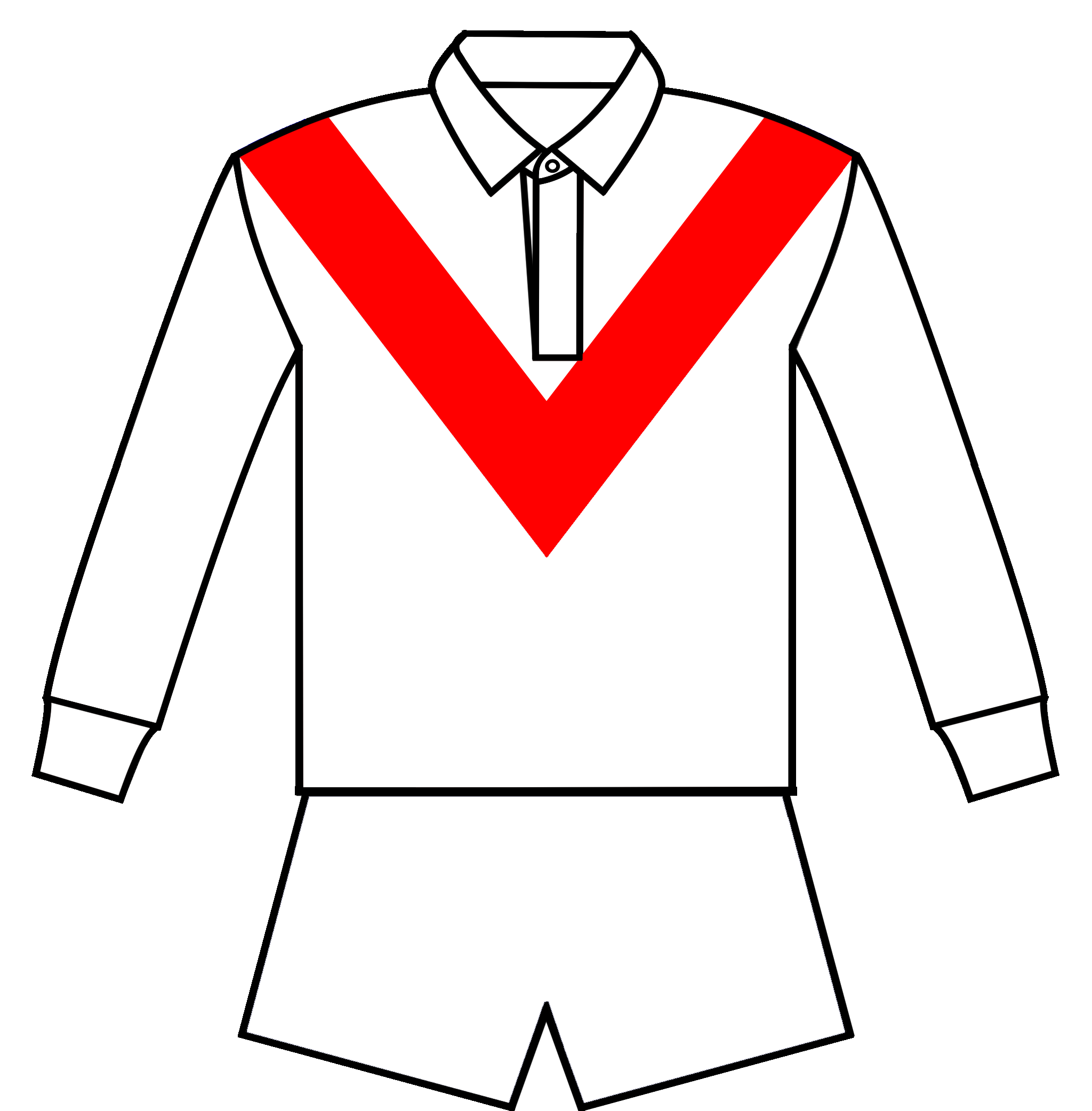
St. George 35th season Ground: Kogarah Oval; Captain-Coach: Ken Kearney

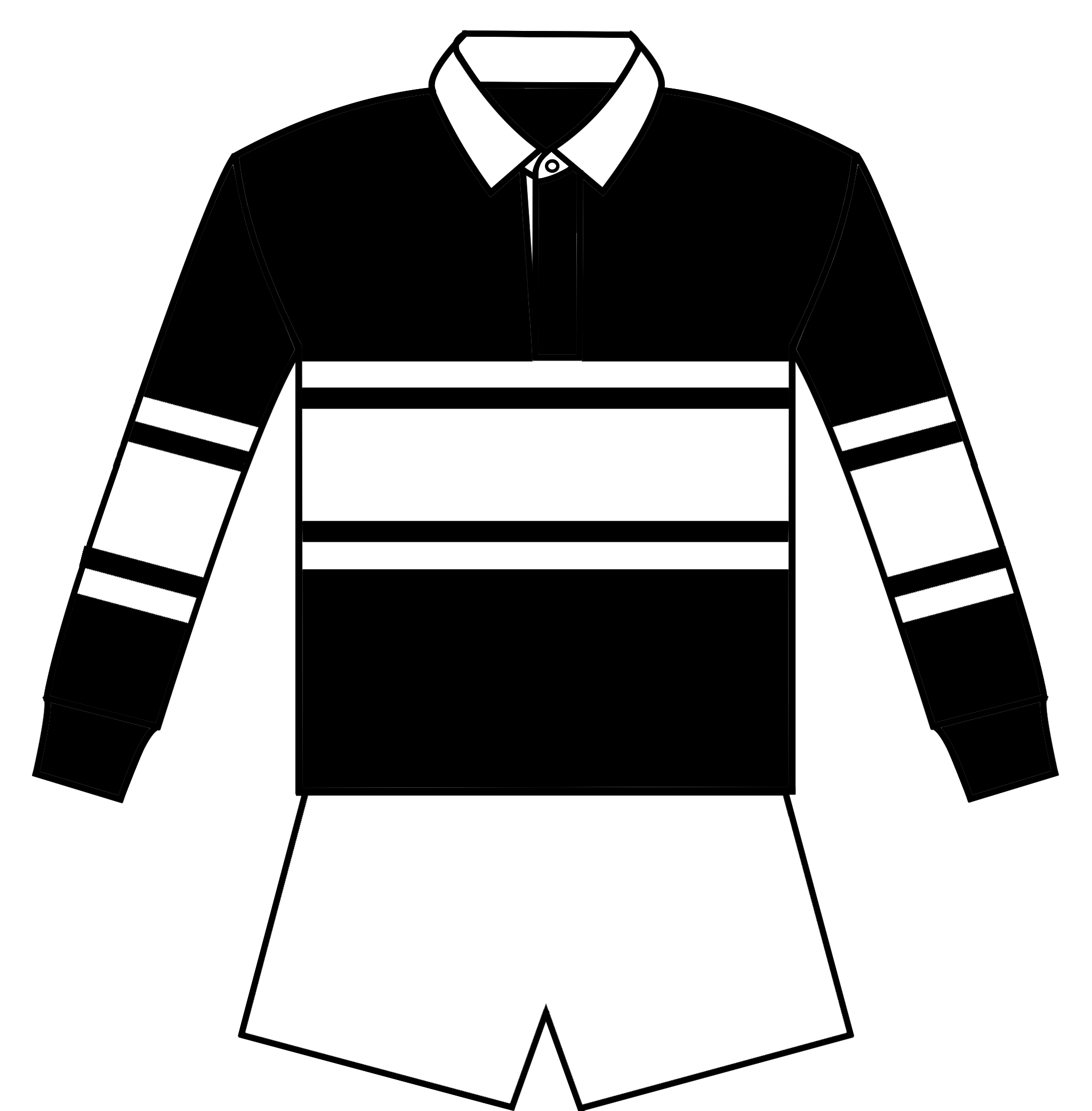
Western Suburbs 48th season Ground: Pratten Park; Captain-Coach: Keith Holman

== Regular season ==
Team	1	2	3	4	5	6	7	8	9	10	11	12	13	14	15	16	17	18	F1	F2	F3	GF
Balmain	**MAN** **+2**	NEW +4	SOU −18	PAR −12	**WES** **+22**	**STG** **−3**	**NOR** **−4**	**CBY** **+6**	EAS −4	MAN; 0	**NEW** **+4**	**SOU** **−8**	**PAR** **+16**	**WES** **+13**	STG −2	NOR −13	CBY +4	**EAS** **+8**				
Canterbury-Bankstown	WES −9	**STG** **−17**	**NOR** **+2**	SOU −25	**EAS** **−3**	MAN −17	NEW −25	BAL +6	**PAR** **+5**	**WES** **+3**	STG −18	NOR −28	**SOU** **−34**	EAS −34	**MAN** **−26**	**NEW** **−10**	**BAL** **−4**	PAR −13				
Eastern Suburbs	PAR +19	**WES** **−13**	**STG** **−4**	NOR −19	CBY +3	**SOU** **+3**	**MAN** **−7**	**NEW**; **0**	**BAL** **+4**	**PAR** **+26**	WES +18	**STG** **−7**	**NOR** **−4**	**CBY** **+34**	SOU −11	**MAN** **+1**	NEW −18	BAL −8				
Manly-Warringah	BAL −2	PAR +6	WES +46	STG −18	NOR +4	**CBY** **+17**	EAS +7	**SOU** **+12**	NEW −44	**BAL**; **0**	**PAR** **−2**	**WES** **+26**	STG +3	**NOR** **+2**	CBY +26	EAS −1	SOU −2	**NEW** **+7**	**SOU** **−2**			
Newtown	**SOU** **+23**	**BAL** **−4**	**PAR** **+3**	WES +17	**STG** **+6**	NOR +10	**CBY** **+25**	EAS; 0	**MAN** **+44**	SOU +1	BAL −4	PAR +17	**WES** **+26**	**STG** **+5**	**NOR** **+7**	CBY +10	**EAS** **+18**	MAN −7	X	**STG** **+3**	X	**SOU** **−1**
North Sydney	STG −10	**SOU** **+8**	CBY −2	**EAS** **+19**	**MAN** **−4**	**NEW** **−10**	BAL +4	PAR +7	**WES** **+22**	**STG** **−11**	SOU −15	**CBY** **+28**	EAS +4	MAN −2	NEW −7	**BAL** **+13**	**PAR** **+1**	WES +22				
Parramatta	**EAS** **−19**	**MAN** **−6**	NEW −3	**BAL** **+12**	SOU +9	**WES** **−4**	**STG** **−8**	**NOR** **−7**	CBY −5	EAS −26	MAN +2	**NEW** **−17**	BAL −16	**SOU** **−22**	WES +20	STG −29	NOR −1	**CBY** **+13**				
South Sydney	NEW −23	NOR −8	**BAL** **+18**	**CBY** **+25**	**PAR** **−9**	EAS −3	**WES** **+25**	MAN −12	STG −18	**NEW** **−1**	**NOR** **+15**	BAL +8	CBY +34	PAR +22	**EAS** **+11**	WES +11	**MAN** **+2**	**STG** **+10**	MAN +2	X	STG +4	NEW +1
St. George	**NOR** **+10**	CBY +17	EAS +4	**MAN** **+18**	NEW −6	BAL +3	PAR +8	WES +13	**SOU** **+18**	NOR +11	**CBY** **+18**	EAS +7	**MAN** **−3**	NEW −5	**BAL** **+2**	**PAR** **+29**	**WES** **+15**	SOU −10	X	NEW −3	**SOU** **−4**	
Western Suburbs	**CBY** **+9**	EAS +13	**MAN** **−46**	**NEW** **−17**	BAL −22	PAR +4	SOU −25	**STG** **−13**	NOR −22	CBY −3	**EAS** **−18**	MAN −26	NEW −26	BAL −13	**PAR** **−20**	**SOU** **−11**	STG −15	**NOR** **−22**				
Team	1	2	3	4	5	6	7	8	9	10	11	12	13	14	15	16	17	18	F1	F2	F3	GF

Bold – Home game
X – Bye
Opponent for round listed above margin

=== Ladder ===
	Team	Pld	W	D	L	PF	PA	PD	Pts
1	Newtown	18	14	1	3	376	179	+197	29
2	St. George	18	14	0	4	396	247	+149	28
3	Manly	18	11	1	6	332	245	+87	23
4	South Sydney	18	11	0	7	367	260	+107	22
5	North Sydney	18	10	0	8	345	278	+67	20
6	Eastern Suburbs	18	8	1	9	342	325	+17	17
7	Balmain	18	8	1	9	384	381	+3	17
8	Parramatta	18	5	0	13	258	365	-107	10
9	Canterbury	18	4	0	14	167	414	-247	8
10	Western Suburbs	18	3	0	15	186	459	-273	6

=== Ladder progression ===
- Numbers highlighted in green indicate that the team finished the round inside the top 4.
- Numbers highlighted in blue indicates the team finished first on the ladder in that round.
- Numbers highlighted in red indicates the team finished last place on the ladder in that round.

	Team	1	2	3	4	5	6	7	8	9	10	11	12	13	14	15	16	17	18
1	Newtown	2	2	4	6	8	10	12	13	15	17	17	19	21	23	25	27	29	29
2	St. George	2	4	6	8	8	10	12	14	16	18	20	22	22	22	24	26	28	28
3	Manly-Warringah	0	2	4	4	6	8	10	12	12	13	13	15	17	19	21	21	21	23
4	South Sydney	0	0	2	4	4	4	6	6	6	6	8	10	12	14	16	18	20	22
5	North Sydney	0	2	2	4	4	4	6	8	10	10	10	12	14	14	14	16	18	20
6	Eastern Suburbs	2	2	2	2	4	6	6	7	9	11	13	13	13	15	15	17	17	17
7	Balmain	2	4	4	4	6	6	6	6	6	7	9	9	11	13	13	13	15	17
8	Parramatta	0	0	0	2	4	4	4	4	4	4	6	6	6	6	8	8	8	10
9	Canterbury-Bankstown	0	0	2	2	2	2	2	4	6	8	8	8	8	8	8	8	8	8
10	Western Suburbs	2	4	4	4	4	6	6	6	6	6	6	6	6	6	6	6	6	6

== Finals ==
Home	Score	Away	Match Information
Home	Score	Away	Date and Time	Venue	Referee	Crowd
Semifinals
Manly-Warringah	12–14	South Sydney	27 August 1955	Sydney Cricket Ground	Darcy Lawler	35,677
Newtown	11–8	St. George	3 September 1955	Sydney Cricket Ground	Darcy Lawler	34,158
Preliminary Final
St. George	14–18	South Sydney	10 September 1955	Sydney Cricket Ground	Col Pearce	41,583
Grand Final
Newtown	11–12	South Sydney	17 September 1955	Sydney Cricket Ground	Col Pearce	42,466

=== Grand Final ===
Newtown	Position	South Sydney
13. Gordon Clifford	FB	15. Don Murdoch
12. Kevin Considine	WG	12. Ian Moir
10. Dick Poole (Ca./Co.)	CE	11. Martin Gallagher
9. Brian Clay	CE	18. Malcolm Spencer
11. Ray Preston	WG	29. Dale Puren
8. Ray Kelly	FE	14. John Dougherty
7. Bobby Whitton	HB	8. Col Donohoe
2. Don Stait	PR	1. Denis Donoghue
27. Greg Ellis	HK	2. Ernie Hammerton
3. Les Hampson	PR	25. Norm Nilson
4. Henry Holloway	SR	4. Jack Rayner (Ca./Co.)
5. Frank Narvo	SR	5. Bernie Purcell
6. Peter Ryan	LK	6. Les Cowie

After their incredible eight game end-of-season run and having come from behind in both their semi-finals it looked unlikely that Souths’ fairytale would end happily on Grand Final day. They were without stars Clive Churchill and Greg Hawick. Newtown were the minor premiers and had eleven of their 1954 Grand Final side back for the 1955 decider, all fit, experienced and keen to avenge their 1954 loss.

The 1955 Grand Final was very closely fought out. Souths trailed 4–8 at half-time and the Bluebags looked home with an 11–7 lead with ten minutes remaining. In the final moments captain-coach Jack Rayner managed to win a strike in the play-the-ball and toed it through. Newtown lock Peter Ryan fumbled and again Rayner got the boot to it. Souths halfback Col Donohoe won the race and grounded the ball next to the posts, enabling an easy conversion by Bernie Purcell for the Rabbitohs to take a one-point lead.

A last gasp long-range penalty goal attempt from Bluebags fullback Gordon Clifford was unsuccessful (it passed between the posts but fractionally under the crossbar) and Souths won by a single point. Despite being the best performed side for two successive seasons Newtown had nothing in the trophy cabinet to show for it. Souths had timed an extraordinary premiership run to absolute perfection.

Jack Rayner's fifth grand final win that day stands along with Ken Kearney's five wins by 1960 as the most number of grand final successes by an individual as captain. As captain-coach for all of those wins Rayner was thus also the first man to coach a side to five grand final victories, a record subsequently matched by Jack Gibson and beaten in 2006 by Wayne Bennett.

South Sydney 12 Tries: Moir, Donohoe. Goals: Purcell 3.

Newtown 11 Try: Considine. Goals: Clifford 3. Field Goal: Clifford

== Player statistics ==
The following statistics are as of the conclusion of Round 18.

Top 5 point scorers

Points	Player	Tries	Goals	Field Goals
177	Doug Fleming	1	87	0
168	Gordon Clifford	0	84	0
140	Angus Kellock	0	70	0
133	Alan Arkey	1	64	1
123	Keith Barnes	1	60	0

Top 5 try scorers

Tries	Player
18	Brian Allsop
16	Ian Moir
16	Dick Poole
15	Kevin Considine
13	Kevin O'Brien
13	Johnny Tenison

Top 5 goal scorers

Goals	Player
87	Doug Fleming
84	Gordon Clifford
70	Angus Kellock
64	Alan Arkey
60	Keith Barnes
