= 1954 NSWRFL season =

Rugby league competition

1954 New South Wales Rugby Football League
- Teams: 10
- Premiers: South Sydney (15th title)
- Minor premiers: Newtown (5th title)
- Matches played: 94
- Points scored: 3613
- Top points scorer: Ron Rowles (221)
- Wooden spoon: Parramatta (3rd spoon)
- Top try-scorer: Ray Preston (34)

The 1954 NSWRFL season was the forty-seventh season of the New South Wales Rugby Football League premiership competition, based in Sydney. Ten rugby league football teams from across the city competed for the J. J. Giltinan Shield during the season, which culminated in the first "mandatory" grand final, played between South Sydney and Newtown.

== Season summary ==
During the pre-season, Queensland and Australian international representative forward, Harold "Mick" Crocker signed a then record one-year deal for an Australian to move south and play for Sydney club Parramatta.

1954 marked the first season when a Grand Final was scheduled to determine the premiership winner. Prior to that the season victors were either the minor premiers or decided by a final that followed two semi-finals. A Grand Final was only played if the minor-premier was defeated in a semi-final or final and exercised their right to challenge via a Grand Final. The scheduled Grand Final was a response to the fiasco of the 1951 season finale, when the NSWRFL had been unable to obtain use of any of the Moore Park grounds (Note: The Sydney Cricket Ground, Sydney Showground and Sydney Sports Ground) on the Saturday when a Grand Final would have been played, and had to play on a Sunday.

Since this season a Grand Final has been played every year to determine the premiership winner.

In a New South Wales versus England match at the Sydney Cricket Ground, referee Aub Oxford watched in disbelief the players fighting around him like street-brawlers before turning his back and walking from the field. Oxford never refereed again and the match remains the only top-level game ever abandoned in rugby league history.

=== Teams ===
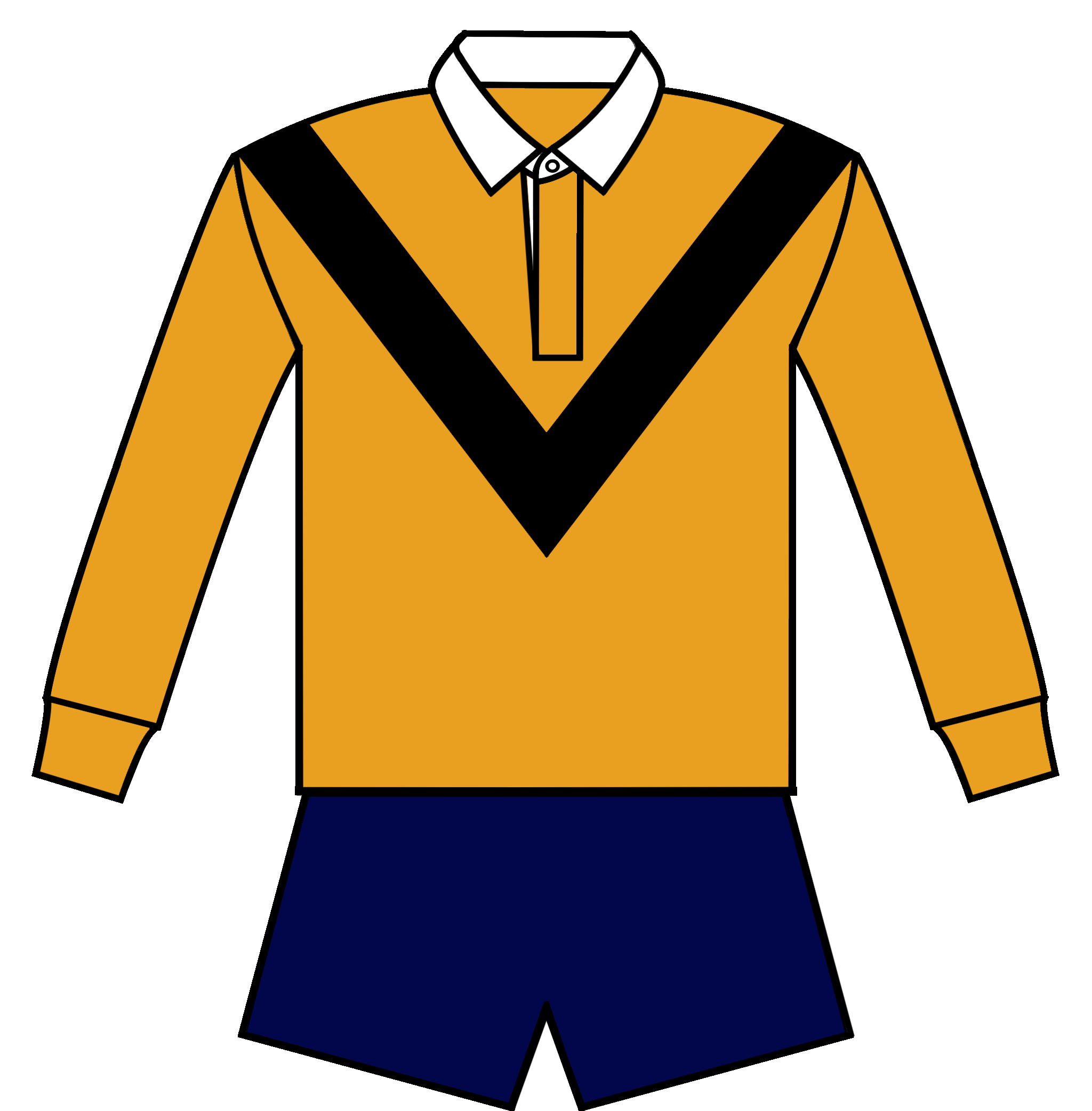
Balmain 47th season Ground: Leichhardt Oval; Coach: Norm Robinson; Captain: Jack Fifield

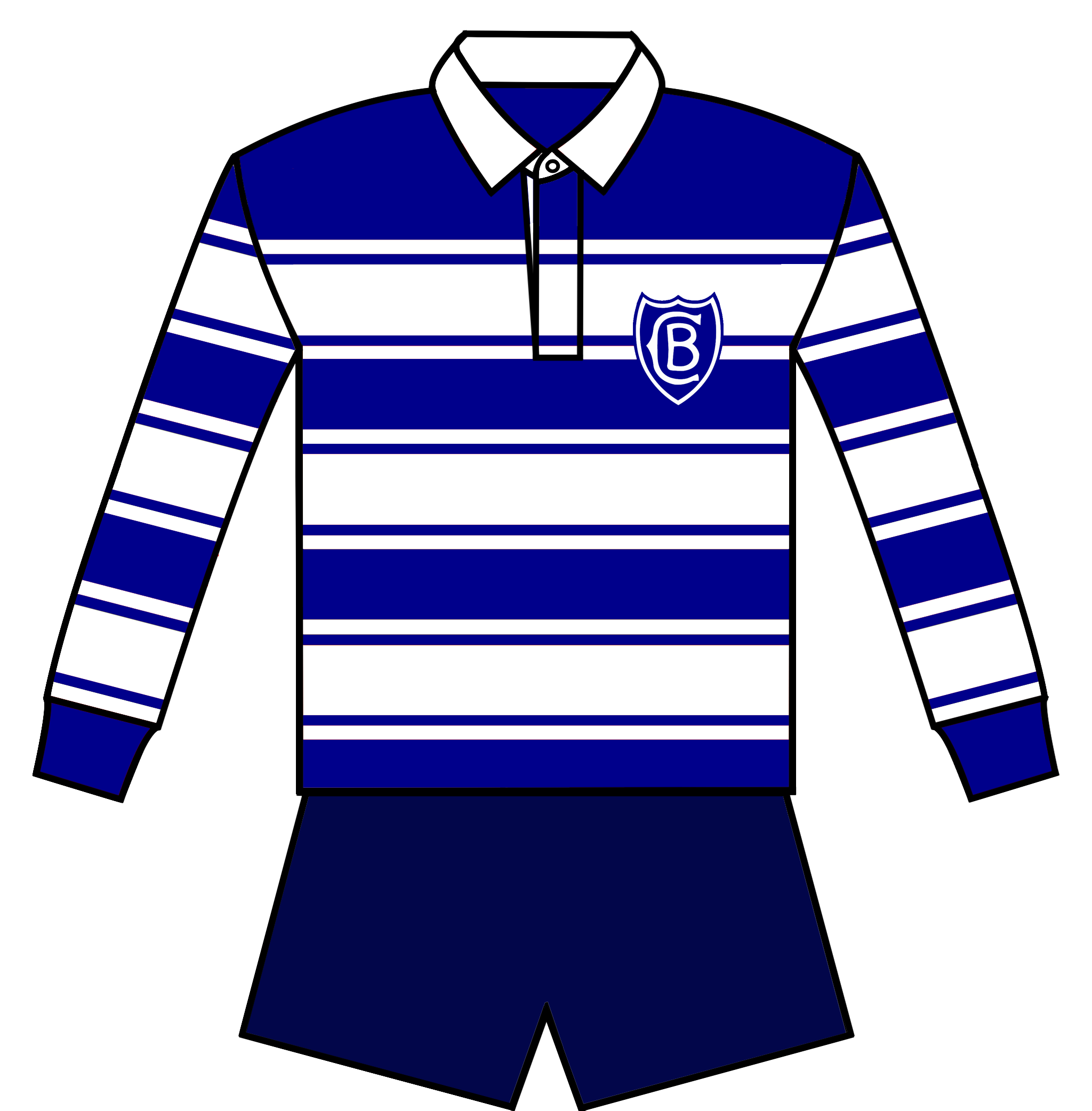
Canterbury-Bankstown 20th season Ground: Belmore Sports Ground; Coach: Jack Hampstead; Captain: Leo Trevena

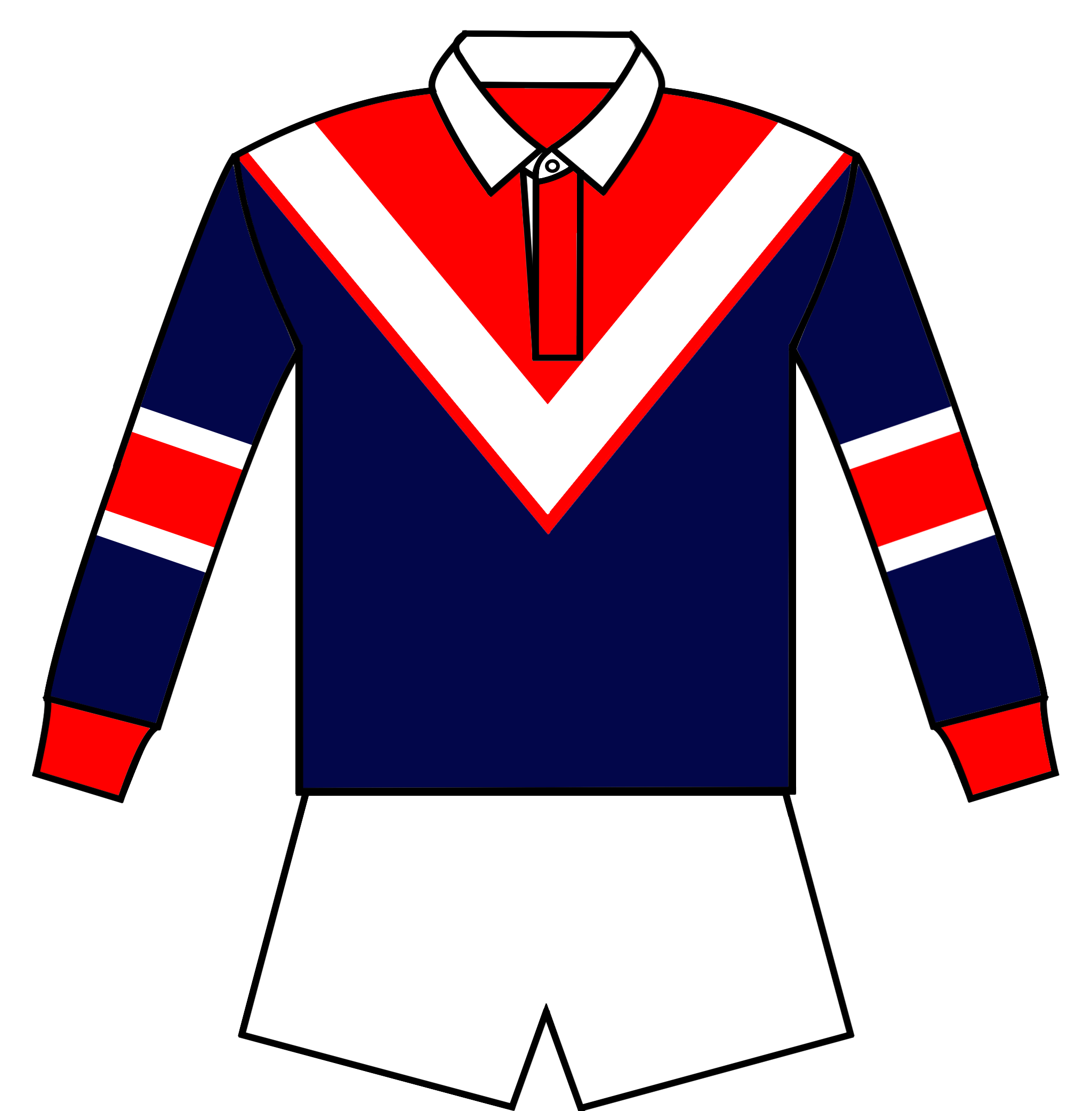
Eastern Suburbs 47th season Ground: Sydney Sports Ground; Captain-Coach: Ferris Ashton

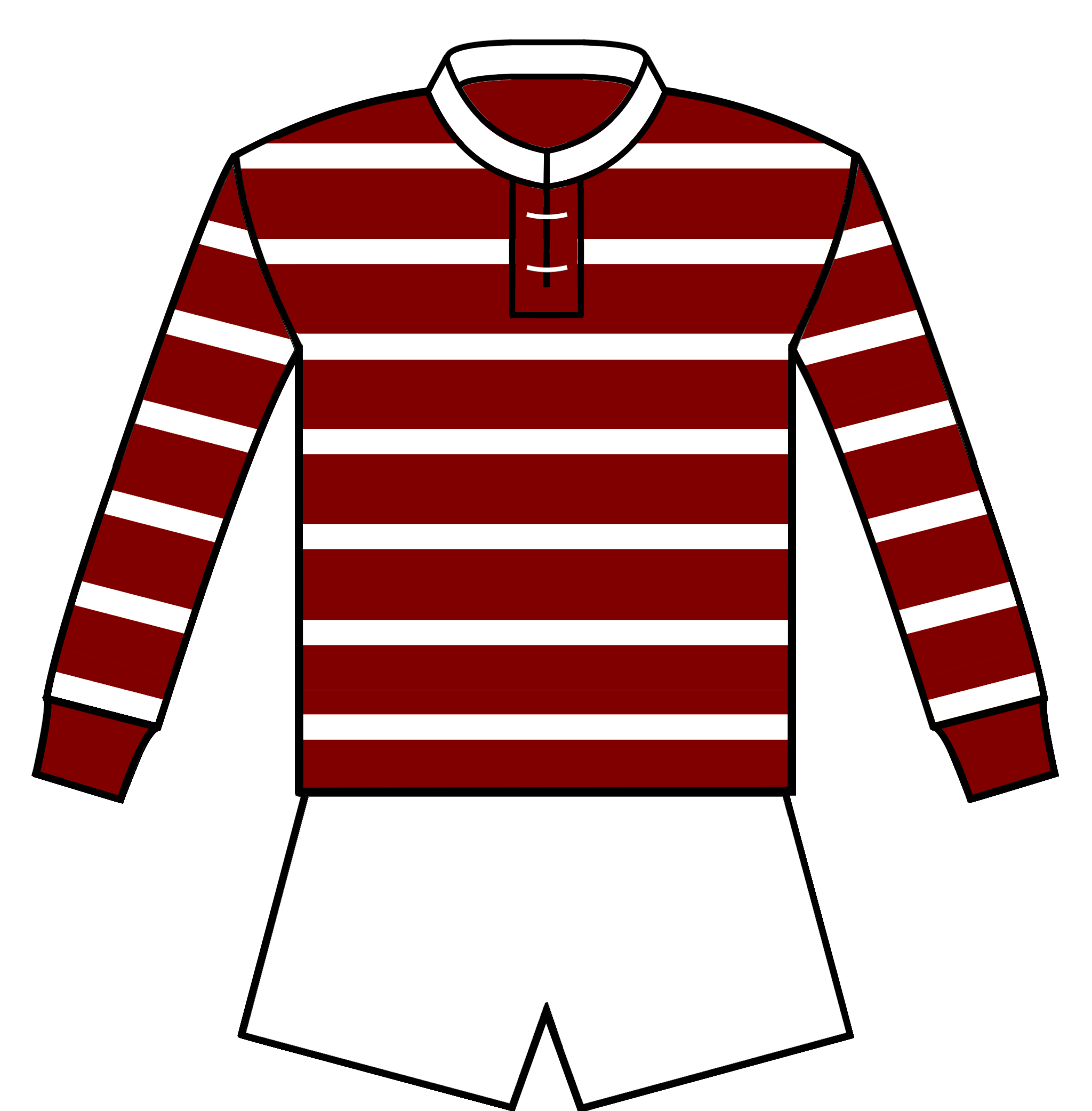
Manly-Warringah 8th season Ground: Brookvale Oval; Coach: Ray Norman; Captain: Roy Bull

Newtown 47th season Ground: Henson Park; Coach : Col Geelan; Captain: Col Geelan, Jim Evans

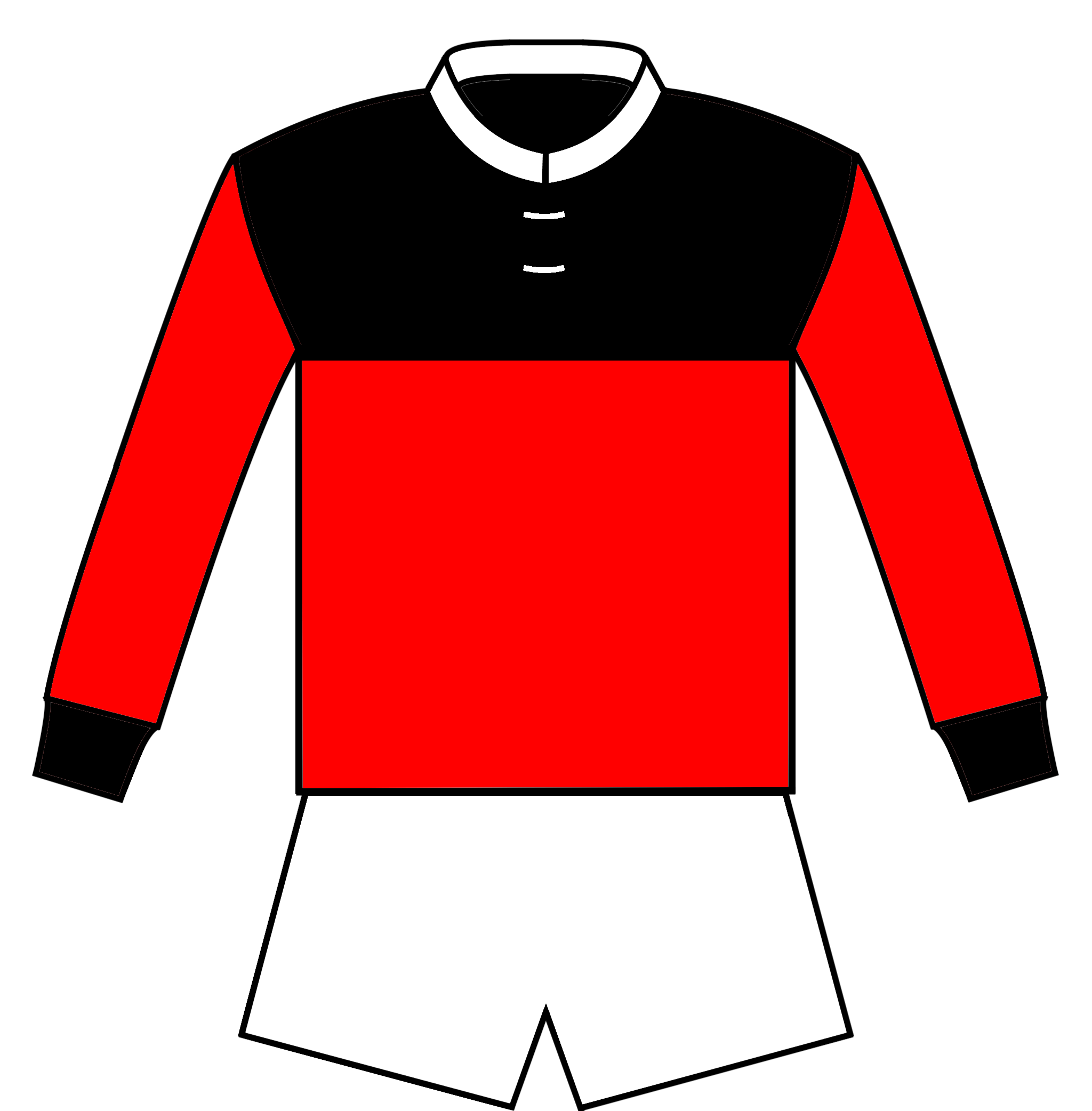
North Sydney 47th season Ground: North Sydney Oval; Coach: Rex Harrison; Captain: Bob Sullivan

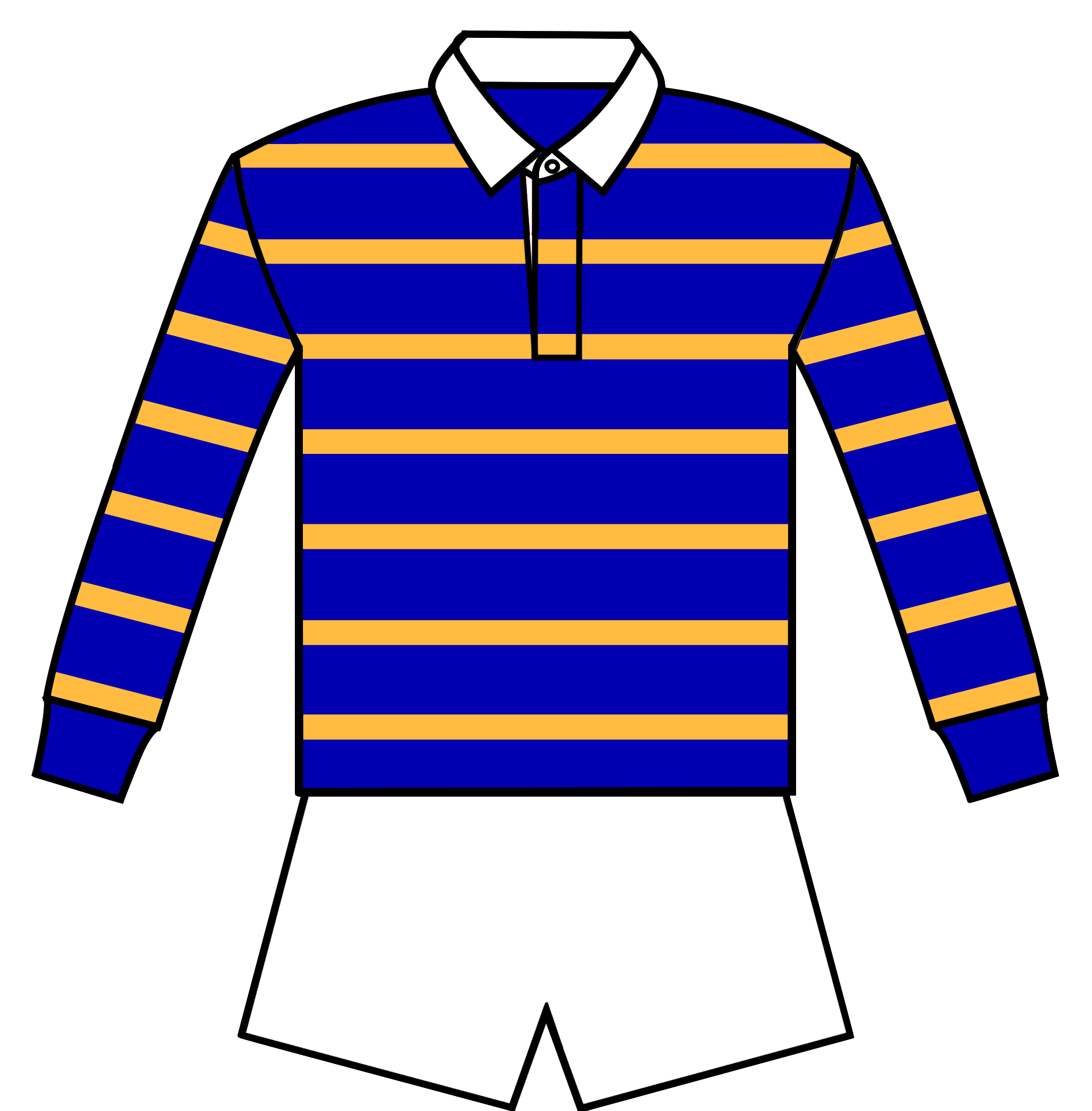
Parramatta 8th Season; Ground: Cumberland Oval; Captain-Coach: Charlie Gill

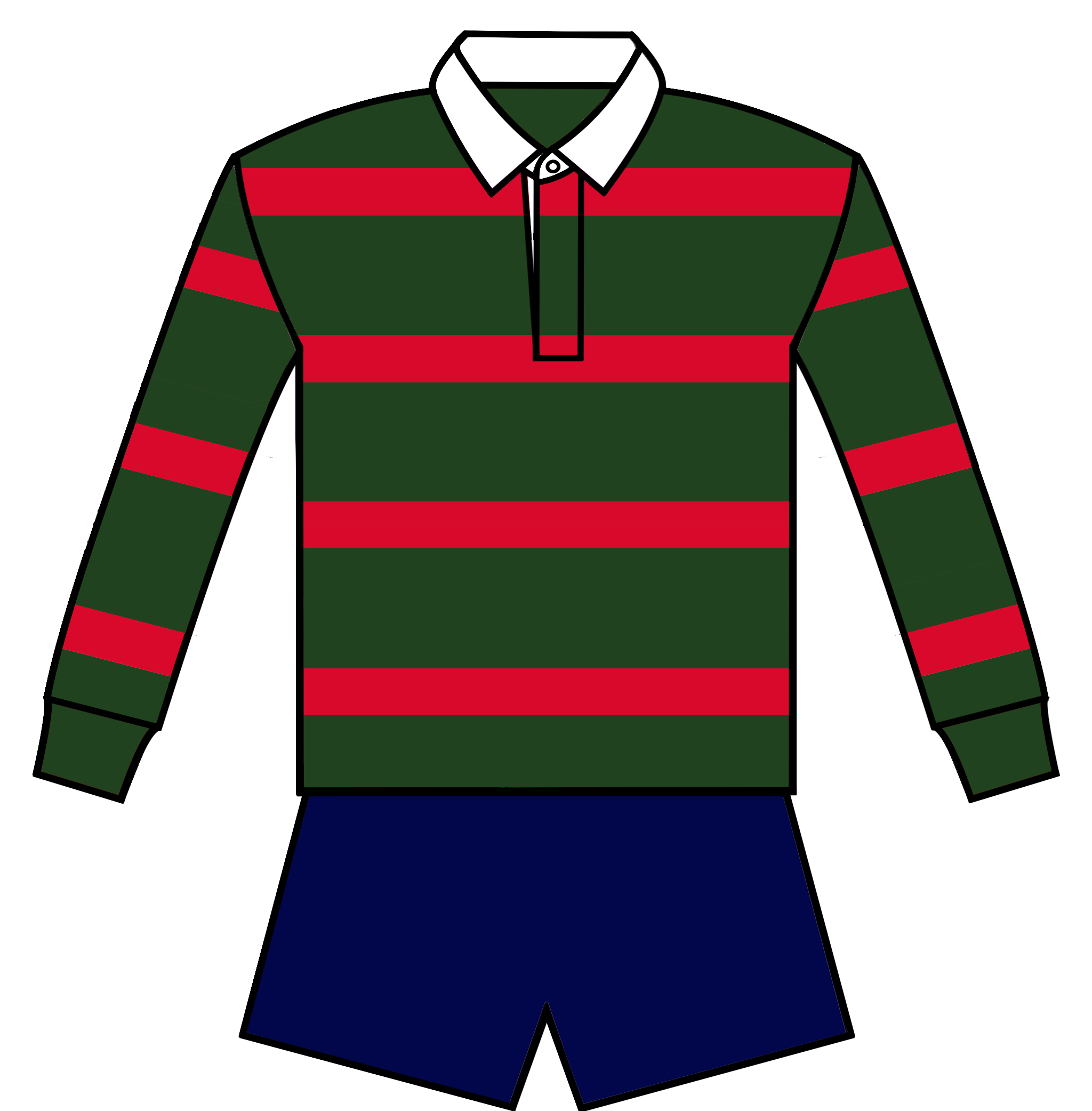
South Sydney 47th season Ground: Redfern Oval; Captain-coach: Jack Rayner

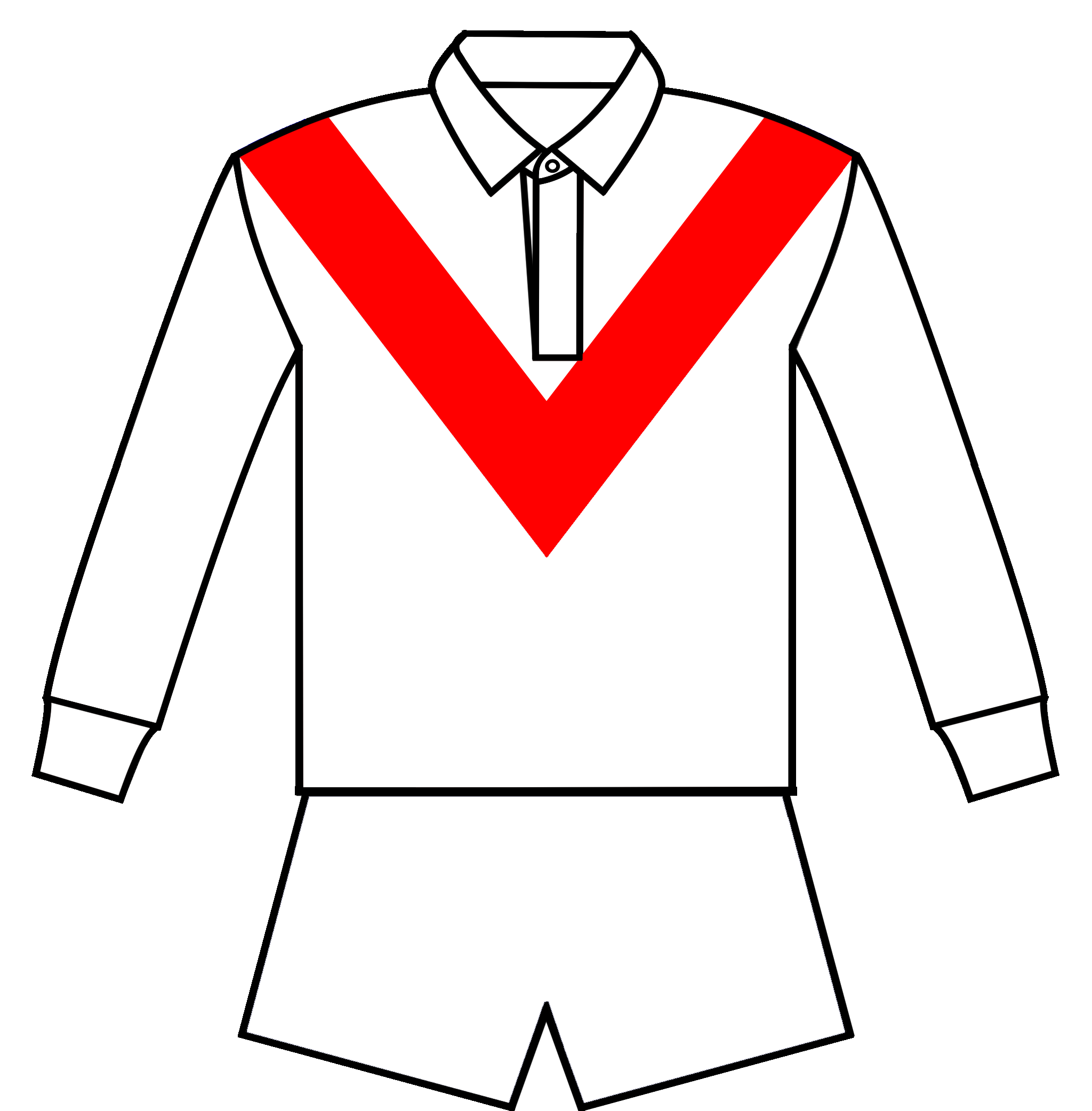
St. George 34th season Ground: Jubilee Oval; Captain-Coach: Ken Kearney

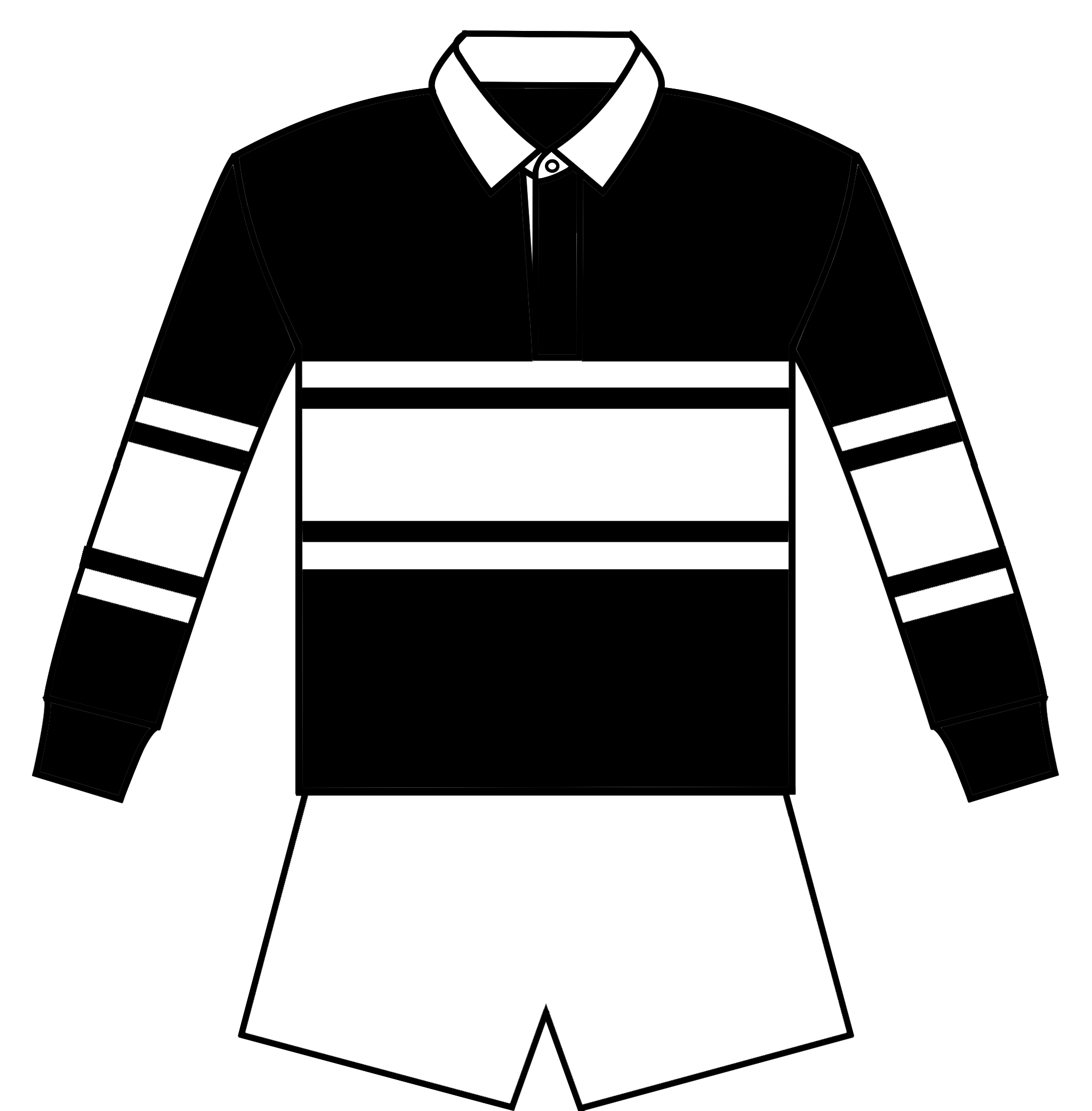
Western Suburbs 47th season Ground: Pratten Park; Captain-Coach: Keith Holman

=== Ladder ===
	Team	Pld	W	D	L	PF	PA	PD	Pts
1	Newtown	18	15	2	1	439	215	+224	32
2	South Sydney	18	14	1	3	473	255	+218	29
3	St. George	18	11	1	6	345	292	+53	23
4	North Sydney	18	10	2	6	415	320	+95	22
5	Manly	18	10	1	7	391	343	+48	21
6	Balmain	18	9	1	8	346	345	+1	19
7	Western Suburbs	18	6	1	11	287	374	-87	13
8	Canterbury	18	4	0	14	233	465	-232	8
9	Eastern Suburbs	18	3	1	14	257	493	-236	7
10	Parramatta	18	3	0	15	282	366	-84	6

=== Records set in 1954 ===
- South Sydney's Les Brennan set the standing record for the highest number of tries in a debut season with 29.
- Newtown winger Ray Preston's 34 tries remains second only to Dave Brown's 38 in 1935.
  - Preston and Kevin Considine combined for fifty-six tries during the season – easily a record for a pair of club wingers.
- In the last round on 21 August, Western Suburbs set a record for the highest losing score when they lost to Balmain 32–37. This was to be one of only two cases before the introduction of the 10-metre ruck rule in 1993 that a team scored over thirty points and lost the match.

== Finals ==
Home	Score	Away	Match information
Home	Score	Away	Date and time	Venue	Referee	Crowd
Semifinals
St. George	15–14	North Sydney	28 August 1954	Sydney Cricket Ground	Jack O'Brien	32,397
Newtown	14–24	South Sydney	4 September 1954	Sydney Cricket Ground	Darcy Lawler	38,520
Preliminary final
Newtown	27–13	St. George	11 September 1954	Sydney Cricket Ground	Darcy Lawler	32,303
Grand final
South Sydney	23–15	Newtown	18 September 1954	Sydney Cricket Ground	Jack O'Brien	45,759

=== Grand Final ===
South Sydney	Position	Newtown
13. Clive Churchill	FB	1. Gordon Clifford
12. Ian Moir	WG	2. Kevin Considine
9. Martin Gallagher	CE	6. Dick Poole
7. Greg Hawick	CE	4. Brian Clay
11. Les Brennan	WG	3. Ray Preston
8. John Dougherty	FE	53. Ray Kelly
21. Ray Mason	HB	7. Bobby Whitton
1. Denis Donoghue	PR	12. Jim Evans (c)
2. Ernie Hammerton	HK	46. Frank Johnson
3. Jim Richards	PR	11. Don Stait
18. Bernie Purcell	SR	10. Frank Narvo
4. Jack Rayner (Ca./Co.)	SR	9. Henry Holloway
6. Les Cowie	LK	8. Peter Ryan
	Coach	Col Geelan

In spite of Newtown finishing as minor premiers they hadn't beaten South Sydney in either regular season encounter. Souths had also won their semi-final meeting 24–14. In this, the NSWRFL's first Grand Final scheduled to determine the premiership winner, Souths were the victors. Legendary fullback Clive Churchill was outstanding setting up three of his side's five tries. The Bluebags stayed in the contest through the kicking boot of their Test fullback Gordon "Punchy" Clifford.

South Sydney 23 (tries: Cowie 2, Moir, Hawick, Dougherty. Goals: Purcell 4.)

Newtown 15 (tries: Narvo. Goals: Clifford 6.)

== Player statistics ==
The following statistics are as of the conclusion of Round 18.

Top 5 point scorers

Points	Player	Tries	Goals	Field goals
221	Ron Rowles	13	91	0
168	Alan Arkey	0	84	0
149	Bernie Purcell	9	61	0
133	George Bain	1	65	0
131	Gordon Clifford	1	63	1

Top 5 try scorers

Tries	Player
33	Ray Preston
28	Les Brennan
19	Ian Moir
19	Kevin Hole
16	Kevin Considine

Top 5 goal scorers

Goals	Player
91	Ron Rowles
84	Alan Arkey
65	George Bain
63	Gordon Clifford
61	Bernie Purcell

== Post-season ==
Following the grand final, nine players from the NSWRFL were selected in a squad of eighteen to represent Australia in the 1954 Rugby League World Cup in France.
