= Ray Kelly (rugby league) =

Australian rugby league player

Personal information
- Full name: Raymond Kelly
- Born: Gunnedah, New South Wales, Australia

Playing information
- Position: Five-eighth
Club
Years	Team	Pld	T	G	FG	P
1954–56	Newtown	47	10	0	0	30

Ray Kelly was an Australian rugby league footballer who played as a five-eighth in the 1950s. He played for Newtown in the New South Wales Rugby League (NSWRL) competition. He was the brother of Harold Kelly who also played for Newtown in the 1950s.

== Early life ==
Kelly was born in Gunnedah, New South Wales but grew up in Erskineville, New South Wales before being graded by Newtown.

== Playing career ==
Kelly made his first grade debut for Newtown in 1953. In 1954, Kelly was part of the Newtown side which claimed the minor premiership with the likes of Brian Clay, Kevin Considine and Ray Preston playing for the club at the time.

Kelly played at five-eighth in the 1954 NSWRL grand final against South Sydney which Newtown lost 23-15. The following year, Newtown again claimed the minor premiership and reached the 1955 NSWRL grand final against Souths. Newtown went into the game as favorites as South Sydney were without a few of their star players including future immortal Clive Churchill.

Kelly played at five-eighth in the game which Newtown led at halftime 8-4 before Souths came back to win a thrilling contest 12-11. This would be Newtown's last grand final appearance for another 26 years.

Kelly played one further season for Newtown before retiring at the end of 1956.
