= Gordon Clifford (rugby league) =

Australia international rugby league footballer

Personal information
- Full name: Gordon Lionel Clifford
- Born: 4 April 1928 Sydney, New South Wales, Australia
- Died: 22 November 2008 (aged 80) Arncliffe, New South Wales, Australia

Playing information
- Position: Fullback
Club
| Years | Team | Pld | T | G | FG | P |
|---|---|---|---|---|---|---|
| 1951–58 | Newtown | 114 | 7 | 444 | 4 | 917 |
| 1960 | Eastern Suburbs | 6 | 0 | 17 | 0 | 34 |
| | Total | 120 | 7 | 461 | 4 | 951 |
Representative
| Years | Team | Pld | T | G | FG | P |
| 1957–58 | New South Wales | 2 | 0 | 14 | 0 | 28 |
| 1956–58 | Australia | 8 | 0 | 24 | 0 | 48 |
- Source: Whiticker

Gordon Lionel Clifford (1928–2008), also known by the nickname of "Punchy", was an Australian professional rugby league footballer who played in the 1950s. A state and national representative fullback and prolific goal-kicker, he played his club football in Sydney mainly with Newtown, who have named him as one of their greatest ever players.

A South Sydney junior player, Clifford started playing in the NSWRFL premiership for the Newtown club in 1951. He played at fullback for Newtown in their loss to Souths in the 1954 NSWRFL season's grand final, kicking six goals. In the grand final of the 1955 NSWRFL season the same two sides again faced each other. Clifford missed a 79th minute field goal attempt and Souths were again victorious.

In 1956 Clifford was first selected to represent Australia in the 2nd Test against New Zealand, becoming Kangaroo No. 324. He was selected on the 1956–57 Kangaroo Tour and after the great Clive Churchill was injured in the 1st Test, Clifford took over as Australia's fullback playing in four Test matches and ten tour games and topping the tour points-scoring tally list with 94 points (2 tries, 44 goals). He made his first state appearance for New South Wales in 1957 and the following year with Churchill in his career twilight, Clifford displaced "the Little Master" in the domestic three Test series against the visiting British tourists. These would be Clifford's last representative appearances. He joined Eastern Suburbs for one season in 1960, and then retired from the sport.

== Bibliography ==
- Whiticker, Alan & Hudson, Glen (2006) The Encyclopedia of Rugby League Players, Gavin Allen Publishing, Sydney
- Andrews, Malcolm (2006) The ABC of Rugby League Austn Broadcasting Corpn, Sydney
