= Bobby Whitton =

Australian rugby league footballer

Personal information
- Full name: James Albert Whitton
- Born: 7 December 1932
- Died: 6 June 2008 (aged 75) Hurlstone Park, New South Wales

Playing information
- Position: Halfback
Club
Years	Team	Pld	T	G	FG	P
1951–60	Newtown	174	34	0	1	104
Representative
Years	Team	Pld	T	G	FG	P
1954–59	New South Wales	4	0	0	0	0
- Source: Whiticker/Hudson

Bobby Whitton (1932–2008) was an Australian rugby league player who played in the 1950s.

== Playing career ==
Whitton was born James Albert Whitton, was a favourite son of Newtown rugby league club over many years.

Whitton played ten straight seasons with Newtown between 1951 and 1960. He played halfback in the 1954 Grand Final and the 1955 Grand Final and captained the Newtown club on many occasions until his retirement in 1960.

Whitton represented New South Wales in three different series: 1954, 1956 and 1959. He left Sydney football in 1961 to take up the role of captain-coach of Wauchope R.L.F.C. He played over 170 games from Newtown during his career, and scored 34 tries.

Whitton died on 6 June 2008, aged 75 late of Hurlstone Park, New South Wales.
