= Herb Narvo =

Australian boxer, and rugby league footballer and coach

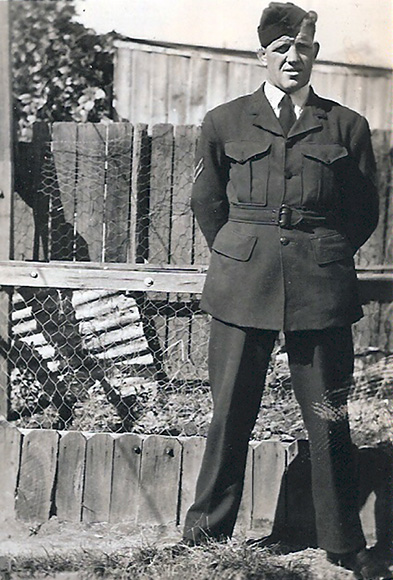
- Narvo in 1944

Personal information
- Full name: Hermann Olaf Frances Narvo
- Born: 19 August 1912 Ultimo, New South Wales, Australia
- Died: 28 July 1958 (aged 45) Newcastle, New South Wales, Australia

Playing information
- Position: Prop, Second-row
Club
Years	Team	Pld	T	G	FG	P
1937	Newtown	8	1	0	0	3
1938–41	Norths (Newcastle)
1943–45	Newtown	34	12	7	0	67
1946	St. George	13	3	8	0	25
1947	Cootamundra
1948	Camden
1949	Newtown	6	2	0	0	6
	Total	61	18	15	0	101
Representative
Years	Team	Pld	T	G	FG	P
1938–45	New South Wales	13	12	0	0	36
1937–38	Australia	4	2	0	0	6
1937–45	NSW City	3	0	0	0	0
1936–41	NSW Country	6	3	1	0	11

Coaching information
Club
Years	Team	Gms	W	D	L	W%
1946	St. George	16	11	0	5	69
- Relatives: Frank Narvo (son)

Hermann Olaf Frances "Herb" Narvo (19 August 1912 – 28 July 1958) was an Australian rugby league footballer and boxer of the 1930s and 1940s. He was a national representative rugby league player and national heavyweight boxing champion. He has been named among the nation's finest footballers and sportsman of the 20th century.

== Rugby league career ==
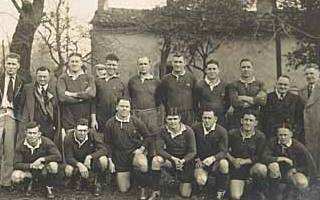
Narvo (back row 4th from left) with the 1937–38 Kangaroos

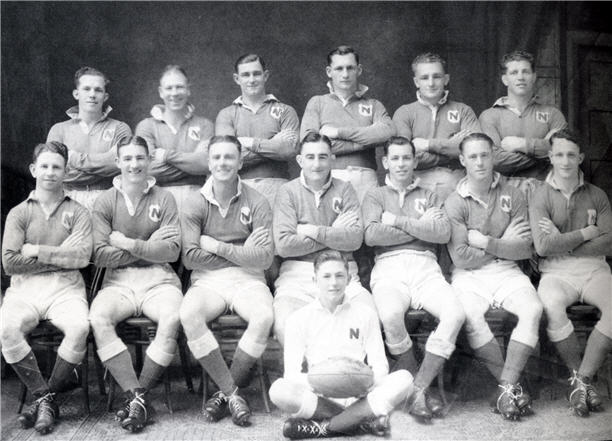
Narvo (standing far right) in Newtown's 1943 premiership team

Born in Sydney of German descent, but raised in Newcastle, Herb Narvo signed with Newtown in 1937 and soon shone as one of the form forwards of the competition. Following an injury to Joe Pearce, Narvo was a late call up to go on the 1937–38 Kangaroo tour where he starred, playing in four Tests, eighteen minor matches and scoring ten tour tries. He is listed on the Australian Players Register as Kangaroo No. 218.

He played for Norths Newcastle in 1938 and made state representative appearances for New South Wales from 1938 to 1941 but his national Test career was limited due to the war. Whilst in the RAAF Narvo helped the Newtown club win the 1943 New South Wales Rugby Football League premiership but along with Len Smith missed the final the following year due to his war service.

In 1946 he joined the St. George Dragons and as captain-coach, steered the club to a Grand final appearance in which they were defeated by the Balmain Tigers.

He captain-coached Maher Cup side Cootamundra in 1947, winning the Group 9 Premiership. He moved to Camden's team in 1948 before finishing his career in 1949 with Newtown.

His son, Frank Narvo played for Newtown (1954–1960) and St. George Dragons (1952–1953).

== Boxing career ==
Narvo was also a boxer of note, winning the Australian Heavyweight Championship in 1945. In only his 13th professional fight Narvo defeated Billy "Wocko" Britt in just 23 seconds to claim the Australian title.

He lost his boxing title to Jack Johnson in 1946 and captained St George in a club match the very next day.

== War service ==
He was in the Royal Australian Air Force during World War II. He was stationed at Richmond, New South Wales, and served as a physical training, boxing and paratroop instructor.

== Death ==
Narvo was hospitalized in 1958 at Royal Newcastle Hospital for several months during which he underwent several operations due to cancer. He died at his home on 28 July 1958, 22 days short of his 46th birthday.

He was buried at Sandgate Cemetery near Newcastle, New South Wales. His son, Frank Narvo, was a first grade footballer for the St George Dragons and Newtown Jets.

== Accolades ==
In February 2008, Narvo was named in the list of Australia's 100 Greatest Players (1908–2007) which was commissioned by the NRL and ARL to celebrate the code's centenary year in Australia.

Also in 2008, the centenary year of rugby league in Australia, Narvo was named in the Newtown Jets 18-man team of the century. He is also recognized the Newcastle Team of the Century in 2008.

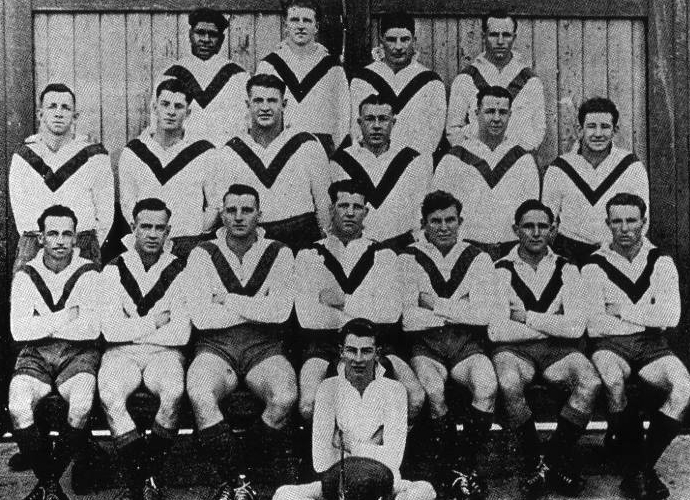
Narvo, captn/coach (front row centre) in StGeorge's 1946 side
