= Henry Holloway (rugby league) =

Australia international rugby league footballer & coach

Personal information
- Born: 20 March 1931 Sutherland, New South Wales, Australia
- Died: 5 August 1999 (aged 68) Brisbane, Queensland, Australia

Playing information
- Position: Second-row
Club
Years	Team	Pld	T	G	FG	P
1954–57	Newtown	69	6	0	0	18
1958	Waratah Mayfield
1959–6?	Southern Suburbs
196?–66	Redcliffe
	Total	69	6	0	0	18
Representative
Years	Team	Pld	T	G	FG	P
1955	New South Wales	1	0	0	0	0
1955	Australia	3	1	0	0	3
1959	Queensland	2	0	0	0	0
1960	Brisbane

Coaching information
Club
Years	Team	Gms	W	D	L	W%
1958	Waratah Mayfield
1960	Southern Suburbs	21	3	2	16	14
1963–66	Redcliffe	91	51	5	35	56
1974–76	Fortitude Valley	65	28	1	36	43
1979–80	Wynnum-Manly	42	9	2	31	21
	Total	219	91	10	118	42
Representative
Years	Team	Gms	W	D	L	W%
19??–??	Brisbane

Henry Holloway (March 20, 1931 – August 5, 1999) was an Australian rugby league footballer and coach. A national representative forward, he played club football in New South Wales and Queensland and represented both states. Holloway later coached in Brisbane.

== Career ==
Holloway served in Japan in 1950 with the RAAF. At the end of the 1954 NSWRFL season, Holloway's first with Newtown, he played at second-row forward in their loss to South Sydney in the grand final. During the following season, Holloway was selected to represent Australia against the touring French team, becoming Kangaroo No. 315. At the end of the 1955 NSWRFL season he again played at second-row forward in the grand final which Newtown lost to Souths by one point.

Holloway then moved north, as captain/coach for Waratah Mayfield Cheetahs in the Newcastle Rugby League in 1958 and joining the Brisbane Rugby League's Souths club. In 1959, Holloway played in the Queensland victory over New South Wales that attracted 35,261 spectators, smashing Brisbane's previous record for an interstate match of 22,817. In 1960, he was captain-coach of Souths. He also played for the Brisbane team in the Bulimba Cup. Holloway later captain-coached the Redcliffe club from 1963 to 1966, winning the grand final with them in 1965.

Holloway later coached the Fortitude Valley club, taking them to premiership victories in 1970 and 1974. He coached a combined Brisbane side to the final of the 1979 Amco Cup. During the 1970s and 1980s, Holloway coached the Wynnum Manly Seagulls.

Holloway died in Brisbane, on 5 August 1999 aged 68.

== Published sources ==
- Whiticker, Alan; Hudson, Glen (2007). The Encyclopedia of Rugby League Players. Wetherill Park, New South Wales: Gary Allen Pty Ltd. p. 244. ISBN 978-1-877082-93-1.
