= Frank Narvo =

Australian rugby league footballer

- Narvo 1954

Personal information
- Full name: Francis James Narvo
- Born: 24 April 1933; Wickham, New South Wales, Australia
- Died: 22 July 2015 (aged 82); New Lambton, New South Wales, Australia

Playing information
- Position: Second-row
Club
Years	Team	Pld	T	G	FG	P
1952–53	St George Dragons	4	2	0	0	6
1954–60	Newtown	97	10	1	0	32
	Total	101	12	1	0	38
- Source: Whiticker/Hudson
- Father: Herb Narvo

Francis James 'Frank' Narvo (24 April 1933 – 22 July 2015) was an Australian rugby league footballer who played in the 1950s.

== Career ==
Son of the great rugby league player and boxer Herb Narvo, Frank Narvo started his career at St George Dragons as a junior, and later played two seasons in first grade between 1952 and 1953. He moved to Newtown in 1954 and played seven seasons with the club before retiring at the end of the 1960 season. He played in two losing grand final teams with Newtown. He scored a try in the 1954 Grand Final, but Newtown were beaten by South Sydney Rabbitohs 23–15. The following year he again played for Newtown in the 1955 Grand Final, and again they played Souths, and were again defeated although this time by the slenderest of margins 12–11. Frank Narvo played second-row in both matches.

Frank Narvo battled prostate and bladder cancer in his later years, and died at his New Lambton home on 22 July 2015. A large funeral service was held for Frank on 26 July 2015 at Newcastle Christ Church Cathedral. Narvo was survived by his five children and twenty grandchildren.
