= Don Stait =

Australian rugby league footballer

Personal information
- Full name: Donald George Stait
- Born: 6 January 1928 Portland, New South Wales, Australia
- Died: 18 June 2007 (aged 79) Bronte, New South Wales, Australia

Playing information
- Position: Prop
Club
Years	Team	Pld	T	G	FG	P
1950–52	Western Suburbs	20	2	1	0	8
1953–56	Newtown	64	2	0	0	6
	Total	84	4	1	0	14
Representative
Years	Team	Pld	T	G	FG	P
1948	NSW Country	1	0	0	0	0

Donald George Stait (1928–2007) was an Australian rugby league footballer who played in the 1950s.

== Background ==
Stait was born in Portland, New South Wales.

== Playing career ==
Stait played with Western Suburbs for three seasons between 1950 and 1952. He played in a Grand Final for Wests in his first season when the team was defeated by South Sydney Rabbitohs in the 1950 Grand Final.

He later moved to Newtown for another three seasons between 1954 and 1956. He appeared in two losing Grand Finals with Newtown in 1954 and 1955.

Stait retired after the 1956 season.

Stait died on 18 June 2007, at Bronte, New South Wales aged 79.
