= J. J. Giltinan Shield =

Trophy awarded annually in Australian rugby league

- Country: Australia; New Zealand
- Presented by: NRL

History
- First award: 1951 (1997 to Minor premier)
- Most wins: St. George Dragons (13 Titles)
- Most recent: Penrith Panthers (2026)

The J.J. Giltinan Shield is an Australian rugby league trophy that has been awarded annually since 1951, currently to the minor premiers of each year’s National Rugby League competition. It was named after James J. Giltinan who was central to the founding of rugby league in Australia.

Giltinan died in September 1950 and the shield was created and named in his honour by the New South Wales Rugby Football League (NSWRFL); it was introduced for the following year's season. From 1951 to 1994, the Shield was awarded to the NSWRFL (from 1984 New South Wales Rugby League) premiership’s winner of the Grand Final, replacing the Labor Daily Cup (named after Sydney’s Labor Daily newspaper) that had been awarded from 1934 to 1950. In the 1995 and 1996 seasons, it was awarded to the Australian Rugby League competition’s winners of the Grand Final.

In addition to the Shield, premiership winning teams received the W. D. & H. O. Wills Cup (named after British tobacco company W. D. & H. O. Wills) from 1960 to 1981, the Winfield Cup from 1982 to 1995 and the Optus Cup in 1996.

Since 1997 and the inception of the National Rugby League (NRL), the J.J. Giltinan Shield has been repurposed, awarded to the NRL competition's minor premiers for each season. Winners of each year’s NRL Grand Final receive the National Rugby League Premiership Trophy, named since 2013 the Provan-Summons trophy.

== Winners ==
Season	Winners
Awarded to Premiers
1951	South Sydney Rabbitohs
1952	Western Suburbs Magpies
1953	South Sydney Rabbitohs
1954	South Sydney Rabbitohs
1955	South Sydney Rabbitohs
1956	St. George Dragons
1957	St. George Dragons
1958	St. George Dragons
1959	St. George Dragons
1960	St. George Dragons
1961	St. George Dragons
1962	St. George Dragons
1963	St. George Dragons
1964	St. George Dragons
1965	St. George Dragons
1966	St. George Dragons
1967	South Sydney Rabbitohs
1968	South Sydney Rabbitohs
1969	Balmain Tigers
1970	South Sydney Rabbitohs
1971	South Sydney Rabbitohs
1972	Manly-Warringah Sea Eagles
1973	Manly-Warringah Sea Eagles
1974	Eastern Suburbs Roosters
1975	Eastern Suburbs Roosters
1976	Manly-Warringah Sea Eagles
1977	St. George Dragons
1978	Manly-Warringah Sea Eagles
1979	St. George Dragons
1980	Canterbury-Bankstown Bulldogs
1981	Parramatta Eels
1982	Parramatta Eels
1983	Parramatta Eels
1984	Canterbury-Bankstown Bulldogs
1985	Canterbury-Bankstown Bulldogs
1986	Parramatta Eels
1987	Manly-Warringah Sea Eagles
1988	Canterbury-Bankstown Bulldogs
1989	Canberra Raiders
1990	Canberra Raiders
1991	Penrith Panthers
1992	Brisbane Broncos
1993	Brisbane Broncos
1994	Canberra Raiders
1995	Sydney Bulldogs
1996	Manly-Warringah Sea Eagles
Awarded to Minor Premiers
1997	Manly-Warringah Sea Eagles
1998	Brisbane Broncos
1999	Cronulla-Sutherland Sharks
2000	Brisbane Broncos
2001	Parramatta Eels
2002	New Zealand Warriors
2003	Penrith Panthers
2004	Sydney Roosters
2005	Parramatta Eels
2006	Withheld ^{1}
2007	Withheld ^{1}
2008	Withheld ^{1}
2009	St. George-Illawarra Dragons
2010	St. George-Illawarra Dragons
2011	Melbourne Storm
2012	Canterbury-Bankstown Bulldogs
2013	Sydney Roosters
2014	Sydney Roosters
2015	Sydney Roosters
2016	Melbourne Storm
2017	Melbourne Storm
2018	Sydney Roosters
2019	Melbourne Storm
2020	Penrith Panthers
2021	Melbourne Storm
2022	Penrith Panthers
2023	Penrith Panthers
2024	Melbourne Storm
2025	Canberra Raiders
2026	Penrith Panthers

^{1} The Melbourne Storm were stripped of the 2006, 2007 and 2008 minor premierships on 22 April 2010 due to salary cap breaches.

== Most Wins ==
=== Premierships (1951 - 1996) ===
Tally	Club	Seasons
13	St. George Dragons	1956, 1957, 1958, 1959, 1960, 1961, 1962, 1963, 1964, 1965, 1966, 1977, 1979
8	South Sydney Rabbitohs	1951, 1953, 1954, 1955, 1967, 1968, 1970, 1971
6	Manly-Warringah Sea Eagles	1972, 1973, 1976, 1978, 1987, 1996
5	Canterbury-Bankstown Bulldogs	1980, 1984, 1985, 1998, 1995
4	Parramatta Eels	1981, 1982, 1983, 1986
3	Canberra Raiders	1989, 1990, 1994
2	Brisbane Broncos	1992, 1993
2	Eastern Suburbs Roosters	1974, 1975
1	Penrith Panthers	1991
1	Balmain Tigers	1969
1	Western Suburbs Magpies	1952

=== Minor Premierships (1997 - Present) ===
Tally	Club	Seasons
6	Melbourne Storm	2011, 2016, 2017, 2019, 2021, 2024
5	Penrith Panthers	2003, 2020, 2022, 2023, 2026
5	Sydney Roosters	2004, 2013, 2014, 2015, 2018
2	St. George-Illawarra Dragons	2009, 2010
2	Parramatta Eels	2001, 2005
2	Brisbane Broncos	1998, 2000
1	Canberra Raiders	2025
1	Canterbury-Bankstown Bulldogs	2012
1	New Zealand Warriors	2002
1	Cronulla-Sutherland Sharks	1999
1	Manly-Warringah Sea Eagles	1997

=== Total (1951 - Present) ===
Tally	Club	Seasons
13	St. George Dragons	1956, 1957, 1958, 1959, 1960, 1961, 1962, 1963, 1964, 1965, 1966, 1977, 1979
8	South Sydney Rabbitohs	1951, 1953, 1954, 1955, 1967, 1968, 1970, 1971
7	Eastern Suburbs/Sydney Roosters	1974, 1975, 2004, 2013, 2014, 2015, 2018
7	Manly-Warringah Sea Eagles	1972, 1973, 1976, 1978, 1987, 1996, 1997
6	Penrith Panthers	1991, 2003, 2020, 2022, 2023, 2026
6	Melbourne Storm	2011, 2016, 2017, 2019, 2021, 2024
6	Canterbury-Bankstown Bulldogs	1980, 1984, 1985, 1998, 1995, 2012
6	Parramatta Eels	1981, 1982, 1983, 1986, 2001, 2005
4	Canberra Raiders	1989, 1990, 1994, 2025
4	Brisbane Broncos	1992, 1993, 1998, 2000
2	St. George-Illawarra Dragons	2009, 2010
1	New Zealand Warriors	2002
1	Cronulla-Sutherland Sharks	1999
1	Balmain Tigers	1969
1	Western Suburbs Magpies	1952
