= Ernie Hammerton =

Australia international rugby league footballer

Personal information
- Full name: Ernest Alfred Hammerton
- Born: 15 May 1927; Sydney, New South Wales, Australia
- Died: 4 July 1991 (aged 64); Kyeemagh, New South Wales, Australia

Playing information
- Position: Hooker
Club
Years	Team	Pld	T	G	FG	P
1947–58	South Sydney	157	10	1	0	32
Representative
Years	Team	Pld	T	G	FG	P
1951	City NSW	1	0	0	0	0
1951–56	New South Wales	6	0	0	0	0
1951	Australia	1	0	0	0	0

Ernest Alfred Hammerton OAM (May 15, 1927 - July 4, 1991) was an Australian professional rugby league footballer who played in the 1940s and 1950s. An Australian international and New South Wales interstate representative hooker, he played club football in the NSWRFL Premiership for South Sydney, appearing in seven consecutive grand finals for them. Hammerton later became a selector for both the New South Wales and Australian national teams.

== Playing career ==
A South Sydney junior, at the end of the 1949 NSWRFL season Hammerton played in his first grand final at hooker for South Sydney who lost to St. George. At the end of the 1950 season Hammerton played in the grand final at hooker for South Sydney who defeated Western Suburbs. In 1951 Hammerton played in the grand final at hooker for South Sydney, scoring a try in their victory over Manly-Warringah. In 1951 Hammerton was selected to represent Australia, becoming Kangaroo No. 288. He played a sole test match, a 23–11 victory over the touring French team.

In the 1952 NSWRFL season Hammerton played in the grand final at hooker for South Sydney who lost to Western Suburbs. At the end of the 1953 NSWRFL season Hammerton played in the grand final at hooker for South Sydney, scoring a try in their victory over St. George. In season 1954 Hammerton played in the grand final at hooker for South Sydney who defeated Newtown. At the end of the 1955 NSWRFL season Hammerton played in the grand final at hooker for South Sydney who again defeated Newtown. South Sydney came within one match of the 1957 NSWRFL season's grand final, however Hammerton was dropped from the team for the qualifier in favour of 22-year-old Brian Murray. Souths lost the match. The following season was Hammerton's last in first grade.

== Post-playing career ==
Hammerton was appointed a New South Wales selector in the 1970 pre-season. In 1972 Hammerton, who was already a New South Wales selector, won a position on the Australian Rugby League selection committee. A decade later he was still a national selector. He was replaced as chairman of Australian selectors by Don Furner in the 1989 pre-season.

In 1990 Hammerton was awarded the Medal of the Order of Australia for service to rugby league.
