= Col Pearce =

Australian rugby league referee

Personal information
- Full name: Colin Frederick Pearce
- Born: 1917 Newtown, New South Wales, Australia
- Died: 10 June 2004 (aged 86) Newtown, New South Wales, Australia

Refereeing information
Years	Competition	Apps
1946–1968	NSW Rugby League	343
1960–1967	Test matches	9

Colin Frederick Pearce (1917 – 10 June 2004) was an Australian rugby league referee. He is one of the most widely known and widely respected referees in the history of rugby league.

Pearce, born in Newtown, New South Wales, was originally more interested in cricket but that changed to rugby league due to his fascination with the rules and interpretations of the rules of rugby league. He began refereeing in 1946, he was promoted to the first grade fixtures towards the end of the 1947 season. He then took charge of nine test matches between 1960 and 1967, three World Cup matches in 1968 and six Grand Finals, his first being in 1955, and then the others between 1964 and 1968. He enjoyed a career of 343 first grade games. He was authoritative yet he allowed the game to flow. He had a keen relationship with the players where they would show him respect due to his fair and consistent decision making. His motto was that rugby league referees should "eat, sleep and drink the rules of rugby league" He was elected to the Rugby League Referee's Examination Board in 1951.

After his retirement from rugby league refereeing, he had a long career as a rugby league commentator in the Sydney electronic and print media, with 2UE, Channel 7 and The Sydney Morning Herald.

Pearce later became a journalist, writing featured columns for The Sun-Herald.

Pearce died from pneumonia on 10 June 2004, aged 86.

== Grand finals – match reports ==
1955, 1964, 1965, 1966, 1967, 1968.
