= Les Brennan =

Australian rugby league footballer (1931–2026)

- Born: Leslie Albert Brennan; 18 April 1931; Sydney, New South Wales, Australia
- Died: 25 June 2026 (aged 95)
- Spouse: Margaret Eileen Jewell (m. 1954, d. 2013)
- Children: 4
- Rugby league career

Playing information
- Position: Wing
Club
Years	Team	Pld	T	G	FG	P
1954–1955	South Sydney	24	32	0	0	96

Leslie Albert Brennan (18 April 1931 – 25 June 2026) was an Australian rugby league footballer who played for the South Sydney Rabbitohs in the New South Wales Rugby League competition.

Brennan held the record for the highest strike rate (tries per game) in Australian first grade rugby league history (minimum 20 games), scoring 32 tries in 24 games (1.33 per game). He also held the record for the 5th most number of tries scored in a season, scoring 29 tries in 19 matches in the 1954 season. This was, at the time of his death, the record for a debut season. Brennan however was not the highest try scorer for the 1954 season, finishing second to Ray Preston of Newtown who scored 34. The only player to have scored more than 34 tries in a season was Dave Brown, who scored 38 tries in 1935, playing just 15 games for Easts.

He was also one of only seven players in Australian first grade history who have scored more tries than have played games (minimum 20 games): Les Brennan (32 tries in 24 games), Don Manson (24 tries in 21 games), Harold Horder (152 tries in 136 games), Charlie Hazelton (27 tries in 26 games), Johnny Graves (79 tries in 77 games), Reg Gasnier (127 tries in 125 games), and Fred Tottey (77 tries in 76 games).

Brennan only played a further five matches in his career, scoring three tries before his retirement. A breakout of boils limited his play in the 1955 season, however it was the crushed vertebrae which he suffered in the 1954 grand final that forced him into retirement. After the five games in 1955, Brennan decided to retire as playing with his injury was unsustainable.

== 1954 Grand Final ==
South Sydney had won the premiership three of the last four seasons (1950, 1951, and 1953) and had beaten Newtown in the major semi-final just two weeks prior. As they had won the major semi-final, South Sydney earned a week off, moving directly to the grand final. In this week off, Brennan married his wife Margaret, with whom he stayed until her death in 2013. After the wedding, Les and Margaret drove up to Coolangatta for their honeymoon, where they stayed until the Thursday before Les needed to be back for training. Les and Margaret flew back down to Sydney on the Thursday, before meeting their opponents (Newtown) in the grand final on the Saturday.

Playing at the SCG in front of a crowd of 45,759, South Sydney led going into halftime. Not long into the second half, Brennan suffered a concussion and a crushed vertebrae in a tackle. Due to there not being any reserve players, Brennan played on and South Sydney held on to win 23–15. On the night of the grand final, Les and Margaret flew back to Coolangatta to continue their honeymoon. Les woke up the next morning with no memory of the second half or how they got to Coolangatta. Margaret handed him the newspaper, which alerted him that they did indeed go on to win the grand final.

Brennan was told by his doctors that having an operation on the crushed vertebrae would be very risky, so he never went ahead with it. As a result, Les still suffered from his injury until his death.

== Personal life and death ==
In 1954, Brennan married Margaret Eileen Jewell, and had four children. She died in 2013.

Brennan died on 25 June 2026, at the age of 95. He had been suffering from a leaky heart valve for many years, and was hospitalised two weeks before his death.
