= 1954 Eastern Suburbs season =

← 1953	1955 →

Eastern Suburbs (now known as the Sydney Roosters) competed in the New South Wales Rugby League (NSWRL) premiership in 1954.

== Details ==
- Lineup – Ray Armstrong, Ferris Ashton(Capt-Coach), John Bell, Ron Booth, Danny Byrnes, Kevin Byrne, Ray Chadwick, Ray Christopher, Charlie Cooksley, Kevin Clark, W.Dowsley, Kevin Doyle, Terry Fearnley, Jack Gibson, Ken Hunter, Ray Hyde, Tommy Kaine, Frank Lawrence, H.Lewis, R.Maloney, K.McDonald, Frank Murphy, Paul Plyers, Barry Russell, K.Small, Fred Smith, Ron Sudlow, Alan Wilson.

== Ladder ==
	Team	Pld	W	D	L	PF	PA	PD	Pts
1	Newtown	18	15	2	1	439	215	+224	32
2	South Sydney	18	14	1	3	473	255	+218	29
3	St. George	18	11	1	6	345	292	+53	23
4	North Sydney	18	10	2	6	415	320	+95	22
5	Manly-Warringah	18	10	1	7	391	343	+48	21
6	Balmain	18	9	1	8	346	345	+1	19
7	Western Suburbs	18	6	1	11	287	374	-87	13
8	Canterbury-Bankstown	18	4	0	14	233	465	-232	8
9	EASTERN SUBURBS	18	3	1	14	257	493	-236	7
10	Parramatta	18	3	0	15	282	366	-84	6

== Season summary ==
- 1954 saw the introduction of the famous Eastern Suburbs 'v' style of jersey which was modeled on the French design.
- One of the few highlights of the year was beating traditional rivals and eventual competition winners South Sydney 26–25 in round 6.

Preceded by 1953	Season; 1954	Succeeded by 1955
