= Dale Puren =

Australian rugby league footballer (1933–2022)

Personal information
- Full name: Dale Francis Puren
- Born: 12 February 1933 Sydney, New South Wales, Australia
- Died: 2 May 2022 (aged 89)

Playing information
- Position: Wing
Club
Years	Team	Pld	T	G	FG	P
1953	Western Suburbs	10	1	0	0	3
1955–59	South Sydney	50	30	27	0	144
1961	North Sydney	9	2	0	0	6
	Total	69	33	27	0	153

Dale Puren (12 February 1933 – 2 May 2022) was an Australian rugby league footballer who played in the 1950s and 1960s for North Sydney, South Sydney and Western Suburbs as a winger.

== Playing career ==
Puren made his first grade debut for Western Suburbs in 1953 and played 10 games for the club before switching to South Sydney. In 1955, Puren won a premiership with Souths in his first year at the club as they defeated Newtown 12-11 in the grand final. By this stage, Souths had already claimed 4 premiership victories in the 1950s but were unable to add to that tally losing preliminary finals in 1956 and 1957 with Puren being a member of those squads. After most of the Souths stars had retired or moved on, the club went through a period of decline but Puren stayed loyal to the team playing with the side until the end of 1959. In 1961, Puren joined North Sydney and played one season for the club making 9 appearances scoring two tries before retiring.

Puren died in May 2022.
