= Kevin Considine =

Australian rugby league footballer (1930–2023)

Personal information
- Full name: Kevin William Considine
- Born: 5 January 1930 Canterbury, New South Wales, Australia
- Died: 6 June 2023 (aged 93)

Playing information
- Position: Wing
Club
Years	Team	Pld	T	G	FG	P
1952–60	Newtown	138	87	93	0	447
1961	Parramatta	9	1	10	0	23
	Total	147	88	103	0	470

Kevin William Considine (5 January 1930 – 6 June 2023) was an Australian rugby league footballer who played in the 1950s and 1960s.

== Playing career ==
Considine started his career as a Canterbury junior from the Lakemba J.R.L.F.C. and was graded with Newtown in 1951. He went on to play nine seasons of first grade between 1952 and 1960 at Newtown, and was a prolific points scorer.

Considine played 138 games for Newtown and scored 87 tries, kicked 93 goals for a total of 447 points. Considine scored 22 tries in 1954 and built up a great wing partnership with Ray Preston during this era. Kevin Considine played in the 1954 Grand Final and the 1955 Grand Final. He finished his first grade career at Parramatta in 1961, although he returned to Newtown in 1968 as a committeeman, and was later secretary-manager of Newtown Leagues Club. He remained in the club/hotel industry for much of his working life.

== Death ==
Considine died of cancer in June 2023, at the age of 93.
