= Les Hampson =

Australian rugby league footballer

Personal information
- Full name: Lesley James Hampson
- Born: 5 April 1934 Sydney, New South Wales, Australia
- Died: 16 July 1998 (aged 64) Grafton, New South Wales, Australia

Playing information
- Position: Prop
Club
| Years | Team | Pld | T | G | FG | P |
|---|---|---|---|---|---|---|
| 1955–59 | Newtown | 35 | 0 | 0 | 0 | 0 |
| 1960 | Eastern Suburbs | 10 | 0 | 0 | 0 | 0 |
| | Total | 45 | 0 | 0 | 0 | 0 |
Representative
| Years | Team | Pld | T | G | FG | P |
| 1956 | New South Wales | 2 | 0 | 0 | 0 | 0 |

Les Hampson (born 1934) was an Australian rugby league footballer who played in the 1950s and 1960s. He played for Newtown and Eastern Suburbs in the New South Wales Rugby League (NSWRL) competition.

== Playing career ==
Hampson made his first grade debut for Newtown in 1955. Hampson was part of the Newtown side which claimed the minor premiership that year. Newtown would go on and reach the 1955 NSWRL grand final against Souths. Newtown went into the game as favourites as South Sydney were without a few of their star players, including future immortal Clive Churchill. Souths reached the grand final on the back of 9 victories in a row, including 2 sudden death finals games.

Hampson played at prop in the game which Newtown led at halftime 8–4 before Souths came back to win a thrilling contest 12–11. This would be Newtown's last grand final appearance for another 26 years. In 1956, Hampson was selected to play for New South Wales.

Hampson played with Newtown until the end of 1959 before departing the club to join Eastern Suburbs. Hampson played 1 season for Easts in 1960 as the club reached the grand final against St George. Hampson missed out on playing in the final as St George won convincingly 31–6.
