= Brian Clay =

Australia international rugby league footballer

Brian Joseph Clay
Personal information
- Born: 18 April 1935 Sydney, New South Wales, Australia
- Died: 2 September 1987 (aged 52) Sydney, New South Wales, Australia

Playing information
- Position: Five-eighth, Lock
Club
Years	Team	Pld	T	G	FG	P
1953–55	Newtown	30	11	0	0	33
1956	Griffith
1957–67	St. George	183	33	0	0	99
	Total	213	44	0	0	132
Representative
Years	Team	Pld	T	G	FG	P
1957–59	New South Wales	9	3	0	0	9
1957–60	Australia	9	1	1	0	5
1956	NSW Country	2	0	0	0	0
1957–61	NSW City	4	2	0	0	6

Brian Joseph 'Poppa' Clay (1935–1987) was an Australian rugby league footballer who played in the 1950s and 1960s. He was a five-eighth with the St. George Dragons during their 11-year consecutive premiership winning run from 1956 to 1966. He was a representative in the Australian national team in 1957 and from 1959 to 1960 earning five Test caps plus three World Cup appearances. He is considered one of the nation's finest footballers of the 20th century.

== Background ==
Clay grew up in the inner Sydney suburb of St Peters. He played schoolboy football for Newtown Technical School and captained a New South Wales Schoolboys side. He began losing his hair as a teenager and early in his football career became known as 'Poppa'.

== Professional playing career ==
=== Newtown ===
Clay was graded by Newtown in 1953 aged 18. He played in the club's losing Grand final teams of 1954 and 1955, learning the ropes against the powerful early 1950s South Sydney sides.

=== St. George & Representative career ===
After Clay spent the 1956 country season with Griffith in Group 20, Frank Facer offered him a contract with St George as a lock forward from 1957. He made his State and International debut in 1957 and played a major role in Australia's success in the 1957 World Cup. When Johnny Raper joined the club in 1959 Clay moved to five-eighth at which position he enjoyed most success.

On field Clay ran stampeding, battering charges like an extra forward and would then set the wider backs in motion with precise passes. His outside backs Reg Gasnier and Johnny King benefitted from the opposition defence Clay would absorb on their behalf.

In 1959 Clay played in the New South Wales loss to Queensland that attracted 35,261 spectators, smashing Brisbane's previous record for an interstate match of 22,817. He went on the 1959 Kangaroo Tour of Britain and France appearing in five test matches and sixteen minor Tour games. Clay is listed on the Australian Players Register as Kangaroo No. 332. He alternated with Johnny Raper between lock and five-eighth during the tour.

Clay played 200 club games (183 1st grade) for the St. George Dragons between 1957 and 1967 and played in eight of the famous Grand Final victories. He missed the 1962 and 1963 Grand Finals with broken arm injuries. A knee cartilage operation in 1967 meant that he played his last games at less than 100% fitness. His 200th and last career game was the 1967 final against the Kevin Ryan led Canterbury Bulldogs where the ageing Dragons outfit went down 12-11 and the record breaking premiership run ended.

== Premiership Success and Accolades ==
Brian Clay stands in second place behind his St George team-mate Norm Provan for the highest number of grand final appearances ever, with ten (including two with Newtown). Provan appeared in grand finals on 11 occasions. Clay played in an 8 grand final victories and was regarded as one of the greatest players to ever represent the St. George Dragons.

Brian Clay was awarded Life Membership of the St. George Dragons club in 1967.

== Post-football & Death ==
Post football he ran his own oil depot contracting for the Esso company. After a battle with heart disease, Clay underwent an unsuccessful heart transplant operation performed by Doctor Victor Chang, Clay died aged 52 on 2 September 1987. He was buried at the Woronora Cemetery, Sutherland, New South Wales. His son Greg Clay took over management of the depot.

In February 2008, Clay was named in the list of Australia's 100 Greatest Players (1908–2007) which was commissioned by the NRL and ARL to celebrate the code's centenary year in Australia. On 20 July 2022, Clay was named in the St. George Dragons District Rugby League Clubs team of the century at five-eighth.

== Sources ==
- Writer, Larry (1995) Never Before, Never Again, Pan MacMillan, Sydney
- Andrews, Malcolm (2006) The ABC of Rugby League Austn Broadcasting Corpn, Sydney
