= George Hugo =

Australian rugby league footballer

Personal information
- Full name: George Hugo

Playing information
- Position: Wing Second-row
Club
Years	Team	Pld	T	G	FG	P
1952–63	Manly-Warringah	99	38	0	0	114
- Source: As of 28 March 2019

George Hugo was an Australian professional rugby league footballer who played in the 1950s and 1960s. He played for Manly-Warringah in the NSWRL competition.

== Playing career ==
Hugo made his first grade debut for Manly-Warringah in 1952. In 1957, Manly reached their second grand final against St George. Hugo played on the wing in the match as St George outclassed Manly to win 31–9. In 1958, Manly made the finals again but failed to reach the grand final.

In 1959, Manly reached their third grand final and once again the opponents were St George. A week earlier in the preliminary final, Hugo scored the winning try for Manly as they defeated Western Suburbs 14–13. Hugo played on the wing in the grand final as St George kept Manly scoreless winning their 4th straight premiership 20–0.

Hugo retired at the end of the 1963 season after 11 seasons at Manly and at the time was one of the club's longest serving players.
