= Martin Gallagher (rugby league) =

Australian rugby league footballer

Personal information
- Full name: Martin Joseph Gallagher
- Born: 7 December 1929 Portland, New South Wales
- Died: 16 June 1990 (aged 60) Dundas, New South Wales

Playing information
- Position: Centre
Club
Years	Team	Pld	T	G	FG	P
1950–51	North Sydney	30	6	5	0	28
1953–58	South Sydney	78	13	1	0	41
1960	Parramatta	10	3	0	0	9
	Total	118	22	6	0	78
Representative
Years	Team	Pld	T	G	FG	P
1954	New South Wales	2	1	0	0	3

Martin Gallagher (7 December 1929 – 16 June 1990) was an Australian rugby league footballer who played in the 1950s and 1960s for North Sydney, South Sydney and Parramatta as a centre. Gallagher is best known for being a member of the Souths sides in the 1950s who won 5 premierships with Gallagher being a part of 3 of those premiership victories.

== Club career ==
Gallagher began his career for North Sydney in 1950 and played two seasons for the club before signing with Souths in 1953. In his first season at Souths, Gallagher was a member of the 1953 premiership winning team defeating St George 31–12. The following year, Gallagher won his second premiership with Souths defeating Newtown 23–15 in the 1954 grand final. In 1955, Gallagher won his third premiership with Souths defeating Newtown again by a score of 12–11 in the grand final. In 1956, Gallagher almost played in his fourth straight grand final as Souths made the preliminary final but were defeated 36-33 by Balmain. The following season, Souths suffered the same fate losing to Manly in the preliminary final 15–11. Gallagher ended his illustrious spell with Souths in 1958 as the club failed to make the finals that year. In 1960, Gallagher joined Parramatta who at the time were perennial cellar dwellers. Gallagher spent only one season with the club as they finished last on the table.

== Death ==
Gallagher was found dead at his Dundas home in 1990. He was believed to have died by suicide.
