= John Dougherty (rugby league) =

Australian rugby league footballer (1931–2025)

Personal information
- Full name: John Patrick Dougherty
- Born: 18 April 1931 Newcastle, New South Wales, Australia
- Died: 27 September 2025 (aged 94)

Playing information
- Position: Five-eighth
Club
Years	Team	Pld	T	G	FG	P
1953–56	South Sydney	57	30	15	0	120
Representative
Years	Team	Pld	T	G	FG	P
1954–56	New South Wales	7	3	0	0	9
1954	NSW City	1	0	0	0	0

John Patrick Dougherty (18 April 1931 – 27 September 2025) was an Australian rugby league footballer who played in the 1950s.

Dougherty died on 27 September 2025, at the age of 94.

== Playing career ==
A schoolboy product from Marist Brothers Hamilton, he played for the South Sydney club in the NSWRFL Premiership.

Dougherty was the Five-eighth and won three grand finals with the team. He scored 32 tries and 72 goals. A Sydney and New South Wales representative, Dougherty was also chosen to play for Australia but was injured forcing him out of that match.
