= Alan Arkey =

Australian rugby league footballer

Personal information
- Full name: Alan Arkey
- Born: 26 March 1931; Sydney, New South Wales, Australia
- Died: 18 June 2006 (aged 75); Sydney, New South Wales, Australia

Playing information
- Position: Fullback
Club
Years	Team	Pld	T	G	FG	P
1951–58	North Sydney	89	1	341	2	689

Alan Arkey (1931−2006) was an Australian rugby league footballer who played in the 1950s. He played in the NSWRFL premiership for North Sydney as a fullback.

== Playing career ==
Arkey began his first grade career in 1951. Arkey was a member of the North's teams in the 1950s where the club made the preliminary finals in 1952 and 1953 but lost to South Sydney and in the semi-finals in 1954 where they lost to St George.

In the 1953 preliminary final, Arkey had a shot at goal nearing full-time from the sideline to send Norths into the grand final but missed his attempt at goal and Souths held on to win the match 5–4.

Arkey retired at the end of the 1958 season and was the record point scorer at the club until he was overtaken by Jason Taylor.

Arkey also jointly holds the record at Norths for most goals kicked in a single match when he kicked 10 goals against Western Suburbs in 1953 and against Eastern Suburbs in 1954.

Arkey later became a life member of the club and died on 18 June 2006.
