= Peter Ryan (rugby league, born 1933) =

Australian rugby league footballer (1933–2025)

Personal information
- Full name: Peter Anthony Ryan
- Born: 3 December 1933 Sydenham, New South Wales, Australia
- Died: 21 September 2025 (aged 91) Sydney, New South Wales, Australia

Playing information
Club
Years	Team	Pld	T	G	FG	P
1953–59	Newtown	110	18	0	0	54
1961–62	Parramatta	14	2	0	0	6
	Total	124	20	0	0	60

Peter Ryan (3 December 1933 – 21 September 2025) was an Australian rugby league footballer who played as a lock in the 1950s and 1960s. He played for the Newtown and Parramatta clubs in the NSWRL premiership.

== Playing career ==
Ryan was born in Sydenham in Sydney, NSW and played his junior rugby league in the Newtown district before being graded by the club in 1953. In 1954, Ryan was part of the Newtown side which claimed the minor premiership and made the grand final against South Sydney. Newtown lost that match 23-15. In 1955, Newtown again claimed the minor premiership and the club qualified for their second consecutive grand final against the same opponent. In the 1955 grand final, Newtown led Souths 8-4 at halftime before Souths came back to win 12-11. This would be Newtown's last grand final for the next 26 years before making the 1981 decider.

Ryan stayed with Newtown until the end of 1959 before leaving to become captain-coach for Mareeba in Far North Queensland. In 1961, Ryan moved back to Sydney and joined the struggling Parramatta and, in his first year, the club finished last on the competition table. In his final year as a player, Parramatta finished 4th on the table and qualified for the finals. Ryan did not feature in the club's 6-0 finals loss to Western Suburbs.

== Death ==
Ryan died in Sydney on 21 September 2025, at the age of 91.
