= Ray Preston (rugby league) =

Australian rugby league footballer (1929–2019)

Personal information
- Full name: Raymond Preston
- Born: 10 November 1929; Sydney, New South Wales, Australia
- Died: 15 November 2019 (aged 90); Penrith, New South Wales

Playing information
- Position: Wing
Club
Years	Team	Pld	T	G	FG	P
1949–56	Newtown	115	107	0	0	321
1958–59	Parramatta	18	8	0	0	24
	Total	133	115	0	0	345
Representative
Years	Team	Pld	T	G	FG	P
1949	NSW City	1	0	0	0	0

Ray Preston (10 November 1929 − 15 November 2019) was an Australian rugby league footballer who played in the 1940s and 1950s. He was one of the game's most prolific try-scorers.

== Playing career ==
He played eight seasons in the New South Wales Rugby Football League premiership for the Newtown club from 1949 to 1956. He played on the wing for the Newtown teams which won the 1954 and 1955 minor premierships, but lost both seasons' grand finals to Souths. During his eight seasons at Newtown, he played in over 100 games and he scored a record 107 tries.

Preston started his career in the Newtown Juniors Lewisham Club. At the end of the 1954 NSWRFL season Preston played for Newtown on the wing in their grand final loss to South Sydney. The 34 tries he scored in the 1954 season made him the competition's leading try scorer, and is also the Newtown club's record for most tries ever in a season. This record has never been bettered. His other winger in 1954, Kevin Considine, scored 22 tries in the same season, and their combined try total of 56 tries from a pair of club wingers is also a record.

Preston was also a professional runner, winning the Hanlon Gift (which was Queensland's largest 'prize money' footrace of the era) in Brisbane in 1957. He played a season at Macksville in 1957 before Sydney's Parramatta signed him for the 1958 NSWRFL season. Preston played two seasons at Parramatta before retiring at the end of 1959.

== Death ==
Preston died at Penrith on 15 November 2019.
