= 1950 NSWRFL season =

Rugby league competition

1950 New South Wales Rugby Football League
- Teams: 10
- Premiers: South Sydney (12th title)
- Minor premiers: South Sydney (11th title)
- Matches played: 93
- Points scored: 2901
- Top points scorer: Bill Keato (180)
- Wooden spoon: North Sydney (7th spoon)
- Top try-scorer: Jack Troy (16)

The 1950 New South Wales Rugby Football League premiership was the forty-third season of Sydney’s top-level rugby league competition, Australia’s first. Ten teams from across the city contested the premiership during the season which culminated in a grand final between South Sydney and Western Suburbs.

== Teams ==
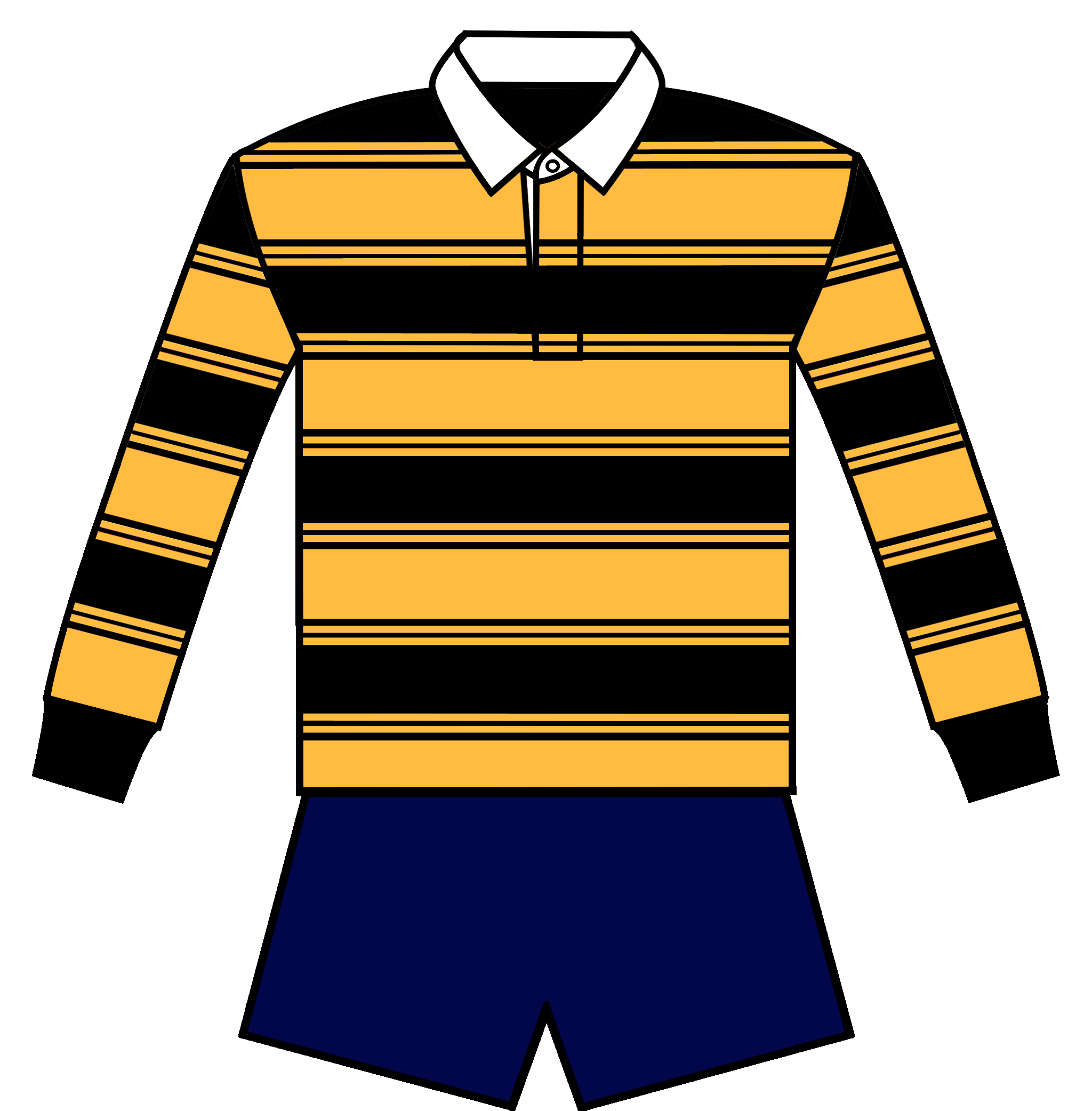
Balmain 43rd season Ground: Leichhardt Oval; Coach: Athol Smith; Captain: Fred de Belin

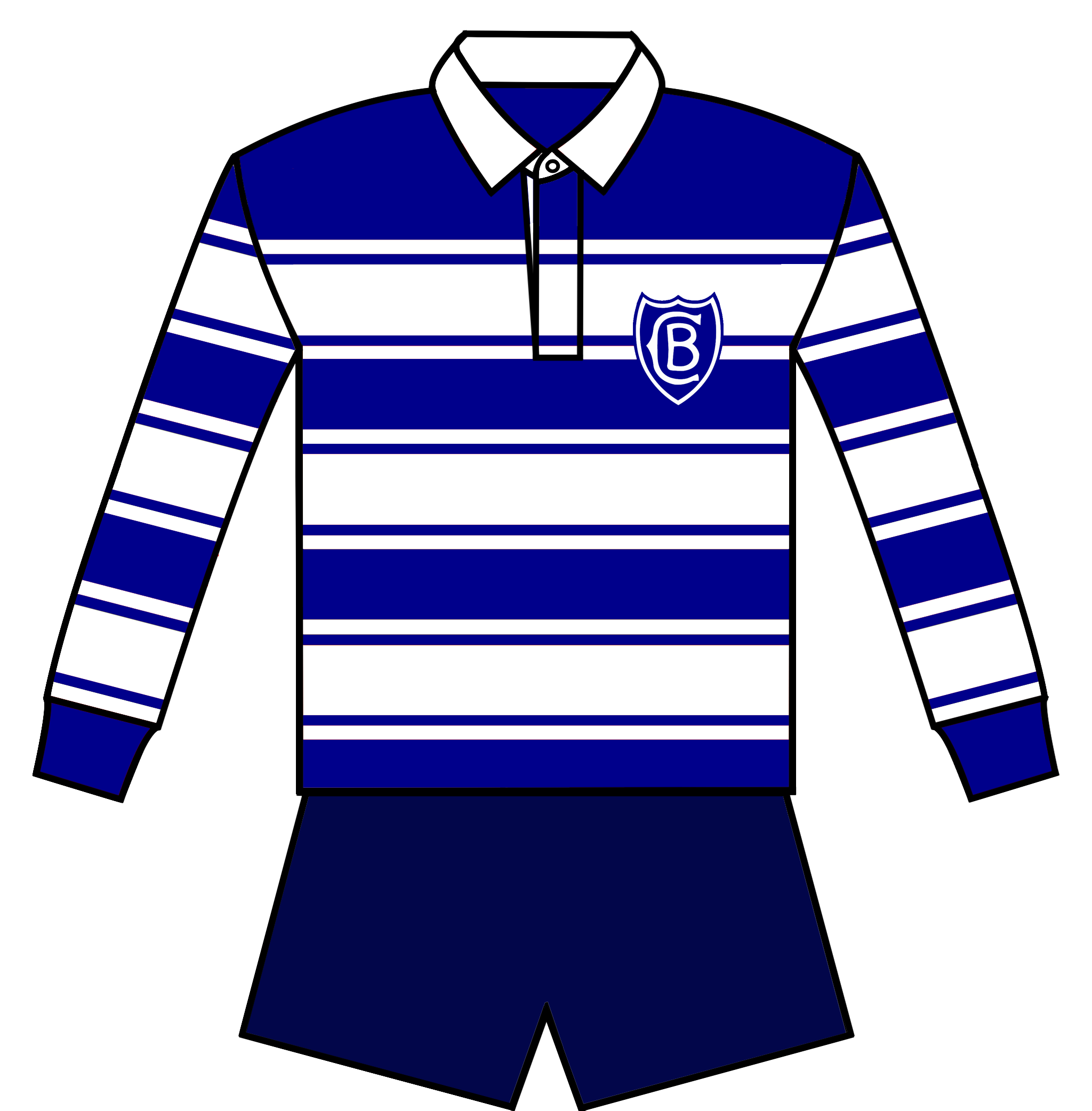
Canterbury-Bankstown 16th season Ground: Belmore Sports Ground; Coach: Alby Why; Captain: Eddie Burns

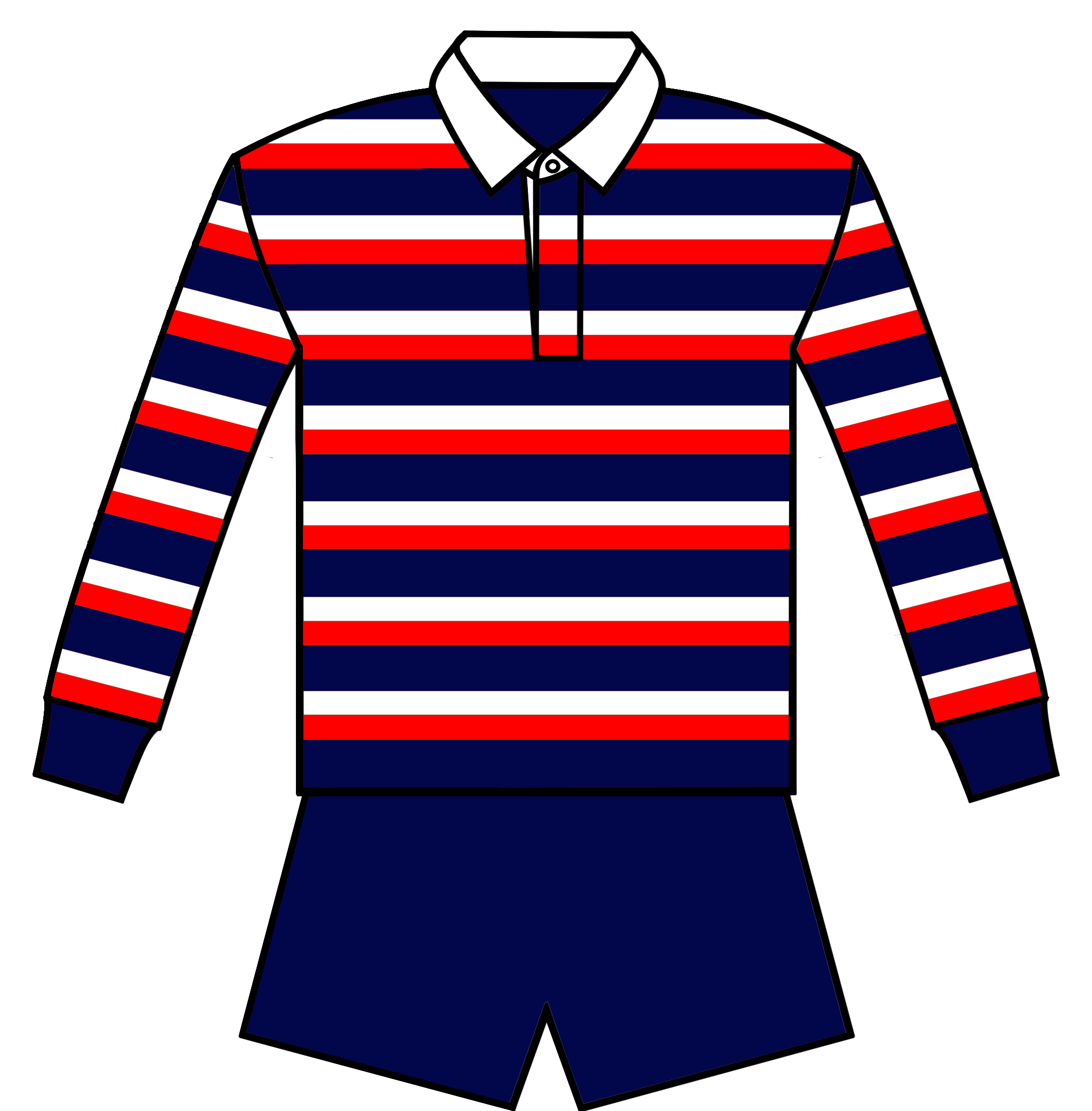
Eastern Suburbs 43rd season Ground: Sydney Sports Ground; Coach: Ernie Norman; Captain: Ferris Ashton

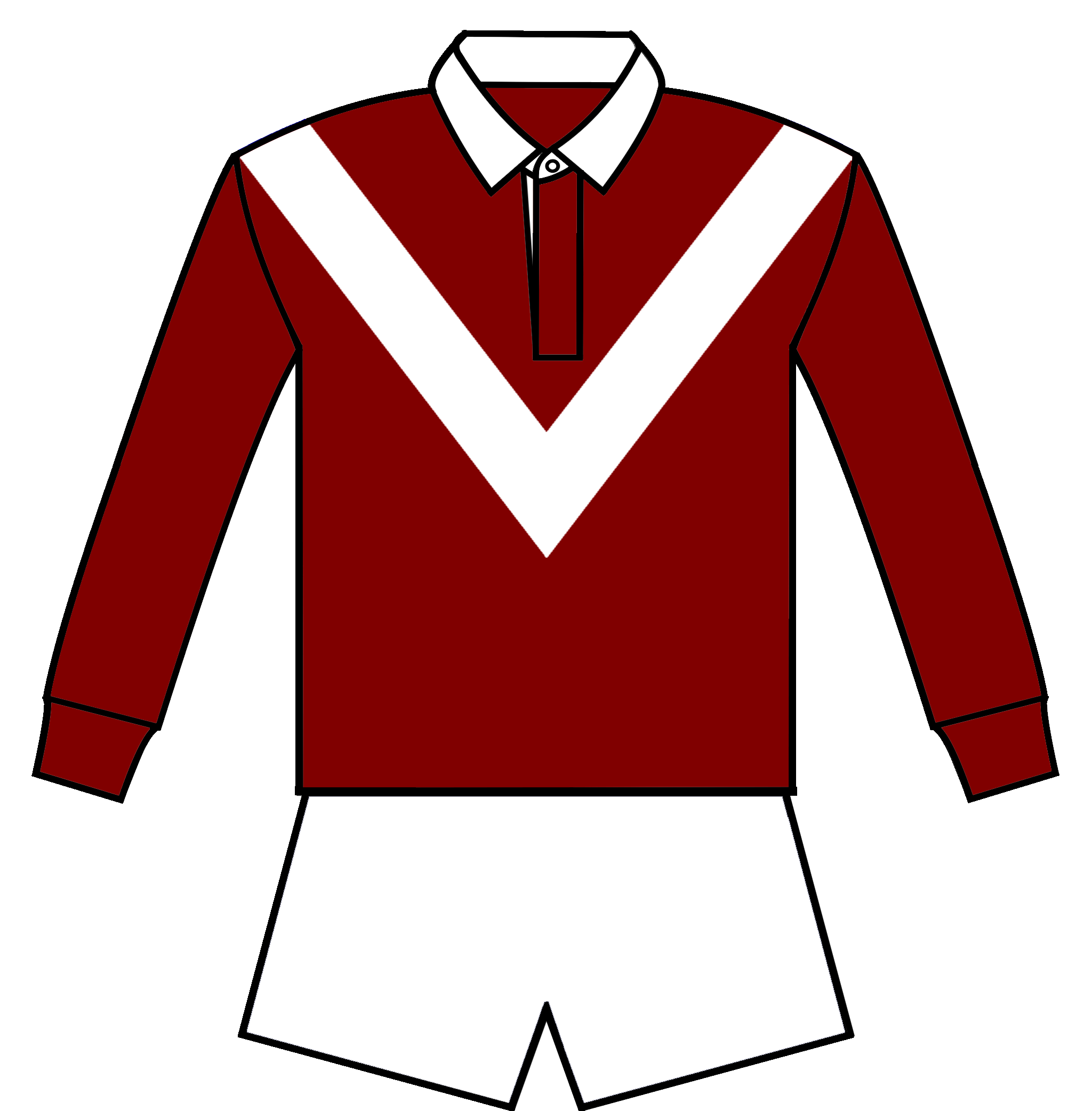
Manly-Warringah 4th season Ground: Brookvale Oval; Coach: Wally O'Connell; Captain: Perce Pritchard

Newtown 43rd season Ground: Erskineville Oval; Captain-Coach: Frank Farrell

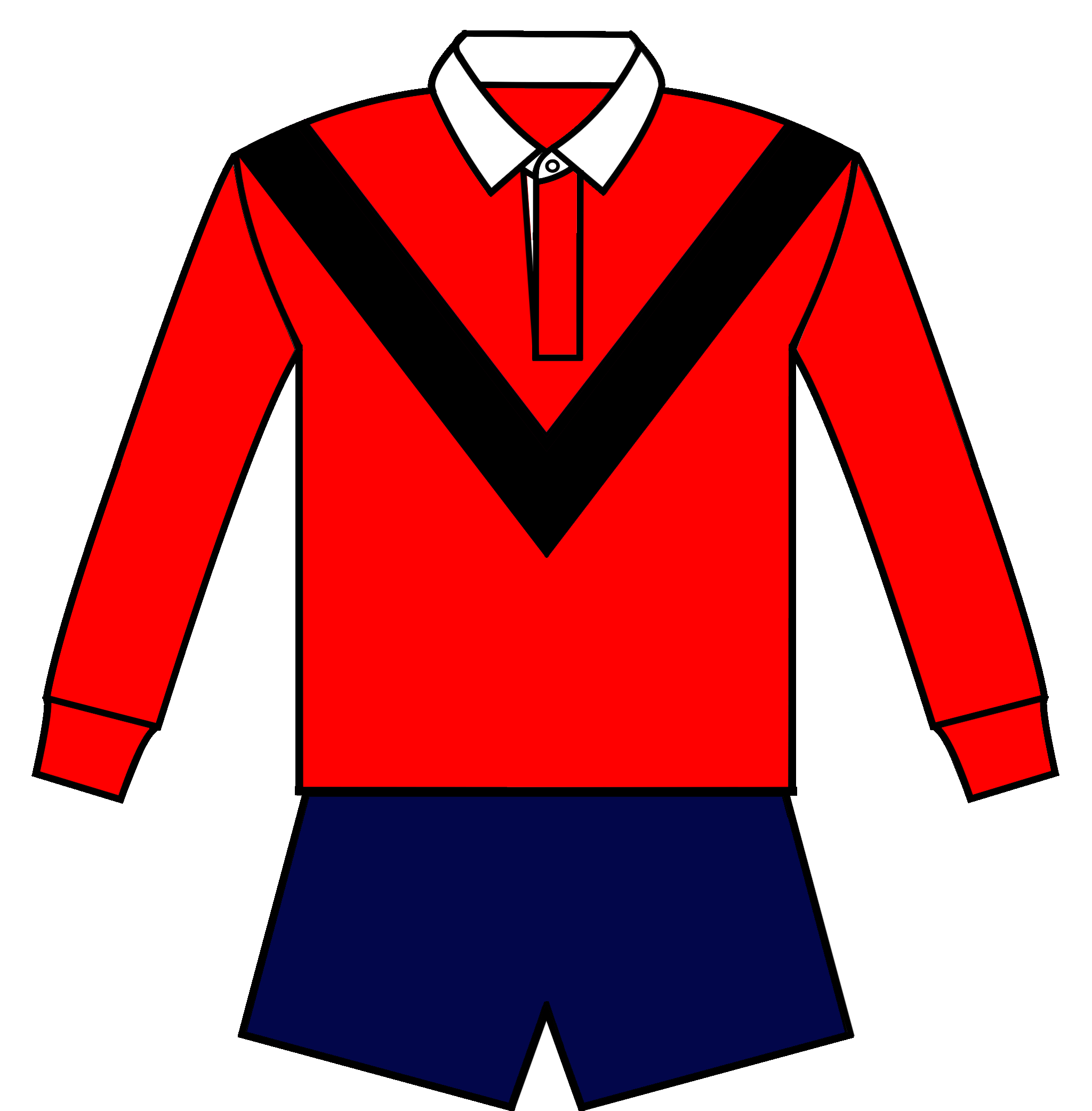
North Sydney 43rd season Ground: North Sydney Oval; Coach: Frank Hyde; Captain: Martin Gallagher

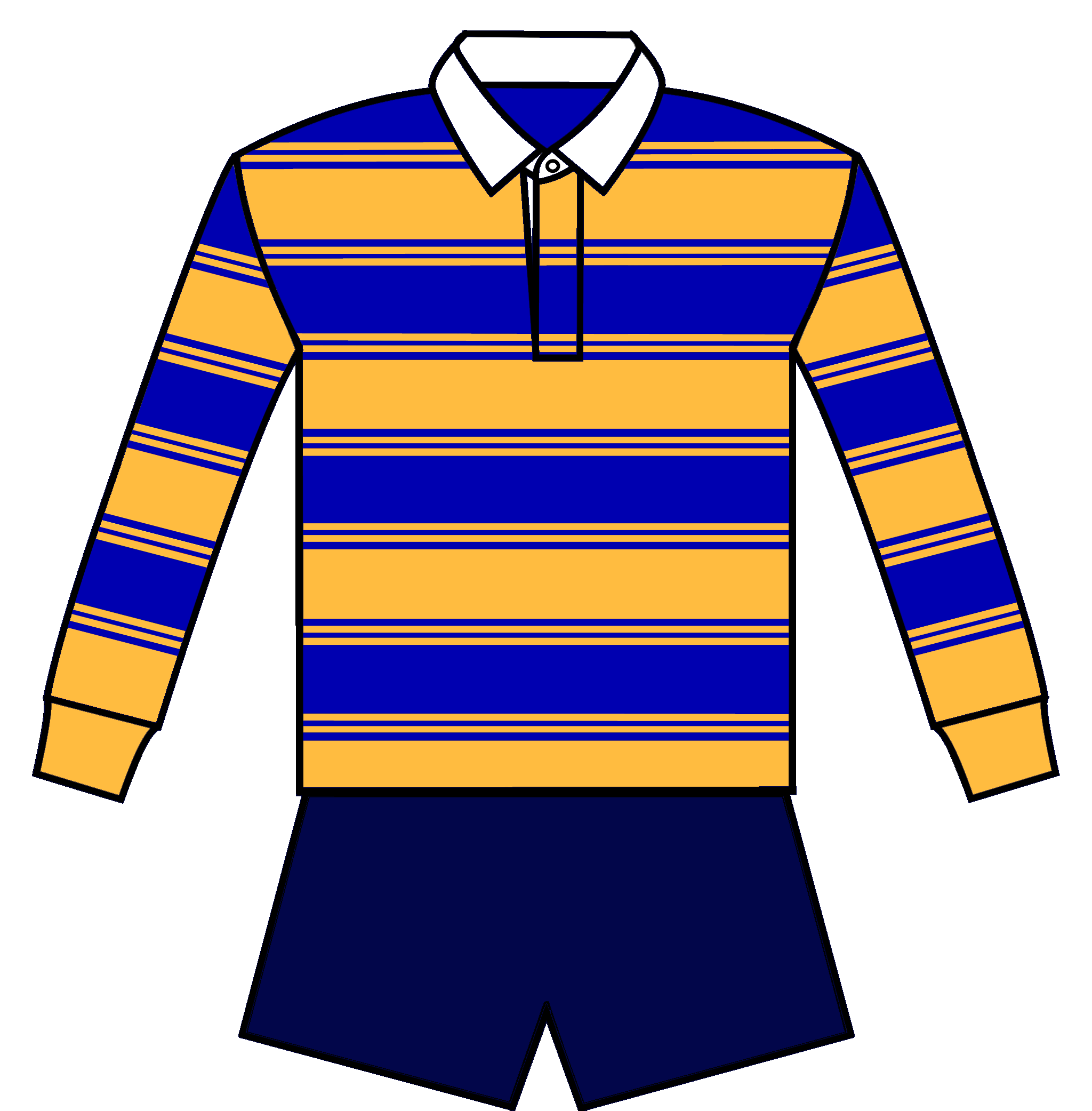
Parramatta 4th season Ground: Cumberland Oval; Coach: Vic Hey; Captain: Bob Hobbs

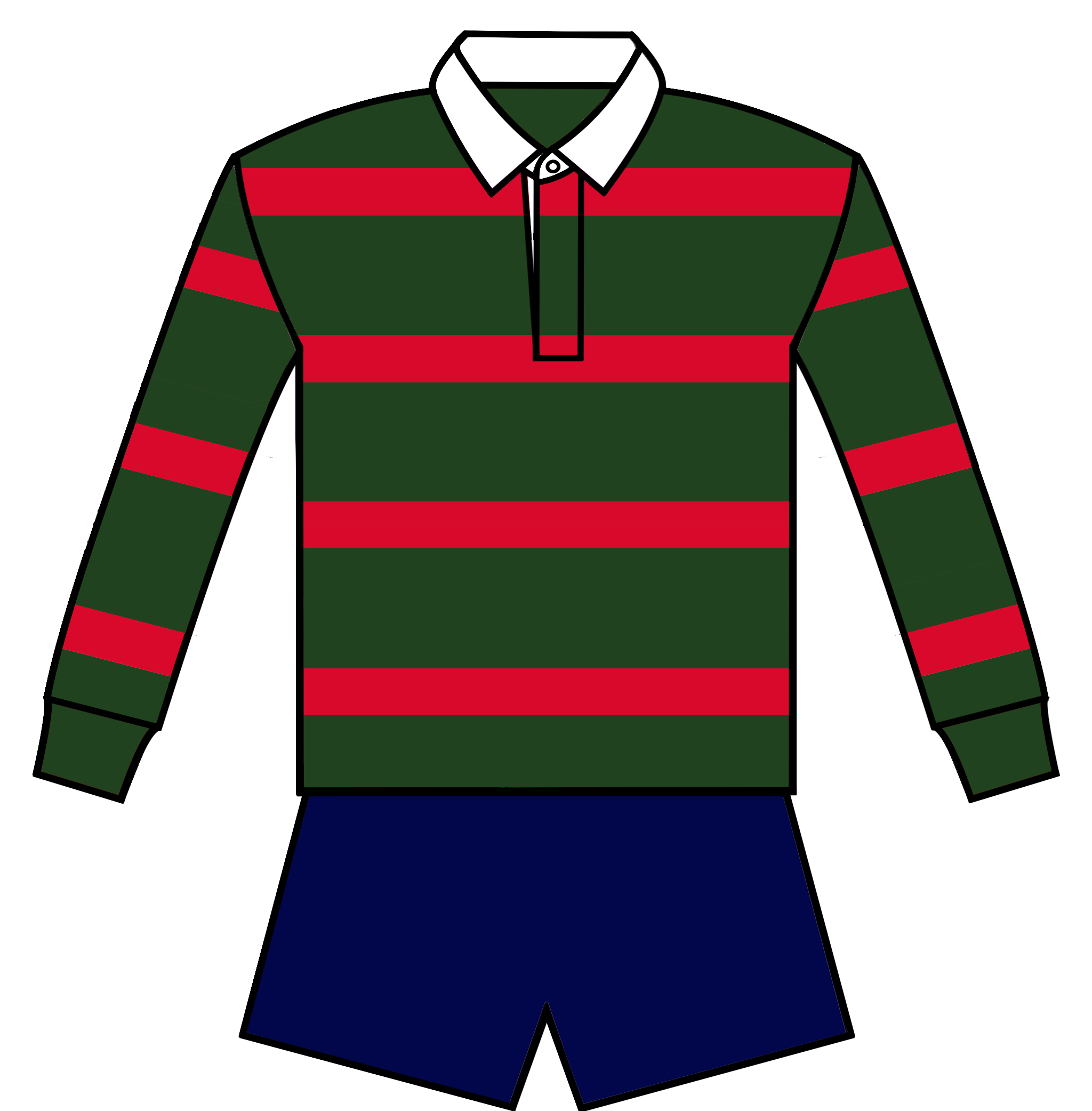
South Sydney 43rd season Ground: Redfern Oval; Captain-Coach: Jack Rayner

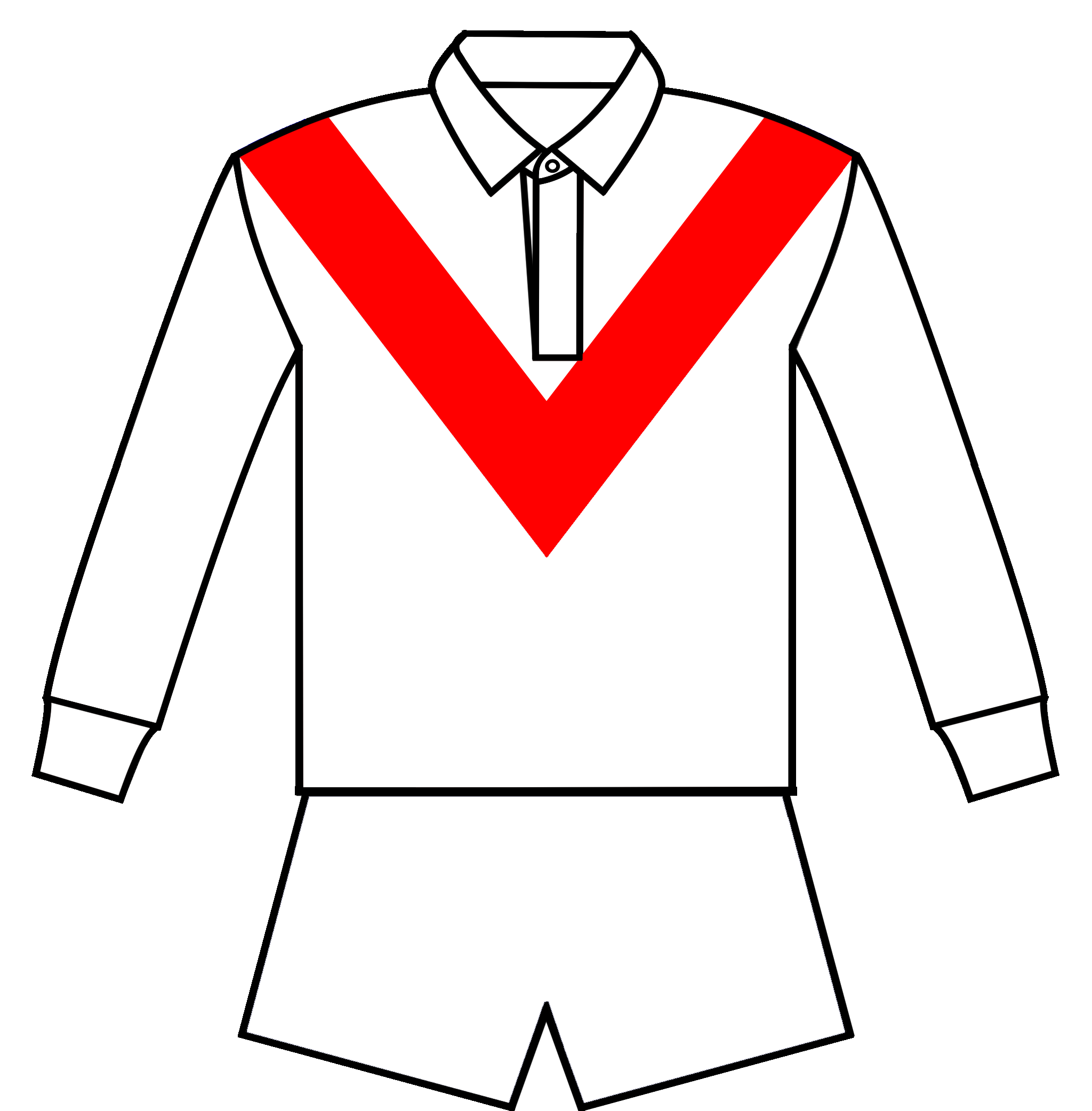
St. George 30th season Ground: Jubilee Oval; Coach: Jim Duckworth; Captain: Johnny Hawke

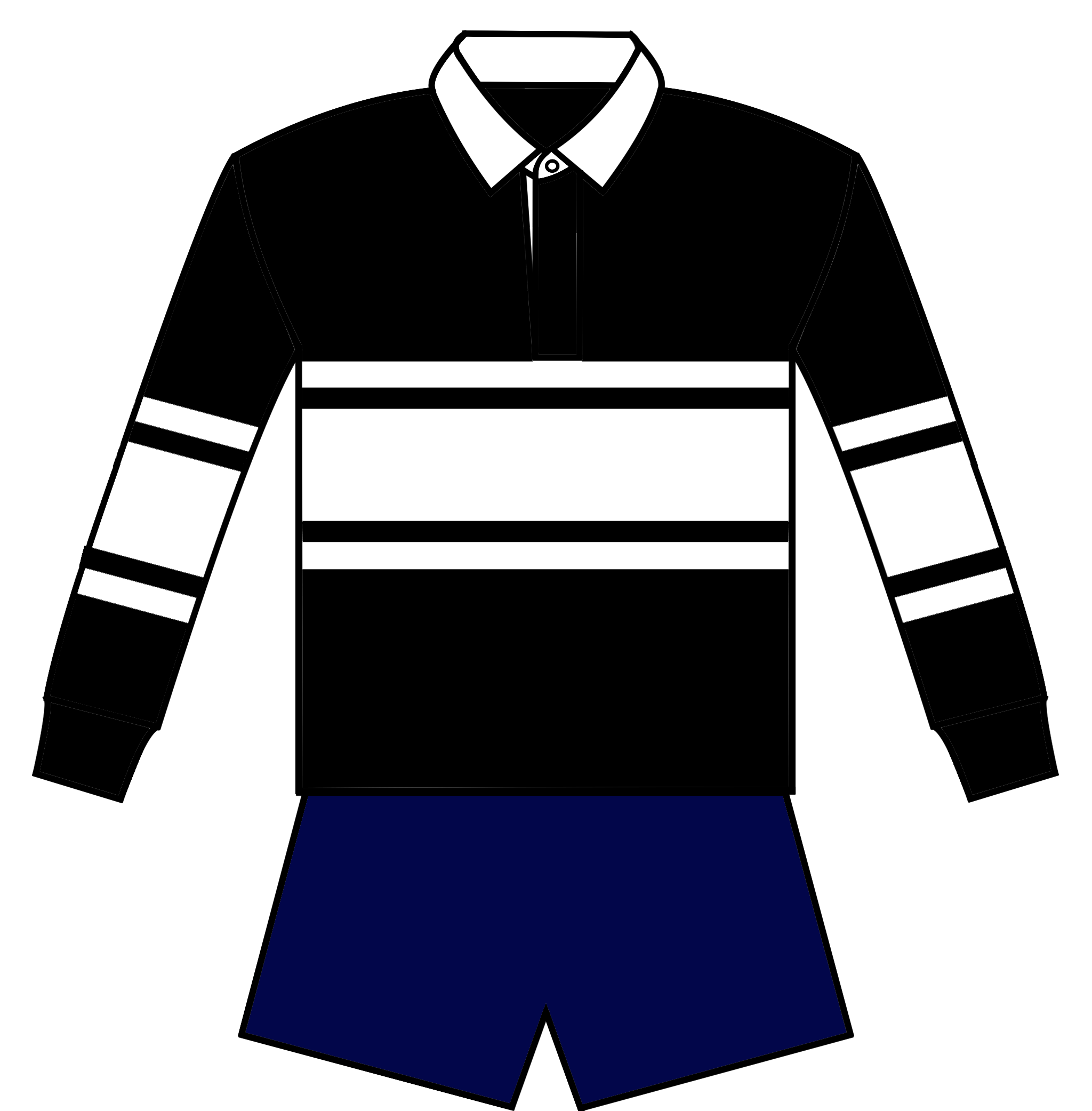
Western Suburbs 43rd season Ground: Pratten Park; Coach: Jeff Smith; Captain: Frank Stanmore

== Ladder ==
	Team	Pld	W	D	L	PF	PA	PD	Pts
1	South Sydney	18	14	0	4	323	228	+95	28
2	Balmain	18	12	2	4	255	208	+47	26
3	Newtown	18	11	2	5	347	269	+78	24
4	Western Suburbs	18	10	2	6	307	259	+48	22
5	St. George	18	9	3	6	336	261	+75	21
6	Canterbury	18	9	0	9	296	277	+19	18
7	Eastern Suburbs	18	7	0	11	237	345	-108	14
8	Manly	18	6	0	12	231	293	-62	12
9	Parramatta	18	3	3	12	203	296	-93	9
10	North Sydney	18	3	0	15	258	357	-99	6

== Finals ==
Home	Score	Away	Match Information
Home	Score	Away	Date and Time	Venue	Referee	Crowd
Semifinals
South Sydney	30–4	Newtown	2 September 1950	Sydney Cricket Ground	George Bishop	33,514
Balmain	10–28	Western Suburbs	9 September 1950	Sydney Sports Ground	Tom McMahon	33,542
Final
South Sydney	21–15	Western Suburbs	16 September 1950	Sydney Sports Ground	Tom McMahon	32,373

=== Final ===
South Sydney	Position	Western Suburbs
13. Clive Churchill	FB	1. William Keato
12. John Graves	WG	22. Jack Wall
11. Kevin Woolfe	CE	20. Dev Dines
10. Milton Atkinson	CE	3. Jack Woods
9. Cliff Smailes	WG	26. John Lackey
26. Greg Hawick	FE	6. Frank Stanmore (c)
8. Bill Stewart	HB	7. Keith Holman
1. Denis Donoghue	PR	57. Don Stait
2. Ernie Hammerton	HK	15. Alan Hornery
18. Ken Macreadie	PR	5. Bill Horder
5. Bernie Purcell	SR	17. Kevin Hansen
4. Jack Rayner (Ca./Co.)	SR	9. Don Milton
6. Les Cowie	LK	8. Peter McLean

In a close and physical encounter South Sydney held a 17–11 six point lead at half time. The second half was tryless, but South Sydney kept ahead on penalty goals throughout.

Souths’ captain Jack Rayner led the team in fine style to their first title in eighteen years while the club's internationals all stood up and were counted. Forward Bernie Purcell kicked five long-range penalty goals in succession; fullback Clive Churchill ran Wests’ heavyweight forwards off their legs and winger Johnny Graves scored two great tries.

South Sydney Rabbitohs 21 (Tries: Graves 2, Smailes. Goals: Purcell 5, Graves 1.)

Western Suburbs Magpies 15 (Tries: Holman. Goals: Keato 6.)

== Player statistics ==
The following statistics are as of the conclusion of Round 18.

Top 5 point scorers

Points	Player	Tries	Goals	Field Goals
152	Bill Keato	2	73	0
124	Joe Jorgenson	4	56	0
116	Noel Pidding	6	49	0
111	Darcy Russell	1	54	0
106	Bernie Purcell	8	41	0

Top 5 try scorers

Tries	Player
16	Jack Troy
13	Ron Roberts
12	Bobby Lulham
12	Mitchell Wallace
12	Peter O'Brien

Top 5 goal scorers

Goals	Player
73	Bill Keato
56	Joe Jorgenson
54	Darcy Russell
49	Noel Pidding
47	Ron Willey
