= 1952 NSWRFL season =

Rugby league competition

1952 New South Wales Rugby Football League
- Teams: 10
- Premiers: Western Suburbs (4th title)
- Minor premiers: Western Suburbs (3rd title)
- Matches played: 95
- Points scored: 3217
- Top points scorer: Ron Rowles (178)
- Wooden spoon: Parramatta (2nd spoon)
- Top try-scorer: Peter O'Brien (20)

The 1952 New South Wales Rugby Football League premiership was the forty-fifth season of the rugby league competition based in Sydney. Ten teams from across Sydney contested for the J. J. Giltinan Shield during the season which culminated in a grand final between Western Suburbs and South Sydney.

== Teams ==
The tail-end of the season was played without star players selected to go on the Australian national team’s 1952–1953 Kangaroo Tour.

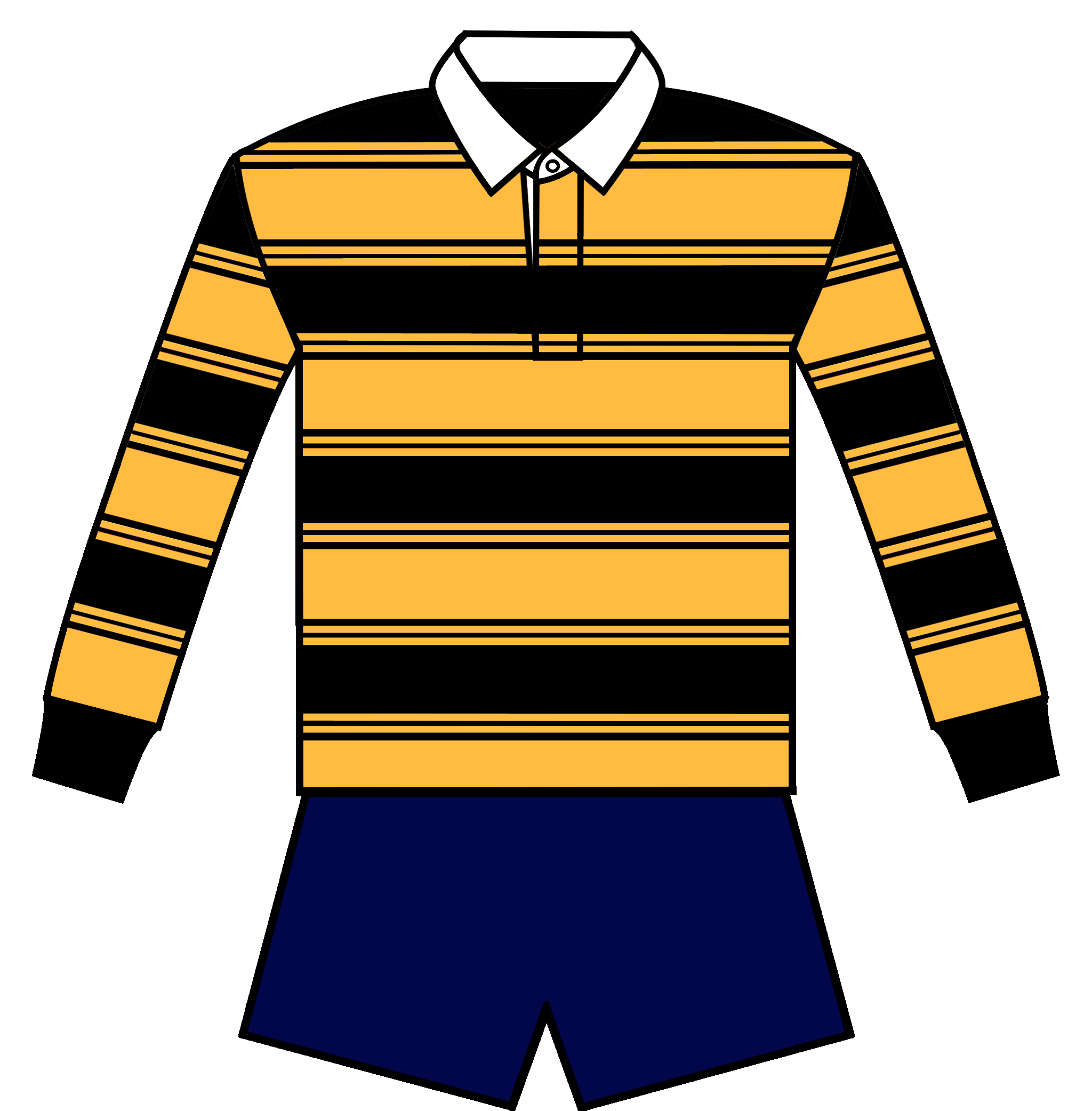
Balmain 45th season Ground: Leichhardt Oval; Coach: Arthur Patton; Captain: Stan Ponchard

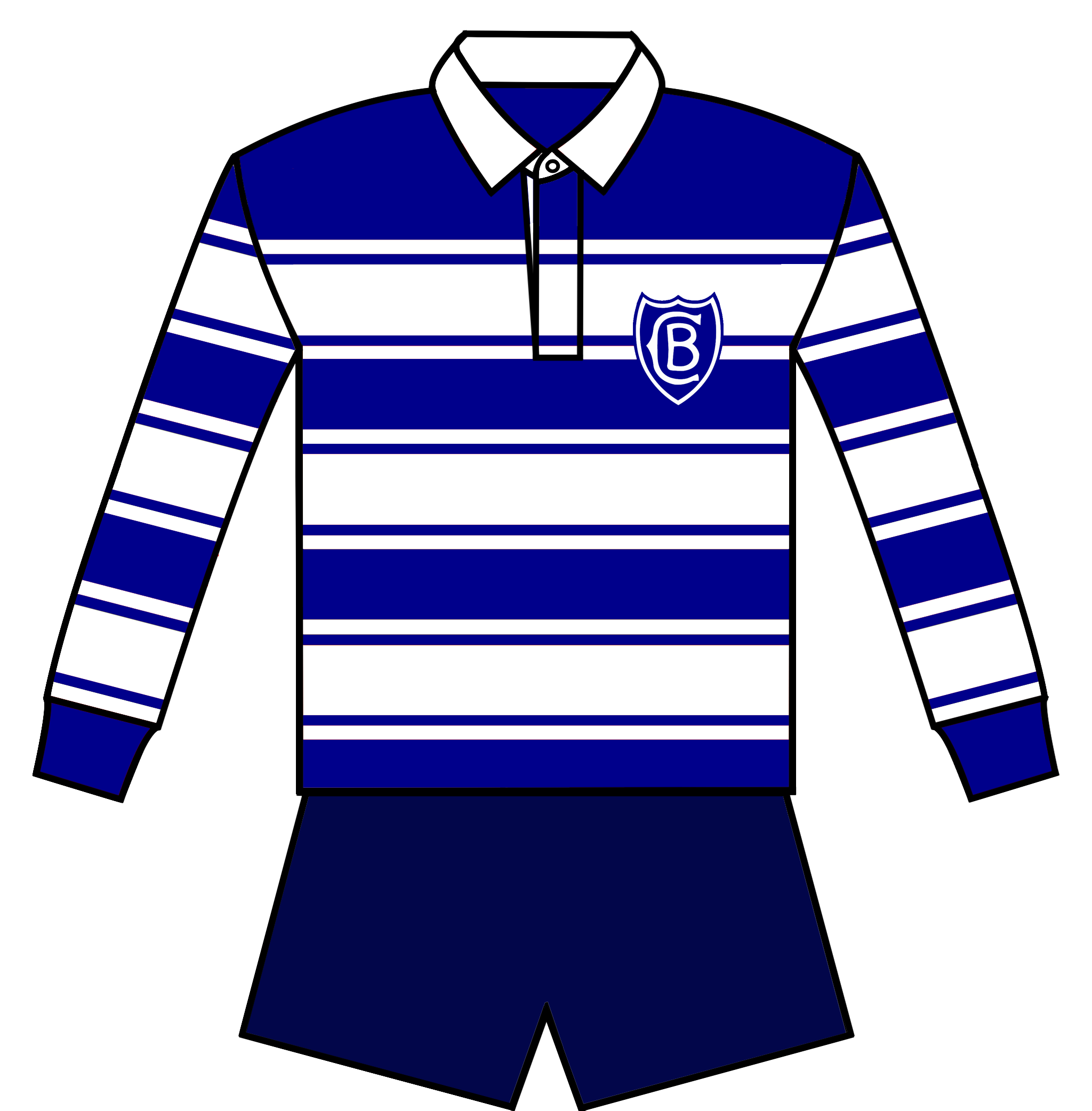
Canterbury-Bankstown 18th season Ground: Belmore Oval; Coach: Alby Why; Captain: Ken Charlton

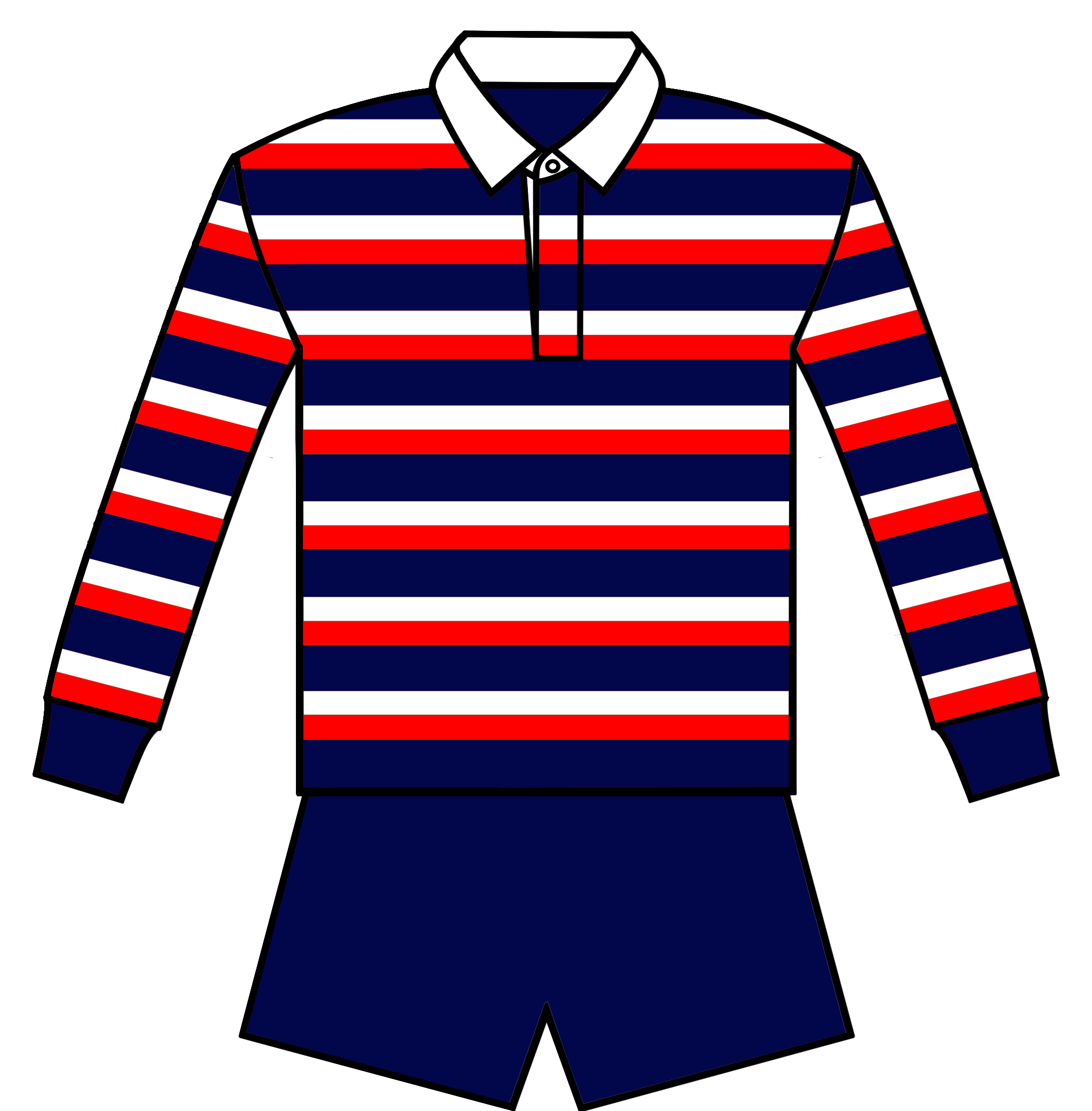
Eastern Suburbs 45th season Ground: Sydney Sports Ground; Coach: Ernie Norman; Captain: Ferris Ashton

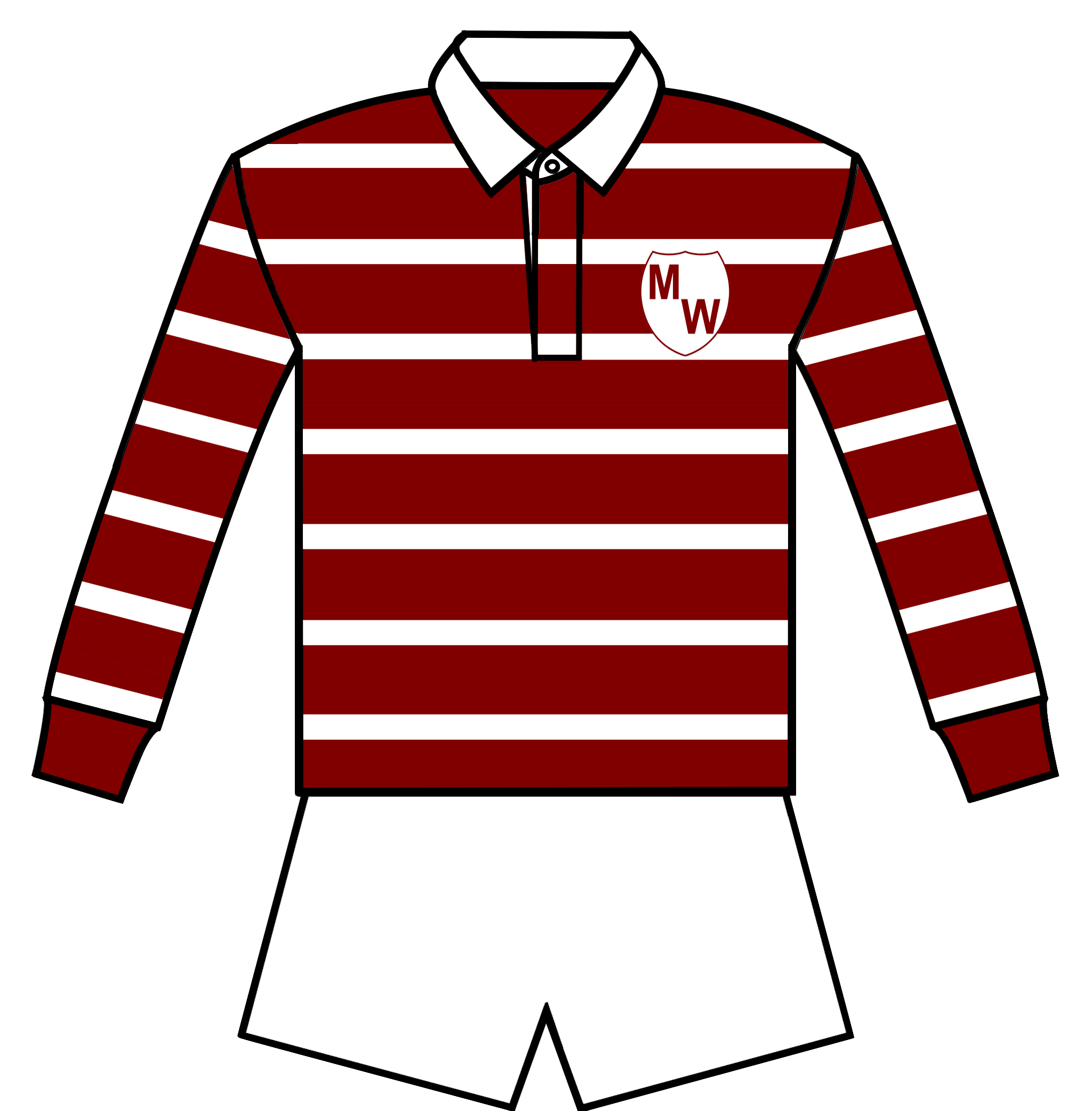
Manly-Warringah 6th season Ground: Brookvale Oval; Captain-Coach: Wally O'Connell

Newtown 45th season Ground: Erskineville Oval; Coach: Frank Johnson; Captain: Gordon Clifford

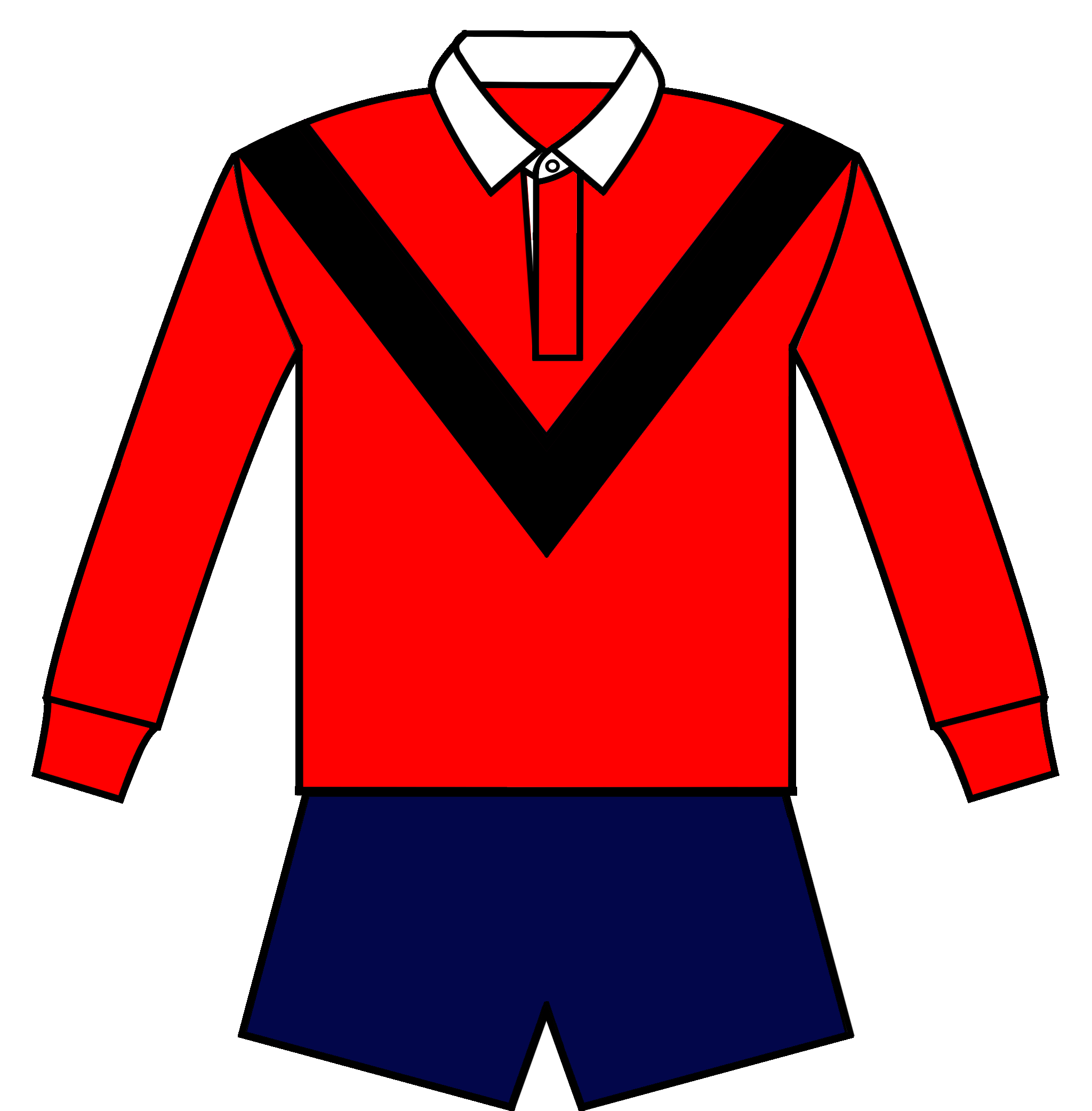
North Sydney 45th season Ground: North Sydney Oval; Coach: Ross McKinnon; Captain: Bob Sullivan

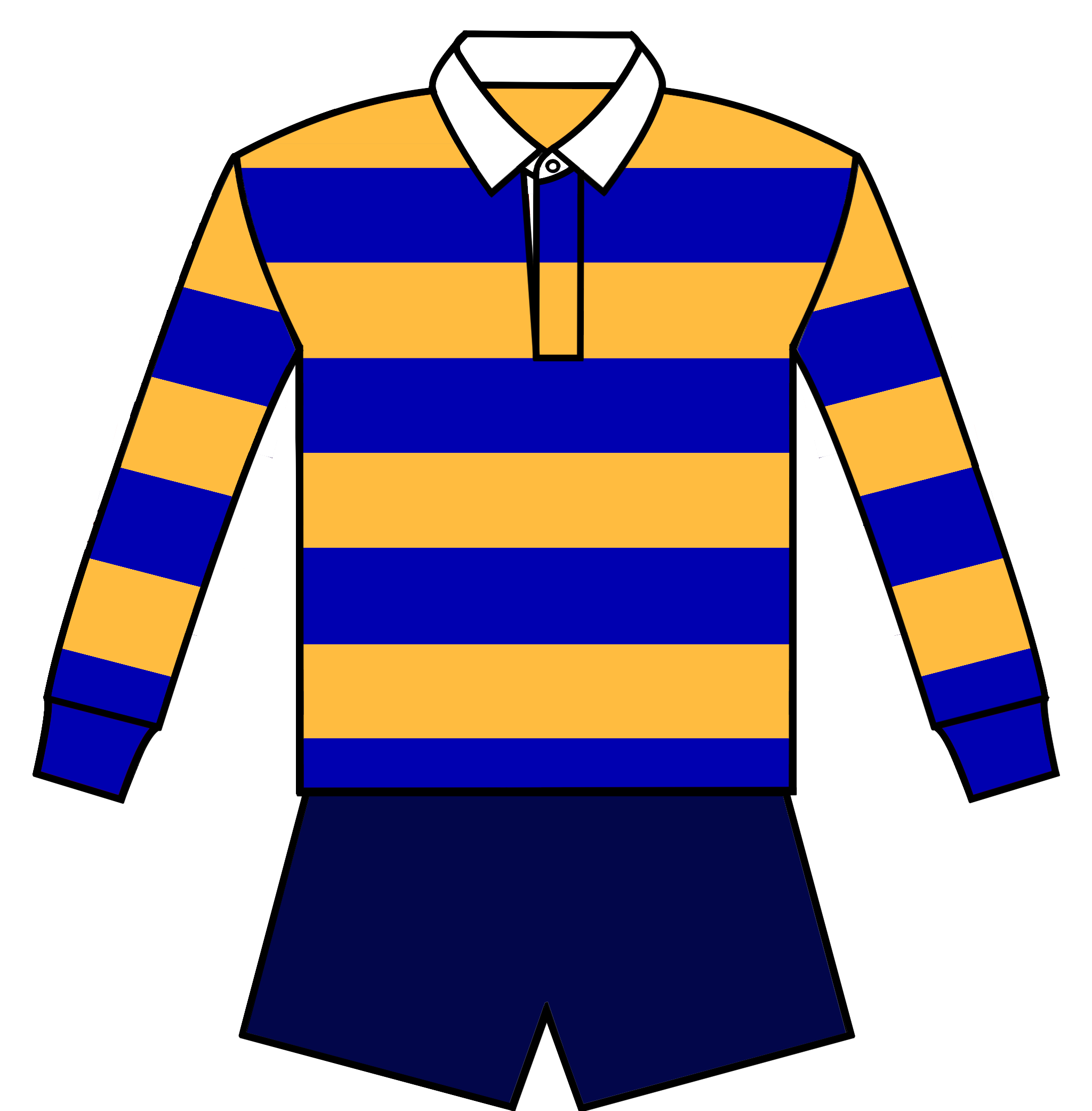
Parramatta 6th season Ground: Cumberland Oval; Coach: Vic Hey; Captain: Ian Johnston

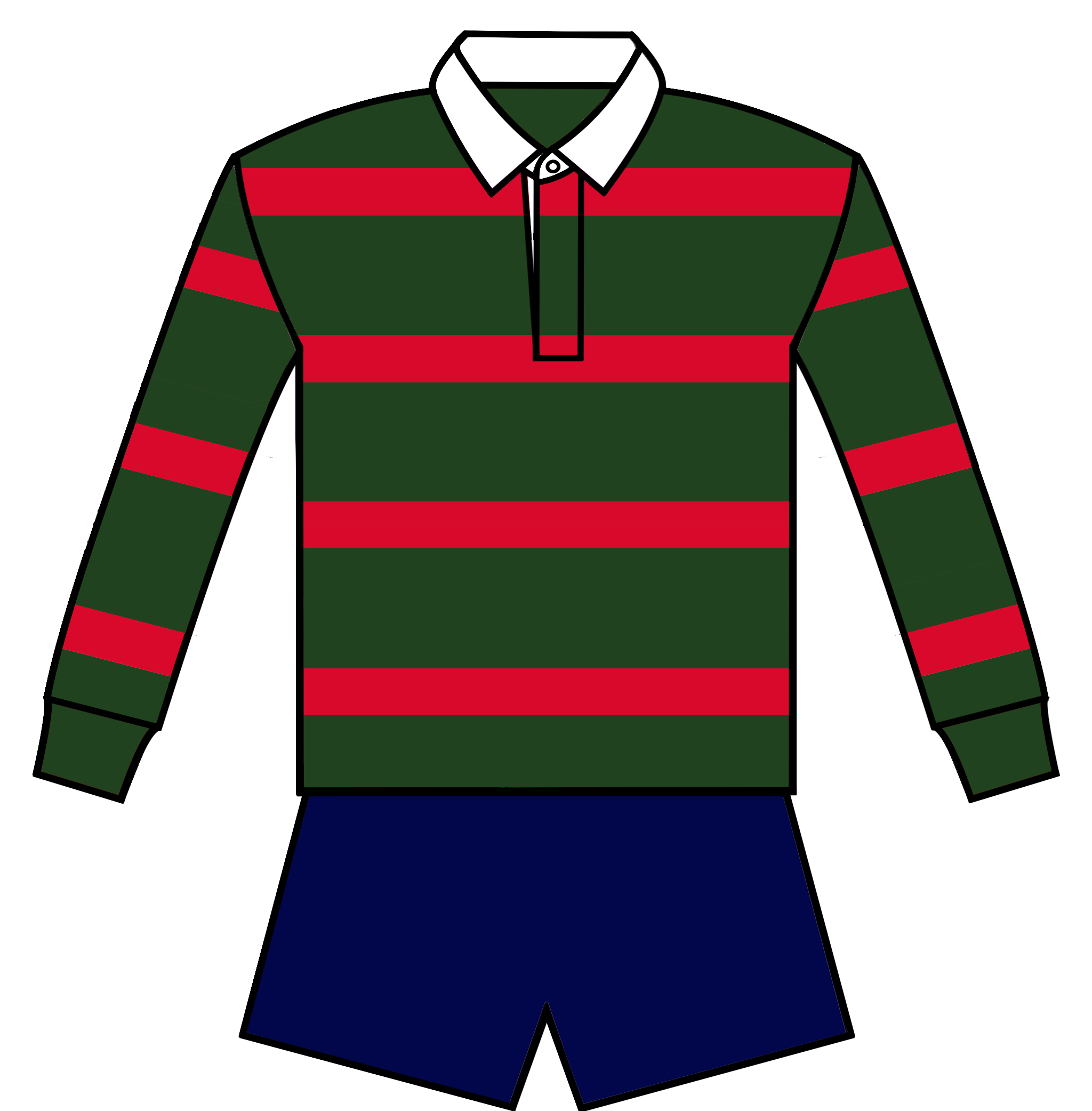
South Sydney 45th season Ground: Redfern Oval; Captain-Coach: Jack Rayner

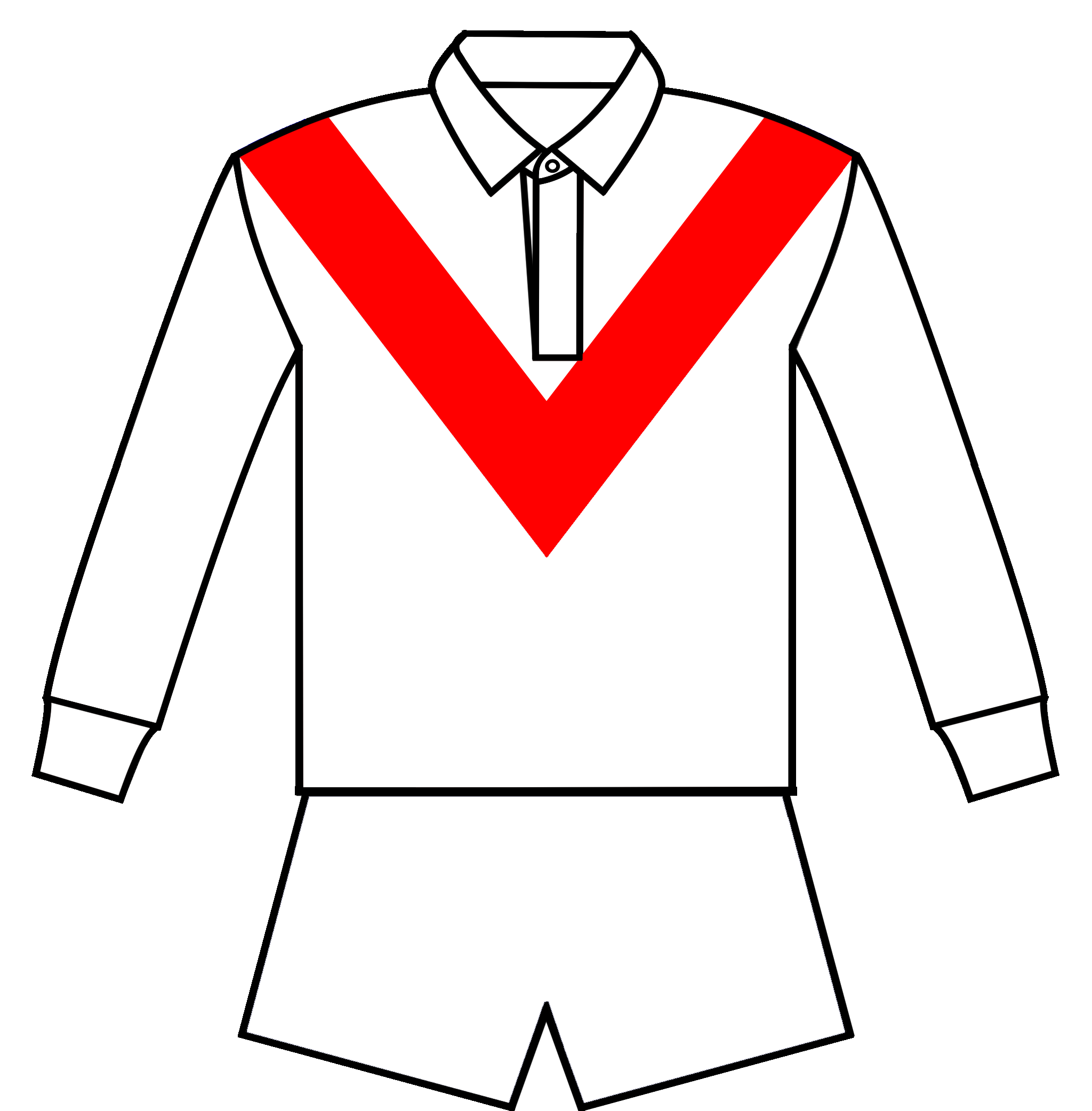
St. George 32nd season Ground: Jubilee Oval; Captain-coach: Johnny Hawke

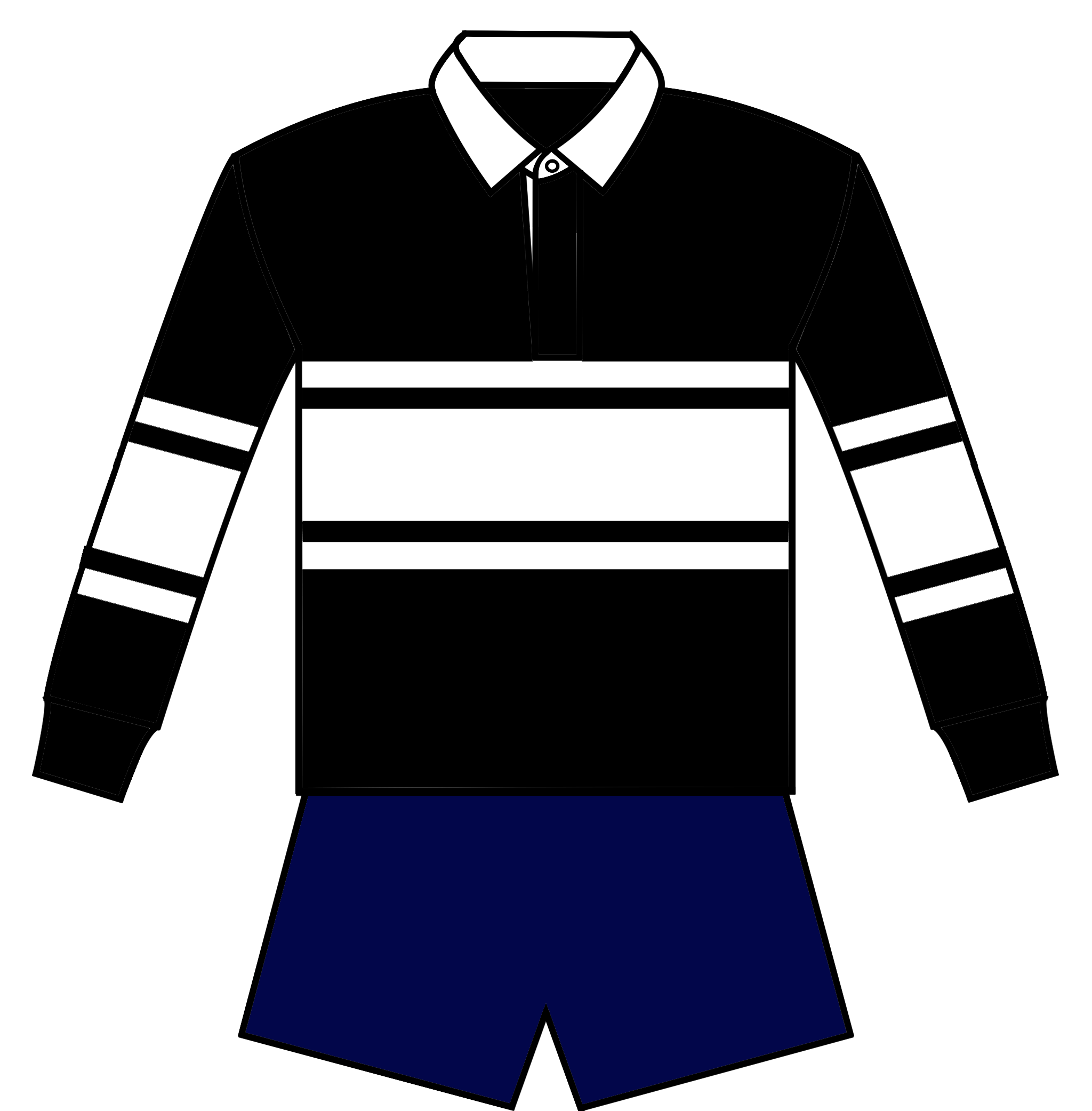
Western Suburbs 45th season Ground: Pratten Park; Coach: Tom McMahon; Captain: Peter McLean

== Regular season ==
| Team | 1 | 2 | 3 | 4 | 5 | 6 | 7 | 8 | 9 | 10 | 11 | 12 | 13 | 14 | 15 | 16 | 17 | 18 | F1 | F2 | F3 | F4 | GF |
|---|---|---|---|---|---|---|---|---|---|---|---|---|---|---|---|---|---|---|---|---|---|---|---|
| Balmain | CBY −1 | **STG** **−11** | WES −9 | **SOU** **−3** | **NEW** **−1** | EAS −10 | **MAN** **−10** | PAR +6 | NOR +7 | **CBY** **+25** | STG +16 | **WES** **−2** | SOU +2 | NEW +30 | MAN −2 | **PAR** **−1** | **NOR** **+8** | **EAS** **+51** | | | | | |
| Canterbury-Bankstown | **BAL** **+1** | NEW +1 | EAS −5 | MAN −23 | **PAR** **+8** | NOR −21 | SOU −22 | STG −17 | **WES** **−2** | BAL −25 | **NEW** **−11** | EAS +2 | **MAN** **−8** | PAR +2 | **SOU** **−12** | **STG** **−6** | WES; 0 | NOR −34 | | | | | |
| Eastern Suburbs | PAR +10 | **NOR** **+2** | **CBY** **+5** | **STG** **−4** | WES −3 | **BAL** **+10** | NEW −1 | **SOU** **−50** | MAN −4 | **PAR** **−16** | NOR −24 | **CBY** **−2** | STG −11 | WES −12 | **NEW** **+20** | SOU −8 | **MAN** **+1** | BAL −51 | | | | | |
| Manly-Warringah | SOU +3 | **PAR** **+17** | NOR +3 | **CBY** **+23** | STG +17 | WES −1 | BAL +10 | **NEW** **+20** | **EAS** **+4** | SOU −5 | PAR +6 | NOR −13 | CBY +8 | STG −3 | **BAL** **+2** | NEW −8 | EAS −1 | WES −9 | NOR −28 | | | | |
| Newtown | **NOR** **−5** | **CBY** **−1** | STG −16 | **WES** **−1** | BAL +1 | SOU −4 | **EAS** **+1** | MAN −20 | **PAR** **+13** | NOR −4 | CBY +11 | **STG** **−24** | WES −10 | **BAL** **−30** | EAS −20 | **MAN** **+8** | PAR +9 | SOU −39 | | | | | |
| North Sydney | NEW +5 | EAS −2 | **MAN** **−3** | PAR +32 | **SOU** **+3** | **CBY** **+21** | **STG** **+22** | WES −20 | **BAL** **−7** | **NEW** **+4** | **EAS** **+24** | **MAN** **+13** | **PAR** **+22** | SOU −6 | **STG** **−4** | **WES** **+5** | BAL −8 | **CBY** **+34** | **MAN** **+28** | X | STG +12 | SOU −14 | |
| Parramatta | **EAS** **−10** | MAN −17 | SOU −20 | **NOR** **−32** | CBY −8 | **STG** **−12** | WES −18 | **BAL** **−6** | NEW −13 | EAS +16 | **MAN** **−6** | **SOU** **+6** | NOR −22 | **CBY** **−2** | **WES** **−4** | BAL +1 | **NEW** **−9** | STG −26 | | | | | |
| South Sydney | **MAN** **−3** | **WES** **−2** | **PAR** **+20** | BAL +3 | NOR −3 | **NEW** **+4** | **CBY** **+22** | EAS +50 | STG +2 | **MAN** **+5** | WES +5 | PAR −6 | **BAL** **−2** | **NOR** **+6** | CBY +12 | **EAS** **+8** | **STG** **−5** | **NEW** **+39** | X | WES +8 | X | **NOR** **+14** | WES −10 |
| St. George | **WES** **−1** | BAL +11 | **NEW** **+16** | EAS +4 | **MAN** **−17** | PAR +12 | NOR −22 | **CBY** **+17** | **SOU** **−2** | WES +17 | **BAL** **−16** | NEW +24 | **EAS** **+11** | **MAN** **+3** | NOR +4 | CBY +6 | SOU +5 | **PAR** **+26** | X | X | **NOR** **−12** | | |
| Western Suburbs | STG +1 | SOU +2 | **BAL** **+9** | NEW +1 | **EAS** **+3** | **MAN** **+1** | **PAR** **+18** | **NOR** **+20** | CBY +2 | **STG** **−17** | **SOU** **−5** | BAL +2 | **NEW** **+10** | **EAS** **+12** | PAR +4 | NOR −5 | **CBY**; **0** | **MAN** **+9** | X | **SOU** **−8** | X | X | **SOU** **+10** |
| Team | 1 | 2 | 3 | 4 | 5 | 6 | 7 | 8 | 9 | 10 | 11 | 12 | 13 | 14 | 15 | 16 | 17 | 18 | F1 | F2 | F3 | F4 | GF |

Bold – Home game
X – Bye
Opponent for round listed above margin

== Ladder ==
| | Team | Pld | W | D | L | PF | PA | PD | Pts |
|---|---|---|---|---|---|---|---|---|---|
| 1 | Western Suburbs | 18 | 14 | 1 | 3 | 331 | 264 | +67 | 29 |
| 2 | St. George | 18 | 13 | 0 | 5 | 375 | 279 | +96 | 26 |
| 3 | South Sydney | 18 | 12 | 0 | 6 | 344 | 189 | +155 | 24 |
| 4 | North Sydney | 18 | 11 | 0 | 7 | 384 | 247 | +137 | 22 |
| 5 | Manly | 18 | 11 | 0 | 7 | 334 | 261 | +73 | 22 |
| 6 | Balmain | 18 | 8 | 0 | 10 | 351 | 256 | +95 | 16 |
| 7 | Newtown | 18 | 6 | 0 | 12 | 210 | 341 | -131 | 12 |
| 8 | Eastern Suburbs | 18 | 6 | 0 | 12 | 259 | 397 | -138 | 12 |
| 9 | Canterbury | 18 | 5 | 1 | 12 | 214 | 386 | -172 | 11 |
| 10 | Parramatta | 18 | 3 | 0 | 15 | 241 | 423 | -182 | 6 |

=== Ladder progression ===
- Numbers highlighted in green indicate that the team finished the round inside the top 4.
- Numbers highlighted in blue indicates the team finished first on the ladder in that round.
- Numbers highlighted in red indicates the team finished last place on the ladder in that round.

| | Team | 1 | 2 | 3 | 4 | 5 | 6 | 7 | 8 | 9 | 10 | 11 | 12 | 13 | 14 | 15 | 16 | 17 | 18 |
|---|---|---|---|---|---|---|---|---|---|---|---|---|---|---|---|---|---|---|---|
| 1 | Western Suburbs | 2 | 4 | 6 | 8 | 10 | 12 | 14 | 16 | 18 | 18 | 18 | 20 | 22 | 24 | 26 | 26 | 27 | 29 |
| 2 | St. George | 0 | 2 | 4 | 6 | 6 | 8 | 8 | 10 | 10 | 12 | 12 | 14 | 16 | 18 | 20 | 22 | 24 | 26 |
| 3 | South Sydney | 0 | 0 | 2 | 4 | 4 | 6 | 8 | 10 | 12 | 14 | 16 | 16 | 16 | 18 | 20 | 22 | 22 | 24 |
| 4 | North Sydney | 2 | 2 | 2 | 4 | 6 | 8 | 10 | 10 | 10 | 12 | 14 | 16 | 18 | 18 | 18 | 20 | 20 | 22 |
| 5 | Manly-Warringah | 2 | 4 | 6 | 8 | 10 | 10 | 12 | 14 | 16 | 16 | 18 | 18 | 20 | 20 | 22 | 22 | 22 | 22 |
| 6 | Balmain | 0 | 0 | 0 | 0 | 0 | 0 | 0 | 2 | 4 | 6 | 8 | 8 | 10 | 12 | 12 | 12 | 14 | 16 |
| 7 | Newtown | 0 | 0 | 0 | 0 | 2 | 2 | 4 | 4 | 6 | 6 | 8 | 8 | 8 | 8 | 8 | 10 | 12 | 12 |
| 8 | Eastern Suburbs | 2 | 4 | 6 | 6 | 6 | 8 | 8 | 8 | 8 | 8 | 8 | 8 | 8 | 8 | 10 | 10 | 12 | 12 |
| 9 | Canterbury-Bankstown | 2 | 4 | 4 | 4 | 6 | 6 | 6 | 6 | 6 | 6 | 6 | 8 | 8 | 10 | 10 | 10 | 11 | 11 |
| 10 | Parramatta | 0 | 0 | 0 | 0 | 0 | 0 | 0 | 0 | 0 | 2 | 2 | 4 | 4 | 4 | 4 | 6 | 6 | 6 |

== Finals ==
The 1952 season saw North Sydney reach the finals for the first time since 1943. Their win over St. George in their semi-final would prove North Sydney’s last victory in a first grade semi-final until their 1991 major preliminary semi-final against Manly-Warringah.

| Home | Score | Away | Match Information |
| Home | Score | Away | Date and Time | Venue | Referee | Crowd |
|---|---|---|---|---|---|---|
Playoff
| North Sydney | 36–8 | Manly-Warringah | 27 August 1952 | Sydney Cricket Ground | | 8,770 |
Semifinals
| Western Suburbs | 10–18 | South Sydney | 30 August 1952 | Sydney Cricket Ground | Jack O'Brien | 34,181 |
| St. George | 9–21 | North Sydney | 6 September 1952 | Sydney Cricket Ground | George Bishop | 41,976 |
Preliminary Final
| South Sydney | 26–12 | North Sydney | 13 September 1952 | Sydney Cricket Ground | Jack O'Brien | 44,166 |
Grand Final
| Western Suburbs | 22–12 | South Sydney | 20 September 1952 | Sydney Cricket Ground | George Bishop | 41,060 |

=== Grand Final ===
| Western Suburbs | Position | South Sydney |
|---|---|---|
| 16. George Bain | FB | 13. Don Murdoch |
| 2. Bill Callinan | WG | 12. John Graves |
| 3. Col Ratcliff | CE | 11. Frank Threlfo |
| 4. Gerry Lowe | CE | 10. Malcolm Spencer |
| 5. Jack Fitzgerald | WG | 9. Cliff Smailes |
| 24. Dev Dines | FE | 8. Norm Spillane |
| 16. Leo Trevena | HB | 7. Ken Brogan |
| 13. Kevin Hansen | PR | 1. Denis Donoghue |
| 51. Hec Farrell | HK | 2. Ernie Hammerton |
| 11. Bill Horder | PR | 3. Bryan Orrock |
| 9. Don Schofield | SR | 5. Ken Macreadie |
| 22. Ron Watson | SR | 4. Jack Rayner (Ca./Co.) |
| 8. Peter McLean (c) | LK | 6. Ray Neilson |
| Tom McMahon | Coach | |

The rl1908 reference transcribes Sean Fagan’s 2002 interview with Souths captain-coach Jack Rayner fuelling the suggestion that dubious refereeing decisions cost the Rabbitohs the 1952 title and prevented Souths from stringing together all six premierships of 1950 to 1955. However, it cannot be argued that the Western Suburbs club were themselves a force of the 1950s, and their 1952 achievement was undeniably remarkable, as they played the whole second half of the season and the finals without their stars Frank Stanmore, Keith Holman and Arthur Collinson, who had all left with the touring Kangaroos to England and France.

Wests finished as minor premiers due in great part to their undefeated nine-game streak in the first full round of the 1952 season. In the final they met Souths who were seeking their third premiership in a row.

The controversy centered on a disallowed Rabbitohs try early in the game. Souths’ Frank Threlfo made a break and slipped the ball to Ken Macreadie who was in under the posts. Referee George Bishop ruled the pass forward and disallowed the try. In the interview Rayner also comments on the lopsided penalty count.

However the record-books show that Wests scored six tries to two, winning the match 22–12 and the club’s fourth premiership. Wests’ Hec Farrell and Souths’ Bryan Orrock were sent-off for fighting and went before the judiciary charged with kicking. Wests' coach Tom McMahon became the first coach to win a premiership in his debut coaching season.

Ironically, ten years later Wests would again threaten to break a string of premiership wins – the 1962 and 1963 Magpie sides both came close to ceasing St. George's long run – but again several refereeing controversies would affect the outcome. Both the 1962 and 1963 Grand Finals have been said to have been decided by questionable calls from referee Darcy Lawler and on those occasion Wests would be on the wrong end of disputed rulings.

Western Suburbs 22 (Tries: Schofield 2, Fitzgerald, Dines, Bain, McLean. Goals: Bain 2.)

South Sydney 12 (Tries: Smailes, Macreadie. Goals: Graves 3.)

== Player statistics ==
The following statistics are as of the conclusion of Round 18.

Top 5 point scorers

| Points | Player | Tries | Goals | Field Goals |
|---|---|---|---|---|
| 178 | Ron Rowles | 8 | 77 | 0 |
| 153 | Johnny Graves | 13 | 57 | 0 |
| 131 | George Bain | 3 | 61 | 0 |
| 106 | Gordon Clifford | 0 | 53 | 0 |
| 97 | Noel Pidding | 5 | 41 | 0 |

Top 5 try scorers

| Tries | Player |
|---|---|
| 18 | Peter O'Brien |
| 16 | John McClean |
| 14 | Bill Callinan |
| 14 | Tommy Ryan |
| 13 | Johnny Graves |

Top 5 goal scorers

| Goals | Player |
|---|---|
| 77 | Ron Rowles |
| 61 | George Bain |
| 57 | Johnny Graves |
| 53 | Gordon Clifford |
| 48 | Joe Jorgenson |
