= Bryan Orrock =

Australia international rugby league footballer (1930–2019)

Personal information
- Full name: Bryan James Orrock
- Born: 6 September 1930; Sydney, New South Wales, Australia
- Died: 26 January 2019 (aged 88); Central Coast, New South Wales, Australia

Playing information
- Position: Prop
Club
Years	Team	Pld	T	G	FG	P
1950–52	South Sydney	50	7	0	0	21
1954–58	St. George	54	9	0	0	27
	Total	104	16	0	0	48
Representative
Years	Team	Pld	T	G	FG	P
1953	Country NSW	1	0	0	0	0
1955–56	City NSW	2	0	0	0	0
1955–56	New South Wales	4	0	0	0	0
1956	Australia	2	0	0	0	0

Bryan Orrock (1930−2019) was an Australian professional rugby league footballer who played in the 1950s. An Australia national and New South Wales state representative forward, he played his club football in the NSWRFL Premiership for South Sydney and St. George, winning premierships with both clubs.

== Career ==
Orrock was a South Sydney junior and began playing first grade for them in the 1950 NSWRFL season when they won their first premiership in 18 years. Orrock did not play in that year's grand final, but played for Souths at front row forward in the 1951 NSWRFL season's premiership decider, in which they defeated St. George. In 1952 Orrock played for Sydney Colts against France and also played for Souths in the 1952 NSWRFL season's premiership final against Western Suburbs. Orrock along with Wests hooker Hec Farrell were sent off for fighting, becoming the first players ever to be sent from the field in a grand final. Souths lost the match and both men appeared before the juidicary for kicking and received cautions.

Having moved to Sydney's St. George district after marrying a local girl, Bryan Orrock signed with the St. George club and started playing for them in 1954. Orrock played for St. George at front row forward in the 1956 NSWRFL season's premiership final, defeating Balmain. Orrock was selected to go on the end-of-year Kangaroo tour becoming Kangaroo No. 327. Orrock played for St. George at front row forward in the 1957 NSWRFL season's premiership final victory over Manly-Warringah. In February 1958 Orrock had his appendix removed and did not resume playing until June that year. This was his last season playing first grade for St. George.

He finished his career in the country as captain-coach of Boorowa (Maher Cup), and in the early 60's, he coached Condobolin.
