= George Bain (rugby league, born 1929) =

Australian rugby league footballer (1929–1998)

Personal information
- Full name: George Charles Bain
- Born: 1929 Manly, NSW, Australia
- Died: 11 October 1998 Croydon Park, NSW, Australia

Playing information
- Position: Fullback
Club
Years	Team	Pld	T	G	FG	P
1949–57	Western Suburbs	72	12	218	0	472

George Charles Bain (1929 – 11 October 1998) was an Australian rugby league footballer.

Born in Manly, Bain came up through the juniors of Western Suburbs, making his first–grade debut in 1949. He broke into the team as a five–eighth, to replace an injured Frank Stanmore, but was utilised mainly on a wing during his first season. From 1952 onwards he established himself as the Western Suburbs fullback. He won a premiership with Western Suburbs in 1952, contributing a try and two goals in the grand final win over South Sydney. In 1953, Bain was called up by national selectors to represent the "Rest of Australia".

Bain was a fitter and turner by profession.
