= Cliff Smailes =

Australian rugby league footballer

Personal information
- Full name: Clifford Trevor Smailes
- Born: 23 January 1930 Wingham, New South Wales, Australia
- Died: 13 July 2005 (aged 75) Paddington, New South Wales

Playing information
- Position: Wing
Club
Years	Team	Pld	T	G	FG	P
1950–53	South Sydney	66	25	0	0	75
1956	Wests	2	0	0	0	0
	Total	68	25	0	0	75
- Source: Whiticker/Hudson

Clifford Smailes (1930–2005) was an Australian rugby league footballer who played in the 1950s.

Cliff 'Cec' Smailes played for the South Sydney Rabbitohs for four years between 1950 and 1953. He won a premiership with the club when he played wing in the 1950 Grand Final. Smailes also played in the Souths team that were runners up in 1952 and scored a try in the match. He played one season at Western Suburbs Magpies in 1956 before retiring.

Cliff Smailes died on 13 July 2005, aged 75.
