= Milton Atkinson =

Australian rugby league footballer (1926-2008)

Personal information
- Full name: Milton George Atkinson
- Born: 17 April 1926 Paddington, New South Wales
- Died: 14 December 2008 (aged 82) Maroubra, New South Wales

Playing information
- Position: Centre
Club
Years	Team	Pld	T	G	FG	P
1947–49	Eastern Suburbs	15	3	0	0	9
1950–53	South Sydney	42	14	0	0	42
	Total	57	17	0	0	51
- Source: Whiticker/Hudson
- Military career
- Allegiance: Australia
- Branch: Royal Australian Air Force
- Service years: 1944-1946
- Rank: Leading Aircraftman
- Conflicts: World War II

Milton George Atkinson (1926–2008) was an Australian rugby league footballer who played in the 1940s. He became a dual premiership winning player for the South Sydney Rabbitohs.

Born in Paddington, New South Wales on 17 April 1926, Milton Atkinson was a professional rugby league footballer for the Sydney Roosters and the South Sydney Rabbitohs. An Easts junior, Milton Atkinson's rugby league career started after World War II. He served in the RAAF between 1944 and 1946 as a Leading Aircraftman. After the war he joined Eastern Suburbs, playing two first grade seasons in 1947 and 1949. Atkinson shifted to South Sydney Rabbitohs in 1950 and stayed until 1952, but during this period he won two premierships with Souths in 1950 and 1951.

Milton Atkinson died on 14 December 2008, aged 82, late of Maroubra, New South Wales.
