= Michael McLean (rugby league) =

Australian rugby league footballer

Michael "Dolly" McLean
Personal information
- Full name: Michael McLean

Playing information
- Position: Wing
Club
Years	Team	Pld	T	G	FG	P
1968–71	Manly-Warringah	30	5	0	0	15
1972	North Sydney	9	1	0	0	3
	Total	39	6	0	0	18
- Source: As of 3 April 2019
- Father: Peter McLean

Michael McLean is an Australian former rugby league footballer who played in 1960s and 1970s. He played for Manly-Warringah and North Sydney in the New South Wales Rugby League (NSWRL) competition.

== Background ==
McLean played his junior rugby league for Enfield before being graded by Manly-Warringah.

== Playing career ==
McLean made his first grade debut for Manly in 1968. In the same year, McLean played on the wing in the 1968 NSWRL grand final against South Sydney. Manly were appearing in their 4th grand final but were still in search of their first premiership. Manly had beaten Souths a fortnight earlier to reach the grand final but in the decider Souths defeated Manly 13–9.

McLean played with Manly up until the end of 1971 before departing the club for rivals North Sydney. McLean played 9 games in his only season for Norths in 1972. After leaving North Sydney, McLean played in the local country competitions and captain-coached Port Macquarie in 1975.
