= Dev Dines =

Australian rugby league footballer (1930-2018)

Personal information
- Full name: Devitt Whitton Dines
- Born: 20 April 1930 Newcastle, New South Wales, Australia
- Died: 2 March 2018 (aged 87) Tamworth, New South Wales

Playing information
- Position: Five-eighth
Club
Years	Team	Pld	T	G	FG	P
1950–57	Western Suburbs	58	24	10	0	92

Devitt Whitton 'Dev' Dines (1930–2018) was an Australian rugby league footballer who played in the 1950s.

== Playing career ==
Dines was a five-eighth for Western Suburbs between 1950-1951, late 1952, 1953-1957. He had transferred to Mareeba, Queensland as a player in 1952 before being sensationally recalled to Western Suburbs, in a bid to help the club win the 1952 Grand Final as two of their best players, Keith Holman and Frank Stanmore were away on the 1952/53 Kangaroo tour.

Dines scored a try in the 1952 Grand Final side that won the premiership. Dines stayed with Western Suburbs for a few more years before retiring. In total, Dines made 58 appearances for Wests.

Dines was a co-founder and Life Member of the Canley Vale Junior Rugby League Football Club. He died in Tamworth, New South Wales on 2 March 2018 aged 90.
