= Jack Wall (rugby league) =

Australian rugby league footballer

Personal information
- Full name: John Charles Wall
- Born: 1 September 1926; Kearsley, New South Wales, Australia
- Died: 6 August 2007 (aged 80)

Playing information
- Position: Wing
Club
Years	Team	Pld	T	G	FG	P
1948–51	Western Suburbs	28	14	0	0	42
- Source: As of 14 May 2019

Jack Wall was an Australian rugby league footballer who played in the 1940s and 1950s. He played for Western Suburbs in the New South Wales Rugby League (NSWRL) competition.

== Playing career ==
Wall made his first grade debut for Western Suburbs in 1949, the year after the club had won their third premiership. Wests finished just behind minor premiers South Sydney and qualified for the finals. Wests premiership defence ended in the semi-final as they were defeated by Balmain 20-13 at the Sydney Cricket Ground with Wall playing on the wing.

In the next season, Western Suburbs reached the 1950 NSWRL grand final against Souths after disposing of Balmain in the preliminary final 28-10 with Wall scoring a try. In the grand final, Wall played on the wing as Wests went into half time trailing Souths 15-11. Souths held on in the second half to win the match and the premiership 21-15 at the Sydney Sports Ground. Wall finished 1950 as the club's joint top try scorer. Wall departed the club the following season in 1951 after the club reached the finals but were defeated by Manly-Warringah in the semi-final. The following year in 1952, Western Suburbs would go on to win their fourth and final premiership.
