= Peter O'Brien (rugby league) =

Australian rugby league footballer

Personal information
- Full name: Peter O'Brien
- Born: 25 March 1928 Sydney, New South Wales, Australia
- Died: 13 November 2016 (aged 88) Sydney, New South Wales, Australia

Playing information
- Position: Wing
Club
Years	Team	Pld	T	G	FG	P
1949–55	North Sydney	103	77	0	0	231

Peter O'Brien (1928-2016) was an Australian rugby league footballer who played in the 1940s and 1950s. He played in the NSWRFL premiership for North Sydney as a winger.

== Playing career ==
O'Brien began his first grade career in 1949 and in 1952 was the season's leading try scorer and equaled Cec Blinkhorn’s club record of 20 tries in the main premiership competition.

O'Brien was a member of the North's teams in the 1950s where the club made the preliminary finals in 1952 and 1953 but lost to South Sydney and the semi-finals in 1954 where they lost to St. George.

O'Brien retired at the end of the 1955 season and remains the club's third highest try scorer.

== Post playing ==
After retiring, O'Brien became an administrator at Norths for many years. He died on 13 November 2016.
