= Bill Stewart (rugby league) =

Australian rugby league player

Personal information
- Full name: Colin William Stewart
- Born: 4 October 1927; Tamworth, New South Wales, Australia

Playing information
- Position: Halfback
Club
Years	Team	Pld	T	G	FG	P
1949	Balmain	1	0	0	0	0
1950–51	South Sydney	30	6	0	0	18
	Total	31	6	0	0	18

Bill Stewart was an Australian rugby league footballer who played in the 1940s and 1950s. He played for South Sydney and Balmain in the NSWRL competition.

== Playing career ==
Stewart made his first grade debut for Balmain in 1949 but only featured in 1 game before departing the club for South Sydney.

In his first season at Souths, the club won the minor premiership and reached the grand final. Stewart played at halfback in Souths 21-15 premiership victory over Western Suburbs which was played at the Sydney Sports Ground in front of 32,373 people.

In 1951, Stewart played 11 games for Souths as they won the minor premiership again and reached the grand final against Manly-Warringah. Stewart missed out on playing in the club's premiership victory, due to having broken his leg in the round 14 match against Wests. The grand final against Manly-Warringah was also a record high score for a grand final at the time as Souths won 42–14.
