= Frank Stanmore (rugby league) =

Australia international rugby league footballer

Personal information
- Full name: Francis Stanley Stanmore
- Born: 18 October 1929 Cessnock, New South Wales
- Died: 29 June 2005 (aged 75) Wangi Wangi, New South Wales

Playing information
- Position: Five-eighth
Club
Years	Team	Pld	T	G	FG	P
	Cessnock
1948–53	Wests (Sydney)	87	23	0	0	69
1954–55	Maitland
	Total	87	23	0	0	69
Representative
Years	Team	Pld	T	G	FG	P
1948–51	City NSW	4	1	0	0	3
1948–??	New South Wales	8
1949–53	Australia	10	0	0	0	0
1954–55	Country NSW	2	0	0	0	0

Frank Stanmore (1929–2005) was an Australian rugby league footballer who played in the 1940s and 1950s. An Australian international and New South Wales interstate representative five-eighth, he played club football in Sydney's NSWRFL for Western Suburbs, winning the 1948 Premiership with them. Stanmore also played in the Newcastle Rugby League and was inducted into the Hunter Region Sporting Hall of Fame.

Stanmore, who played representative rugby league as a 17-year-old five-eighth for Coalfields against Newcastle in 1947, moved from Cessnock to Sydney's Western Suburbs club. During his first season of NSWRFL Premiership first grade in 1948, he earned selection for Sydney and New South Wales. Also that year he played in Wests' grand final victory over Balmain. At the start of the following season he was at the centre of a dispute between the Cessnock and Western Suburbs clubs. Remaining with Wests, that year he was selected to go on the Australian national team's tour of New Zealand but did not play in a test match. He is listed on the Australian Players Register as Kangaroo No. 270.

Stanmore was selected to play in 1950's Ashes series victory over Great Britain alongside his club halves partner, Keith Holman. At the end of the 1950 NSWRFL season Stanmore played in Wests' grand final loss to South Sydney. He was selected to represent Sydney against France during their 1951 tour of Australasia in a match that ended in a 19-all draw. He also represented Australia against France. He was selected to go on the 1952-53 Kangaroo tour of Great Britain and France, thus missing Western Suburbs' victory in 1952 NSWRFL Premiership Final. On tour he played in four tests and captained the Kangaroos to victory in seven out of seven minor matches. Returning to the Newcastle Rugby League, Stanmore captain-coached Maitland's club in 1954, taking them to the grand final, but the match was lost to Cessnock. He also continued playing representative football for Country NSW.

Stanmore died in 2005 at the age of 75 from a heart attack related to a breathing disorder. In 2011 Stanmore was named at five-eighth in Cessnock's team of the century.
