= Tom McMahon Jr. =

Australian rugby league referee and coach

Personal information
- Born: 1906 or 1907 Scotland
- Died: 25 April 1969 (aged 62) The Entrance, NSW, Australia

Coaching information
Club
Years	Team	Gms	W	D	L	W%
1952	Western Suburbs	20	15	4	1	75

Refereeing information
Years	Competition	Apps
1933–51	NSWRFL

Tom McMahon (died 1969) was an Australian rugby league referee and coach.

== Biography ==
Born to Irish parents in Scotland, McMahon moved with his family to Australia around the age of two. His playing career was limited to the Balmain junior league, where he was a centre and five–eighth.

McMahon began as a referee during the early 1930s and had officiated in only eight first–grades matches when he took charge of his inaugural interstate fixture. During the 1948–49 Kangaroo tour of Great Britain, McMahon was called upon to officiate the tourists' match against Yorkshire, having made the trip as a commentator for radio station 2GB. He was a referee on Great Britain's 1946 and 1950 tours of Australia, as well as matches on France's tour in 1951. After officiating his final NSWRFL match in 1951, McMahon was elected coach of the Western Suburbs Magpies for the 1952 season, despite having never previously coached above schoolboy level. He nonetheless was able to guide the Magpies to the premiership in what would be his only season as coach.
