= Malcolm Spencer =

Australian rugby league player

Personal information
- Full name: Malcolm Richard Spencer
- Born: 5 November 1931; Sydney, New South Wales, Australia
- Died: 20 January 1990 (aged 58); Maroubra, New South Wales, Australia

Playing information
- Height: 180 cm (5 ft 11 in)
- Weight: 84 kg (13 st 3 lb)
- Position: Centre
Club
Years	Team	Pld	T	G	FG	P
1952	South Sydney	9	4	0	0	12
1953	Eastern Suburbs	10	0	0	0	0
1955	South Sydney	5	0	0	0	0
1957	Newtown	7	2	0	0	6
	Total	31	6	0	0	18
- Source: As of 25 June 2019

Malcolm Spencer (5 November 1931 – 20 January 1990) was an Australian rugby league footballer who played as a centre in the 1950s. He played for South Sydney in the New South Wales Rugby League (NSWRL) competition during the club's second golden era where they won 5 premierships from 7 grand final appearances between 1949 and 1955. Spencer also had stints with Eastern Suburbs and Newtown.

== Playing career ==
Spencer made his first grade debut for South Sydney in 1952. At the end of the season, Souths reached their 4th grand final in a row against Western Suburbs. Souths would lose the grand final 22–12 with Spencer playing at centre. The match was remembered due to its controversy with claims the referee George Bishop had put a big wager on Wests winning the game. Souths claimed that they were denied two fair tries and Wests had scored one try off a blatant knock on.

In 1953, Spencer joined South Sydney's rivals Eastern Suburbs. In 1954, Spencer captain coached Bellingen in the country rugby league competition.

Spencer returned to South Sydney in 1955. Halfway through the season, Souths were given next to no chance of retaining their premiership but the club then managed to win 9 matches in a row including 2 finals games to reach the 1955 NSWRL Grand Final against minor premiers Newtown. Newtown went into the match as favorites due to Souths being without fullback Clive Churchill and other star players. Spencer played at centre in the match as South Sydney defeated Newtown 12–11 to claim their 16th premiership.

In 1957, Spencer played one final season in first grade for Newtown before retiring

Spencer died at his home in Maroubra, New South Wales following a short illness on 20 January 1990. He was 58 years of age.
