= Hec Farrell =

Australian rugby league footballer

Personal information
- Full name: Eric William Farrell
- Born: 9 May 1923; Lismore, New South Wales
- Died: 6 August 1988 (aged 65)

Playing information
- Position: Hooker
Club
Years	Team	Pld	T	G	FG	P
1951–57	Western Suburbs	55	1	0	0	3

Hec Farrell was an Australian professional rugby league footballer who played in the 1950s. He played for Western Suburbs as a hooker.

== Playing career ==
Farrell came from Lismore, New South Wales and made his debut for Western Suburbs in 1951. In 1952, Farrell was a member of the Western Suburbs side which claimed their fourth premiership defeating South Sydney 22–10 in the grand final. The match was remembered due to its controversy with claims the referee George Bishop had put a big wager on Wests winning the game. Souths claimed that they were denied two fair tries and Wests had scored one try off a blatant knock on. Farrell himself was sent off in the second half of the match. This would prove to be the last premiership Western Suburbs would win as a stand-alone entity before exiting the competition in 1999. Farrell played on with Wests until 1957 and then retired.
