= Peter McLean (rugby league) =

Australian rugby league footballer and coach

Personal information
- Full name: Peter McLean
- Born: 12 January 1925
- Died: 19 October 1986 (aged 61) Sydney, Australia

Playing information
- Position: Lock
Club
Years	Team	Pld	T	G	FG	P
1947–53	Western Suburbs	84	21	0	0	63

Coaching information
Club
Years	Team	Gms	W	D	L	W%
1953	Western Suburbs	18	5	0	13	28
- Source: As of 19 February 2019
- Relatives: Michael McLean (son)

Peter McLean was an Australian professional rugby league footballer who played in the 1940s and 1950s. He played for Western Suburbs as a lock.

== Playing career ==
McLean made his debut for Western Suburbs in 1947 and in his second season playing for the club was a member of the Wests side which claimed their third premiership defeating Balmain 8-5 at the Sydney Sports Ground.

In 1950, McLean played in his second grand final which was the 21-15 defeat by South Sydney. In 1952, McLean was a member of the Wests side which defeated Souths in the 1952 grand final with McLean scoring a try. This would be Western Suburbs fourth and last premiership as a stand alone club before exiting the competition in 1999. McLean played one more season in 1953 as captain-coach before retiring.
