= Ken Macreadie =

Australian rugby league footballer

Personal information
- Full name: Ken Macreadie

Playing information
- Position: Second-row
Club
Years	Team	Pld	T	G	FG	P
1950–53	South Sydney	40	11	0	0	33
Representative
Years	Team	Pld	T	G	FG	P
1953	NSW City	1	0	0	0	0

Ken Macreadie was an Australian professional rugby league footballer who played in the 1950s. He played for South Sydney as a second-row.

== Playing career ==
Macreadie made his debut for Souths in 1950 and in the same year became a premiership winning player when Souths defeated Western Suburbs 21-15 at the Sydney Cricket Ground. Macreadie missed out on the 1951 premiership victory over Manly but was a member of the Souths side which reached the grand final in 1952. In a controversial game, Souths lost the match 22-12 with allegations that the match was refereed unfairly. Macreadie himself was denied a try in the first half when the final pass was deemed to have been ruled forward when many said the pass went backwards. Macreadie played one more season for Souths in 1953 but was not included in the grand final team which defeated St George 31-12.
