= New South Wales Rugby League premiership =

NSWRL Premierships run from 1908 until 1994

NSWRL Premiership
- Sport: Rugby league
- Inaugural season: 1908; 118 years ago
- Ceased: 1994; 32 years ago
- Replaced by: ARL Premiership
- Holders: Canberra Raiders (3rd title)
- Most titles: South Sydney Rabbitohs (20 titles)
- Related competition: Winfield Cup

The New South Wales Rugby League premiership was the first rugby league football club competition established in Australia and contributor to today's National Rugby League. Run by the New South Wales Rugby League (initially named the New South Wales Rugby Football League) from 1908 until 1994, the premiership was the state's elite rugby league competition, parallel to Queensland's first-class league, the Brisbane Rugby League.

For most of the premiership's history it was contested by clubs from the state of New South Wales only, but later attempted to grow into a nationwide competition, eventually leading to the competition being played under the auspices of the Australian Rugby League in 1995. Despite this name, the 1995 and 1996 Australian Rugby League Premierships competitions were still administered by the Board and staff of the New South Wales Rugby League.

== History ==
=== 1908: Rugby league premiership in Sydney ===
The inaugural New South Wales Rugby Football League (NSWRFL) premiership began in 1908, and was made up of eight Sydney-based teams and one team from Newcastle. Cumberland joined the competition after the first round, meaning that they played one game fewer than the rest of the field for the season. Still known as the "foundation clubs" today, these nine teams battled against one another during the 1908 season, with South Sydney taking the first premiership honours after beating Eastern Suburbs in the Final.

Club	Nickname	Years Contested	Matches					Seasons
Club	Nickname	Years Contested	Played	Won	Drew	Lost	Win–loss	Played	Premiers	Minor Premiers	Runners-up
Balmain	Tigers	1908–1994	1705	871	68	766	53.08%	92	11	7	9
Cumberland	Fruitpickers	1908	8	1	0	7	12.50%	1	0	0	0
Eastern Suburbs	Roosters	1908–1994	1880	995	67	818	54.71%	92	11	15	11
Glebe	Dirty Reds	1908–1929	297	163	6	128	55.89%	22	0	1	4
Newcastle	Rebels	1908–1909	20	9	0	11	45.00%	2	0	0	0
Newtown	Jets	1908–1983	1305	583	59	663	46.93%	76	3	6	7
North Sydney	Bears	1908–1994	1665	678	71	916	42.85%	92	2	2	1
South Sydney	Rabbitohs	1908–1994	1813	940	45	828	53.09%	92	20	17	13
Western Suburbs	Magpies	1908–1994	1691	734	49	908	44.86%	92	4	5	8

=== 1909–1994: Expansion of the premiership ===
Between 1912 and 1925 the premiers were decided by first past the post. As a result of South Sydney's dominant 1925 season, the NSWRFL introduced a finals system in order to maintain interest in the competition.

Over the decades since the NSWRFL competition started, Sydney suburban teams came and went throughout its history but it was not until 1982 that the competition saw significant expansion outside of the Sydney area. The two new inclusions were from the Australian Capital Territory – the Canberra Raiders – as well as a team from the southern New South Wales region – the Illawarra Steelers. This corresponded with the adoption of commercial sponsorship of the competition for the first time, seeing it become the Winfield Cup (named after the popular cigarette brand).

The NSWRFL had also commenced a very popular and successful mid-week competition in 1973, originally known as the Amco Cup, but also as the Tooth Cup and the National Panasonic Cup. The success of this competition, which included teams from both Brisbane and New Zealand ultimately created pressure for further expansion of the NSWRL competition. In 1984, the New South Wales Rugby Football League changed its name to New South Wales Rugby League.

In 1988, for the very first time, two Queensland teams joined the competition, with the inclusions of the Brisbane Broncos and the Gold Coast-Tweed Giants. This saw the premiership competition move beyond the outer borders of New South Wales. At the same time, as a result of mounting pressure from the central coast of New South Wales, Newcastle returned to the competition with a new franchise. Their return saw the end of an 86-year wait in the wilderness and this time around the team was badged the Newcastle Knights.

Club	Traditional colours	Years contested	Matches					Seasons
Club	Traditional colours	Years contested	Played	Won	Drew	Lost	Win–loss	Played	Premiers	Minor premiers	Runners-up
Annandale		1910–1920	153	25	6	122	18.30%	11	0	0	0
Sydney University		1920–1937	242	47	5	190	20.45%	18	0	0	1
St. George		1921–1998	1545	910	56	579	60.71%	78	15	15	12
Canterbury-Bankstown		1935–1994	1502	778	53	671	53.56%	71	8	6	8
Manly-Warringah		1947–1999	1261	719	35	507	58.41%	56	7	9	10
Parramatta		1947–1994	1321	608	38	675	47.46%	59	4	5	4
Cronulla-Sutherland		1967–1994	932	456	22	454	50.11%	39	0	2	3
Penrith		1967–1994	917	379	26	512	42.75%	39	2	2	1
Illawarra		1982–1998	396	153	13	230	40.28%	17	0	0	0
Canberra		1982–1994	606	323	9	274	54.04%	24	3	1	2
Brisbane		1988–1994	457	299	11	147	66.63%	18	5	4	0
Newcastle		1988–1994	446	234	14	198	54.04%	18	2	0	0
Gold Coast		1988–1998	246	53	9	184	23.37%	11	0	0	0

After mostly solid results were obtained by the expansion teams in 1988, there was increasing pressure for new inclusions into the competition. Having decided in May 1992 that a team from Auckland would join the premiership in 1995, the League announced in November that three more new clubs — a second team from Brisbane, and also a team each from Perth and Townsville — will also be invited.

In 1995, some seven years later, the competition expanded further into Queensland, with the inception of the South Queensland Crushers and the North Queensland Cowboys. 1995 also saw a new team in Western Australia, the 'Western Reds', later called the Perth Reds, as well as a New Zealand-based team – the Auckland Warriors. The total number of teams in the competition was now twenty – the largest-scale rugby league competition ever in Australia. The premiership's new national outlook was further reflected in the governing body's name, with the New South Wales Rugby League transferring control of the competition to the Australian Rugby League (ARL).

== Senior grade premiers ==
Between 1912 and 1925 there was no semi-final system and a final was only played if two clubs finished level at the conclusion of the minor premiership. Souths won the 1909 premiership when Balmain forfeited in protest against the final being played as a preliminary match before a promotional game between the national Rugby League and Rugby Union sides. The 1937 season also featured no finals as the year was disrupted by the Kangaroos tour. Between 1926 and 1953 first played third and second played fourth and winners played off. If the minor premiers were defeated they had a right of challenge, but if they were not defeated there was no true "grand final."

From 1954 a mandatory grand final was introduced in which there was a knockout minor semi-final between third and fourth and a second-chance major semi between first and second. The winner of the major semi went to the grand final and a preliminary final was played between the winner of the minor semi and the loser of the major semi to decide who would meet the winner of the major semi.

In 1973 a final five was devised with the top team going straight into the major semi, the second and third teams playing a major preliminary semi, and the fourth and fifth playing a sudden-death minor preliminary semi. The top team played the winner of the major preliminary semi-final, whilst the winner of the minor preliminary semi played the loser of the major preliminary semi in the minor semi-final (which was played as before under the final four system.

Season	Grand finals			Minor premiers
Season	Premiers	Score	Runners-up	Minor premiers
1908	South Sydney	14–12	Eastern Suburbs	South Sydney
1909	South Sydney	forfeit	Balmain	South Sydney
1910	Newtown	4–4	South Sydney	Newtown
1911	Eastern Suburbs	11–8	Glebe	Glebe
1912	Eastern Suburbs	N/A	Glebe	N/A
1913	Eastern Suburbs	N/A	Newtown	N/A
1914	South Sydney	N/A	Newtown	N/A
1915	Balmain	N/A	Glebe	N/A
1916	Balmain	5–3	South Sydney	Balmain
1917	Balmain	N/A	South Sydney	N/A
1918	South Sydney	N/A	Western Suburbs	N/A
1919	Balmain	N/A	Eastern Suburbs	N/A
1920	Balmain	N/A	South Sydney	N/A
1921	North Sydney	N/A	Eastern Suburbs	N/A
1922	North Sydney	35–3	Glebe	North Sydney
1923	Eastern Suburbs	15–12	South Sydney	Eastern Suburbs
1924	Balmain	3–0	South Sydney	Balmain
1925	South Sydney	N/A	Western Suburbs	N/A
1926	South Sydney	11–5	Sydney Uni.	South Sydney
1927	South Sydney	20–11	St. George	South Sydney
1928	South Sydney	26–5	Eastern Suburbs	St. George
1929	South Sydney	30–10	Newtown	South Sydney
1930	Western Suburbs	27–2	St. George	Western Suburbs
1931	South Sydney	12–7	Eastern Suburbs	Eastern Suburbs
1932	South Sydney	19–12	Western Suburbs	South Sydney
1933	Newtown	18–5	St. George	Newtown
1934	Western Suburbs	15–2	Eastern Suburbs	Eastern Suburbs
1935	Eastern Suburbs	19–3	South Sydney	Eastern Suburbs
1936	Eastern Suburbs	32–12	Balmain	Eastern Suburbs
1937	Eastern Suburbs	N/A	South Sydney	N/A
1938	Canterbury	19–6	Eastern Suburbs	Canterbury
1939	Balmain	33–4	South Sydney	Balmain
1940	Eastern Suburbs	24–14	Canterbury	Eastern Suburbs
1941	St. George	31–14	Eastern Suburbs	Eastern Suburbs
1942	Canterbury	11–9	St. George	Canterbury
1943	Newtown	34–7	North Sydney	Newtown
1944	Balmain	12–8	Newtown	Newtown
1945	Eastern Suburbs	22–18	Balmain	Eastern Suburbs
1946	Balmain	13–12	St. George	St. George
1947	Balmain	13–9	Canterbury	Canterbury
1948	Western Suburbs	8–5	Balmain	Western Suburbs
1949	St. George	19–12	South Sydney	South Sydney
1950	South Sydney	21–15	Western Suburbs	South Sydney
1951	South Sydney	42–14	Manly	South Sydney
1952	Western Suburbs	22–12	South Sydney	Western Suburbs
1953	South Sydney	31–12	St. George	South Sydney
1954	South Sydney	23–15	Newtown	Newtown
1955	South Sydney	12–11	Newtown	Newtown
1956	St. George	18–12	Balmain	St. George
1957	St. George	31–9	Manly	St. George
1958	St. George	20–9	Western Suburbs	St. George
1959	St. George	20–0	Manly	St. George
1960	St. George	31–6	Eastern Suburbs	St. George
1961	St. George	22–0	Western Suburbs	Western Suburbs
1962	St. George	9–6	Western Suburbs	St. George
1963	St. George	8–3	Western Suburbs	St. George
1964	St. George	11–6	Balmain	St. George
1965	St. George	12–8	South Sydney	St. George
1966	St. George	23–4	Balmain	St. George
1967	South Sydney	12–10	Canterbury	St. George
1968	South Sydney	13–9	Manly	South Sydney
1969	Balmain	11–2	South Sydney	South Sydney
1970	South Sydney	23–12	Manly	South Sydney
1971	South Sydney	16–10	St. George	Manly
1972	Manly	19–14	Eastern Suburbs	Manly
1973	Manly	10–7	Cronulla	Manly
1974	Eastern Suburbs	19–4	Canterbury	Eastern Suburbs
1975	Eastern Suburbs	38–0	St. George	Eastern Suburbs
1976	Manly	13–10	Parramatta	Manly
1977	St. George	9–9; 22–0	Parramatta	Parramatta
1978	Manly	11–11; 16–0	Cronulla	Western Suburbs
1979	St. George	17–13	Canterbury	St. George
1980	Canterbury	18–4	Eastern Suburbs	Eastern Suburbs
1981	Parramatta	20–11	Newtown	Eastern Suburbs
1982	Parramatta	21–8	Manly	Parramatta
1983	Parramatta	18–6	Manly	Manly
1984	Canterbury	6–4	Parramatta	Canterbury
1985	Canterbury	7–6	St George	St George
1986	Parramatta	4–2	Canterbury	Parramatta
1987	Manly	18–8	Canberra	Manly
1988	Canterbury	24–12	Balmain	Cronulla
1989	Canberra	19–14	Balmain	South Sydney
1990	Canberra	18–14	Penrith	Canberra
1991	Penrith	19–12	Canberra	Penrith
1992	Brisbane	28–8	St George	Brisbane
1993	Brisbane	14–6	St George	Canterbury
1994	Canberra	36–12	Canterbury	Canterbury

- 1909: Balmain refused to play the final in protest to the game being held as a curtain-raiser to a Kangaroos v Wallabies match.
  South Sydney played, kicked off, scored and were declared premiers. Many contend though that a 'gentlemans agreement' was reached to postpone the game to the following weekend – and the action undertaken by South Sydney in starting the match sparked a fierce and bitter rivalry between the clubs that continued for many decades.
- 1910: Top two played off for the title. In the event of a drawn match, the superior record during the season secured the title, Newtown had compiled 23 competition points, South Sydney 22.
- 1977–78: Drawn games requiring a replay.
- 1989: The score was tied 14 all at normal full-time – extra time was played to decide the winner.

=== Results (senior grade) ===
Team	Wins	Losses	Years won	Years lost
South Sydney	20	13	1908, 1909, 1914, 1918, 1925, 1926, 1927, 1928, 1929, 1931, 1932, 1950, 1951, 1953, 1954, 1955, 1967, 1968, 1970, 1971	1910, 1916, 1917, 1920, 1923, 1924, 1935, 1937, 1939, 1949, 1952, 1965, 1969
St George	15	12	1941, 1949, 1956, 1957, 1958, 1959, 1960, 1961, 1962, 1963, 1964, 1965, 1966, 1977, 1979	1927, 1930, 1933, 1942, 1946, 1953, 1971, 1975, 1985, 1992, 1993, 1996
Eastern Suburbs	11	11	1911, 1912, 1913, 1923, 1935, 1936, 1937, 1940, 1945, 1974, 1975	1908, 1919, 1921, 1928, 1931, 1934, 1938, 1941, 1960, 1972, 1980
Balmain	11	9	1915, 1916, 1917, 1919, 1920, 1924, 1939, 1944, 1946, 1947, 1969	1909, 1936, 1945, 1948, 1956, 1964, 1966, 1988, 1989
Manly	5	7	1972, 1973, 1976, 1978, 1987	1951, 1957, 1959, 1968, 1970, 1982, 1983
Canterbury	6	7	1938, 1942, 1980, 1984, 1985, 1988	1940, 1947, 1967, 1974, 1979, 1986, 1994
Brisbane	2	0	1992, 1993	
Western Suburbs	4	8	1930, 1934, 1948, 1952	1918, 1925, 1932, 1950, 1958, 1961, 1962, 1963
Parramatta	4	3	1981, 1982, 1983, 1986	1976, 1977, 1984
Newtown	3	7	1910, 1933, 1943	1913, 1914, 1929, 1944, 1954, 1955, 1981
Canberra	3	2	1989, 1990, 1994	1987, 1991
North Sydney	2	1	1921, 1922	1943
Penrith	1	1	1991	1990
Cronulla	0	2	–	1973, 1978
Glebe	0	4	–	1911, 1912, 1915, 1922
Sydney Uni.	0	1	–	1926

== Reserve grade premiers ==
Year	Premiers	Score	Runners-up	Decider	Report	Winning captain(s)	Winning coach	Referee
1908	Eastern Suburbs		South Sydney	No				
1909	Eastern Suburbs	11–7	Glebe	Final	TSS			W.P. Finegan
1910	Eastern Suburbs	5–2	Newtown	Final	EN			L. Kearney
1911	Eastern Suburbs	12–0	Glebe	Final	ST			A. Ballerum
1912	Glebe	30–0	Redfern United	Final	SMH			A. Finegan
1913	South Sydney	10–3	Grosvenor	Final	Sun			T. McMahon Sr.
1914	South Sydney	6–5	Eastern Suburbs	Final	Sun			J. Buchanan
1915	Balmain	9–3	Glebe	Final	Sun			
1916	Balmain	6–4	Eastern Suburbs	Final	Sun			
1917	South Sydney		Balmain	No				
1918	Glebe		South Sydney	No				
1919	Glebe		Western Suburbs	No				
1920	Glebe		South Sydney	No	SMH			
1921	Glebe		North Sydney	No				
1922	Newtown	10–2	Glebe	Final	Sun	E. Gallagher		W. Neill
1923	South Sydney	13–6	Balmain	Final	SMH			A. Thornton
1924	South Sydney		Western Suburbs	No				
1925	South Sydney	14–2	Balmain	Final	TR			E. Kerr
1926	South Sydney	25–13	North Sydney	Final	Sun			L. Dolan
1927	South Sydney	16–5	St. George	Final	SGC	James Breen		Lal Deane
1928	Balmain	7–5	Eastern Suburbs	Final	Sun	Arthur Tennant		B. Wales
1929	South Sydney	26–3	Western Suburbs	Final	Sun	Tom Craigie		W. Fry
1930	Balmain	5–0	South Sydney	GF	Truth	S. Lever		W. Fry
1931	South Sydney	24–5	St. George	Final	Sun			W. Neill
1932	South Sydney	5–2	Newtown	GF	Sun	Jackie Jones		W. Fry
1933	Balmain	15–12	South Sydney	GF	Sun	George Frankland		W. Fry
1934	South Sydney	13–10	Balmain	GF	Sun	Jim Tait		J. Murphy
1935	Eastern Suburbs	16–2	Balmain	GF	Sun			T. McMahon Jr.
1936	Western Suburbs	15–5	North Sydney	Final	Truth	Jim Parsons	Jerry Brien	T. McMahon Jr.
1937	Eastern Suburbs		Newtown	No				
1938	St. George	9–4	Balmain	GF	Sun	Jack Kenyon		A. Davis
1939	Canterbury	13–0	North Sydney	GF	Sun	Jim Duncombe		J. McGaulay
1940	North Sydney	10–5	St. George	GF	SGC			Jack O'Brien
1941	Balmain	13–4	St. George	GF	Sun	John Rees		P. Lee
1942	North Sydney	15–5	St. George	GF	Sun			Aub Oxford
1943	South Sydney	15–9	Balmain	GF	Sun	George Kilham		G. Bishop
1944	Balmain	11–9	North Sydney	Final	Sun	(Jack Danzey Snr)		Jack O'Brien
1945	South Sydney	11–7	Canterbury	GF	Sun	Ken Brogan		Aub Oxford
1946	Balmain	8–5	Eastern Suburbs	GF	Sun	Gil Bo		XJack O'Brien
1947	Newtown	6–2	Balmain	GF	Sun	Fred Fayers	Keith Ellis	L. Williams
1948	Newtown	7–4	Western Suburbs	GF	Sun		Keith Ellis	Col Pearce
1949	Eastern Suburbs	30–7	Newtown	GF	DT	Jim Hunt		Aub Oxford
1950	Balmain	10–6	St. George	Final	DT	George Williams		G. Bishop
1951	Newtown	10–6	St. George	GF	SMH	George Debnam		Aub Oxford
1952	South Sydney	19–0	Canterbury	GF	Sun	Ray Mason		Jack O'Brien
1953	South Sydney	17–11	Manly	GF	Sun	Norm Nilson		Aub Oxford
1954	Manly	9–4	South Sydney	GF	SH			Darcy Lawler
1955	North Sydney	9–2	St. George	GF		Robert Gorman		Jack O'Brien
1956	South Sydney	10–6	Manly	GF		Ray Mason		Col Pearce
1957	Balmain	16–7	North Sydney	GF		Ron Clifford		Col Pearce
1958	Balmain	20–10	St. George	GF	RLN	Ron Proudfoot		Col Pearce
1959	North Sydney	19–10	St. George	GF	RLN	Robert Sullivan	Robert Sullivan	Col Pearce
1960	Manly	17–6	Balmain	GF	RLN	Robert Lenon	Neville Pierce	Col Pearce
1961	Western Suburbs	9–3	Manly	GF	RLN	Roger Buttenshaw	Dudley Beger	Darcy Lawler
1962	St. George	19–0	Western Suburbs	GF	RLN	Peter Armstrong	Sid Ryan	Arthur Neville
1963	St. George	5–4	South Sydney	GF		Peter Armstrong	Sid Ryan	Col Pearce
1964	St. George	7–2	South Sydney	GF	RLN	Johnny Riley	Sid Ryan	F. Erickson
1965	Balmain	9–7	St. George	GF	RLN	Jack Danzey	Leo Nosworthy	J. Harris
1966	South Sydney	12–4	Balmain	GF	RLN	Colin Dunn	"Chick" Cowie	J. Bradley
1967	Balmain	11–7	South Sydney	GF		Robert Boland	Leo Nosworthy	Laurie Bruyeres
1968	South Sydney	17–7	Manly	GF		Dennis Lee	Fred Nelson	Les Samuelson
1969	Manly	10–6	Balmain	GF		George McTaggart	Ron Willey	Keith Holman
1970	Newtown	6–0	Eastern Suburbs	GF		Robert Green	Clarrie Jeffreys	Keith Holman
1971	Canterbury	11–5	St. George	GF		Barry Phillis	Malcolm Clift	Keith Page
1972	Canterbury	14–3	St. George	GF		Barry Phillis	Malcolm Clift	Laurie Bruyeres
1973	Manly	22–14	St. George	GF		Max Krilich	Frank Stanton	Laurie Bruyeres
1974	Newtown	6–5	Eastern Suburbs	GF		Des O'Connor	Charlie Renilson	Keith Page
1975	Parramatta	21–13	Cronulla	GF		John Baker	Terry Fearnley	Keith Page
1976	St. George	17–12	Cronulla	GF		Billy Smith	Peter Dickerson	Greg Hartley
1977	Parramatta	11–9	Manly	GF		Graham Murray	Len Stacker	Jack Danzey
1978	Balmain	10–5	St. George	GF		William Hillard	Dennis Tutty	Jack Danzey
1979	Parramatta	22–2	Canterbury	GF		John Kolc	Mick Alchin	Jack Danzey
1980	Canterbury	18–16	Parramatta	GF		Mal Creavey	Geoff Connell	Jack Danzey
1981	Western Suburbs	19–2	Parramatta	GF	CT	Ian Schubert	Laurie Freier	
1982	Balmain	17–12	Eastern Suburbs	GF	CT	Bill Hilliard	Laurie Freier	
1983	South Sydney	12–6	Manly	GF	CT	Nathan Gibbs	Wally Watsford	B. Barnes
1984	Balmain	10–8	St. George	GF		Mike Marketo	Peter Duffy	C. Ward
1985	St. George	22–16	Canberra	GF	CT	George Moroko	John Bailey	Mick Stone
1986	Eastern Suburbs	10–2	Parramatta	GF		Dave Brown	Jim Morgan	Kevin Roberts
1987	Penrith	11–0	Manly	GF		Craig Izzard	Graham Murray	Greg McCallum
1988	Manly	22–2	Eastern Suburbs	GF		Peter Cullum	Alan Thompson	Graham Annesley
1989	North Sydney	11–6	Parramatta	GF	CT	Gary Maguire	Steve Martin	Mick Stone
1990	Brisbane	14–6	Canberra	GF	CT, VH	Ray Herring	Bill Gardner	Greg McCallum
1991	North Sydney	12–6	Canberra	GF	CT	Gary Smith	Peter Louis	Eddie Ward
1992	North Sydney	28–14	Balmain	GF	CT	Gary Smith	Peter Louis	Graham Annesley
1993	North Sydney	5–4	Newcastle	GF	CT	Alan Wilson	Peter Mulholland	Bill Harrigan
1994	Cronulla	14–4	Newcastle	GF		Alan Wilson	John Dykes	Bill Harrigan

== Third Grade ==
In addition to Reserve Grade, there was a Third Grade competition contested from 1908 until the 1980s.

Third Grade
Season	Premiers
1908	Sydney
1909	South Sydney Federal
1910	Sydney
1911	Leichhardt
1912	South Sydney
1913	South Sydney Federal
1914	Eastern Suburbs
1915	Balmain
1916	Balmain
1917	Eastern Suburbs
1918	South Sydney
1919	Balmain
1920	Newtown
1921	Mascot
1922	Mascot
1923	Kensington
1924	Eastern Suburbs
1925	South Sydney
1926	South Sydney
1927	Glebe
1928	South Sydney
1929	Eastern Suburbs
1930	Eastern Suburbs
1931	Eastern Suburbs
1932	Eastern Suburbs
1933	South Sydney
1934	Balmain
1935	Newtown
1936	Western Suburbs
1937	Newtown
1938	Western Suburbs
1939	Western Suburbs
1940	St. George
1941	Eastern Suburbs
1942	St. George
1943	Newtown
1944	Western Suburbs
1945	North Sydney
1946	North Sydney
1947	Eastern Suburbs
1948	Balmain
1949	St. George
1950	Balmain
1951	St. George
1952	Manly-Warringah
1953	St. George
1954	Balmain
1955	Balmain
1956	Balmain
1957	St. George
1958	Western Suburbs
1959	North Sydney
1960	Balmain
1961	Western Suburbs
1962	South Sydney
1963	St. George
1964	Parramatta
1965	St. George
1966	St. George
1967	Western Suburbs
1968	Balmain
1969	South Sydney
1970	Eastern Suburbs
1971	Canterbury
1972	St. George
1973 (U23's)	Balmain
1974 (U23's)	St. George
1975 (U23's)	Cronulla
1976 (U23's)	Eastern Suburbs
1977 (U23's)	Western Suburbs
1978 (U23's)	Penrith
1979 (U23's)	Parramatta
1980 (U23's)	Parramatta
1981 (U23's)	South Sydney
1982	Parramatta
1983	St. George
1984	Parramatta
1985 (U23's)	St. George
1986 (U23's)	South Sydney
1987 (U23's)	St. George
Merged with Presidents Cup in 1988

== See also ==
- Winfield Cup
- History of rugby league
- Rugby league in Australia
- National Rugby League
- Amco Cup
- New South Wales Cup
