= 1948 NSWRFL season =

Rugby league competition

1948 New South Wales Rugby Football League
- Teams: 10
- Premiers: Western Suburbs (3rd title)
- Minor premiers: Western Suburbs (2nd title)
- Matches played: 94
- Points scored: 2829
- Top points scorer(s): Jack Lindwall (101)
- Wooden spoon: North Sydney (6th spoon)
- Top try-scorer(s): Norm Jacobson (27)

The 1948 NSWRFL season was the forty-first New South Wales Rugby Football League premiership season, Sydney’s top-level rugby league football competition, and Australia’s first. The teams remained unchanged from the previous season, with ten clubs from across the city contesting the premiership during the season which culminated in Western Suburbs’ victory over Balmain in the grand final.

== Season summary ==
When Balmain’s young stars of 1946 and 1947 Pat Devery and Harry Bath left for big money offers in England it seemed doubtful that the Tigers would be able to continue their run of success. However Balmain gave themselves every chance to achieve their third title in a row and made it through to the Grand Final match up against Wests.

=== Teams ===
- Balmain, formed on January 23, 1908, at Balmain Town Hall
- Canterbury-Bankstown
- Eastern Suburbs, formed on January 24, 1908, at Paddington Town Hall
- Manly-Warringah
- Newtown, formed on January 14, 1908
- North Sydney, formed on February 7, 1908
- Parramatta, formed in November 1946
- South Sydney, formed on January 17, 1908, at Redfern Town Hall
- St. George, formed on November 8, 1920, at Kogarah School of Arts
- Western Suburbs, formed on February 4, 1908

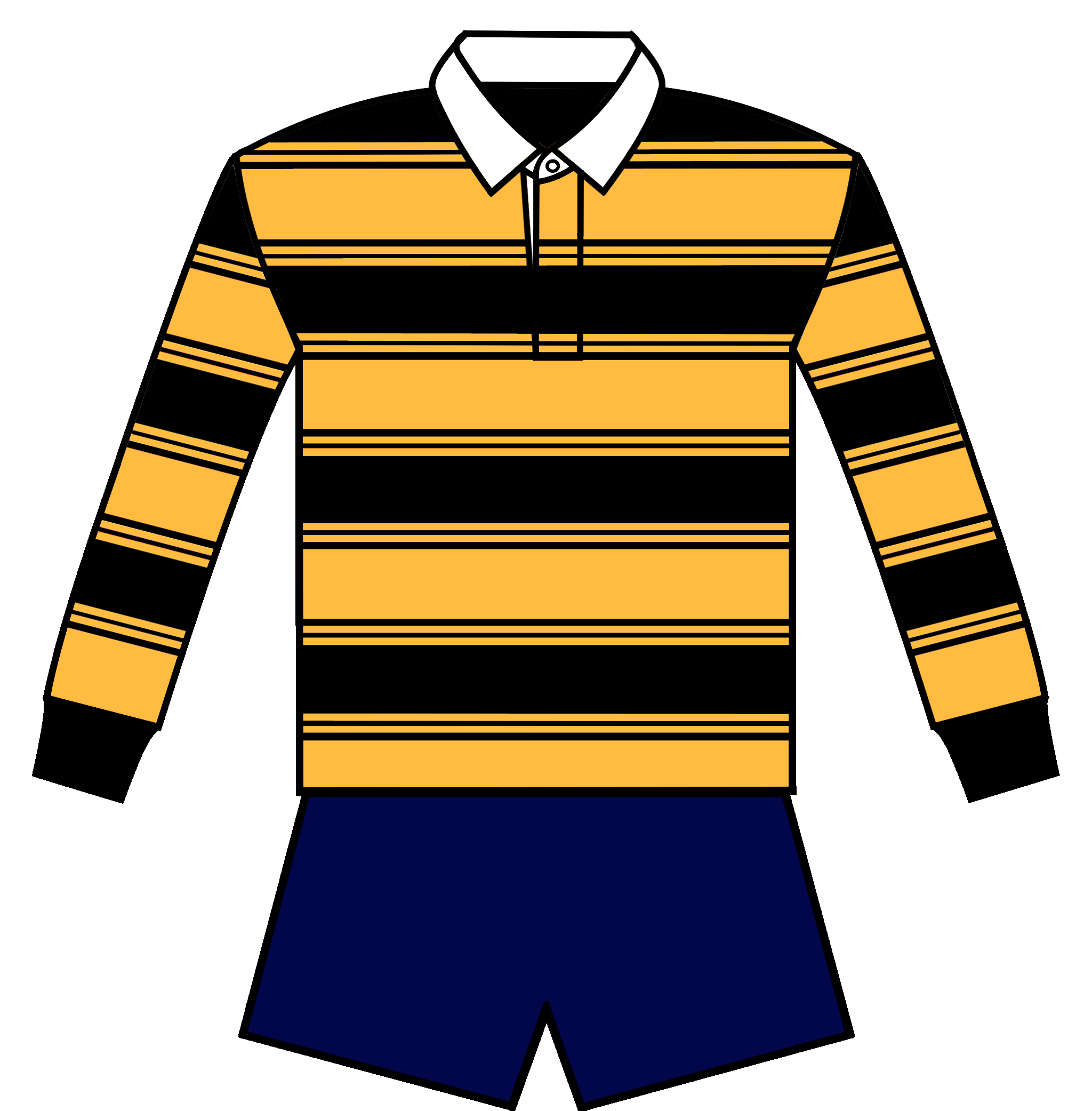
Balmain 41st season Ground: Leichhardt Oval; Coach: Athol Smith; Captain: Tom Bourke

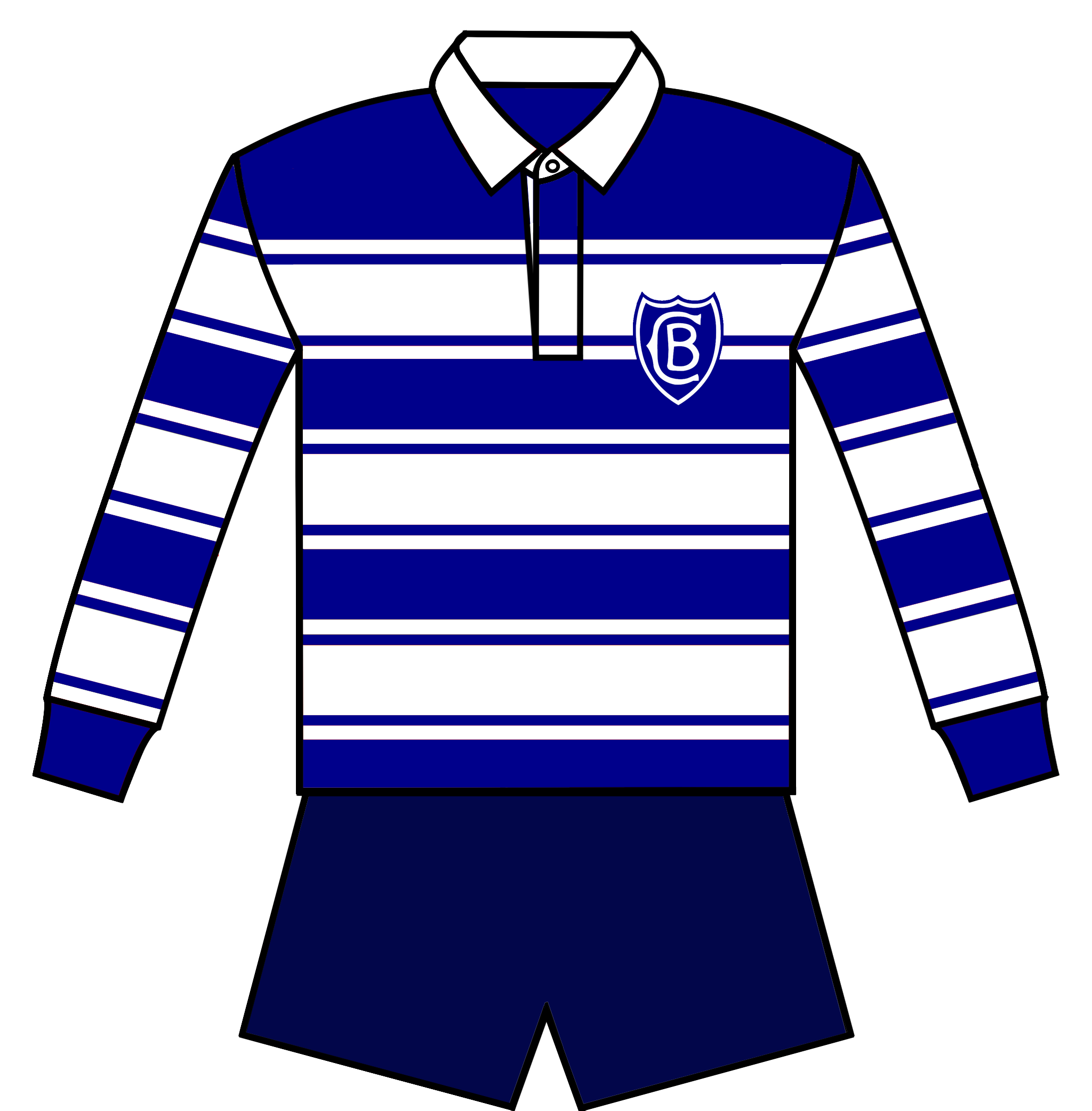
Canterbury-Bankstown 14th season Ground: Belmore Sports Ground; Coach: Arthur Halloway; Captain: Henry Porter

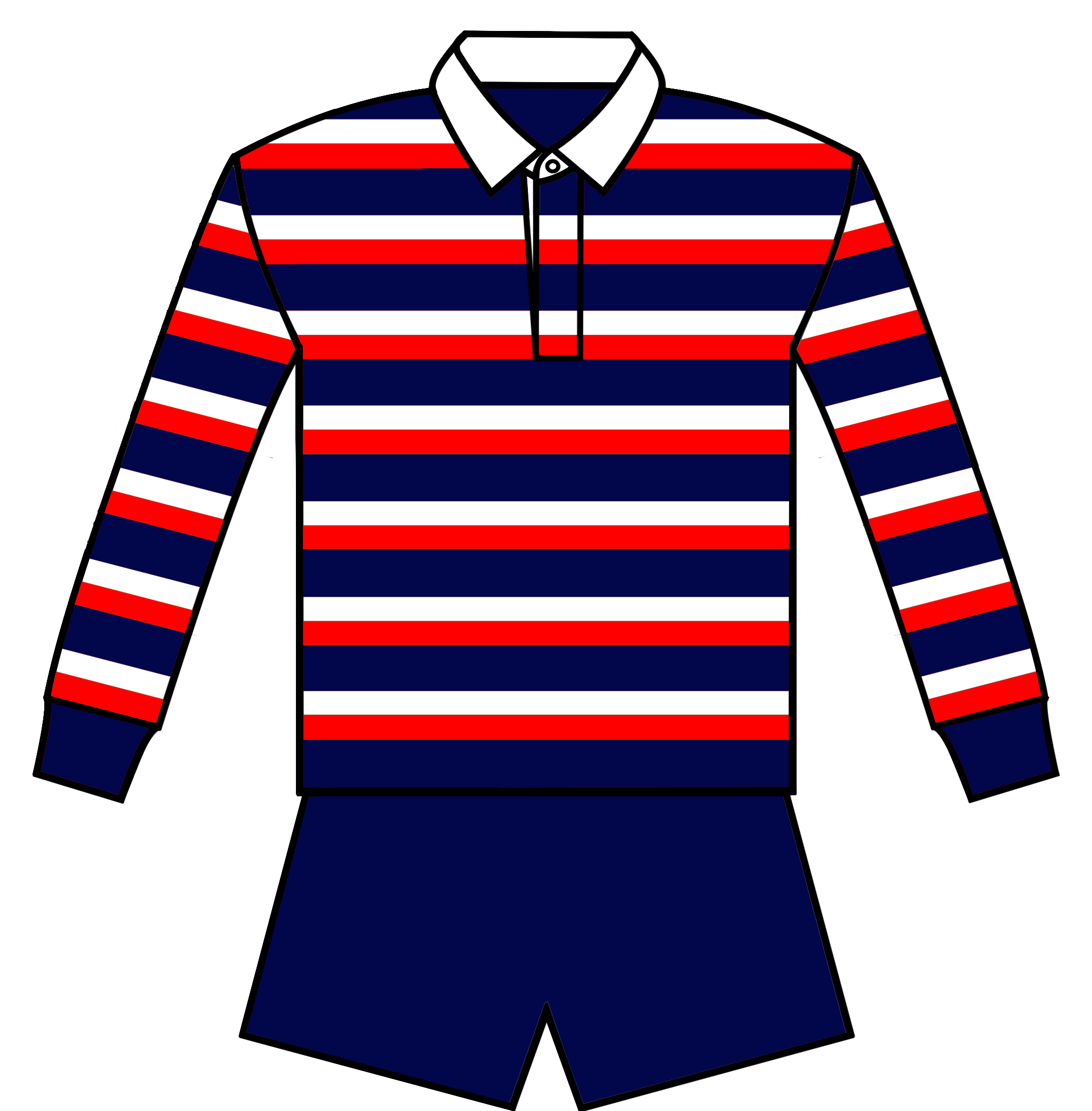
Eastern Suburbs 41st season Ground: Sydney Sports Ground; Coach: Percy Williams; Captain: Wally O'Connell

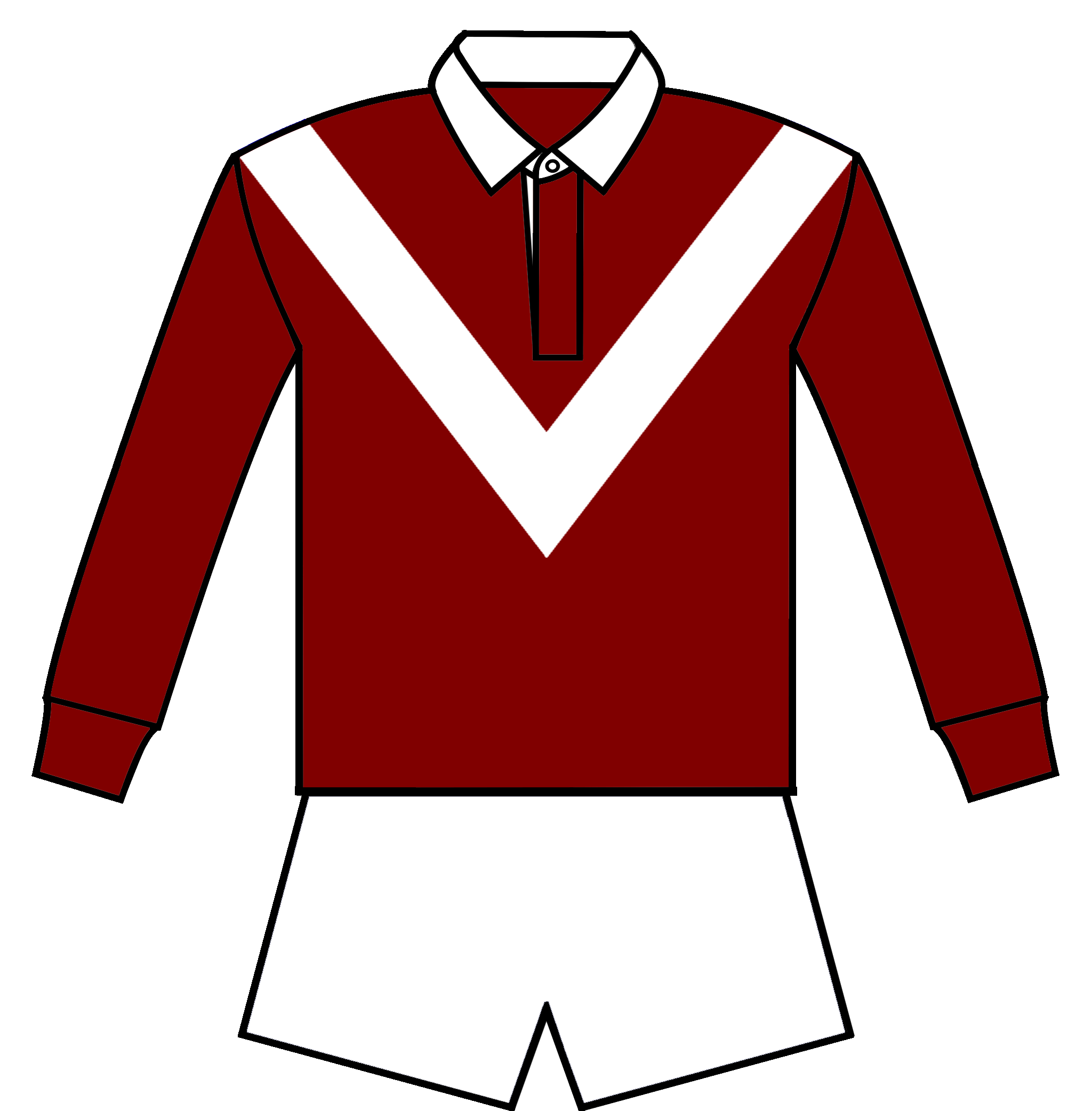
Manly-Warringah 2nd season Ground: Brookvale Oval; Coach: Ray Stehr; Captain: Ron O'Connell

Newtown 41st season Ground: Erskineville Oval; Captain-Coach: Frank Farrell

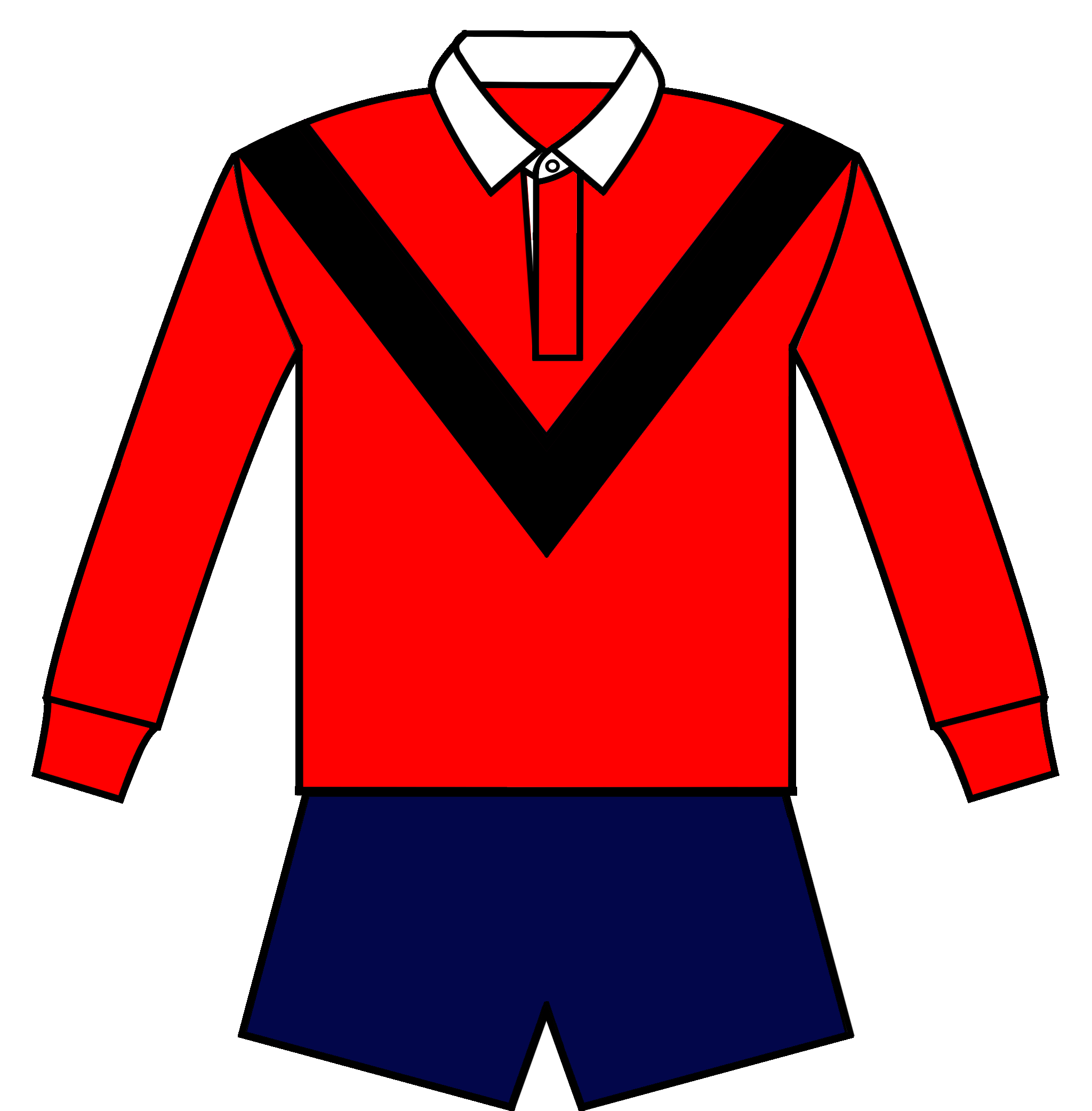
North Sydney 41st season Ground: North Sydney Oval; Coach: Cliff Pearce; Captain: Frank Cottle

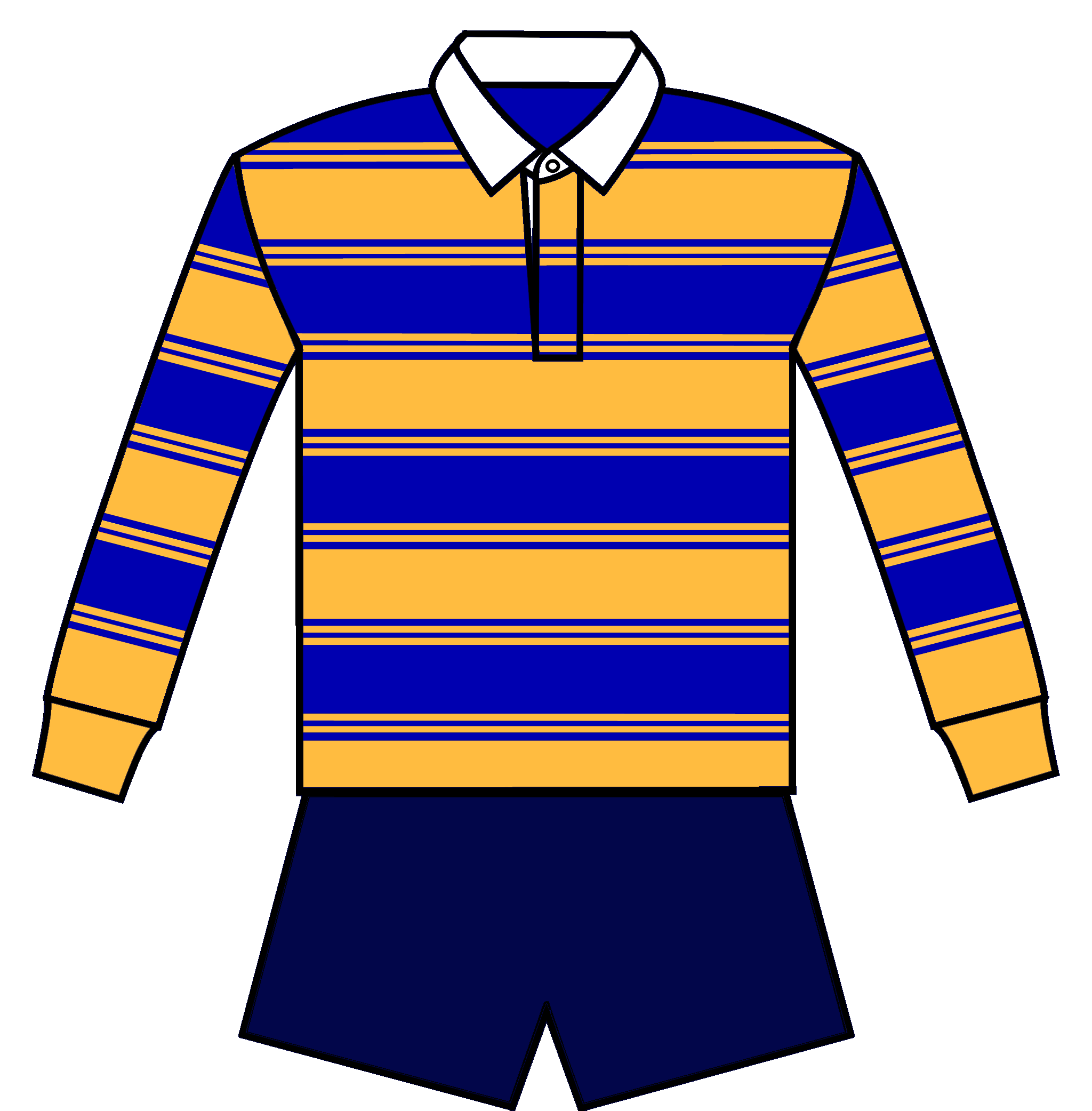
Parramatta 2nd season Ground: Cumberland Oval; Captain-coach: Vic Hey

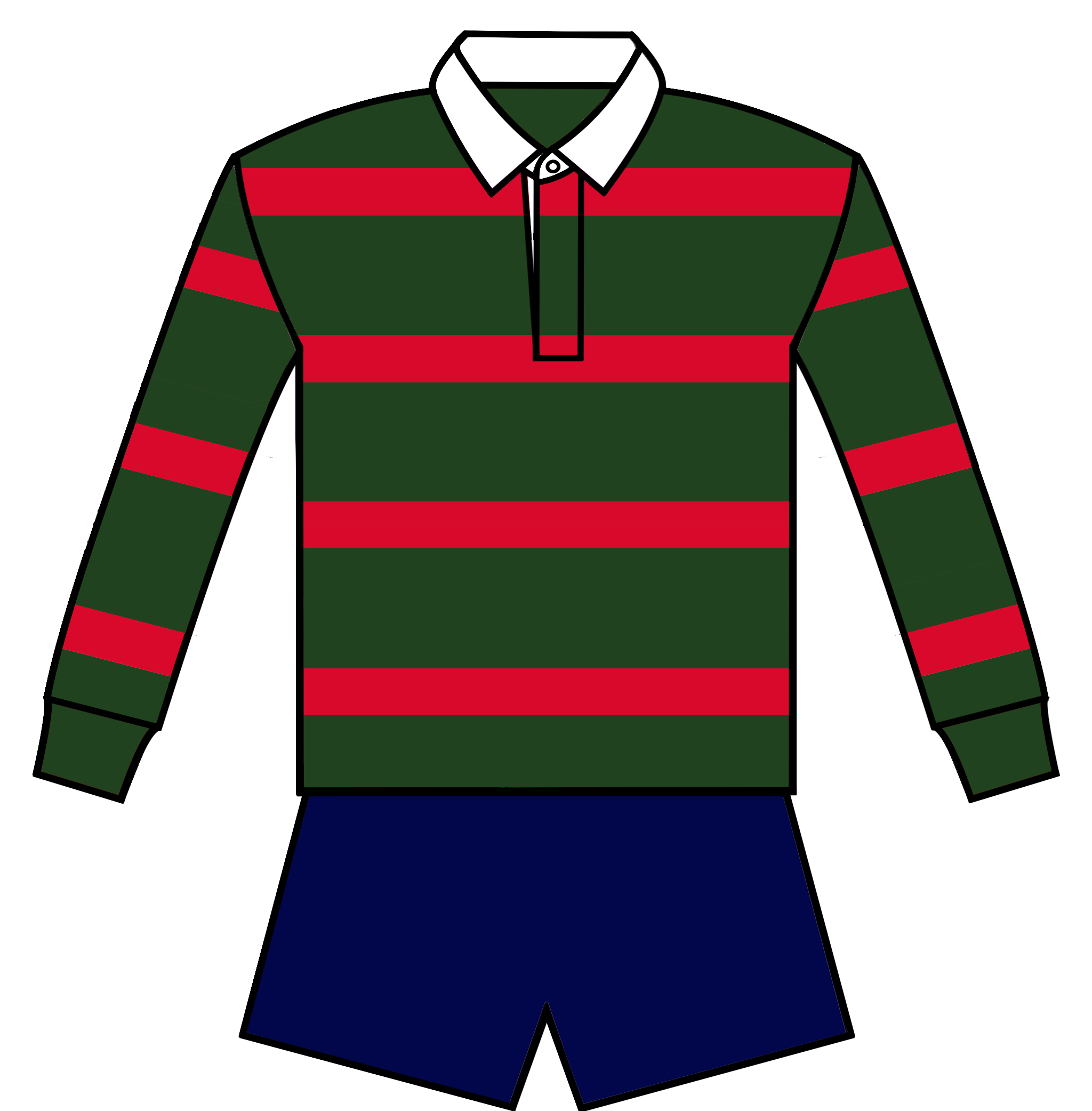
South Sydney 41st season Ground: Redfern Oval; Coach: Dave Watson; Captain: Jack Rayner

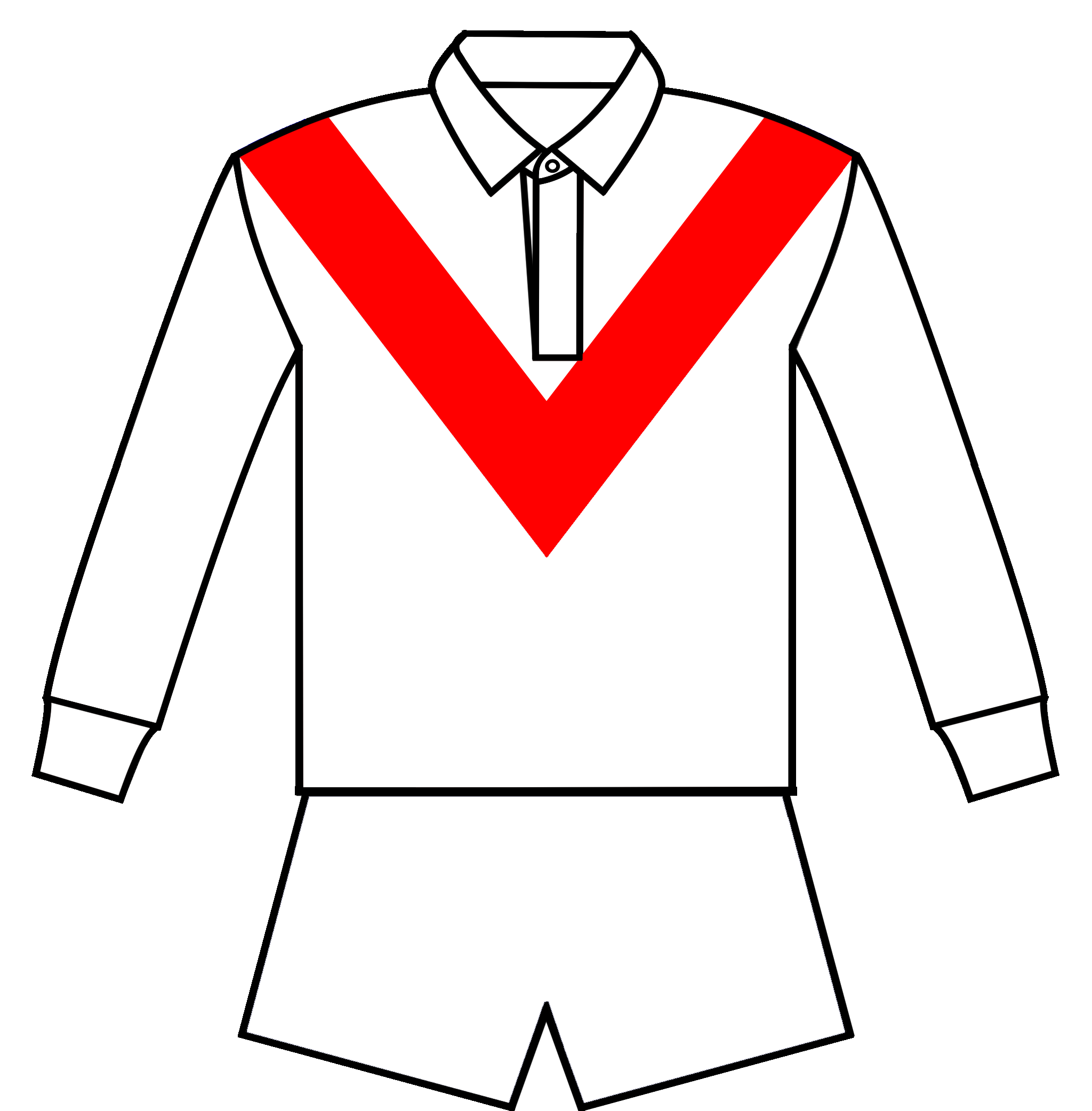
St. George 28th season Ground: Hurstville Oval; Coach: Jim Duckworth; Captain: Matt McCoy

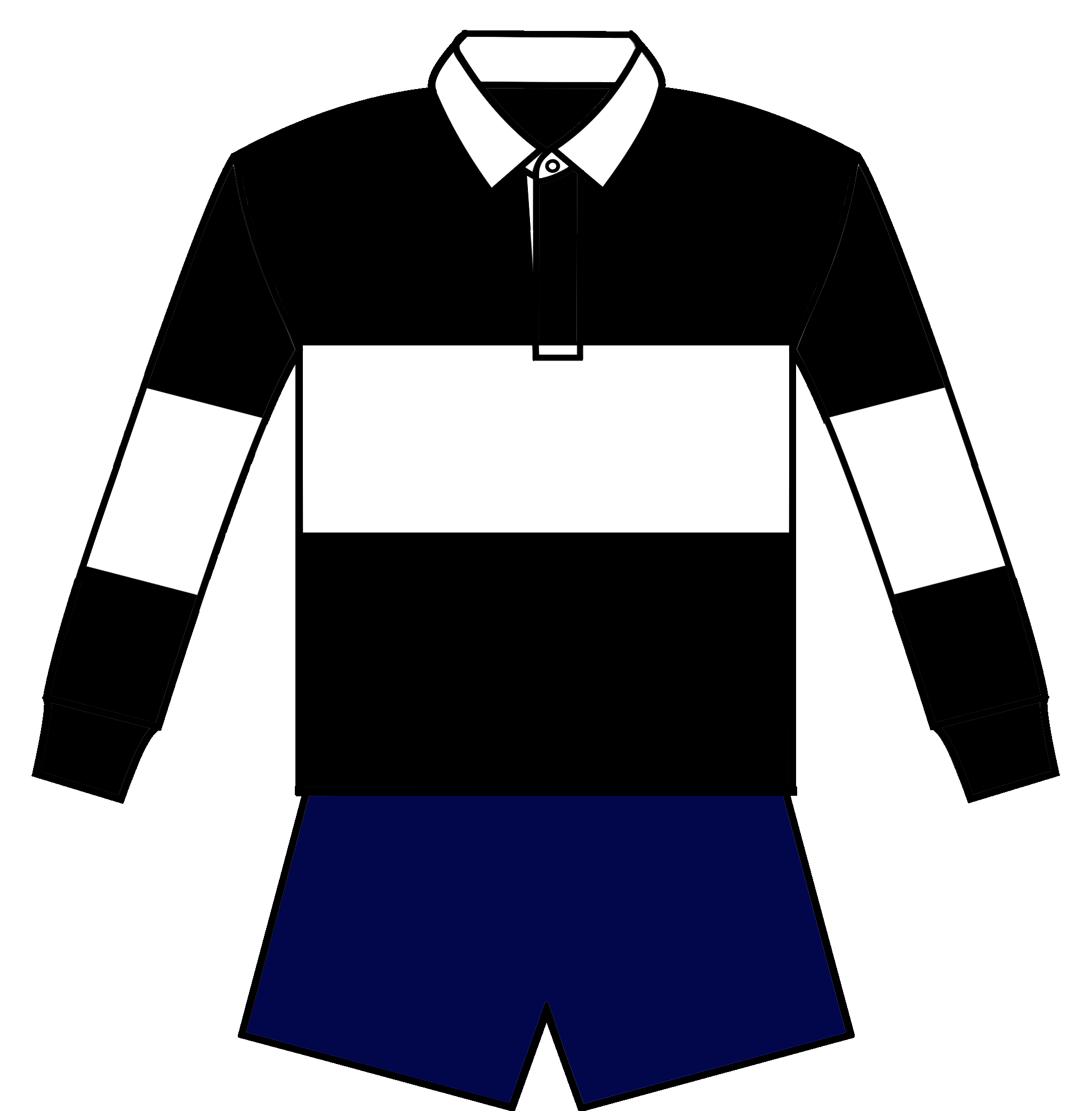
Western Suburbs 41st season Ground: Pratten Park; Coach: Jeff Smith; Captain: Jack Walsh

=== Ladder ===
| | Team | Pld | W | D | L | PF | PA | PD | Pts |
|---|---|---|---|---|---|---|---|---|---|
| 1 | Western Suburbs (P) | 18 | 16 | 0 | 2 | 322 | 189 | +133 | 32 |
| 2 | Newtown | 18 | 13 | 0 | 5 | 386 | 248 | +138 | 26 |
| 3 | Balmain | 18 | 12 | 2 | 4 | 287 | 222 | +65 | 26 |
| 4 | St. George | 18 | 10 | 1 | 7 | 332 | 262 | +70 | 21 |
| 5 | Canterbury | 18 | 7 | 2 | 9 | 282 | 276 | +6 | 16 |
| 6 | Eastern Suburbs | 18 | 7 | 2 | 9 | 225 | 248 | -23 | 16 |
| 7 | South Sydney | 18 | 7 | 1 | 10 | 265 | 302 | -37 | 15 |
| 8 | Parramatta | 18 | 5 | 1 | 12 | 237 | 346 | -109 | 11 |
| 9 | Manly | 18 | 4 | 1 | 13 | 221 | 334 | -113 | 9 |
| 10 | North Sydney | 18 | 3 | 2 | 13 | 191 | 321 | -130 | 8 |

== Finals ==
In Balmain’s preliminary final match up with St George, Balmain winger Arthur Patton refused to leave the field whilst injured as the Tigers held on to win 13–12. At game’s end it was found that he had a broken leg.

| Home | Score | Away | Match Information |
| Home | Score | Away | Date and Time | Venue | Referee | Crowd |
|---|---|---|---|---|---|---|
Semifinals
| Western Suburbs | 7–8 | Balmain | 28 August 1948 | Sydney Cricket Ground | George Bishop | 25,907 |
| Newtown | 8–20 | St. George | 4 September 1948 | Sydney Cricket Ground | Jack O'Brien | 31,310 |
Preliminary Final
| Balmain | 13–12 | St. George | 11 September 1948 | Sydney Cricket Ground | Jack O'Brien | 37,404 |
Grand Final
| Western Suburbs | 8–5 | Balmain | 18 September 1948 | Sydney Sports Ground | George Bishop | 29,122 |

=== Grand Final ===
| Western Suburbs | Position | Balmain |
|---|---|---|
| 13. William Keato | FB | 1. Dave Parkinson |
| 49. Col Hudson | WG | 30. Leo Nosworthy |
| 10. Eric Bennett | CE | 6. George Williams |
| 12. Lindsay Rodda | CE | 4. Tom Bourke (c) |
| 11. John Lackey | WG | 42. Mitchell Wallace |
| 8. Frank Stanmore | FE | 32. William Sneddon |
| 7. Neville Hogan | HB | 20. Des Bryan |
| 19. Bill Horder | PR | 10. Jim Thomson |
| 2. William Brown | HK | 45Robert Crane |
| 1. Jack Walsh (c) | PR | 8. Jack Spencer |
| 14. Kevin Hansen | SR | 12. Sid Ryan |
| 5. Don Milton | SR | 25. Pat Madden |
| 6. Peter McLean | LK | 13. Jack Hampstead |
| Jeff Smith | Coach | Athol Smith |

After rainy conditions the Grand Final was played on a soft Sydney Sports Ground surface. The Tigers led the game until the final quarter when a 40-metre run by Wests’ second rower Kevin Hansen saw him tackled right on the tryline. The referee awarded the try and Wests held an 8–5 break until full-time to record their third premiership win.

Western Suburbs Magpies 8 (Tries: Hudson, Hansen. Goals: Keato)

defeated

Balmain Tigers 5 (Tries: Bourke. Goals: Bourke)

== Player statistics ==
The following statistics are as of the conclusion of Round 18.

Top 5 point scorers

| Points | Player | Tries | Goals | Field Goals |
|---|---|---|---|---|
| 101 | Jack Lindwall | 9 | 37 | 0 |
| 94 | Colin Schomberg | 0 | 47 | 0 |
| 93 | Bill Keato | 1 | 45 | 0 |
| 92 | Oriel Kennerson | 2 | 43 | 0 |
| 81 | Norm Jacobson | 27 | 0 | 0 |

Top 5 try scorers

| Tries | Player |
|---|---|
| 27 | Norm Jacobson |
| 18 | Arthur Patton |
| 11 | Eddie Tracey |
| 11 | Len Allmond |
| 9 | Eric Bennett |
| 9 | Pat Leal |
| 9 | Len Smith |
| 9 | Jack Lindwall |

Top 5 goal scorers

| Goals | Player |
|---|---|
| 47 | Colin Schomberg |
| 45 | Bill Keato |
| 43 | Oriel Kennerson |
| 37 | Jack Lindwall |
| 33 | Joe Jorgenson |
