= List of NSWRL/ARL/SL/NRL premiership captains and coaches =

This is a list of captains and coaches of National Rugby League premiership winning teams, as well as its predecessors NSWRL, ARL and Super League. Ken Kearney has captained the most premierships with six, all at St. George, while Arthur Halloway has coached the most premierships with eight, four at Eastern Suburbs and four at Balmain.

Up until the late 1960s, teams often had captain-coaches who would play and coach at the same time. In this list, they are counted as both the captain and the coach.

== List ==
Year	Premiers	Captain	Coach
2026	Sydney Roosters (16)	James Tedesco	Trent Robinson (4)
2025	Brisbane (7)	Adam Reynolds	Michael Maguire (2)
2024	Penrith (6)	Nathan Cleary (4)	Ivan Cleary (4)
2024	Penrith (6)	Isaah Yeo (4)	Ivan Cleary (4)
2023	Penrith (5)	Nathan Cleary (3)	Ivan Cleary (3)
2023	Penrith (5)	Isaah Yeo (3)	Ivan Cleary (3)
2022	Penrith (4)	Nathan Cleary (2)	Ivan Cleary (2)
2022	Penrith (4)	Isaah Yeo (2)	Ivan Cleary (2)
2021	Penrith (3)	Nathan Cleary	Ivan Cleary
2021	Penrith (3)	Isaah Yeo	Ivan Cleary
2020	Melbourne (4)	Cameron Smith (3)	Craig Bellamy (3)
2019	Sydney Roosters (15)	Boyd Cordner (2)	Trent Robinson (3)
2019	Sydney Roosters (15)	Jake Friend (2)	Trent Robinson (3)
2018	Sydney Roosters (14)	Boyd Cordner	Trent Robinson (2)
2018	Sydney Roosters (14)	Jake Friend	Trent Robinson (2)
2017	Melbourne (3)	Cameron Smith (2)	Craig Bellamy (2)
2016	Cronulla	Paul Gallen	Shane Flanagan
2015	North Queensland	Johnathan Thurston	Paul Green
2015	North Queensland	Matthew Scott	Paul Green
2014	South Sydney (21)	John Sutton	Michael Maguire
2013	Sydney Roosters (13)	Anthony Minichiello	Trent Robinson
2012	Melbourne (2)	Cameron Smith	Craig Bellamy
2011	Manly Warringah (8)	Jamie Lyon	Des Hasler (2)
2010	St George Illawarra	Ben Hornby	Wayne Bennett (7)
2009	~~Melbourne~~	~~Cameron Smith~~	~~Craig Bellamy~~
2008	Manly Warringah (7)	Matt Orford	Des Hasler
2007	~~Melbourne~~	~~Cameron Smith~~	~~Craig Bellamy~~
2006	Brisbane (6)	Darren Lockyer	Wayne Bennett (6)
2005	Wests Tigers	Scott Prince	Tim Sheens (4)
2004	Canterbury	Andrew Ryan	Steve Folkes
2003	Penrith (2)	Craig Gower	John Lang
2002	Sydney Roosters (12)	Brad Fittler	Ricky Stuart
2001	Newcastle (2)	Andrew Johns	Michael Hagan
2000	Brisbane (5)	Kevin Walters	Wayne Bennett (5)
1999	Melbourne	Glenn Lazarus	Chris Anderson (2)
1998	Brisbane (4)	Allan Langer (4)	Wayne Bennett (4)
1997 (ARL)	Newcastle	Paul Harragon	Mal Reilly
1997 (SL)	Brisbane (3)	Allan Langer (3)	Wayne Bennett (3)
1996	Manly Warringah (6)	Geoff Toovey	Bob Fulton (2)
1995	Canterbury (7)	Terry Lamb	Chris Anderson
1994	Canberra (3)	Mal Meninga (3)	Tim Sheens (3)
1993	Brisbane (2)	Allan Langer (2)	Wayne Bennett (2)
1992	Brisbane	Allan Langer	Wayne Bennett
1991	Penrith	Greg Alexander	Phil Gould (2)
1990	Canberra (2)	Mal Meninga (2)	Tim Sheens (2)
1989	Canberra	Mal Meninga	Tim Sheens
1988	Canterbury (6)	Peter Tunks	Phil Gould
1987	Manly Warringah (5)	Paul Vautin	Bob Fulton
1986	Parramatta (6)	Ray Price	John Monie
1985	Canterbury (5)	Steve Mortimer (2)	Warren Ryan (2)
1984	Canterbury (4)	Steve Mortimer	Warren Ryan
1983	Parramatta (3)	Steve Edge (4)	Jack Gibson (5)
1982	Parramatta (2)	Steve Edge (3)	Jack Gibson (4)
1981	Parramatta	Steve Edge (2)	Jack Gibson (3)
1980	Canterbury (3)	George Peponis	Ted Glossop
1979	St. George (15)	Craig Young	Harry Bath (2)
1978	Manly Warringah (4)	Max Krilich	Frank Stanton (2)
1977	St. George (14)	Steve Edge	Harry Bath
1976	Manly Warringah (3)	Bob Fulton	Frank Stanton
1975	Eastern Suburbs (11)	Arthur Beetson (2)	Jack Gibson (2)
1974	Eastern Suburbs (10)	Arthur Beetson	Jack Gibson
1973	Manly Warringah (2)	Fred Jones (2)	Ron Willey (2)
1972	Manly Warringah	Fred Jones	Ron Willey
1971	South Sydney (20)	John Sattler (4)	Clive Churchill (4)
1970	South Sydney (19)	John Sattler (3)	Clive Churchill (3)
1969	Balmain (11)	Peter Provan	Leo Nosworthy
1968	South Sydney (18)	John Sattler (2)	Clive Churchill (2)
1967	South Sydney (17)	John Sattler	Clive Churchill
1966	St. George (13)	Ian Walsh	Ian Walsh
1965	St. George (12)	Norm Provan (4)	Norm Provan (4)
1964	St. George (11)	Norm Provan (3)	Norm Provan (3)
1963	St. George (10)	Norm Provan (2)	Norm Provan (2)
1962	St. George (9)	Norm Provan	Norm Provan
1961	St. George (8)	Billy Wilson	Ken Kearney (5)
1960	St. George (7)	Ken Kearney (5)	Ken Kearney (4)
1959	St. George (6)	Ken Kearney (4)	Ken Kearney (3)
1958	St. George (5)	Ken Kearney (3)	Ken Kearney (2)
1957	St. George (4)	Ken Kearney (2)	Ken Kearney
1956	St. George (3)	Ken Kearney	Norm Tipping
1955	South Sydney (16)	Jack Rayner (5)	Jack Rayner (5)
1954	South Sydney (15)	Jack Rayner (4)	Jack Rayner (4)
1953	South Sydney (14)	Jack Rayner (3)	Jack Rayner (3)
1952	Western Suburbs (4)	Peter McLean	Tom McMahon
1951	South Sydney (13)	Jack Rayner (2)	Jack Rayner (2)
1950	South Sydney (12)	Jack Rayner	Jack Rayner
1949	St. George (2)	Johnny Hawke	Jim Duckworth
1948	Western Suburbs (3)	Jack Walsh	Jeff Smith
1947	Balmain (10)	Tom Bourke (2)	Norm Robinson (3)
1946	Balmain (9)	Tom Bourke	Norm Robinson (2)
1945	Eastern Suburbs (9)	Ray Stehr (3)	Arthur Halloway (8)
1944	Balmain (8)	Arthur Patton	Norm Robinson
1943	Newtown (3)	Frank Farrell	Arthur Folwell
1942	Canterbury (2)	Ron Bailey	Jerry Brien
1941	St. George	Neville Smith	Neville Smith
1940	Eastern Suburbs (8)	Ray Stehr (2)	Dave Brown
1939	Balmain (7)	Sid Goodwin	Bill Kelly (2)
1938	Canterbury	Alan Brady	Jim Craig (2)
1937	Eastern Suburbs (7)	Viv Thicknesse	Arthur Halloway (7)
1936	Eastern Suburbs (6)	Dave Brown	Arthur Halloway (6)
1935	Eastern Suburbs (5)	Ray Stehr	Arthur Halloway (5)
1934	Western Suburbs (2)	Frank McMillan	Frank McMillan
1933	Newtown (2)	Keith Ellis	Charles Russell
1932	South Sydney (11)	George Treweek	Charlie Lynch (4)
1931	South Sydney (10)	Pat Maher	Charlie Lynch (3)
1930	Western Suburbs	Jim Craig	Jim Craig
1929	South Sydney (9)	Alf Blair (4)	Charlie Lynch (2)
1928	South Sydney (8)	Jim Breen	Charlie Lynch
1927	South Sydney (7)	Alf Blair (3)	Alf Blair
1926	South Sydney (6)	Alf Blair (2)	Howard Hallett (3)
1925	South Sydney (5)	Alf Blair	Howard Hallett (2)
1924	Balmain (6)	Charles Fraser	Charles Fraser
1923	Eastern Suburbs (4)	Harry Caples	Ray Norman
1922	North Sydney (2)	Duncan Thompson	Chris McKivat (2)
1921	North Sydney	Harold Horder	Chris McKivat
1920	Balmain (5)	Arthur Halloway (4)	Arthur Halloway (4)
1919	Balmain (4)	Arthur Halloway (3)	Arthur Halloway (3)
1918	South Sydney (4)	Howard Hallett	Arthur Hennessy (3)
1917	Balmain (3)	Arthur Halloway (2)	Arthur Halloway (2)
1916	Balmain (2)	Arthur Halloway	Arthur Halloway
1915	Balmain	Bill Kelly	Bill Kelly
1914	South Sydney (3)	Arthur Butler	Howard Hallett
1913	Eastern Suburbs (3)	Dally Messenger (3)	Dally Messenger (3)
1912	Eastern Suburbs (2)	Dally Messenger (2)	Dally Messenger (2)
1911	Eastern Suburbs	Dally Messenger	Dally Messenger
1910	Newtown	Charles Russell	Charles Russell
1909	South Sydney (2)	Arthur Conlin (2)	Arthur Hennessy (2)
1908	South Sydney	Arthur Conlin	Arthur Hennessy

== See also ==
- List of NRL Women's captains and coaches
- List of current NRL coaches
- List of VFL/AFL premiership captains and coaches
