= History of the Parramatta Eels =

The history of the Parramatta Eels dates back to their formation as the Parramatta District Rugby League Football Club in 1947 to the present day.

== Background ==
The roots of the playing of rugby football in Parramatta lie in the 19th century with the formation of Parramatta FC in 1879 which featured regularly in Sydney competitions. The King's School in Parramatta helped found the New South Wales Rugby Union in 1874 and provided many prominent footballers. As with most other rugby union clubs in Sydney in 1900, Parramatta FC was made defunct to make way for the new district clubs.The town spent the pre-war (1900-14) as the "third wheel" of the Ashfield and Burwood centred Western Suburbs District Rugby Union Club, and while some matches were played at Cumberland Oval, it was not given its own first grade district club until 1934 (Parramatta 'Two Blues')

When the NSWRL Premiership was formed in 1908, a club made up of Western Suburbs Rugby Union “defectors” formed the Central Cumberland club which participated in the first year of competition before the club was absorbed into the Western Suburbs DRLFC, also formed in 1908. Rugby league began to be played in the Parramatta district in 1909 with local teams, such as Iona and Endeavours, forming a district competition. Many other clubs within the Parramatta district also emerged with clubs being established in suburbs across the district over the ensuing decades and a Western Districts side representing the area in the President's Cup.

Agitation in the area for a local club to participate in the NSWRL Premiership began in the mid-1930s with a formal proposal put to the NSWRL in 1936 by local Rugby League identities such as Jack Argent and Jack Scullin. The proposal was rejected by all clubs except Western Suburbs.

== 1940s ==
The advent of World War II put the establishment of the club on hold and a Parramatta district club was not proposed again until 1946 when the club was successfully admitted into the Premiership.

In the 1947 NSWRFL season, Parramatta's first, they finished at the bottom of the table, with one less win than fellow premiership debutants, Manly-Warringah. In 1948, Parramatta were winless in their first eleven matches but the signing of former Western Suburbs and Leeds five-eighth Vic Hey as captain-coach helped them to eighth with five wins and a draw. In 1949, with popular former Balmain winger Mitchell Wallace setting tryscoring records beaten only during their golden age of the 1980s, the “Fruitpickers” as the club was popularly known, finished fifth with eight wins and four draws. The club also saw utility back Ian Johnston win its first Australian guernsey.

== 1950s ==
The promise of 1949 was not fulfilled during the 1950s. Hey had been plagued by injury in his first two years at the club and retired as a player after 1949, with the result that Parramatta fell back to ninth in 1950 before winning nine matches in 1951.

In their first five seasons, Parramatta had won 28 and drawn eight of their ninety matches for a not disrespectful 35.56 percent winning rate, but the period from 1952 to 1961 was to prove the most disastrous of any NSWRFL club since University won only fifteen matches in nine seasons between 1929 and 1937. In these seasons, Parramatta won only 35 and drew two of 180 matches and claimed the wooden spoon on no fewer than eight occasions, including six in succession from 1956 to 1961. After Hey moved on at the end of 1953 Parramatta went on a merry-go-round with coaches: they had five in as many years from 1954 to 1958, and even former Rabbitoh premiership coach Jack Rayner could not lift them off the bottom between 1958 and 1960.

Apart from the recruitments of international backrower “Mick” Crocker for a then-record single-season fee in 1954 and prized Yass hooker Bill Rayner in 1956, Parramatta was almost completely reliant upon local juniors and not nearly enough quality players could be found for competitiveness; however, there were notable players like hardman prop Roy Fisher, who played a record 170 consecutive grade games between 1954 and 1962.

== 1960s ==
1960 was to prove the most disastrous season in Parramatta's history, with the club, despite the recruitment of Toowoomba centre Ron Boden, finishing last in all three grades. 1961 saw the acquisition of international back-rowers Ron Lynch from Forbes in country NSW and Brian Hambly from South Sydney, but the blue and golds, despite a promising start under captain-coach Boden with two early victories, won only one more game and returned to their familiar place at the foot of the ladder.

Under coach Ken Kearney, Parramatta ended their run of six consecutive wooden spoons by finishing the 1962 NSWRFL season in fourth place, making the play-offs for the first time and emulating this feat in the lower grades. With new recruits Ken Thornett (who became known as “The Mayor”) from English club Leeds and talented half-back Bob Bugden from St George, Parramatta had their most successful season since their inception before being eliminated from the finals in the first round by Western Suburbs.

Despite the addition of skilful second-row forward Dick Thornett for 1963, ultimate success would continue to elude Parramatta with the side being knocked out of the 1963 finals by St George. Finishing second in 1964 Parramatta were thrashed 42–0 by the Dragons in the major semi-final, before being knocked out by Balmain; their Third Grade team did however win the club's first premiership. In the 1965 season, with Ken Thornett as coach, the side finished in third position. However, Grand Final qualification would continue to elude them and Parramatta would again bow out of the finals, this time defeated by South Sydney. Parramatta completed the rest of the 1960s in the middle of the ladder, without any further play-off appearances, finishing seventh in 1966, ninth in 1967, and sixth in 1968 and 1969.

== 1970s ==
Parramatta finished with the wooden spoon, the club's tenth, in 1970, but with Ken Thornett returning finished fourth and again qualified for the play-offs in 1971. However, Parramatta again failed to progress in the minor semi, being defeated by St George, and fell back to last position in 1972 despite possessing class players like Bob O'Reilly, Denis Fitzgerald, and Keith Campbell. The Eels luckily avoided the wooden spoon in 1973 and 1974, but began the 1975 season by winning its first-ever senior trophy when they defeated Manly in their first-ever Pre-Season Cup (Wills Cup) final.

In the main premiership, Parramatta after a promising start fell off, losing seven and drawing one of nine games mid-season. A rush in the last six weeks saw them easily win five games to finished equal fifth (sixth on percentages) with Balmain and Western Suburbs (Note: Wests were actually half a win ahead but were docked one match point for playing a replacement player who had not played the full reserve grade match as was required at the time.) and were forced into a play-off for fifth position. Parramatta, on a roll, achieved a string of elimination play-off victories, defeating Western Suburbs (18–13) and then Balmain (19–8) to qualify for the semi-finals in fifth position. Parramatta played Canterbury-Bankstown in the preliminary final, achieving another narrow victory 6–5. However, in the minor semi-final Parramatta's courageous run of victories – achieved despite crippling injury toll – ended with a 22–12 defeat by Manly.

In 1976 a new coach, Terry Fearnley, joined the Eels. In the same year several of Parramatta's greatest players joined the club. These included Rugby union recruit and 1975 Wallaby tourist, Ray Price who would go on to represent both NSW and Australia in Rugby league. Another new recruit was five-eighth John Peard. Nicknamed “the Bomber”, Peard was encouraged by Terry Fearnley to develop his tactical kicking game (the “bomb”) as an attacking technique. As the 1976 season progressed Parramatta emerged as one of the best performing sides, finishing second in the competition. In the major preliminary semi-final, Parramatta decisively defeated St George 31–6 and met Manly in the major semi final. In a close match, Parramatta narrowly defeated the Sea-Eagles with a late try to winger Graeme Atkins (who scored from a Peard bomb) and qualified for the club's first Grand Final. In the Grand Final, against the same Manly side they had defeated two weeks before, Parramatta were trailing 13–10 after 71 minutes. Receiving a penalty five metres from the goal line, the Eels formed a controversial flying wedge formation (now a banned movement in both Rugby codes) and pushed towards the goal line. The wedge collapsed before the goal line and Parramatta's Ron Hilditch, who held the ball at the apex of the wedge, was tackled by Manly's Graham Eadie and the match ended with the scores unaltered.

Bolstered with the recruitment of goal-kicking Australian representative centre Mick Cronin Parramatta finished as minor premiers in 1977. Meeting St George in the Grand Final, the scores ended at 9-all after a powerful Ray Price line-break lead to a try. Cronin missed the final conversion that would have broken the tied scores. After a period of extra time passed with the scores unchanged the two sides met in a replay the next weekend. In the replay, Parramatta were defeated 22–0.

The next season, 1978, saw both the debut of future champion half-back Peter Sterling and the emergence of former representative player, Denis Fitzgerald, as President/CEO of the club (a position he held until 2009). Parramatta qualified for the finals but were controversially denied progression in controversial circumstances. After the first minor semi-final ended in a 13–13 draw, a replay was required and Parramatta were defeated 17–11, but Manly appeared to have scored the winning try on the seventh tackle. In 1979, Parramatta made it to the major semi-final but were defeated by St George 15–11 and lost the preliminary to Canterbury 20–14.

== 1980s ==
In 1980, despite the recruitment of veteran Arthur Beetson and the emergence of notable players such as Eric Grothe, Steve Ella and Brett Kenny, Parramatta missed the finals for the first time since 1974.

Parramatta, under coach Jack Gibson, finished third in the competition and began their finals campaign with a major preliminary semi against Newtown Jets whom they narrowly defeated 10–8. An extra time victory over minor Premiers Eastern Suburbs 12–8 followed and Parramatta qualified for the club's third Grand Final. Playing against Newtown, Parramatta led the Grand Final at half time, 7–6. A try to Newtown captain Tommy Raudonikis soon after half-time gave Newtown an 11–7 lead. However, Parramatta responded with a try to winger Graeme Atkins. Michael Cronin was able to convert the try and in the final five minutes of the match the Eels scored twice more to seal a 20–11 victory and their first-ever Premiership. In Parramatta, a large crowd of supporters greeted the team as they arrived back at the Leagues Club (situated adjacent to Cumberland Oval). The already condemned grandstand and scoreboard at the Oval was set alight during the celebration by supporters and destroyed.

The following year, with Cumberland Oval unavailable, Parramatta played home matches at Canterbury-Bankstown's Belmore Oval and finished the season as minor premiers. With a then-record 619 points and 21 victories, 1982 was statistically the club's most successful season. In the major semi-final Parramatta were defeated by Manly 20–0, which allowed Manly to qualify for the Grand Final. With a second chance, Parramatta rebounded in an extremely wet preliminary final to defeat Eastern Suburbs 33–0 and qualified to play Manly in the Grand Final. This qualification would continue the developing rivalry that the two clubs had developed since the 1970s. On Grand Final day, despite conceding the first try, Parramatta scored four tries before the half-time break. Manly's Les Boyd scored soon after the break, though it was their last try of the match and with Brett Kenny scoring in the sixtieth minute Parramatta recorded a 21–8 victory and a second consecutive premiership.

Parramatta finished second in the 1983 Premiership season, and opened the finals with a 30–22 win over Canterbury before being defeated by Manly-Warringah in the major semi-final, however the Eels defeated Canterbury in the Preliminary Final to qualify for another Grand Final against Manly. In the Grand Final Parramatta built a 12–0 half-time lead, which Brett Kenny extended after half-time and, with Cronin's conversion, the Eels lead 18–0 and ultimately won 18–6. Parramatta's third consecutive premiership was the first treble in the NSWRFL Premiership since St George's domination of the 1950s and 1960s.

Jack Gibson departed after the 1983 season and was replaced by former Cronulla and Woy Woy Roosters five-eighth John Monie. Under Monie Parramatta qualified for their fourth Grand Final in a row in 1984 after an 8–7 defeat of St George in the final. Parramatta faced minor premiers Canterbury-Bankstown who had defeated the Eels the week before, 16–8 to qualify for the Grand Final. The Grand Final was a low-scoring affair, with the Bulldogs defeating Parramatta 6–4. The Eels finished fourth in 1985 and, with defeats of Penrith and Balmain in the final series, progressed to the Preliminary Final against Canterbury-Bankstown with a chance to qualify for a fifth straight Grand Final. However, Parramatta were defeated 26–0 and Canterbury-Bankstown would go on to win the Grand Final.

Parramatta, playing out of the newly opened Stadium, finished minor premiers and qualified for the Grand Final with a 28–6 victory over Canterbury-Bankstown in the Finals. The Bulldogs defeated Balmain to qualify for another Grand Final against Parramatta. The Grand Final would end without either side scoring a try, the first time this had happened in the history of the competition. Two successful goal attempts by Michael Cronin gave the Eels a 4–2 victory. Both Michael Cronin and Ray Price chose to make the Grand Final victory their last game in Rugby league and both retired from the game.

There’s no doubt Parramatta have the biggest following in our game.

— John Quayle, NSWRL General Manager at the end of the 1987 season

Between 1987 and 1996 the Eels failed to make the finals. Parramatta finished seventh in 1987, eleventh in 1988, and eighth in 1989. The old stars remained at the club, but injuries plagued all of them, especially Grothe and Geoff Bugden, whilst the cost of retaining Kenny and Sterling under the new salary cap had the effect of forcing the club to discard large numbers of promising juniors. Their only notable recruit, star Queensland backrower Bob Lindner, stayed only two seasons before moving to the Gold Coast.

== 1990s ==
The first half of the 1990s continued this trend with notable players, such as Brett Kenny and Peter Sterling, retiring from the game. Parramatta were completely unable to replace players of this calibre via recruiting and consequently struggled. Coach John Monie departed at the end of the 1989 season and was replaced by Michael Cronin. In 1990, Parramatta finished eighth and Sterling in his last full season won his second Rothmans Medal, but in 1991 and 1992 the club descended in the rankings, only narrowly avoiding the “wooden spoon” in the latter season. In 1993, the Eels finished eleventh after a promising start and then in 1994 under new coach Ron Hilditch, twelfth.

1995 proved the Eels worst season since 1960, with the club finishing second last with only three wins in first grade, last in reserve grade and last in the club championship. Players from this era included current Hull Kingston Rovers coach Justin Morgan, injury-plagued Country Origin representative centre David Woods, Lee Oudenryn (who beat Martin Offiah in a half-time footrace in Great Britain’s 1992 tour match with Parramatta) and former Australian representative Paul Dunn. Other players of this era who would go on to play with other clubs included utility back Chris Lawler (who went to the Gold Coast Chargers), Garen Casey (Penrith Panthers) and Scott Mahon (North Queensland Cowboys).

=== Super League ===
The “Super League war” that began in 1995 provided an opportunity for Parramatta to recruit notable players from other clubs. As players and clubs aligned with either the ARL or the Super League competitions, various players became dislodged from their clubs. Parramatta, aligning with the ARL, were able to recruit ARL-aligned players from Super League-aligned clubs. This led to Parramatta signing star players Dean Pay, Jason Smith, Jim Dymock and Jarrod McCracken, from 1995 premiers Canterbury Bulldogs, alongside Aaron Raper and Adam Ritson from Cronulla. Parramatta entered the 1996 season with a squad comprising not only these notable Super League defectors, but also New Zealand international half-back Gary Freeman. However, despite these recruits, the Eels again failed to make the semi-finals. Parramatta spent most of the season in the lower reaches of, or just outside, a finals position. The Eels made a late challenge for final qualification, which included a Round 19 defeat of the Newcastle Knights in front of a home crowd of 21,191 (the largest Parramatta Stadium attendance since 1986). However, the blue and golds lost three consecutive matches to end the season in thirteenth position.

The 1997 season saw the recruitment of a new coach, former St George Dragons coach Brian Smith. The appointment of Brian Smith saw a reversal in Parramatta's fortunes with the Club finishing in third place and making the Australian Rugby League semi-finals in 1997 for the first time since 1986. Parramatta lost both its finals matches to Newcastle Knights and North Sydney in the Major Qualifying Final to exit from the series. The same scenario would reoccur in 1998 (4th), 1999 (2nd) and 2000 (7th) with Parramatta failing to qualify for the Grand Final on each occasion. In the 1998 preliminary final Parramatta were leading arch rivals Canterbury 18–2 with less than 10 minutes to play and then what can only be described as the greatest choke in Rugby League preliminary finals history occurred. Canterbury managed to fight their way back into the match and with a minute left on the scoreboard, winger Daryl Halligan kicked a conversion from out on the far touchline to send the game into extra time. Canterbury won in extra time 32–20. The loss was hard to take for Parramatta as they had beaten eventual premiers Brisbane twice during the regular season. In 1999, Parramatta led Melbourne 16–0 at halftime in the preliminary final only to lose 18–16 at full time. Melbourne went on to win the premiership the following week. In the 2000 NRL season, Parramatta finished seventh and won both their sudden death finals matches to take on Brisbane in the preliminary final. In a game that they were not expected to win, Parramatta came close but lost the match against a much stronger Brisbane side. This was their third preliminary final loss in a row.

During this period, in the wake of the resolution of the Super League War and the creation of the National Rugby League, the competition underwent a major restructure. It was announced that the new competition would comprise only 14 teams out of the 22 who had competed in the two competitions in 1997. This contraction would necessitate mergers or the culling of teams who did not meet the criteria for inclusion into the new competition. Despite meeting these criteria the Parramatta board explored mergers with both Penrith Panthers and Balmain Tigers but opted against the plan.

== 2000s ==
Parramatta, having recruited half-back Jason Taylor, finished 2001 as minor premiers and qualified for the Grand Final for the first time since 1986. Parramatta won 20 of their regular season matches with the best offensive and defensive record in the season, finishing 5 points clear of the 2nd placed Bulldogs. Parramatta set a regular-season points scoring record in the premiership by scoring 839 points in 26 matches. Playing Newcastle Knights in the Grand Final Parramatta trailed 0–24 at half-time. Despite a strong second-half performance from the Eels with two tries to both Brett Hodgson and Jamie Lyon the Eels were defeated 30–24. There are several stories as to why Parramatta were unable to win the match in the years after the game. One such story was that The Parramatta players were "Nervous and Stiff" and were dressed in Miami Vice suits at the traditional NRL Grand Final Breakfast. Ex-Newcastle player Ben Kennedy recalled the week by saying "They came into the game under a shitload of pressure but for us, it was just a good time and a heap of fun. Parra were shitting themselves and we were having a good time".

The club qualified for the finals in 2002, finishing sixth, but failed to do so in 2004, finishing ninth. In 2005, the Eels won their second minor premiership but failed to convert the position into another Grand Final appearance losing 29–0 to The North Queensland Cowboys in the preliminary final in a game that Parramatta was expected to win. It was announced soon after the disastrous 2005 finals series that coach Brian Smith had been asked to stand down after the conclusion of the 2006 season, to be replaced by Newcastle coach Michael Hagan. After a poor start to the 2006 season, Smith resigned on 15 May 2006 and was replaced by former Eels half-back Jason Taylor. Despite the team's low position on the ladder at the time, the team qualified for the finals in eighth position but were eliminated by minor premiers Melbourne Storm in the first week of the series.

In the 2007 season, Parramatta finished 5th on the ladder at the end of the regular season and once again made the preliminary final, this time against The Melbourne Storm. Parramatta lost the match 26–10. This was their 5th preliminary final loss in 9 years.

Daniel Anderson was appointed coach at the end of the 2008 NRL season.

Midway through the 2009 NRL season the troubled Parramatta Eels club replaced Denis Fitzgerald, then the longest-serving CEO in the competition's history, with Paul Osborne. Parramatta then completed a remarkable turnaround, going on to reach the grand final after sitting in 14th spot on the table after Round 18. They won 10 of their last 12 matches to make the grand final defeating minor premiers The St George Dragons, Gold Coast and Arch-Rivals Canterbury on the way to the final, which they lost to the salary cap rorting Melbourne Storm who later had the title stripped due to the cheating.

== 2010s ==
For the 2011 NRL Season, Parramatta was managed by new head coach Stephen Kearney. Round 1 saw Parramatta get off to the perfect start by beating The Auckland Warriors 24–18 at Eden Park in New Zealand. After the Round 1 victory, the rest of 2011 was a very bleak one for Parramatta, with the team finishing fourteenth on the ladder of sixteen clubs. Along the way Parramatta went on a 7-game losing streak including a 56–6 loss to South Sydney. In the final round of the season, Parramatta played against The Gold Coast, with the loser almost certainly receiving the wooden spoon. Parramatta won the match 32–12 and Gold Coast were consigned to the wooden spoon.

In 2012, things went from bad to worse at the club as Parramatta finished last for the first time since 1972. Towards the back end of the season, Kearney's contract was terminated and Brad Arthur was installed as caretaker coach. The last insult came in the final match of the season against The St George Dragons as retiring legends Luke Burt & Nathan Hindmarsh both went out as wooden spooners in their final year as players. The only thing memorable to come from the match was a last minute penalty goal kicked by Hindmarsh.

In 2013, Parramatta appointed Ricky Stuart as their new coach on a three-year deal. In the opening round there was a lot of optimism and hope for the future as Parramatta defeated Auckland Warriors 40–10 at Parramatta Stadium. This result proved to be the highlight of the season as Parramatta finished last again. Along the way Parramatta lost 10 matches in a row including heavy losses to Manly & Canterbury. Mid season, Stuart also announced that as of the end of the season, there would be a massive cull of the playing roster and twelve players were told that their services were no longer required as of next season. In May 2013 Steve Sharp was elected Chairman of the Parramatta Eels board, replacing Roy Spagnolo. On 12 September 2013, Stuart walked out on Parramatta to coach Canberra. On 16 October 2013, Brad Arthur was announced as the new head coach of Parramatta on a 3-year deal.

The 2014 season started off in great style as Parramatta won 4 out of their first 6 matches. Parramatta then went into their Easter Monday clash at Stadium Australia sitting 5th on the ladder but lost the match controversially 21–18 in front of 50,000 fans. In round 24 Parramatta were sitting 8th on the ladder and looked destined to play in the finals for the first time since 2009 and only needed to win one of their last two remaining games against sides lower than them on the table which were Canberra and Newcastle. Parramatta lost both matches and missed out on the finals series by two competition points.

The 2015 season was a year to forget for Parramatta as they finished twelfth on the table. The highlights being in Round 1 when Parramatta defeated Manly 42-12 and Semi Radradra scoring 24 tries in 18 matches.

The discovery by the NRL in 2016 of salary cap breaches, over a period of four years, resulted in it stripping the Eels of the twelve competition points the club has accrued so far in the 2016 NRL season. In addition to being fined $1 million, Parramatta also had its 2016 NRL Auckland Nines title revoked. On 19 July 2016 the Parramatta Leagues Club board was sacked by the Independent Liquor and Gaming Authority, and an administrator appointed. This effectively also removed the Eels board as the seven directors on both boards were the same people. Max Donnelly, of Ferrier Hodgson was appointed as administrator. At the time of the 12 point deduction, Parramatta were sitting 5th on the ladder but then found themselves at 14th position. Their first match played after the points deduction was against South Sydney at Parramatta Stadium, Parramatta lost the match 22–20 in a close game. 2016 would also prove to be the final year that Parramatta would play at Parramatta Stadium as it was due to be demolished at seasons end to make way for a new 30,000-seat stadium. The final home game played at Parramatta Stadium was against the St George Illawarra Dragons in front of 13,553 spectators. Parramatta went on to beat the Dragons 30–18. Parramatta's final game of 2016 saw them travel to New Zealand to play The Auckland Warriors. Parramatta won the match 40–18 with Bevan French scoring 3 tries. At the end of the season, Parramatta finished in 14th place on the ladder but if they had not been stripped of the 12 competition points they would have played in the finals.

The 2017 season saw a major turnaround for the club with Parramatta finishing fourth on the table and making the finals for the first time since 2009. Some of the highlights throughout the year were the club winning nine out of their final ten matches and defeating Brisbane twice including a 52–34 win at Suncorp Stadium and eventual premiers Melbourne. Parramatta then went on to play premiership favorites Melbourne in the first qualifying final, going into the second half Parramatta had stunned everyone by leading the match and it took Melbourne the last play of the game to hold on and win 18–16. The following week, Parramatta played against North Queensland in the sudden death elimination final. Parramatta led 10–6 at halftime but went on to lose the match 24–16 in what would be one of the biggest upsets of the season.

For the 2018 season, Parramatta were predicted by many before the season to finish in the top 8 and challenge for the premiership. Those predictions were matched in the opening round of the season as Parramatta lead Penrith 14-0 early on but after a second half capitulation lost the game 24–14. In Round 2, Parramatta were humiliated 54-0 by Manly at Brookvale Oval. Parramatta went on to lose the opening 6 games of the season before eventually winning their first game of the season defeating Manly 44–10 in Round 7. In Round 8, Parramatta defeated Wests 24–22 to make it back to back victories for the club. The Eels then went on to lose the next 5 games in a row before eventually winning their third game of the season defeating North Queensland 20–14 in Darwin in which Jarryd Hayne returned from injury scoring two tries. The following weeks were filled with disappointment as the club came close to pulling off upset wins against top of the table St George only for the club to concede two tries in 5 minutes to lose 20-18 and South Sydney after leading 20-6 late into the game only for The Rabbitohs to score late tries and win 26–20. In Round 18, Parramatta lost 18–16 to Newcastle with The Eels being denied a last minute try after it was ruled winger Bevan French had put his foot over the sideline. The following week, Parramatta defeated arch rivals Canterbury 14–8 in what the media dubbed the "Spoon Bowl". There were hopes that Parramatta could avoid the wooden spoon as going into the second last game of the season the club sat above North Queensland on the table due to for and against. In what was the retiring Jonathan Thurston's final home game, both clubs needed a win to avoid the wooden spoon. North Queensland won the match 44–6. In the final game of the season, Parramatta were defeated 44-10 by Eastern Suburbs ensuring that the club finished last and claimed their 14th wooden spoon and The Roosters claiming the minor premiership. Before the match, Easts needed to defeat Parramatta by 27 points to overtake Melbourne and finish first on the table.

Before the start of the 2019 NRL season, Parramatta were predicted by many to finish towards the bottom of the table or claim another wooden spoon. The club started off the year with back to back victories over Penrith and arch rivals Canterbury-Bankstown. In Round 6 of the 2019 NRL season, Parramatta played their first game at the new Western Sydney Stadium against the Wests Tigers and ran out 51-6 winners in front of a sold-out crowd.

In Round 9 against Melbourne, Parramatta suffered one of their worst ever defeats losing 64–10 at Suncorp Stadium. In the aftermath of the defeat, coach Brad Arthur and the players were placed under intense scrutiny but just a week after the loss, Arthur was given a two-year contract extension by the Parramatta board. The club would then go on to lose against North Queensland and last placed Penrith in the coming weeks.

Between Round 12 and Round 22 of the 2019 season, Parramatta would go on to win 8 of their 10 games. In Round 22 against the Gold Coast Titans, Parramatta qualified for the 2019 finals series with a 36–12 victory at Cbus Super Stadium.

At the end of the 2019 regular season, Parramatta finished 5th on the table and qualified for the finals. In the elimination final against Brisbane, Parramatta won the match 58–0 at the new Western Sydney Stadium. The victory was the biggest finals win in history, eclipsing Newtown's 55–7 win over St George in 1944. The match was also Parramatta's biggest win over Brisbane and Brisbane's worst ever loss since entering the competition in 1988. The following week against Melbourne in the elimination semi final, Parramatta were defeated 32–0 at AAMI Park which ended their season. The loss against Melbourne was also the sixth time Parramatta had been defeated by Melbourne in a finals game since 1999.

== 2020s ==
At the start of the 2020 NRL season, Parramatta won their first five matches in a row which put them at the top of the table. It was the club's best start to a season since 1989. At the end of the 2020 regular season, Parramatta finished in third place on the table and secured a top four spot. It was the club's highest finish on the table since 2005. In the qualifying final, Parramatta lead Melbourne 12-0 early on before losing the match 36–24 at Suncorp Stadium. The following week in the elimination final, Parramatta played against South Sydney for the first time in a finals game since 1965. Parramatta led the match 18-8 before a second hald capitulation saw them lose 38-24 ending their season.

Parramatta started the 2021 NRL season with four consecutive victories before losing to St. George Illawarra in round 5. They then won the next five matches in a row to sit second on the competition ladder after ten rounds. By round 18, the club sat entrenched within the top four of the competition with a six-point gap ahead of the fifth and sixth placed Sydney Roosters and Manly-Warringah. The club then suffered an end of season slump losing to Canberra, an understrength Sydney Roosters side 28-0 and then two heavy defeats against South Sydney and Manly. Parramatta recovered to defeat North Queensland and then pulled off one of the upsets in 2021, defeating Melbourne 22-10 which ended their 19-game winning streak. Parramatta would end the 2021 regular season in sixth place. In week one against Newcastle in the elimination final, Parramatta won a close match 28–20. The following week, Parramatta lost 8–6 in the lowest scoring match of the year against Penrith in the second week of the finals which ended their season.

Parramatta started the 2022 NRL season winning four of their opening five matches. Throughout the 2022 regular season, Parramatta struggled with consistency. Although they defeated Penrith and Melbourne twice, the club only managed to win more than three games consecutively on two separate occasions and lost to eventual wooden spooners the Wests Tigers in round 6 of the competition. In round 14, Parramatta suffered an embarrassing 34–4 loss against arch-rivals Canterbury who were sitting bottom of the table. In round 22, Parramatta were defeated 26-0 by South Sydney which saw them fall to seventh on the table. However, Parramatta would win their final three games in convincing fashion to finish fourth. In week one of the finals, Parramatta were defeated 27-8 by Penrith before bouncing back the following week against Canberra in the elimination final 40–4 to reach their first preliminary final since 2009. In the preliminary final, Parramatta pulled off one of the biggest upsets in the NRL era defeating North Queensland 24–20 in Townsville to reach the Grand Final. In the 2022 NRL Grand Final against Penrith, Parramatta trailed 18–0 at half-time before going on to lose 28–12.

Parramatta started the 2023 NRL season with three straight losses, all of which were by four points. In round 1, the club lost in golden point extra-time to Melbourne, followed by a four-point loss to Cronulla and then another defeat against Manly at Brookvale Oval. In round 4, Parramatta defeated back to back premiers Penrith 17–16 in golden point extra-time with Mitchell Moses kicking the winning field goal. Between rounds 12–17, Parramatta recorded five straight victories including an upset victory over South Sydney in round 12. In round 17, the club recorded their highest ever first half score in a game as they led the Dolphins 42–4 at half-time before going on to win 48–20. The victory elevated the club up to fifth place on the table. In round 19, Parramatta suffered their biggest loss of the year losing 46–10 against the New Zealand Warriors with a number of key players missing due to injury and State of Origin selection. All of Parramatta's previous losses in the season were by ten points or less. Following their loss to New Zealand, the club suffered a form slump only winning two of their next six matches which included heavy losses to Melbourne and Brisbane. Parramatta's season was officially ended in round 25 when they lost against the Sydney Roosters 34–12 which meant the club could not make the finals. The following week, Parramatta pulled off one of the biggest upsets in the 2023 season defeating Penrith 32–18. Parramatta would miss out on the top 8 by two points with an eventual finish of 10th place.

Parramatta started the 2024 NRL season with a 26–8 victory over arch-rivals Canterbury. Following the club's round 3 victory over Manly, Parramatta were dealt a huge blow with halfback Mitchell Moses suffering a foot injury which ruled him on indefinitely. In round 4, the club would succumb to an embarrassing defeat against the Wests Tigers who had finished the previous two seasons with the Wooden Spoon. Captain Clint Gutherson had a penalty goal attempt after the full-time siren to win the game which he missed with Wests winning 17–16. In round 7, Parramatta were beaten 44–16 by the Dolphins at TIO Stadium in Darwin. The Dolphins had seven starting players ruled out of the game with injury and head coach Wayne Bennett was also missing due to illness. The score was in favour of Parramatta 8–4 at half-time, however in the second half the club would capitulate conceding eight tries in under 25 minutes. Following the club's 48-16 loss against Melbourne at Magic Round, head coach Brad Arthur was terminated by Parramatta ending his ten-year tenure in charge. Trent Barrett was named as the club's interim head coach for the rest of the 2024 season. On the same day it was reported that Parramatta had been in talks with Wayne Bennett to become the new head coach whilst Arthur was still in charge but Bennett opted to sign a three-year deal with South Sydney. In round 12 of the 2024 NRL season, Parramatta suffered one of their most embarrassing losses in recent times losing 42–26 against South Sydney who were bottom of the table and only had one win to their name prior to the match. Souths also had eight first team players out and had lost their previous six games in a row. On 8 July 2024, the club announced that Jason Ryles would be appointed as the new head coach of the side on a four-year deal starting in 2025. The club would manage to avoid the wooden spoon in the final game of the regular season after defeating the Wests Tigers 60–26 in the "Spoon Bowl" game. Due to other results going their way, Parramatta would finish 15th on the table.

In round 1 of the 2025 NRL season, Parramatta's new era under head coach Jason Ryles got off the worst possible start with the club losing against Melbourne 56–18.
