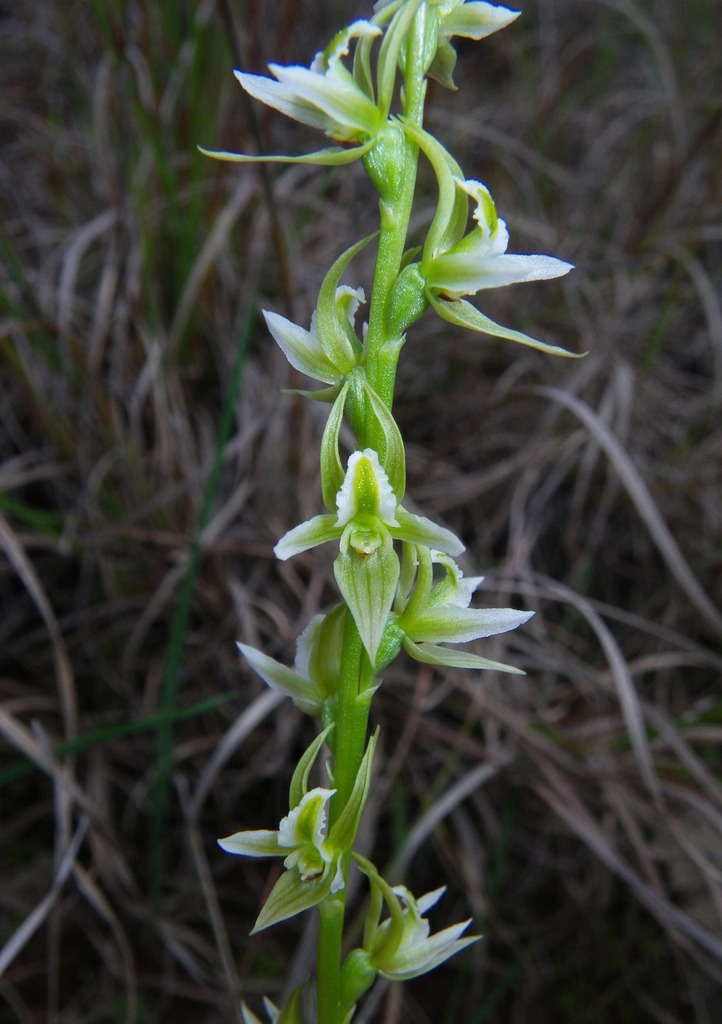
- Near Werris Creek

Scientific classification
- Kingdom: Plantae
- Clade: Tracheophytes
- Clade: Angiosperms
- Clade: Monocots
- Order: Asparagales
- Family: Orchidaceae
- Subfamily: Orchidoideae
- Tribe: Diurideae
- Genus: Prasophyllum
- Species: P. albovirens

Binomial name
- Prasophyllum albovirens D.L.Jones & L.M.Copel.

= Prasophyllum albovirens =

Species of orchid

Prasophyllum albovirens is a species of orchid endemic to New South Wales. It has a single tubular, dark green leaf and ten to twenty, sweetly-scented, pale green flowers with faint darker stripes, the labellum green with white edges. It grows in grassy woodland in scattered places on the Northern Tablelands.

== Description ==
Prasophyllum albovirens is a terrestrial, perennial, deciduous, herb with an underground tuber and a single dark green, tube-shaped leaf, 120–250 mm (4.7–9.8 in) long and 4–6 mm (0.16–0.24 in) wide with a red to purple base. Between ten and twenty pale green flowers with faint darker stripes, 16–20 mm (0.63–0.79 in) long and 9–12 mm (0.35–0.47 in) wide are arranged along 80–150 mm (3.1–5.9 in) of a flowering spike that reaches a height of 150–300 mm (5.9–11.8 in). As with others in the genus, the labellum is above the column rather than below it. The dorsal sepal is egg-shaped to lance-shaped, 9–11 mm (0.35–0.43 in) long and about 4 mm (0.16 in) wide and has three fine darker veins. The lateral sepals are linear to lance-shaped, 10–12 mm (0.39–0.47 in) long and about 2 mm (0.079 in) wide. The petals are linear and spread widely apart, 8–9 mm (0.31–0.35 in) long and about 2 m (6 ft 7 in) wide with a darker green central line. The labellum is white, egg-shaped in outline, 8.5–9.5 mm (0.33–0.37 in) long and about 3.5–4.0 mm (0.14–0.16 in) wide with wavy edges. There is thin but broad green to yellowish-green callus with a dark green base in the centre of the labellum, extending to its tip. Flowering occurs in September and October.

== Taxonomy and naming ==
Prasophyllum albovirens was first formally described in 2018 by David Jones and Lachlan Copeland in Australian Orchid Review from a specimen collected by Copeland near Currabubula in 2010. The specific epithet (albovirens) means "white-green", referring to the colour of the flowers.

== Distribution and habitat ==
This leek orchid grows in grassy white box (Eucalyptus albens) or Callitris woodland in scattered populations on the Northern Tablelands of New South Wales, including near Currabubula, the Narrabri and Inverell districts, and Mount Kaputar National Park, at altitudes of 350 to 600 m (1,150 to 1,970 ft).
