= Eric Bennett (rugby league) =

Australian rugby league footballer

Personal information
- Full name: Eric Kitchener Bennett
- Born: 21 August 1915 Currabubula, New South Wales, Australia
- Died: 9 December 1998 (aged 83)

Playing information
- Position: Five-eighth, Centre
Club
Years	Team	Pld	T	G	FG	P
1941–49	Western Suburbs	101	38	1	0	116
Representative
Years	Team	Pld	T	G	FG	P
1942–45	NSW City	2	0	0	0	0
1945	New South Wales	2	0	0	0	0

Eric Bennett is an Australian former rugby league footballer who played in the 1940s. Hailing from The Central West region of New South Wales, he played in the New South Wales Rugby Football League premiership for Western Suburbs at centre and five-eighth.

Bennett played over 100 games for Western Suburbs from 1941 to 1949, He captained Wests and played at centre in their 1948 NSWRFL season's premiership final victory over Balmain. Australian Rugby League Hall of Famer Keith Holman has credited Bennett, who helped him sign with Wests, as being a great influence on his career.
