= Pat Leal =

Australian rugby league footballer (1929–2006)

Personal information
- Full name: Patrick Alexander Leal
- Born: 4 April 1929
- Died: 19 November 2006 (aged 77)

Playing information
- Position: Wing
Club
Years	Team	Pld	T	G	FG	P
1946–53	Western Suburbs	44	25	0	0	75

Patrick Alexander Leal (4 April 1929 – 19 November 2006) was an Australian rugby league footballer.

== Rugby league career ==
Leal was primarily a winger in his first–grade career for Western Suburbs, where he debuted in 1946. He represented a "Rest of NSW" side against New South Wales in a 1947 testimonial match held in honour of Jersey Flegg. In 1948, Leal contributed nine tries in their premiership–winning season, but had the misfortune of missing the grand final, having slipped on a step during training and pulled a leg muscle. He left Western Suburbs in 1949 to coach Muswellbrook. On his return to the Magpies in the early 1950s, Leal was at times utilised as a second rower, while in a later stint with Brisbane club Western Suburbs he played as a lock.
