= Lindsay Rodda =

Australian rugby league footballer

Personal information
- Full name: Lindsay Herbert Rodda
- Born: 28 June 1923
- Died: 28 July 2001 (aged 78)

Playing information
- Position: Centre
Club
Years	Team	Pld	T	G	FG	P
1946–50	Western Suburbs	33	5	0	0	15
- Source: As of 3 May 2019

Lindsay Rodda was an Australian rugby league footballer who played in the 1940s and 1950s. He played for Western Suburbs in the New South Wales Rugby League (NSWRL) competition.

== Playing career ==
Rodda made his first grade debut for Western Suburbs in 1946. That season, the club ran second last on the table finishing above Souths who went the entire season without winning a game. The following year, Wests appointed Frank Burge as head coach. The club would go on to finish 4th and make the finals. Rodda played in the semi-final defeat against Balmain which Wests lost 27–16.

The following season, Rodda was part of the Western Suburbs side which won the minor premiership and reached the 1948 NSWRL grand final against Balmain. Rodda played at centre in the match as Balmain went into halftime holding a 5–3 lead. In the second half, a long range try scored by Wests player Kevin Hansen gave Western Suburbs an 8–5 lead which they held onto until the end of the match winning their third premiership in front of 29,122 fans at the Sydney Sports Ground.

Rodda missed the entire 1949 season but returned to the side in 1950. Rodda retired at the end of the 1950 season and did not play in the club's grand final defeat against South Sydney.
