= Col Hudson =

Australian rugby league footballer

Personal information
- Full name: Colin John Hudson
- Born: 18 February 1927
- Died: 14 June 2006 (aged 79)

Playing information
- Position: Wing, Centre
Club
Years	Team	Pld	T	G	FG	P
1947–49	Western Suburbs	13	5	0	0	15
1951	St. George	3	1	0	0	3
	Total	16	6	0	0	18
- Source: As of 4 May 2019

Col Hudson was an Australian rugby league footballer who played in the 1940s and 1950s. He played for Western Suburbs and St George in the New South Wales Rugby League (NSWRL) competition.

== Playing career ==
Hudson made his first grade debut for Western Suburbs in 1947. The following season, Hudson was part of the Western Suburbs side which won the minor premiership and reached the 1948 NSWRL grand final against Balmain. Hudson played on the wing in the match as Balmain went into halftime holding a 5-3 lead. In the second half, a long range try scored by Wests player Kevin Hansen gave Western Suburbs a 8-5 lead which they held onto until the end of the match winning their third premiership in front of 29,122 fans at the Sydney Sports Ground.

Hudson departed Western Suburbs following the conclusion of the 1949 season. Due to residency rules at the time, Hudson sat out the 1950 season before signing with St George in 1951. Hudson only managed 3 appearances for St George in 1951 and retired at the conclusion of the season.
