= List of current NRL coaches =

This list includes the appointment dates and performance records of the 17 current National Rugby League head coaches.

Wayne Bennett, the head coach of the South Sydney Rabbitohs, has coached in the NRL since 1987, making him the longest-serving coach in the league.

Appointments that do not take immediate effect begin on 1 November.

== Coaches ==
Key
Prem	Premiership wins
W	Wins
L	Losses
D	Draws
GC	Games coached
Win%	Winning percentage
†	Caretaker coach

Statistics are correct to the end of the 2025 NRL season

Team	Name	Start date (Note: Commencement date of current term at the team.)	Time as coach	Prem	W	L	D	GC	Win%	Prem	W	L	D	GC	Win%	Source
Team	Name	Start date	Time as coach	Current (Note: Coaching statistics from the current term with the team; coaching statistics from previous term with the team are not included.)						Career (Note: Coaching statistics for career in the NRL, records in other leagues are not included.)						Source
Brisbane	Michael Maguire	1 October 2024	1 year, 240 days	1	18	9	0	27	66.7%	2	132	128	0	260	50.8%	
Canberra	Ricky Stuart	1 November 2013	12 years, 209 days	0	158	138	1	297	53.2%	1	279	261	2	542	51.5%	
Canterbury-Bankstown	Cameron Ciraldo	1 November 2022	3 years, 209 days	0	37	38	0	75	49.3%	0	41	41	0	82	50.0%	
Cronulla-Sutherland	Craig Fitzgibbon	1 November 2021	4 years, 209 days	0	66	39	0	105	62.9%	0	66	39	0	105	62.9%	
Gold Coast	Josh Hannay	1 November 2025	209 days	0	2	9	0	11	18.18%	0	13	28	0	41	31.7%	
Manly-Warringah	Kieran Foran	27 March 2026	63 days	0	7	1	0	8	87.5%	0	7	1	0	8	87.5%	
Melbourne	Craig Bellamy	18 September 2002	23 years, 253 days	3	421	181	2	604	69.7%	3	422	182	2	606	69.6%	
New Zealand	Andrew Webster	1 November 2022	3 years, 209 days	0	40	35	1	76	52.6%	0	40	38	1	79	50.6%	
Newcastle	Justin Holbrook	1 November 2025	209 days	0	0	0	0	0	–	0	31	51	0	82	37.8%	
North Queensland	Todd Payten	1 November 2020	5 years, 209 days	0	62	61	1	124	50.0%	0	68	69	1	138	49.3%	
Parramatta	Jason Ryles	1 November 2024	1 year, 209 days	0	10	14	0	24	42.0	0	10	14	0	24	42.0%	
Penrith	Ivan Cleary	1 November 2018	7 years, 209 days	4	134	47	2	183	73.2%	4	273	200	5	478	57.1%	
Dolphins	Kristian Woolf	1 November 2024	1 year, 209 days	0	13	11	0	24	54.2%	0	14	13	0	27	51.2%	
South Sydney	Wayne Bennett	1 November 2024	1 year, 209 days	0	9	15	0	24	37.5%	7	584	362	14	960	62.2%	
St. George Illawarra	Shane Flanagan	1 November 2023	2 years, 209 days	0	19	29	0	48	39.6%	1	121	110	2	233	51.9%	
Sydney Roosters	Trent Robinson	1 November 2012	13 years, 209 days	3	210	126	0	336	62.5%	3	210	126	0	336	62.5%	
Wests Tigers	Benji Marshall	1 November 2023	2 years, 209 days	0	15	33	0	48	31.3%	0	15	33	0	48	31.3%	

== See also ==
- List of current NRL Women's coaches
- List of NSWRL/ARL/SL/NRL premiership captains and coaches
