= Warrigundi railway station =

Former railway station in New South Wales, Australia

Warrigundi

General information
- Location: Werris Creek Road, Currabubula; New South Wales; Australia
- Coordinates: 31°17′28″S 150°40′30″E
- Operator: Public Transport Commission
- Line: Main North
- Distance: 418.040 km (259.758 mi) from Central
- Platforms: 1 (1 side)
- Tracks: 1

Construction
- Structure type: Ground

Other information
- Status: Demolished

History
- Opened: 1886 (140 years ago)
- Closed: 28 February 1975 (51 years ago)
- Former names: Terrible Vale (1886–1913)

Services
Preceding station	Former services	Following station
Currabubula towards Wallangarra	Main Northern Line	Werris Creek towards Sydney
Location

Warrigundi railway station was a regional railway station located on the Main North line, serving the New England village of Currabubula. It was located about 17 km north of Werris Creek.

== History ==
Warrigundi station was opened in 1886 as Terrible Vale. It was renamed Warrigundi on 14 February 1913. The station closed to passengers on 28 February 1975, and was subsequently demolished.
