= Don Milton =

Australian rugby league footballer (1923–1974)

Personal information
- Full name: Donald Albert Milton
- Born: 22 December 1923 Bankstown, New South Wales, Australia
- Died: 29 September 1974 (aged 50) Cronulla, New South Wales, Australia

Playing information
- Position: Second-row
Club
Years	Team	Pld	T	G	FG	P
1944–50	Western Suburbs	77	23	0	0	69

Donald Albert Milton (1923–1974) was an Australian rugby league footballer who played in the 1940s and 1950s.

== Background ==
Milton was born in Bankstown, New South Wales on 22 December 1923.

== Playing career ==
Milton joined Western Suburbs during his military service in 1944. He played seven seasons with Wests between 1944 and 1950, which included an appearance playing second-row in the victorious Western Suburbs team that won the 1948 Grand Final. Milton also played in the 1950 Grand Final and retired after the game.

== Death ==
Milton died at Cronulla, New South Wales on 29 September 1974, aged 51.
