= William Brown (rugby league) =

Australian rugby league footballer (1916–1982)

Personal information
- Full name: William Brown
- Born: 15 June 1916 Arncliffe, New South Wales, Australia
- Died: 12 July 1982 (aged 66)

Playing information
- Position: Hooker, Second-row
Club
Years	Team	Pld	T	G	FG	P
1938–41	Balmain	6	0	0	0	0
1942–49	Western Suburbs	38	1	0	0	3
	Total	44	1	0	0	3
- Source: As of 3 May 2019

William Thomas Brown (15 June 1916 – 12 July 1982) was an Australian rugby league footballer who played in the 1930s and 1940s. He played for Western Suburbs and Balmain in the New South Wales Rugby League (NSWRL) competition.

== Playing career ==
A Balmain junior, Brown made his first grade debut for the club in Round 9 1938 against St George at Earl Park, Arncliffe. The following year in 1939, Brown only made 1 appearance and missed out on playing in the club's premiership victory over South Sydney.

In 1941, Brown made 4 appearances as Balmain won the minor premiership but fell short of another grand final. Brown then joined Western Suburbs in 1942. Brown's first few seasons at Wests were difficult with the club finishing last in 1942 and towards the bottom in the coming years. In 1947, Wests announced Frank Burge as their new head coach. Burge took the club to the finals in 1947 and Brown played in the semi-final defeat against his old club Balmain.

The following season, Brown was part of the Western Suburbs side which won the minor premiership and reached the 1948 NSWRL grand final against Balmain. Brown played at hooker in the match as Balmain went into halftime holding a 5–3 lead. In the second half, a long range try scored by Wests player Kevin Hansen gave Western Suburbs an 8–5 lead which they held onto until the end of the match winning their third premiership in front of 29,122 fans at the Sydney Sports Ground. Brown retired the following season in 1949.

== Death ==
Brown died on 12 July 1982, at the age of 66.
