= Neville Hogan (rugby league) =

Australian rugby league footballer

Personal information
- Full name: Neville Vincent Hogan
- Born: 22 March 1923 Burwood, New South Wales, Australia
- Died: 18 November 1990 (aged 67)

Playing information
- Position: Halfback
Club
Years	Team	Pld	T	G	FG	P
1944–48	Western Suburbs	53	7	0	0	21
Representative
Years	Team	Pld	T	G	FG	P
1947	New South Wales	1	0	0	0	0
- Source: As of 3 May 2019

Neville Hogan also known as "Noel Hogan" was an Australian rugby league footballer who played in the 1940s. He played for Western Suburbs in the New South Wales Rugby League (NSWRL) competition.

== Playing career ==
Hogan made his first grade debut for Western Suburbs in 1946. That season, the club ran second last on the table. The following year, Wests appointed Frank Burge as head coach. The club would go on to finish 4th and make the finals. Hogan played in the semi-final defeat against Balmain. Hogan was also selected to play for New South Wales and featured in one interstate game against Queensland.

The following season, Hogan was part of the Western Suburbs side which won the minor premiership and reached the 1948 NSWRL grand final against Balmain. Hogan played at halfback in the match as Balmain went into halftime holding a 5-3 lead. In the second half, a long range try scored by Wests player Kevin Hansen gave Western Suburbs an 8-5 lead which they held onto until the end of the match winning their third premiership in front of 29,122 fans at the Sydney Sports Ground.

Hogan departed the club following the grand final victory. Hogan's departure gave way to Western Suburbs signing a young Keith Holman who would go on to become one of the club's greatest ever players.
