= William Sneddon =

Australian rugby league footballer (1926–2018)

Personal information
- Full name: William Sneddon
- Born: 10 August 1926 Cessnock, New South Wales, Australia
- Died: 15 February 2018 (aged 91) Wauchope, New South Wales, Australia

Playing information
- Position: Five-eighth, Halfback
Club
Years	Team	Pld	T	G	FG	P
1948–49	Balmain	21	2	0	0	6
1950	South Sydney	2	0	0	0	0
	Total	23	2	0	0	6
- Source: As of 9 May 2019

Bill Sneddon (1926-2018) also known as "Wally Sneddon" was an Australian rugby league footballer who played in the 1940s and 1950s. He played for Balmain and South Sydney in the New South Wales Rugby League (NSWRL) competition.

== Background ==
Sneddon played rugby league for Grafton in the NSW Country competition before being spotted by Balmain scouts and was signed by the club.

== Playing career ==
Sneddon made his first grade debut for Balmain in 1948. Balmain would go on to reach the 1948 NSWRL grand final against Western Suburbs. Sneddon played at five-eighth as Balmain took a 5-3 lead into half time. In the second half, Western Suburbs scored a try through Kevin Hansen to make the score 8-5. Balmain were unable to score any further points and lost the grand final in front of 30,000 fans at the Sydney Sports Ground. The following year, Balmain reached the preliminary final against St George but lost the match to the eventual premiers 18-7. This was Sneddon's last game for Balmain and he departed to join South Sydney.

Sneddon only made 2 appearances for South Sydney and missed out on playing in the club's grand final victory over Western Suburbs. Sneddon did not return to the Souths team in 1951 after he suffered a serious knee injury and had to retire prematurely. Sneddon later went on to become a referee.
