= Jack Lackey =

Australian rugby league footballer

John Lackey
Personal information
- Full name: John Maurice Lackey
- Born: 1924 Ashfield, New South Wales, Australia
- Died: 2017 (aged 92–93) Perth, WA, Australia

Playing information
- Position: Wing, Centre, Hooker
Club
Years	Team	Pld	T	G	FG	P
1947–50	Western Suburbs	39	10	0	0	30
- Source: As of 3 May 2019

John Lackey (1924-2017) nicknamed "Jack" was an Australian professional rugby league footballer who played in the 1940s and 1950s. He played for Western Suburbs in the New South Wales Rugby League (NSWRL) competition.

== Background ==
Lackey was a Western Suburbs junior and played for the Presidents Cup team in 1943. Lackey was later promoted to the first team in 1947.

== Playing career ==
Lackey made his first grade debut for Western Suburbs in 1947. The club would go on the reach the finals by finishing fourth but were eliminated by Balmain. The following season, Lackey was part of the Western Suburbs side which won the minor premiership and reached the 1948 NSWRL grand final against Balmain. Lackey played on the wing in the match as Balmain went into halftime holding a 5-3 lead. In the second half, a long range try scored by Wests player Kevin Hansen gave Western Suburbs a 8-5 lead which they held onto until the end of the match winning their third premiership.

In 1950, Lackey finished as joint top try scorer for the club as they reached the 1950 NSWRL grand final against South Sydney. Lackey played on the wing as Wests lost the grand final 21-15. Lackey then departed the club and joined country side Peak Hill in 1951. Lackey captain-coached Peak Hill to the 1951 premiership and held the role of captain-coach until the end of 1954.
