= Tom Bourke =

Australian rugby league footballer, coach and administrator

Personal information
- Full name: Thomas Matthew Bourke
- Born: 4 April 1918 Woy Woy, New South Wales, Australia
- Died: 29 December 2001 (aged 83) Five Dock, New South Wales, Australia

Playing information
- Position: Centre, Wing
Club
| Years | Team | Pld | T | G | FG | P |
|---|---|---|---|---|---|---|
| 1939–48 | Balmain | 147 | 47 | 76 | 0 | 293 |
| 1949–?? | Griffith |
| | Total | 147 | 47 | 76 | 0 | 293 |
Representative
| Years | Team | Pld | T | G | FG | P |
| 1945 | New South Wales | 1 | 0 | 0 | 0 | 0 |
| 1943–45 | NSW City | 3 | 0 | 5 | 0 | 10 |

Tom Bourke (4 April 1918 – 29 December 2001) was an Australian rugby league footballer who played in the 1930s and 1940s. A New South Wales representative centre, he played his club football in Sydney for Balmain who he captained, and with whom he won several premierships. During his career, he was described as, "one of the heaviest tacklers playing rugby league."

== Playing career ==
Bourke progressed through Balmain's junior ranks before debuting in first grade in the 1939 NSWRFL season. Later that year, he played in his first grand final, scoring two tries in his team's victory over South Sydney.

At the end of the 1944 NSWRFL season, Patton captained Balmain from the wing in the grand final against Newtown, winning 12–8. Succeeding Arthur Patton as Balmain captain for the 1945 NSWRFL season, Patton again lead them to the grand final which was narrowly lost to Eastern Suburbs. He led Balmain to successive premierships in 1946 (kicking two goals) and 1947 (playing at lock). He captained Balmain to the 1948 NSWRFL season's grand final, hoping to make it three premierships in a row to equal Souths' record of eleven premierships. He scored his team's lone try and goal, but Balmain were beaten by Wests.

In 1949, Bourke left Sydney and took on a position of captain-coach in Griffith, New South Wales.

Balmain Premiers 1939 - Bourke 1st row 3rd from left

== Post-playing ==
After his retirement from the playing field, Bourke continued his association with the Balmain club through coaching and as a selector. He died in 2001, aged 83.

In 2003, Bourke was named in the Balmain Tigers team of the century. and was thus one of the inaugural inductees of the Balmain Tigers Hall of Fame in 2005.
