= Colin Schomberg =

Australian rugby league footballer

Personal information
- Full name: Colin Schomberg

Playing information
- Position: Fullback
Club
Years	Team	Pld	T	G	FG	P
1947–51	Parramatta	72	2	127	2	264

Colin Schomberg was an Australian professional rugby league footballer who played in the 1940s and 1950s. He played for Parramatta as a fullback.

== Playing career ==
Schomberg began his rugby league career with Parramatta in 1947, the year that they were admitted into the competition. Schomberg played in Parramatta's first ever game on April 12, 1947, against Newtown at Cumberland Oval which Parramatta lost 34–12. Parramatta went on to lose the next 6 games until Round 7 when they defeated Western Suburbs 13–8 to win their first ever match. Schomberg kicked two field goals in the game. In 1986, Schomberg spoke about being a part of Parramatta's first ever victory saying “Naturally I remember the field goals and the jubilation, We couldn’t get off the ground because the crowd mobbed us. They were cheering and chairing us. It was a wonderful experience".

Parramatta ended up finishing last in their inaugural year and claimed its first wooden spoon. Schomberg finished as top point scorer for the club in 1948 and 1949 as the newly admitted side struggled on the field finishing around the bottom of the table in the following 4 seasons. Schomberg retired at the end of 1951.
