= Frank Cottle =

Australian rugby league footballer

Personal information
- Full name: Frank Alan Cottle
- Born: 21 December 1920 Melbourne, Victoria, Australia
- Died: 17 February 1992 (aged 71) Forster, New South Wales, Australia

Playing information
- Position: Centre
Club
Years	Team	Pld	T	G	FG	P
1940–51	North Sydney	75	12	0	0	36
Representative
Years	Team	Pld	T	G	FG	P
1947	New South Wales	3	0	0	0	0
1947–48	NSW City	2	1	0	0	3
- Source: Whiticker/Hudson

Frank Alan Cottle (21 December 1920 – 17 February 1992) was an Australian rugby league player who played in the 1940s and 1950s.

== Playing career ==
A Norths junior from the Cremorne club, Cottle played nine seasons with North Sydney between 1940 and 1951.

War service saw Cottle miss the 1943, 1944 and 1945 seasons. He later went on to captain North Sydney and was a popular clubman during his time at the club.

Cottle was also selected to play for New South Wales on three occasions during 1947, and also represented City Firsts between 1947 and 1948.

Cottle died on 17 February 1992, aged 71.
