= Oriel Kennerson =

Australian rugby league footballer (1920–1979)

Personal information
- Full name: Oriel William Kennerson
- Born: 23 December 1920 Bathurst, New South Wales, Australia
- Died: 25 January 1979 (aged 58)

Playing information
- Position: Fullback
Club
Years	Team	Pld	T	G	FG	P
1947–49	Newtown Jets	46	7	103	0	227

Oriel William Kennerson (23 December 1920 – 25 January 1979) was an Australian rugby league footballer.

Born in Bathurst, New South Wales, Kennerson was a rugby union player during his schoolboy years at Newington College, where he learnt the game from former dual–code international Patrick McCue. He continued with rugby union when he returned to Bathurst and did not switch to rugby league until 1941.

Kennerson played his early rugby league for Bathurst and was at his best at fullback, although he could also play as a centre and five–eighth. His breakthrough performance came representing Western Districts against the touring British at Orange in 1946, after which he received offers to play in England. He was also approached by Ray Stehr to play for Eastern Suburbs, but decided on Newtown, which he joined for the 1947 season. Despite a poor start that saw him dropped to the reserves, Kennerson soon established himself as the Newtown fullback.

A butcher by trade, Kennerson managed his father's butchers shop in the town of Bathurst.
