= Mitchell Wallace =

Australian rugby league footballer

Personal information
- Full name: Mitchell Wallace
- Born: 10 June 1922; Balmain, New South Wales, Australia
- Died: 29 August 2016 (aged 94)

Playing information
- Position: Wing
Club
Years	Team	Pld	T	G	FG	P
1945–48	Balmain	13	5	0	0	15
1949–52	Parramatta	66	57	0	0	171
	Total	79	62	0	0	186

Mitchell Wallace was an Australian professional rugby league footballer who played in the 1940s and 1950s. He played for Balmain Tigers and Parramatta as a winger.

== Playing career ==
Wallace played his junior rugby league with the Balmain Shamrocks and made his first grade debut for Balmain against Newtown at the Sydney Cricket Ground in 1945. In 1948, Wallace played on the wing for Balmain in the grand final defeat against Western Suburbs. In 1949, Wallace joined newly admitted club Parramatta. Despite the side languishing near the bottom of the ladder each year, Wallace finished as the top try scorer at the club in each of the four seasons he played there with most of his try scoring records standing until the club's golden era in the 1980s.
