= Currabubula =

- Town
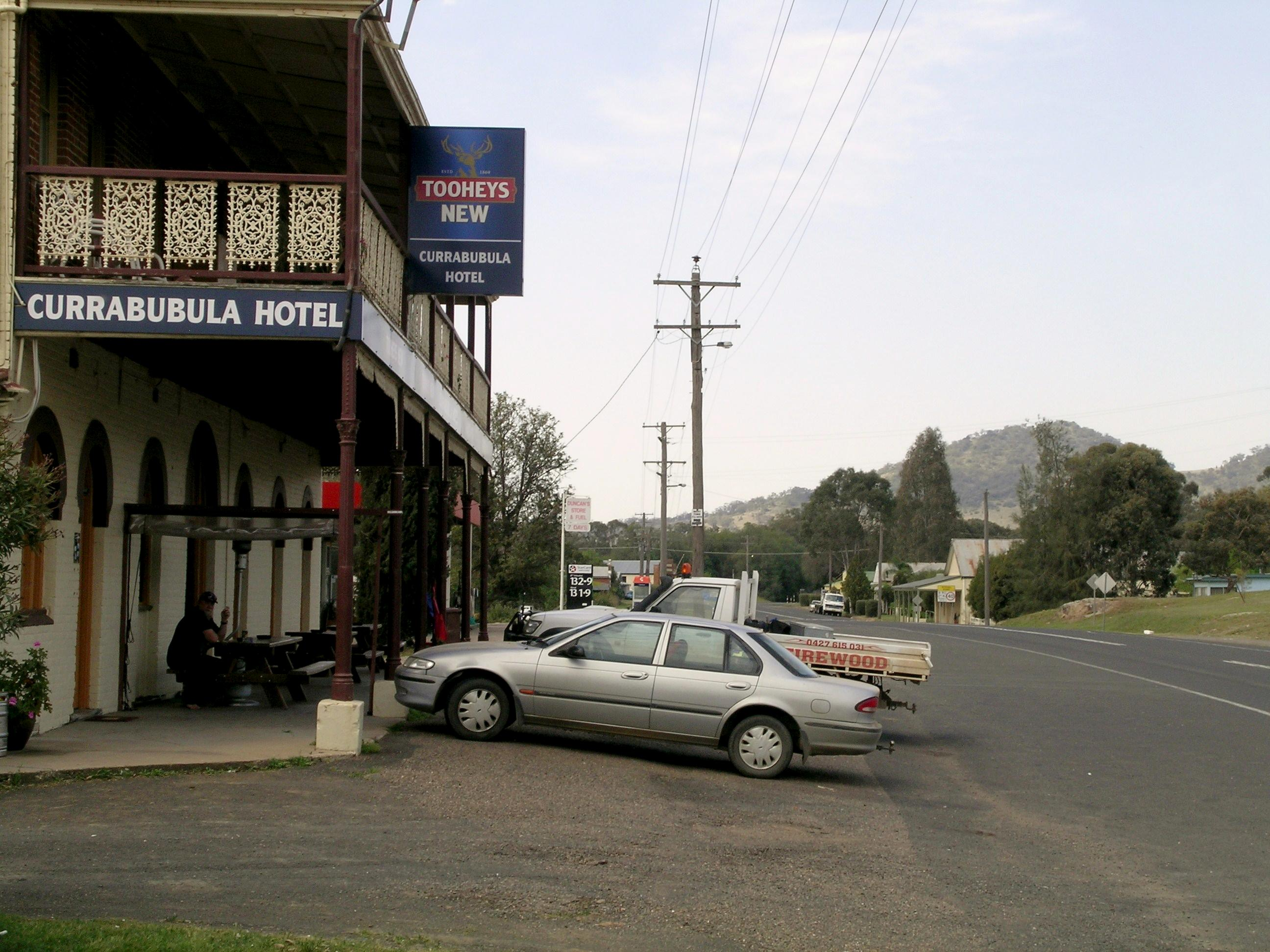
- The main street.

- Coordinates: 31°16′S 150°44′E
- Country: Australia
- State: New South Wales
- LGA: Liverpool Plains Shire
- Established: c.1855

Government
  - State electorate: Tamworth
  - Federal division: New England
- Elevation: 433 m (1,421 ft)

Population
  - Total: 332 (2016 census)
- Postcode: 2342
- County: Buckland

Currabubula is a village on the North West Slopes of the New England region of New South Wales, Australia. It is located on the Werris Creek Road 30 kilometres south-west of Tamworth and 15 km north-east of Werris Creek. Currabubula is in the Liverpool Plains Shire local government area. As of 2016, it had a local population of 332.

== History ==
The Indigenous Kamilaroi people lived in the area for many thousands of years. Originally known as "Carrobobella" which comes from the Kamilaroi language, the name was then changed with the arrival of white settlers. Before 1848 there was an 'accommodation house' at Currabubula and by 1854 (or even possibly earlier) there was an inn located at Carabobbela. The village was laid out before 1860 and in 1862 Currabubula was shown on the county map. A railway station on the Main North railway line was located there between 1878 and 1985.

Currabubula has a public school and a hotel. The annual Currabubula Red Cross Art Exhibition takes place there. Agriculture is the major industry in the area. Important agricultural activities include the production of beef cattle, sheep and grain. Currabubula is also renowned as a 'horse friendly' village, with hundreds of acres of Travelling Stock Reserves available to the trail rider.

Preceding station	Former services	Following station
Belgamba towards Wallangarra	Main Northern Line	Warrigundi towards Sydney
