= Jack Walsh (rugby league) =

Australian rugby league footballer and coach

Personal information
- Full name: Jack Patrick Walsh
- Born: 24 August 1917 Taree, New South Wales, Australia
- Died: 19 March 1980 (aged 62)

Playing information
- Position: Prop
Club
Years	Team	Pld	T	G	FG	P
1937–44	South Sydney	96	12	0	0	36
1945–50	Western Suburbs	40	7	0	0	21
	Total	136	19	0	0	57
Representative
Years	Team	Pld	T	G	FG	P
1947	New South Wales	2	0	0	0	0

Coaching information
Club
Years	Team	Gms	W	D	L	W%
1946–57	Western Suburbs	55	26	2	25	47
- Source: As of 19 February 2019

Jack Walsh nicknamed "Duck" (24 August 1917 – 19 March 1980) was an Australian professional rugby league footballer who played in the 1930s, 1940s and 1950s. He played for South Sydney and Western Suburbs as a prop.

== Playing career ==
Walsh made his first grade debut for Souths against Canterbury-Bankstown in 1937. In 1939, Walsh played for Souths in the 1939 grand final against Balmain where the club lost heavily by a score of 33–4 at the Sydney Cricket Ground.

In 1945, Walsh joined Western Suburbs and became captain coach in 1946. Walsh was a member of their third premiership winning team defeating Balmain 8–5 in the 1948 grand final. Walsh played two more seasons for Wests before retiring at the end of 1950.

== Coaching career ==
Walsh coached Western Suburbs in 1956 and 1957. In both his seasons as coach, Wests qualified for the finals.
