= Jeff Smith (rugby league) =

Australian rugby league footballer and coach

Personal information
- Full name: Jeff Smith

Coaching information
Club
Years	Team	Gms	W	D	L	W%
1948–51	Western Suburbs	64	40	2	22	63

Jeff Smith was an Australian rugby league coach. He coached Western Suburbs in the New South Wales Rugby League (NSWRL) competition.

== Coaching career ==
Smith began his coaching career with Western Suburbs in 1948, a year after Frank Burge had taken the club to the finals. Smith guided Wests to the 1948 minor premiership only losing two games throughout the home-and-away season. Western Suburbs would go on to reach the grand final against Balmain. In the grand final, Western Suburbs prevailed 8–5 at the Sydney Sports Ground winning their third premiership. Smith joined unique company being one of the few coaches to win a premiership in their first season.

In 1949, Smith stepped down as head coach for one season and was replaced by Col Maxwell. In 1950, Smith returned as head coach. Smith guided Wests to fourth place and qualified them for the finals. Western Suburbs would go on to reach the 1950 NSWRFL grand final against South Sydney. Souths would go on to win the match 21–15.

In 1951, Smith again guided Western Suburbs to the finals. Western Suburbs would go on to be eliminated by Manly-Warringah 9–37 in the semi-final at the Sydney Cricket Ground. This was Smith's last game as head coach and he stepped down following the defeat. The following year, Western Suburbs would go on to win their fourth and final premiership.
