= Arthur Patton =

Australian RL coach and former rugby league footballer

- Patton 1947

Personal information
- Full name: Arthur William Patton
- Born: 20 October 1916 Figtree, New South Wales, Australia
- Died: 20 April 1990 (aged 73) Leichhardt, New South Wales, Australia

Playing information
- Position: Wing
Club
Years	Team	Pld	T	G	FG	P
1937–48	Balmain	117	95	9	0	303
Representative
Years	Team	Pld	T	G	FG	P
1939	NSW Country	1	0	0	0	0
1944	NSW City	1	0	0	0	0

Coaching information
Club
Years	Team	Gms	W	D	L	W%
1952–53	Balmain	36	15	0	21	42

Arthur William Patton (1916–1990) was an Australian rugby league footballer who played in the 1930s and 1940s, and later became a coach and administrator. His playing, coaching & administrative career was the Balmain club in Sydney.

== Career ==
Originally from Figtree, New South Wales, Patton was a flying winger and prolific try scorer who played twelve seasons for the Balmain club between 1937 and 1948.

He was the first player in the club's history to score more than 100 tries (in all grades). He was also a top class sprinter during the late 1930s, and placed third in the Stawell Gift in 1937. He also competed in the race in 1938 and 1939.

Patton won three premierships with Balmain : 1944 (as captain), 1946 and 1947. He is regarded as one of the greatest ever Balmain players.

== Post playing ==
Patton coached Balmain in 1952 and 1953, and later became the Balmain Club Secretary in 1973.

== Death ==
Patton died of cancer on 20 April 1990 aged 73.

== Accolades ==
In 2007, Patton was named in the Balmain team of the century.

Sporting positions
Preceded by Jim Duckworth; 1951	Coach Balmain Tigers; 1952–1953	Succeeded by Norm Robinson; 1954–1956
