= Kevin Hansen (rugby league) =

Australian rugby league footballer

Personal information
- Full name: Kevin Hansen
- Born: 18 September 1927 Sydney, New South Wales, Australia
- Died: 29 January 1971 (aged 43) Sydney, New South Wales, Australia

Playing information
- Position: Prop
Club
Years	Team	Pld	T	G	FG	P
1947–53	Western Suburbs	110	19	0	0	57
1956	Eastern Suburbs	10	1	0	0	3
	Total	120	20	0	0	60
Representative
Years	Team	Pld	T	G	FG	P
1949–55	New South Wales	4	2	0	0	6
1952	Australia	1	0	0	0	0
1947–53	NSW City	2	0	0	0	0

Kevin Hansen (1927−1971) was an Australian professional rugby league footballer who played in the 1940s and 1950s. He played for Western Suburbs and Eastern Suburbs as a prop.

== Playing career ==
Hansen made his debut for Western Suburbs in 1947. The following year he was a member of the Wests side which claimed their third premiership, defeating Balmain 8–5 in the grand final, with Hansen scoring the winning try.

In 1952, Hansen won his second premiership with Western Suburbs and the club's fourth as they defeated South Sydney 22–12 in the 1952 grand final. This would be the last premiership Western Suburbs would win before exiting the competition in 1999. Hansen played three more seasons with Wests before playing a single season with Eastern Suburbs then retiring.

At representative level, Hansen played for NSW City, New South Wales and Australia. He died in 1971 from leukemia, aged 43.
