= Raper =

Raper is a synonym for a rapist, someone who commits rape. It is also a Northern English variation of the English surname Roper, meaning "maker of ropes".

== People with the surname ==
- Aaron Raper (born 1971), Australian rugby league footballer and coach
- The Raper brothers:
  - Arthur F. Raper (1899–1979), American sociologist
  - Kenneth B. Raper (1908–1987), American mycologist
  - John R. Raper (1911–1974), American mycologist
    - Cardy Raper (1925–2019), American mycologist, wife of John R. Raper
- Catherine Charlotte Raper, English pastellist
- Dean Raper, Australian rugby league footballer
- Edward Raper (1806–1882), Irish-born Australian politician
- Elizabeth Raper, Australian judge
- George Raper (1769–1796), British naval officer and illustrator
- Henry Raper (1799–1859), British naval officer and navigator
- Henry Raper (Royal Navy officer) (1767–1845), British Royal Navy admiral
- Horace Walter Raper, British businessman
- John F. Raper (1913–1993), American justice
- Johnny Raper (1939–2022), Australian rugby league footballer and coach
- Judy Raper (born 1954), Australian chemical engineer
- Kenny Raper, English footballer
- Kevin Raper, American politician
- Mark Raper, Australian Jesuit priest
- Matthew Raper (1705–1778), English astronomer and mathematician
- Maurie Raper, Australian rugby league footballer
- Peter Raper, Australian rower
- Ron Raper (born 1945), Australian rugby league footballer and coach
- Sarah Raper, British climatologist
- Stanley Raper (1909–1997), English cricketer
- Stuart Raper (born 1965), Australian rugby league footballer and coach
- Tony Raper, British Army general

== See also ==
- Battle Raper, series of Japanese fighting games controversial for its simulation of rape
- Cape Raper, Nunavut, Canada
