= Roope =

Roope is a name. As a given name, Roope is the Finnish variant of Robert, while as a surname, it is an English occupational surname associated with rope makers or rope sellers.

== Given name ==
- Roope Ahonen (born 1990), Finnish basketball player
- Roope Gröndahl (born 1989), Finnish pianist
- Roope Hämäläinen (born 1992), Finnish ice hockey player
- Roope Hintz (born 1996), Finnish ice hockey player
- Roope Jussila (1943 – 2013), Finnish Counselor
- Roope Kakko (born 1982), Finnish golfer
- Roope Kinnunen, stage name RoopeK, Finnish rapper
- Roope Laavainen (born 1998), Finnish ice hockey player
- Roope Latvala (born 1970), Finnish guitarist
- Roope Nikkilä (born 1990), Finnish ice hockey player
- Roope Noronen (born 1974), president of American Football Association of Finland
- Roope Ranta (born 1988), Finnish ice hockey player
- Roope Riski (born 1991), Finnish footballer
- Roope Salminen (born 1989), Finnish TV personality, singer and actor
- Roope Suomalainen (born 1973), retired Finnish sailor
- Roope Talaja (born 1988), Finnish ice hockey player
- Roope Tonteri (born 1992), Finnish snowboarder

== Surname ==
- Fay Roope (1893–1961), American actor
- Gerard Broadmead Roope (1905–1940), British Royal Navy officer awarded the Victoria Cross posthumously
- Graham Roope (1946–2006), English cricketer
- Nicolas Roope (born 1972), British entrepreneur

== See also ==
- Roop (disambiguation)
- Roopa
- Rooper
- Roper (disambiguation)
