= History of the Cronulla-Sutherland Sharks =

The history of the Cronulla-Sutherland Sharks rugby League Football Club goes back to its foundation in the 1960s.

== 1960s ==
Cronulla rugby league club was founded in 1963 under the banner of Cronulla-Caringbah. They entered the inter-district competition, playing against Wentworthville, Sydney University, Penrith and other clubs in the Sydney area.

In 1967 the New South Wales Rugby Football League (NSWRFL) added two new clubs to the competition, Cronulla-Sutherland and Penrith, the first to join the competition since Parramatta and Manly were admi In mid-1968 the club moved permanently to Endeavour Field at Woolooware, thus becoming the only club in Sydney to own their own ground. Their first match there was against Parramatta and the Cronulla-Sutherland Sharks won 10–7.

== 1970s ==
Captain-coached by Englishman Tommy Bishop, Cronulla-Sutherland made the end-of-season play-offs for the first time in 1973. They lost only five games and finished just one point behind minor premiers Manly, and ahead of local rivals St George. The Sharks made it to the grand final against the Sea Eagles but in a brutal encounter lost 10–7.

Cronulla-Sutherland met the Sea Eagles again in the 1978 grand final, amidst much controversy surrounding referee Greg Hartley. The Sharks led by 7–2 well into the second half. Manly came back and brought the scoreboard to 11–7. It took a late penalty goal from Steve Rogers to level scores at 11-all by full-time. The replay saw the Sharks' opportunity pass by as they fielded a much-weakened team due to further injuries, eventually being shut-out by Manly 16–0. Cronulla were without suspended stars Greg Pierce and Dane Sorensen in both games, while hooker John McMartin, fullback Mick Mullane and Barry Andrews were all injured for the replay.

In 1979, Cronulla won the mid-week Amco Cup competition, their first trophy in the top grade, beating Combined Brisbane 22–5.

== 1980s ==
Cronulla suffered major financial trouble in 1983, with the NSWRL appointing an administrator and providing a loan. Western Suburbs and Newtown, both in a similar predicament, were refused a loan, with Newtown being forced out of the competition. However, the season wasn't all bad for Cronulla, with the emergence of teenage star, Andrew Ettingshausen, who was named Rookie of the Year, and would later go on to become the most capped and successful player for Cronulla. Cronulla also made the final of the mid-week KB Cup, but lost again to Manly, 26–6.

In 1985, Cronulla was buoyed by the arrival of 'super coach' Jack Gibson, who had coached Easts and Parramatta to premierships. Gibson left the club in good shape in 1987, with the promise fulfilled in 1988 when Cronulla won the minor premiership, led by veteran second-rower Gavin Miller, who was named Dally M Player of the Year, and Rothmans Medal winning halfback, Barry Russell. However, Russell dislocated his shoulder two weeks before the finals, and missed the semi-final where Cronulla went down to Canterbury. He was rushed back in for the final against Balmain, but he was severely hampered by the injury, and Cronulla were bundled out. A bright spot for the Sharks, though, was the selection in the Australian team of Miller, and young centres, Ettingshausen and Mark McGaw.

In 1989, Cronulla sneaked into the finals after thrashing Illawarra 46–14 in the final round, followed by a memorable 38–14 victory over the Brisbane Broncos in the play-off for fifth position. However, they could not repeat the performance in their semi-final against eventual premiers Canberra, in what was their third game in seven days. Gavin Miller was rewarded for another great year with both the Dally M Player of the Year award and the Rothmans Medal.

== 1990s ==
Cronulla again dropped into a period of poor form and financial trouble in 1990, but the appointment as coach of rugby league Immortal, Arthur Beetson, in 1992 helped turn the on-field problems around. He helped develop a batch of promising players, including five-eighth Mitch Healey, fullback David Peachey, winger Richie Barnett, prop Adam Ritson, and hooker Aaron Raper, son of another Immortal, Johnny Raper. However, Cronulla were forced into receivership in 1993.

In 1993 Lou Ferrigno was brought in to speak to Sharks players about the benefits of weight-training.

Beetson was replaced as coach in 1994 by John Lang, a former Australian hooker, and coach of the Brisbane Easts team. Lang brought halfback, Paul Green, down from Brisbane with him. A golden age for the club had begun, signalled by the two lower grade teams (President's Cup and Reserve grade) winning their competitions. During John Lang's coaching period, from 1994 to 2001, Cronulla made the semi-finals every year except for 1994 and 1998. The club had a glamorous image and attracted record crowds, with a corresponding financial improvement.

In 1995, Cronulla were one of the first clubs to join the Super League competition, which kicked off after protracted legal battles and much bitterness, in 1997. The club was motivated by a dissatisfaction with the perceived favouritism of the NSWRL administration towards other clubs, and a still-risky financial situation.

They reached the inaugural - and only - grand final of the ten-team competition, Cronulla made the Super League grand final and went on to lose to Brisbane 26–12 in Brisbane. The game was notable for being the only grand final to be played outside Sydney. The club rejoined the reunited National Rugby League competition in 1998.

Arguably the Sharks' best season ever was in 1999, when they again won the minor premiership in convincing fashion. The Sharks easily accounted for the Brisbane Broncos in the quarter-final, and led 8–0 in the grand final qualifier against the St George Illawarra Dragons before eventually losing 8–24. The Dragons went on to lose the 1999 grand final against the Melbourne Storm 20–18.

== 2000s ==
Cronulla lost the grand final qualifier in similar circumstances in 2001, to eventual premiers Newcastle. The year was marked by the sudden rise of halfback Preston Campbell, who was named Dally M Player of the Year, despite being a fringe first grader at the start of the season.

In 2002, John Lang was replaced by Australian coach, Chris Anderson, who had led Canterbury Bulldogs and Melbourne Storm to premierships. The following two years were the most acrimonious in the club's history. The first year was almost an on-field success, as Anderson retained the core of John Lang's team, and the Sharks again reached the grand final qualifier. However another heartbreaking loss to New Zealand, the replacement of halfback Campbell - a crowd favourite - with former Melbourne halfback Brett Kimmorley, and a string of released players signalled trouble for 2003.

This was realised with the sudden mid-season departure of long-time stars, Nick Graham and Dean Treister. The Sharks finished 11th, suffering a record 74–4 loss to Parramatta in a match marred by the controversial performance of referee, Shayne Hayne. Three Cronulla players were sent from the field, including Sharks captain David Peachey, for ignoring the referee's instructions. Constant infighting between the board and the coach led to Anderson's departure at the end of the season.

Anderson was replaced by Stuart Raper, another son of Johnny Raper, and the coach of the President's Cup winning team in 1994. A loyal clubman, he instantly brought a revival in club and supporter spirit. The club's name reverted to Cronulla-Sutherland.

Steve Rogers, the CEO of the Cronulla Sharks and a former club legend, died on 3 January 2006 at the age of 51 from a "mixture of prescription drugs and alcohol." In April, 2006, the NSW state coroner ruled that the death was accidental.

On 21 April 2006, the Australian Government announced they would be funding a $9.6 million upgrade to Toyota Park. Funding will be going towards extending the E.T. Stand.

Cronulla finished the 2006 season in disastrous fashion. After winning 8 out of 9 games in the middle of the season and climbing to near the top of the ladder, the team experienced the worst losing streak in the club's history, losing their last 10 games. In a bizarre finish to a tumultuous season, the Sharks narrowly failed to win their final game after coming back from 26–0 down to lose 26–24 to Canberra. A missed penalty goal in the dying seconds of the match would have sent the game into extra-time, allowing the chance for Cronulla to equal the biggest single-game comeback in the history of top-level rugby league in Australia.

On 22 September 2006, the Sharks Board ended weeks of speculation over the future of coach Stuart Raper by sacking him as first grade coach and handing him a $300,000 payout, making him the second consecutive coach to receive such a payout. On 26 September, Australian Test coach Ricky Stuart signed a 3-year deal to coach the Sharks from 2007, replacing Raper.

Round one of the 2007 season saw the Sharks break their 10-game losing streak against the Penrith Panthers with an 18-0 victory at Toyota Park. Ricky Stuart, despite being somewhat hampered by the decisions of former coach Raper in the team he inherited, led the Sharks to fifth on the ladder at the halfway mark of the season surprising multiple critics. Towards the end of the season, Cronulla plunged to 15th on the league ladder, slumping to seven straight losses. The season ended with the Sharks in 11th place, rounding off a heartbreaking season, with the club losing no less than nine matches by 4 points or less.

The Sharks had a strong season in 2008, finishing the season in equal first spot (third on for and against). They had one of the best defensive records, but one of the worst attacking records in the league. They had an excellent start to the season, beating defending grand finalists Manly and premiers Melbourne in away games in the first two rounds. After a comprehensive 36–10 victory over Canberra in the Qualifying Final at Toyota Stadium, Cronulla were beaten 28–0 by Melbourne (who later were found to be over the salary cap and cheating) in the Preliminary Final at the Sydney Football Stadium. This was a disappointing end to an otherwise successful season.

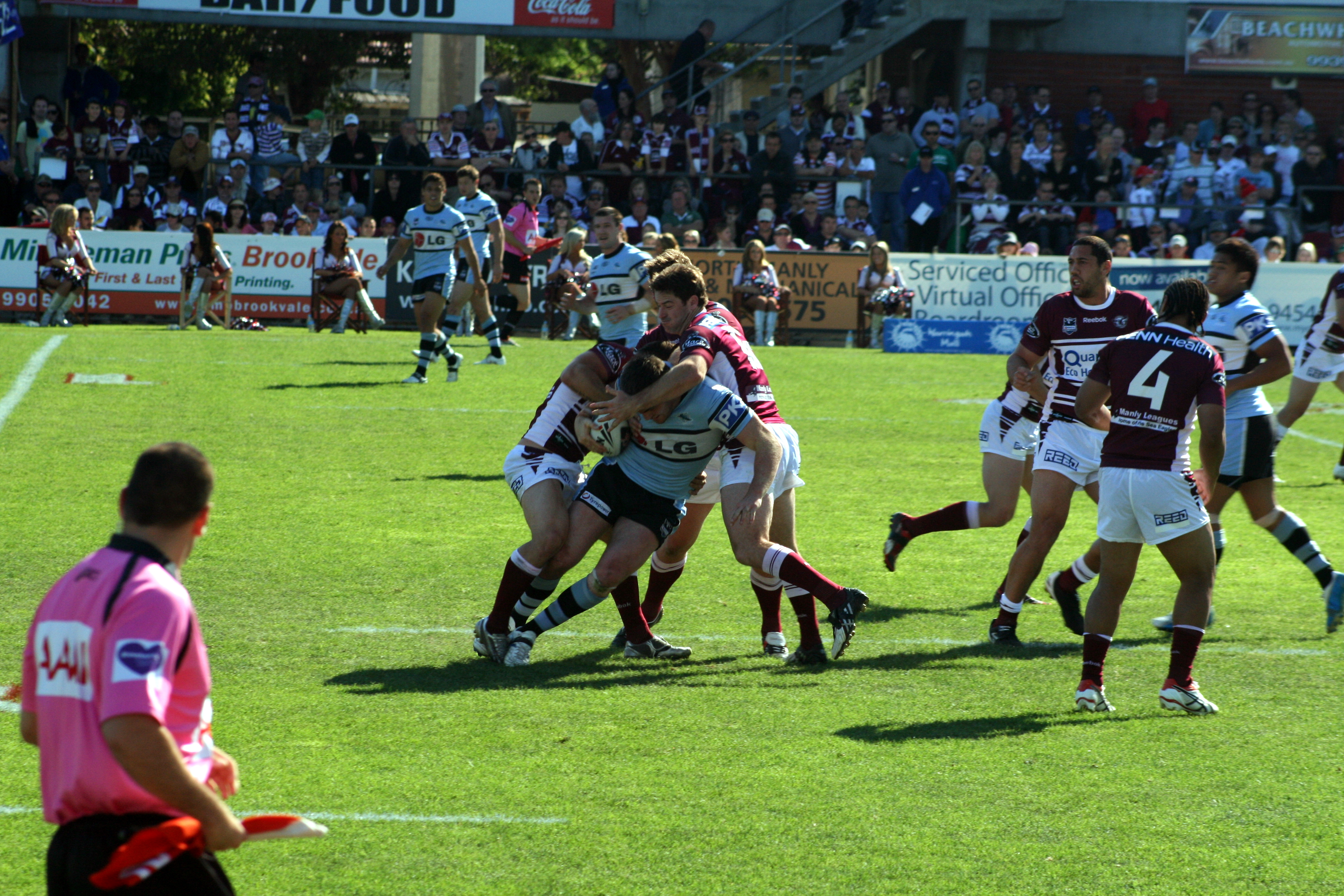
Cronulla attack Manly in August 2009

During the 2009 season Cronulla's dire financial problems became public knowledge. Asset-rich, owning its stadium and the surrounding land, but with cash flow problems due to its low average home gate and poor on-field performances in recent seasons, the club announced plans for a partial relocation to the Central Coast, which was rebuffed by the NRL. It was to split home games for the 2010–14 seasons among:

- 6 at Toyota Park, to include local derbies with the St George Illawarra Dragons and Canterbury-Bankstown Bulldogs,
- 5 at Central Coast Stadium in Gosford, Central Coast, and
- 1 at Hindmarsh Stadium in Adelaide, South Australia.

On 26 May 2009 businessman Damian Irvine, together with a fresh board of directors, took over control of the club as the St George Bank were threatening to foreclose.

The recorded 9 straight losses after a win in Round 1 in 2009 and despite a mid-season revival with four straight wins, the Cronulla side slipped to ten straight defeats to equal the club's worst losing streak. One of these losses caused great controversy as the Sharks, playing against Manly, were forced to field just 12 men for most of the game after Luke Douglas was sent off by referee Phil Haines for a careless high tackle. The Sharks managed to avoid the wooden spoon in 2009 when the Roosters were soundly beaten by the Cowboys in the final round, resulting in a lower overall standing than the Sharks, with avoiding last position a rare positive in a horror season for the Cronulla club.

== 2010s ==
The start of the 2010 season saw the Sharks return confident of turning around recent disappointing results, however on-field performance remained poor. After the board developed a plan to refinance debt and a long-term financial strategy, Richard Fisk resigned in June 2010 due to his failure to find common ground with Chairman Irvine and his Board and a failure to refresh the commercial area of the club. The club's head coach, Ricky Stuart, also tendered his resignation and was replaced towards the back end of the season by his then-assistant coach Shane Flanagan.

Promising wing/centre Blake Ferguson was criticized for comments about wanting to leave the club in order to achieve success. On Tuesday, July 20 Ricky Stuart left the Sharks for the rest of the season after admitting he could get no more out of the players and had "lost" them. Chairman Irvine opted to give a chance to Assistant NSW and Cronulla coach Shane Flanagan. After departing, Stuart and Fisk also cited fractured relationships with Chairman Damian Irvine as a reason for their departure despite the club making positive strides off-field under his guidance and commitment.

The 2011 season started so promising for the club. The addition of Wade Graham at five-eighth and New Zealand international Jeremy Smith to a pack already containing two origin players promised an end to the Sharks' status as cellar-dwellers. Despite being humiliated by the Raiders at Canberra Stadium in round one, 40–12, the club won its next two matches. They beat defending premiers St. George Illawarra 16–10 at home in round two, and smashed Penrith 44–12 at Centerbet Stadium. Missing a number of first-team starters due to injury, the Sharks then lost five in a row to the Warriors (26–18), Sea Eagles (19–13), Knights (24–20), Cowboys (30–12), and Rabbitohs (31–12), dropping down the table, from 9th to 15th. They broke their hoodoo in round ten, when they beat the struggling Sydney Roosters 18–4 at Toyota Stadium. They were again disappointing in round eleven, when they were defeated 40–6 by the Eels at Parramatta Stadium. Despite losing 14–8 to the Storm in round 12, they were much improved and forced the Storm into a classic showdown at AAMI Park in Melbourne. They then faced the Broncos at home in round 13, going down 34–16, before a bye in round 14 gave them the chance to regroup. While the Sharks were taking a much needed break skipper Paul Gallen led the NSW Blues Origin team to a memorable 18–8 victory over Queensland. He then played outstandingly for the Sharks in their round 15 match against the Bulldogs just three days after the State of Origin match, a game in which Cronulla beat Canterbury-Bankstown 26-10. The next four weeks saw a turnaround of the club's performance, with victory over the Gold Coast Titans 36–12 and the South Sydney Rabbitohs 24–4, before they took revenge against the Canberra Raiders 26–12.

Cronulla lost their two props for the 2012 season, Origin representative Kade Snowden to Newcastle and Luke Douglas signing for the Gold Coast Titans. Captain Paul Gallen's transformation into an Origin prop alleviated this problem somewhat, and the Sharks were active in the player market, signing prop Jon Green from St George Illawarra, former Shark Isaac de Gois, prop Mark Taufua from Newcastle, halfback Jeff Robson from Parramatta and props Bryce Gibbs and Andrew Fifita from Wests Tigers.

2012 began very well for the club under Chairman Damian Irvine, Coach Shane Flanagan. The recruitment by Mooney and Flanagan paid dividends with new recruits Jeff Robson, Andrew Fifita, Todd Carney, Ben Ross, Isaac De Gois and Mark Taufua taking pressure off Paul Gallen allowing him to hit a purple patch of form. The club won 6 matches in a row for the first time in over a decade and after 8 rounds were sitting third on the table as the highest placed Sydney based franchise.

A difficult State of Origin period saw injuries to captain Paul Gallen and star Todd Carney. The Sharks struggled to recover and struggled in the back half of the year, however still capped a remarkable turnaround by qualifying for their first finals series in 4 years, losing to Canberra in week one. The match notable for seeing Paul Gallen outplayed by young rival Josh Papalli and Todd Carney injuring his Achilles.

Sponsorship deals with SHARK Energy Drink, Fisherman's Friend, and Luxbet flooded in and helped the financial situation off-field, with the close of Season 2012 seeing Shane Flanagan emerge as one of the game's leading up and coming head coaches and his mentor Damian Irvine the game's leading young administrator.

At the beginning of Season 2013, Irvine stood down as chairman on learning of the questionable operational and duty of care practices of coach Shane Flanagan, and Darren Mooney during 2011 which exposed the club to the ASADA scandal. Flanagan was stood down and Peter Sharp stepped up to the head coaching role. Flanagan returned in 2013, a season in which the Sharks qualified for the competition semi finals, before he was forced to serve a 9-month suspension handed down by the NRL for breaches of basic governance and duty of care practices, thus validating the strong ethical stance made by Irvine and the board in March 2013.

Sharp again took over the reins, before resigning mid season the week after the club's greatest comeback victory, with the team coming from 22 nil down to beat the Brisbane Broncos 24–22. Following that win, a photo went viral of Sharks playmaker Todd Carney urinating into his own mouth. Just one day after Carney was stood down by the Sharks CEO Steve Noyce, Sharp resigned as interim head coach and was replaced by James Shepherd.

The 2014 season saw a myriad of struggles for the Sharks on the field, with injuries and the suspension of five players involved in the supplements scandal of 2011, missing games at the back end of the season. The Sharks finished 2014 with the wooden spoon.

In 2015, the club climbed the ladder to eventually finish 6th with 2 wins over eventual minor premiers Sydney Roosters and 2014's premiers South Sydney Rabbitohs. 2015 was also the year Flanagan was reappointed as coach of Cronulla after sitting out the 2014 season.

In 2016, an unprecedented record of 15 straight wins for the club saw them climb to the top of the table, before slipping to 3rd with a loss to the Melbourne Storm on the final round of the normal season. The club eventually went on to win the competition for the first time in their history after triumphing over both the Canberra Raiders and the Melbourne Storm.

2017 saw the club finish 5th with 15 wins and 9 losses across the season, with a number of players reaching milestones with the club, with Paul Gallen, Luke Lewis and Chris Heighington reaching 300 NRL matches throughout their careers. The 2017 season also saw players of the Grand Final squad who were key to winning the competition the previous season depart at the end of the season, with Jack Bird heading to the Brisbane Broncos and James Maloney traded to the Penrith Panthers for Matt Moylan.

The 2018 season saw the club finish 4th, tied on points with the three other clubs above them. New additions to the team included Josh Dugan, Matt Moylan and Scott Sorensen, as well as Trent Hodkinson who would go on to leave midway during the season to join up with the Manly Warringah Sea Eagles. Heading into the finals series, allegations were made that the club may have been in breach of the salary cap during the 2015 and 2017 seasons by The Daily Telegraph, which was later confirmed to be true by the club after admitting that they had self-reported themselves to the NRL several months earlier after coming under new leadership. Having finished 4th, the Sharks were to play the minor premiers, and eventual winners of the competition, the Sydney Roosters, going down 21 to 12. The match also saw Wade Graham depart the field with an ACL tear which would rule him out for the rest of the series and for part of the 2019 season. Their Semi-Final matchup with the Penrith Panthers saw them win by a single field goal, kicked by Chad Townsend to give them the lead at 21–20, despite having led the Panthers at half-time 18 to 2. Their next match against the Melbourne Storm saw them lose to the eventual runners-up 22 to 6. Due to the loss, the match marked the end of Luke Lewis' playing career, with the player having announced his retirement earlier in the season. The match also threatened to end Storm legend Billy Slater's playing career, with the player - having also announced retirement during the season – performing an alleged illegal shoulder charge and therefore professional foul on Sharks winger Sosaia Feki who was in the act of scoring. Despite being penalised for the action, Slater managed to avoid both the Sin Bin and a suspension, with the NRL judiciary controversially ruling his tackle not a shoulder charge.

== Supplements scandal ==
The beginning of the 2013 NRL Season saw the Sharks investigated by ASADA (Australian Sports Anti-Doping Agency) and reports led back to Sports scientist Stephen Dank who Shane Flanagan and Trainer Trent Elkin introduced to the club, and statements that he had administered peptides to a number of Sharks players. The investigations resulted in the sacking of four of the Cronulla Sharks' staff members for their involvement and cover up. They were Darren Mooney, Mark Noakes, David Giveny and Konrad Schultz. Flanagan was stood down from his coaching duties in 2014 before guiding the Sharks to the finals series in 2015.

The Sharks finished the 2013 season in 5th place on the ladder, before winning their first finals game in a controversial 20–18 victory over the Cowboys. They went down the following week 24–18 to the Manly-Warringah Sea Eagles to bow out of premiership contention. Cronulla were commended for their bravery throughout the whole of the season by not letting off-field distractions (namely the ASADA investigation) deter their on-field performances, however 2014 proved to be a different story, with interim coaches and player injury and suspension seeing the club finish the year with the Wooden Spoon.

== 2016: First Premiership ==
The 2016 season started with a 20–14 loss over 2015 premiers, North Queensland Cowboys. This was followed by a 30–2 win over the St. George Illawarra Dragons and a loss to Manly-Warringah, 22–12. The Sharks then went on to win 15 games in a row from Round 4 against the Melbourne Storm to Round 21, against the Gold Coast Titans, resulting in an 18-all draw. This was the largest win streak in the club's history. During this period the Sharks equaled their largest win score by defeating the Newcastle Knights 62–0.

They then went on to win 1 out of their last 5 games resulting in a drop from 1st to 3rd. In round 26, the Cronulla-Sutherland Sharks and Melbourne Storm faced off in a minor premiership showdown in which the Melbourne Storm won 26–6 in AAMI Park. They went on to defeat the Raiders in the Week 1 qualifying final 16–14 and earning the week off. Advancing to the Preliminary final, they defeated defending premiers North Queensland Cowboys 32–20 at the Sydney Football Stadium. They would face and defeat the Melbourne Storm in the 2016 NRL Grand Final. The Sharks, after leading 8–0 at half-time, prevailed in a gripping affair 14–12 to claim their first premiership in the club's 50-year history. Sharks second rower Luke Lewis was awarded the Clive Churchill Medal as Man of the Match.

Soon after the Maiden premiership victory star player Ben Barba tested positive for Cocaine and was sacked from the club. Chairman Damien Keogh who rose to the position on a platform of commercial experience garnered from his role as CEO of HOYTS Australia, was also arrested for possession of Cocaine whilst in Sydney's CBD and was stood down and removed from the position of Sharks Chairman as a result.

In 2019 the club became embroiled in a salary cap scandal relating to breaches stretching back to 2013. While they were fined and forced to play under a reduced salary cap for the next two seasons, the NRL determined the club had been playing within the salary cap during the 2016 season and the club's maiden title was never under threat.

== 2017: World Club Challenge ==
The Sharks played Wigan Warriors at the DW Stadium on 19 February 2017, losing 22–6 to a strong Wigan side.
