= Roper (surname) =

Origin
- Meaning: occupational name for a maker or seller of rope

Other names
- Variant forms: Rooper, Raper, Rapier, Repper

Roper is an English surname. Notable people with the surname include:

== Roper family ==
- William Roper (1496–1578), attorney general of Henry VIII, was offered a Dukedom, but declined it.
- Margaret Roper (1505–1544), English, writer, and daughter to Thomas More
- John Roper, 1st Baron Teynham (c. 1534–1618)
- Christopher Roper, 2nd Baron Teynham (1561–1622)
- Sir Thomas Roper, 1st Viscount Baltinglass (1587–1638)
- Elizabeth Roper (d. 1658), English courtier
- Henry Roper, 8th Baron Teynham (c. 1676–1723)
- Henry John Philip Sidney Roper-Curzon, 18th Baron Teynham (1867–1936)
- Christopher John Henry Roper-Curzon, 19th Baron Teynham (1896–1972)
- Hugh Trevor-Roper (1914–2003), Baron Dacre of Glanton
- John Christopher Ingham Roper-Curzon, 20th Baron Teynham (1928–2021)

== Politicians ==
- Daniel Calhoun Roper (1867–1943), American politician
- Elmer Roper (1893–1994), Canadian politician
- Sandra Roper (born 1956), American lawyer and politician from New York
- John Roper, Baron Roper (1935–2016), British politician

== Academics and writers ==
- Brian Roper (academic), vice-chancellor of London Met
- Clyde Roper (born 1937), zoologist known for his research on giant squid
- L. David Roper (born 1935), discoverer of the Roper resonance in particle physics and genealogist
- Lyndal Roper, Fellow at Oriel College and author of Witch Craze
- Nancy Roper (1918–2004), British nurse theorist and lexicographer

== Sportspeople ==
- Brian Roper (Gaelic footballer), Irish Gaelic footballer
- Don Roper (1922–2001), English footballer
- Jim Roper (1916–2000), race driver
- John Roper, American baseball pitcher
- Justin Roper (born 1987), American football player
- Steve Roper, American rock climber
- Tony Roper (racing driver) (1964–2000), pickup race driver

== Entertainers ==
- Brian Roper (actor) (1929–1994), British and American actor
- David Roper, British actor
- Deidra Muriel Roper (born 1948), American DJ and singer.
- George Roper, British stand-up comedian
- Lizzie Roper (born 1968), British actress
- Reese Roper, singer/songwriter for Five Iron Frenzy, Brave Saint Saturn, and Roper
- Todd Roper, drummer for the band Deathray
- Skid Roper, American musician
- Jake Roper, host of YouTube science show Vsauce 3

== Other people ==
- Abel Roper (1665–1726), English journalist and publisher
- Moses Roper (c. 1810 – c. 1861), slave born in North Carolina who escaped to England and wrote a book about his slavery experiences
- Elmo Roper (1900–1971), founder of the Roper Opinion Research Company (the "Roper Poll"), later renamed Roper Starch Worldwide Company
- Jesse M. Roper (1851–1901), American navy officer
- Joanna Roper (born 1969), British civil servant and diplomat
- Lanning Roper (1912–1983), American-born English gardener
- Kevin Roper, animator for Hanna-Barbera in the 1970s
- Patrick Trevor-Roper (1916–2004), British surgeon and gay rights activist
- Sylvester Howard Roper (1823–1896), inventor of the motorcycle
- Shirley Phelps-Roper (born 1957), de facto spokesman for the Topeka, Kansas-based Westboro Baptist Church, daughter of Fred Phelps

== Fictional characters ==
- George Roper, fictional character in the British sitcom George and Mildred.
- Stanley Roper, a character in the sitcoms Three's Company and its spinoff The Ropers.
- Scott Roper, a character played by Eddie Murphy in Metro (1997 film).
- Steve Roper, a character in the comic strip Steve Roper and Mike Nomad.
- Roper, a character played by John Saxon in Enter the Dragon.
- Richard Onslow Roper, a character from John le Carré's novel The Night Manager.

== See also ==
- Roper (disambiguation)
- Roeper
- Baron Teynham, peerage held by the Roper family since 1616
