= Rupa =

Rupa may refer to:

== Places ==
- Rupa, Arunachal Pradesh, India, a town
- Rupa, Croatia, a town
- Rupa, Kranj, a former village, now part of the city of Kranj, Slovenia
- Rupa gold mine, Uganda
- Rupa Lake, Nepal

== Organizations ==
- RUPA, Rugby Union Players Association, Australia
- Rupa Company, an Indian clothing company
- Rupa Publications an Indian publishing company

== Other uses ==
- Rūpa, Devanagari for "form", with various meanings in Indic religions
- Rupa (beetle), a beetle genus
- Rupa (name), a given name
- Revised Uniform Partnership Act, a United States law

== See also ==
- Rup (disambiguation)
- Roop (disambiguation)
- Roopa, a given name
