= Roop =

Roop or ROOP may refer to:

== Arts, entertainment, and media ==
- Roop - Mard Ka Naya Swaroop, Indian television show
- The Roop, a Lithuanian pop rock band

== People ==
=== With the first name ===
- Roop Durgapal, Indian actress
- Roop Kanwar (c. 1969–1987), Rajput woman
- Roop Mallik (born 1970), Indian biophysicist
- Roop Rani, Bharatiya Janata Party MLA in the Punjab Legislative Assembly
- Roop Rathod (born 1960), Indian musician
- Roop Singh (1908–1977), Indian hockey player
- Roop Singh (cricketer), Indian cricketer
- Roop Nath Singh Yadav, Indian politician

=== With the surname ===
- Bob Roop (born 1942), American wrestler
- Carl "Bill" Roop, American politician
- Clawson Roop (1888–1972), director of the United States Bureau of the Budget
- George Roop (born 1981), American mixed martial artist
- Isaac Roop (1822–1869), American politician
- Joyce Elaine Roop (1952–1995), American attorney and environmental activist
- Mrs. Roop, a recurring character in the Disney Channel TV show The Ghost and Molly McGee

== Places ==
- Roop County, Nevada, United States, a former county
- Roop's Mill, a historic grist mill near Westminster, Maryland, United States
- Straupe, a village in the Pārgauja municipality of Latvia, also called Roop

== See also ==
- Rupa (disambiguation)
- Roopa (actress), Indian actress
- Roope (name)
- Roops
