= Rapier (disambiguation) =

A rapier is a slender, sharply pointed sword.

Rapier may also refer to:

== Surname ==
An English variant of Roper (surname).

=== People ===
- April Rapier, American photographer
- George M. Rapier III, American businessman
- James T. Rapier, American politician
- John L. Rapier, American Civil War soldier and businessman
- Kenny Rapier, American politician

=== Fictional characters ===
- Rapier (comics), a fictional character in the Marvel Comics universe

== Objects ==
- A device that is employed in a rapier loom
- Rapier (missile), a British surface-to-air missile
- Sunbeam Rapier, the first of the "Audax" range of light cars
- Napier Rapier, a British designed engine
- Lagonda Rapier, a small car
- Maersk Rapier, an oil tanker on permanent assignment to the UK Ministry of Defence
- North American XF-108 Rapier, a proposed long-range aircraft
- Hernandez Rapier 65, a homebuilt biplane
