= Rup =

Rup or RUP may refer to:

== Acronyms ==
=== Political parties ===
- Raza Unida Party, a former American political party
- Revolutionary Ukrainian Party
- Rural and Urban Political Party, a political party in Solomon Islands

=== Publishers ===
- Rice University Press
- Rockefeller University Press
- Rutgers University Press

=== Other ===
- Rational Unified Process, a software development process framework
- Restricted use pesticide, pesticides not available to the general public in the US
- Rural–urban proportional representation, a proposed voting system developed in Canada

== People ==
- Rup Lal, Indian molecular biologist
- Rupinder Rup Magon, Indian-Canadian musician

== Other uses ==
- Rup dialects of the Bulgarian language
- rup, ISO 639-2 and 639-3 codes for the Aromanian language, spoken in Southeastern Europe
- RUP, IATA airport code for Rupsi Airport, near Dhubi, Assam, India

== See also ==
- RUPA (disambiguation)
