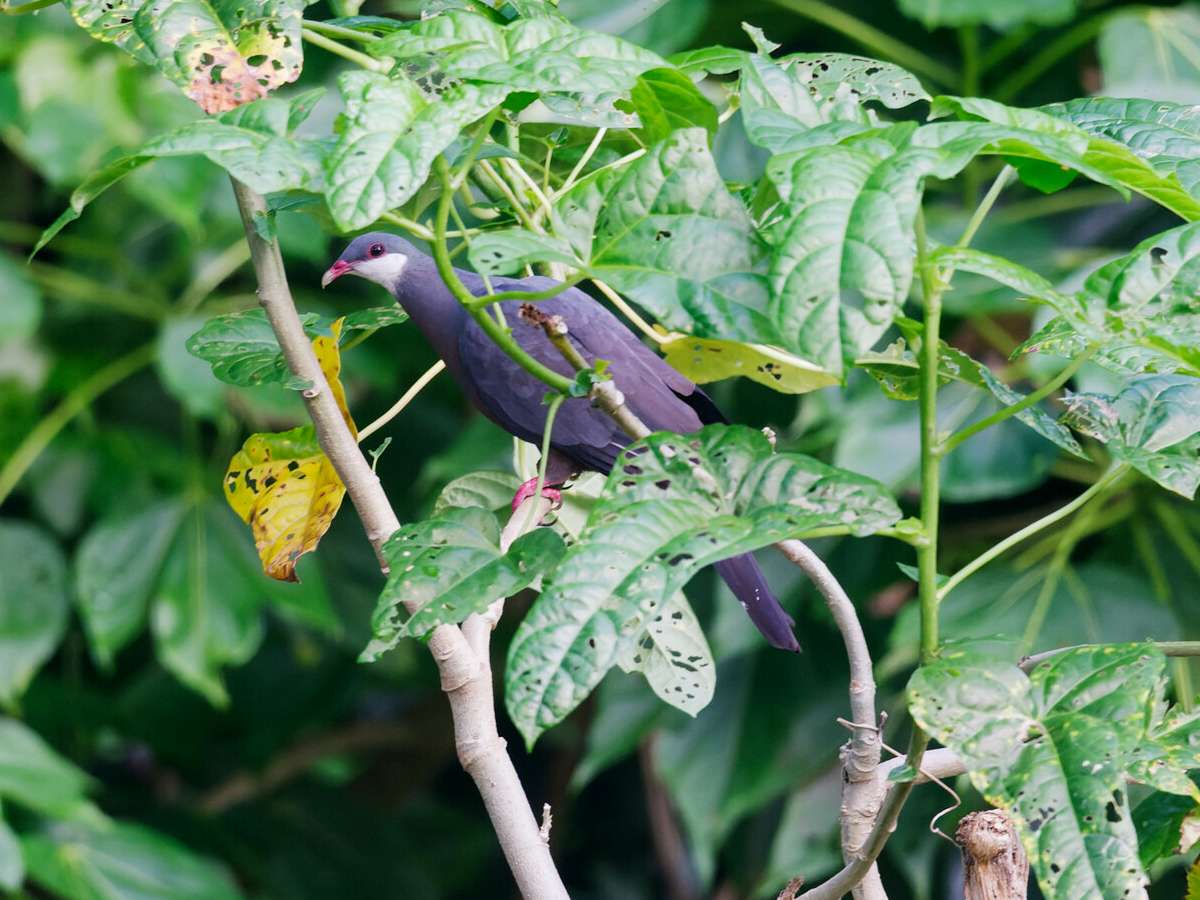
- Columba vitiensis vitiensis, Fiji

Conservation status
- Least Concern (IUCN 3.1)

Scientific classification
- Kingdom: Animalia
- Phylum: Chordata
- Class: Aves
- Order: Columbiformes
- Family: Columbidae
- Genus: Columba
- Species: C. vitiensis

Binomial name
- Columba vitiensis Quoy & Gaimard, 1832

Subspecies
- 9 (See text)
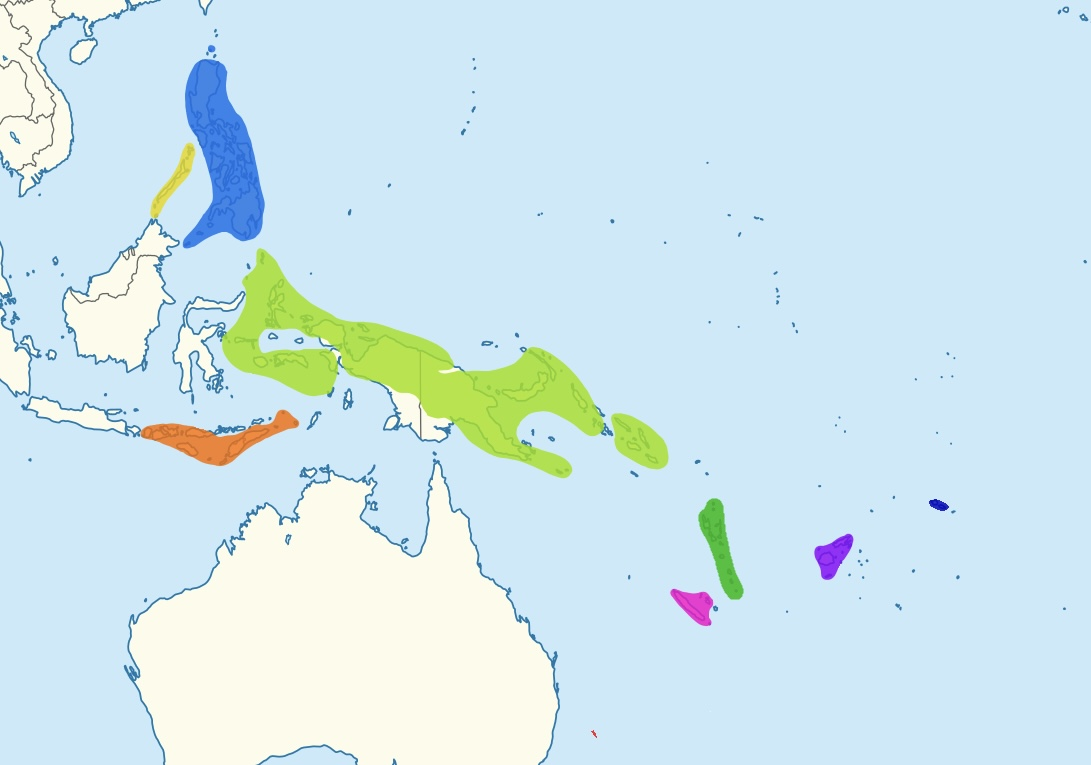
- C. v. anthracina C. v. griseogularis C. v. halmaheira Lesser Sundas metallic pigeon Vanuatu metallic pigeon New Caledonia metallic pigeon Lord Howe pigeon (now extinct) Fiji metallic pigeon Samoan metallic pigeon

= Metallic pigeon =

Species of pigeon

The metallic pigeon (Columba vitiensis) also known as white-throated pigeon, is a medium-sized bird up to 37 cm long, in the family Columbidae.

== Subspecies ==
Columba vitiensis forms a chain of eight living and one extinct subspecies that once extended from Japan to Australia:

- C. v. anthracina (Hachisuka, 1939) – endemic to the Palawan and nearby islands (Philippines); last record in 1961
- C. v. castaneiceps Peale, 1848 (Samoan metallic pigeon) – endemic to Samoa. This subspecies is characterized by a purple-chestnut crown that contrasts sharply with the neck and dorsal region. Notably, the ventral plumage remains consistently grey, lacking the rufous terminal fringes typically observed in other subspecies, even when the feathers are worn.
- C. v. godmanae Mathews, 1915 (Lord Howe pigeon) – formerly endemic to Lord Howe Island (Australia); extinct in approximately 1853. Its existence is known only from early accounts and a painting by Raper, which likely portrays this bird.
- C. v. griseogularis (Walden & E.L.Layard, 1872) – found in the Philippines (except Palawan). It is characterized by having the throat grey in both sexes.
- C. v. halmaheira (Bonaparte, 1855) – found from Taliabu (Indonesia) to the Solomon Islands. This subspecies is the most widespread and has the most iridescent plumage. It is characterized by its large size and highly iridescent, glossy plumage. It features white throat and cheek patches in both sexes, while the scapulars and wing coverts are a sooty black, conspicuously bordered with green and amethyst margins.
- C. v. hypoenochroa (Gould, 1856) (New Caledonia metallic pigeon) – endemic to New Caledonia. This subspecies shows much greater sexual colour dimorphism than others. Males have purple-chestnut underparts glossed with amethyst, while females are much duller.
- C. v. leopoldi (Tristram, 1879) (Vanuatu metallic pigeon) – endemic to Vanuatu. It is similar to C. v. halmaheira but duller, with less conspicuous iridescence. It is characterized by a malar spot and line below the eye, which is reduced or absent in some individuals.
- C. v. metallica Temminck, 1835 (Lesser Sundas metallic pigeon) – found in the Lesser Sunda Islands, where it is rare everywhere except the island of Timor (Indonesia). It is characterized by having the throat grey in both sexes.
- C. v. vitiensis Quoy & Gaimard, 1832 (Fiji metallic pigeon) – endemic to Fiji. It is similar to C. v. leopoldi but smaller and with even duller colour. Its underparts are prevailingly vinaceous or dull chestnut in worn plumage, with grey reduced to the flanks.

== Description ==
The adult has an iridescent purple and green crown, black wing and uppertail coverts, yellowish red iris, yellow bill, red orbital skin, white or grey chin and ear coverts, and purplish feet. It has a dull chestnut or glossed purple green below, depends on subspecies. The nominate form C. v. vitiensis from Fiji has dull underparts, while subspecies C. v. halmaheira has the most iridescent plumage. Both sexes are similar, though females are often duller. The young is duller than adult.

Sexual dimorphism in throat colour is constant in several subspecies; for example, in C. v. vitiensis, males have white throats and cheeks, while females are washed with grey. This difference is noticeable even in juveniles. A pigmented malar spot and line beneath the eye is present in all subspecies except in C. v. castaneiceps.

== Distribution ==
The metallic pigeon is distributed through the islands of Indomalaya, Australasia, and Oceania. It occurs in the Philippines, Indonesia after the Wallace Line (except Sulawesi), Papua New Guinea, the Solomon Islands, Vanuatu, New Caledonia, Fiji, and Samoa. It is also found on several small islands off the northwest coast of Borneo. The species likely reached Vanuatu from New Guinea and from where it spread to other Polynesian islands.

While most subspecies are common within their respective ranges, C. v. halmaheira is considered uncommon on Bougainville and the Bismarck Islands. Similarly, C. v. metallica (Lesser Sundas metallic pigeon) is rare throughout its range, with the exception of Timor. The subspecies C. v. godmanae (Lord Howe pigeon), formerly endemic to Australia's Lord Howe Island, has been extinct since approximately 1853.

== Ecology ==
=== Habitat ===
The species occupies a wide elevational and ecological range, extending from coastal mangroves and sea-level forests to montane forests at altitudes of up to 2,750 meters. While they primarily prefer tropical forests, they exhibit significant habitat adaptability. They are frequently observed in degraded forests and edge habitats, and on smaller islands, they are known to venture close to human settlements.

=== Behaviour and diet ===
Rather than being long-distance migrants, these birds are nomadic, engaging in irregular, local movements between islands in search of food. They are typically found singly or in pairs. Their diet is diverse, consisting mainly of various fruits, grains, seeds, and berries. The average lifespan for this species is approximately 3 to 4 years.

=== Reproduction ===
Their nesting habits are generally consistent with other members of the family Columbidae, with the female typically laying a clutch of one to two eggs per nesting cycle. Although the species is predominantly arboreal, C. v. halmaheira has been recorded nesting on the ground among thick cover. In its bowing display, the bird moves rather slowly and does not erect its tail.

== Gallery ==
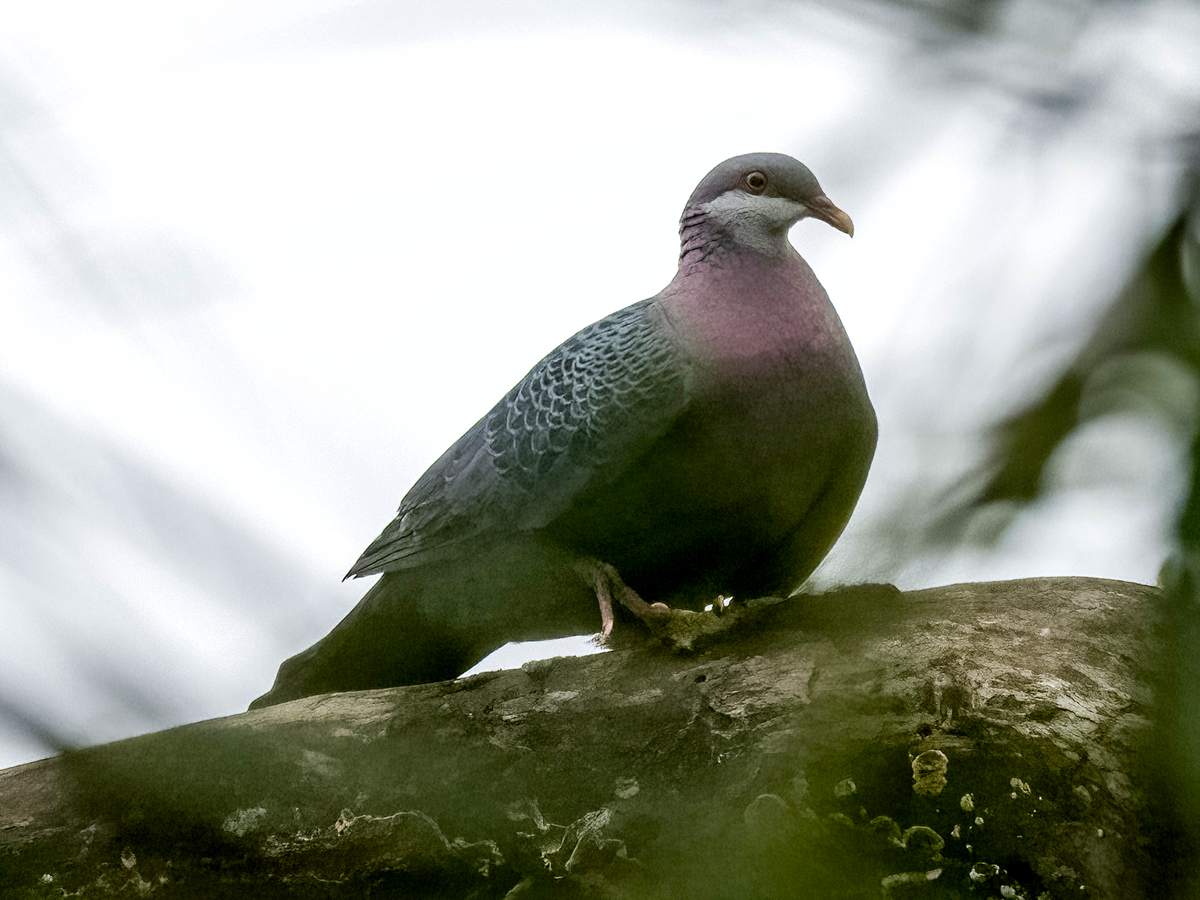
C. vitiensis griseogularis, Panay, Philippines

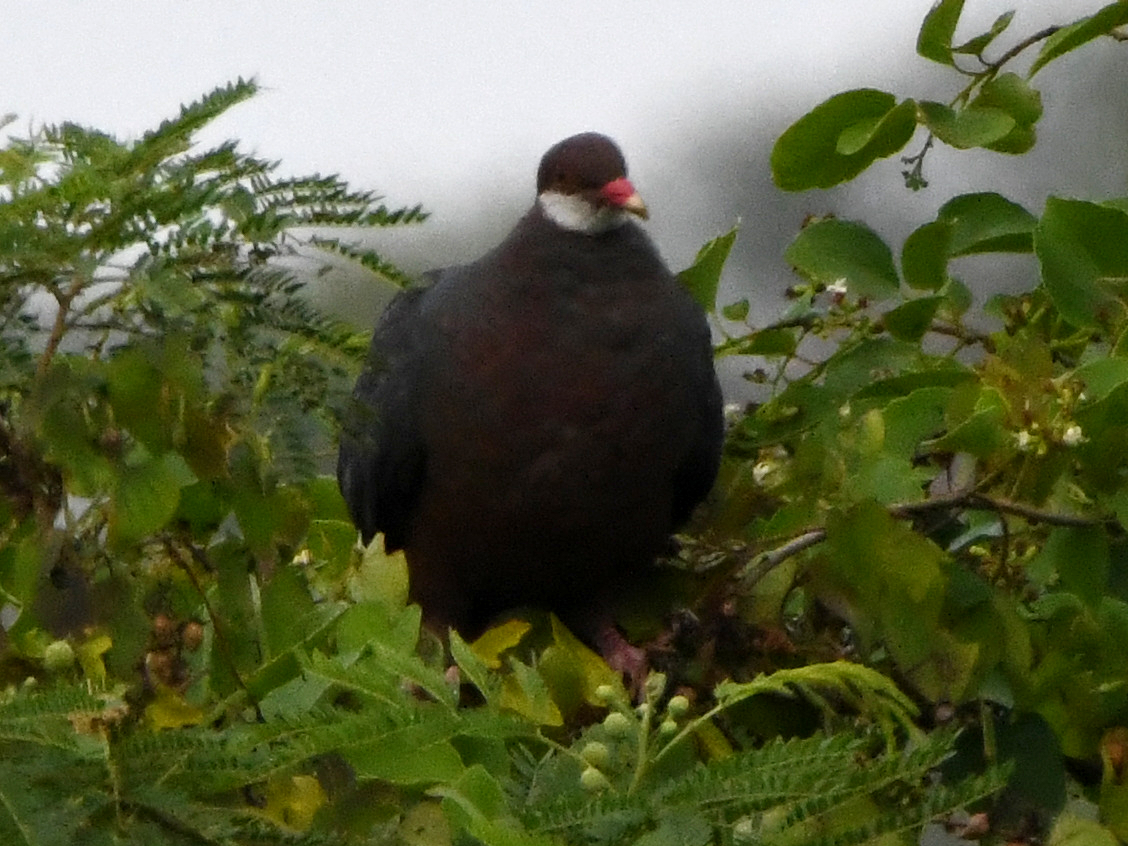
C. vitiensis hypoenochroa, New Caledonia

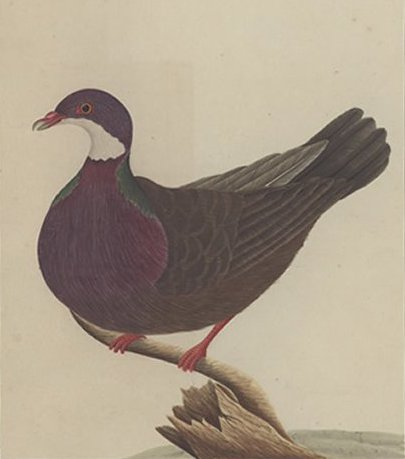
C. vitiensis godmanae

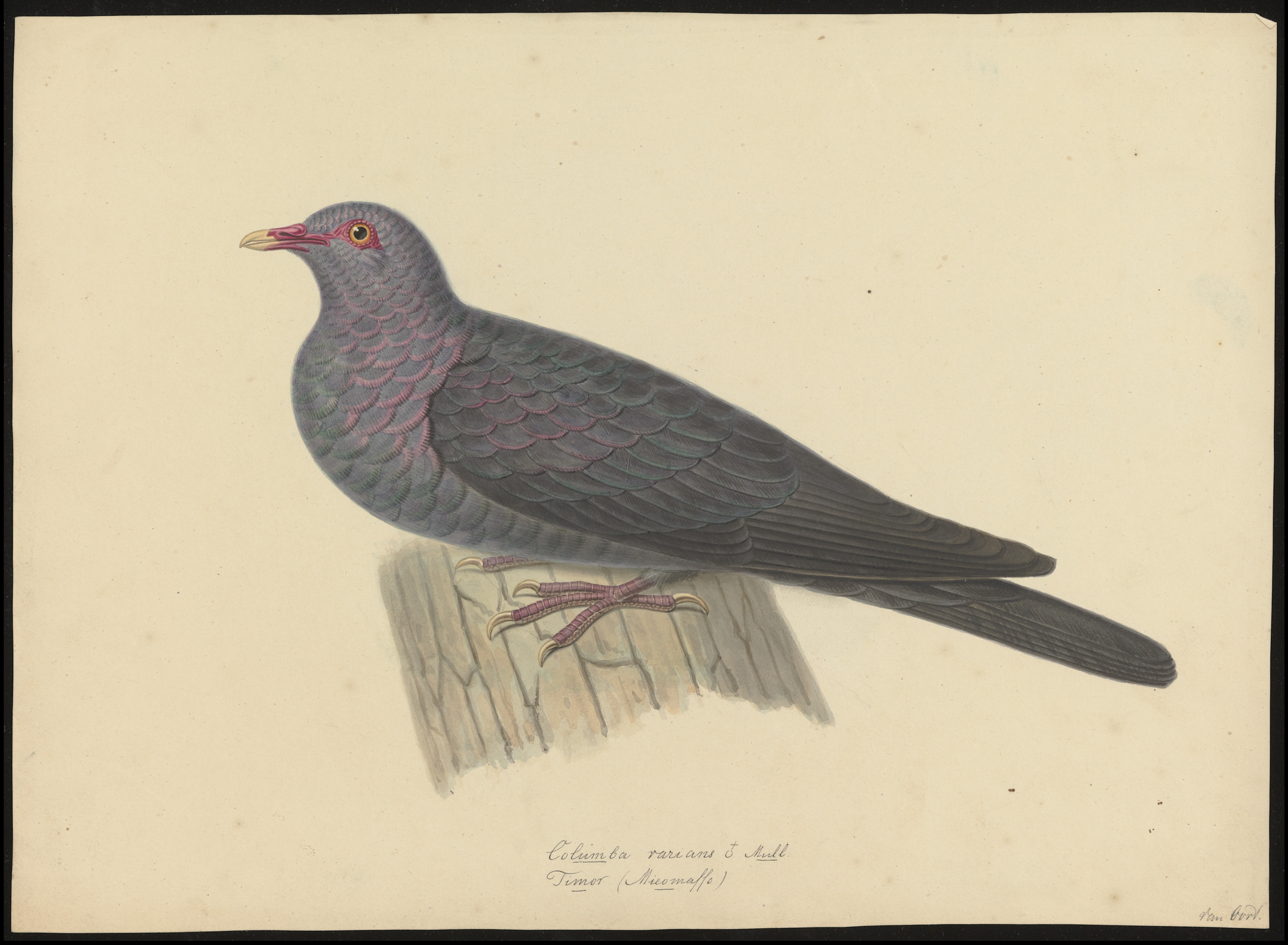
C. vitiensis metallica
