= Edward Rooper =

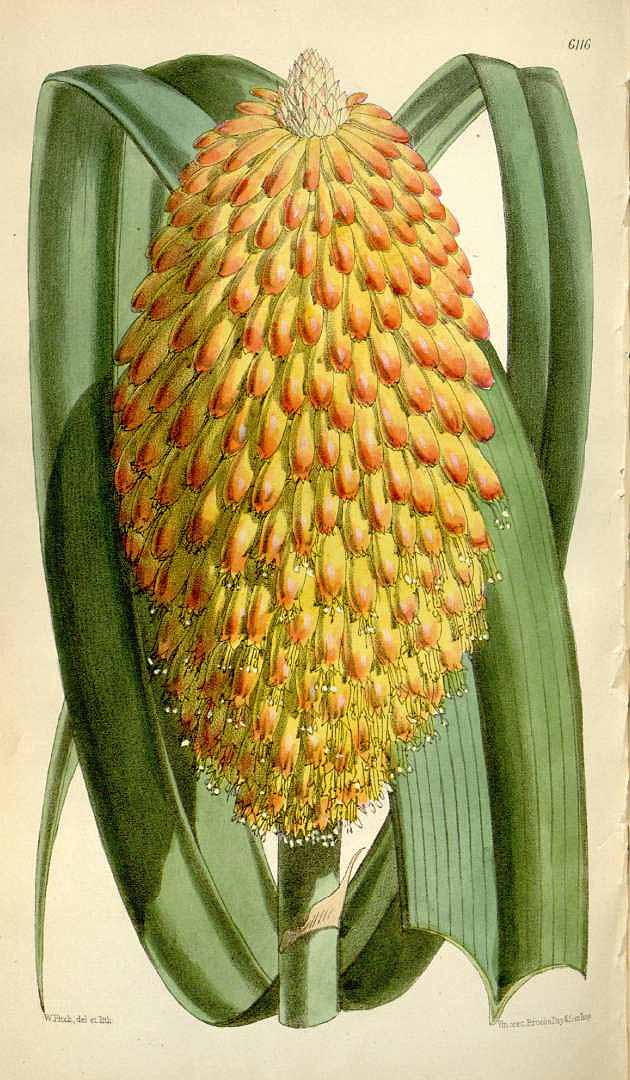
Kniphofia rooperi Walter Hood Fitch (1817-1892)

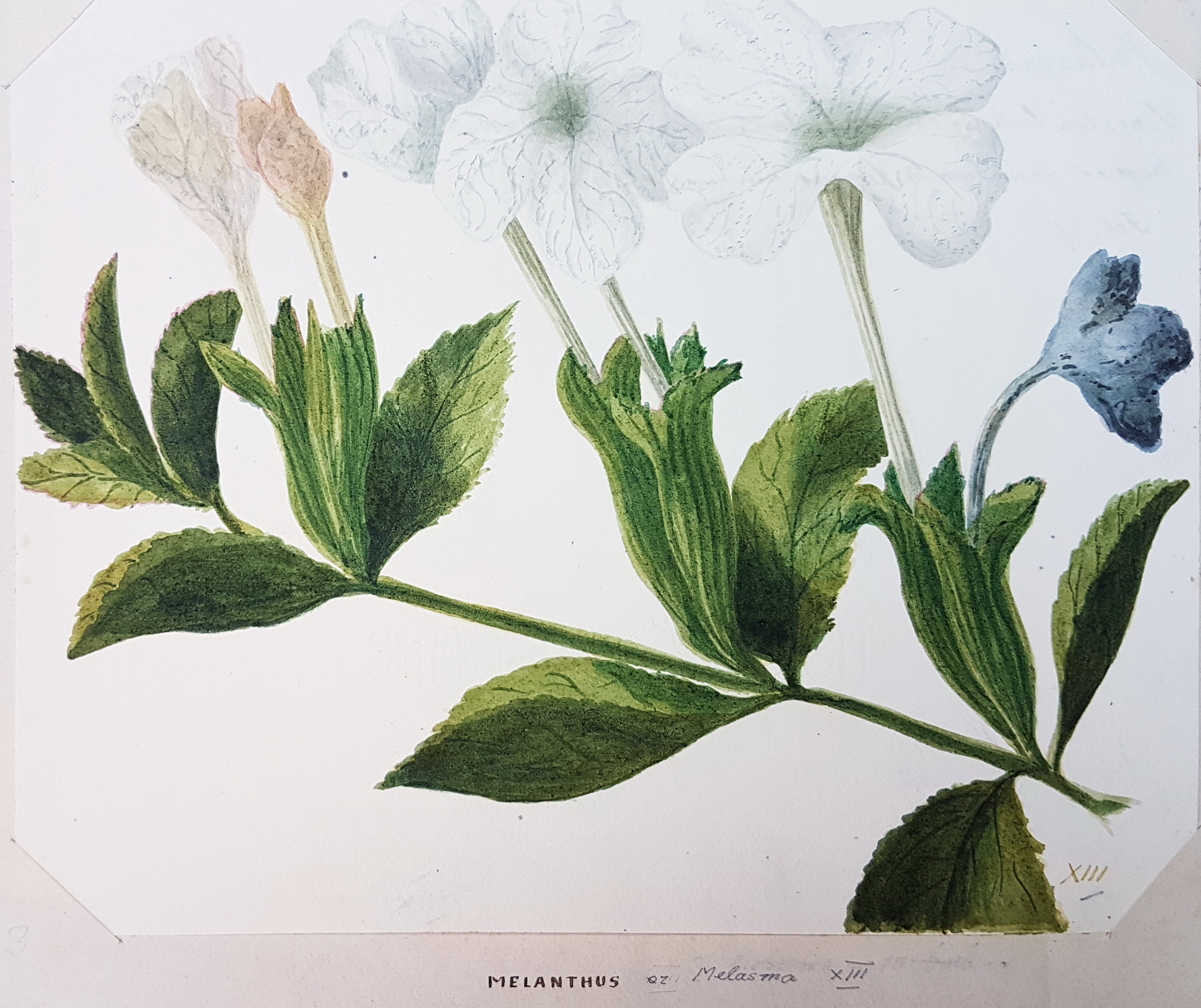
Harveya speciosa Edward Rooper

Edward Rooper (25 January 1818 Wick Hall, Furze Hill, Brighton - 11 or 15 November 1854 Inkerman, Crimea) was an English soldier, landscape painter, and botanical collector and illustrator.

He was the fourth son of the Rev. Thomas Richard Rooper (1782-1865) and Persis Standly (1783-1871), with siblings William Henry Rooper, Marianne Rooper, George Rooper, Henrietta Persis Rooper and John Rooper. He was the grandson of John Rooper of Berkhamsted Castle.

He received a commission as 2nd Lieutenant in the Rifle Brigade on 2 September 1834 and was promoted to Captain on 2 September 1842, and to brevet Major on 26 September 1854. He served in South Africa with the Rifle Brigade after landing at Algoa Bay on 20 November 1846 and was promptly posted to the Kei where he took part in the Seventh Xhosa War, mainly in the Amatola Mountains. At the end of hostilities he was appointed Resident Magistrate of East London on 1 January 1849, a post which he held until June 1850 when he returned to England with his regiment. During this period he had a chance encounter with the explorer and painter, Thomas Baines, inviting him to his headquarters at Fort Glamorgan to see his own paintings which included many botanical illustrations. These paintings came to light in 1956 and were purchased by the Botanical Research Institute of Pretoria as a result of efforts by its librarian, Mary Gunn, following a suggestion by Baines' biographer John Peter Richard Wallis.

On 30 March 1852 he landed once again at Algoa Bay and set off for the Amatolas to take part in the Eighth Xhosa War, returning to England on 12 November 1853. In July 1854 he sailed from England with his Regiment for the Crimea where they arrived 20 September 1854. From a camp near Beicos Bay, the fleet anchorage in the Bosphorus, he wrote a letter to his brother, George Rooper of Lincoln’s Inn:

Dear George

There is no doubt of the melancholy fact that we have got to go and take Sebastobol [sic] and considering they have 90,000 and we 50,000 I fear the operation will not be over easy. I much fear the Authorities are driven in to the attempt by the attacks made on them by the Press, in fact the ravages of the Cholera have been fearful not so much in loss of life, though there has been enough of that, as in the weak state the slightest attacks of it reduce the men to. The Duke of Cambridge says the Army at Varna is almost annihilated for the present and that we look healthier and better than any Regt there. At the same time we had about 12 per Cent sick. Our loss to now is twenty two. Our doctors have not shone in the matter much only now adopting the measures found efficacious by now experienced men. We expect to go every day as they say the Expedition is to sail on the 2nd from Varna.

Even for a pleasanter place than the Crimea is likely to be at present I should be sorry to leave this beautiful view of the Bospheros which we command up and down from our lofty Camp. I have laid on a fresh Servant too and speak Romain to any amount. I was just beginning to inquire about the shooting of which I think we should get some good if we remained here. It is pleasant to know the quail are just coming in. I have not been very often to Stamboul but enjoy the place the more the better I know it.

Of course you will go to the Turkish Bazaar Show in London – as they are not loquacious or energetic it must be almost as good as the real live article – I rather singularly met the other day Hussey Pasha whose acquaintance I made at Yannina years ago. He was very civil to me but I did not remember him until we parted when I heard his name. I have written to B. to say they must not expect to hear regularly now but repeat the warning when you write If any accident happens to me and I expect there will be a few casualties I wish you and John to divide anything I may have I owe nothing to anyone hoping to date my next however safely from Sebastobol...

Yours ever E.R.

Edward was wounded at the Battle of Inkerman on 5 November 1854 and died on 11 or 15 November aboard the troop transport ship Golden Fleece on its way to the hospital at Scutari.

On occasion Edward sent seed and bulbs from South Africa to his father in Brighton, who in turn forwarded interesting items to William Jackson Hooker at Kew and Thomas Moore at the Chelsea Botanic Garden. Consequently it is Rev. Thomas Richard Rooper who was commemorated in Hypoxis rooperi T.Moore, and Kniphofia rooperi (T.Moore) Lem. Memorials to both father and son are to be found on the north wall of St Andrews Church in Hove.
