= Rupa (name) =

Rupa (sometimes spelled Roopa) is a given name, current in the Indian Sub-Continent. Notable people with this name include:

== Females ==
- Rupa Bhawani (1620–1720), Kashmiri poet
- Roopa Ganguly (born 1963), Indian actress
- Rupa Bajwa (born 1976), Indian writer
- Rupa Saini (born 1954), Indian field hockey player
- Rupa Biswas (born 1955), Indian singer
- Rupa So.Si. Chaudhari, Nepalese politician
- Rupa Huq (born 1972), British politician, columnist, and academic
- Rupa Marya (born 1975), Indian-American doctor, activist, writer, and singer
- Rupa Manjari (born 1990), Indian actress

== Males ==
- Rupa Goswami (1489–1564), Indian philosopher
- Rupa Karunathilake (1933–2011), Sri Lankan politician
