= John Peter Richard Wallis =

John Peter Richard Wallis

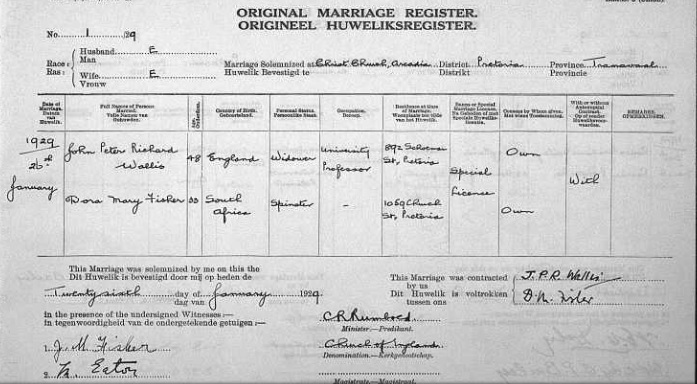

John Peter Richard Wallis OBE MA (10 May 1880 Liverpool - 18 September 1957 Finchingfield, Essex) was a British-born South African biographer and historian. He was the child of John and Hannah Wallis of Meliden Road, Fairfield, Liverpool. His father is noted as being a joiner in John Peter Richard Wallis's baptism record of 1 August 1880 at All Saints Church, Old Swan, Lancs.

Wallis married Mable Margaret Pugmire in Fairfield St John the Divine, Edge Hill, Lancashire, England on 29 July 1908 and had 2 children with her John Macintyre Wallis and Joyce Wallis. He served in the military 1899-1904 and then again in 1915-1916.

Wallis was appointed as professor of English language and literature at the University of Pretoria in 1917, a post he held until 1943. During this period he was also Dean of the Faculty of Art for five years. In 1943 he was asked by the Southern Rhodesian government to put in order their historical archives in Salisbury. In May 1956 he was awarded an OBE "for public services to the Federation of Rhodesia and Nyasaland, especially in the editing of documents published by the Central African Archives."

Wallis was married to Dora Mary Fisher, a 33-year-old spinster, on 26 January 1929 at Christ Church, Arcadia in Pretoria by the Dean of the Church of England in Pretoria, the Very Rev. C.R. Rumbold. Wallis was recorded as being a widower living at 892 Schoeman St, Pretoria.

He retired to England in 1950 and died in Finchingfield in Essex in September 1957.

== Works ==
- The Prophetic Writings of William Blake / edited by D.J. Sloss and J.P.R. Wallis, 1926
- Engelse kortverhale - Jacques Dusseau & Co., Cape Town, 1932
- Fortune my foe: the story of Charles John Andersson, African explorer (1827-1867) - Jonathan Cape, 1936
- Thomas Baines: Explorer And Artist 1820-1875 - Jonathan Cape, 1941
- Thomas Baines: His Life And Explorations In South Africa, Rhodesia and Australia 1820-1875 - Jonathan Cape, 1942
- The Matabele journals of Robert Moffat, 1829-1860 - Chatto & Windus, 1945
- The Northern Goldfields Diaries of Thomas Baines (3 vols) - Chatto & Windus, 1946
- One Man's Hand: The Story of Sir Charles Coghlin and the Liberation of Southern Rhodesia - Longmans, Green and Co., 1950
- The Zambesi Journal of James Stewart, 1862-1863. : With a selection from his correspondence / edited by J. P. R. Wallis, 1952
- The Barotseland Journal of James Stevenson-Hamilton, 1898-1899 - Chatto & Windus, 1953
- The Southern African diaries of Thomas Leask, 1865-1870 - Chatto & Windus, 1954
- Fitz: The Story of Sir Percy FitzPatrick - Macmillan & Co Ltd., 1955
- The Zambesi expedition of David Livingstone 1858-1863 / ed. by J. P. R. Wallis, 1956
- The Matabele Mission: A Selection from the Correspondence of John and Emily Moffat, David Livingstone and Others, 1858-1878 - Chatto & Windus, 1981
