= Cape Raper =

Peninsula in Nunavut, Canada

Coordinates: 69.734°N 67.096°W

Cape Raper is a peninsula on eastern Baffin Island, Qikiqtaaluk Region, Nunavut, Canada. Difficult to identify from seaward, Cape Raper is about 38 miles (61 km) north-northwestward from Henry Kater Peninsula.
