= Cardy Raper =

American mycologist and science writer (1925–2019)

- Born: January 9, 1925
- Died: September 5, 2019 (aged 94)
- Education: University of Chicago; University of Vermont
- Spouse: Red Raper
- Scientific career
- Workplaces: Harvard University Wellesley College University of Vermont
- Academic advisors: Red Raper

Carlene Allen "Cardy" Raper (January 9, 1925 – September 5, 2019) was an American mycologist and science writer. She identified that the fungus Schizophyllum commune has over 23,000 mating types. She is regarded as one of the first women taxonomists in mycology. She was a Fellow of the American Association for the Advancement of Science.

== Early life and education ==
Raper was born in Plattsburgh, NY, the youngest of six; as her mother stated, "I had to go through five miserable boys to get a girl." Her brothers doted on her and she grew up a tomboy; sports and outdoor activities were to be a big part of her life. The family placed a high value on education, and Raper wanted to be a scientist from the age of eight. She earned a master's degree in science at the University of Chicago in 1946, working on reproduction in the fungi Achlya and Schizophyllum commune. She married her college supervisor at Chicago, John (Red) Raper, in 1949 and earned her PhD in 1977.

== Career ==
After earning her masters, Raper continued working alongside her husband, Red Raper, on the mating-type mutants of Schizophyllum. The couple soon moved to Harvard University, where Red became chair of the biology department at Harvard University. The couple had two children, Jonathan in 1952 and Linda Carlene in 1954. Red died unexpectedly in 1974, and Cardy continued at Harvard as a researcher and lecturer while working towards her PhD. She also spent one year in the Netherlands at the University of Hagen working with Jos Wessels. In 1978 she joined Wellesley College as an assistant professor. After spending the summer of 1982 working with Bob Ullrich at the University of Vermont in Burlington, she decided to move there. In 1983 she set up her own independent research laboratory at the University of Vermont, where she remained until her retirement in 1994, and then for several more years as an emeritus professor.

As the field of microbiology expanded rapidly during the 1980s and 90s, Raper learned new techniques and dived deeper into the reproductive life of the Schizophyllum commune fungus. She and Red Raper had shown that Schizo has more than 23,000 mating types. Now she shifted to an in-depth study of the chemistry and mechanisms of pheromonal signaling between the types. Her work contributed not only to the study of fungi, but to the understanding of pheromonal signaling in general. She authored numerous papers and mentored dozens of graduate students. In 2008 she was honored with a celebration of her contributions to science. In 2012 she was elected as a Fellow of the American Association for the Advancement of Science.

== Personal life ==
Raper remained active after retirement, authoring a memoir about her career as a scientist and another about her husband's family. She continued her love of sports (skiing, tennis, sailing), learned to paraglide, and traveled frequently around the globe, visiting her extensive network of scientific friends and former students. Her son, Jonathan Raper, became a professor of cell biology at the University of Pennsylvania. Her daughter Linda Raper, better known as Carlene, became a noted fabric artist. Cardy Raper died after a brief illness at her summer home in Vergennes, Vermont on the shores of her beloved Lake Champlain, on September 5, 2019 at the age of 94.

=== Books ===
- A Woman of Science: An Extraordinary Journey of Love, Discovery, and the Sex Life of Mushrooms. 2013.
- An American Harvest: How One Family Moved From Dirt-Poor Farming To A Better Life In The Early 1900s. 2016.
