= MV Maersk Rapier =

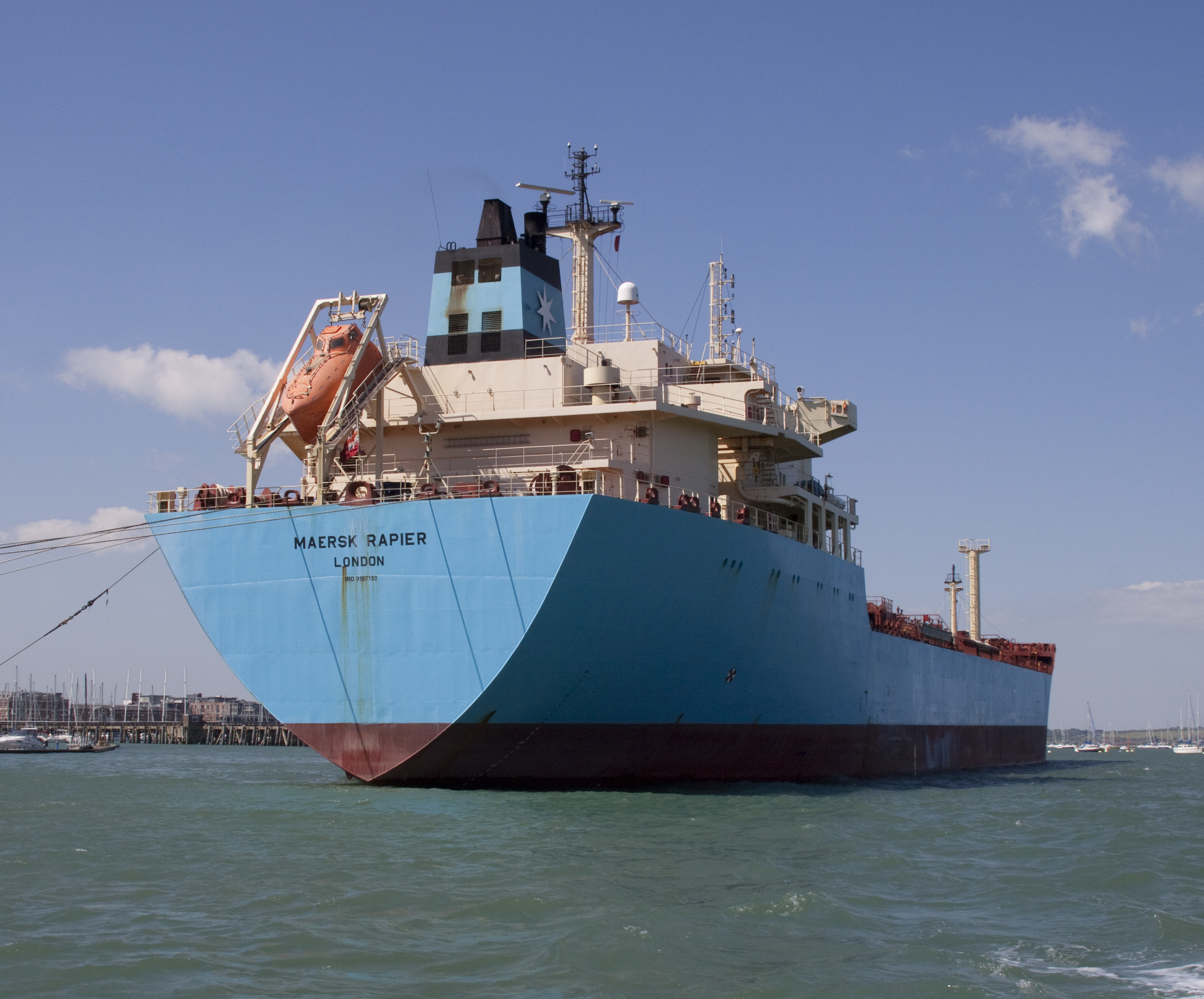
- MV Maersk Rapier

History
- Name: Maersk Rapier
- Owner: A.P. Moller–Maersk Group
- Port of registry: London
- Builder: Guangzhou Shipyard International, China
- Launched: 2000
- Decommissioned: June 2017
- In service: 2003 (under MOD charter)
- Identification: IMO number: 9167150; MMSI number: 233816000; Callsign: MZFR9
- Fate: Sold, became Dolcha Bay
- Status: Retired

General characteristics
- Class & type: Commercial Tanker
- Tonnage: 35,000 DWT
- Length: 171.2m
- Beam: 27.42m
- Speed: 15.5kts

MV Maersk Rapier is a commercial product tanker that was owned by the A.P. Moller–Maersk Group and chartered to the United Kingdom's Ministry of Defence (MoD). The vessel served as the primary strategic link for the collection and transportation of purchased fuel from oil refineries to British and NATO fuel depots.

== MoD charter ==
Maersk Rapier is tasked with supplying fuel to the United Kingdom's various naval establishments at home and overseas. The vessel operates principally in the British, Atlantic and Mediterranean regions and provides aviation fuel to various RAF stations, including RAF Akrotiri in Cyprus, the airbridge connection at Ascension Island and Mount Pleasant in the Falklands. The MoD sub-charters the vessel (known as 3rd party trading) to commercial companies during rare periods where she is not in use for defence purposes.

The operations at the Falklands and Ascension required the use of specialist floating hoses. At the Falklands the fuel was discharged through an SBM at Mare Harbour. The vessel also regularly served the NATO fueling station at Loch Striven and occasionally the fuel jetties at Garelochhead, Gosport and Plymouth. The vessel primarily carried a combination of Aviation Fuel for the Royal Air Force and high grade Diesel for the Royal Navy.

The Maersk Rapier was under permanent charter with the MoD since 2003. The commercial contract to carry fuel for the MoD has also been extended to other Maersk vessels in the past. From 1982 to 2003 the vessels Maersk Ascension and Maersk Gannet were also under permanent charter to the MoD.

As of June 2017, the vessel has been sold to an unnamed party for $6.5m.

She was renamed Dolcha Bay.

== See also ==
- Merchant Navy (United Kingdom)
- Royal Fleet Auxiliary
