= Henry Raper (Royal Navy officer) =

British Royal Navy admiral

Admiral Henry Raper
- Born: 1767
- Died: 5 April 1845 (aged 77–78); London
- Occupation: Royal Navy admiral

Henry Raper (1767 – 5 April 1845) was a British Royal Navy admiral.

== Biography ==
Raper was born in 1767, entered the navy in February 1780, on board the Berwick, which in July joined the flag of Sir George Rodney in the West Indies. Returning in 1781, he took part in the battle on the Doggerbank on 5 Aug. Raper afterwards served in the Cambridge, and in her was at the relief of Gibraltar by Lord Howe in October 1782. He then joined the Marquis de Seignelay, with Commander John Hunter, his former shipmate in the Berwick, and remained in her till 1785. From 1785 to 1788 he was in the Salisbury, the flagship of Rear-admiral John Elliot, at Newfoundland, and afterwards in the Impregnable and Queen Charlotte in the Channel till 22 November 1790, when he was promoted to the rank of lieutenant. Through 1791 he served in the Vesuvius bomb, and in October 1793 was appointed to the Queen Charlotte, flagship of Earl Howe, to whom he acted as signal lieutenant in May and on 1 June 1794. On 4 July he was promoted to be commander, and in September, on the recommendation of Howe, was appointed signal officer on the staff of Vice-admiral de Valle, of the Portuguese squadron acting in conjunction with Howe. On resigning this post in December, he was presented with a diamond-hilted sword. In November 1795 he commanded the Racoon in the Thames; and on 1 February 1796 was posted to the Champion, a small frigate employed on the coast of Ireland and afterwards in the North Sea. In January 1798 he assisted in the seizure of a Swedish convoy, which was brought into the Downs (Schomberg, Naval Chronology, iii. 264); and in the following May took part in the attempt to destroy the locks and sluice-gates of the Bruges-Ostend Canal.p

From January 1799 to September 1802 he commanded the Aimable in the West Indies (James, Nav. Hist. ii. 416). In 1810 he declined an offer of the rank of vice-admiral in the Portuguese service; and was in November appointed to the Mars, which he commanded till February 1813, on the Lisbon station and in the Baltic. Notwithstanding repeated applications he had no further employment; but was promoted in due course to be rear-admiral on 12 August 1819, vice-admiral on 22 July 1830, and admiral on 23 November 1841. He died in London on 5 April 1845, aged 78 (Gent. Mag.) He was the author of ‘A New System of Signals, by which Colours may be wholly dispensed with,’ 1828, 4to. He married, in 1798, Miss Craig, by whom he left issue. His eldest son, Henry, is separately noticed.
