= Roper =

Roper is a craftsman who makes ropes; a ropemaker.

It may also refer to:

== Places ==
- Roper, North Carolina, USA
- Roper River, Northern Territory, Australia

== People ==
- Roper (surname)

== Other ==
- Roper v. Simmons, a decision of the United States Supreme Court
- Roper resonance, an unstable subatomic particle
- Roper Technologies, American industrial company
- Roper-Logan-Tierney model of nursing
- USS Roper (DD-147), an American navy ship
- Roper, a style of cowboy boot with a short heel and round toe
- Ropers, mascots of the Will Rogers High School
- Roper, a Whirlpool Corporation brand of household appliances
- Roper (band), an American Christian pop-punk band
- The Ropers, an American sitcom
- Roper (Dungeons & Dragons), a magical beast in a fantasy role playing game
- Roper Center for Public Opinion Research

== See also ==
- Roeper (disambiguation)
