= Catherine Charlotte Raper =

English pastellist (1766–1809)

- Born: London, England
- Baptised: 16 May 1766
- Died: 1809; Lewisham, London, England
- Occupation: pastellist
- Children: 11
- Relatives: George Raper (brother)
- Awards: Greater Silver Pallet Award

Catherine Charlotte Raper (c. 1766–1809) was an English pastellist. She received the Greater Silver Pallet Award from the Society of Arts for one of her works.

== Family ==
Raper was almost certainly the daughter of Henry and Catherine Raper (née Shepperd) who was baptized on 16 May 1766 in the church of St Andrew Holborn in London. Her brother was the Royal Navy officer and natural history illustrator George Raper, who sailed as part of the "first fleet" to Australia in May 1787.

== Career ==
In 1789, whilst living in Cheyne Row, Chelsea, London, Raper received the Greater Silver Pallet Award from the Society of Arts for one of her pastel paintings.

== Personal life ==
On 16 December 1789, in Calcutta, Bengal, Raper married a soldier in the service of the East India Company, Major James Edward Browne. They had one son, before her husband died at Dinapore on 22 June 22 1792.

In 1794, still in Calcutta, Raper married again, this time to Lieutenant Charles Fraser. The couple had ten children, three of whom were born after the couple returned to Great Britain (before 1806).

Raper died in Lewisham, London, in 1809.
