= John R. Raper =

American mycologist (1911–1974)

John Robert "Red" Raper
- Born: 1911; Davidson County, North Carolina, U.S.
- Died: 1974 (aged 62–63)
- Occupation: Mycologist

John Robert "Red" Raper (1911–1974) was an American mycologist who studied genetic control of sexuality in fungi, mating type compatibility, fungal genetics, and taught at Harvard University among other places.

== Biography ==
John Robert Raper was born October 3, 1911, to William Franklin and Julia Salina (Crouse) Raper on a tobacco farm in Davidson County, just outside Winston-Salem, North Carolina. He was the youngest of 8 children. He was called "Red" because of his hair color. His brother Kenneth was also a mycologist. Beyond mycology and genetics, Red loved music and was an avid trumpet player. He contributed to the Moravian community brass choirs around his childhood home and later to the North Carolina Symphony. He was noted for his talent as a photographer and artist, regularly illustrating his own and others scientific publications.

Raper graduated in 1933 from the University of North Carolina at Chapel Hill with an A.B. in Botany. In 1936 he got an M.A., his thesis done under supervision of William Chambers Coker and John Nathaniel Couch, and titled "Heterothallism and sterility in Achlya and observations on the cytology of Achlya bisexualis". In 1939 Raper got M.A. and a Ph.D. at Harvard University working with William H. Weston, then moved to the California Institute of Technology as a postdoc to work with A. J. Haagen-Smit.

In 1936 Raper married Ruth Scholz. They had a son, William, and divorced in 1948. Later, he married Carlene Marie; they had two children, Jonathan and Linda Carlene. He died in Cambridge, Massachusetts, in 1974.

== Scientific interests ==
Raper was a pioneer in the study of fungal sexual genetics. He studied mating systems in filamentous heterotrophs, beginning with the aquatic genus Achlya. Once thought to be fungi because of their filamentous growth form and nutritional habits, Achlya and other water molds are now known to belong to the Kingdom Chromalveolata. Red and Carlene (Cardy), later studied the genetic control of sexual reproduction in the gilled mushroom Schizophyllum commune. Red realized early on there were fungi that differed in aspects of compatibility and attributed these to what he called incompatibility factors A and B, further differentiating α and β in each. Some fungi have two mating types, termed bipolar, and others including some Red worked on, have thousands of mating types due to a more complicated mating type determination system. These two extreme strategies are thought to be involved with manipulating the chance of out versus self-crossing as evolutionary strategies. He and Cardy studied the events preceding karyogamy, including the transition from monokaryotic to dikaryotic. Much of Red’s work has spawned many research questions about sex in fungi addressed more recently using model organisms like Saccharomyces cerevisiae, Cryptococcus gattii, and Candida albicans. His research laid the foundation for the current knowledge body about somatic and sexual compatibility in fungi. Through the influence of Red's work, it is now understood that mating-type identity is determined by regions of the genome called mating type or MAT loci. These loci contain protein-coding regions for G protein-coupled receptors that sense ligands with varying specificity and signal through Mitogen-activated protein kinase cascades, as well as peptide pheromones and transcription factors involved in mate sensation, selection and reproduction.

== Scientific history ==
Raper's interests in fungi began as an undergraduate. He was heavily influenced by his interactions as a Masters student working with mycologist John Crouch at the University of North Carolina at Chapel Hill. He then undertook graduate studies with William ‘Cap’ Weston at Harvard, resulting in his PhD in 1939. After Harvard Red left to study plant biology with John Bonner at the California Institute of Technology. The collaboration didn’t work out and he ended up studying what he called ‘hormone A’ from Achlya with Dr. A. J. Haagen-Smit. His first brief professor appointment at Indiana University was interrupted by his call to the Manhattan Project at Oak Ridge National Laboratory in Tennessee where he pioneered studies on the effects of Beta rays on rats. After working at Oak Ridge he took a position at the University of Chicago where he resumed efforts to determine the numbers and distributions of mating types from globally distributed fungi. One focus of his work was Schizophyllum commune. He returned to Harvard in 1954 where he chaired the Department of Biological Sciences and continued his research and mentorship of graduate students.

== Awards & distinctions ==
- Secretary, 1939, American Academy of Arts and Sciences
- President, 1956, Mycological Society of America
- Guggenheim Fellow, 1960, Cologne, Germany
- Fulbright Scholar, 1960, Cologne, Germany
- Visiting Professor in Genetics, 1967, Hebrew University
- Award of Merit, 1969, Botanical Society of America
- Chair of the Department of Biological Sciences, Harvard University
- Elected to the National Academy of Sciences, 1964
