= Maurie Raper =

Australian rugby league footballer (died 2026)

Personal information
- Born: 14 October 1944 Revesby, New South Wales, Australia
- Died: 20 February 2026 (aged 81)

Playing information
- Position: Five-eighth
Club
| Years | Team | Pld | T | G | FG | P |
|---|---|---|---|---|---|---|
| 1967–1970 | Penrith | 51 | 10 | 0 | 8 | 46 |
| 1971–1974 | Cronulla-Sutherland | 37 | 5 | 0 | 0 | 15 |
| | Total | 88 | 15 | 0 | 8 | 61 |
- Relatives: Ron Raper (brother); Johnny Raper (brother); Gerard Raper (brother); Peter Raper (brother); Aaron Raper (nephew); Stuart Raper (nephew)

Maurie Raper (14 October 1944 – 20 February 2026) was an Australian professional rugby league footballer who played as a five-eighth in the 1960s and 1970s for Penrith and Cronulla-Sutherland in the NSWRL premiership. Raper was an inaugural player for Penrith and played in the club's first ever game.

== Early life ==
Raper was born into a rugby league family with his older brother Johnny Raper going on to become an immortal of the game and his nephews Aaron Raper and Stuart Raper going on to forge careers with numerous clubs. Raper played his junior rugby league for Canterbury and Western Suburbs before joining newly admitted club Penrith in 1967.

== Playing career ==
Raper played in Penrith's first ever game as a club against Canterbury which ended in a 15–12 defeat. Penrith went on to finish second last in their inaugural season avoiding the wooden spoon which was awarded to fellow new side Cronulla. Raper went on to play with Penrith for a further three seasons with the club struggling towards the bottom of the ladder. At the end of 1970, Raper left Penrith to join Cronulla for the 1971 season. Raper spent four years at Cronulla but missed out on the entire 1973 season due to injury. That year, Cronulla qualified for their first ever grand final which ended in a 10–7 defeat against Manly.

After leaving Cronulla at the end of 1974, Raper went to play in the local Wollongong competition for a few years before retiring.

== Death ==
Raper's death was announced on 22 February 2026.
