= Henry Raper =

Henry Raper (c. 1799 – 6 January 1859) was a British Royal Naval lieutenant who became a nineteenth-century authority on navigation. Amongst his achievements was his quantification of the unreliability of a key longitudinal measurement, lunar distance, when taken at different times. One early beneficiary of Raper's research was Robert FitzRoy, whose second expedition was made famous by the work of his travelling companion, Charles Darwin.

Raper is primarily remembered, however, for his seminal work The Practice of Navigation and Nautical Astronomy, for which he was awarded the Founder's Medal of the Royal Geographical Society in 1841. According to his memorial at St Peter & St Paul's Church, in Dinton, Buckinghamshire, it was "a work universally adopted by the naval service".

Raper died on 6 January 1859 at Torquay in Devon, England.

His father was admiral Henry Raper.

== See also ==
- O'Byrne, William Richard (1849). "Raper, Henry (b)" . A Naval Biographical Dictionary . John Murray – via Wikisource.

== Bibliography ==
- Henry Raper, The Practice of Navigation and Nautical Astronomy (Third edition published by Bate, 1849)
