= Rooper =

Rooper is a surname, and may refer to:

- Edward Rooper (1818–1854), English soldier, landscape painter, botanical collector and illustrator
- Jemima Rooper (born 1981), English actress
- John Bonfoy Rooper (1778–1855), British politician
- William Victor Trevor Rooper (1897–1917), World War I flying ace

== See also ==
- Mount Rooper, Queensland, Australia
