= Roope Nikkilä =

Finnish ice hockey player

- Born: May 2, 1990 (age 34); Tampere, Finland
- Height: 6 ft 0 in (183 cm)
- Weight: 179 lb (81 kg; 12 st 11 lb)
- Position: Forward
- Shoots: Left
- beneleage team Former teams: unis flyers Heerenveen; Ilves; LeKi; Kiekko-Vantaa; KOOVEE; Étoile Noire de Strasbourg
- NHL draft: Undrafted
- Playing career: 2011–present

Roope Nikkilä (born May 2, 1990) is a Finnish professional ice hockey player who is currently playing Scorpions de Mulhouse in the Ligue Magnus in France. He previously played in Liiga for Ilves.
