= Rup Lal =

Indian molecular biologist

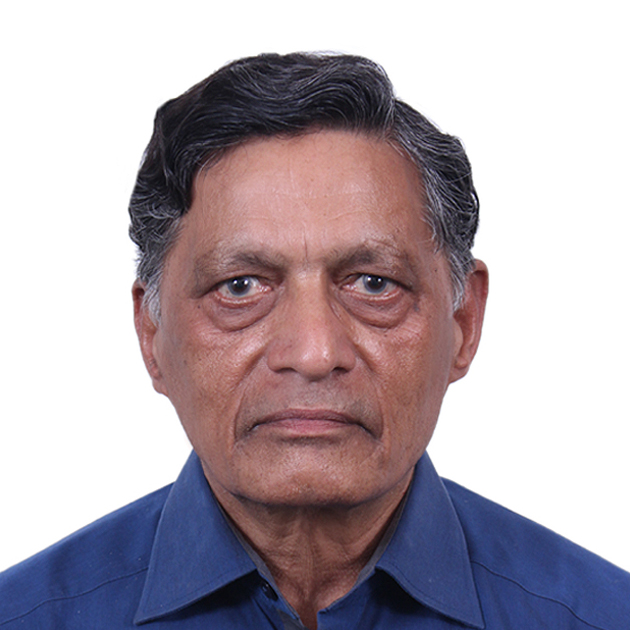

Rup Lal is an Indian molecular biologist known for his work in molecular biology, genomics, metagenomics and taxonomy of microbial diversity inhabiting extreme niches. His research has led to the development of novel analogue of rifamycin, identification and functional characterization of microbial communities at Manikaran hotsprings atop the Himalayan Ranges in Himachal Pradesh, and deciphering the role of microbes in degradation of Hexacholorocyclohexane (HCH) at a polluted dumpsite located at Ummari village, Lucknow, India. He has worked at University of Delhi, India for over 45 years. He was ASM Ambassador for India (2012-2015), presently the ISME and FEMS Ambassador to India and Ambassador to International Microbial Literacy Initiative-South Asia Centre (IMILI-SAC).

He was a visiting scientist at the University of Cambridge, University of Kaiserslautern, Oregon State University, EPFL, University of Lausanne, ETH-EAWAG Zurich, CSIRO- Canberra (Australia) and Helmholtz Centre for Environmental Research Leipzig.

Lal was the Editor-in-Chief of the Indian Journal of Microbiology (2006-2013) and editorial board memberfor the journals mSystems, ISME- Communication, Environmental-Microbiology/Reports, BMC-Biotechnology/Biochemistry, Microbial-Biotechnology, and Indian Journal of Microbiology.

== Fellowships and Awards ==
Lul has been the recipient of several awards and fellowships including:

- Alexander von Humboldt Fellowship
- DBT- Overseas Fellowship
- Indo-US-ASM Professorship in Microbiology
- Australian Government Endeavour Executive Fellowship (2018-2019)
- ASM Moselio Schaechter Distinguished Service Award
- Prof. S.R. Vyas Memorial Award
- Prof. BN Johri Award
- Lifetime Achievement Award from the Association of Microbiologists of India
- Best ISME Ambassador (2022)

Presently, he is a fellow of the National Academy of Sciences, India, the American Academy of Microbiology, the Indian National Science Academy, and the National Academy of Agricultural Sciences.

He has delivered over 350 lectures and over 100 workshops on microbial-diversity, genomics-metagenomics, computational-biology-biotechnology, scientific writing-communication, and microbial literacy and Indian history. Currently, Lal is dedicating most of his time in propagating microbial-literacy by delivering lectures/workshops schools/colleges targeting students/children and colleges under IMILI-SAC.

Presently, he is INSA Senior Scientist at the Acharya Narendra Dev, college, University of Delhi, New Delhi .
