= George Raper =

Royal Navy officer and illustrator (1769–1796)

- Born: 19 September 1769; London, England
- Died: 29 September 1796 (aged 27)
- Military career
- Allegiance: Great Britain
- Branch: Royal Navy
- Service years: 1783–1796
- Rank: Commander
- Commands: HMS Expedition

Commander George Raper (19 September 1769 – 29 September 1796) was a Royal Navy officer and illustrator who as an able seaman joined the crew of HMS Sirius and the First Fleet to establish a colony at Botany Bay. He is best known today for his watercolour sketches of the voyage and settlement, particularly birds and flowers of Sydney Cove.

== Career ==
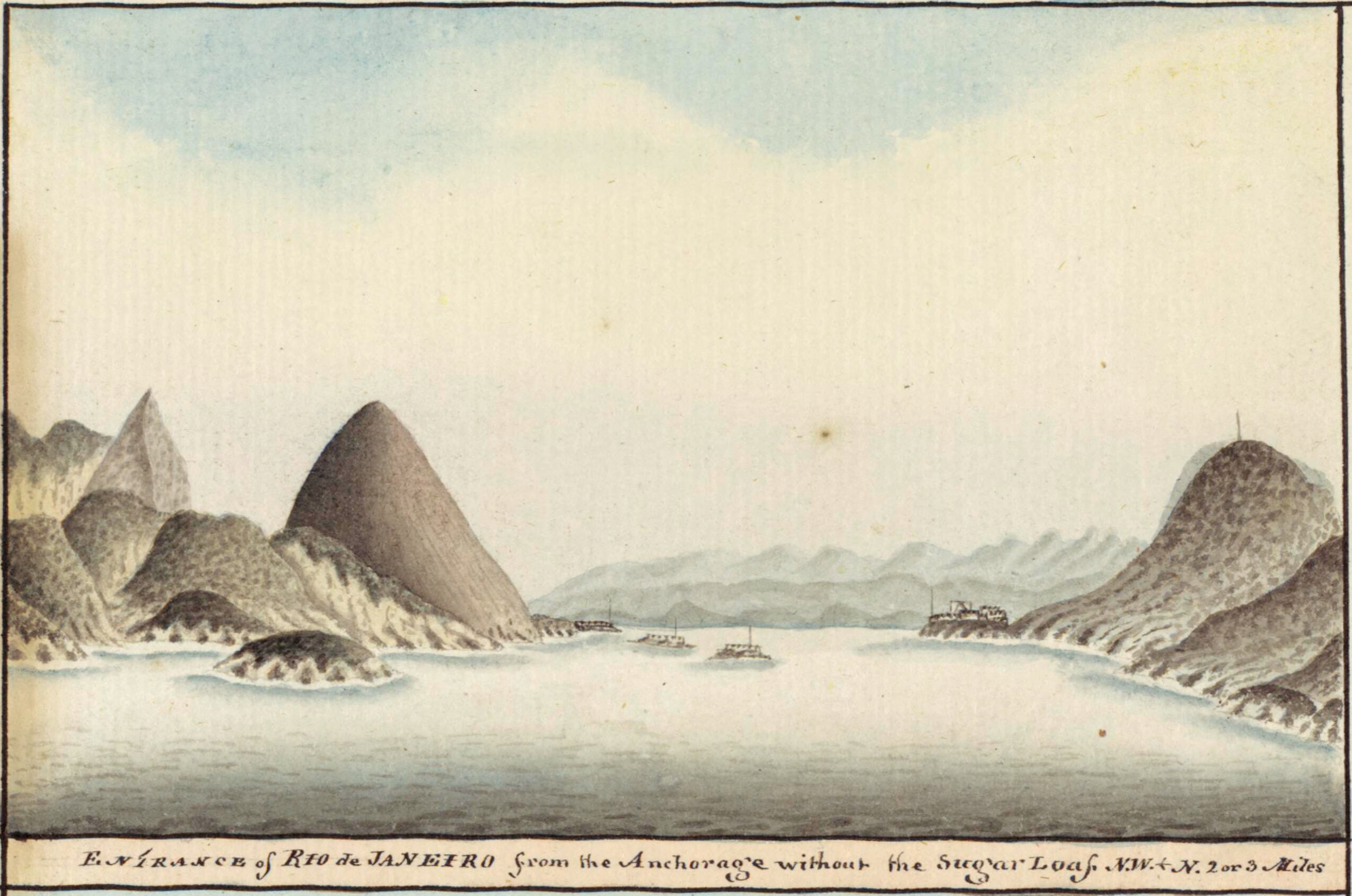
Entrance of Rio de Janeiro from the anchorage without the Sugar Loaf. (Sugarloaf Mountain is left of centre)

Raper was born to Henry and Catherine Raper in London, England on 19 September 1769; his sister was the pastellist Catherine Charlotte Raper. On 20 August 1783 at age 13 he joined the Royal Navy's HMS Rose as a captain's servant. After further service on HMS Racehorse, he joined HMS Sirius on 15 November 1786. Sirius, commanded by Captain John Hunter, was the flagship of the First Fleet, which under Commodore Arthur Phillip transported convicts from England to New South Wales in Australia. On 30 September 1787, while the First Fleet was sailing from Rio de Janeiro to Cape Town, George Raper became a midshipman. Raper took his paint box with him, containing a larger set of paints than that of his captain, John Hunter, who was also an artist. Raper's charts, and his paintings of ports such as Tenerife and Rio de Janeiro, were part of his evidence of competence for his promotion to midshipman. The First Fleet arrived in Botany Bay in January 1788, then sailed to Port Jackson (now Sydney Harbour).

On 1 October 1788, Sirius with Raper on board set sail from Port Jackson for the Dutch settlement of Cape Town, to get supplies for the starving Australian colony. Raper continued to paint; his watercolour of 'ice-islands' on this journey is held at the Natural History Museum, London. In February 1789, Sirius left Cape Town loaded with twelve months' provisions for the ship's company, six months' flour for the whole settlement, and other stores. Raper probably purchased paper in Cape Town; most of his paintings after this date are on Dutch paper.

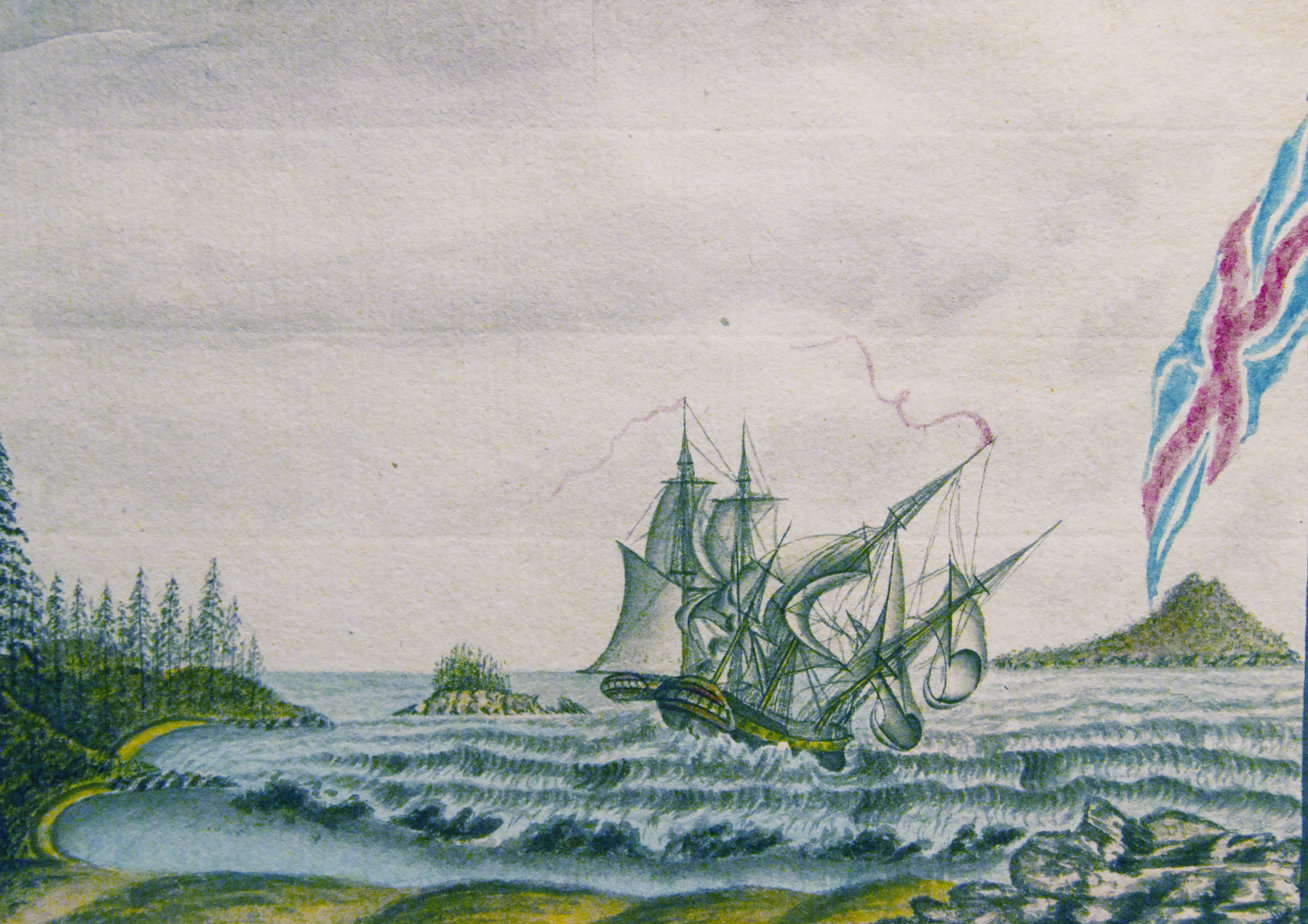
The melancholy loss of HMS Sirius off Norfolk Island, March 19th 1790

On the return to Port Jackson, Sirius suffered damage in a gale off the south coast of Van Diemen's Land. The ship was repaired at Careening Cove, now Mosman Bay on Sydney Harbour, from June to November 1789. During this period, Raper may have had leisure to continue his painting. On 6 March 1790, Sirius, with Raper on board, left Port Jackson for Norfolk Island. On 19 March, Sirius was wrecked while landing supplies at Norfolk Island. All the ship's company were saved and many of the supplies were salvaged; Raper saved his paint box. A number of the landscapes and natural history drawings that he made on the island have survived. He and the crew of Sirius were trapped on the island for 11 months, facing starvation and increasing distress at the failure of Governor Phillip to send a ship to collect them. Raper and the rest of the ship's company eventually returned to Sydney with HMS Supply, arriving there on 27 February 1791.

Raper then returned to England via Batavia (now Jakarta), arriving at Portsmouth in 1792. Back in England, the officers of Sirius, including Raper, faced a court martial because of the loss of the ship. They were honourably acquitted.

Raper then served on HMS Duke and HMS Victory. In June 1793 he received his commission as a lieutenant and moved to HMS Speedy. In September that year he moved to the former French ship Commerce de Marseille, one of the vessels which had defected to the British during the siege of Toulon; his presence is recorded in that ship's muster as 'Rapert ... Lieut't anglais'. Only two illustrations that can be dated to his period of service in the Mediterranean are known to have survived – they are of a dolphin and a shark, and are held at the State Library of New South Wales.

In April 1795 Raper joined HMS Cumberland. While serving on Cumberland, he wrote his will. Dated 14 October 1795, it is a simple document compared to most 18th-century wills. In it he asks that his painting case "be delivered...to my dearest and beloved Mother". In May 1796, Raper was promoted to commander and given his first command, the cutter HMS Expedition. He was despatched to Gibraltar and then the West Indies, bringing his ship through a hurricane near Barbados with much damage but no lives lost.

== Death ==
Different dates for Raper's death have been given; one account stated that Raper died in 1797. Historian Linda Groom, in her book First Fleet artist: George Raper's birds and plants of Australia, cites a letter from Vice-Admiral Sir Hyde Parker, dated 2 October 1796, which reported Raper's death:

"I am sorry to conclude my letter with informing their Lordships that Lieutenant Raper, commanding the Expedition Cutter, died on the 29th".

There are reports of multiple deaths from fever on Royal Navy vessels in the West Indies in the preceding months. The admiral's letter and other naval records of the time, however, make no comment on whether Raper succumbed to the fever or died from some other cause.

== Paintings ==
On his travels from 1787 to 1792 George Raper made watercolour paintings of birds, flowers and landscapes. Many of these drawings show species which are extinct today, like the Lord Howe swamphen or the Lord Howe pigeon from Lord Howe Island. He also sketched profiles of landscapes and topographical maps.

Currently Raper's paintings are collected in five places:

- The First Fleet Artwork Collection in the Natural History Museum in London, of 72 Raper paintings. Previously acquired by Osbert Salvin and Frederick DuCane Godman, these were exhibited to the Zoological Society of London in 1877. Godman's daughter Eva Godman donated the volume in the mid-twentieth century.
- The Alexander Turnbull Library, part of the National Library of New Zealand, in Wellington, which digitised all 65 of its watercolours in 2018.
- The National Library of Australia, Canberra, which in 2004 purchased for an undisclosed sum from the Moreton family in England 56 watercolours found at the estate of the Earl of Ducie in Gloucestershire.
- The Mitchell Library, part of the State Library of New South Wales, Sydney, has two volumes – 18 mostly of fish, and 33 flower paintings – as well as a 1790 painting of the settlement of Norfolk Island.
- The Rijksmuseum, Amsterdam, contains a few works attributed to Raper.

== Gallery ==
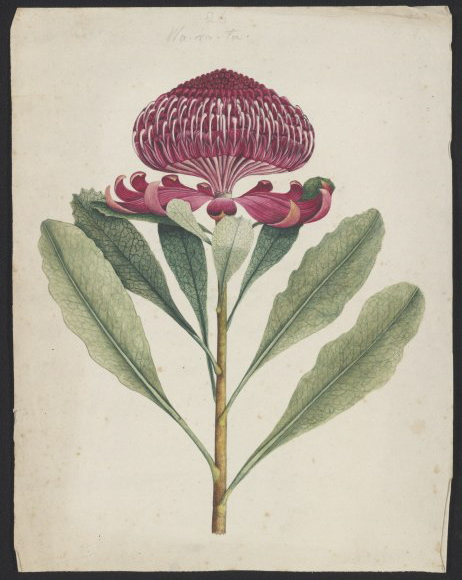
"Wa-ra-ta" (Telopea speciosissima) [1789?]

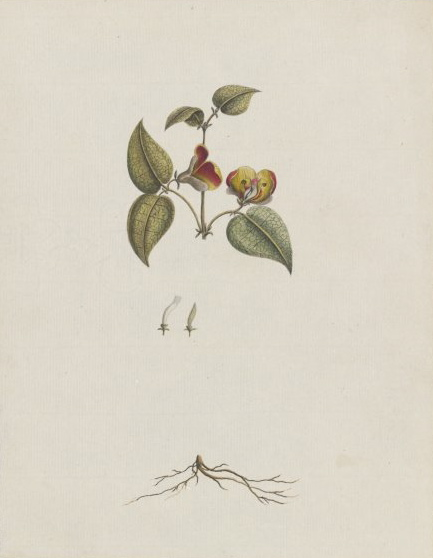
"Handsome flat-pea" (Platylobium formosum) [1789?]

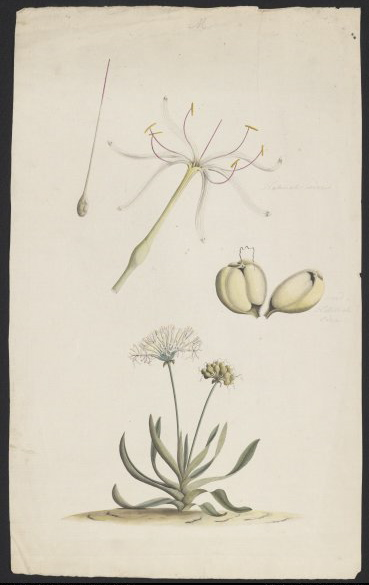
Crinum pedunculatum, flower and seeds above whole plant

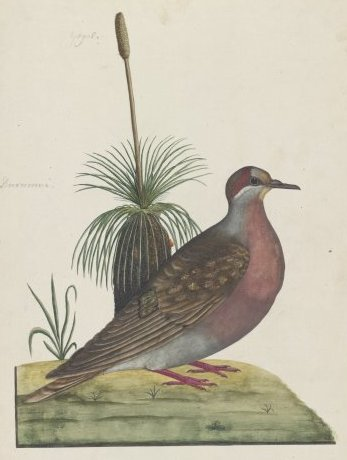
Common bronzewing, Phaps chalcoptera

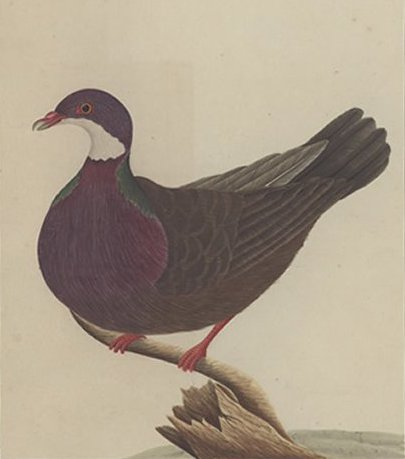
Lord Howe pigeon, Columba vitiensis godmanae
