= Roeper =

Roeper is a German surname. Notable people with the surname include:

- Annemarie Roeper (1918–2012), Austro-Hungarian educator
- Bruno De Roeper (1892–1965), British World War I flying ace
- Richard Roeper (born 1959), American film critic

== See also ==
- Roeper School, a school in Michigan, founded by Annemarie and George Roeper
- Roper (disambiguation)
