= Rupa gold mine =

Ugandan artisanal gold mine

- Location within Uganda
- Location: Karamoja, Uganda; 2°37′43.73″N 34°39′58.19″E
- Products: Gold
- Type: Artisanal

The Rupa Gold mine of Karamoja, Uganda is an artisanal (informal) mine located approximately 10 km north of Moroto Town in Uganda’s Karamoja region. After years of instability caused by inter-clan cattle raiding and a decade-long military disarmament campaign in Karamoja, many people in the region have been finding alternatives to their traditional semi-nomadic pastoralist lifestyles. One such alternative is mining.

Typically male, miners use rudimentary tools to dig holes reaching up to 10 m underground. The miners then spend up to ten hours a day digging earth from tunnels. The earth is then passed to the surface in homemade containers where it is washed and sieved.

Gold extracted at Rupa is bought on-site by dealers from other regions of Uganda and neighbouring Kenya. It is then transferred to either Uganda’s capital, Kampala, or Nairobi, the Kenyan capital, for resale. In early April 2011, the local price paid for 0.1 grams of gold was around 7000 Ugandan shillings, equivalent to around 2.5 US dollars. Generally, miners say that they extract between 0.05 and 0.1 grams (known locally as a “point”) each day.

This local price level was barely half the price level on international commodity markets. In early April 2011, gold was trading at $1,476 per troy ounce, equivalent to $47.45 per gram, or $4.75 per point. The differential between the local and international price reflects the costs involved in transporting output from mines and the profit margins taken by local, regional and global intermediaries. In the absence of official data, estimating the size of the gold deposits at Rupa remains difficult, but local mining officials have said that as many as 10,000 people now depend on the mine for their incomes.

== Safety and Child Labour ==
Anecdotal evidence collected from miners at the Rupa site suggests that injuries and deaths are common. Accidents often occur when unsupported tunnels dug by inexperienced miners collapse, trapping people inside.

Child labour is common, with minors under the age of ten often used to collect water for washing the gold. Whole families sometimes work at the mine, with children absent from school.

== Aerial survey and potential industrial extraction ==
In 2009 Uganda’s government concluded an airborne geophysical study of over 80 percent of the country’s landmass to map mineral deposits. Funded by the World Bank, the project was seen as an important step in developing the country’s extractive sector.

However, due to ongoing security concerns, the survey did not include the Karamoja region. As of mid-2011, according to officials at the Department for Geological Survey and Mines, plans had been drawn up to extend the survey to Karamoja, but funding for this extension remained absent.

Although Ugandan officials have expressed hopes that mining in Karamoja will help develop this severely deprived region local activists and inhabitants have expressed fears that the arrival of industrial extraction could destroy the precarious livelihoods of artisanal miners working at the Rupa site.
