= Roops =

Roops is a surname. Notable people with the surname include:

- Siim Roops (born 1986), Estonian footballer
- Sirje Roops (born 1992), Estonian footballer
