= Ron Raper =

Australian rugby league footballer and coach (1945–2026)

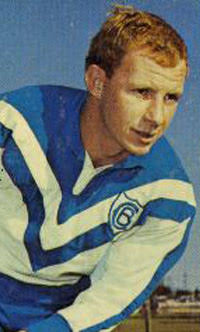

Personal information
- Full name: Ronald Paul Raper
- Born: 22 November 1945 Camperdown, New South Wales, Australia
- Died: 29 June 2026 (aged 80) Brisbane, Queensland

Playing information
- Position: Lock
Club
Years	Team	Pld	T	G	FG	P
1964–1972	Canterbury-Bankstown	168	33	107	10	333
1973–1974	Redcliffe Dolphins	32	2	100	1	207
1977	Wests Panthers	2	0	6	1	13
	Total	202	35	213	12	553
Representative
Years	Team	Pld	T	G	FG	P
1973	Queensland	2	0	0	0	0

Coaching information
Club
Years	Team	Gms	W	D	L	W%
1975–1977	Wests Panthers	77	46	0	31	60
1979	Redcliffe Dolphins	21	7	0	14	33
1983	Wests Panthers	14	3	0	11	21
	Total	112	56	0	56	50
- Relatives: Johnny Raper (brother); Maurie Raper (brother); Gerard Raper (brother); Peter Raper (brother); Aaron Raper (nephew); Stuart Raper (nephew)

Ronald Paul Raper (22 November 1945 – 29 June 2026) was an Australian rugby league footballer and coach from the 1960s and 1970s.

== Early life ==
Raper was born in Camperdown, in inner-western Sydney into a working-class family of nine boys, he played junior football for the East Hills Bulldogs before representing Canterbury's President’s Cup side in 1964. His older brother was footballer Johnny Raper.

== Sporting career ==
Raper served as a lock forward for Canterbury-Bankstown joining them in 1964 and played seven first grade seasons for Canterbury between 1966 and 1972 and played lock in the 1967 Grand Final.

In 1965, Ron started the year in reserve grade and emerged as a talent during the season. In 1966, Ron received the opportunity to play first grade against Newtown when George Taylforth was relegated.

He secured a first grade position for the next seven seasons.

In 1967, he played in all first grade games including the Grand Final against South Sydney. After missing two games in 1968, he played 85 consecutive first grade games between 1968 and 1971.

In 1970, he was appointed captain of the first grade team and captained Canterbury on 27 occasions. He played in the winning Pre-Season Final against St. George and also played in the Semi-Final against St. George.

Injuries finally caught up with Raper in 1971 and after losing his first grade position midway through 1972, he left the club to play for Ryde-Eastwood for the remainder of the season leading them to the Second Division Premiership.

Raper played 168 games for Canterbury and scored 333 points during his career.

He was awarded the Canterbury 'player of the year' in 1967.

In 1973, Raper moved to Brisbane to play for the Redcliffe Dolphins. He represented Queensland in two appearances that year and was unlucky to miss selection on the 1973 Kangaroo tour after breaking his arm in Redcliffe's BRL grand final loss to Valleys.

Raper became coach of the Wests Panthers in 1975 where he guided them to back to back BRL Premierships in 75 and 76 after Wests finished wooden spooners in 1974.

In 2004, Raper was nominated for the Canterbury Bankstown Berries to Bulldogs 70 Year Team of Champions.

On 31 July 2016, the old seniors field at Purtell Park, Bardon, was name the Erica Quinn and Ron Raper Oval, recognizing Raper's services to the Wests Panthers throughout the 1970s, 1980s and 1990s.

== Death ==
Raper died after a long period of ill health on 29 June 2026, at the age of 80.
