= Aaron Raper =

Australian rugby league footballer (born 1971)

Personal information
- Born: 28 July 1971 (age 55) Sydney, New South Wales, Australia

Playing information
- Position: Hooker
Club
| Years | Team | Pld | T | G | FG | P |
|---|---|---|---|---|---|---|
| 1990–95 | Cronulla-Sutherland | 57 | 7 | 0 | 0 | 28 |
| 1996–98 | Parramatta Eels | 39 | 4 | 0 | 0 | 16 |
| 1999–01 | Castleford Tigers | 59 | 7 | 0 | 0 | 33 |
| | Total | 155 | 18 | 0 | 0 | 77 |
Representative
| Years | Team | Pld | T | G | FG | P |
| 1995 | Australia | 1 | 1 | 0 | 0 | 4 |
| 1997 | New South Wales | 1 | 0 | 0 | 0 | 0 |
- Source: As of 22 January 2019
- Father: Johnny Raper
- Relatives: Ron Raper (uncle); Maurie Raper (uncle); Stuart Raper (brother)

Aaron Raper (born 28 July 1971) is an Australian former rugby league footballer who played in the 1990s and 2000s. His position of choice was hooker although he could also fill other spots in the team. Raper played in Australia for the Cronulla-Sutherland Sharks and Parramatta Eels and in England for the Castleford Tigers.

== Background ==
Raper is the son of rugby league immortal Johnny Raper and the brother of former Cronulla Sharks head coach Stuart Raper.

== Playing career ==
Raper was graded by the Cronulla Sharks in 1989. He made his first grade debut in his side's 34−0 loss to the Illawarra Steelers in round 21 of the 1990 season. Numerous injury problems, including a blood clot that prevented him playing a single game in first grade during the 1994 season, severely affected his career and prevented him from achieving the status predicted after a fine season with Cronulla in 1992.

He also represented Australia at the 1995 World Cup, and was selected as an interchange player to represent New South Wales in one game of the 1997 State of Origin series but did not take the field.

At Parramatta, Raper was in the 1997 and 1998 sides which made the finals series. Raper's final first grade game in Australia was the infamous 1998 preliminary final against Canterbury. With Parramatta leading 18–2 with 10 minutes to play, it seemed the club was destined to meet Brisbane the following week in the decider but Canterbury managed to stage an incredible comeback and go on to win the match 32–20 in extra time.

Raper then moved to England to play with Castleford and spent 3 seasons with the club before retiring at the end of 2001.

== Post playing ==
In 2010, Raper was the captain-coach of the Collegians club in the Illawarra Rugby League. He previously coached the Cronulla Sharks Jersey Flegg Cup team and the University of Wollongong Bulls.
