= Johnny Raper =

Australia international rugby league player and coach (1939–2022)

Johnny Raper MBE
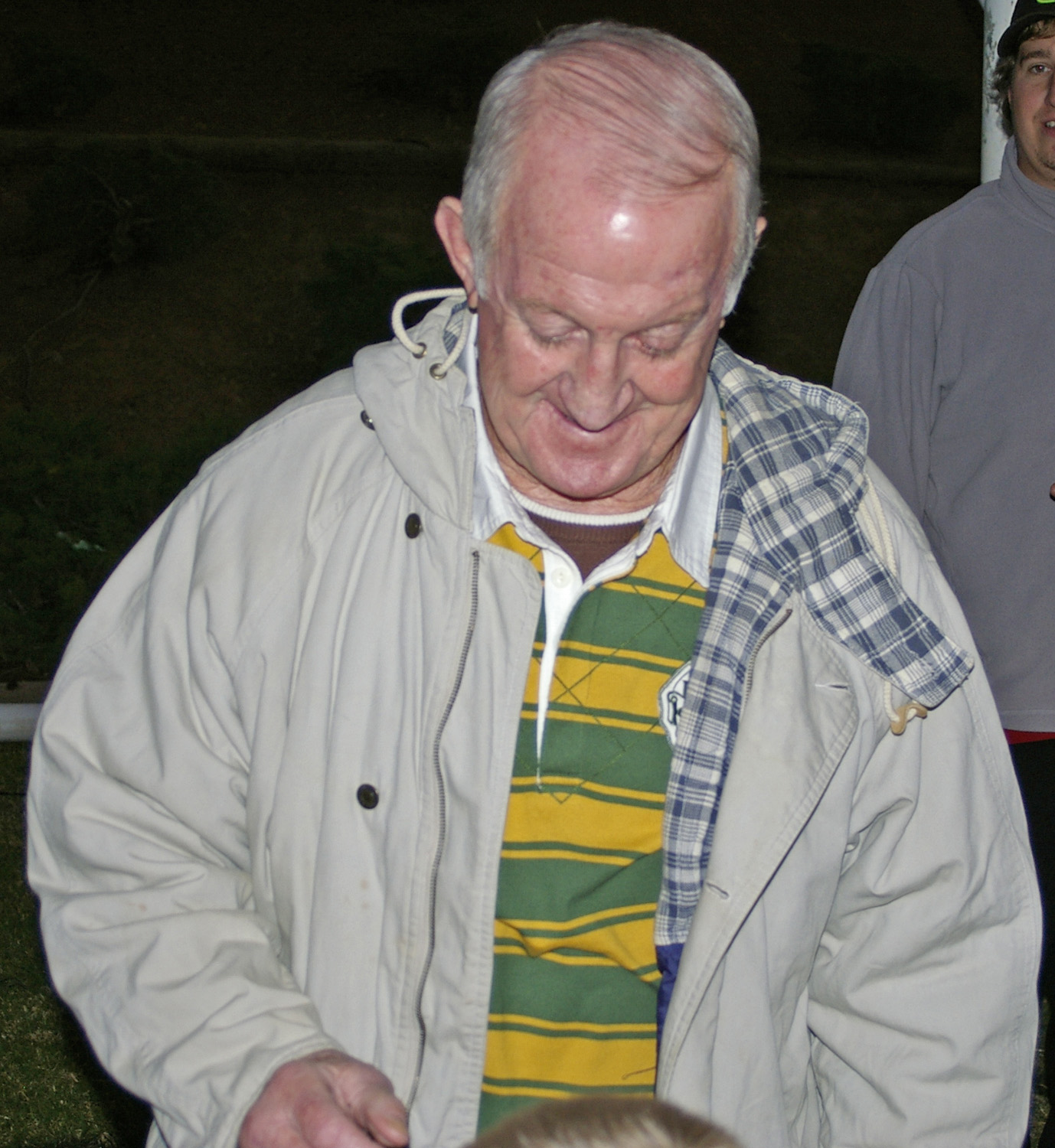
- Raper in 2008

Personal information
- Full name: John William Raper
- Born: 12 April 1939 Camperdown, New South Wales, Australia
- Died: 9 February 2022 (aged 82) Caringbah, New South Wales, Australia

Playing information
- Position: Lock
Club
Years	Team	Pld	T	G	FG	P
1957–1958	Newtown	37	10	0	0	30
1959–1969	St George	185	47	4	0	149
1970–1972	Wests (Newcastle)	39
1973–1974	Kurri Kurri
	Total	261	57	4	0	179
Representative
Years	Team	Pld	T	G	FG	P
1959–1970	New South Wales	24	5		0	15
1959–1968	Australia	39	9	0	0	27

Coaching information
Club
Years	Team	Gms	W	D	L	W%
1969	St George	23	14	0	9	61
1970–72	Wests (Newcastle)
1973–74	Kurri Kurri
1975–76	Cronulla-Sutherland	44	18	2	24	41
1978	Newtown Jets	9	2	1	6	22
	Total	76	34	3	39	45
- Source: As of 1 August 2009
- Relatives: Ron Raper (brother); Maurie Raper (brother); Gerard Raper (brother); Peter Raper (brother); Aaron Raper (son); Stuart Raper (nephew)

John William Raper MBE (12 April 1939 – 9 February 2022) was an Australian professional rugby league footballer and coach. Nicknamed "Chook", he was a lock-forward who earned a then-record of 33 Test caps in the Australia national team between 1959 and 1968. He also played six World Cup games between 1960 and 1968. Raper captained Australia on eight occasions from 1967 to 68 and played in eight consecutive NSWRFL first-grade grand final victories for the St. George Dragons club. He was named as one of the nation's finest footballers of the 20th century.

== Early life ==
Raper was born in Camperdown and grew up in Revesby in south-western Sydney in a working-class family with nine boys. He played his junior rugby league for the Camperdown Dragons before representing Newtown's President's Cup side in 1956.

== Professional playing career ==
=== Sydney ===
Raper joined and made his first grade debut for Newtown in 1957 as an eighteen-year-old. Despite becoming a much lauded lock forward, in his 1957 debut season with the Newtown “Bluebags” (as the team was known then) Raper played in the second row in all of his first grade appearances except one when he played at five-eighth. And throughout the 1958 season for Newtown first grade he played at five-eighth except for one game at centre and one game in the second row. During the 1958 season he had his first taste of representative football against elite opposition when selected to play for combined Sydney against the visiting Great Britain team and then for New South Wales Colts against the British tourists. In both these representative games Raper played at lock forward and opposed one of the great locks of that era in Britain’s Vince Karalius.

In 1959 Raper joined St George as a lock forward and in this position he became an international rugby league star. His legendary cover defence and ball skills saw him acknowledged during his playing career as the best loose-forward the world had ever seen. He played in eight Grand final wins with St George between 1959 and 1966.

Raper attributed his success to a training discipline and fitness fanaticism that was ahead of its time. While St George's early adoption of circuit training in the late 1950s was a major contributing factor in their eleven-year premiership run, Raper's own commitment to additional running and weights every day and often alone, enabled him to achieve a personal goal of being the fittest player in the fittest team in the competition. In 1959–60 he made the first of his three Kangaroo tours, scoring a try on debut in the third Test loss vs Great Britain at Wigan. For the next ten years he was rarely, except for injury, out of the Australian Test team.

Raper's performance in the second Test of the 1963 tour at Swinton which saw the Kangaroos register the biggest win in Anglo-Australian Test history and become the first Australian touring team in fifty years to win the Ashes was pivotal. In the 50–12 victory, Raper had a hand in the first seven tries in the opening 25-minute routing and he gave the final pass in four of them.

In his third Kangaroo tour of 1967–68 Raper suffered a cheekbone fracture in the opening 16–11 Test loss causing him to miss the second Test won by Australia to keep the series alive. Captain-coach Reg Gasnier had broken a leg in the first Test so Raper upon his return to fitness, was deputised and earned the ultimate Australian rugby league honour captaining his country in the 11–3 win over Great Britain played in icy conditions on a frozen ground in Swinton on 21 October 1967.

Raper went on to captain Australia in the first and third Tests against France in 1967–68. Queenslander Peter "Pedro" Gallagher was the captain for the second Test when Raper was injured. For the 1968 World Cup Raper captained Australia in their four undefeated games of the tournament including the 20–2 victory against France in the final at the Sydney Cricket Ground.

Raper's last season with St George was in 1969 as captain-coach. In 1969 he appeared as a guest player for Auckland in a match against the New Zealand national rugby league team to mark the New Zealand Rugby League's diamond jubilee. Raper was awarded Life Membership of the St. George Dragons club in 1971.

=== Newcastle ===
Raper played three seasons with the Western Suburbs Rosellas in the Newcastle competition from 1970 to 1972. He captain coached the club and took them to victory in the 1970 grand final. He finished his playing career with Kurri Kurri from 1973 to 1974.

=== Statistics ===
Point scoring summary

Games	Tries	Goals	F/G	Points
223	57	4	–	179

=== Coaching career ===
Raper returned to Sydney as coach of the Cronulla-Sutherland Sharks in 1975 and 1976, commencing an association with that club later carried on by his sons Stuart and Aaron. He also coached a Lane Cove Rugby Union Club team to victory in the Judd Cup suburban competition in 1977. After five games of the 1978 NSWRFL season and internal turmoil leading to the resignation of first-grade coach Paul Broughton, Raper took over as coach of the Newtown Jets in a caretaker capacity.

== Post-football life and accolades ==
In retirement Raper for a time played a larger-than-life celebrity role: making a record, appearing in commercials for a tyre company and the Liberal party and as an in-demand speaker and guest on radio and TV talk shows. Much higher honours were to follow: an award of a Member of the Order of the British Empire; selection in 1985 as one of the initial four post-war "Immortals" of the Australian game with Churchill, Gasnier and Fulton; appointment in 1988 as an Australian Test selector and representative of the New South Wales Rugby League. Raper was also inducted into the Sport Australia Hall of Fame in 1985. Always regarded as a larrikin in his playing days, Raper is now seen as one of Rugby League's most ardent ambassadors and senior statesmen. In 2000, his portrait was entered into the Archibald Prize. In 2002 Raper was inducted into the Australian Rugby League Hall of Fame. In 2007 he was selected by a panel of experts at lock in an Australian 'Team of the 50s'.

In February 2008, Raper was named in the list of Australia's 100 Greatest Players (1908–2007) which was commissioned by the NRL and ARL to celebrate the code's centenary year in Australia. Raper went on to be named as lock in Australian rugby league's Team of the Century. Announced on 17 April 2008, the team is the panel's majority choice for each of the thirteen starting positions and four interchange players. While playing football, Raper also served in the New South Wales Police Force and in 2008, rugby league's centenary year in Australia, he was named at lock-forward in a NSW Police team of the century. In 2008 New South Wales announced their rugby league team of the century also, and again Raper was named at lock. Raper was named captain and second-row forward in the Western Suburbs Rosellas’ team of the century. On 20 July 2022, Raper was named in the St. George Dragons District Rugby League Clubs team of the century at lock.

== Death ==
Raper spent the last four years of his life in a nursing home, having been diagnosed with dementia. He died on 9 February 2022 in Caringbah, Sydney, at the age of 82.

== Footballing relatives ==
A number of Raper's brothers had success in top-grade rugby league. Ron played a 128-game career for Canterbury over seven seasons from 1966, kicking a field-goal from the halfway line in their 1967 Grand final loss to South Sydney. He played out the end of his career as captain/coach at Wests Brisbane and made two representative appearances for Queensland in 1973. Maurie Raper played eighty-seven first grade matches for Penrith and Cronulla in an eight-year career; Gerard made two first grade appearances for Canterbury in 1977; and Peter, two appearances for Newtown while Michael played in lower grades.

Johnny's son Aaron played as a hooker for Cronulla and Parramatta from 1990 to 1998. During Aaron's exceptional 1992 season he was touted to become the top hooker in Australia, however, an exceptionally bad run with injuries, including a severe blood clot that threatened his life during 1994, prevented Aaron from ever reaching the greater heights. Aaron played representative rugby league only during the Super League war in 1995. He later moved to England but in 2010 made a return to Sydney and played in the Illawarra competition.

== Sources ==
- Whiticker, Alan (2004) Captaining the Kangaroos, New Holland, Sydney
- Writer, Larry (1995) Never Before, Never Again, Pan MacMillan, Sydney
- Whiticker, Alan & Hudson, Glen (2006) The Encyclopedia of Rugby League Players, Gavin Allen Publishing, Sydney

== Footnotes ==
Sporting positions
Preceded by Peter Gallagher	Captain Australia; 1967–1968	Succeeded by John Sattler
