= Stuart Raper =

Australian rugby league footballer (born 1965)

Personal information
- Born: 5 January 1965 (age 61)

Playing information
Club
Years	Team	Pld	T	G	FG	P
1984–1986	Cronulla-Sutherland	3	0	0	0	0
1986–1987	Oldham	31	11	0	0	44
1989	Western Suburbs Magpies	5	0	0	0	0
	Total	39	11	0	0	44

Coaching information
Club
Years	Team	Gms	W	D	L	W%
1997–2001	Castleford Tigers	127	67	7	53	53
2001–2003	Wigan Warriors	63	45	2	16	71
2004–2006	Cronulla Sharks	74	31	0	43	42
	Total	264	143	9	112	54
- Father: Johnny Raper
- Relatives: Ron Raper (uncle); Gerard Raper (uncle); Peter Raper (uncle); Maurie Raper (uncle); Aaron Raper (brother)

Stuart Raper (born 5 January 1965) is an Australian former professional rugby league footballer and coach. He has since become a sideline commentator for the NRL with Foxsports. He is widely known for his father being Rugby League legend Johnny Raper and he also is the only Cronulla-Sutherland Sharks coach to win the President's Cup (under-21s) for the club in 1994.

== Playing career ==
Raper originally signed on to play with the Cronulla-Sutherland Sharks in the early 1980s, and made his first grade début at the age of 18 against the Illawarra Steelers in round 25 of the 1983 NSWRFL season. After a promising start to his first grade career he was never able to live up to his famous father's shadow while at the Sharks and after only eight first grade games with them in three years, decided it was best to move on in an attempt to further his career.

Raper moved to England for the 1986–87 season and signed for Oldham. Raper made 31 appearances for Oldham in that season and scored 11 tries but his efforts didn't prevent Oldham from being relegated from the 1st Division. He left the club at the end of the season.

In 1989 Raper signed on with Sydney's Western Suburbs Magpies on a one-year deal with the club. His opportunities though were yet again limited and after only a mere five appearances for the season his contract was not renewed and his first grade career came to an end.

=== County Cup Final appearances ===
Stuart Raper played loose forward, in Oldham's 6–27 defeat by Wigan in the 1986–87 Lancashire Cup Final at Knowsley Road, St. Helens on Sunday 19 October 1986.

== Coaching career ==
After a brief playing career with both the Cronulla-Sutherland Sharks and the Western Suburbs Magpies Raper signed on to his first coaching role in 1994 with the Under 21s Sharks side. Here Raper inherited an extremely talented side (featuring Adam Dykes, Geoff Bell and David Peachey) and with them excelled as he took the team to the club's first President's Cup in his début season as coach.

Following his immediate success with the Under 21 side he was duly appointed the new coach of the Sharks reserve grade side for the 1995 season. More success followed for Raper (as he inherited much the same side from his Under 21 coaching days) as after two seasons he was successful in coaching his side to the reserve grade title in 1996.

=== Castleford Tigers ===
After a successful 1996 season at home with Cronulla, Raper was offered the head coaching role at English Super League club the Castleford Tigers and joined on 27 April 1997. At the start of 1997's Super League II Castleford were seen by many as a team simply making up the numbers and few held hopes for their survival to avoid being relegated. Throughout the season they continually struggled and in the end only just managed to avoid being relegated, eventually finishing tenth.

With a new season in 1998 many pundits predicted the Tigers would be one of the sides to face the drop down to National League One by the end of the season. With the odds stacked against Raper and his position continually under pressure after a poor first season he defied many odds by keeping his Castleford side near the top of the table for the majority of the season in which they eventually finished sixth.

The 1999 season saw the Castleford Tigers continue their progress. The season started with the side missing out on the last Challenge Cup Final to be held at Wembley Stadium after a last-gasp score saw London Broncos knock the side out. The positive cup run continued into the league and the Castleford Tigers ended the league season in the top 5. Raper masterminded the side past Wigan Warriors and local rivals Leeds Rhinos and took the Tigers within 80 minutes of the Grand Final at Old Trafford. They were knocked out in the last knock-out stage by St. Helens. Raper is still highly regarded in the hearts of the club's fans.

2000 was Raper's last season with the Castleford Tigers and his performance somewhat mirrored their previous season as he yet again took his side to a finishing place of fifth and into the finals for a consecutive season. He took the opportunity to coach Wigan Warriors after not being provided with the finances he claimed were required to take the Tigers onto the next level. The club subsequently fell into decline and were relegated in 2005 - a fate that would have arguably come much earlier without Raper's guidance.

=== Wigan Warriors ===
At the end of another successful season in 2000 with the Castleford Tigers, Raper was offered the head coaching role at Super League giants the Wigan Warriors for the 2001 season.

His first season in charge at his new club proved to be a fruitful one for Raper as Wigan finished second on the end of season table and made it all the way to the 2001 Super League Grand Final; although they ended up losing heavily to Bradford Bulls in a poor performance.

He remained with Wigan for a further two seasons in 2002 and 2003 where they finished a respectable third in both seasons though were never able to progress to the Final and obtain a Super League title in either. Raper did however enjoy his first piece of English rugby league silverware in 2002 when he took his Wigan Warriors side to victory in the Challenge Cup. They beat none other than local rivals St. Helens, 21–12.

=== Cronulla-Sutherland Sharks ===
During the 2004 season Raper was called home to the Sharks and originally found himself as an assistant coach to then head coach Chris Anderson. Though before the season's end he was called on to take the reins of their first grade squad.

At the start of his tenure at the Sharks, the former Cronulla pupil was given the task of rebuilding the club after they failed to make the NRL playoffs in 2003 for the first time in four seasons.

While Raper's first season record after taking over from Anderson was modest, he and his coaching team dealt with several obstacles in 2004 and showed some classy football against the top sides, including beating the Brisbane Broncos at Suncorp Stadium midway through the season as well as upsetting ladder leaders the Sydney Roosters at Allianz Stadium just four weeks out from the finals.

2005 started very well for Cronulla and Raper, however, by the end of the season the Sharks had limped home into 7th place in the finals. This form slump coincided with playmaker Brett Kimmorley's poor performance in Game I of the 2005 State of Origin series, and further poor performances after his axing from the representative side. The Sharks lost to St George Illawarra in the first round of the semi-finals and were eliminated.

2006 was to be Stuart Raper's final season at the club. Raper came under heavy criticism for the way he coached the side, mostly for his persistence with the Adam Dykes/Brett Kimmorley halves pairing, which many deemed to be unsuccessful. Raper was also criticised for not having a structured game plan as well as other questionable player selections. The season ended with a 10-game losing streak, including losses to a heavily depleted Brisbane Broncos side, as well as a second half capitulation at home against Penrith, where Raper's team let in 20 points in 16 minutes to lose a seemingly un-losable game.

Ricky Stuart was appointed Raper's replacement for 2007.

He now worked as a commentator and analyst for Fox Sports.

In 2017, he was appointed Referees High Performance Manager for the New South Wales Rugby League
