= Roopa =

arun
- Gender: Female
- Language: Bengali; Hindi; Gujarati; Kannada; Malayalam; Marathi; Oriya; Sanskrit; Tamil; Telugu

Origin
- Meaning: "blessed with beauty"
- Region of origin: India

Other names
- Related names: Rupa

Roopa (Hindi: रूपा) is a female given name in many languages of India, which means "blessed with beauty". Roopa may refer to:

== Notable people named Roopa ==
- D. Roopa, Indian police officer
- Roopa (actress) (born 1960), South Indian actress.
- Roopa Farooki (born 1974), British writer.
- Roopa Ganguly (born 1966), Indian actress, playback singer and politician.
- Roopa Iyer (born 1985), Indian film director, actor, dancer, choreographer, model and businesswoman.
- Roopa Nagraj (born 1983), Emirati cricketer.
- Roopa Pai (date of birth missing), Indian computer engineer, journalist and children's author
- Roopa Ram (born 1954), Indian politician, member of Bharatiya Janata Party.
- Roopa Rao (born 1981), Indian director.
- Roopa Revathi (born 1984), Indian playback singer and violinist.
- Roopa Sree (born 1970), Indian film and television actress.
- Roopa Unnikrishnan (date of birth missing), Indian-born American sports shooter.

== See also ==
- Rupa
