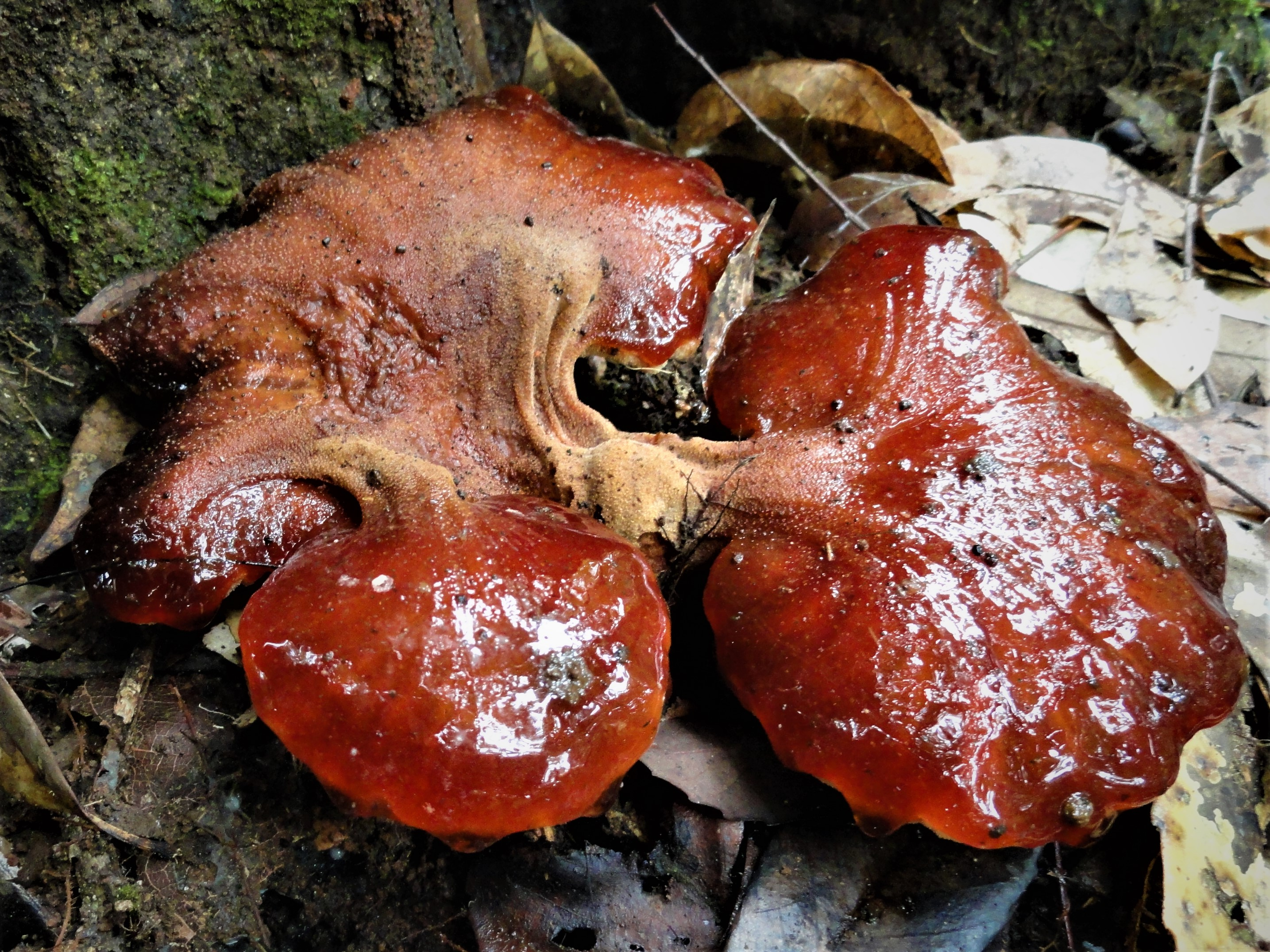
- Fistulina subhepatica in Laos

Scientific classification
- Domain: Eukaryota
- Kingdom: Fungi
- Division: Basidiomycota
- Class: Agaricomycetes
- Order: Agaricales
- Family: Fistulinaceae
- Genus: Fistulina
- Species: F. subhepatica

Binomial name
- Fistulina subhepatica B.K.Cui & J.Song (2014)

= Fistulina subhepatica =

Species of fungus

Fistulina subhepatica is a species of fungus in the family Fistulinaceae. It is found in Yunnan Province in subtropical China, where it causes brown rot on Castanopsis and Lithocarpus. It was described as new to science in 2014 by Bao-Kai Cui and Jie Song. It is named for its resemblance to the common beefsteak fungus, Fistulina hepatica, from which it can be distinguished by its larger spores (measuring 4–6 by 3–4.5 μm), and generative hyphae with clamp connections.
