= Auriculariopsis albomellea =

Scientific classification
- Domain: Eukaryota
- Kingdom: Fungi
- Division: Basidiomycota
- Class: Agaricomycetes
- Order: Agaricales
- Family: Schizophyllaceae
- Genus: Auriculariopsis
- Species: A. albomellea

Binomial name
- Auriculariopsis albomellea Bondartsev) Kotl.

Species of fungus

Auriculariopsis albomellea is a species of fungus belonging to the family Schizophyllaceae.

It is native to Eurasia.
