= F. hepatica =

F. hepatica may refer to:

- Fasciola hepatica, a flatworm species
- Fistulina hepatica, a fungus species
