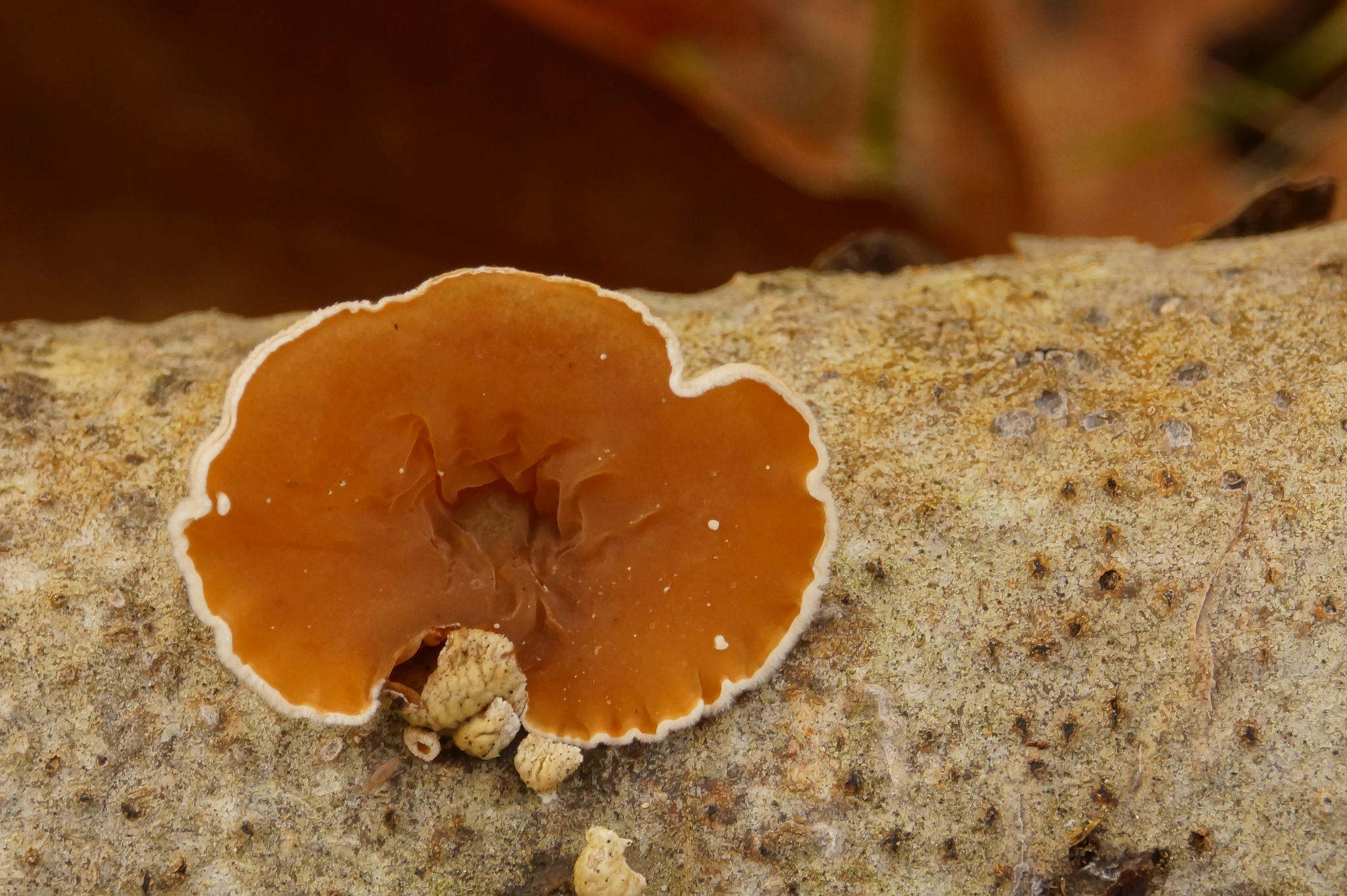

Scientific classification
- Domain: Eukaryota
- Kingdom: Fungi
- Division: Basidiomycota
- Class: Agaricomycetes
- Order: Agaricales
- Family: Schizophyllaceae
- Genus: Schizophyllum
- Species: S. amplum

Binomial name
- Schizophyllum amplum (Lév.) Nakasone (1996)

Synonyms
- Cyphella ampla Lév. (1848)

= Schizophyllum amplum =

Species of fungus

Schizophyllum amplum is a species of fungus, also known as poplar bells. It is a small inedible bell-shaped fungus that grows from September until November, with a cap sized between 5–15 mm. The fungus grows on fallen branches of a number of hardwood trees. It was transferred to the genus Schizophyllum in 1996 by Karen K. Nakasone as a new combination after a study of Auriculariopsis albomellea and Phlebia albida .

It is common in Europe but found across the world including the United States, Netherlands, France, Spain, Romania, New Zealand, Canada, Austria, Germany, Hungary, Yugoslavia, Russia, Iran and Denmark.
