= Fistulina americana =

Scientific classification
- Kingdom: Fungi
- Division: Basidiomycota
- Class: Agaricomycetes
- Order: Agaricales
- Family: Fistulinaceae
- Genus: Fistulina
- Species: F. americana

Binomial name
- Fistulina americana Y.C. Dai, D.W. Li & Meng Zhou

Species of fungus

Fistulina americana is a species of bracket fungus in the family Fistulinaceae.

== Description ==
Fistulina americana is red.
