= Fistulina pumiliae =

Scientific classification
- Kingdom: Fungi
- Division: Basidiomycota
- Class: Agaricomycetes
- Order: Agaricales
- Family: Fistulinaceae
- Genus: Fistulina
- Species: F. pumiliae

Binomial name
- Fistulina pumiliae G.C.González, Barroetaveña & Pildain

Species of fungus

Fistulina pumiliae
- Mycological characteristics
- Pores on hymenium
- Ecology is saprotrophic
- Edibility is unknown

Fistulina pumiliae is a species of fungus within the order Agaricales, native to Argentina.

== Taxonomy ==
The species was first described by Gabriela C. González, Carolina Barroetaveña and María Belén Pildain in 2021, based on specimens from Los Alerces National Park. The holotype is deposited in the Fungarium of the Centro de Investigacion y Extension Forestal Andino Patagonico, under the catalog number HCFC 1330.
