= Alpha,alpha-trehalose phosphorylase (configuration-retaining) =

Enzyme family

Identifiers
- EC no.: 2.4.1.231

Databases
- IntEnz: IntEnz view
- BRENDA: BRENDA entry
- ExPASy: NiceZyme view
- KEGG: KEGG entry
- MetaCyc: metabolic pathway
- PRIAM: profile
- PDB structures: RCSB PDB PDBe PDBsum
Search
- PMC: articles
- PubMed: articles
- NCBI: proteins

Alpha,alpha-trehalose phosphorylase (configuration-retaining) (EC 2.4.1.231) is an enzyme that catalyzes the chemical reaction

trehalose
P_{i}
P_{i}
α-D-glucose
+
glucose 1-phosphate

Thus, the two substrates of this enzyme characterised from the fungus Schizophyllum commune are trehalose and orthophosphate (P_{i}). Its products are α-D-glucose and α-D-glucose 1-phosphate. The reaction is reversible and preserves the stereochemistry at the anomeric centre.

This enzyme belongs to the family of glycosyltransferases, specifically the hexosyltransferases. The systematic name of this enzyme class is alpha,alpha-trehalose:phosphate alpha-D-glucosyltransferase. It is also called trehalose phosphorylase[ambiguous].
