= Injury =

Physiological damage to an organism

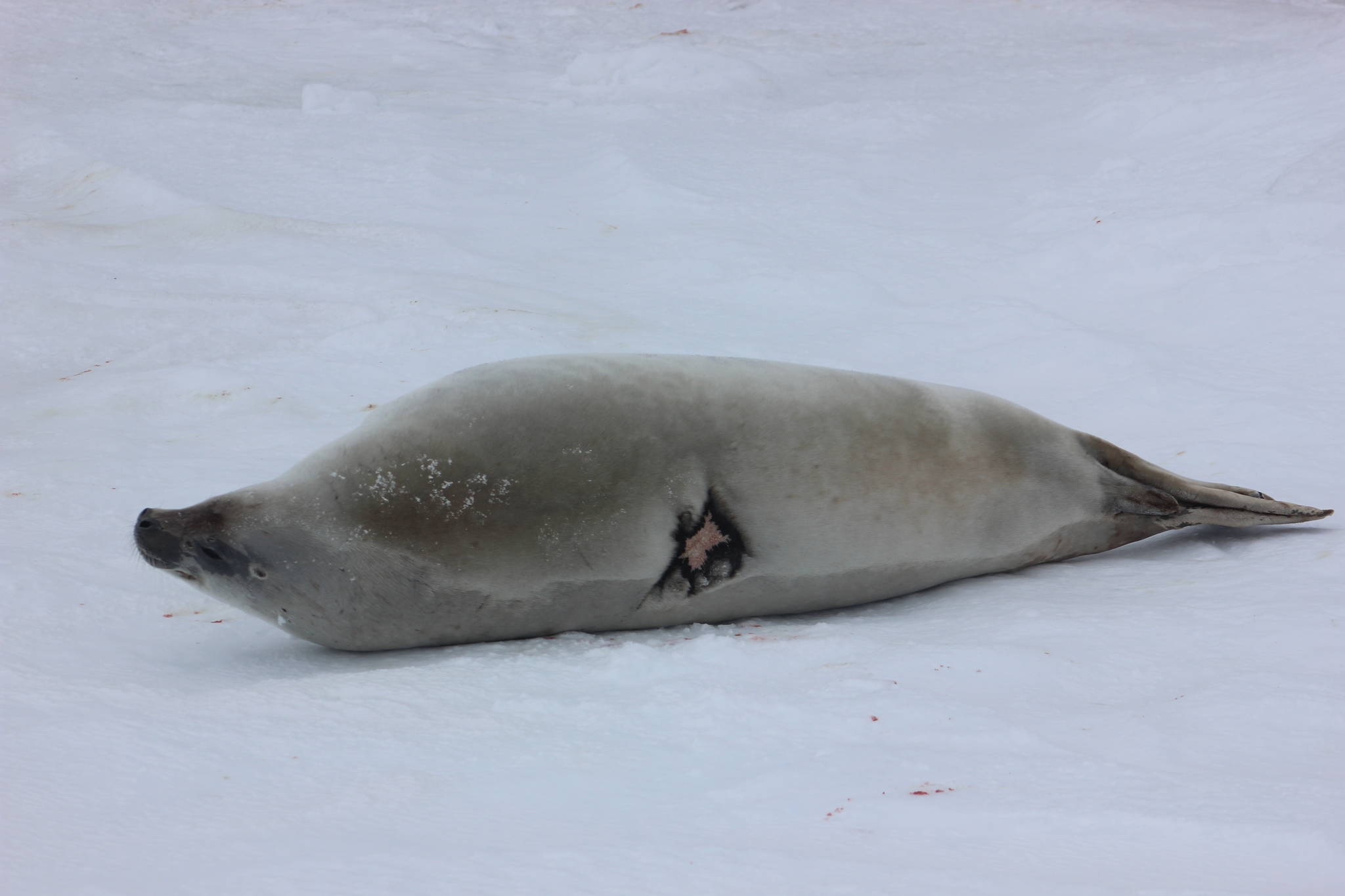
A crabeater seal injured by a predator

An injury is physiological harm or damage to a living body of an organism. The response to an injury, whether in humans, in other animals, in plants, in fungi, or in single-celled eukaryotes such as choanoflagellates, is substantially shared, implying that the mechanisms are ancient.

Injuries can be caused in many ways, including mechanical trauma, toxins, interactions with other organisms, or abiotic factors in the environment. In many animal taxa, injury prompts an inflammatory response that initiates wound healing. In both plants and animals, substances are released to help occlude the wound, limiting fluid loss and the entry of pathogens. Many organisms secrete antimicrobial chemicals, which limit wound infection; animals have immune responses for the same purpose. Both plants and animals have mechanisms of regrowth that may result in complete or partial healing of the injury.

== Taxonomic range ==
=== Animals ===
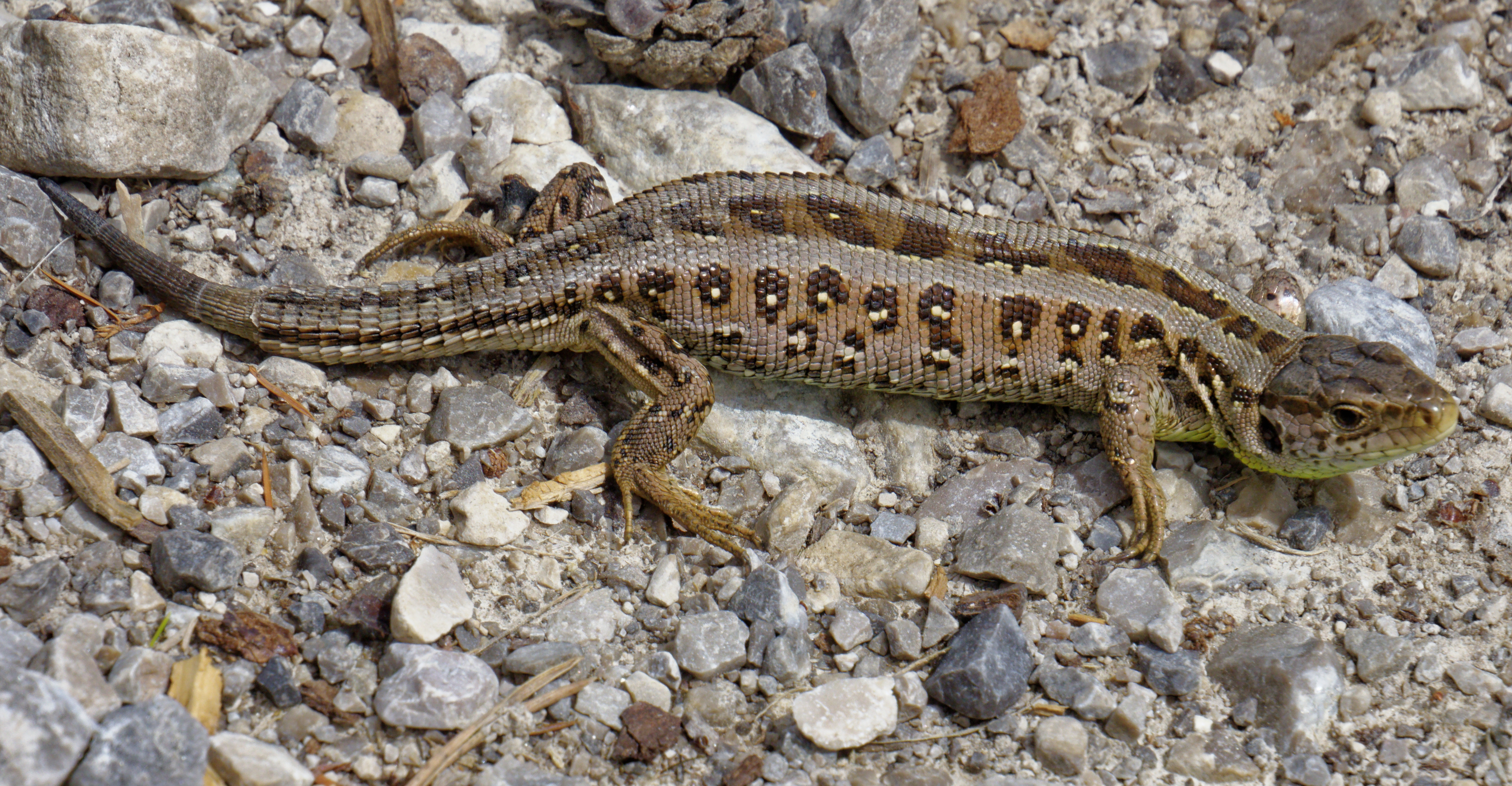
A sand lizard that has shed its tail when attacked by a predator, and has started to regrow a tail from the site of the injury

An injury in animals is sometimes defined as mechanical damage to an anatomical structure caused by an external force, but it has a wider connotation of physical damage with any cause, including drowning, accidents, blows, weapons, burns, and poisoning. Such damage may result from attempted predation, territorial fights, falls, and abiotic factors.

An injury triggers an inflammatory response in animals of many different phyla. This prompts coagulation of the blood or body fluid, followed by wound healing, which may be rapid, as in cnidarians. Arthropods are able, to some extent, to repair injuries to the cuticle that forms their exoskeleton.

Animals in several phyla, including annelids, arthropods, cnidarians, molluscs, nematodes, and vertebrates, are able to produce antimicrobial peptides to fight off infection following an injury.

==== Humans ====
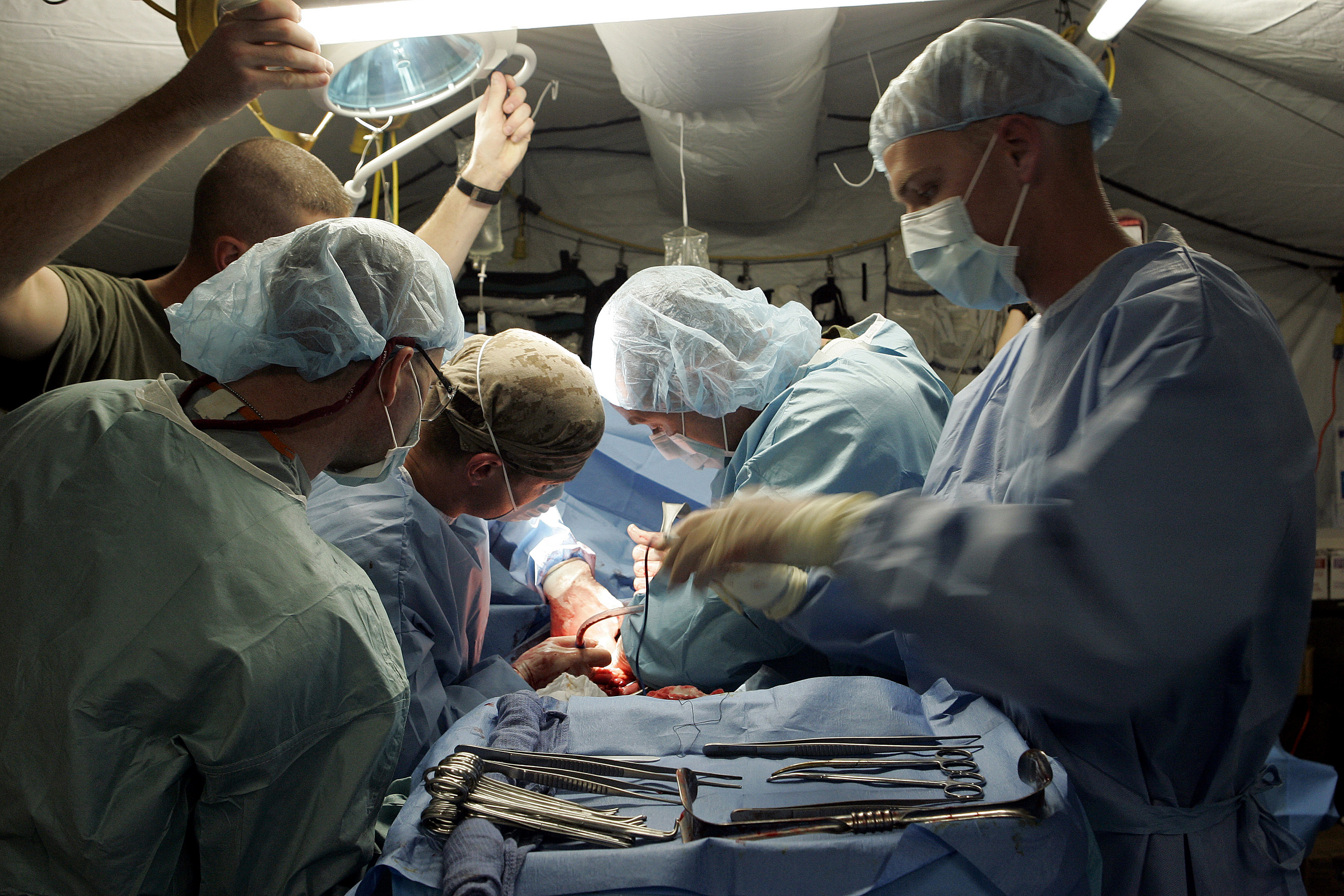
Injuries to humans elicit an elaborate response including emergency medicine, trauma surgery (illustrated), and pain management.

Injuries in humans have been studied extensively for their importance in medicine. Much of medical practice, including emergency medicine and pain management, is dedicated to treating injuries. The World Health Organization has developed a classification of injuries in humans by categories, including mechanism, objects/substances producing injury, place of occurrence, activity when injured, and the role of human intent. In addition to physical harm, injuries can cause psychological harm, including post-traumatic stress disorder.

=== Plants ===
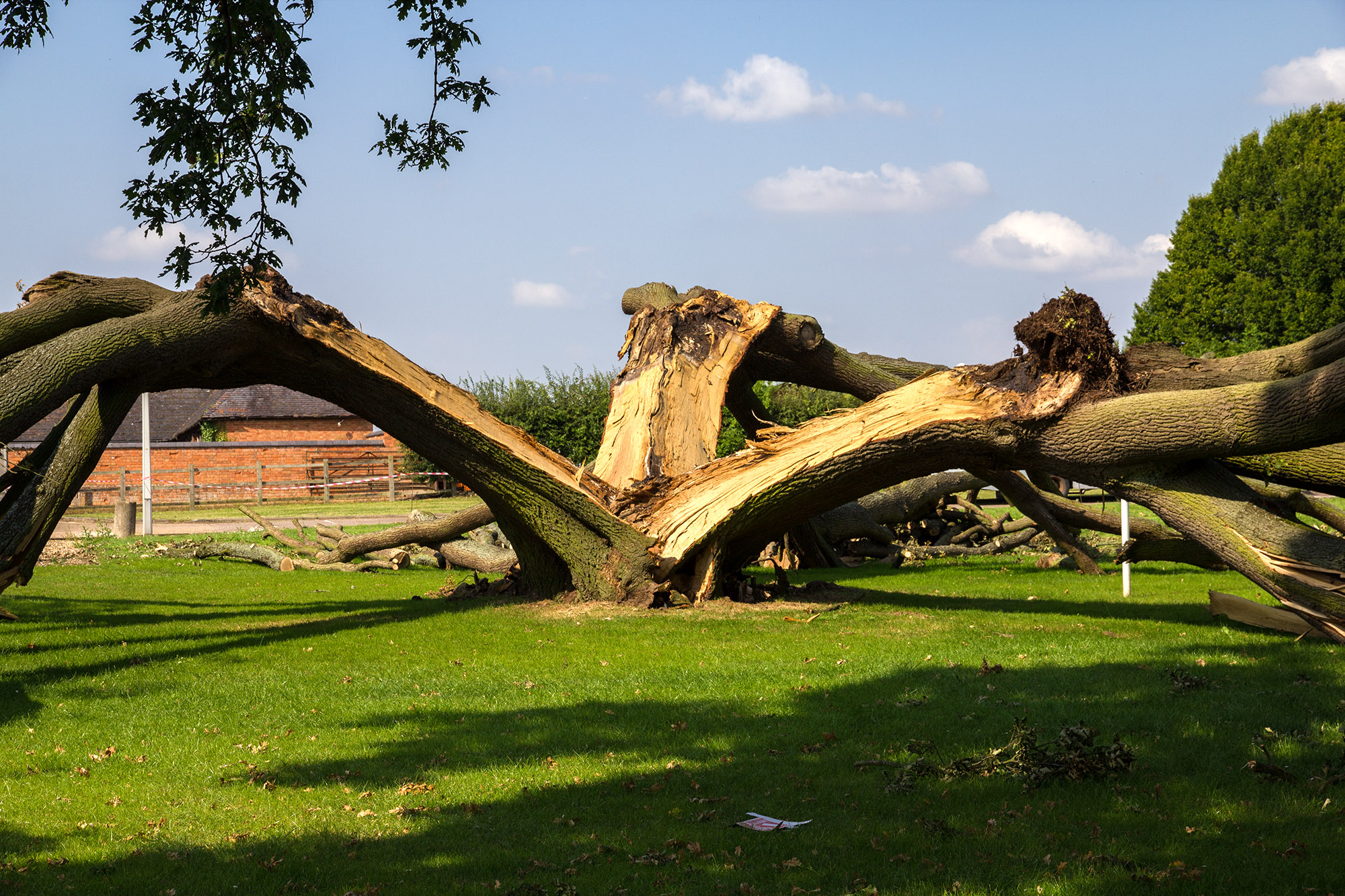
Oak tree split by lightning, an abiotic cause of injury.

In plants, injuries result from the consumption of plant parts by herbivorous animals, including insects and mammals; from damage to tissues by plant pathogens such as bacteria and fungi, which may gain entry after herbivore damage or in other ways; and from abiotic factors such as heat, freezing, flooding, lightning, and pollutants such as ozone. Plants respond to injury by signalling that damage has occurred, secreting materials that seal off the damaged area, producing antimicrobial chemicals, and, in woody plants, regrowing over wounds.

=== Fungi ===
Fungi with septate hyphae, or filaments with partitions, can block septal pores if a hypha is injured. In the Mucoromycota, which mostly lack septa, wounding a hypha produces a rapid response in which the protoplasm inside the hypha forms a gel. Some fungi, such as the ascomycete Trichoderma atroviride, respond to mechanical damage by regenerating damaged hyphae, effectively healing the injury. In the basidiomycetes Schizophyllum commune and Sclerotium rolfsii, damage to the mycelium (the mat of hyphae) triggers the production of reproductive conidia. Several species of Trichoderma also produce conidia in response to injury.

== Ancient eukaryote mechanism ==
Plants cannot move away from a source of injury as animals do, nor are their immune reactions as elaborate as those in animals. However, there are multiple parallels between plant and animal responses to injury. Both signal damage with calcium ions, which activate receptors to initiate a response. Both also signal damage with reactive oxygen species, which drive metabolic changes, such as enabling cells to multiply to repair damaged tissues. Both have pattern recognition receptors on the surfaces of their cells, triggered by invading pathogens. Both have a "primitive" inflammatory response that releases antimicrobial peptides; additionally, animals have mobile immune cells capable of more complex responses. Both have mechanisms to seal the wound site. Finally, plants and many animals can regenerate some damaged parts.

Several of these mechanisms, including receptors, calcium signalling, reactive oxygen species, adenosine triphosphate release, kinase cascades, and oxylipin signalling, are also found in fungi such as Trichoderma. Single-celled eukaryotes, such as choanoflagellates, substantially share the pathways found in plants and animals for detecting damage and pathogens. Extracellular adenosine triphosphate is a signal that promotes healing of wounds to the epithelium in both bilateria (such as vertebrates) and in non-bilaterians such as cnidaria. The signal is detected by a P2X receptor; these receptors occur across the animal kingdom in phyla including sponges, cnidaria, placozoa, mollusca, arthropoda, and chordata, and in both fungi and green plants. Such sharing between eukaryote groups implies that these damage response mechanisms are ancient and have been conserved in evolution.

Thibaut Brunet and Detlev Arendt propose that the last eukaryotic common ancestor (LECA) possessed a calcium-based wound healing response. They argue that the mechanism's purpose was to detect and heal a potentially fatal opening in the cell membrane. They propose that it worked by detecting an inflow of calcium ions, which provoked a contraction in muscle-like actomyosin proteins. This in turn caused vesicles to fuse with the cell membrane (exocytosis), healing the opening and preventing the cell from splitting open.

How the last eukaryotic common ancestor may have detected and repaired a hole in its membrane

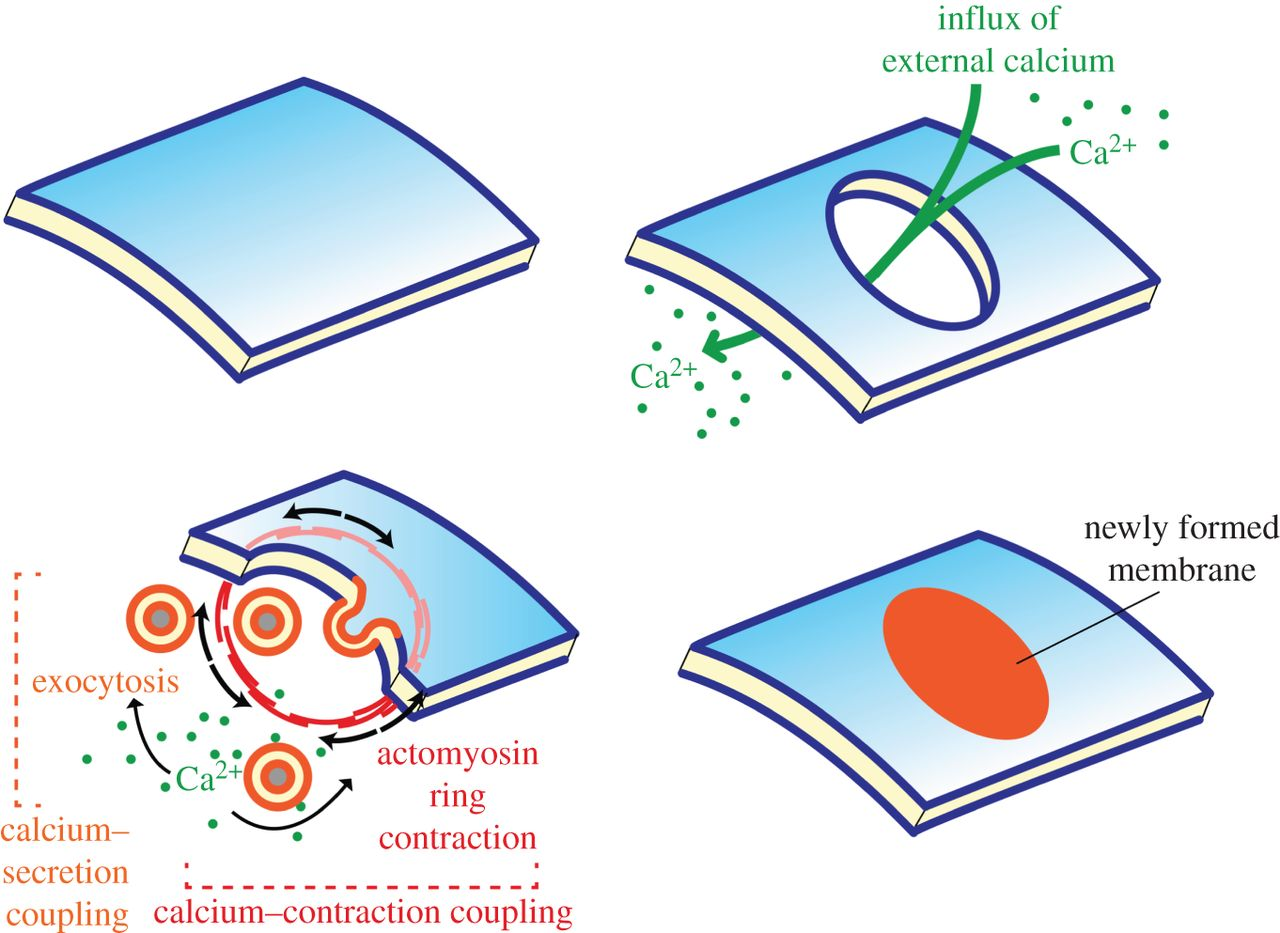

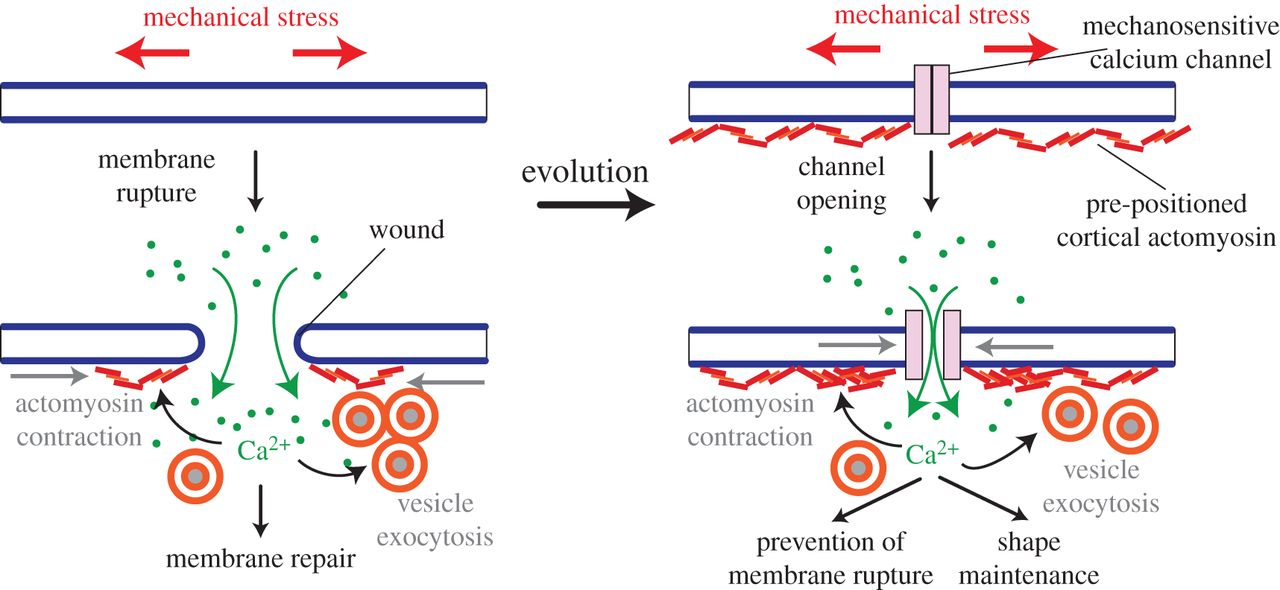
