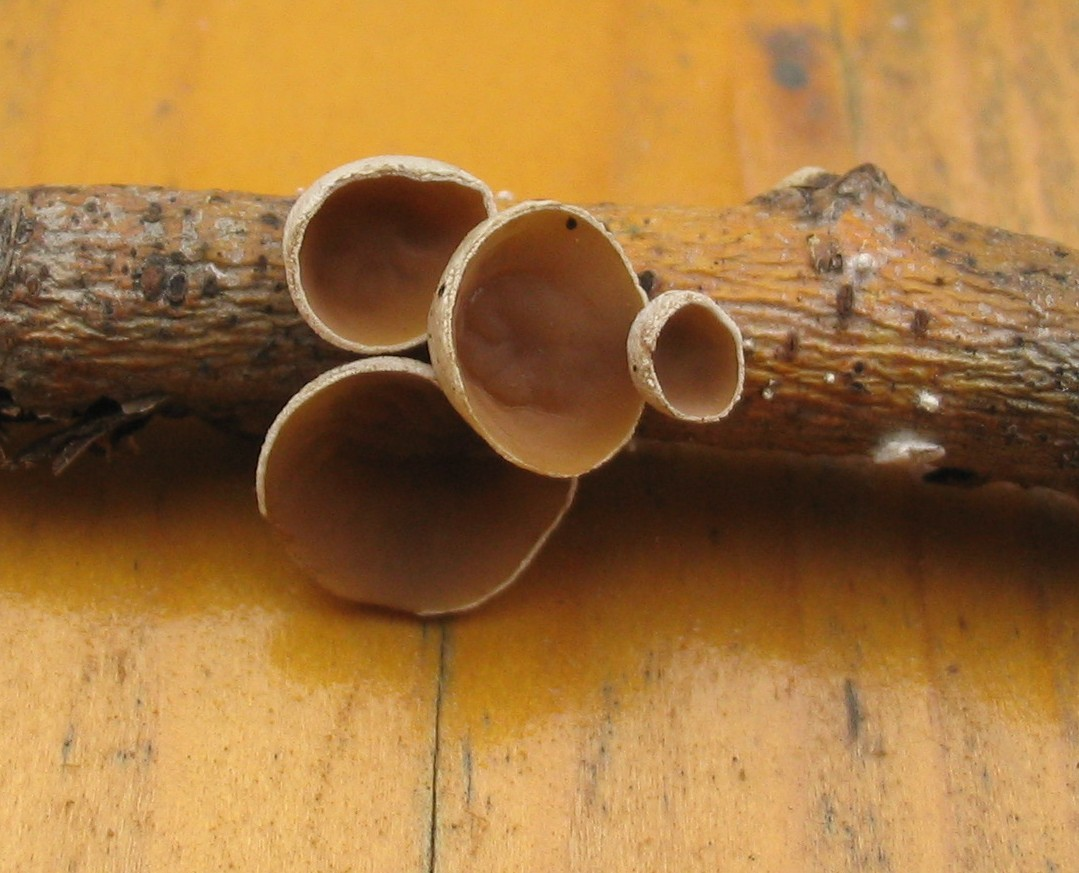
- Auriculariopsis ampla

Scientific classification
- Kingdom: Fungi
- Division: Basidiomycota
- Class: Agaricomycetes
- Order: Agaricales
- Family: Schizophyllaceae
- Genus: Auriculariopsis; Maire (1902)

Type species
- Auriculariopsis ampla (Lév.) Maire (1902)

Species
- Auriculariopsis albomellea Auriculariopsis ampla Auriculariopsis lanata Auriculariopsis melzer Auriculariopsis patelliformis

= Auriculariopsis =

Genus of fungi

Auriculariopsis is a fungal genus in the family Schizophyllaceae. The genus was described by mycologist René Maire in 1902. Auriculariopsis species have cup-shaped fruit bodies.

== See also ==
- List of Agaricales genera
