= Injury in plants =

Wound caused by an external source

Injury in plants is damage caused by other organisms or by the non-living (abiotic) environment to plants. Animals that commonly cause injury to plants include insects, mites, nematodes, and herbivorous mammals; damage may also be caused by plant pathogens including fungi, bacteria, and viruses. Abiotic factors that can damage plants include heat, freezing, flooding, lightning, ozone gas, and pollutant chemicals.

Plants respond to injury by signalling that damage has occurred, by secreting materials to seal off the damaged area, by producing antimicrobial chemicals, and in woody plants by regrowing over wounds.

== Factors ==
=== Biotic ===
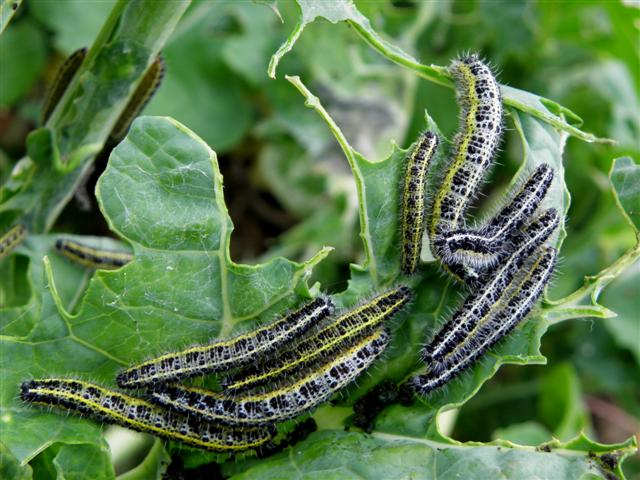
Pieris brassicae caterpillars damaging a Brassica crop

Animals that commonly cause injury to plants include pests such as insects, mites, and nematodes. These variously bite or abrade plant parts such as leaves, stems, and roots, or as is common among the true bugs, pierce the plant's surface and suck plant juices. The resulting injuries may admit plant pathogens such as bacteria and fungi, which may extend the injury. Caterpillar larvae of agricultural pests such as cabbage white butterflies (Pieridae) can completely defoliate Brassica crops. Molluscs such as snails graze on plants including grasses and forbs, abrading them with their rasp-like radula; they can inflict substantial damage to crops. Grazing mammals including livestock such as cattle, too, bite off or break parts of plants including grasses, forbs, and forest trees, causing injury, and again, potentially admitting pathogens.

=== Abiotic ===
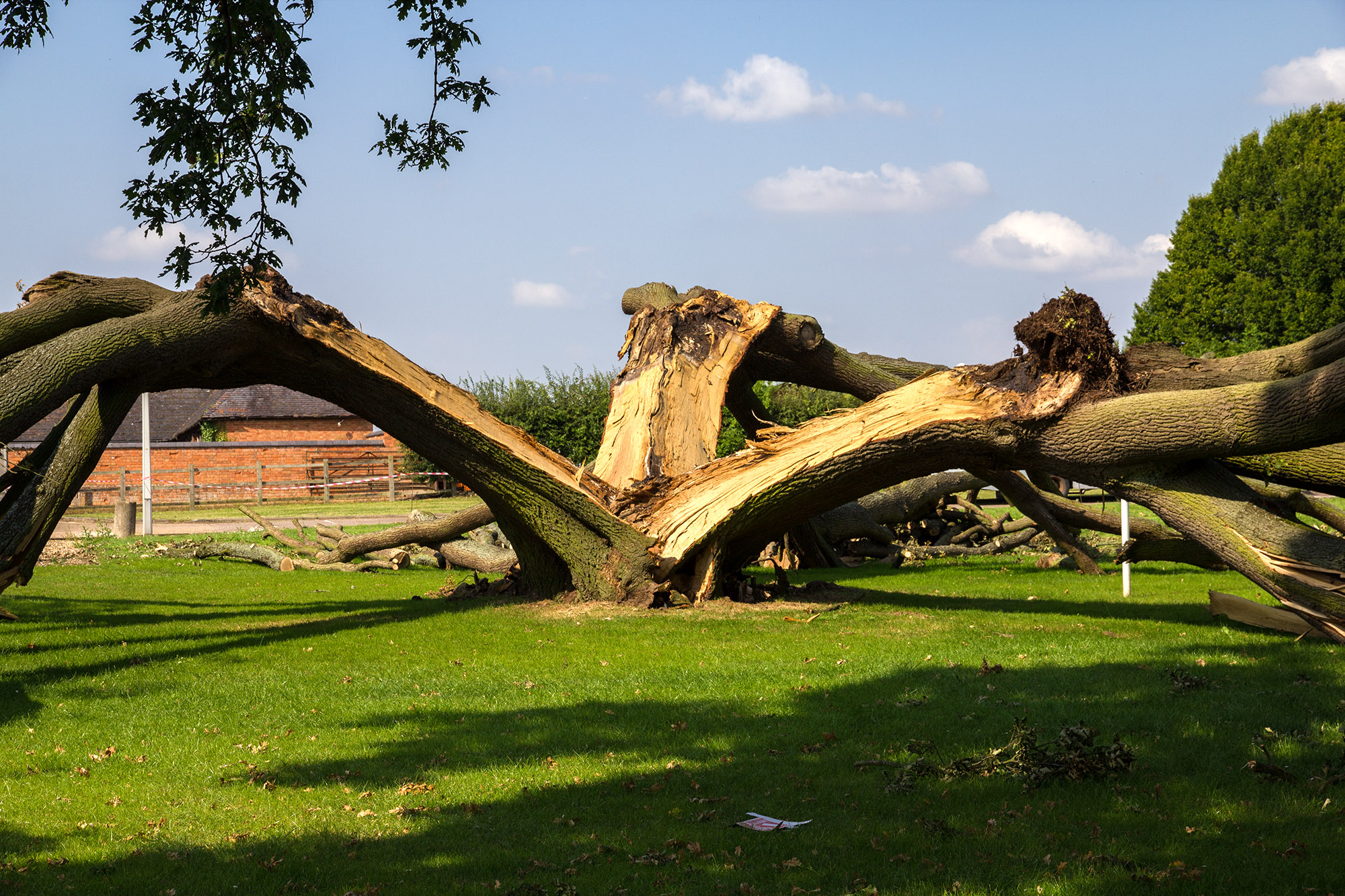
Oak tree split by lightning

Abiotic factors that can damage plants include heat, freezing, flooding, lightning strikes, ozone gas, and pollutant chemicals.

Heat can kill any plant, given a sufficient temperature. Alpine plants tend to die at around 47 Celsius; temperate plants at around 51 Celsius; and tropical plants at nearly 58 Celsius: but there is some overlap depending on species. Similarly among cereal crops, temperate barley and oat die at around 49 Celsius, but tropical maize at 55 Celsius.

Freezing affects plants variously, according to each species' ability to resist frost damage. Many forbs, including many garden flowers, are tender with little tolerance to frost, and die or are seriously damaged when frozen. Many woody plants are able to supercool, with tough buds and stems containing molecules that lower the freezing point or help to prevent the nucleation of ice crystals, and cell walls that mechanically protect cells against freezing.

Flooding of soil quickly kills or injures many plants. The leaves become yellow (chlorosis) and die, progressively up the stem, within about five days after the roots are flooded. The roots lose the ability to absorb water and nutrients.

Lightning strikes kill or injure plants, from root crops like beet and potato, which are instantly cooked in the ground, to trees such as coconut, through effects such as sudden heat and pressure shock waves created when water inside the plant flashes to steam. This can rupture stems and scorch any plant parts.

Ozone, a gas, causes injury to leaves at concentrations from as little as 0.1 part per million in the atmosphere, such as may be found in or near large cities. It is one of many pollutant chemicals that can damage plants.

== Plant responses ==
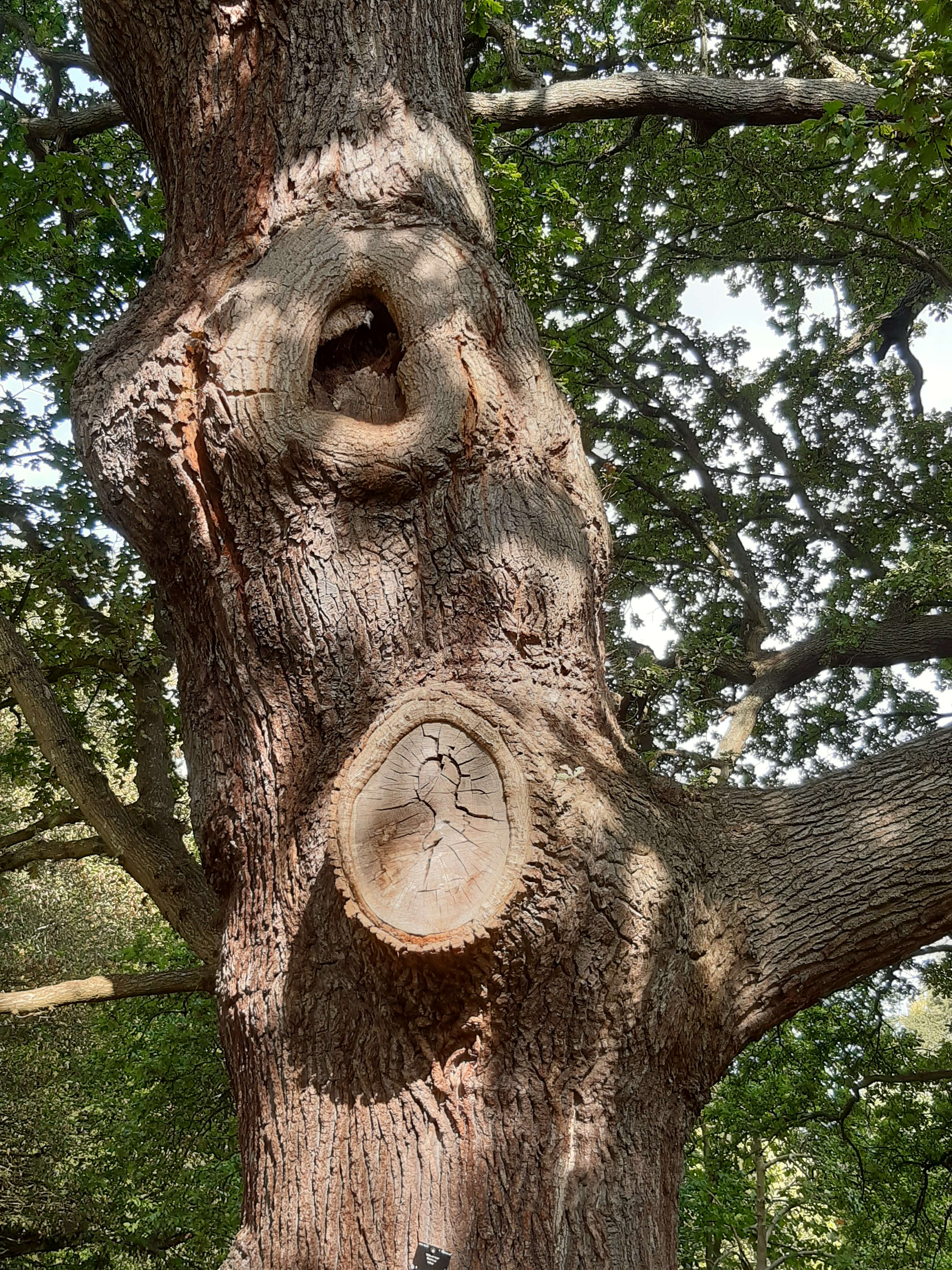
Wound healing in Quercus robur. Two branches, cut at different times, have regrown branch collars, but the wood inside has become wet and is being rotted by fungi.

Plants respond to injury by signalling that damage has occurred, by secreting materials to seal off the damaged area, by producing antimicrobials to limit the spread of pathogens, and in some woody plants by regrowing over the wound.

=== Signalling ===
Plants produce chemicals at the injury site that signal the presence of damage and may help to reduce further damage. The chemicals involved depend to some extent on the plant species, though several of them are shared among species; and the signals given depend on the cause of the injury. Plants injured by spider mites release volatile chemicals that attract predatory mites, serving to reduce the attack on the plants. As another example, maize plants damaged by the caterpillars of noctuid moths release a mixture of terpenoid substances which attract the parasitoid wasp Cotesia marginiventris, which kills caterpillars. Many plants give off such herbivory-induced signals.

=== Wound occlusion ===
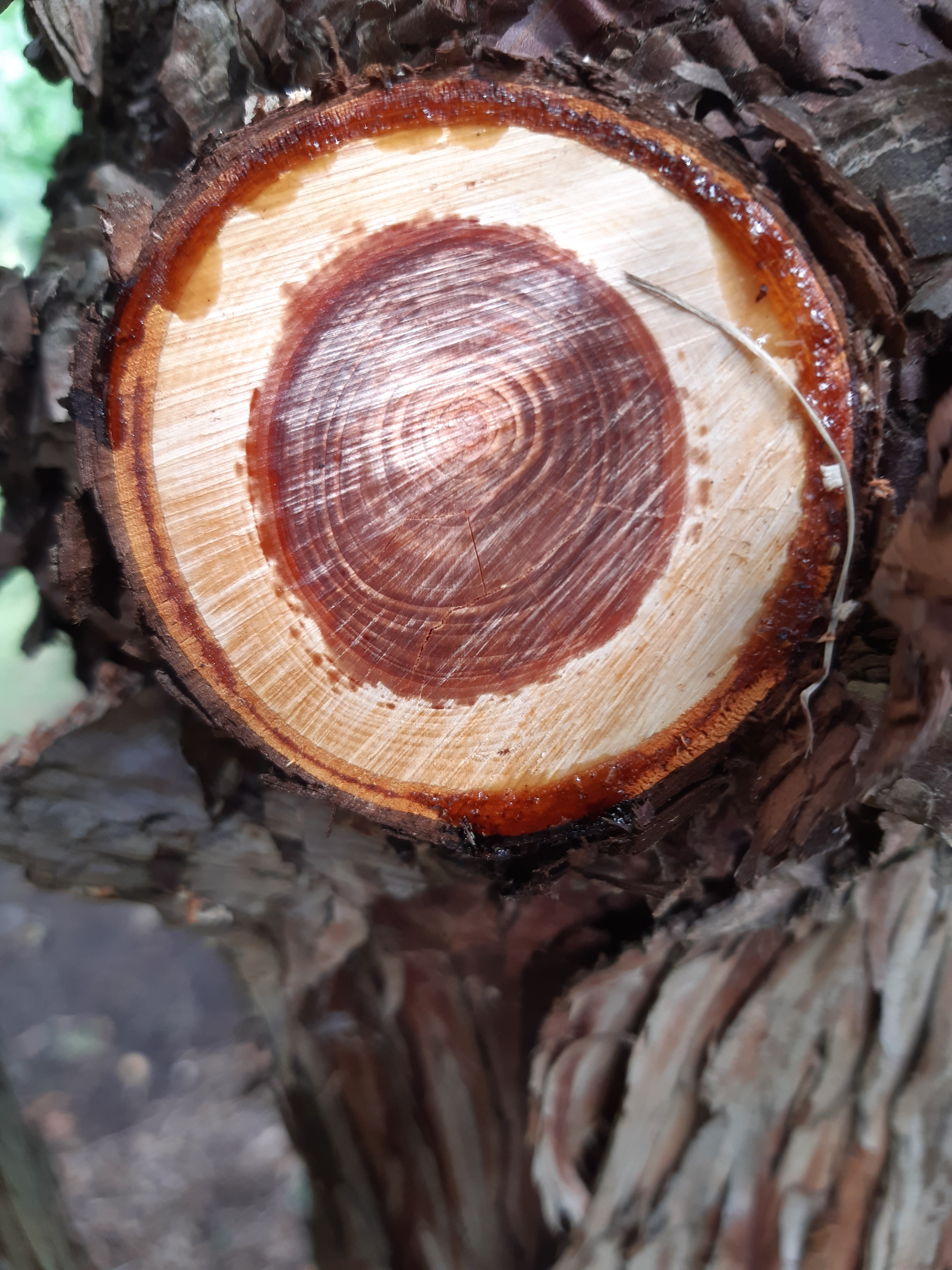
Hinoki cypress scar of cut branch, secreting resin in response to the injury

Plants secrete a variety of chemicals to help seal off damaged areas. For example, the grape vine Vitis vinifera is able to block the xylem water-transport tubes in its stems using the chemical tylose in summertime, and gels in wintertime when the plant is dormant. Tylose helps to prevent pathogens such as wood-rotting fungi and the bacterium Xylella fastidiosa from spreading through the plant: the chemical is produced as a response both to the bacterium and to mechanical damage such as viticultural pruning.

=== Chemical defence ===
Many woody plants produce resins and antimicrobial chemicals to limit the spread of pathogens after an injury.

=== Wound healing ===
Many woody plants regrow around injuries, such as those caused by pruning. In time, such regrowth often completely covers the damaged area as the cambium growth layer produces new tissues. Well-pruned trees with undamaged branch collars often recover well, where poorly-pruned trees rot below the wound.

== See also ==
- Injury in animals
