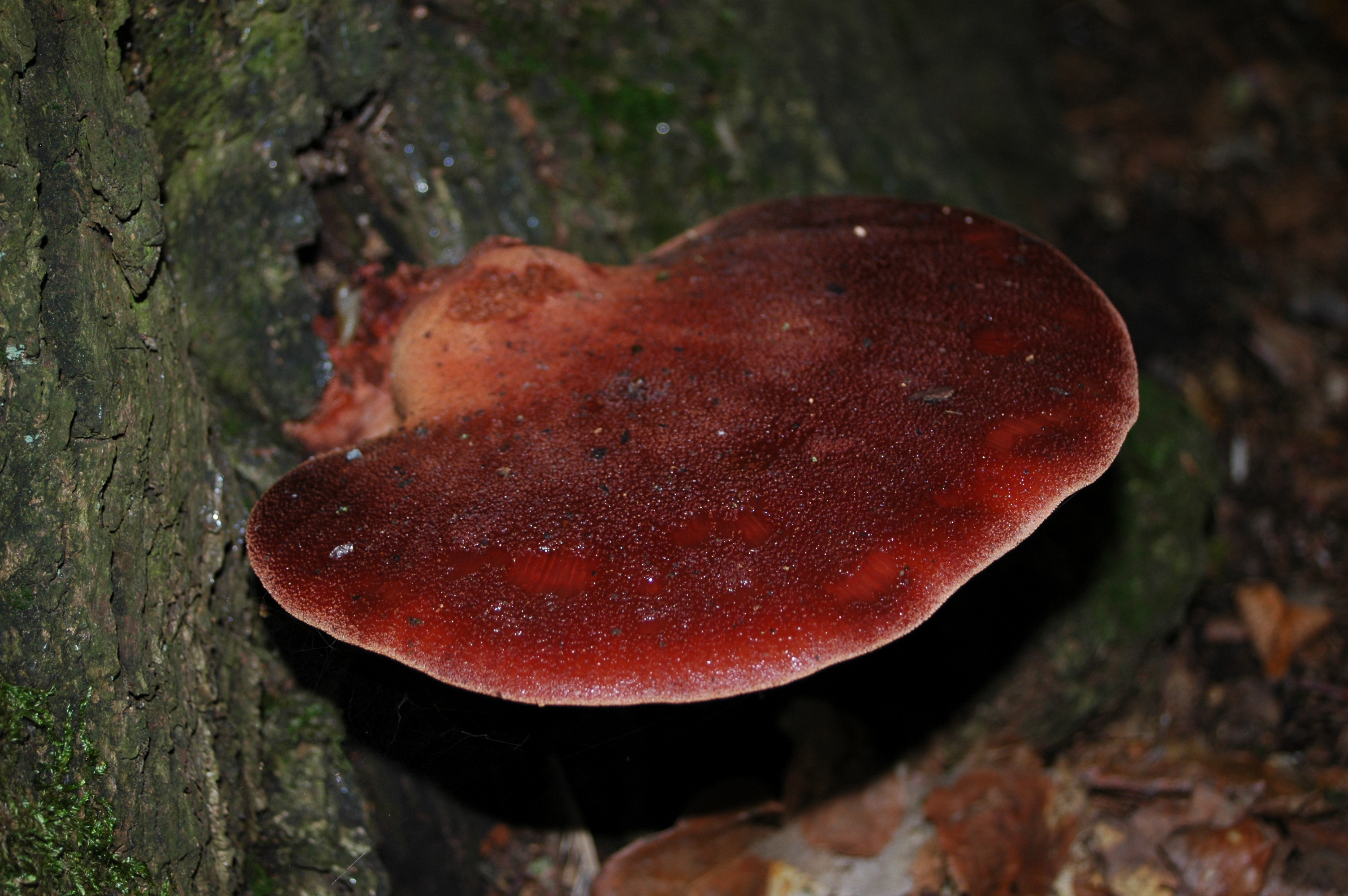
- beef steak fungus
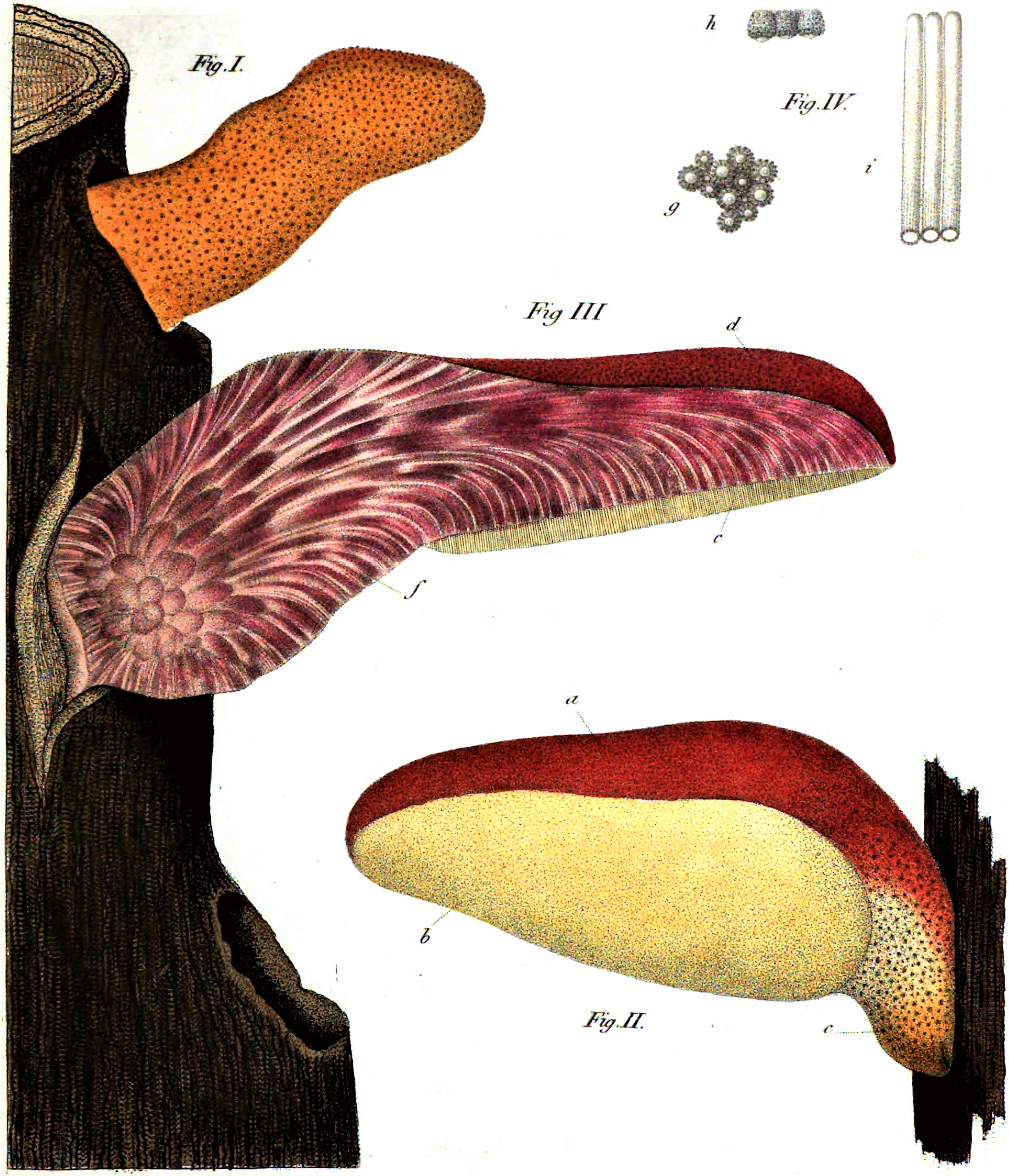
- 1835 illustration

Scientific classification
- Kingdom: Fungi
- Division: Basidiomycota
- Class: Agaricomycetes
- Order: Agaricales
- Family: Fistulinaceae
- Genus: Fistulina
- Species: F. hepatica

Binomial name
- Fistulina hepatica (Schaeff.) With. (1792)

Synonyms
- Boletus hepaticus Schaeff. (1774); Fistulina buglossoides Bull. (1790); Boletus hepaticus Vent. (1812); Hypodrys hepaticus (Schaeff.) Pers. (1825)

= Fistulina hepatica =

Species of fungus

Fistulina hepatica
- Mycological characteristics
- Pores on hymenium
- Cap is flat or offset
- Hymenium is decurrent
- Stipe is bare
- Spore print is pink
- Ecology is parasitic
- Edibility is edible or choice

Fistulina hepatica, commonly known as the beefsteak fungus, beefsteak polypore, poor man's steak, ox tongue, or tongue mushroom, is a bracket fungus classified in the Agaricales. As its common names suggest, it visually resembles a slab of meat.

The species can be found in Europe, Africa, Australia, and North America. It is edible when cooked, although older specimens may need special preparation.

== Taxonomy ==
Fistulina is classified in the family Fistulinaceae; molecular studies suggest close relations to the agaric mushroom Schizophyllum in the Schizophyllaceae (in the schizophylloid clade), but in the separate sister fistulinoid clade. Fistulina is a cyphelloid genus, meaning that it is closely related to gilled fungi, but its fertile surface consists of smooth cup-shaped elements instead of gills. The underside (the hymenium) is a mass of tubules which represent a "reduced" form of the ancestral gills.

=== Etymology ===
The genus name is a diminutive of the Latin word fistula and means "small tube", whilst the species name hepatica means "liver-like", referring to the consistency of the flesh.

== Description ==
The cap is 7–30 centimetres (3–12 in) wide and 2–6 cm (3/4–2 1/4 in) thick. Its shape resembles a large tongue and it is rough-surfaced. It is pinkish-red when young, darkening to reddish-brown with age. The stem, if present, is up to 5 cm (2 in) long and 4 cm wide. The hymenium is creamy-white. The flesh bleeds a dull red juice when cut, which can cause stains. The cut flesh itself resembles meat. It is sour in taste. The spores are pink and the spore print pinkish.

=== Similar species ===
Lookalikes include Pseudofistulina radicata, Amylocystis lapponica, Ischnoderma resinosum, Leptoporus mollis, and Rhodofomes cajanderi.

== Distribution and habitat ==
The species is commonly seen in Britain and the rest of Europe from July to October, but can also be found in North America, Australia, North Africa, and Southern Africa.

It is fairly common, and can often be found on oaks and sweet chestnut, from August to the end of autumn, on either living or dead wood. It has a tendency to impart a reddish-brown stain to the living wood of oaks, creating a desirable timber type. In Australia, it can be found growing from wounds on Eucalyptus trees. It causes a brown rot on the trees which it infects.

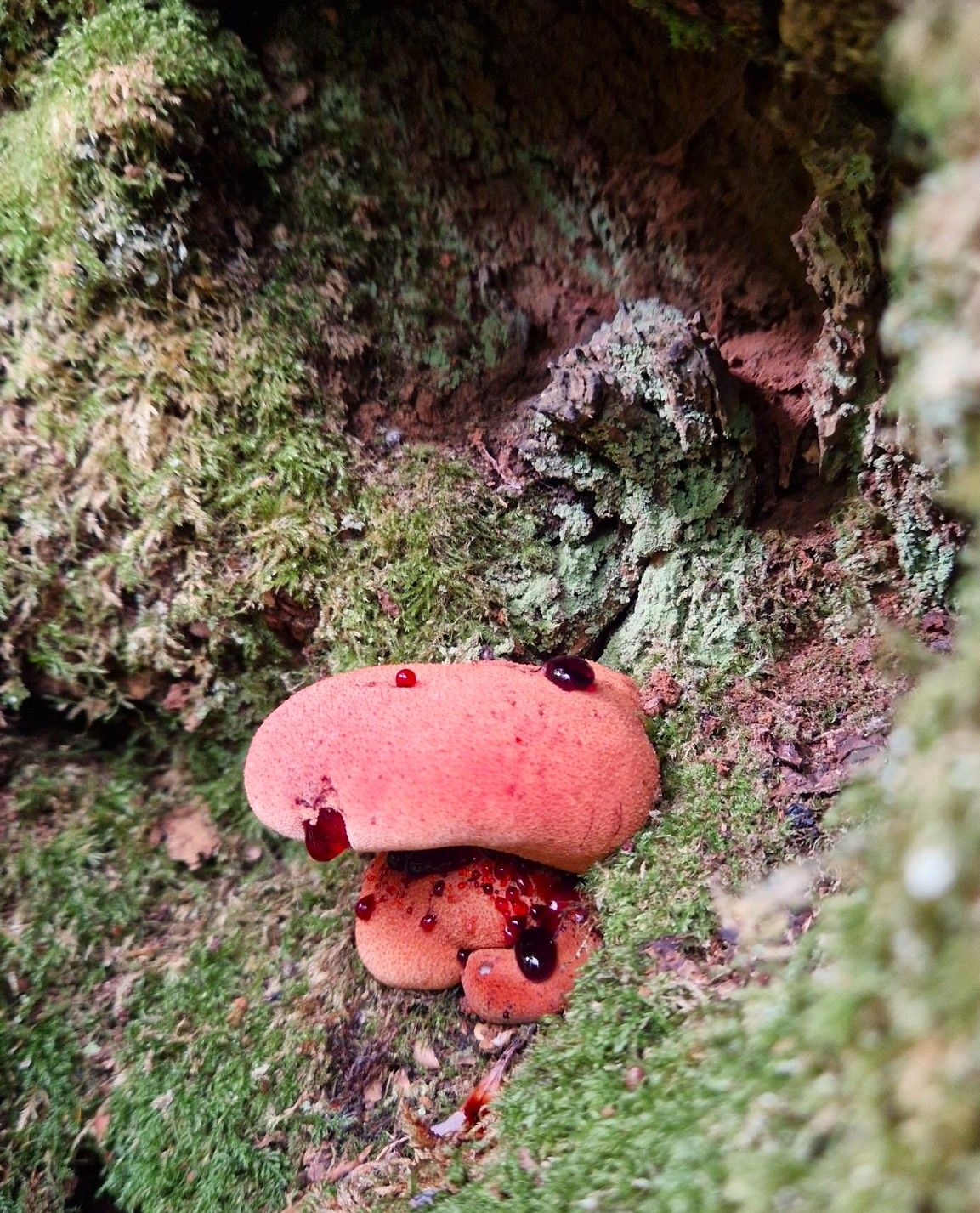
Fistulina hepatica growing on a decaying oak trunk. The specimen shows prominent red guttation droplets, a characteristic feature of young, actively growing fruit bodies.

== Uses ==
It is edible and considered "reminiscent of raw meat" in texture by some, although older specimens should be soaked overnight, as their juice can cause gastric upset. It does not tend to preserve well.

== See also ==
- Forest pathology
- List of meat substitutes
