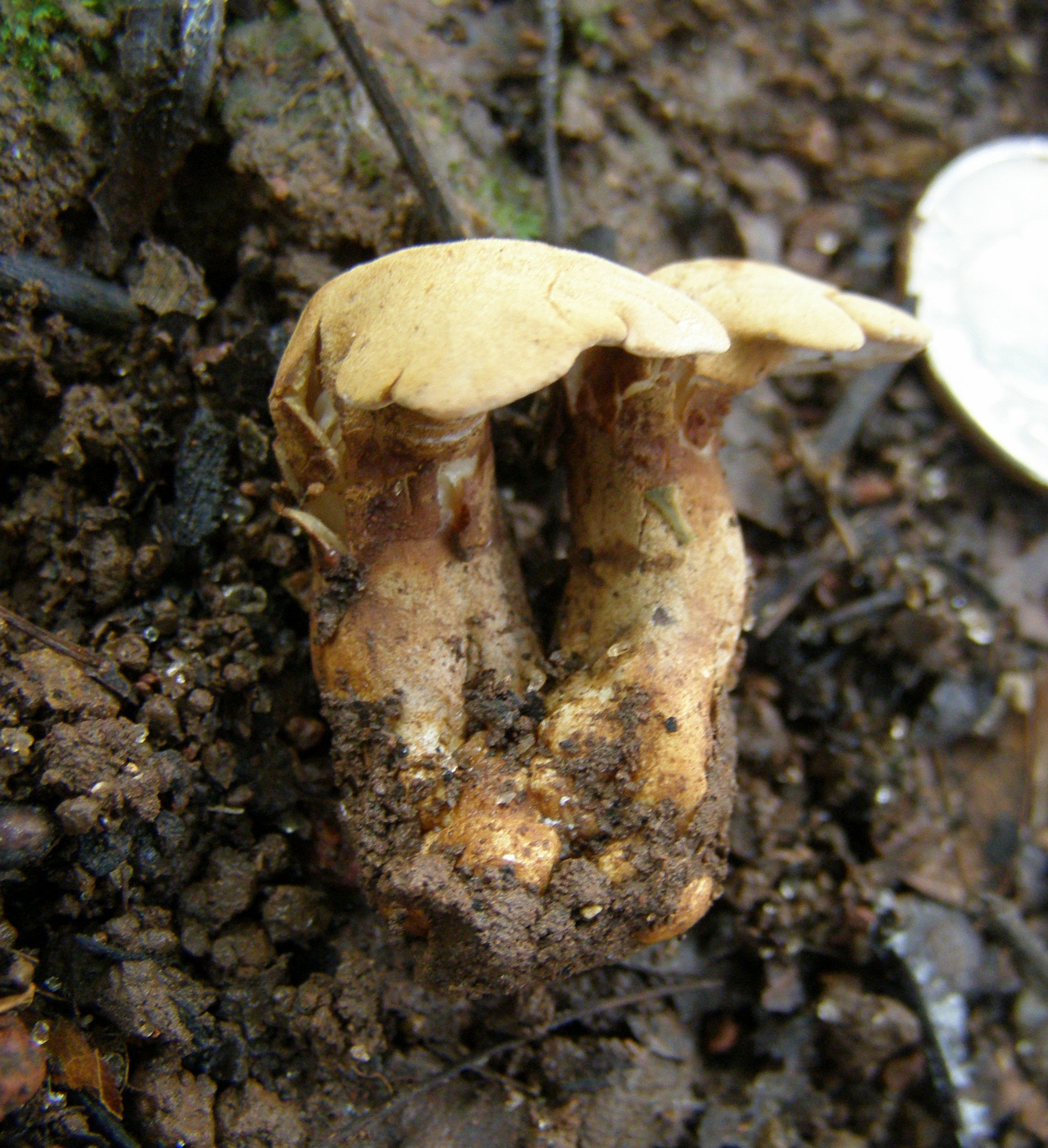
- Pseudofistulina radicata

Scientific classification
- Domain: Eukaryota
- Kingdom: Fungi
- Division: Basidiomycota
- Class: Agaricomycetes
- Order: Agaricales
- Family: Fistulinaceae
- Genus: Pseudofistulina; O.Fidalgo & M.Fidalgo (1963)

Type species
- Fistulina brasiliensis O.Fidalgo & M.Fidalgo (1963)

Species
- Pseudofistulina radicata Pseudofistulina sinensis

= Pseudofistulina =

Genus of fungi

Pseudofistulina is a genus of fungi in the family Fistulinaceae. It was circumscribed in 1962 by Oswaldo and Maria Fidalgo.
