= Injury in animals =

Wound caused by an external source

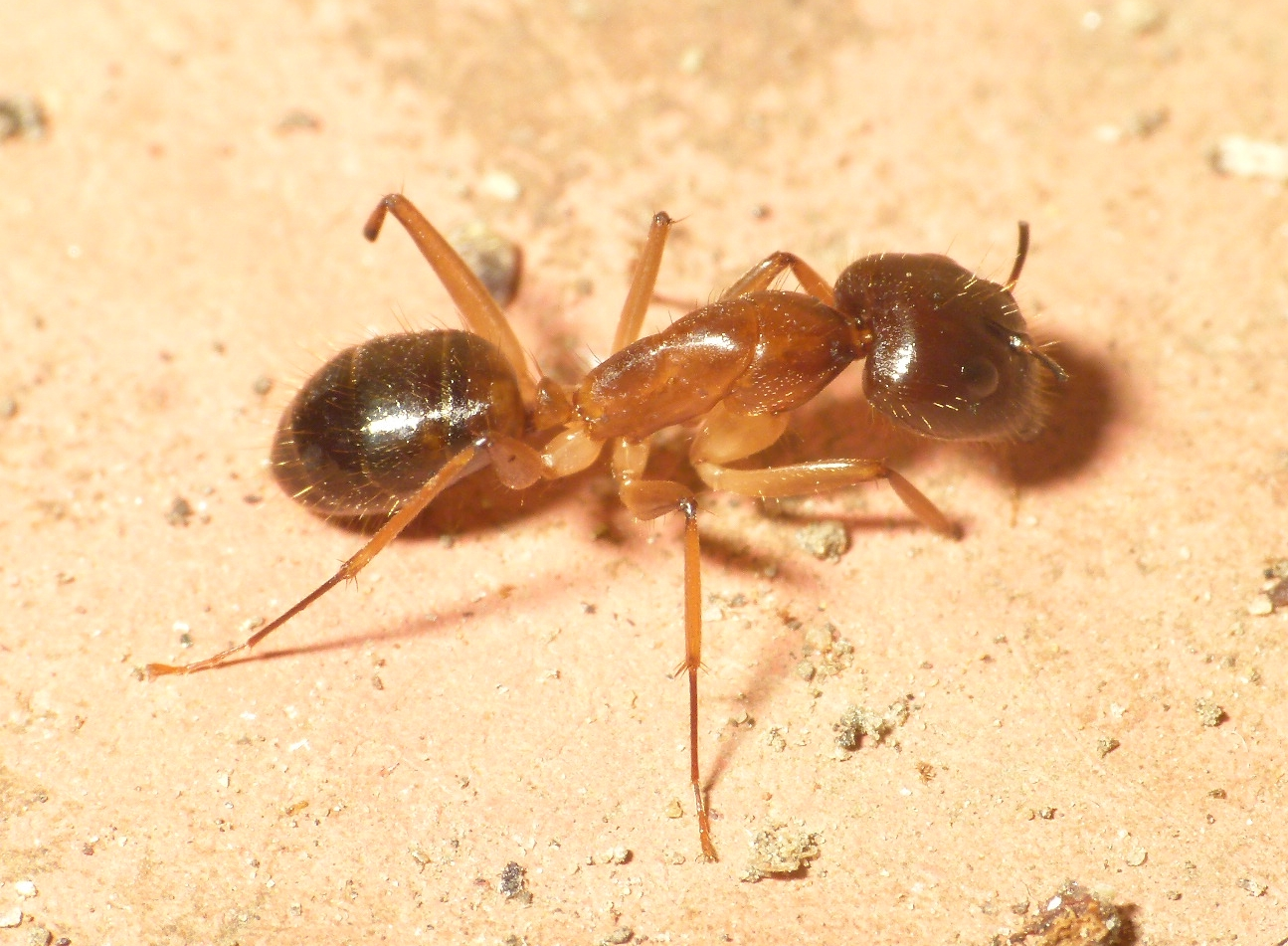
A Camponotus ant that has been injured in a fight with other ants

Injury in animals is damage to the body caused by wounding, change in pressure, heat or cold, chemical substances, venoms and biotoxins. Injury prompts an inflammatory response in many taxa of animals; this prompts wound healing, which may be rapid, as in the Cnidaria.

== Causes ==
Injuries to animals including humans can be caused by wounding, change in pressure, heat or cold, chemical substances, venoms and biotoxins. Such damage may result from attempted predation, territorial fights, falls, and abiotic factors.

Human activities such as trawling can cause wound injury to a high proportion of seabed invertebrates; a study of a Nephrops lobster fishery found that all the discarded Ophiura ophiura brittlestars were injured, along with 57% of the Munida rugosa squat lobsters and 56% of the Astropecten irregularis starfish. Species with stronger shells such as scallops were less often injured. A study of beam trawling in contrast found survival rates over 75% for bottom-living invertebrates.

== Effects ==
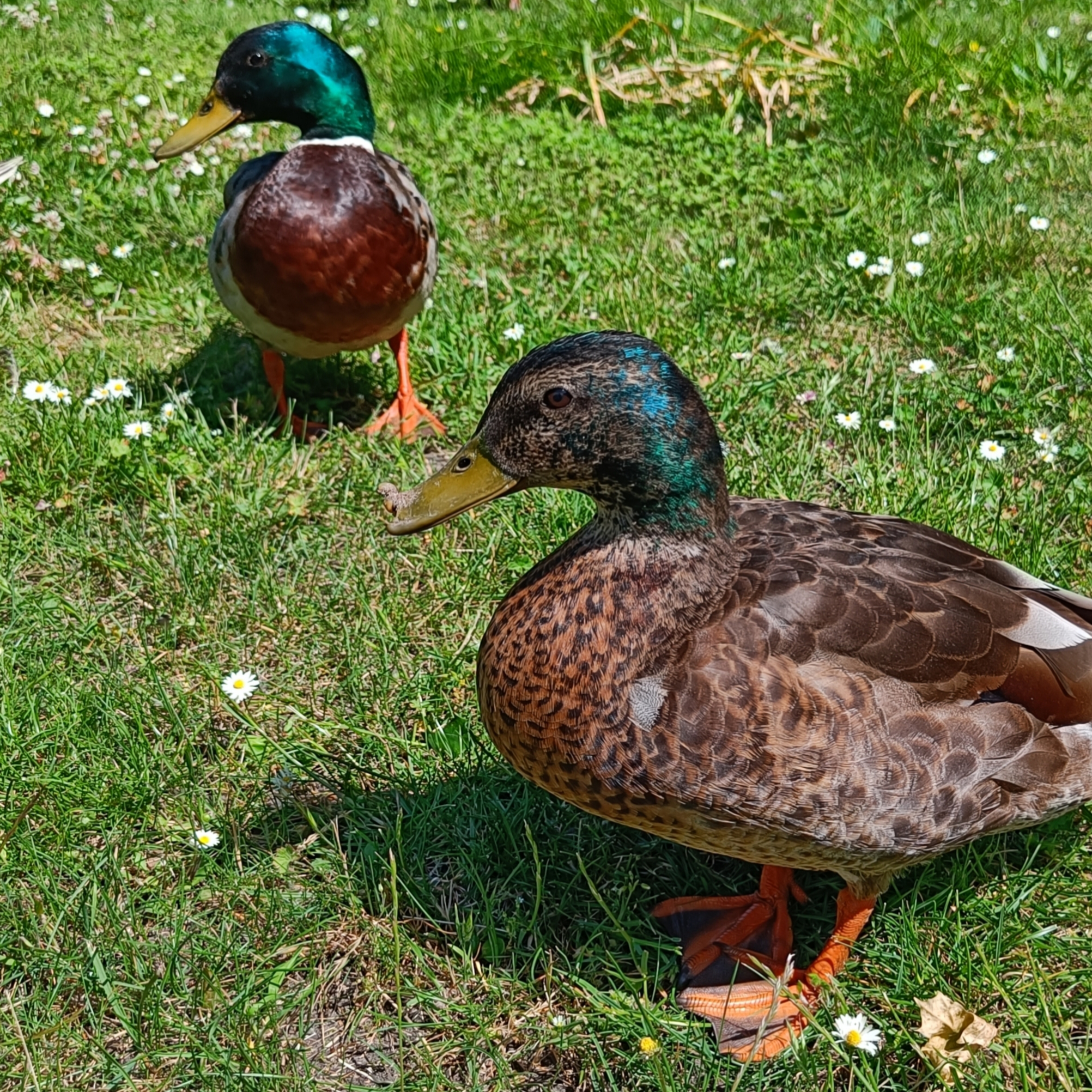
Mallard with an injured beak three weeks after a dog attack. The outer keratin layer of his beak has partly regenerated.

Injury causes multiple effects at different biological levels from molecular and cellular to physiological, organismal, behavioural, and ecological. These include such harmful effects as direct damage to cells and tissues; loss of energy reserves; stress responses and changes to immune function; defensive behaviour; and reduced ability to move, feed, reproduce, and compete. In addition, injury sets off a chain of responses that tend to restore structure and function.

=== Immune responses ===
The tissues of many animals respond to injury with inflammation, resulting in repair of the wound. Inflammation occurs in many taxa, but the nature of the response varies widely. In Hydra, a cnidarian, damage to the area around the mouth is fully healed within 20 minutes.

Animals in several phyla, including annelids, arthropods, cnidaria, molluscs, nematodes, and vertebrates are able to produce antimicrobial peptides to fight off infection following an injury.

=== Wound occlusion ===
Many animals are able to block off the area around an injury rapidly, by coagulating their blood or body fluid. Invertebrates with hydrostatic skeletons (moving by peristalsis) are unable to move without internal fluid under pressure, while those with an open circulation (body fluid not confined to blood vessels) quickly die from loss of body fluid. In addition, open wounds allow bacteria to enter the body. The invertebrate coagulation system is comparable with the innate immune system (the simpler of two systems of protection against infection) of vertebrates.

=== Wound healing ===
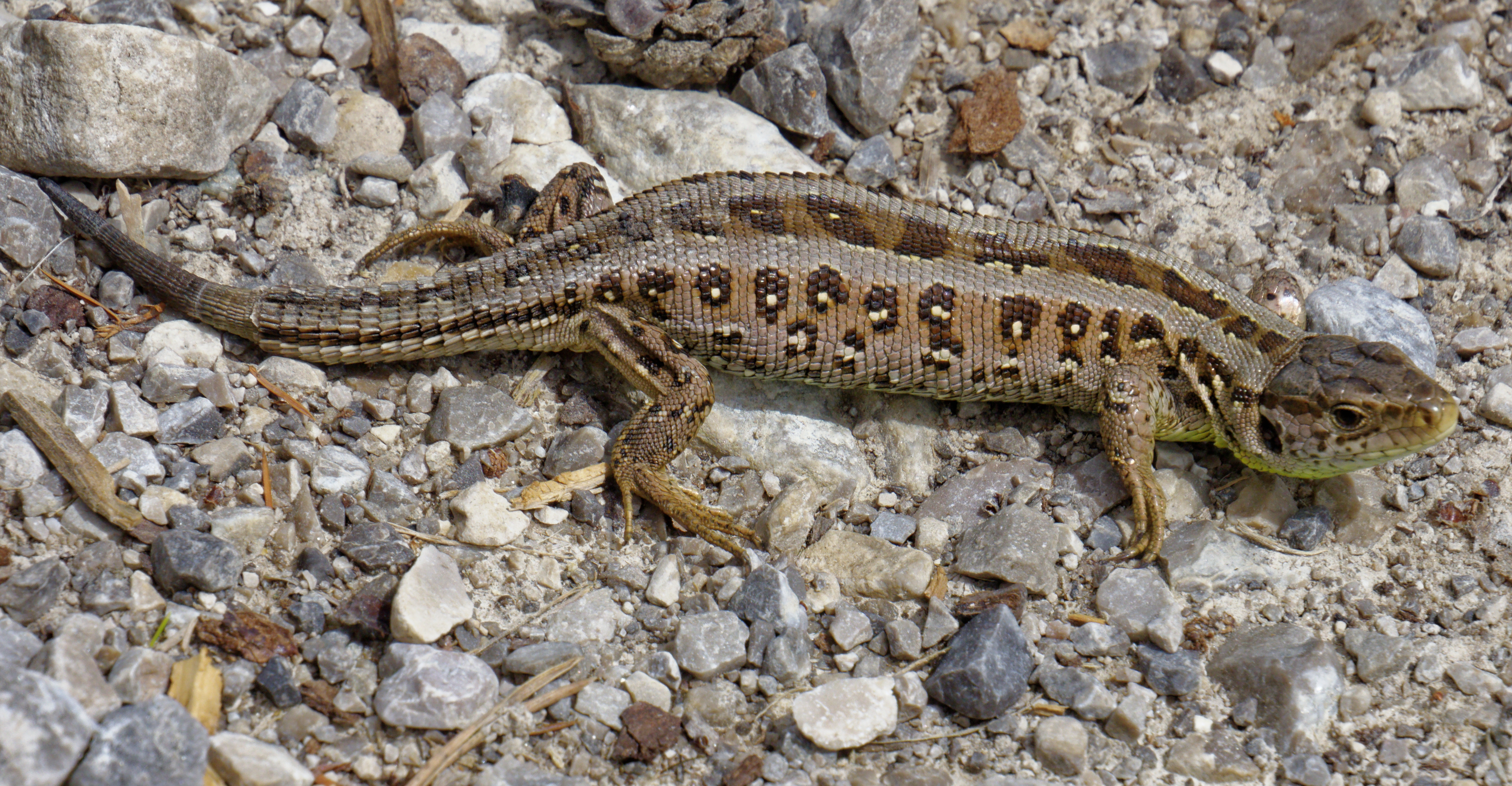
A sand lizard that has shed its tail when attacked by a predator, and has started to regrow a tail from the site of the injury

In arthropods such as insects, wound healing following injury and coagulation of body fluid involves a process of melanisation of the scab, migration of cells to the scab area, and a degree of repair of the cuticle (which serves as an exoskeleton), in locusts restoring it to 2/3 of its original strength.

Several vertebrates including lizards and salamanders shed their tails (autotomy) when attacked by a predator, especially if the tail is grasped, giving the animal a chance to escape. The tail is at least partially regrown over a period of weeks or months.

=== Effects on behaviour ===
Octopuses such as Abdopus aculeatus can survive the loss of an arm (tentacle) but suffer long-term behavioural changes and hypersensitivity afterwards. The species makes use of autotomy, the self-amputation of an arm, as an anti-predator defence. Crush injury to an arm caused the animals to eject ink, to squirt a jet of water, to groom the wound, and later to retract the injured arm and guard it with other arms.

== See also ==
- Injury in plants

== Sources ==
- Sparks, Albert (1972). Invertebrate Pathology Noncommunicable Diseases. Academic Press. ISBN 978-0-323-15196-2.
