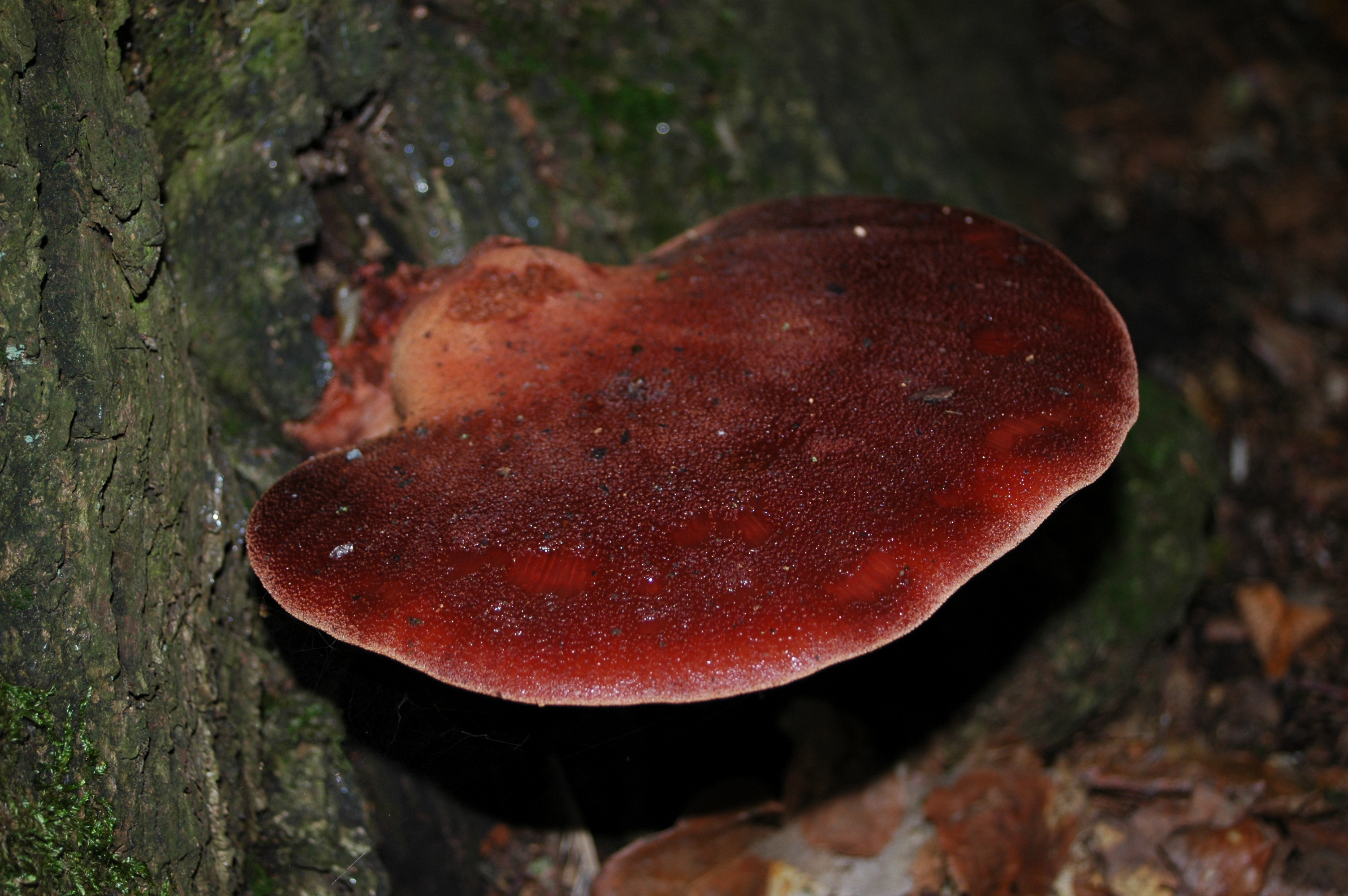
- Fistulina hepatica

Scientific classification
- Kingdom: Fungi
- Division: Basidiomycota
- Class: Agaricomycetes
- Order: Agaricales
- Family: Fistulinaceae
- Genus: Fistulina; Bull. (1791)

Type species
- Fistulina hepatica (Schaeffer) With. (1792)

Synonyms
- Agarico-carnis Paulet (1793); Buglossus Wahlenb. (1820); Hypodrys Pers. (1825)

= Fistulina =

Genus of fungi

Fistulina is a genus of fungi in the family Fistulinaceae. Species in the genus cause a brown rot of both dead and living hardwood trees.

== Species ==
The following species are assigned to this genus:

- Fistulina africana Van der Byl
- Fistulina americana Y.C. Dai, D.W. Li & Meng Zhou
- Fistulina antarctica Speg.
- Fistulina brasiliensis O. Fidalgo & M. Fidalgo
- Fistulina firma Peck
- Fistulina guzmanii Brusis
- Fistulina hepatica (Schaeff.) With.
- Fistulina orientalis Y.C. Dai, D.P. Bao & Y.W. Lim
- Fistulina pallida Berk. & Ravenel
- Fistulina pectinata (Huds.) With.
- Fistulina pumiliae G.C. González, Barroetaveña & Pildain
- Fistulina spiculifera (Cooke) D.A. Reid
- Fistulina subhepatica B.K. Cui & J. Song
- Fistulina tasmanica B.K. Cui & Y.F. Sun

== See also ==
- List of Agaricales genera
