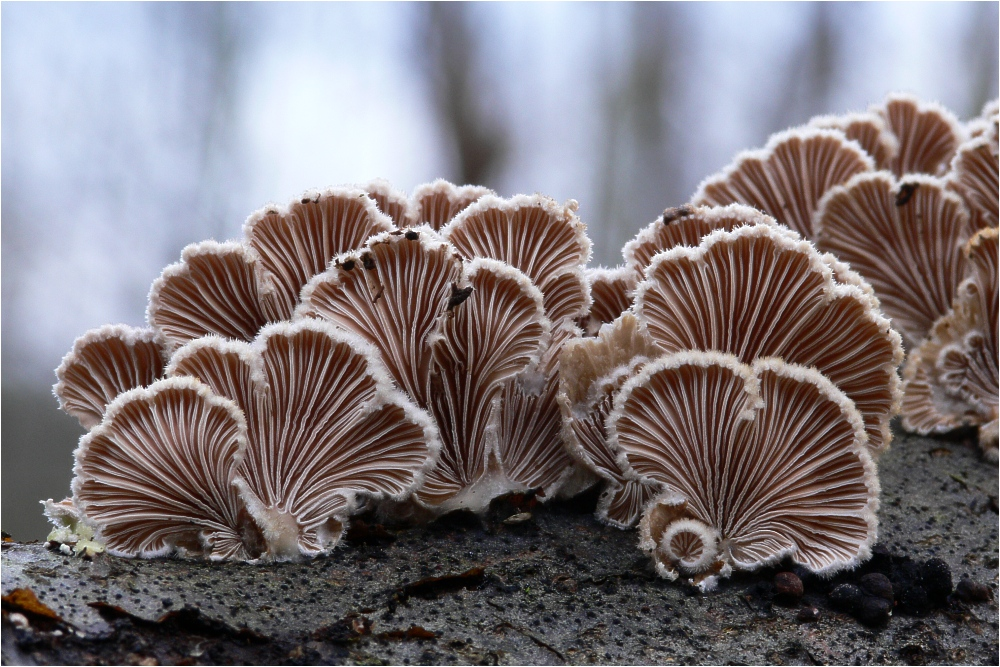
- Schizophyllum commune

Scientific classification
- Kingdom: Fungi
- Division: Basidiomycota
- Class: Agaricomycetes
- Order: Agaricales
- Family: Schizophyllaceae
- Genus: Schizophyllum; Fr. (1815)

Type species
- Schizophyllum commune (as Schizophyllus communis) Fr. (1815)

Species
- Schizophyllum amplum Schizophyllum commune Schizophyllum fasciatum Schizophyllum murrayi Schizophyllum radiatum Schizophyllum variabile

= Schizophyllum =

Genus of fungi

Schizophyllum is a genus of fungi in the family Schizophyllaceae. The widespread genus contains six wood-rotting species.
