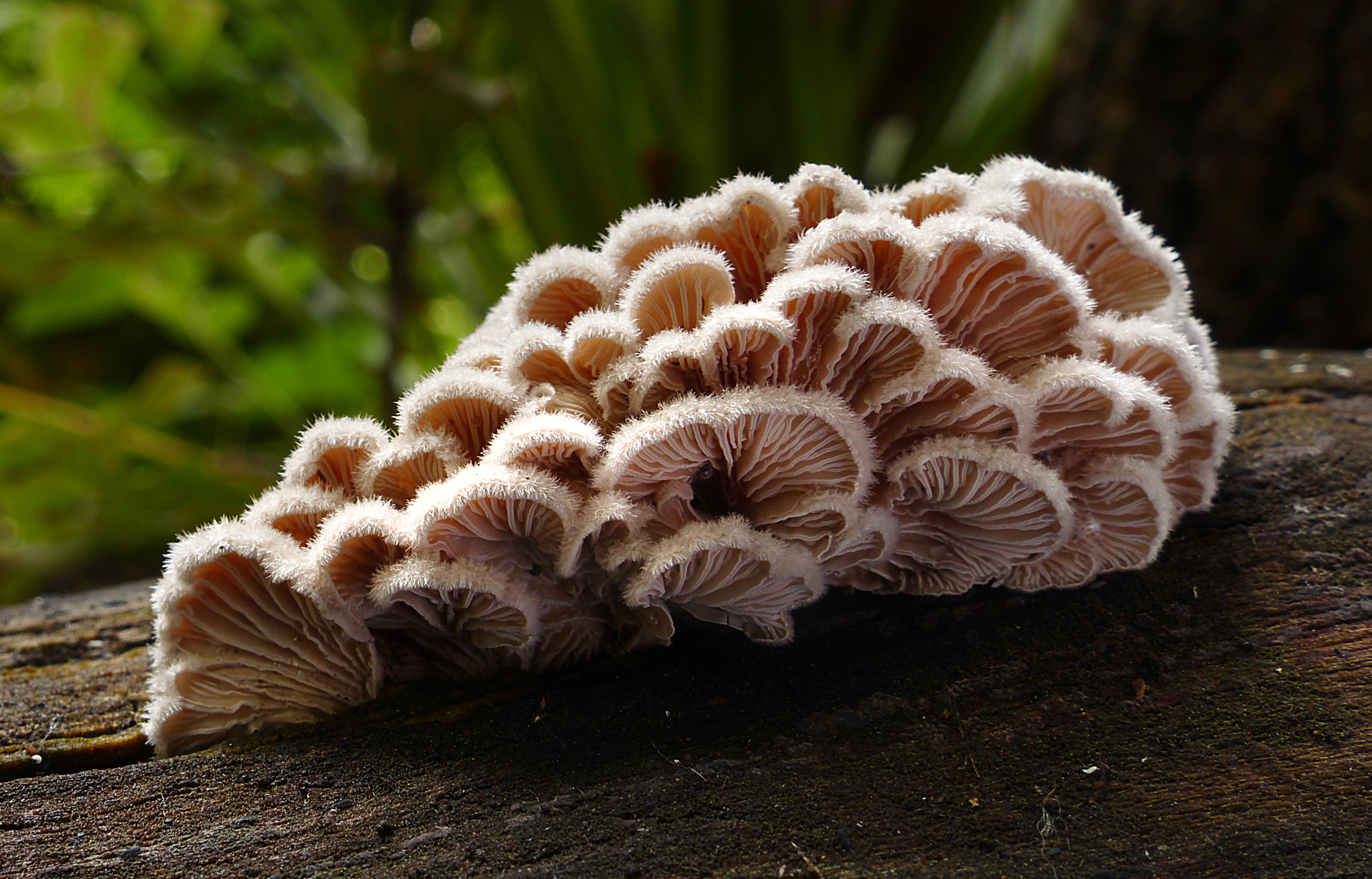

Scientific classification
- Kingdom: Fungi
- Division: Basidiomycota
- Class: Agaricomycetes
- Order: Agaricales
- Family: Schizophyllaceae
- Genus: Schizophyllum
- Species: S. commune

Binomial name
- Schizophyllum commune Fr. (1815)

Synonyms
- Agaricus alneus L. (1755); Agaricus alneus Reichard (1780); Agaricus multifidus Batsch (1786); Apus alneus (L.) Gray (1821); Merulius alneus (L.) J.F.Gmel. (1792); Merulius alneus (Reichard) Schumach. (1803); Merulius communis (Fr.) Spirin & Zmitr. (2004); Schizophyllum alneum J.Schröt. (1889); Schizophyllum alneum (Reichard) Kuntze (1898); Schizophyllum commune var. multifidum (Batsch) Cooke (1892); Schizophyllum multifidum (Batsch) Fr. (1875)

= Schizophyllum commune =

Species of fungus

Schizophyllum commune
- Mycological characteristics
- Gills on hymenium
- No distinct cap
- Hymenium attachment is irregular or not applicable
- Lacks a stipe or is bare
- Spore print is white
- Ecology is saprotrophic or parasitic
- Edibility is edible

Schizophyllum commune is a species of fungus in the genus Schizophyllum. The mushroom resembles undulating waves of tightly packed corals or a loose Chinese fan. Gillies or split-gills vary from creamy yellow to pale white in colour. The cap is 1–4 centimetres (3/8–1 5/8 in) wide with a dense yet spongey body texture.

It is found on rotting wood throughout the world. This fungus is an opportunistic environmental pathogen.

== Etymology ==
Schizophyllum is derived from the Greek Schíza meaning split because of the appearance of radial, centrally split, gill like folds; commune means common or shared ownership or ubiquitous.

== Description ==
Schizophyllum commune is usually described as a morphological species of global distribution, but some research has suggested that it may be a species complex encompassing several cryptic species of more narrow distribution, as typical of many mushroom-forming Basidiomycota.

The caps are 1–4 centimetres (3/8–1 5/8 in) wide with white or grayish hairs. They grow in shelf-like arrangements, without stalks. The gills, which produce basidiospores on their surface, split when the mushroom dries out, earning this mushroom the common name split gill. The mushrooms can remain dry for decades and then be revived with moisture. The spore print is white.

=== Mating ===
It has a tetrapolar mating system with each cell containing two mating-type loci (called A and B) that govern different aspects of the mating process, leading to 4 possible phenotypes after cell fusion. Each locus codes for a mating type sublocus (α or β) and each type is multi-allelic: the A locus has 9 alleles for the α type and an estimated 32 for its β type, and the B locus has 9 alleles each for both its α and β types. When combined this gives an estimated $9 \times 32 \times 9 \times 9 = 23328$ potential mating type specificities. This does not mean all different mating types are compatible with one another, because compatibility between haploid individuals exists only when for both the A and the B mating-type locus at least the α or β are different. Strains are thus compatible with $\left(1 - \frac {1}{ 9 \times 32} \right) \times \left( 1 - \frac {1}{ 9 \times 9} \right) \approx 0.984 = 98.4 \%$ of the population.

While all mating types can initially fuse with any other mating type, a fertile fruit body and subsequent spores will result only if both the A and B loci of the merging cells are compatible. If neither the A nor B are compatible the result is normal monokarytic mycelium, and if only one of A or B are compatible, the result is either two mycelia growing in opposite directions (only A compatible) or a "flat" phenotype with no mycelia (only B compatible).

=== Genetics ===
The genome of Schizophyllum commune was sequenced in 2010.

== Habitat and distribution ==
It is common in rotting wood. It can be found throughout the world, year-round in places such as North America.

== Constituents ==
Hydrophobin was first isolated from S. commune. Some sources indicate that this mushroom contains antitumor and antiviral components.

== Role in Human Disease ==
While fungal infections by non-basidiomycete organisms are much more common, Schizophyllum commune may be the most commonly pathogenic basidiomycete as a number of case studies have isolated it from patients' lungs. They have also been reported to cause sinusitis and allergic reactions.

== As food ==
This mushroom is edible when young. The species was regarded as nonpoisonous by Orson K. Miller Jr. and Hope H. Miller, who like David Arora regard it as inedible due to its smallness and toughness. It is chewed by some natives of Madagascar.

=== In North America ===
It is consumed in Mexico (Oaxaca, Quintana Roo and Tabasco, which are tropical). The preference for tough, rubbery mushrooms in the tropics was explained as a consequence of the fact that tender, fleshy mushrooms quickly rot in the hot humid conditions there, making their marketing problematic.

=== In Central America ===
This mushroom is sold in markets in Guatemala.

=== In East Asia ===
Known locally in Chinese as baishen (白参), this mushroom is enjoyed as food in Yunnan, China.

=== In South Asia ===
In Northeast India, in the state Manipur, it is known as kanglayen and one of the favourite ingredients for Manipuri-style pancakes called paaknam. In Mizoram, the local name is pasi (pa means mushroom, si means tiny) and it is one of the highest rated edible mushrooms among the Mizo community.

== Gallery ==
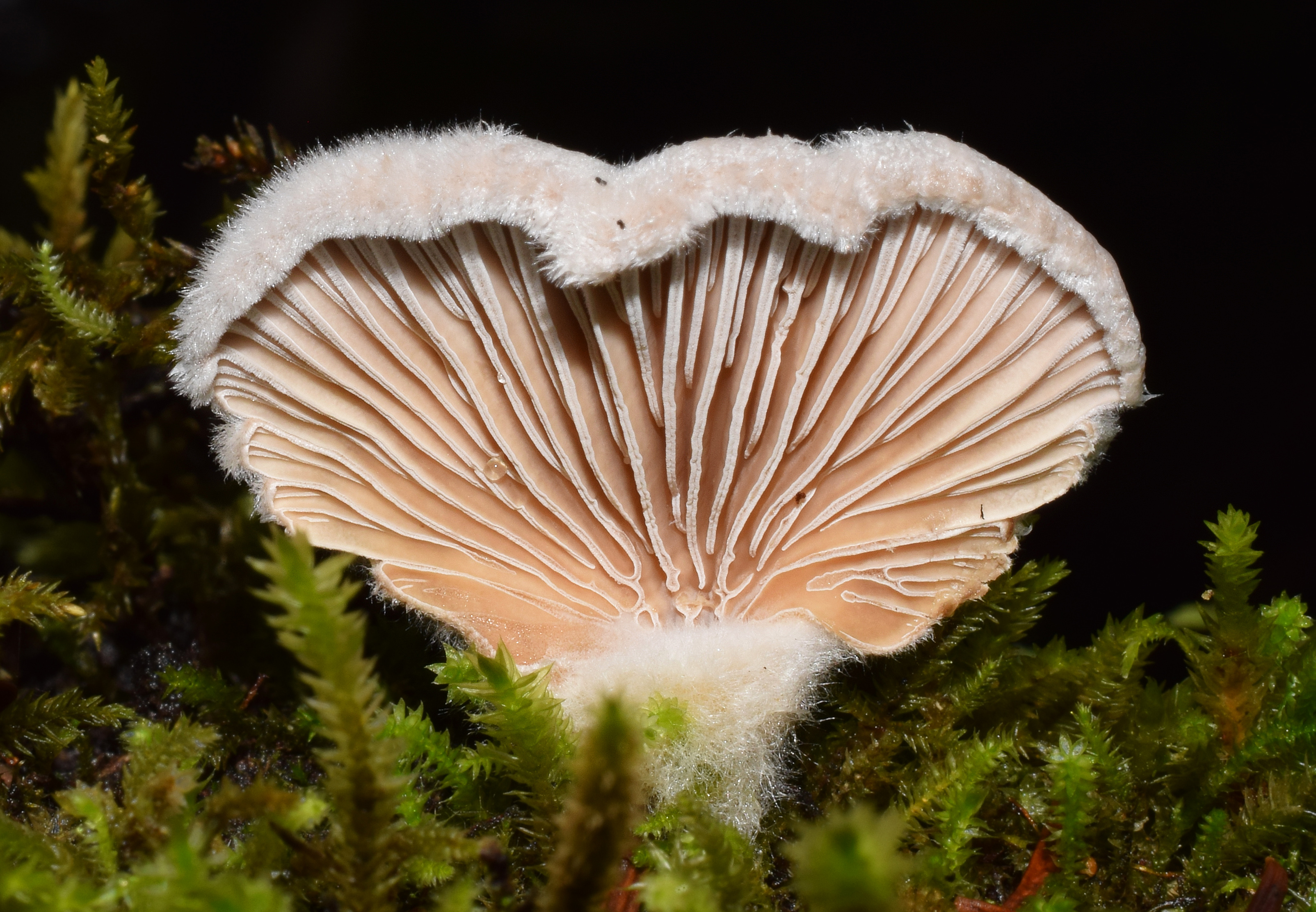
Schizophyllum commune in the Santa Cruz Mountains of California

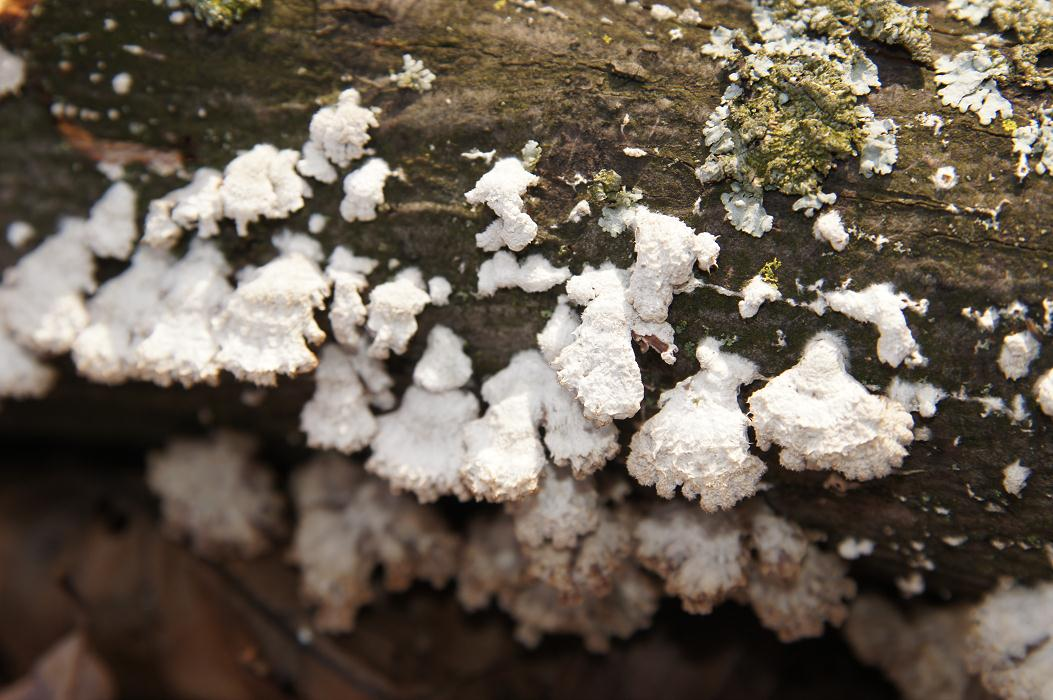
Schizophyllum commune Elk Grove, Illinois

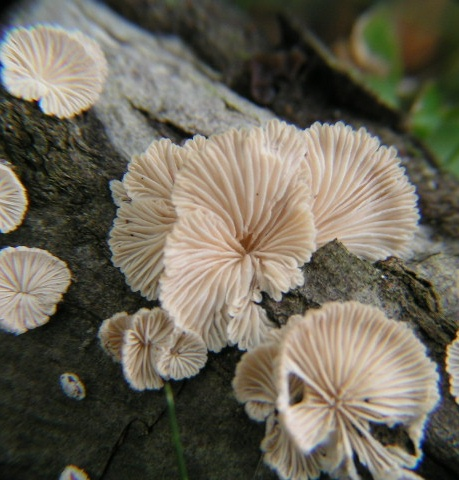
Schizophyllum commune in Missouri, US

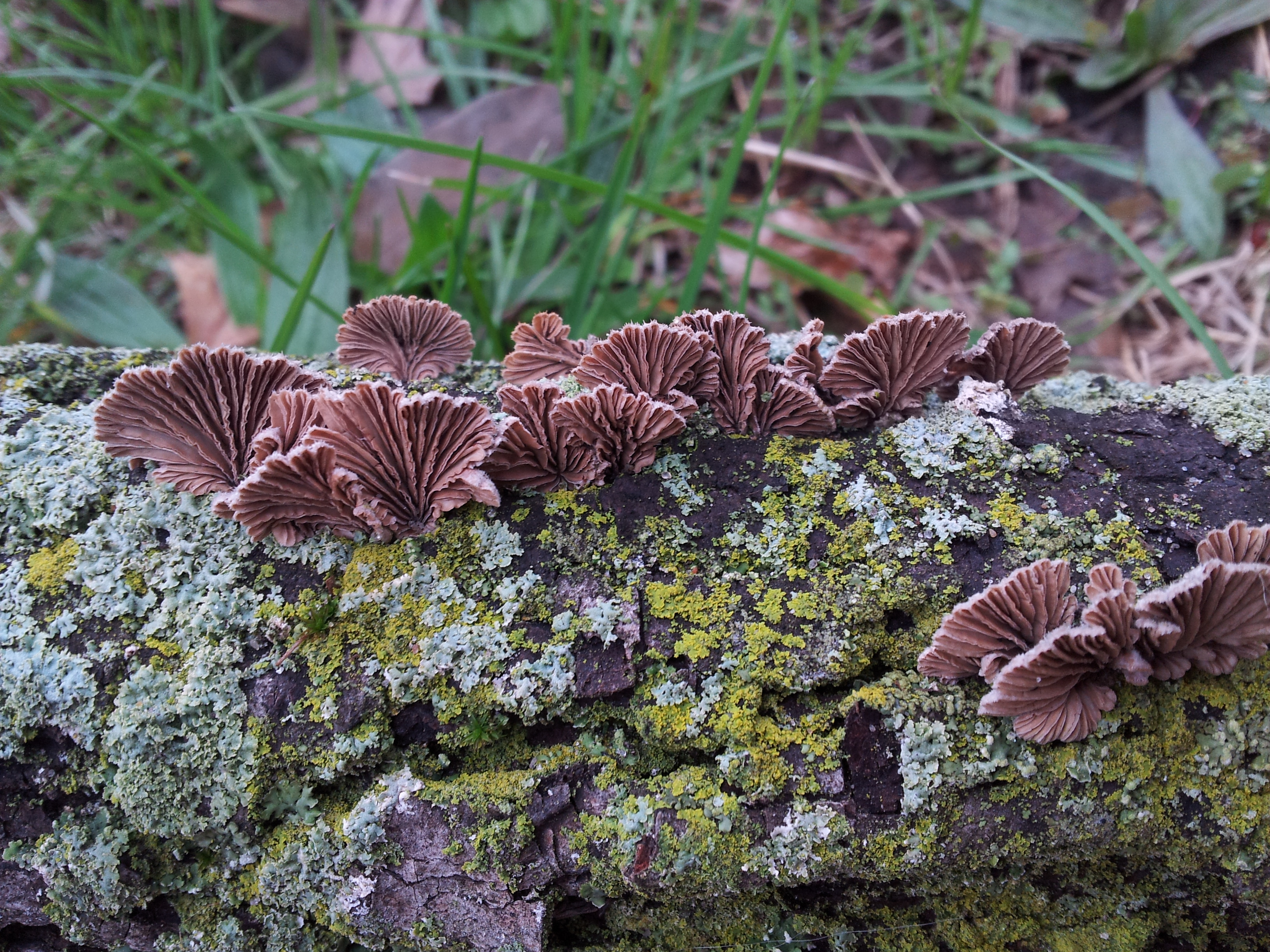
Schizophyllum commune Grand Rapids, Michigan

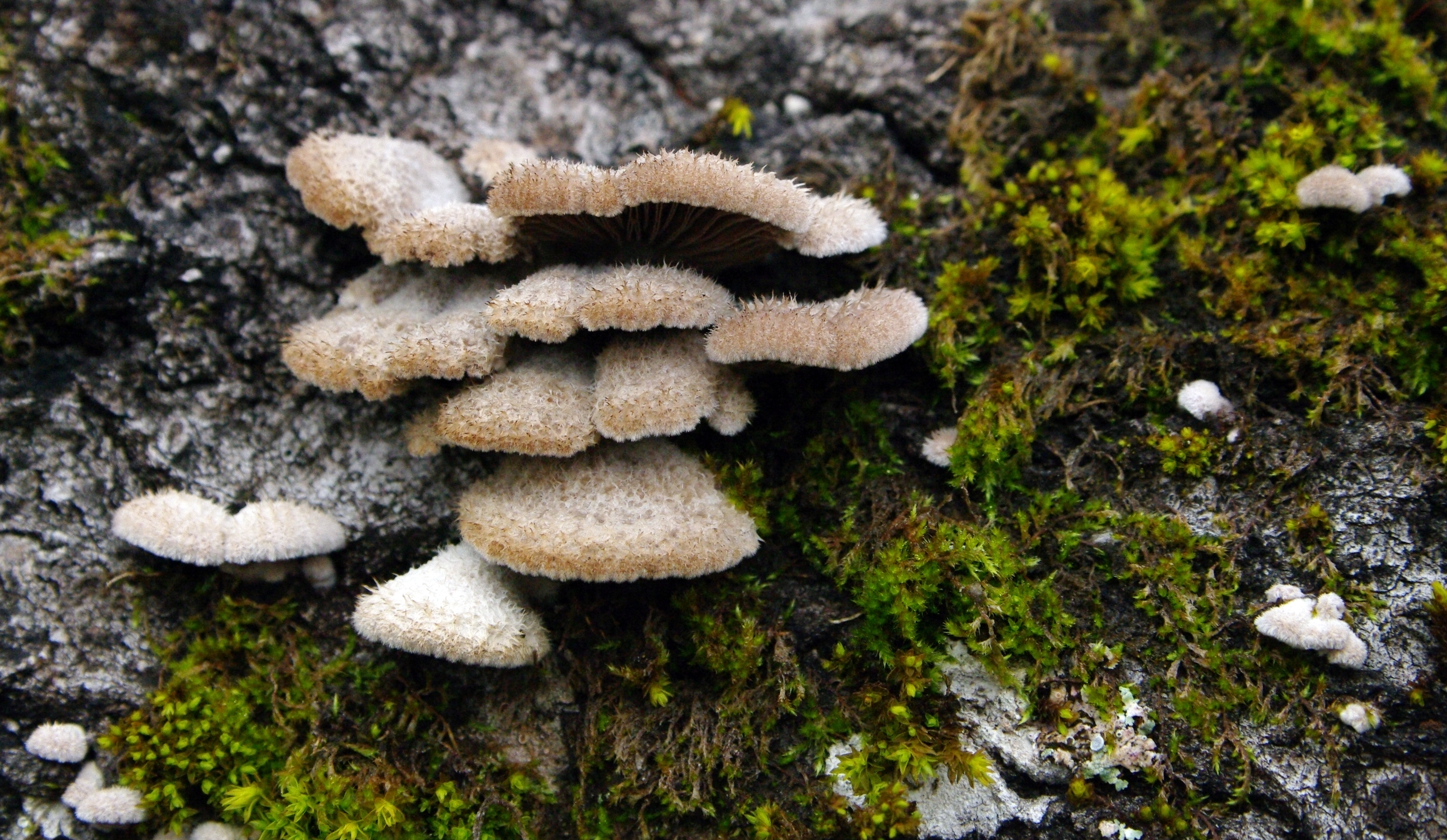
Schizophyllum commune in Estonia
