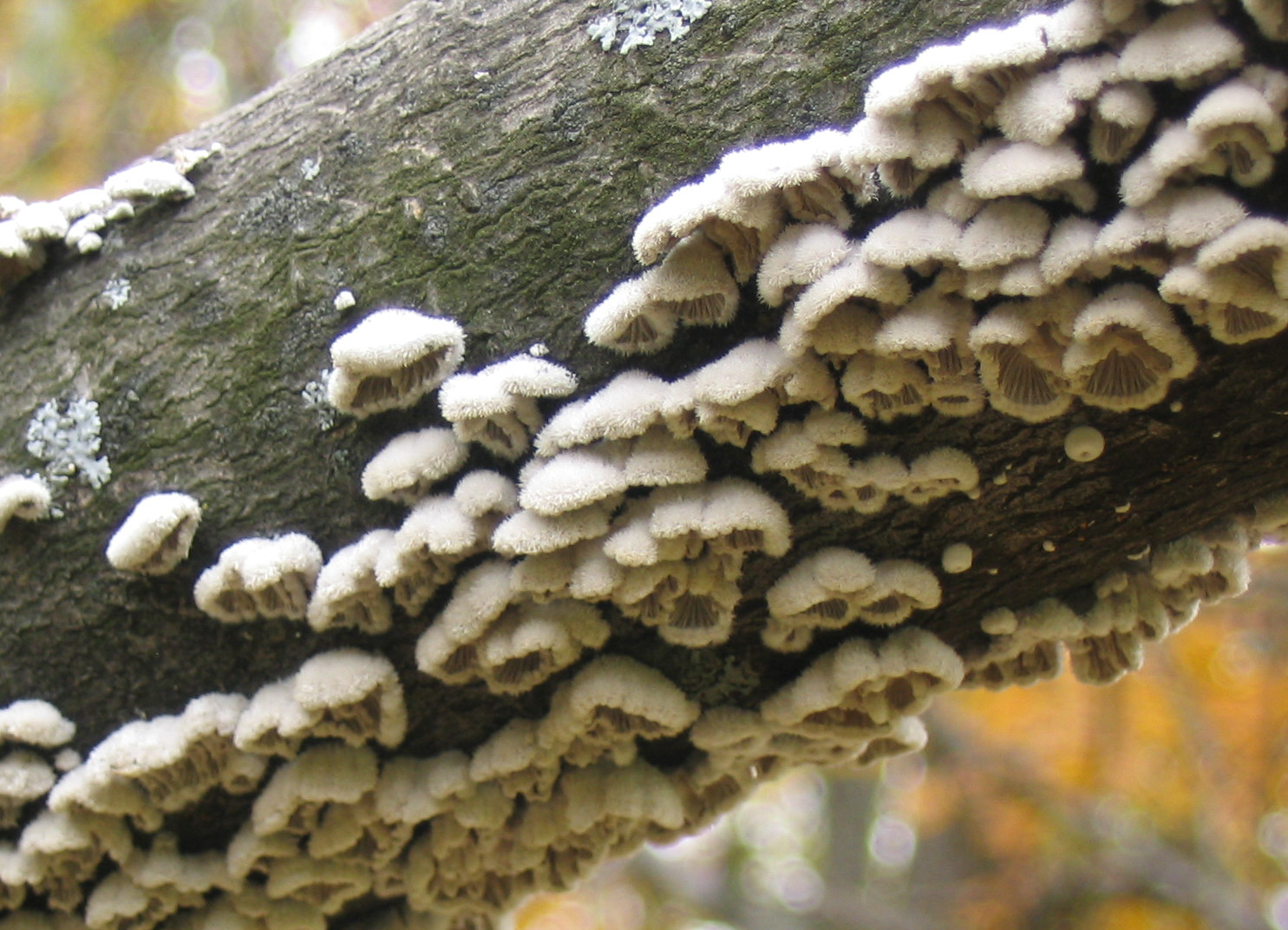
- Schizophyllum commune

Scientific classification
- Kingdom: Fungi
- Division: Basidiomycota
- Class: Agaricomycetes
- Order: Agaricales
- Family: Schizophyllaceae; Quél. (1888)

Type genus
- Schizophyllum Fr. (1815)

Genera
- Auriculariopsis; Schizophyllum

Synonyms
- Auriculariopsidaceae Jülich (1981)

= Schizophyllaceae =

Family of fungi

The Schizophyllaceae are a family of fungi in the order Agaricales. The family contains two genera and seven species. Species cause white rot in hardwoods. The most common member of the genus Schizophyllum is Schizophyllum commune, a widely distributed mushroom.

== See also ==
- List of Agaricales families
