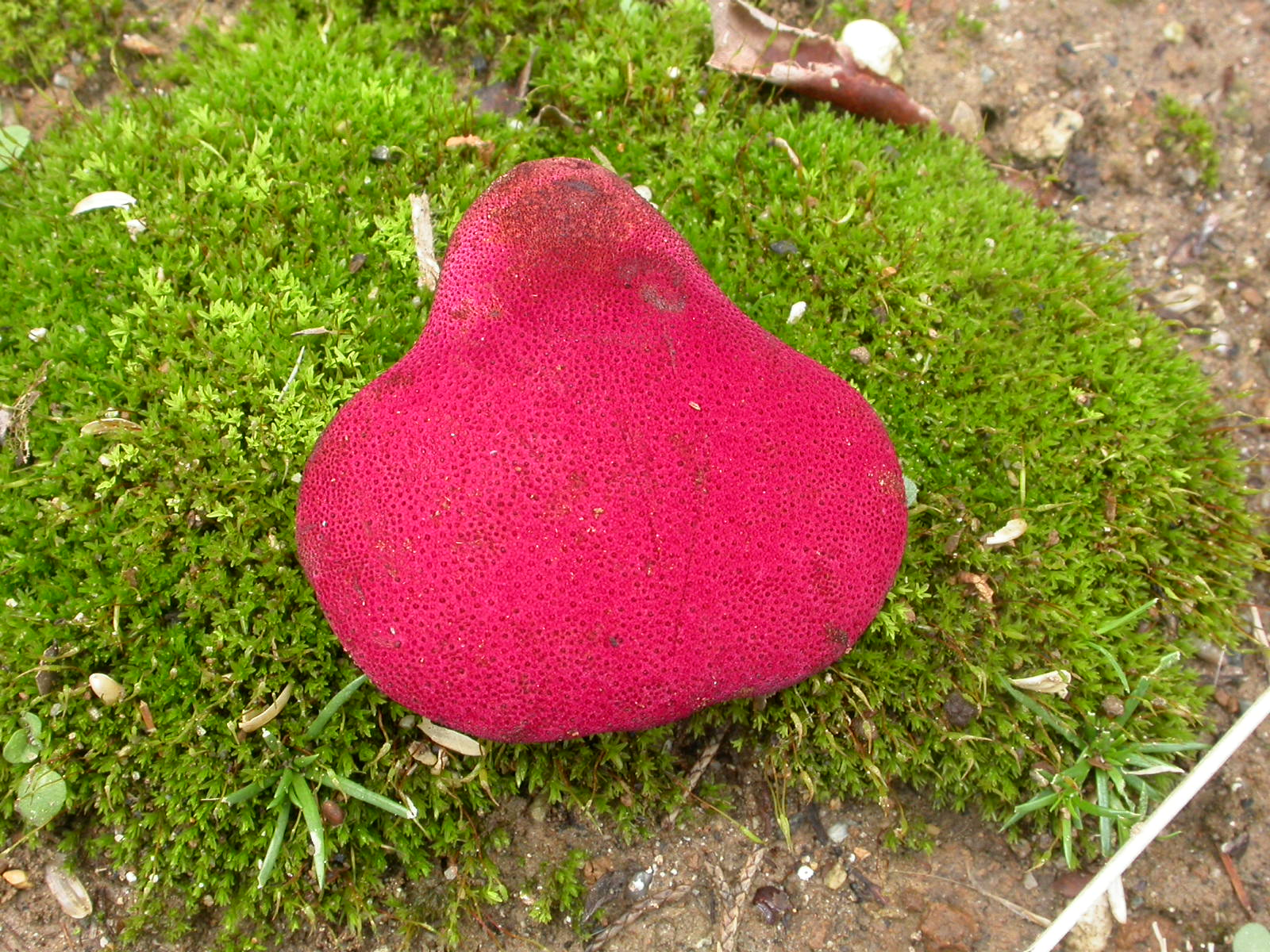
- Fresh F. hepatica on moss

Scientific classification
- Kingdom: Fungi
- Division: Basidiomycota
- Class: Agaricomycetes
- Order: Agaricales
- Family: Fistulinaceae; Lotsy

Type genus
- Fistulina Bull.

Genera
- Buglossus Wahlenb.; Confistulina Stalpers; Fistulina Bull.; Hypodrys Pers.; Pseudofistulina O. Fidalgo & M. Fidalgo

= Fistulinaceae =

Family of fungi

The Fistulinaceae are a family of fungi, the best-known member of which is the beefsteak fungus Fistulina hepatica. Molecular studies have now shown it to lie within the Agaricales.

== See also ==
- List of Agaricales families
