= Makrana Assembly constituency =

Legislative Assembly constituency in Rajasthan State, India

Coordinates: 27.03°N 74.71°E

Makrana
- Constituency No. 113 for the Rajasthan Legislative Assembly

Constituency details
- Country: India
- Region: North India
- State: Rajasthan
- District: Nagaur
- Lok Sabha constituency: Nagaur
- Established: 1993
- Total electors: 271,866
- Reservation: None

Member of Legislative Assembly
- 16th Rajasthan Legislative Assembly
- Incumbent Zakir Hussain Gesawat
- Party: Indian National Congress
- Elected year: 2023

Makrana Assembly constituency is one of the 200 Legislative Assembly constituencies of Rajasthan state in India.

It is part of Nagaur district.

== Members of the Legislative Assembly ==
Election	Name	Party
1993	Roopa Ram	Independent
1998	Abdul Aziz	Indian National Congress
2003	Bhanwar Lal Rajpurohit	Bharatiya Janata Party
2008	Zakir Hussain Gesawat	Indian National Congress
2013	Shreeram Bhincher	Bharatiya Janata Party
2018	Roopa Ram	Bharatiya Janata Party
2023	Zakir Hussain Gesawat	Indian National Congress

== Election results ==
=== 2023 ===
2023 Rajasthan Legislative Assembly election: Makrana
Party	Candidate	Votes	%	±%
INC	Zakir Hussain Gesawat	96,544	46.91	+0.81
BJP	Sumita Bhinchar	67,230	32.66	−14.24
RLP	Amar Singh	19,932	9.68	
Independent	Jaipal Meghawal	8,998	4.37	
Independent	Himmatsingh	7,274	3.53	
NOTA	None of the above	1,673	0.81	−0.02
Majority		29,314	14.25	+13.45
Turnout		205,818	75.71	−1.93
INC gain from BJP		Swing		

=== 2018 ===
Rajasthan Legislative Assembly Election, 2018: Makrana
Party	Candidate	Votes	%	±%
BJP	Roopa Ram	87,201	46.9	
INC	Zakir Hussain Gesawat	85,713	46.1	
Independent	Gangaram	2,588	1.39	
CPI(M)	Narayan Ram	2,126	1.14	
NOTA	None of the above	1,550	0.83	
Majority		1,488	0.8	
Turnout		185,927	77.64	
BJP hold		Swing		

== See also ==
- List of constituencies of the Rajasthan Legislative Assembly
- Nagaur district
