= Gunawati =

Gunawati gunvati
- Village
- Location in Rajasthan, India Gunawati (India)
- Coordinates: 27.01°N 74.71°E
- Country: India
- State: Rajasthan
- District: Didwana-Kuchaman city

Population (2021)
  - Total: 3,264

Languages
  - marwadi Official: Hindi
- Time zone: UTC+5:30 (IST)
- PIN: 341505

Gunawati is a village in Makrana tehsil in Kuchaman City district of Rajasthan, India.

It is located in the Kuchaman City, approximately 120 km west of Jaipur and 3.8 km far from Makrana.

Gunawati was established by Jorawar Singh Rathore the father of Sarv Shree Rathore. There are three Rajput koldis. It was the territory of Mertiya Rathore (akkhe singhot).

There is a historical temple of Turat Furat Mata which is situated on the marble hill on the main road which is the center of faith of thousands of devotees.

This village is under Municipal Corporation in which there are 4 wards of Makrana area. There are white stone mines in this area due to which there are thousands of marble factories and stone warehouses from where white stone is supplied in the country and abroad.

The main business of this area is marble and along with-it farming activities are also done. Many people here have contributed to the defense of the country by working in the great army. Shree Simrath Singh was Martyred in 1971 Indo-Pak War.

== History ==
Gunawati was founded in 1706 CE (Vikram Samvat 1763) by Sarv Shri Singh, the son of Joravar Singh. It was named after Birbal's sister Gunwati.

== Economy ==
Farming is the main occupation for the most of Jakhal residents. The main crops in the monsoon seasons are Bajara (Pearl Millet), Moth and Gwar. The main crops in the winter months are Wheat, Barley, Mustard Seed and Chana (Chickpeas).

== Geography ==
Gunawati is located at 27.01°N 74.71°E.

== Demographics ==
As of 2011 India census, Gunawati had a population of 3,264. Males constitute 1,794 of the population and females 1,470.
