= Budsu =

Village and historical Mertia Rathore estate in Rajasthan, India

- Village and former Thikana
- Location within Rajasthan
- Coordinates: 26.961°N 74.685°E
- Country: India
- State: Rajasthan
- District: Nagaur
- Tehsil: Makrana
- Time zone: UTC+5:30 (IST)
- Postal code: 341505
- Area code: +91-1588

Budsu is a village and a historical Thikana (feudal estate) in the Makrana tehsil of Nagaur district, Rajasthan, India. Historically, it was a prominent estate of the Mertia Rathore clan within the former Marwar State.

== History ==
=== Origins and Lineage ===
The Thikana of Budsu was established by the Keshavdasot branch of the Mertia Rathores. This lineage descends from Rao Keshavdasji, a son of the celebrated Rao Jaimal of Merta, who died defending Chittorgarh Fort in 1568.

The estate was granted to Keshavdasji as a hereditary jagir, and the family became part of the "Ganayat" (allied) nobility of Marwar, holding a high status in the court of the Jodhpur Maharajas.

=== Political and Military Role ===
The nobles of Budsu were strategically important to the Marwar state. In the late 18th century, during the Maratha-Rajput wars, the Thakur of Budsu supported the claims of Maharaja Ram Singh of Marwar. Military records indicate that Budsu forces were part of the Mertia coalition that fought in the conflicts surrounding the Marwar throne and against the Scindia forces.

During the reign of Maharaja Man Singh, the Thikana of Budsu was granted the privilege of minting its own coinage, a distinction shared with a few other estates like Kuchaman.

== Geography ==
Budsu is situated in the Nagaur region, approximately 15 km from Makrana. The village is historically part of the "Panch Mahal" region, a cluster of five significant Mertia estates.
