= Kheri Shilla =

Kheri Shilla Mundelo Ki kheri
- Village
- Country: India
- State: Rajasthan
- District: Nagaur
- Tehsil: Makrana
- Elevation: 423 m (1,388 ft)

Population (2011)
  - Total: 4,066

Languages
  - Official: Hindi, Marwari, English, Urdu Rajasthani
- Time zone: UTC+5:30 (IST)
- PIN: 341504
- ISO 3166 code: RJ-IN
- Vehicle registration: RJ-
- Website: http://rajasthan.gov.in/

Kheri Shilla is a village in Makrana tehsil in Nagaur district, Rajasthan state of India. It is 7 km from Gachhipura. Other names for Kheri Shella are Mundelo Ki kheri and Guda Kheri, and the latest name of is Devnagari Kheri Sheela. There is a temple of Lord Dev Narayan.

== History ==
It is an old village, which, before independence (1947) was under Jodhpur riyasat. The village is currently in Makaran Tahsil but was formerly in Parbatsar tahsil. Culturaliy it is predominantly Rajasthani (Marwari). Kheri Sheela is a small village located in Makrana Tehsil of Nagaur district, Rajasthan with total 244 families residing. The Kheri Sheela village has population of 1199 of which 588 are males while 611 are females as per Population Census 2011.

In Kheri Sheela village population of children with age 0-6 is 167 which makes up 13.93% of total population of village. Average Sex Ratio of Kheri Sheela village is 1039 which is higher than Rajasthan state average of 928. Child Sex Ratio for the Kheri Sheela as per census is 965, higher than Rajasthan average of 888.

Kheri Sheela village has lower literacy rate compared to Rajasthan. In 2011, literacy rate of Kheri Sheela village was 53.39% compared to 66.11% of Rajasthan. In Kheri Sheela Male literacy stands at 67.59% while female literacy rate was 39.89%.

As per constitution of India and Panchyati Raaj Act, Kheri Sheela village is administrated by Sarpanch (Head of Village) who is elected representative of village.

Caste Factor Kheri Sheela village of Nagaur has substantial population of Schedule Caste. Schedule Caste (SC) constitutes 27.52% of total population in Kheri Sheela village. The village Kheri Sheela currently does not have any Schedule Tribe (ST) population.

== Economy ==
The economy of the village is based on agriculture. Bajra (pearl millet), moong (mung beans), till (sesame) & jowar (sorghum) are the main crops during the rainy season.

The area is known for supplying oxen for traditional agriculture, although they used to be supplied to other states in India, they are no longer as popular.

It is one of the villages of Makarana mundal, which is known for supplying marble especially white marble, worldwide. Work Profile In Kheri Sheela village out of total population, 636 were engaged in work activities. 70.13% of workers describe their work as Main Work (Employment or Earning more than 6 Months) while 29.87% were involved in Marginal activity providing livelihood for less than 6 months. Of 636 workers engaged in Main Work, 361 were cultivators (owner or co-owner) while 2 were Agricultural labourer. Particulars Total Male Female Total No. of Houses 244 - - Population 1,199 588 611 Child (0–6) 167 85 82 Schedule Caste 330 162 168 Schedule Tribe 0 0 0 Literacy 53.39% 67.59% 39.89% Total Workers 636 301 335 Main Worker 446 0 0 Marginal Worker 190 0 0

== Nearby villages and features ==
The surrounding villages are Guda-Barnel to the south, Altawa to the north, to the west is Bajoli and to the east Kuchipala. The nearest towns are Gachhipura, Degana and Makrana

Around 9 km away is a mountain called Bhakri, which is a source of tungsten.

About 43 km away is an area with a large source of salt-water, where the Indian government has established a sodium production plant.

== Population ==
The population of Kheri Shilla is 5000.

=== Castes ===
70% of the population is Choudhary Mundel but other castes also live in the village including Brahmin, Maheshwari, Jangir, Megwal, Bawari, Charan and Gurjjar.
