= Hudiya =

- village
- Country: India
- State: Rajasthan
- District: Nagaur
- Tehsil: Makrana

Languages
  - Official: Hindi
- Time zone: UTC+5:30 (IST)
- ISO 3166 code: RJ-IN

Hudiya is a 300-year-old village in Makrana Tehsil in Rajasthan state in India.
