= Gelasar =

Gelasar was founded in 1703 by Rao Shyamdas Medtiya (Rathore) gelasar village located in Makrana Tehsil in the Nagaur District of Rajasthan State, India. It is currently administered by the Ajmer Division.
