= Zakir Hussain Gesawat =

Indian politician

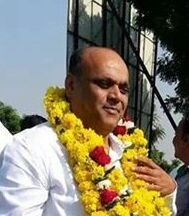

Member of the Rajasthan Legislative Assembly
- Incumbent
- Assumed office 3 December 2023
- Constituency: Makrana, nagaur
- Preceded by: Roopa Ram
- In office 10 December 2008 – 13 December 2013
- Preceded by: Bhanwar Lal Rajpurohit
- Succeeded by: Shreeram Bhincher

President, Nagaur District Congress Committee
- Incumbent
- Assumed office 11 February 2016

Personal details
- Born: 5 July 1970 (age 55) Makrana, Nagaur
- Party: Indian National Congress
- Spouse: Tabassum Praveen

Zakir Hussain Gesawat (born 5 July 1970) is an Indian politician. He is a member of the Rajasthan Legislative Assembly from Makrana, Nagaur. He is president of the District Congress Committee, Nagaur since 2016. He was previously elected to the Rajasthan Assembly in 2008 from same constituency. He is a member of the Indian National Congress.

== Political career ==
Gesawat was elected as MLA in Rajasthan Assembly 2008 election. He was elected as MLA. He was defeated by Shreeram Bhincher in Rajasthan Assembly Election 2013 with a huge margin difference. He is candidate for Indian National Congress from Makrana Assembly of Rajasthan (113) for Assembly Election 2018 of Rajasthan.

=== Rajasthan Assembly Election 2023 ===
He won 2023 Rajasthan Assembly elections by defeating BJP candidate Sumita Bhincher by a margin of 29,314 votes.

=== Rajasthan Assembly Election 2018 ===
He got Indian National Congress ticket for Rajasthan Assembly election 2018 from Makrana but lost to Roopa Ram of Bhartiya Janta Party by a margin of 1072 votes.

== Membership in Committees ==
- Member, Committee on Petitions (2010–2011)
- Member, Committee on Petitions (2009–2010)
- Member, Committee on Petitions (2011–2012)
- Member, Committee on Estimates "A" (2010–2011)
- Member, Committee on Estimates "A" (2011–2012)
- Member, Committee on Welfare of Minorities (2012–2013)
- Member, Committee on Welfare of Minorities (2013–2014)
