= Roopa Ram =

Indian politician

Roopa Ram Muravatiya

9th Member of the Legislative Assembly
- In office 10 December 1993 – 11 December 1998
- Preceded by: Birdaram Indian National Congress
- Succeeded by: Abdul Aziz Indian National Congress
- Constituency: Makrana

15th Member of the Legislative Assembly
- In office 13 December 2018 – 3 December 2023
- Preceded by: Shreeram Bhincher
- Succeeded by: Zakir Hussain Gesawat
- Constituency: Makrana

Personal details
- Born: 15 November 1954 (age 70); Makrana, India
- Political party: Bharatiya Janata Party
- Spouse: Sarju Devi
- Children: 4
- Occupation: Agriculture

Roopa Ram (born 15 November 1954), also known as Roopa Ram Murawatiya, is an Indian politician from Rajasthan and a member of Bharatiya Janata Party. He is an elected Member of 15th Legislative Assembly of Rajasthan from Makrana.

== Early life ==
Roopa Ram was born on 15 November 1954 in Makrana to Andaram Murawatiya. He passed higher secondary from Higher Secondary School of Makrana in 1975. He was a state level football player and a member of City Club of Football, Makrana and still plays football daily in Syed Kidwai Football Stadium Makrana.

== Political career ==
Roopa Ram was elected as Member of Legislative Assembly from Makrana constituency in 1993 as a Non Partisan and defeated Indian National Congress candidate Abdul Aziz, former Minister of State, Government of Rajasthan by 4,931 votes and secured 30,400 votes. In 1998, he contested Bhartiya Janta Party candidate but was not able to secure his seat and got only 24,912 votes and Abdul Aziz won that election by 19951 votes. After that he retired from politics for 20 years. In 2018, he was again active in politics and contested as candidate of Bhartiya Janta Party from Makrana Assembly, and defeated Zakir Hussain Gesawat by a narrow margin of 1,072 votes.

=== In Rajasthan Assembly ===
Murawatiya often raises issues of Makrana locality and the state in the Rajasthan Legislative Assembly. He had sung folk song "Teja gayan" in the assembly. He has also raised the issue of filling illegal VCR by electricity department in Makrana.

On 15 February 2021, commenting on Rahul Gandhi after a massive farmer's rally held on 13 February 2021 in Makrana, Ram alleged the Rajasthan Government used system machinery for crowd. Ram also commented that Gandhi converts all marble businessmen to farmers, like he converts potato to gold. This caused an uproar in the house and prompted the Education Minister Govind Singh Dorasra to call Ram a 'joker'. All the comments were later deleted from the House Records of Rajathan Assembly after being contested by the Congress members.

== Personal life ==
He is married to Sarju Devi. They have two sons and two daughters.
