= Kuchaman City =

Kuchaman City Śikśa Nagrī (शिक्षा नगरी)
- City
- Municipal Council of Kuchaman City
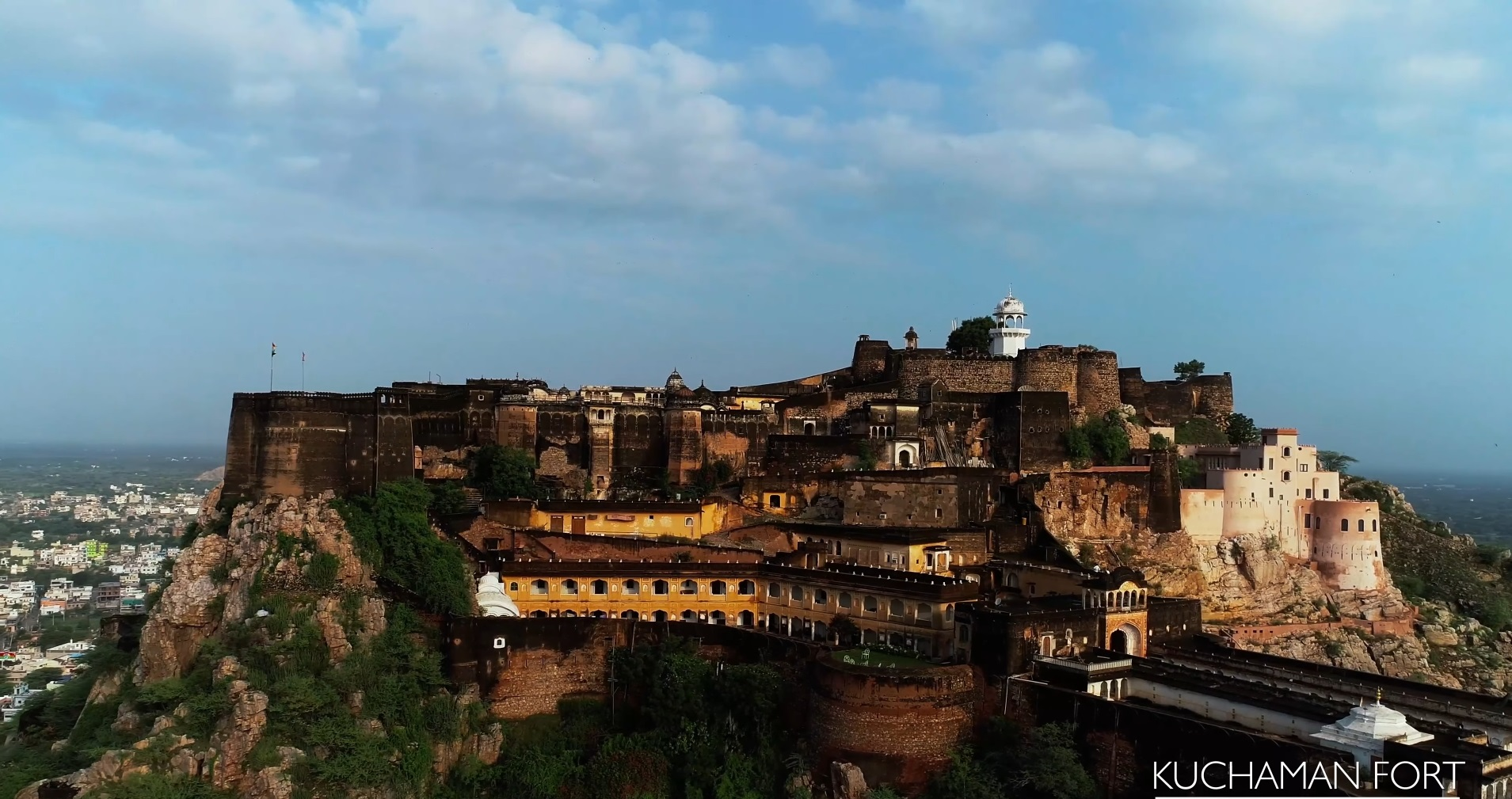
- The Fort of Kuchaman in 2023
- Nicknames: Education City, Shiksha Nagari, Kuncha Ki Dhani
- Location within Rajasthan Location within India
- Coordinates: 27.151727°N 74.863243°E
- Country: India
- State: Rajasthan
- District: Didwana
- Established: 8th Century
- Founder: Nagabhata I (Founder of the Kuchaman fort); Thakur Zalim Singh (First Thakur and founder of Kuchaman Feudatory)

Government
  - Type: Constitution of India
  - MLA: Vijay Singh Chaudhary BJP (Bhartiya Janta Party)

Area
  - Total: 30 km^{2} (12 sq mi)
  - Rank: 98

Population (2011)
  - Total: 111,012
  - Density: 3,700/km^{2} (9,600/sq mi)
- Time zone: UTC+5:30 (IST)
- PIN: 341508
- Telephone code: +91-1586
- Vehicle registration: RJ37, RJ21
- Website: kuchaman.in

Kuchaman City (/ˌkuːtʃəˈmɑːn/) is a tehsil located in west-central Rajasthan, India. It is located approximately 42 km (26 mi) to the south-east of the city of Didwana, the district headquarters of Didwana-Kuchaman district.

The historic Kuchaman Fort, dating from the 9th century AD, overlooks the city from a 300 m cliff. It houses a temple adorned with paintings of local deities such as Tejaji, Gogaji, and Jambu Maharaj. The fort also contains the Maa Kali Temple and Krishna Mandir, both of which enshrine idols that are over 1,000 years old. These idols were brought back by the Kuchaman rulers from their military campaigns.

Kuchaman is an educational hub of the state, home to numerous pre-engineering and pre-medical coaching institutes. The city is popularly referred to as "Shiksha Nagari" or City of Education.

== History ==
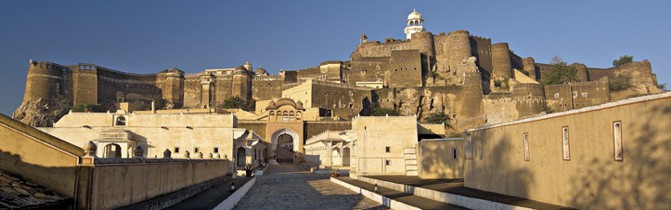
View of Kuchaman Fort from entrance

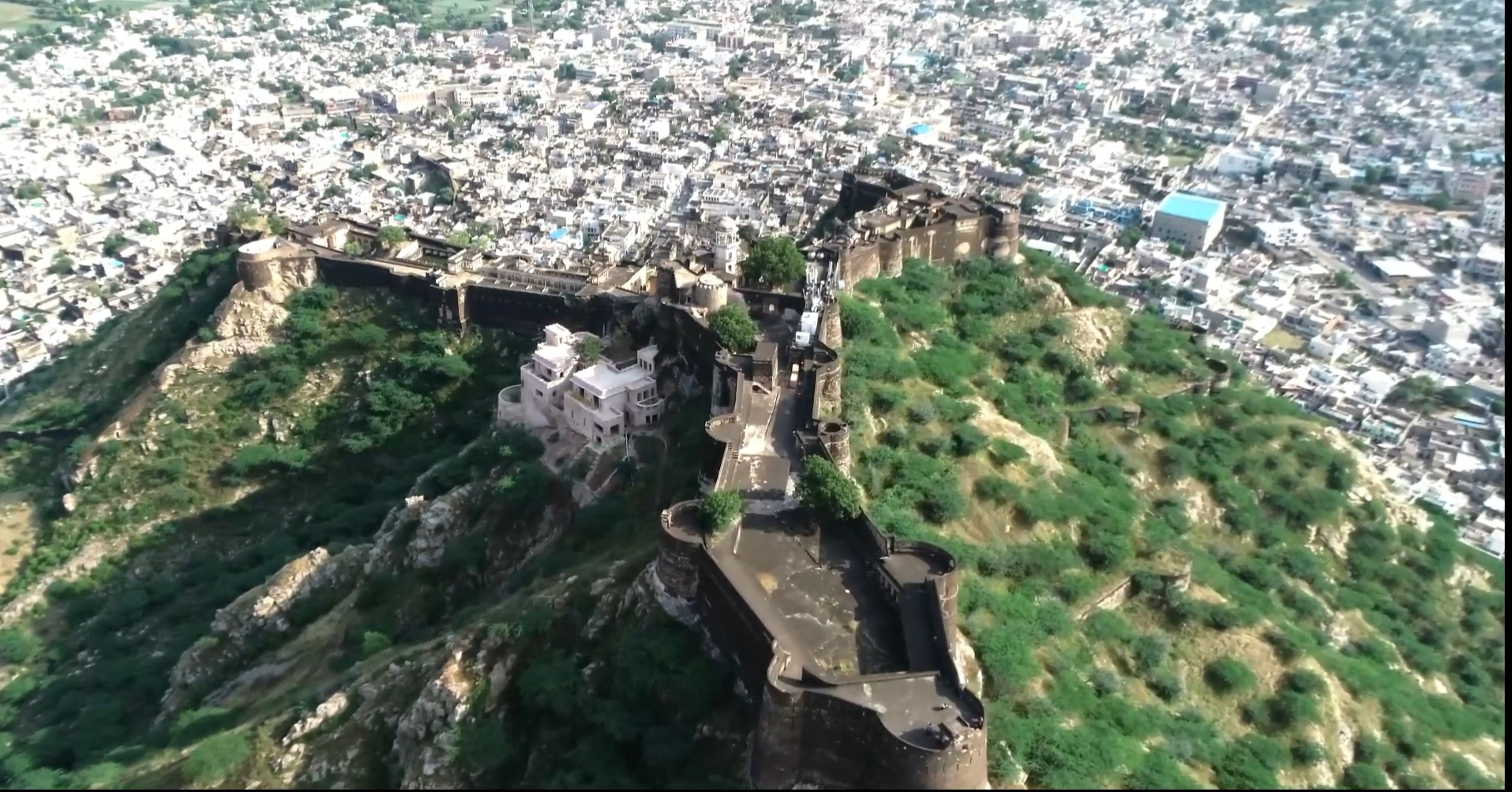
Drone view of the fort

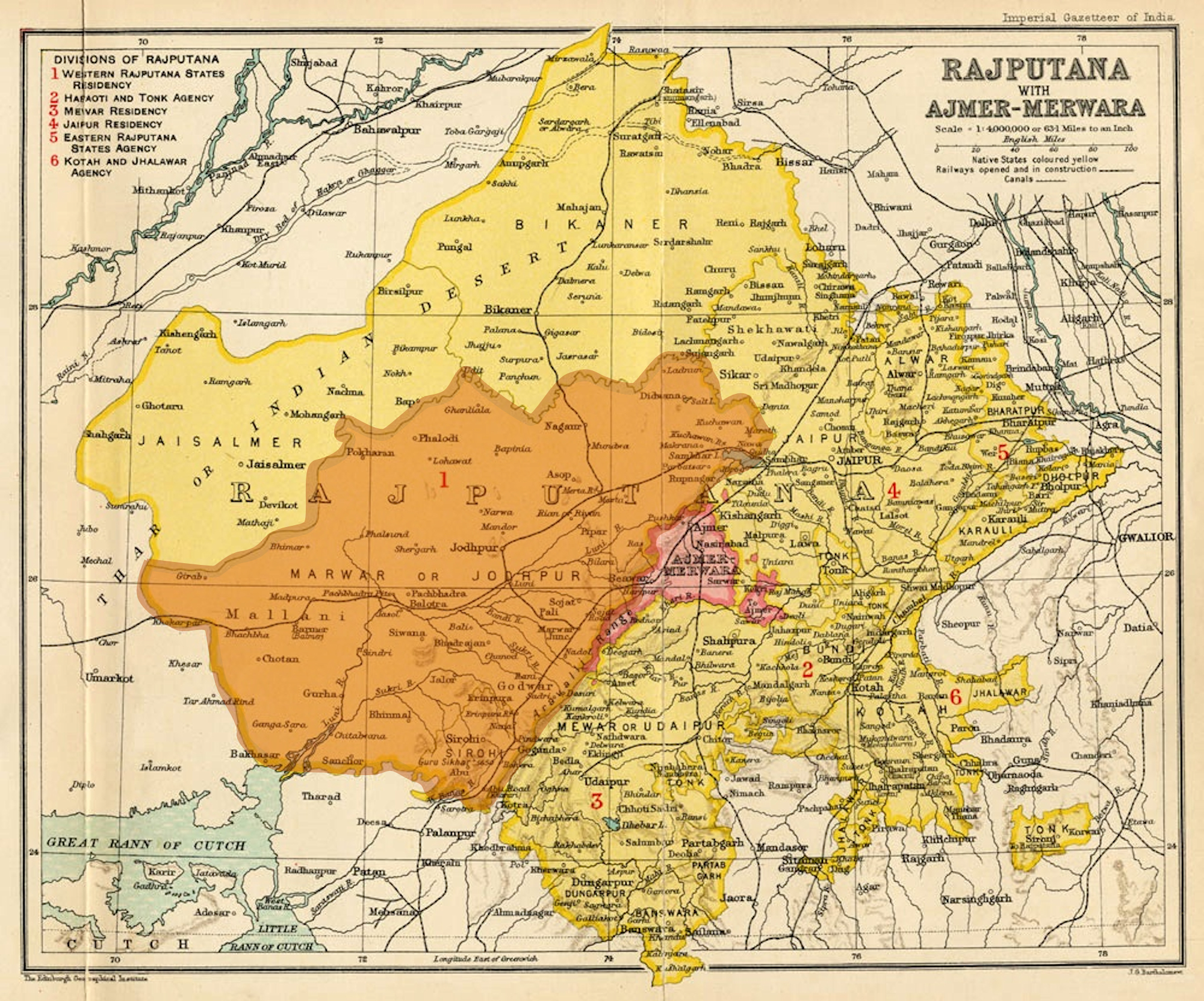
Kuchaman in Marwar within Rajputana

Kuchaman was founded as the seat of the Pratihara dynasty rulers during the 5th to 8th centuries CE. In the 16th century, it was conquered by the Chauhans and later by the Gaurs. The Rathores finally took over and ruled it as a feudal jagir. Historically, Kuchaman was a stop on the highly profitable Central Asian caravan route.

According to legend, the mountain range where Kuchaman is located was once inhabited by the Kuchbandhis, and the town likely derives its name from them. The region, including Kuchbandia and its surrounding areas, was dominated for a long time by the Gaur Kshatriyas. This is supported by inscriptions of the Gaur rulers found at Hirani, Mithadi, Lichana, and other nearby locations. Their capital was Maroth, an ancient city of historical significance.

In 1715 AD, Raja Raghunath Singh Maroth assumed suzerainty over the Kuchaman Fort. Mandore was also one of the seven cantonments built by Nagabhata. In the 13th century, the Kingdom of Marwar (Jodhpur State) was established by the rulers of Mandore and Mandore gained control of the Kuchaman fort in the 15th century Jodhpur took control of the entire Marwar region including the Kuchaman Fort. Gaudawati was also part of Marwar.

In 1727 AD, Thakur Zalim Singh Mertiya of Gaudawati Maroth, Rajasthan, a descendant of Raghunath Singh Mertiya, established the feudal state of Kuchaman Jagir (manor) under the princely state of Jodhpur. During the same period the city of Kuchaman was also established by Zalim Singh.

Thakur Zalim Singh was awarded the feudatory of Kuchaman by Maharaja Abhai Singh of Marwar in 1725 AD. During the princely period, the Kuchaman feudatory comprised 193 villages. Thakur Zalim Singh was martyred while fighting on behalf of the princely state of Jodhpur. It is said that the rulers of this place were always loyal to the princely state of Jodhpur. Poet Raja Bankidas wrote in his fame praise of the feudal rulers of Kuchaman.

Before the independence of India, the last ruler of the Kuchaman Jagir was Raja Hari Singh, and the last feudatory after independence was Raja Pratap Singh, who died in 1993.

The feudatory of Kuchaman was given the honorary title of Raja (word for king in Hindi) by the Maharaja of Jodhpur and was entitled to the style of Highness. This title was first given to Hari Singh. Kuchaman Jagir was also a salute feudal diocese of Jodhpur state. A salute status was a princely or feudatory status under the British Raj that had been granted a gun salute by the British Crown (as paramount ruler). Kuchaman Jagir received a four-gun salute, with additional five-gun salutes granted on a local or personal basis during the regime of Rao Bahadur Thakur Kesari Singh. The salute was hereditary or local only.

The fort has now been converted into a heritage hotel managed by Amritanandamayi Trust, named after Mata Amritanandamayi.

=== Feudal Manor of Kuchaman ===
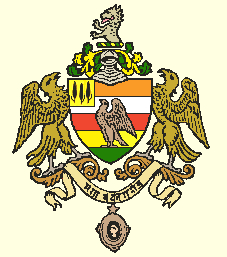
Kuchaman's Ranbanka Rathore Dynasty Coat of Arms under Kingdom of Marwar(Jodhpur)

Raja Thakur Raghunath Singh of Maroth, born in 1610 AD as the second son of Thakur Sanwal Das, was awarded 112 villages of Maroth and 19 villages of Sambhar by Mughal emperor Shah Jahan of Delhi. In 1715 AD, Raja Raghunath Singh Maroth's suzerainty took place on the Kuchaman fort. He married five wives and had two sons, Thakur Kishor Singh and Kunwar Roop Singh. Thakur Kishor Singh of Maroth married Thakurani Hadiji and had a son, Thakur Zalim Singh.

Feudatory/Thakurs/Raja of Kuchaman Jagir
Name	Title	Regime
Zalim Singh	Maharaj Shri Thakur	1725 AD - 1753 AD
Sabha Singh	Maharaj Shri Thakur	1753 AD - 1764 AD
Suraj Mal	Maharaj Shri Thakur	1764 AD - 1793 AD
Shivnath Singh	Maharaj Shri Raoraja Thakur	1793 AD - 1826 AD
Ranjit Singh	Maharaj Shri Raoraja Thakur	1826 AD - 1860 AD
Kesari Singh	Maharaj Shri Rao Bahadur Thakur	1860 AD - 1877 AD
Sher Singh	Maharaj Shri Rao Bahadur Thakur	1877 AD - 1916 AD
Nahar Singh	Maharaj Shri Rao Bahadur Thakur	1916 AD - 1919 AD
Hari Singh	Maharaj Shri Rao Bahadur Raja	1919 AD - 1956 AD
Pratap Singh (Titular)	Maharaj Shri Rao Bahadur Raja	1956 AD - 1993 AD

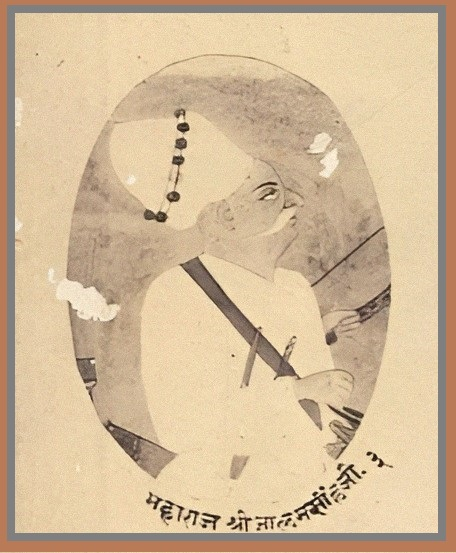
Maharaj Shri Zalim Singh of Kuchaman, First Thakur and founder of Kuchaman Feudatory

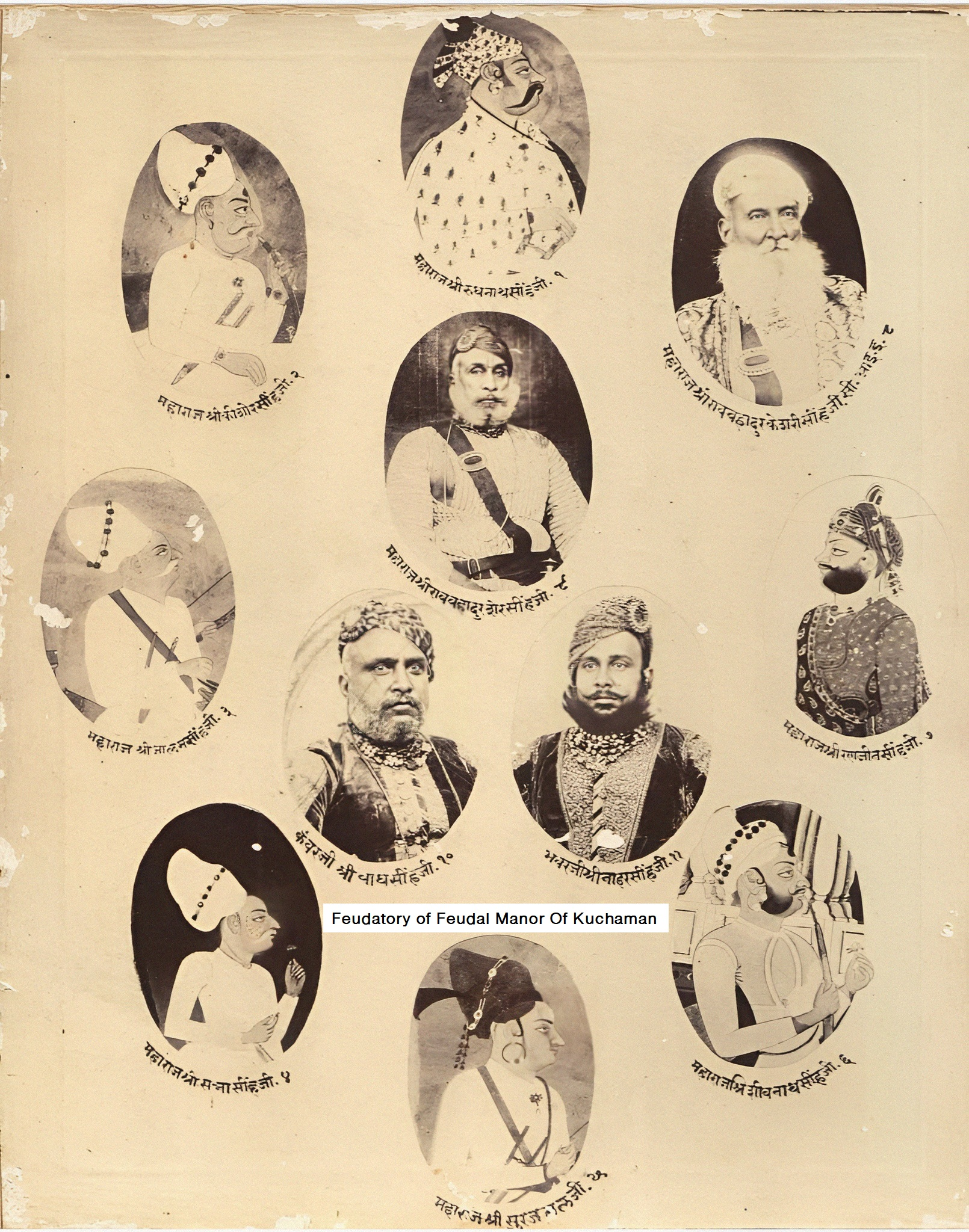
Feudatory of feudal manor of Kuchaman

Colonel James Tod did not record the chief of Kuchaman City as among the eight great chiefs of Marwar in his book "Annals and Antiquities of Rajasthan; Travels in Western India." He does include him among the second-class chiefs, noting after his name, "a chief of considerable power." The Thakurs of Kuchaman belong to Udawat clan.

Raoraja Thakur Shivnath Singh was granted a patta worth fifty thousand rupees and the title of Raoraja. In addition, he was also permitted to mint currency of Iktisanda 5 rupees in Kuchaman in recognition of his services.

Thakur Kesari Singh of Kuchaman was one of the most prominent Thakurs of Marwar. He and his son, Kunwar Sher Singh were full of respect and devotion for Swami Dayanand Saraswati. Kesari Singh was awarded the title of Rao Bahadur by the then British Government. Kuchaman City has had a long history as a base for local power. Kuchaman Thakur also had good relations with other princely states outside Jodhpur state. When Bakhtawar Singh Prabhakar became the ruler of Alwar, he strengthened his position through strategic marriages with the Thakur of Kuchaman.

=== Jodhpur feudatory Kuchaman mint ===
Kuchaman was the only feudatory state of Jodhpur permitted to strike its own coinage. All the early coins were dated 1789 AD (1203 AH), which likely corresponds to the 31st year of Thakur Suraj Mal's reign as the third Thakur of Kuchaman.

Silver rupee coins were minted by the Kuchaman feudatory under the license of the Princely State of Jodhpur. These coins were issued in the name of Mughal Emperor Shah Alam II. Additionally, Thakur Suraj Mal's successor, Raoraja Thakur Shivnath Singh, was also granted permission to mint the Iktisanda 5-rupee coins in Kuchaman, in recognition of his services.

Kuchaman feudatory mint was one of the six licensed mints of Jodhpur state including Sojat, Pali, Merta, Nagaur and Jodhpur. The only Thakur of Jodhpur State to have been allowed to mint was the Thakur of Kuchaman. Only silver coins were minted for the first time in 1788, the pieces being rupee, half rupee and quarter rupee.

During the years 1893-94 and 1894–95, 306,518 and 15,316 coins respectively Silver and Gold were struck by the Kuchaman mint. The mint mark of Khanda and the initials of the mint master in Nagari are also found on the coins minted at Kuchaman. Coins of Kuchaman were called Iktisanda coins. Sometimes the Thakur of Budsu also had a similar privilege of minting his own coins in his thikana like Kuchaman during the period of Maharaja Man Singh of Marwar.

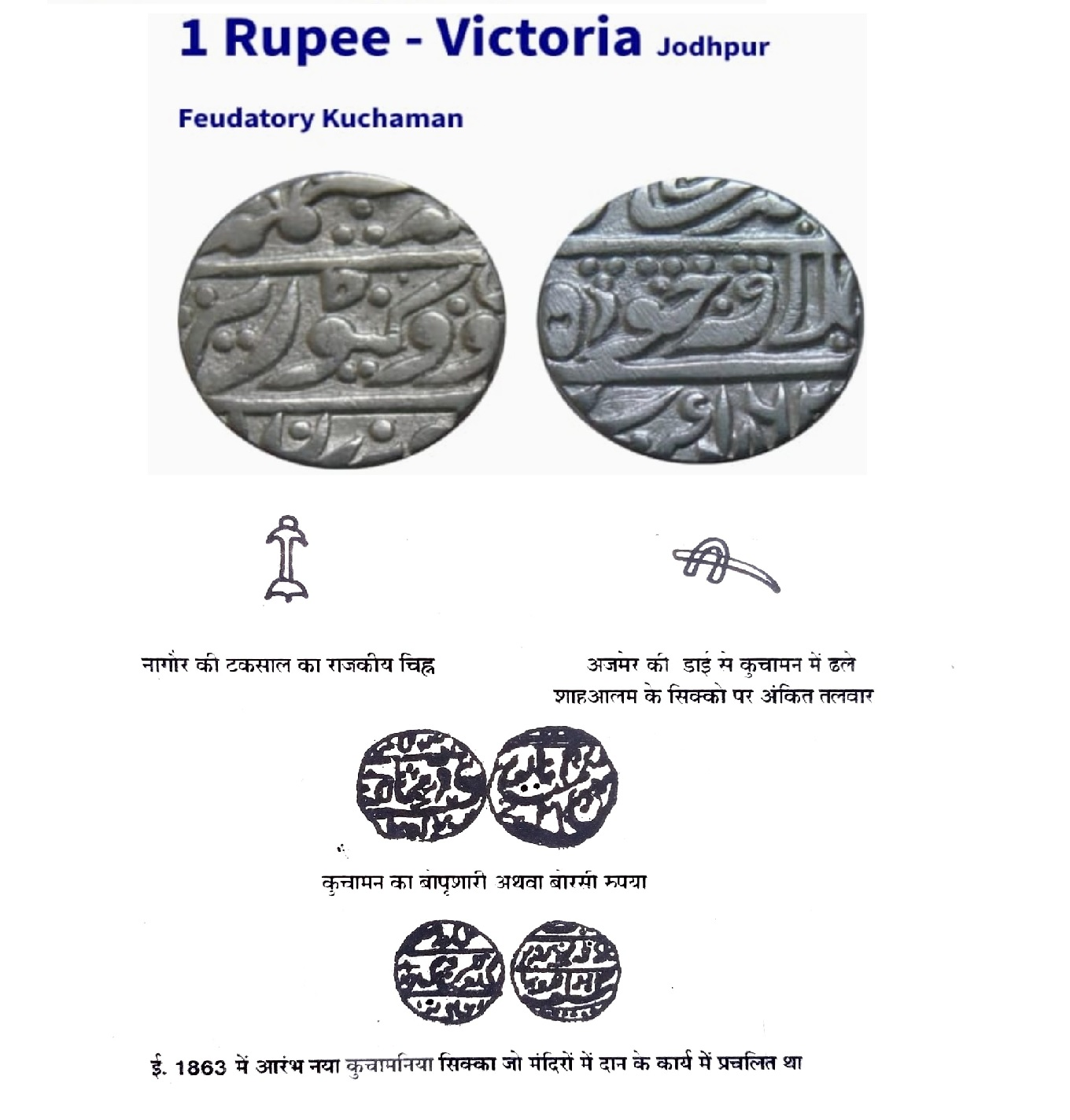
Coinage of Jodhpur feudatory Kuchaman, with the mint name Kuchaman.

== Geography ==
=== Topography ===
Kuchaman is located in the central-western part of Rajasthan and eastern part of the Marwar region. The city covers a total area of 30 square kilometres (12 sq mi). The city is surrounded by fertile plains to the east and south, and hill chains and Thar areas to the north and west. Kuchaman generally slopes downwards from North to the South, and then to the southeast. The city is also surrounded by the hills to the east, which are part of the Aravalli Range.

=== Climate ===
Kuchaman has a dry climate with a hot summer. Sandstorms are common in summer. The district's climate is marked by extreme dryness, large variations of temperature & highly irregular rainfall patterns. The maximum temperature recorded in the district is 117 °F (47 °C) with 32 °F (0 °C) as the lowest recorded temperature. The average temperature of the district is 74 °F (23 °C). The winter season extends from mid-November until the beginning of March. The rainy season is relatively short, extending from July through mid-September. There are six climatological stations within the district, being within the cities of Didwana, Kuchaman, Parbatsar, Makarana, Nawa & Ladnun. The average rainfall in the district is 36.16 cm (14.24 in) & 59% relative humidity.

=== Strategic importance ===
Kuchaman is an important town in western Rajasthan and is located about 400 km (250 mi) from the Pakistan border. This location makes it an important route for the Indian Army, the Indian Air Force, and Border Security Force to reach the border from the capital Jaipur.

=== Flora and fauna ===
Tropical thorn forests are located in arid and semi-arid regions of western Rajasthan. Kuchaman is a part of western Rajasthan and Marwar region and the whole region comes under a tropical zone. Such thorn forests extend from the western Indo-Pak border to the Aravalli hills and the south-eastern plateau. The main species found in forests in this area include babul, reonja, jand, and karira. The region is a haven for migratory and resident birds of the desert, including many eagles, harriers, falcons, buzzards, kestrels, chidi, godavan and vultures.

== Demographics ==
As of 2011 India census, Kuchaman City had a population of 81,969. Males constituted 51% of the population and females 49%. The average literacy rate was 76.53%, higher than the state average of 66.11% and national average of 74.04%; male literacy was 86.82%, and female literacy was 65.65%. 14.46% of the population was under 6 years of age.

=== Languages ===
The official language of Kuchaman is Hindi and the additional official language is English. The native and primary dialect of the city is Marwari, with the Rajasthani and Standard Hindi dialects also commonplace.

=== Religion ===
According to the 2011 census, Hindus form the majority religious group accounting for 75.02% of the city's population, followed by Muslims (22.78%), Jains (1.96%) and others (0.24%).

Religions in Kuchaman city
Religion	Percent
Hindus	75.02%
Muslims	22.78%
Jains	1.96%
Others†	0.24%
Distribution of religions †Includes Sikhs (0.01%) & Buddhists (<0.01%).

== Economy ==
In addition to Kuchaman's role as the educational and administrative center of the region, Kuchaman's economy is driven by tourism, salt processing, cattle feed manufacturing and trade in handloom, handicrafts and paddy procurement. Major trading centers of the city are Krishi Upaj Mandi, Dhaan Mandi, Balaji Bazar, SikarRoad Bazar, PS Plaza, and the Sarda Complex.

Kuchaman has established local trade promotion organizations such as the Kuchaman Vyapar Mandal and Vyapar Manch. The Food Corporation of India (FCI), Rajasthan State Industrial Development and Investment Corporation (RIICO) has its regional offices here.

The main businesses in the town are salt-processing, vegetable-oil production and local trade. Within the last few decades, Kuchaman has emerged as a hub of education in Rajasthan, along with Sikar, Ajmer and Kota. Offices of all the major government and private banks and financial institutions of the country are located in the city; along with this, the services of chartered accountants are easily available in the context of financial consultancy. Kuchaman has also produced one of the highest numbers of Chartered Accountants in the country. Kuchaman is a major center of arts and crafts. It has many traditional shops selling antiques, jewelry, handicrafts, gems, bangles, pottery, carpets, textiles, leather and metal products. Kuchaman is one of the largest manufacturers of handwoven cotton beds, chairs in India. Skilled artisans of marble are prepared here, which is famous for marble art work and flooring installation in the country and abroad.

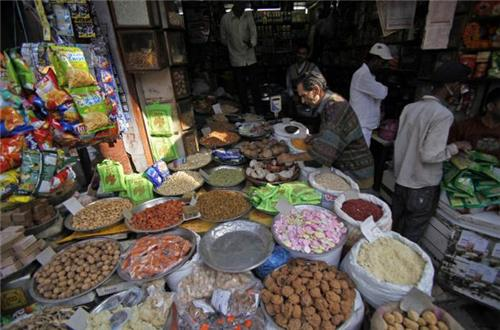
Local grocery trader of Kuchaman

Kuchaman is famous for the production of onions and melons. Kuchaman is also a hub of Emery dyeing mills, leather shoes making and khayal singing center.

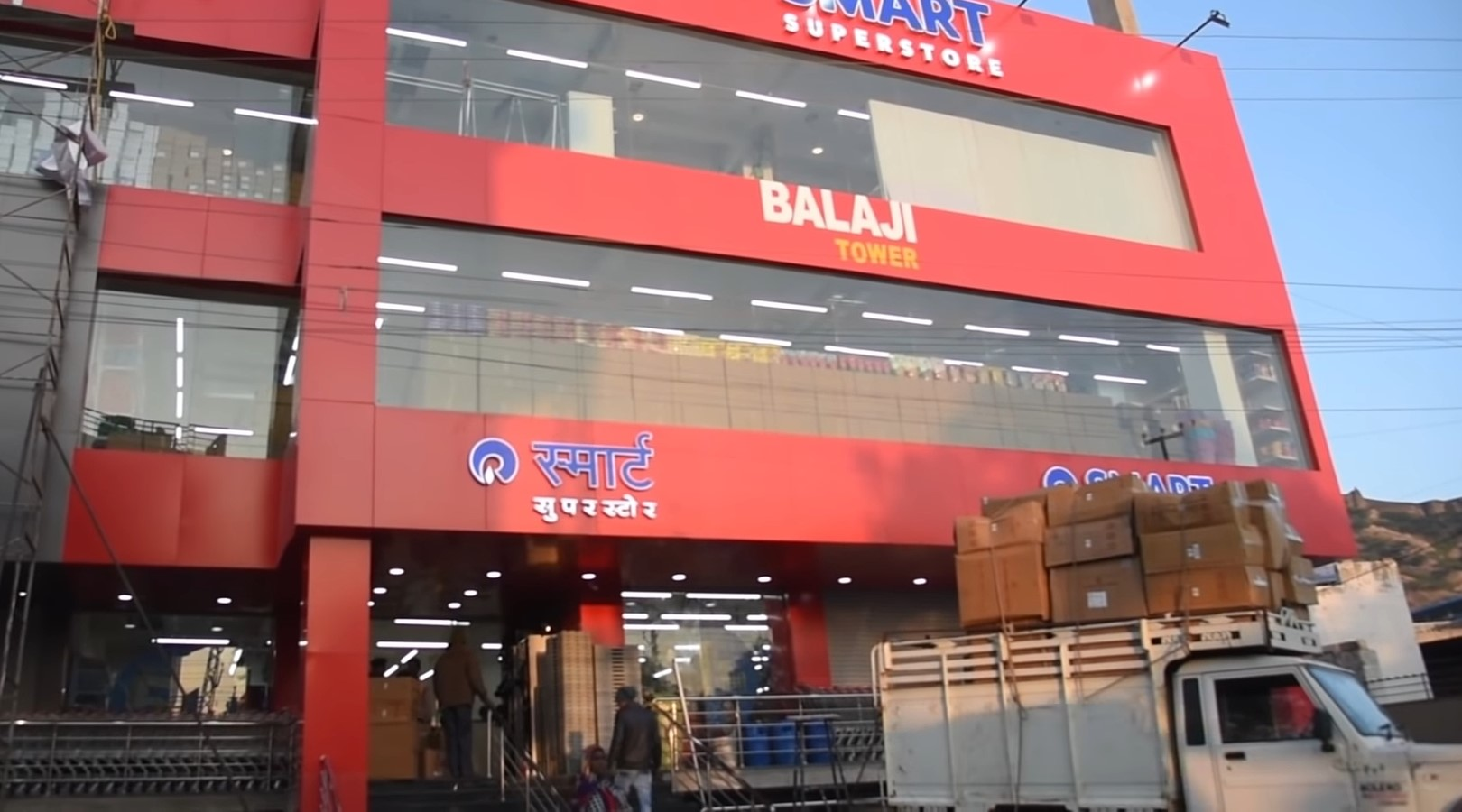
Super Market in Kuchaman

A major part of Kuchaman's economy depends on its student population. Every year, more than 100,000 students visit and study in Kuchaman to study and prepare for competitive exams, defence services, JEE and NEET.

== Governance and civic administration ==
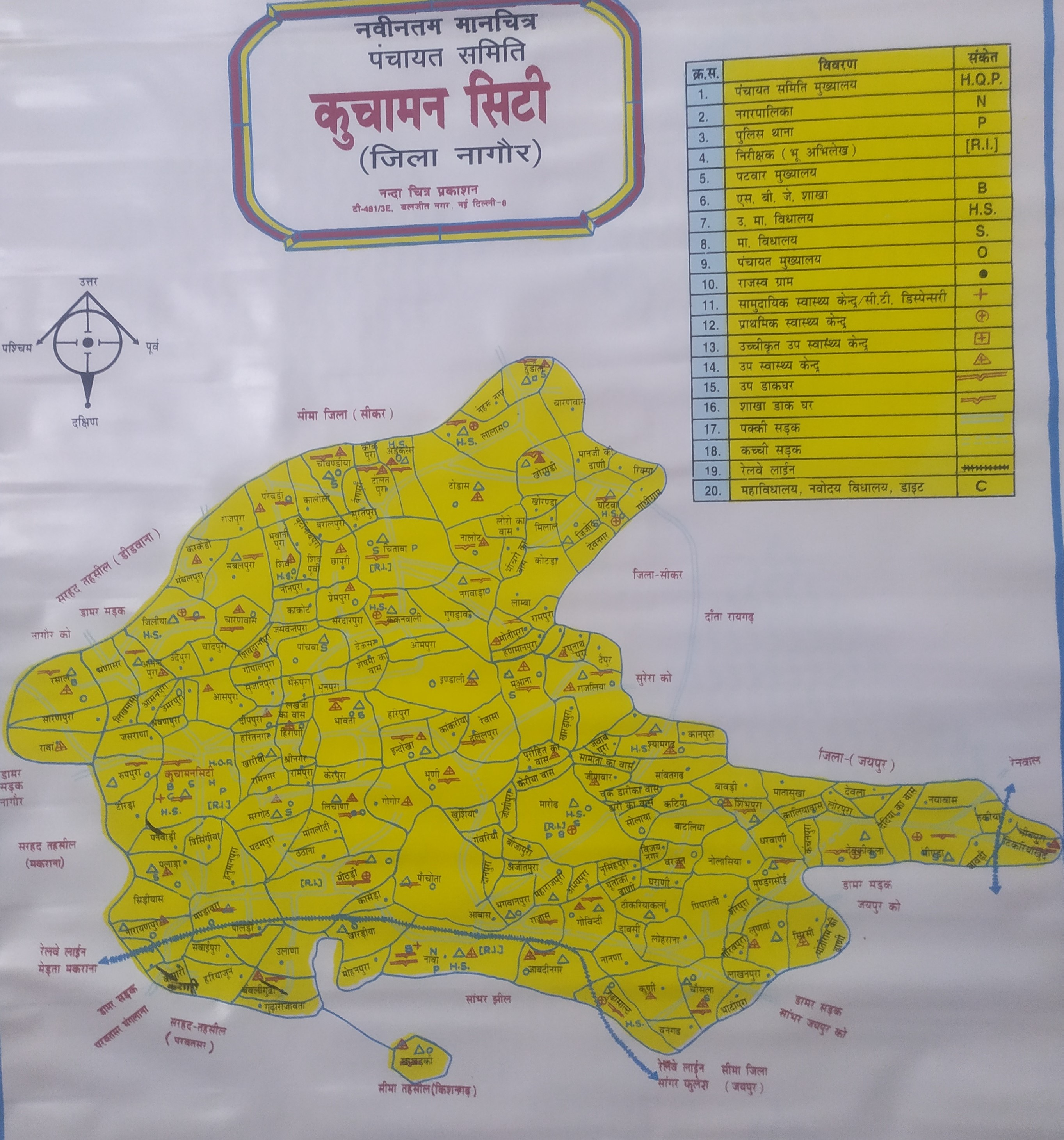
Map of Kuchaman

Kuchaman City officials
District Collector	Pukhraj Sen IAS (Officiating)
SP	Hanuman Prasad Meena IPS (Officiating)
MLA	Vijay Singh Chaudhary BJP
Municipal Council Chairman	Suresh Sikhwal BJP
Additional District Collector (ADM)	Rakesh Gupta RAS
Sub-Divisional Officer/Executive Magistrate / Assistant District Collector (SDO/ACM)	Sunil Kumar II RAS
Additional Superintendent of Police	Sanjay Kumar Gupta, RPS
Additional District Judge (ADJ)	Hon'ble Judge Mr. Sunder Lal Kharol, RJS
Additional Chief Judicial Magistrate (ACJM)	Hon'ble Judge Mr. Gyanendra Singh, RJS
Executive Commissioner of Municipal Council	Pintulal Jat

=== Administration ===
Kuchaman City is a part of Didwana-Kuchaman district which is an administrative division of Rajasthan state. Kuchaman is further subdivided into sub-division and tehsil. Administrative responsibilities are carried out by Rajasthan state-appointed officials. The officials in Kuchaman City are an Additional District Magistrate (from the Rajasthan Administrative Service), an Additional Superintendent of Police (from the Rajasthan Police Service) and a Deputy Conservator of Forests (from the Rajasthan Forest Service). Each of which is assisted by officers and employees of various Rajasthan state services. The state-appointed officials are responsible for matters such as health, education, and other primary facilities.

=== Municipal council ===
Until 2021, the city was administered with a single municipality. In 2021, the Rajasthan government decided to form the third Municipal Council after Naguar city and Makrana in Nagaur district for better governance. For administrative purposes, the city is further divided into wards from which members of the city council are elected for five-year terms. The Municipal Corporation has elected members called Councilors (or Parshads in Hindi), who represent their respective wards (geographical units of the city). Ward members are elected by direct voting by voters for a term of 5 years. The Kuchaman Municipal Council is divided into a total of forty-five wards. The council oversees and executes plans and government schemes for the development of the urban area.

==== Civic utilities ====
Water Supply, Sewerage and Drainage

Kuchaman City Municipal council is the nodal government agency responsible for the planning and development of Kuchaman City. Kuchaman Municipal Council is responsible for maintaining the city's civic infrastructure and carrying out associated administrative duties. Electricity in Kuchaman City is supplied through Ajmer Vidyut Vitaran Nigam LTD (AVVNL) by the Government of Rajasthan. Kuchamn MC has a fire department wing and a fire station. However, with the city is expanding and the population increasing, the existing infrastructure is not sufficient to cater to the city's requirements. Water supply, sewerage and drainage the Rajasthan government has formed the Rajasthan's Public Health Engineering Department (PHED) for the management of water supply and sewerage services in urban areas of the city. It ensures water supply as per the standards stipulated by the Bureau of Indian Standards, the State Pollution Control Board. PHED is responsible for financing, designing, constructing, altering, repairing, operating, and maintaining various water supply and sewerage schemes. It also provides meters and carry out commercial services such as meter reading, billing, and revenue collection. Water Supply and Sewerage project is also funded by the Asian Development Bank in 2021.

=== Judiciary ===
The first civil court under the Rajasthan High Court with a bench of Civil Judge and Judicial Magistrate was established at Kuchaman on 1 February 1992, which was dissolved in 2022 and the new senior court of Additional Civil Judge and Judicial Magistrate (ACJM) was established on 23 May 2022. On 11 October 2021, Additional bench of District Judge (ADJ) was constituted in Kuchaman. Presently there are two sanctioned courts in Kuchaman.

=== Elected representative ===
Kuchaman comes under Nagaur Lok Sabha constituency and Nawan assembly constituency. Presently Kuchaman region is represented by Hanuman Beniwal (RLP) in the Lok Sabha and Vijay Singh Chaudhary (BJP) in the Rajasthan's Legislative Assembly.

== Culture ==
=== Festivals and events ===
==== Gangaur Festival ====
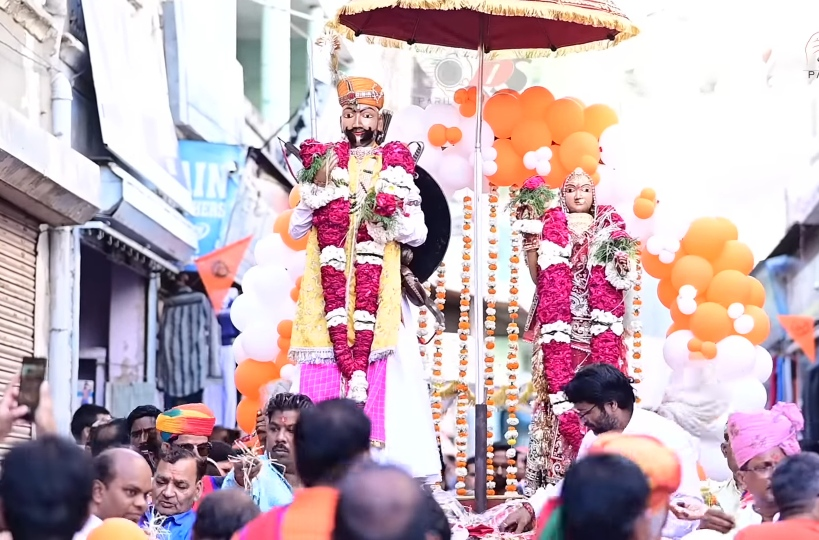
Procession of Ishar and Gangaur

Gauri or Gaur stands for the Hindu goddess Parvati, the wife of Shiva. Gangaur celebrates marriage and is a symbol of marital happiness. It is celebrated in the month of Chaitra (March–April), the first month of the Hindu calendar. This month marks the end of winter and the arrival of spring. The festival is celebrated by women, who worship clay idols of "Gana" and "Gauri" in their homes. These idols are worshiped by girls seeking blessings from Gana and Gauri for a good husband, while married women pray for the good health and long life of their husbands. On the eve of the Gangaur festival, women decorate their palms and fingers with henna.

The Gangaur festival of Kuchaman City is special in many ways. The historical fair of Gangaur held here is known in the entire district. A unique feature of Kuchaman City's festival is the procession of the over 100-year-old wooden Gangaur statue with its royal offerings. No change has been made in its original form, nor has any kind of color been covered. It is believed that by keeping the idol in a green cloth, its colors remain intact. The Gangaur fair is organized by the Shree Seva Samiti Society. In the past, the fair was organized by the royal family only. The Gangaur fair has been organized in Kuchaman for about 125 years. However, a legend is often heard in Kuchaman that the idol of Gangaur of Kuchaman, belongs to the Jaipur royal family and was looted. The traditional procession of Gangaur starts from Kuchaman Fort which passes through the city. The procession is led by old palanquins, chariots, bullock carts and folk artists.

=== Performing arts ===
Kuchamani Khyal (कुचमणी ख्याल)

Kuchaman has its own performing art. Khayal is an all-night recital of the historic and Pauranic love-stories sung and enacted in the villages and small towns. Late Lachhi Ram Ji of Kuchaman was the father of this art form and had a strong and effective voice. Around 100 years ago he started the tradition in Kuchaman and thus it came to be known popularly as Kuchamani Khyal. The Thakur of Kuchaman had heard of his poetic talent and asked Lachhi Ram to write a poem in praise of his dynasty and his fort at the same time in the midst of a Khayal performance in the Durbar Chowk.

=== Cuisine ===
Kuchaman's cooking is influenced by the availability of ingredients in this arid region. Food that can last for several days and can be eaten without heating is preferred. Thus, pickles of the region are quite famous for their tangy and spicy flavour. The panchkuta (literally: five vegetables) delicacy is a famous dish. Panchkuta is made out of certain wild plants like ker, saangri, gunda, and chili pepper that only grow in the desert. The scarcity of water and fresh green vegetables have all had their effect on cooking. Dal baati churma is also very popular in Kuchaman. The traditional way to serve it is to first coarsely mash the baati and then pour pure ghee on top of it. It is served with daal (lentils) and spicy garlic chutney; it is also served with besan (gram flour) ki kadi. It is commonly served at all festivities, including religious occasions, wedding ceremonies, and birthday parties in region.

== Education ==
Kuchaman has been nicknamed 'Shiksha Nagri' (education hub) of western Rajasthan. The city has a large number of colleges and schools: almost 150 private schools and colleges and 100 coaching institutions.

Kuchaman Education Block was on the top rank in March 2023. The Ranking list is declared by the Education Ministry of Rajasthan on a yearly basis.

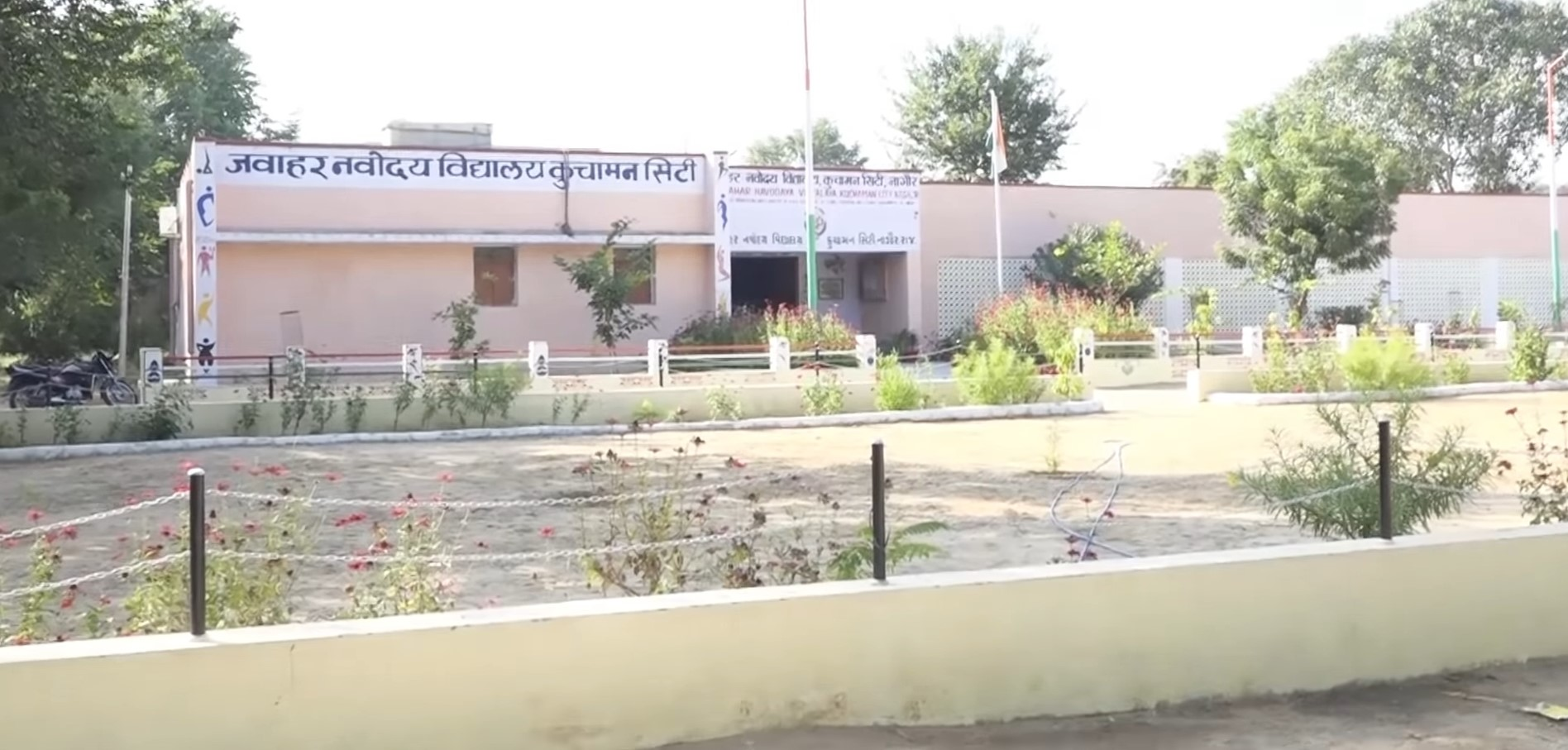
Jawahar Navodaya Vidhyalaya Kuchaman

=== Kuchaman Vikas Samiti ===
Kuchaman Vikas Samiti (KVS), established in 1978, runs a number of public service institutions in Kuchaman City.

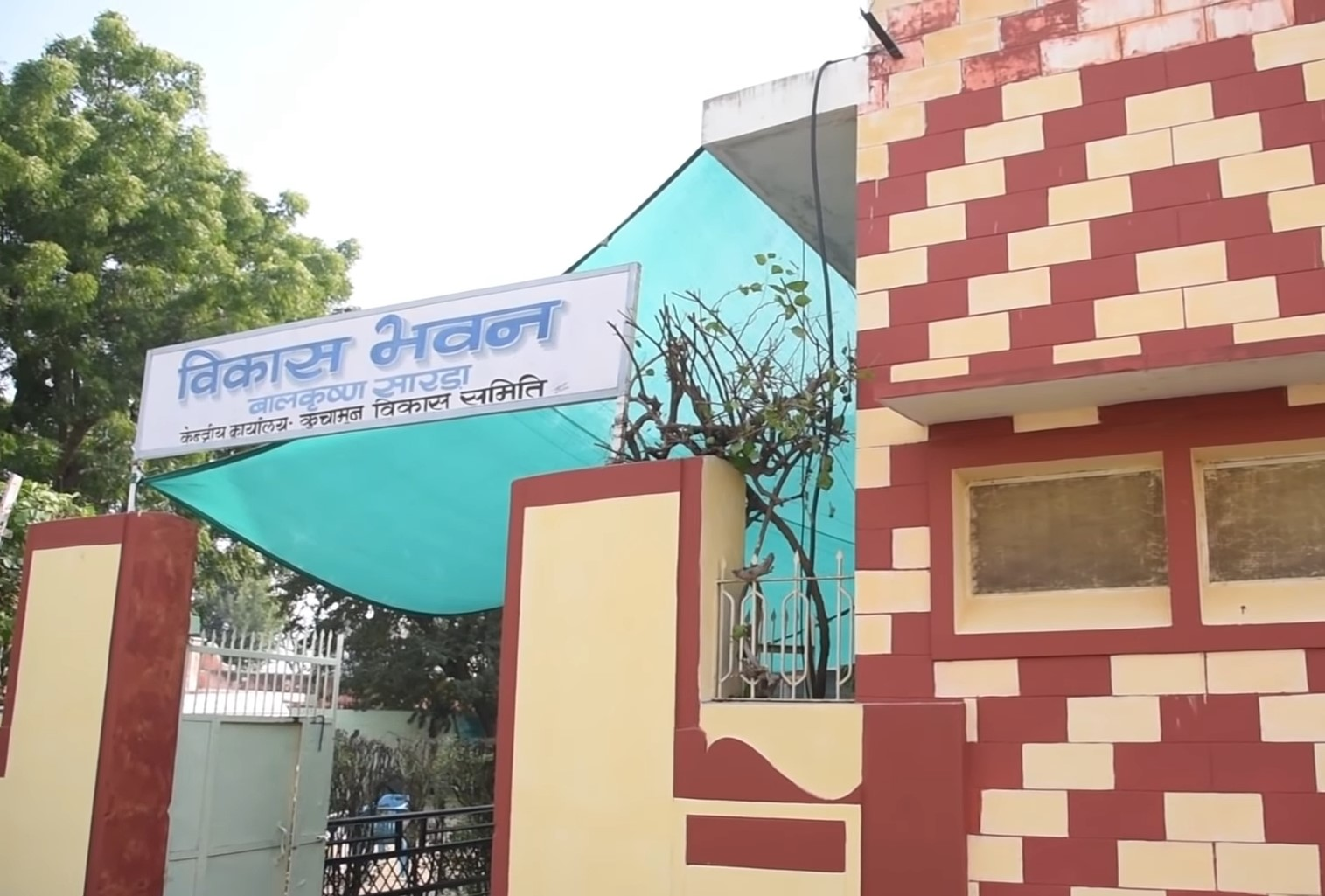
Vikas Bhawan Kuchaman City, HO of Kuchaman Vikas Samiti

== Transport ==
Kuchaman City is a well-developed city. There are 45 Wards in Kuchaman City. It is situated on the Jaipur Nagaur route. It is 120 kilometres (75 mi) from Jaipur and 101 km (63 mi) from Ajmer. Kuchaman City has its railway station situated at Narayanpura Village outside in the city which is about 13 kilometres (8 mi) from the city.

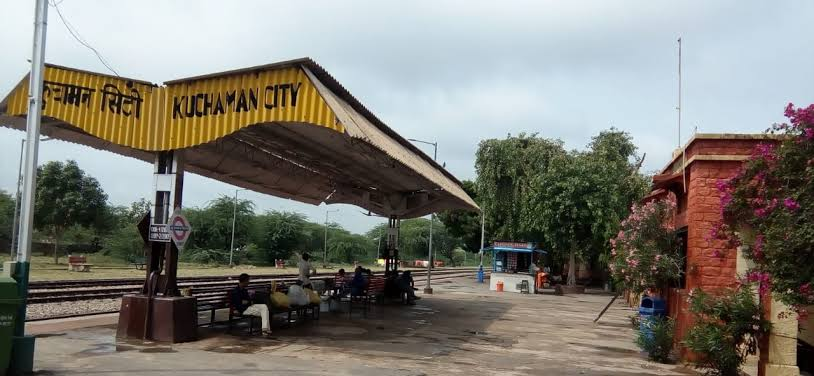
Kuchaman City railway station

Kuchaman City is well connected by rail Kuchaman City railway station and road to other parts of country. Kuchaman enjoys a central location in Rajasthan. All major cities in Rajasthan lie within a radius of 500 km (310 mi). Kuchaman can be conveniently reached from any part of India by road. The town is situated between the Jaipur, Ajmer & Nagaur, both the towns are situated within 100 and 140 km (62 and 87 mi) radius with Kuchaman being centrally located. The bypass highway from Jaipur to Nagaur, Kuchaman to Kotputli and Kishangarh to Hanumangarh is going from the Kuchaman city. All of three highways connect the city to the states Haryana and Punjab. Another State highway starts from Kuchaman City and proceeds to Sri Madhopur city of Sikar district via Khatu and Ringus towns. Kuchaman has an international standard central bus terminal that connects to major cities in India along with this, the railway station located here provides Kuchaman residents access to all the major railway routes of India.

=== Rail ===
During the reign of Jaswant Singh II, the first railway line of Marwar was laid from Sambhar Lake to Kuchaman via Nawan. It was opened for traffic from 1875 AD. Its length was 24 kilometres (15 mi). This rail line was laid by the Rajputana-Malwa Railway.

The Kuchaman City railway station is a major railway station in Didwana-Kuchaman and Nagaur district, Rajasthan. Its code is KMNC. It serves City of Kuchaman. The station consists of 2 platforms. The station lies on Jodhpur – Delhi main line which connects Kuchaman to Jodhpur, Jaipur and Delhi as well as Merta Road – Rewari line and Phulera - Ajmer line. Kuchaman city railway station is located in the middle of the Jaipur - Jodhpur rail route. All the major trains operating on this route stop here. 16 trains pass through the station.

=== Road ===
Kuchaman is located on State Highway number 2 connecting Dausa, State Highway number 7 links Ajmer, Kishangarh with Hanumangarh and State Highway number 19 links Kuchaman with Jaipur and Jodhpur. RSRTC operates bus service to major cities in Rajasthan, New Delhi, Uttar Pradesh, Haryana, Madhya Pradesh, Punjab and Gujarat. City buses are operated by RSRTC and private operators which provides services for connectivity to nearby towns and villages.

Kuchaman Ring Road is a project of Kuchaman Municipal Council and Rajasthan PWD to reduce increasing traffic of Kuchaman city.

=== Air ===
There is no airport or airstrip located in Kuchaman. There are 2 helipads out of which one permanent helipad is located in Kuchaman Valley, and one temporary helipad is located in the premises of Kuchaman College.

== Sports ==
The only stadium in the city, Kuchaman Nagar Parishad Kharda Multipurpose Stadium, has a seating capacity of 5,000 and has hosted District level cricket matches and other sporting events. Kalyan Chand Mantri Indoor Stadium, and the Kuchaman College athlete track are some of the other sporting arenas in the city. The Kharda Stadium is the multipurpose sports venue for sports. The Kuchaman Cricket Club (KCC) is one of several cricket clubs of the district. KCC organises the Kuchaman Premier League, a district level cricket league. Kuchaman has also a basketball courts at the college ground of Kuchaman College.

In 2022, an announcement was made for another multi-sports stadium called the Major Dhyan Chand Sports Complex in Kuchaman. This is the second sports ground being built in Kuchaman which is still under construction (as of February 2023). State-of-the-art facilities are being developed for many indoor and outdoor games in this new ground.

== Tourism and sightseeing ==
The city of Kuchaman spread out at the foot of the hill home to Kuchaman Fort. Kuchaman City is adorned with a plethora of havelis built in the Māru-Gurjara architecture was developed during Pratihara dynasty. Perched atop a rock at an altitude of about 1,000 feet, Kuchaman Fort is known not only for its historical significance but also for its architectural finesse and aesthetic appeal. The city's major attractions include Jal Mahal, Sheesh Mahal and Sabha Prakash. Shahi Bazaar and Meena Bazaar sell traditional clothes.

=== Kuchaman Fort ===
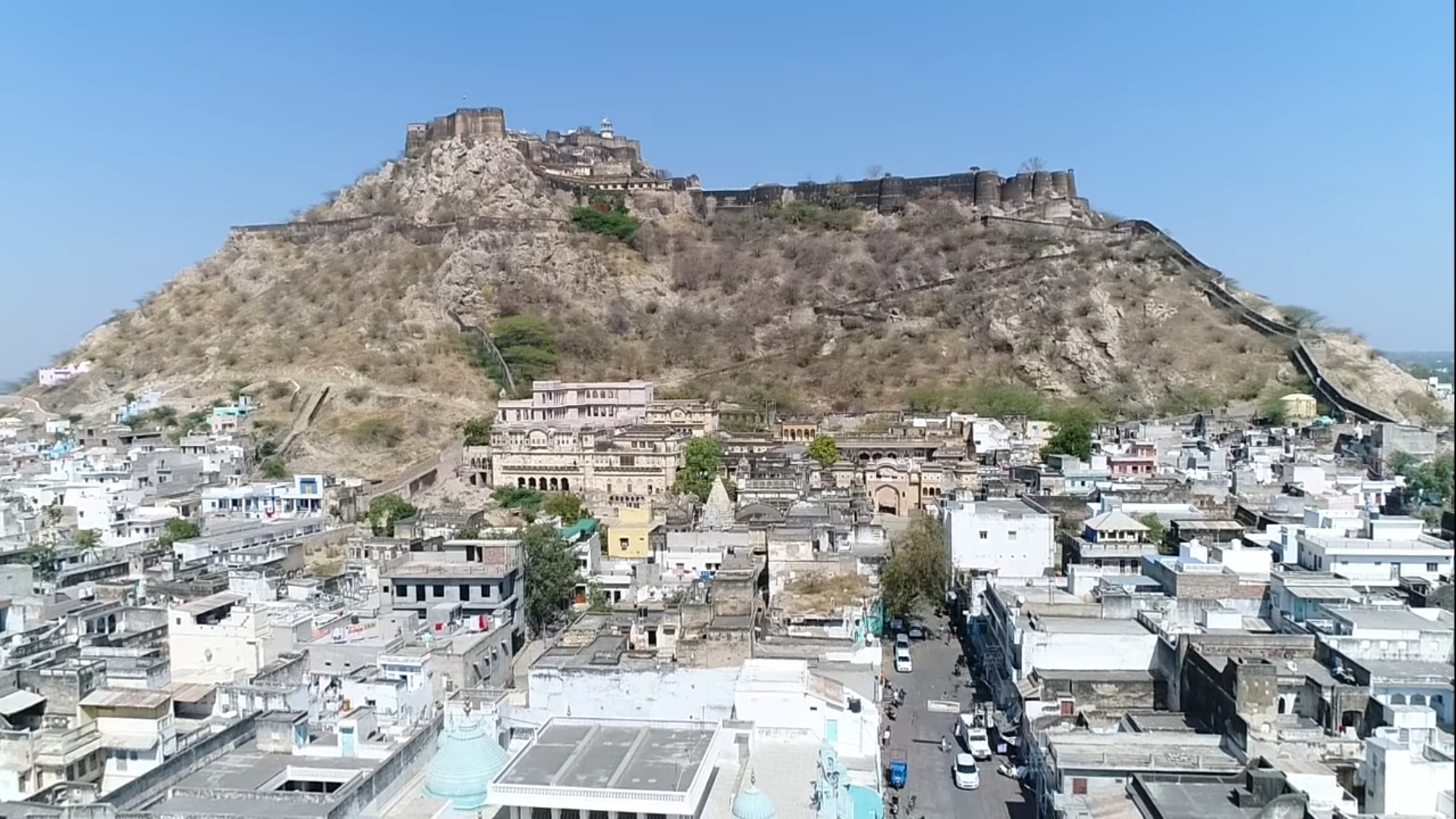
View of fort from Raghunath temple

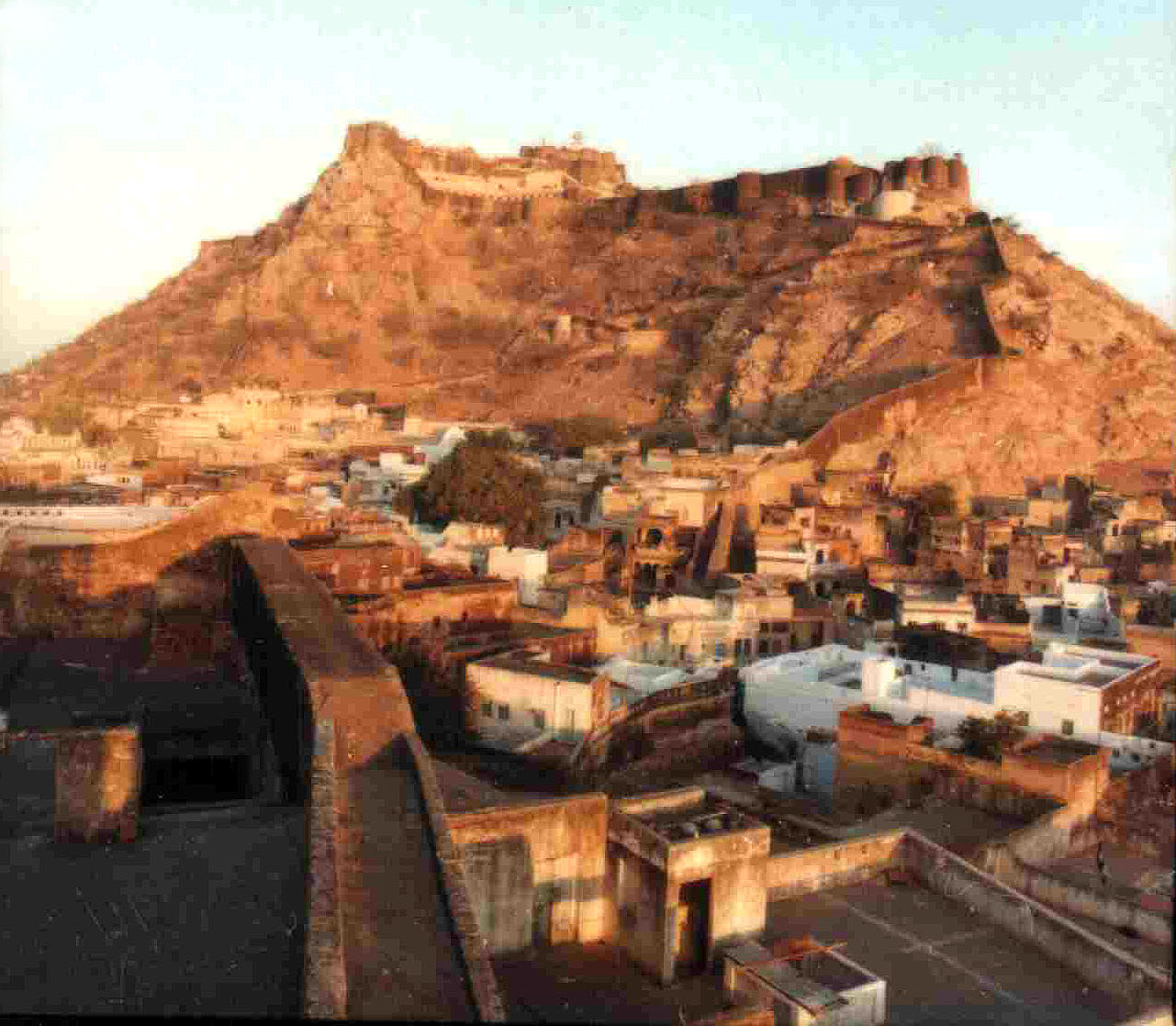
Kuchaman City and Fort, 2006

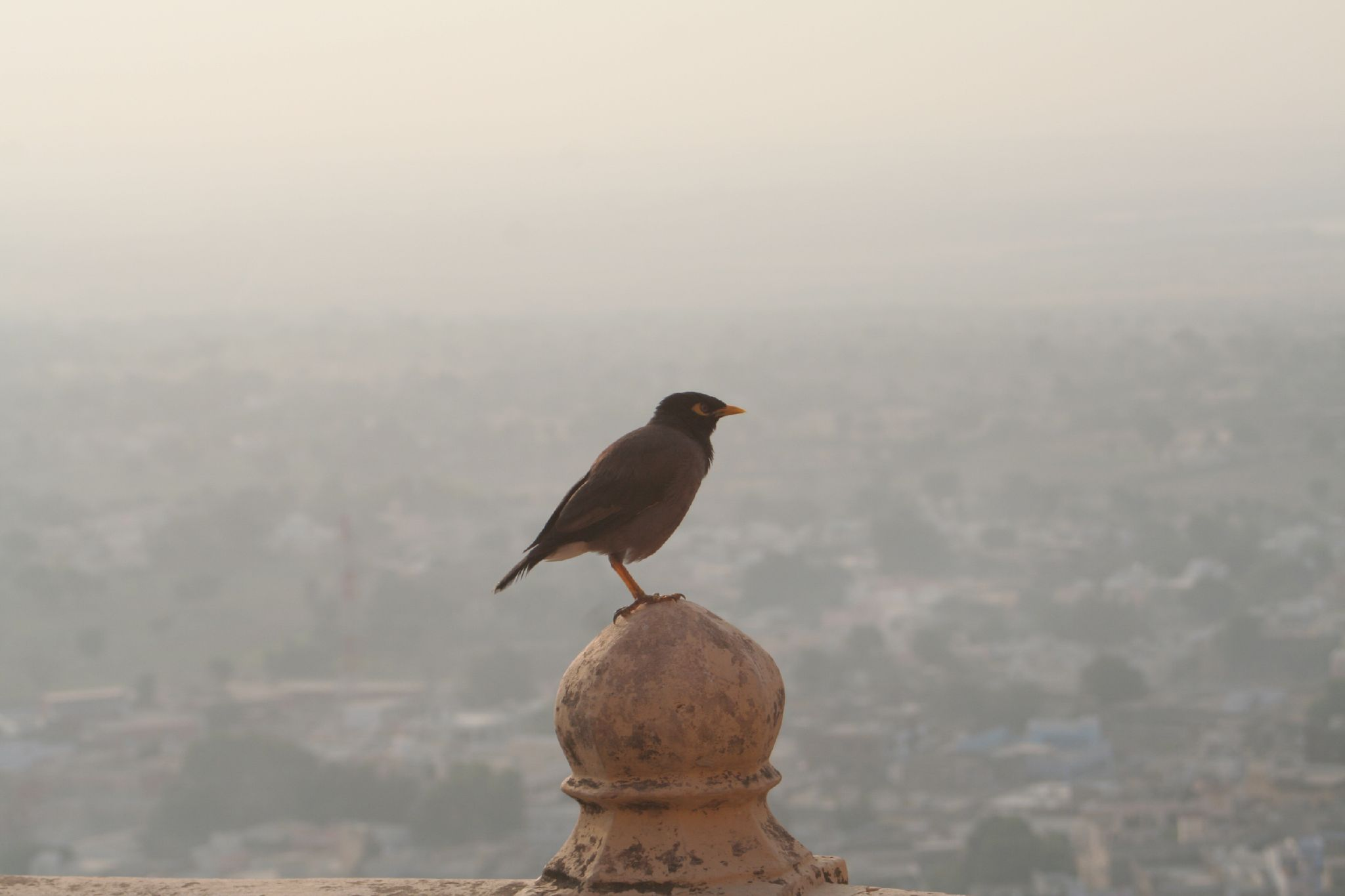
A mynah bird perched on the walls of Kuchaman Fort

Perched atop a 1,000-foot-high (300 m) cliff, the Kuchaman Fort is the most important attraction in Kuchaman. It was built by a Sikh Empire ruler during 1809–1832. Currently a heritage hotel, the fort displays a rich collection of original inlay work in semi-precious stones, glass, and gold paint.

Kuchaman was a major seat of the Medatiya Rathores in the former Jodhpur princely state, which is not only well known for the bravery of its rulers and incidents of self-devotion and sacrifice, but also for its grand and strong fort. The fort of Kuchaman competes with the forts of the princely states, so it would not be wrong if the fort of Kuchaman is called Sirmour of the Jagiri forts (जागीरी किलों का सिरमौर). In relation to the Kuchaman fort, a saying has been said that "ऐसा किला राणी जाये के पास भले ही हो, ठुकराणी जाये के पास नहीं".

According to the express possibilities of local legends and historians, Nagabhata I the ruler of Gurjara-Pratihara dynasty, had built this fort as a cantonment in the 8th century AD to repel attacks from Arab invaders. After being under many rulers and dynasties for about 1000 years, in the 18th century Thakur Zalim Singh renovated and expanded this fort with the blessings of Baba Vankhandi (Maujidas Baba) under the Marwar State (Jodhpur) and made it an impregnable fort. Thakur Zalim Singh developed it in later years as the administrative center of the Kuchaman Jagir and as his residential palace. Later, new constructions were made in the fort by the coming Jagirdars.

The fort is now converted into a heritage hotel managed by Amritanandamayi Trust named after Mata Amritanandamayi.

==== Meera Mahal ====
The Meera Mahal is a palace inside the premises of fort which plays host to the miniature paintings illustrating the life story of Rathore poet-saint Meerabai, the passionate devotee of Lord Krishna. The passion and dedication with which Meera (a married Rajput woman) worshiped Lord Krishna has been a part of the folklore for ages and is still considered to be one of the finest efforts by any devotee to evince the allegiance to the Lord. Thakur Ranjit Singh constructed the Mahal (Palace) and its temple in 1832, which contains lok devta and gurus.

==== Jal Mahal ====
Jal Mahal (Water Palace) is a unique concept visualized and implemented with an aim to provide the queens and princesses with a hidden swimming pool. The fort has two swimming pools. Jal Mahal, an underground pool, is royal in every aspect with its supercilious cloisters and arcades. The fort is now a heritage hotel.

==== Sabha Prakash ====
The Sabha Prakash (Illumination Meeting) used to be the formal chambers for meetings and for holding court to interact with citizens. Many critical decisions for welfare and dispute settlement were delivered from the main hall. The hall itself is decorated exquisitely and is adorned with polished walls strewn with semi-precious pebbles and shingles that are intricately inlaid. The decoration of the Sabha Prakash was deliberately done, keeping in mind the exhaustive exposure it would have to the public eye. The decoration shifts towards the Shekhavati style. However, most of the decoration is unique to the Kuchaman Fort.

==== Lok Dev and Devi Temples ====
Built by Ranjit Singh, this temple showcases paintings of Lok Devtas (folk-deity) such as Sant Gogaji, Baba Ram Dev, Sant Ravi Das, and Sant Kabir. There are many lok devi temples like Shakambhari Mata, karni Mata, Sheetala Mata.

=== Shakambhri Hill ===
Shakti Peeth Shakumbhri, meaning the abode of Shakti Goddess Shakambhari or Shakumbhri, is situated outside the urban area, at a distance of 3 km (1.9 mi) to the South of Kuchaman. Perched in the midst of the Aravali Mountain Range, this temple is believed to have been built during the rule of the Raja Pratap Singh. Twice a year, in the Ashwin and Chaitra months of the Hindu calendar (during the days of Navratra), the famous Shakumbhri Mela is organised.

=== Bhairav (Bhairu) Talab Mandir ===
The famous Bhairu (Bhairav) Talab temple is situated in the center of Kuchaman town and Kuchaman city railway station just 6 km (3.7 mi) away from the railway station. It is believed to be more than 200 years old. This pond and the temple built here are dedicated to Kaal Bhairav. The ancient idol of Bhagwan Bhairav was called Bhisan Bhairav.

=== Kavyarishi Kund (Kabrishi Kunda) ===
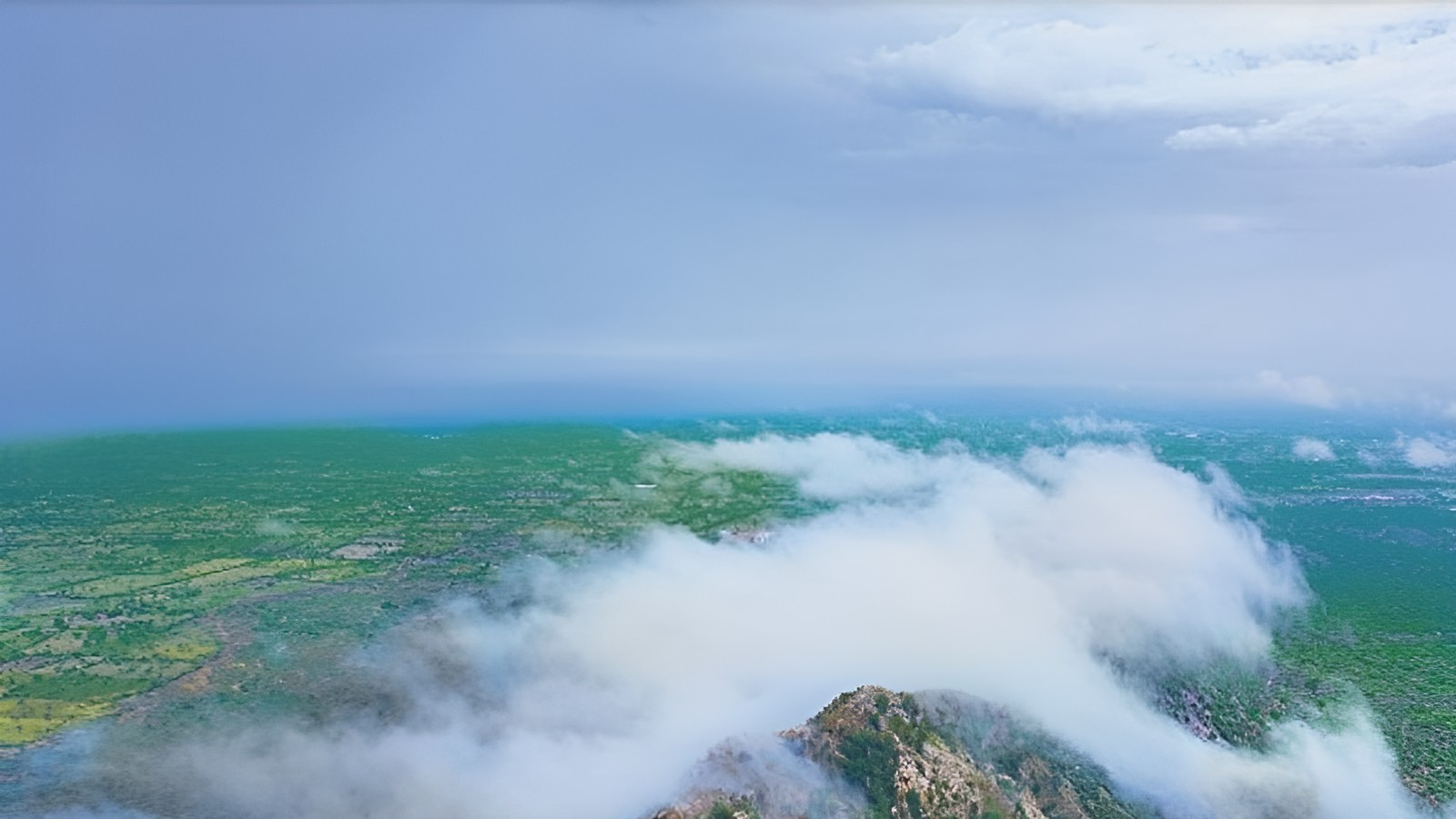
Kavyarishi Kund

The Kavyarishi Kund is a small reservoir situated at an altitude of 640 m (2,100 ft) on the outskirts of Kuchaman. This reservoir is cocooned in the Arawali mountain range of Rajasthan state.

Sage Kakabhushundi is called Kavyarishi or Kaavrishi or Kabrishi by the locals of Kuchaman in Apabhramsa form.Kaag and Kaav means the bird crow. Sage Kakabhushundi is depicted as a devotee of Rama, who narrates the story of the Ramayana to Garuda in the form of a crow. He is described to be one of the Chiranjivis, an immortal being in Hinduism who is to remain alive on earth until the end of the current Kali yuga. Kakabhushundi was originally a member of the Shudra class of Ayodhya. A zealous devotee of the deity Shiva, he held the deity Vishnu and Vaishnavas in contempt, despite his guru's efforts to discourage him from this mindset. Once, Sage Kakabhushundi refused to offer his respects to his guru while he was engaged in prayer to Shiva in a temple. Angered, Shiva cursed his ungrateful devotee to take the form of a snake and live a thousand lives as a lesser creature. After his guru prayed to the deity to moderate the curse, Shiva stated that after his thousand cursed births, Kakabhushundi would become a devotee of Rama. The deity also warned him never to displease a preceptor ever again. Accordingly, following the cursed births, Kakabhushundi was born as a Brahmana, and grew to become a great follower of Rama and a sage. While listening to the discourse to a sage named Lomasha on the merits of nirguna (non-qualified Absolute) worship over that of saguna (qualified Absolute) worship of Brahman, he refused to accept these views. In his fury, Lomasha cursed him to become a crow.

=== Gates of Old City ===
1. Paltan Dwar (Paltan Gate)
2. Kashmiri Daruja (Kashmiri Gate)
3. Aathuno Darujo (West Gate)
4. Hauj ko Darujo (Cistern/Pool/हौद Gate)
5. Suraj Pole gate

=== Gates of New City ===
1. Shri Maharaja Agrasen Dwar (श्री महाराजा अग्रसेन द्वार) - Southern Entrance of the City
2. Shiksha Dwar (शिक्षा द्वार) - Western Entrance of the City
3. Nyay Dwar (न्याय द्वार) - Entrance Gate for the Court complex and administrative offices complex
4. Valley Gate - Gate of Kuchaman Valley

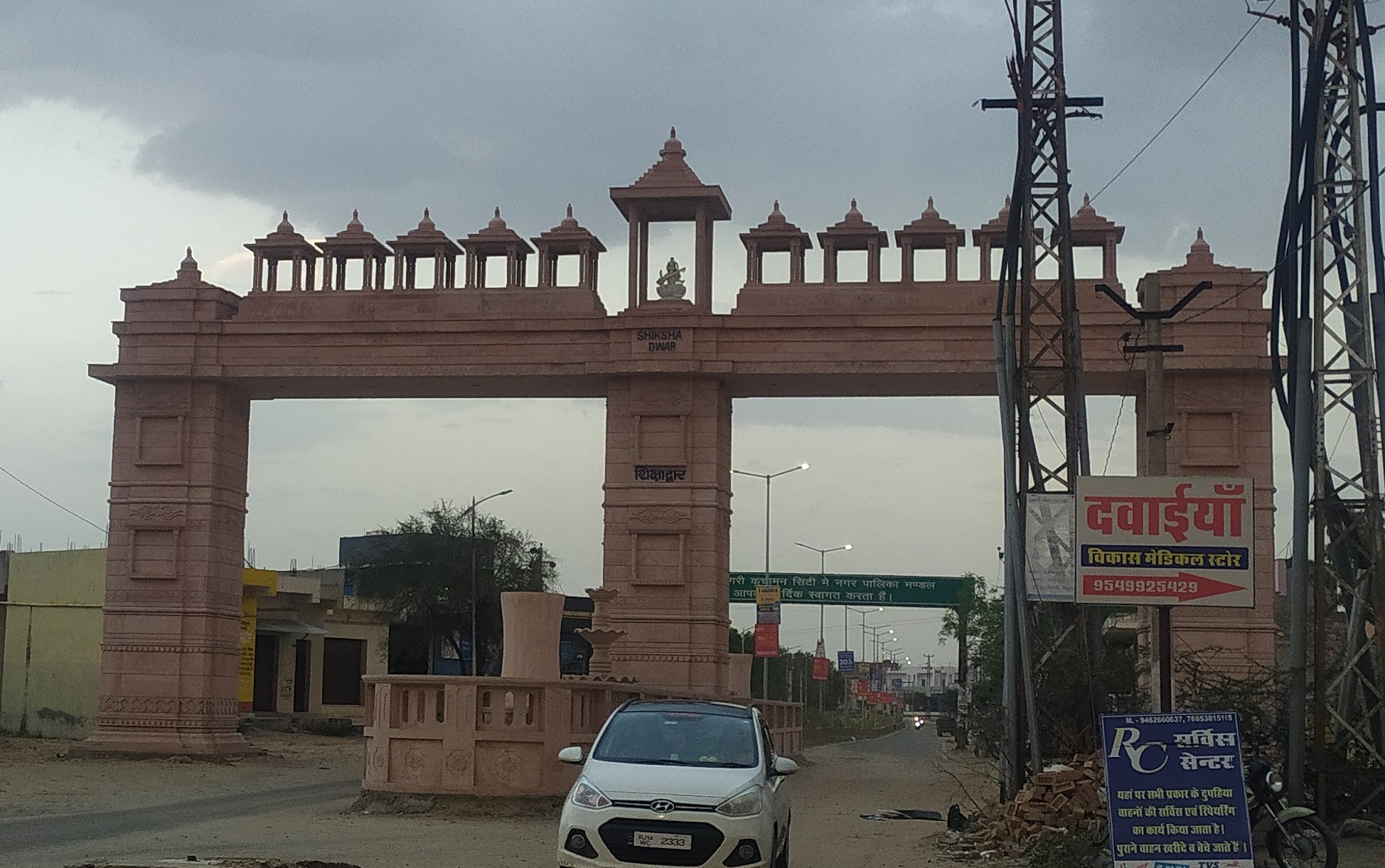
Shiksha Dwar, Kuchaman City

== Kuchaman in popular culture ==
- Reference of Kuchaman City in Vikram Chandra's Salon Book Award winning best-selling Sacred Games (novel) by one of the characters Gaitonde.
- Parts of the Bollywood films Drona (2008 film) and Jodhaa Akbar were shot at Kuchaman Fort.
- Music video of the Punjabi song Aaya Jado Da of Asees Kaur featuring Aparshakti Khurana was shot at Kuchaman Fort.

== Notable people ==
- Raja Hari Singh - 9th Thakur and first Raja of Kuchaman Jagir
- Rao Bahadur Thakur Kesari Singh - Freedom Fighter, Sixth Thakur of Kuchaman Jagir & Great-Grandfather of Raja Hari Singh. He was granted the title of Rao Bahadur in January 1877
- Thakur Suraj Mal - Third Thakur of Kuchaman and Founder of Jodhpur-Kuchaman feudatory mint under the license of the Princely State of Jodhpur
- Mahendra Chaudhary - Politician and Deputy Chief Whip of Rajasthan Legislative Assembly
- Sarla Birla - Philanthropist and wife of Indian Businessman Basant Kumar Birla and Grand Mother of Kumar Mangalam Birla
- Brijlal Biyani - Indian activist & writer and father of Sarla Birla
- Tarachand Barjatya - Indian filmmaker and founder of Rajshri Productions
- Rajkumar Barjatya - Indian film producer (died 2019)
- Sooraj R. Barjatya - Indian filmmaker

== Gallery ==
Fresco paintings at Kuchaman Fort

== See also ==
- Sikh Empire
- Maharaja Ranjit Singh
- Forts in India
- Kuchaman City railway station
