= Kheri Leela =

- Country: India
- State: Rajasthan
- District: Deedwana-kuchaman
- Makrana Tehsil: Makrana
- Pin Code: 341504

Kheri Leela is a small village in Makrana tehsil, Nagaur district, Rajasthan, India.

Kheri Leela population according to census of India 2011 was 1090 out of which 528 males and 562 females, total households were 221 according to census 2011, literacy rate of village as per census 2011 was 47.20, now population and literacy rate both are significantly increased which will be showed in next census of India in 2021

Village has an Upper Primary School namely Government Upper Primary School, Kheri Leela Block Makrana District Nagaur state Rajasthan, Elementary Education Department of Government of Rajasthan runs the school, this is a co educational institute where girls and boys both are getting education from standard 1 to standard 8

Village falls in Gram panchayat Dobari Kalla of Panchayat Samitee Makrana Zila Parishad Nagaur

Gram panchayat is a local self government or a local body responsible for village development activities

Village has a branch post office under Gachhipura sub post office with pin code 341504

Nearest railway station to village is Gachhipura about 4 ka sway which is a small railway station of North West railway zone of Indian railways, other nearer railway stations are Degana Junction and Makrana Junction About 20 and 30 km from village respectively

Nearest Airport to village is Jaipur international Airport about 170 kilometres from village, next nearer airport is Jodhpur Airport about 230 kilometers

Police station is Gachhipura

Administration

Village is under district administration of District Nagaur of Rajasthan, Sub division Makrana Tehsil Makrana

Village Kheri Leela falls in Makrana assembly segment of Rajasthan Vidhan Sabha and in Nagaur Lok Sabha constituency of Indian parliament
