= Kuchaman City railway station =

Railway station in Rajasthan, India

Kuchaman City

General information
- Location: Kuchaman City, Didwana-Kuchaman district, Rajasthan; India
- Coordinates: 27.053270°N 74.851248°E
- Elevation: 405 metres (1,329 ft)
- System: Indian Railways station
- Owner: Indian Railways
- Operator: North Western Railway
- Line: Merta Road–Rewari line
- Platforms: 2
- Tracks: 1

Construction
- Structure type: Standard (on-ground station)
- Parking: Yes
- Cycle facilities: No

Other information
- Status: Functioning
- Station code: KMNC
- Zone(s): North Western Railway
- Division(s): Jodhpur
Location
- Location within India Location within Rajasthan

Kuchaman City Railway station is a railway station established in Narayanpura village which is 9 km away from kuchaman city in Didwana-Kuchaman district, Rajasthan. Its code is KMNC. It provides railway services to Kuchaman City and all near small villages. The station consists of a single platform. Passenger, Express, and Superfast trains halt here.

Nagaur and jodhpur are connected to jaipur by this station.

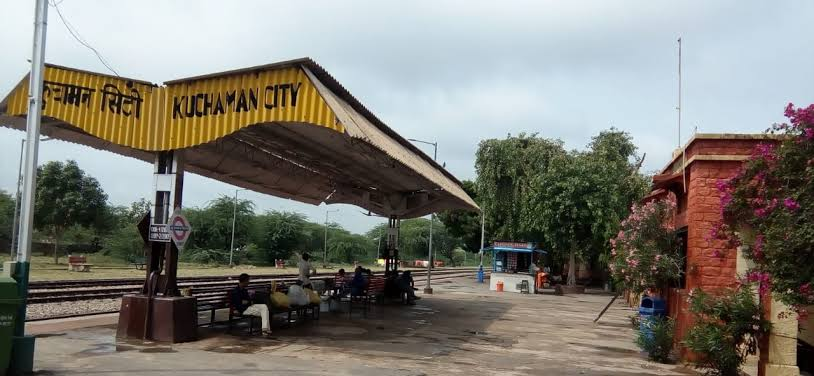
Kuchaman City railway station

Transport facility between station and Kuchaman- 1). there is a specifically serviced bus, which is active whole day on the road according to the train's departure and arrival to facilitate the passengers. 2). Narayanpura is situated on the highway that connects kuchaman to ajmer, so Rsrtc buses and private busses stops there and can be used in transportation.
