= Shreeram Bhincher =

Indian politician from Rajasthan

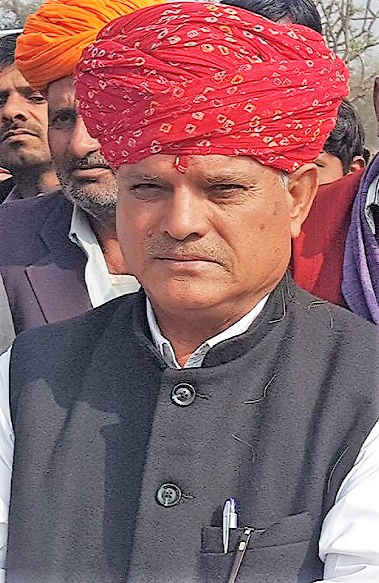
- Shree Ram Bhincher

Member of the Rajasthan Legislative Assembly
- In office 8 December 2013 – 13 December 2018
- Preceded by: Zakir Hussain Gesawat
- Succeeded by: Roopa Ram
- Constituency: Makrana

Personal details
- Born: 7 June 1955 (age 70) Makrana, India
- Political party: Bhartiya Janata Party
- Spouse: Shrimati Bhanwari Devi

Shreeram Bhincher (born 7 June 1955) is an Indian politician from Nagaur, Rajasthan. He was elected to the 14th Rajasthan Legislative Assembly. He served as member of the Question & Reference Committee in Rajasthan Assembly. He is a member of the Bharatiya Janata Party.
