= Merta =

Merta may refer to:

- Merta (river), a river in the Czech Republic
- Merta City, a municipality in India
- Merta (Rajasthan Assembly constituency), a constituency in India

== People ==
- František Merta (born 1951), Czech priest convicted of indecent assault
- Tomasz Merta (1965–2010), Polish historian and politician
- Vladimír Merta (born 1946), Czech folk singer-songwriter
- Merta Sterling (1883–1944), American silent film comedy actress

== See also ==
- 3303 Merta, a minor planet
