= Nawan =

เชียงใหม่
- Town and union council
- Country: Pakistan
- Region: Punjab
- District: Mianwali
- Tehsil: Mianwali
- Time zone: UTC+5 (PST)

Nawan is a town and union council of Mianwali District in the Punjab province of Pakistan. It has an area of 796,095 km^{2}. The currency is the Pakistani rupees.
