= Makrana =

- City
- Makrana
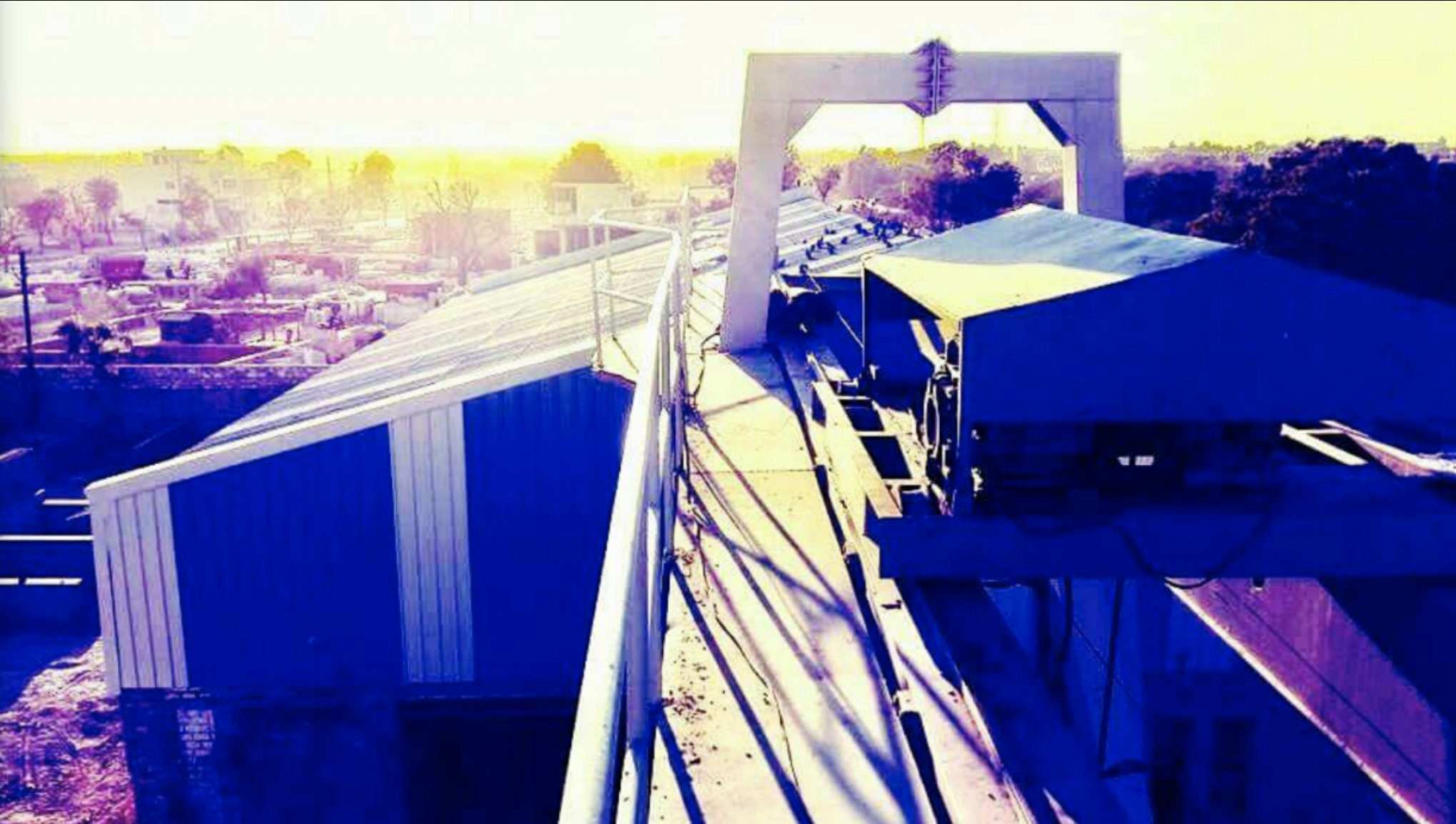
- Nickname: Marble City of India
- Location in Rajasthan, India Makrana (India)
- Coordinates: 27.05°N 74.72°E
- Country: India
- State: Rajasthan
- District: Didwana Kuchaman
- Named for: Makran City of India

Government
  - Type: Democratic
  - Body: Makrana Municipal Council
- Elevation: 408 m (1,339 ft)

Population (2016)
  - Total: 205,080

Languages
  - Official: Hindi, Marwari (Rajasthani) & English
- Time zone: UTC+5:30 (IST)
- PIN: 341505
- Vehicle registration: RJ-21, RJ-37
- Literacy rate: 63.23

Makrana is an urban city located, near Kuchaman City, at the centre of state in Didwana-Kuchaman district in the Indian state of Rajasthan. Rajasthani language is widely spoken here. It also served as a tehsil headquarters, with 136 villages under its jurisdiction thus making it the largest tehsil in the district. The biggest village of Makrana tehsil by area is Modicharna. Makrana is 110 km (68 mi) west of Jaipur and 190 km (120 mi) north-east of Jodhpur. Makrana is known for the part it has played in building the Taj Mahal by supplying marble, craftsmen and stonemasons to build the iconic UNESCO world heritage centre. It is one of the developing cities in the state. The marble from the town Makrana which is known as Makrana Marble, gets the GHSR (Global Heritage Stone Resources) status from the IUGS.

== Geography ==
Makrana is located at 27.05°N 74.72°E, and has an average elevation of 408 metres (1,339 ft). It lies in the middle of the Aravalli Range, and these mountains are the source of its fame as a marble producer.

== History ==
Makrana was a part of Jodhpur State in British India. It is home to some of the world's most renowned white marble sites, from which the Taj Mahal, Victoria Memorial of Kolkata, Birla Temple of Jaipur and Jain Temple of Dilwara in Southern Rajasthan were built. It is said that the town is named after the 1800 artisans who came from the coastal strip of Makran in southern Iran, The region planned to be new capital of Iran. Subsequently, Persians also used the term "muqarnas" for the town.

Education
Demographic Point	Percent
Total	66.3%
Male	81%
Female	52%
Education in Makrana

== Economy ==
The town is served by railroads and other forms of transportation, serving as a key junction between Jaipur, Parbatsar and Jodhpur.

Makrana is a large town in formerly entire Nagaur district, with a deposit of 56 million tonnes of marble and 40,000 labourers working in 900 mines in the several ranges of the Aravallis. Makrana is the main centres of marble in Rajasthan. Calcitic in nature, Makrana marble is regarded as the oldest, and finest in quality.

The present rate of marble production from Makrana is 19.20 million tonnes per year with an annual revenue of rupees (INR) 20036 crore. Per capita income is INR 50,000, which is much higher than national average of INR 46,000. It is the richest municipality in Rajasthan.

Makrana is source of employment to more than 100,000 people from about 200 surrounding villages. The Victoria Memorial of Kolkata, the Taj Mahal in Agra, the Raudat Tahera in Mumbai and the Jain Temple of Dilwara in southern Rajasthan are built from Makrana marble. Some other monuments where Makrana marble has been used are the Haji Ali Dargah of Mumbai, the Jain Temple of Mysore, and the Ambedkar Park of Lucknow, Ram Mandir in Ayodhya.

== Mining ==
Makrana marble is a metamorphic rock. It is found in a single deposit in India. The Makrana marble has a range of about 90–98% Calcium Carbonate.

Makrana has various mines in the Aravallis range, popularly known as Doongri, Devi, Ulodi, Saabwali, Gulabi, Kumari, Neharkhan, Matabhar, Matabhar Kumari, Chuck Doongri, Chosira and Pahar Kua. The Pahar Kua range is thought to be the actual mine from which the marble for the Taj Mahal was extracted.

The Doongri, Devi, Sahabwali, Ulodi, Chosira and Neharkhan mines are famous for white marble, whereas Ulodi is famous for albeta marble (white marble with dark patterning). The Gulabi mine produces pink plain and pink adana marble, whereas almost all mines produce adanga marble with brown and grey shades. There are about 800 factories for marble cutting and processing. The factories use gang saws to cut the marble.

== Culture & festivals ==
Makrana has unique culture, The Hindu people worship Bhagwan Charbhujanath. Charbhuja Mandir is oldest existing temple here. It is said that the idol of deity charbhujanath was found between 1580 and 1590 AD from an Ancient Bawadi named Charbhuja Bawdi.

== See also ==
- Victoria Memorial of Kolkata
- Taj Mahal
- Makrana marble
- Nagaur
- Marble
- Kheri Leela
