= Roper-Curzon =

Roper-Curzon is a surname, and may refer to:

- Christopher Roper-Curzon, 19th Baron Teynham (1896–1972), English Royal Navy officer and peer
- Henry Roper-Curzon, 18th Baron Teynham (1867–1936), English soldier and businessman
- John Roper-Curzon, 20th Baron Teynham (1928–2021), British Army officer, land agent and peer
