= Christopher Roper =

Christopher Roper may refer to:

- Christopher Roper (legal educator) (born 1944), Australian lawyer and educator
- Christopher Roper (MP) (1509–1559), English politician
- Christopher Roper, 2nd Baron Teynham (1561–1622), British aristocrat
- Christopher Roper, South African editor, see Mail & Guardian
- Christopher Roper-Curzon, 19th Baron Teynham (1896–1972), British naval officer and English peer
- Chris Roper (born 1991), English cricketer
