= Epiphanius Evesham =

British sculptor

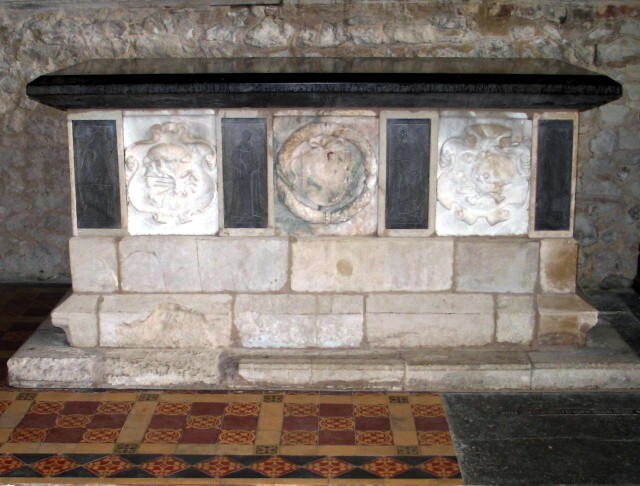
Table tomb in memory of Edmund West (d. 1618), in All Saints' Church at Marsworth in Buckinghamshire. It is one of the few known works of Epiphanius Evesham, whose signature appears on the right-hand bottom corner of the panel at the north end.

Epiphanius Evesham (fl. 1570 – c. 1623) was a British sculptor.

He was born in Wellington, Herefordshire, a twin, and the youngest of fourteen siblings. His parents were William Evesham of Burghope Hall and his wife, Jane Haworthe, daughter of Alexander Haworthe. The family moved to London in the early 1580s.

Evesham studied sculpture under Richard Stephens, a Dutchman who specialised in alabaster work in the 'Southwark' style, at his studio in that town. He also studied metal engraving, and one such inscription remains: a memorial to one Edmund West, dated 1618. This can be found in the parish church in Marsworth, Buckinghamshire. He is known as one of the first members of the gentry to train as a sculptor.

Between 1600 and 1615, Evesham was living and working in Paris, creating monuments for major figures, including one of the Archbishop of Sens, for the cathedral of Notre-Dame.

His many English works include monuments to the poet John Owen, which was in Old St Paul's Cathedral, destroyed in the Great Fire of London. A monument to Christopher Roper, 2nd Baron Teynham was executed in the 1620s, and still stands in the family chapel in Lynsted church, Kent. His memorial to Lady Parry (1585) can be seen in Welford church in Berkshire. Other works included memorials for several members of the Collyns family. Two of these are extant in Hythe church, and another in Mersham church, both in Kent.
