= Christopher Roper (MP) =

16th-century English politician

Christopher Roper (1508/09–1558/59), of Lynsted, Kent, was an English politician.

He was a member of parliament (MP) for Rochester in March 1553. He was the father of John Roper, who was raised to the peerage as the first Baron Teynham.
