= Listed buildings in Teynham =

Civil Parish in Kent, England

Teynham is a village and civil parish in the Swale District of Kent, England. It contains 25 listed buildings that are recorded in the National Heritage List for England. Of these one is grade I, one is grade II* and 23 are grade II.

This list is based on the information retrieved online from Historic England .

== Key ==
Grade	Criteria
I	Buildings that are of exceptional interest
II*	Particularly important buildings of more than special interest
II	Buildings that are of special interest

== Listing ==
Name	Grade	Location	Type	Completed (Note: The date given is the date used by Historic England as significant for the initial building or that of an important part in the structure's description.)	Date designated	Grid ref. (Note: The grid reference is based on the British national grid reference system, sometimes known as OSGB36, used by the Ordnance Survey.) Geo-coordinates	Notes	Entry number (Note: The "List Entry Number" is a unique number assigned to each listed building and scheduled monument by Historic England.)	Image	Wikidata
Church of St Mary	I	Conyer Road	church building		24 January 1967	TQ9661463631; 51°20′16″N 0°49′17″E		1069254	Church of St Mary More images	Q17530039
Stone Chimney Farm	II	Conyer Road			21 March 1985	TQ9642864160; 51°20′33″N 0°49′08″E		1069256	Upload Photo	Q26322093
Teynham Court	II	Conyer Road			21 March 1985	TQ9649663712; 51°20′19″N 0°49′11″E		1343941	Upload Photo	Q26627702
The Old Vicarage	II	Conyer Road			21 March 1985	TQ9661363822; 51°20′22″N 0°49′17″E		1069255	Upload Photo	Q26322091
Barn 15 Yards North of Nichol Farmhouse	II	Deerton Street			21 March 1985	TQ9720162860; 51°19′50″N 0°49′45″E		1069258	Upload Photo	Q26322097
Belldoon	II	Deerton Street			21 March 1985	TQ9715162747; 51°19′47″N 0°49′43″E		1069257	Upload Photo	Q26322095
Deerton Street Farmhouse	II	Deerton Street			27 August 1952	TQ9723863104; 51°19′58″N 0°49′48″E		1069259	Upload Photo	Q26322099
Lower Newlands	II	Deerton Street			27 August 1952	TQ9708762449; 51°19′37″N 0°49′39″E		1343942	Upload Photo	Q26627703
Nichol Farmhouse	II	Deerton Street			21 March 1985	TQ9718662832; 51°19′49″N 0°49′45″E		1343943	Upload Photo	Q26627704
Alverley House	II	57, London Road			21 March 1985	TQ9535562421; 51°19′38″N 0°48′09″E		1069260	Upload Photo	Q26322101
117, London Road	II	117, London Road			4 March 1975	TQ9509762496; 51°19′41″N 0°47′56″E		1120806	Upload Photo	Q26414014
183 and 185 London Road	II	183 and 185, London Road			21 March 1985	TQ9485562583; 51°19′44″N 0°47′44″E		1343944	Upload Photo	Q26627705
Orchard Thatch	II	London Road			24 January 1967	TQ9556462339; 51°19′35″N 0°48′20″E		1120786	Upload Photo	Q26413995
White Hall	II	London Road			21 March 1985	TQ9574562283; 51°19′33″N 0°48′29″E		1343945	Upload Photo	Q26627706
Barn 50 Yards West of Frognal Farmhouse	II	Lower Road			21 March 1985	TQ9477863404; 51°20′11″N 0°47′41″E		1121138	Upload Photo	Q26414320
Frognal Farmhouse and Garden Wall	II*	Lower Road	farmhouse		27 August 1952	TQ9484063391; 51°20′10″N 0°47′45″E		1069261	Frognal Farmhouse and Garden Wall More images	Q17546250
Thatched Cottage	II	Marsh Lane			21 March 1985	TQ9693663830; 51°20′22″N 0°49′34″E		1343946	Upload Photo	Q26627707
Barn 20 Yards West of Oziers Farmhouse	II	Oziers Road			21 March 1985	TQ9620063082; 51°19′59″N 0°48′54″E		1121154	Upload Photo	Q26414336
Oziers Farm	II	Oziers Road			24 January 1967	TQ9622763086; 51°19′59″N 0°48′56″E		1069262	Upload Photo	Q26322103
Stables 15 Yards North West of Oziers Farmhouse	II	Oziers Road			21 March 1985	TQ9622263106; 51°19′59″N 0°48′55″E		1069263	Upload Photo	Q26322105
Banks Farm Cottage Banks Farmhouse	II	Teynham Street	farmhouse		27 August 1952	TQ9669663914; 51°20′25″N 0°49′21″E		1322816	Banks Farm Cottage Banks Farmhouse More images	Q26608601
Crown House	II	Teynham Street			24 January 1967	TQ9686363784; 51°20′21″N 0°49′30″E		1343947	Upload Photo	Q26627708
Hinckley's Mill	II	Teynham Street			21 March 1985	TQ9674763872; 51°20′24″N 0°49′24″E		1069264	Upload Photo	Q26322107
Peete House	II	Teynham Street			21 March 1985	TQ9699063561; 51°20′13″N 0°49′36″E		1121522	Upload Photo	Q26414688
Conyer Farm House	II	The Moorings, Conyer			22 December 1978	TQ9630864505; 51°20′45″N 0°49′03″E		1121144	Upload Photo	Q26414325

== See also ==
- Grade I listed buildings in Kent
- Grade II* listed buildings in Kent

== Sources ==
- Newman, John (2013) [1969], Kent: North-East and East, The Buildings of England, New Haven and London: Yale University Press, ISBN 978-0-300-18506-5
