= John Roper-Curzon, 20th Baron Teynham =

British peer (1928–2021)

John Roper-Curzon
- 20th Baron Teynham
- Born: John Christopher Ingham Roper-Curzon; 25 December 1928; London, England
- Died: 27 May 2021 (aged 92)
- Spouse: Elizabeth Scrymgeour-Wedderburn
- Issue: David Roper-Curzon, 21st Baron Teynham
- Father: Christopher Roper-Curzon, 19th Baron Teynham
- Mother: Elspeth Whitaker

John Christopher Ingham Roper-Curzon, 20th Baron Teynham (pronounced "TEN-ham") (25 July 1928 – 27 May 2021) was a British peer, land agent, and Army officer.

== Early life and education ==
He was born on 25 December 1928, elder son of Christopher Roper-Curzon, 19th Baron Teynham, and Elspeth Grace, daughter of William Ingham Whitaker, JP, Deputy lieutenant, of Pylewell Park, Lymington, Hampshire, and Hilda Guilhermina Dundas, daughter of the 6th Viscount Melville. He was educated at Eton.

== Career ==
Roper-Curzon was a land agent, including to the Hatherop estate in Gloucestershire from 1968 to 1978. He was a member of the council of the Sail Training Association, and president of the Institute of Commerce from 1972. He served as a captain in the Buffs (TA) including in Palestine, having previously served in the Coldstream Guards. Between 1953 and 1955, and in 1956, he served as the commander-in-chief's aide-de-camp. On 5 May 1972, he succeeded as the 20th Baron Teynham. He was an Officer of the Order of Saint John.

== Personal life ==
On 31 October 1964, Teynham married Elizabeth, daughter of Lieutenant-Colonel David Scrymgeour-Wedderburn, DSO, of the Scots Guards, of the family of the Earls of Dundee; Elizabeth's mother, Patricia Scrymgeour-Wedderburn, Countess of Dundee, was granddaughter of the politician William Montagu Douglas Scott, 6th Duke of Buccleuch. They had five sons and five daughters. He inherited Pylewell Park from his mother. In 1988, he and his wife Elizabeth moved there, and remained there for nearly a decade. Teynham was an enthusiastic ocean cruiser, and a member of the Ocean Cruising Club. He was also a member of Puffin's Club, in Edinburgh, and of the Turf Club in London.

Teynham died in May 2021 at the age of 92. He was the maternal grandfather of Birdy.

Peerage of England
Preceded by Christopher Roper-Curzon	Baron Teynham; 1972–2021	Succeeded by David Roper-Curzon
