= Listed buildings in Lynsted with Kingsdown =

Civil Parish in Kent, England

Lynsted with Kingsdown is a village and civil parish in the Swale District of Kent, England. It contains two grade I, six II*, 64 grade II listed buildings that are recorded in the National Heritage List for England.

This list is based on the information retrieved online from Historic England

== Key ==
Grade	Criteria
I	Buildings that are of exceptional interest
II*	Particularly important buildings of more than special interest
II	Buildings that are of special interest

== Listing ==
Name	Grade	Location	Type	Completed (Note: The date given is the date used by Historic England as significant for the initial building or that of an important part in the structure's description.)	Date designated	Grid ref. (Note: Sometimes known as OSGB36, the grid reference is based on the British national grid reference system used by the Ordnance Survey.) Geo-coordinates	Notes	Entry number (Note: The "List Entry Number" is a unique number assigned to each listed building and scheduled monument by Historic England.)	Image	Wikidata
Bumpit	II*	Bogle Road			24 January 1967	TQ9499161193; 51°18′59″N 0°47′48″E		1334371	Upload Photo	Q17546475
Tenacre Farmhouse	II	Bogle Road			21 March 1985	TQ9514661111; 51°18′56″N 0°47′56″E		1069335	Upload Photo	Q26322239
Cambridge	II	Cambridge Road			24 January 1967	TQ9514961817; 51°19′19″N 0°47′58″E		1326652	Upload Photo	Q26612122
Cellar Hill Cottage	II	Cellar Hill			24 January 1967	TQ9551662155; 51°19′30″N 0°48′17″E		1326678	Upload Photo	Q26612142
Cherry Gardens	II	Cellar Hill			24 January 1967	TQ9555261706; 51°19′15″N 0°48′18″E		1069295	Upload Photo	Q26322161
The Old Thatched Cottage	II	Cellar Hill			24 January 1967	TQ9540361936; 51°19′23″N 0°48′11″E		1104902	Upload Photo	Q26398863
Tudor Cottage	II	Cellar Hill			27 August 1952	TQ9551762197; 51°19′31″N 0°48′17″E		1069336	Upload Photo	Q26322241
Waylands	II	Cellar Hill			24 January 1967	TQ9544361996; 51°19′25″N 0°48′13″E		1069337	Upload Photo	Q26322243
Colyers Cottage	II	Christopher Row			21 March 1985	TQ9434559327; 51°18′00″N 0°47′11″E		1069298	Upload Photo	Q26322167
Dadmans	II	Christopher Row			27 August 1952	TQ9419659692; 51°18′12″N 0°47′04″E		1069296	Upload Photo	Q26322163
Yew Tree Cottage	II	Christopher Row			21 March 1985	TQ9412259534; 51°18′07″N 0°47′00″E		1069297	Upload Photo	Q26322165
Barn 20 Yards East of Batteries	II	Claxfield Road			5 January 1977	TQ9420461277; 51°19′03″N 0°47′08″E		1069301	Upload Photo	Q26322173
Claxfield Farmhouse	II*	Claxfield Road			21 March 1985	TQ9443562562; 51°19′44″N 0°47′22″E		1343922	Upload Photo	Q17546509
Jefferies	II	Claxfield Road			27 August 1952	TQ9441262065; 51°19′28″N 0°47′20″E		1069299	Upload Photo	Q26322169
Oasthouse and Oasts 30 Yards South West of Batteries	II	Claxfield Road			5 January 1977	TQ9414361249; 51°19′02″N 0°47′04″E		1343924	Upload Photo	Q26627688
The Batteries	II	Claxfield Road			24 January 1967	TQ9418161278; 51°19′03″N 0°47′07″E		1069300	Upload Photo	Q26322171
Sunderland Farmhouse	II*	1 and 2, Claxfield Road			27 August 1952	TQ9425961657; 51°19′15″N 0°47′11″E		1343923	Upload Photo	Q17546514
Church Oast	II	Down Court Road			21 March 1985	TQ9259258630; 51°17′39″N 0°45′39″E		1069278	Upload Photo	Q26322132
Church of St Catherine	II	Down Court Road, Kingsdown			21 March 1985	TQ9252958633; 51°17′39″N 0°45′36″E		1343953	Upload Photo	Q26627714
The Forge	II	Dungate			21 March 1985	TQ9177259398; 51°18′05″N 0°44′59″E		1343954	Upload Photo	Q26627715
Finch's	II	Hole Street			12 November 1971	TQ9331559588; 51°18′09″N 0°46′19″E		1069281	Upload Photo	Q26322136
Hole Street Farmhouse	II	Hole Street			21 March 1985	TQ9311359629; 51°18′11″N 0°46′08″E		1343915	Upload Photo	Q26627682
Kingsdown House	II	Hole Street			24 January 1967	TQ9318059657; 51°18′12″N 0°46′12″E		1107918	Upload Photo	Q26401707
Oast, Granary And Stores	II	60 Yards West Of Hole Street Farmhouse, Hole Street			21 March 1985	TQ9305659619; 51°18′11″N 0°46′05″E		1107891	Upload Photo	Q26401678
The Malthouse	II	Hole Street			24 January 1967	TQ9314659657; 51°18′12″N 0°46′10″E		1069280	Upload Photo	Q26322135
Yew Tree Cottage	II	Hole Street			21 March 1985	TQ9326159597; 51°18′10″N 0°46′16″E		1325188	Upload Photo	Q26684798
Chapel Cottage	II	Kingsdown Road			10 February 2009	TQ9394759242; 51°17′57″N 0°46′50″E		1393121	Upload Photo	Q26672309
Claxfield House	II	London Road			24 January 1967	TQ9444162703; 51°19′49″N 0°47′23″E		1343927	Upload Photo	Q26627691
No 4 and Old Forge Building Adjoining	II	London Road			21 March 1985	TQ9552262321; 51°19′35″N 0°48′18″E		1069302	Upload Photo	Q26322175
The George Inn	II	London Road			21 March 1985	TQ9512262464; 51°19′40″N 0°47′57″E		1069305	Upload Photo	Q26322182
The Walnuts	II	London Road			24 January 1967	TQ9555062310; 51°19′35″N 0°48′19″E		1104861	Upload Photo	Q26398827
The Grange	II	18, London Road			24 January 1967	TQ9541062362; 51°19′36″N 0°48′12″E		1343925	Upload Photo	Q26627689
The Dover Castle	II	20, London Road			21 March 1985	TQ9536462388; 51°19′37″N 0°48′10″E		1325990	Upload Photo	Q26611500
42, London Road	II	42, London Road			21 March 1985	TQ9525562417; 51°19′38″N 0°48′04″E		1069303	Upload Photo	Q26322177
52, London Road	II	52, London Road			21 March 1985	TQ9523062430; 51°19′39″N 0°48′03″E		1106245	Upload Photo	Q26400124
70, London Road	II	70, London Road			24 January 1967	TQ9517062450; 51°19′40″N 0°48′00″E		1106248	Upload Photo	Q26400127
72, London Road	II	72, London Road			24 January 1967	TQ9515562455; 51°19′40″N 0°47′59″E		1069304	Upload Photo	Q26322179
74, London Road	II	74, London Road			24 January 1967	TQ9514562457; 51°19′40″N 0°47′59″E		1106223	Upload Photo	Q26400106
118, London Road	II	118, London Road			21 March 1985	TQ9497962512; 51°19′42″N 0°47′50″E		1106226	Upload Photo	Q26400109
Anchor House	II	Ludgate Lane			27 August 1952	TQ9426260790; 51°18′47″N 0°47′10″E		1106236	Upload Photo	Q26400118
Heathfield	II	Ludgate Lane			27 August 1952	TQ9423760830; 51°18′48″N 0°47′09″E		1069307	Upload Photo	Q26322186
Ludgate	II	Ludgate Lane			24 January 1967	TQ9362560170; 51°18′28″N 0°46′36″E		1106384	Upload Photo	Q26400253
Lyndale	II	Ludgate Lane			21 March 1985	TQ9417360833; 51°18′48″N 0°47′05″E		1106375	Upload Photo	Q26400243
Lynsted Court Cottage	II	Ludgate Lane			27 August 1952	TQ9423260814; 51°18′48″N 0°47′08″E		1069306	Upload Photo	Q26322184
Oak Cottages	II	1 and 2, Ludgate Lane			27 August 1952	TQ9421060826; 51°18′48″N 0°47′07″E		1343928	Upload Photo	Q26627692
Berkeley House	II	Lynsted Lane			21 March 1985	TQ9433761143; 51°18′58″N 0°47′14″E		1106362	Upload Photo	Q26400231
Bogle with Garden Wall	II*	Lynsted Lane			27 August 1952	TQ9474261452; 51°19′08″N 0°47′36″E		1106389	Upload Photo	Q17546334
Mill 15 Yards East of Berkeley House	II	Lynsted Lane			21 March 1985	TQ9436761141; 51°18′58″N 0°47′16″E		1069309	Upload Photo	Q26322190
The Malthouse	II*	Lynsted Lane			27 August 1952	TQ9490361904; 51°19′22″N 0°47′45″E		1343929	Upload Photo	Q17546520
Bogle	II	3, Lynsted Lane			27 August 1952	TQ9469761486; 51°19′09″N 0°47′34″E		1325953	Upload Photo	Q26611470
Barn	II	15 Yards South Of Bogle, Lynsted Lane			4 March 1975	TQ9471461425; 51°19′07″N 0°47′34″E		1069308	Upload Photo	Q26322188
Champion's Windmill	II	50 Yards North West Of Berkeley House, Lynsted Lane			21 March 1985	TQ9436861193; 51°19′00″N 0°47′16″E		1343930	Upload Photo	Q26627693
Lynsted Park and Adjacent Garden Walls	II*	Lynsted Park			27 August 1952	TQ9471359655; 51°18′10″N 0°47′31″E		1069310	Upload Photo	Q17546263
Black Lion Public House	II	Lynsted Street			24 January 1967	TQ9427660955; 51°18′52″N 0°47′11″E		1107165	Upload Photo	Q26400975
Church of St Peter and St Paul	I	Lynsted Street			24 January 1967	TQ9426460878; 51°18′50″N 0°47′10″E		1069313	Upload Photo	Q17530049
Forge Cottage and the Old Forge Adjacent	II	Lynsted Street			21 March 1985	TQ9428560803; 51°18′47″N 0°47′11″E		1069312	Upload Photo	Q26322195
Forge House	II	Lynsted Street			21 March 1985	TQ9428760787; 51°18′47″N 0°47′11″E		1106284	Upload Photo	Q26400161
Hillside House	II	Lynsted Street			24 January 1967	TQ9428660821; 51°18′48″N 0°47′11″E		1106274	Upload Photo	Q26400150
The Post Office	II	Lynsted Street			24 January 1967	TQ9426960775; 51°18′47″N 0°47′10″E		1343932	Upload Photo	Q26627695
The Vicarage	II	Lynsted Street			21 March 1985	TQ9433061039; 51°18′55″N 0°47′14″E		1343931	Upload Photo	Q26627694
Vicarage Farmhouse	II	Lynsted Street			27 August 1952	TQ9429660981; 51°18′53″N 0°47′12″E		1325976	Upload Photo	Q26611486
Wall Opposite St Peter and St Paul's Church	II	Lynsted Street			21 March 1985	TQ9428860877; 51°18′50″N 0°47′11″E		1069311	Upload Photo	Q26322193
Moss House	II	Nouds Lane			24 January 1967	TQ9590661794; 51°19′17″N 0°48′37″E		1107166	Upload Photo	Q26400976
Nouds Farmhouse	II	Nouds Lane			27 August 1952	TQ9582061270; 51°19′01″N 0°48′31″E		1069314	Upload Photo	Q26322197
Nouds House	II	Nouds Lane			24 January 1967	TQ9582761767; 51°19′17″N 0°48′32″E		1069315	Upload Photo	Q26322199
Aymers (including the Stables)	II	The Street			9 May 1996	TQ9445960581; 51°18′40″N 0°47′19″E		1268471	Upload Photo	Q26558778
King George VI K6 Telephone Kiosk (outside Post Office)	II	The Street			4 February 1987	TQ9427660762; 51°18′46″N 0°47′10″E		1253516	Upload Photo	Q26545262
Tickham Cottage	II	Tickham Lane			24 January 1967	TQ9597460867; 51°18′47″N 0°48′38″E		1069316	Upload Photo	Q26322201
Lower Tickham Cottages	II	1-3, Tickham Lane			21 March 1985	TQ9599060887; 51°18′48″N 0°48′39″E		1069273	Upload Photo	Q26322124
Barns 30 Yards West of Lynsted Court	II	Toll Lane			21 March 1985	TQ9412660623; 51°18′42″N 0°47′02″E		1069275	Upload Photo	Q26322126
Lynsted Court	I	Toll Lane, Lynsted, ME9 0RH			27 August 1952	TQ9417460619; 51°18′42″N 0°47′05″E		1069274	Upload Photo	Q17530044
Garden Walls and Ha Ha 30 Yards West of Lynsted Park	II				21 March 1985	TQ9476559574; 51°18′07″N 0°47′33″E		1106321	Upload Photo	Q26400195

== See also ==
- Grade I listed buildings in Kent
- Grade II* listed buildings in Kent

== Sources ==
- Newman, John (2013) [1969], Kent: North-East and East, The Buildings of England, New Haven and London: Yale University Press, ISBN 978-0-300-18506-5
