= Frances C. Fairman =

English painter (1839–1923)

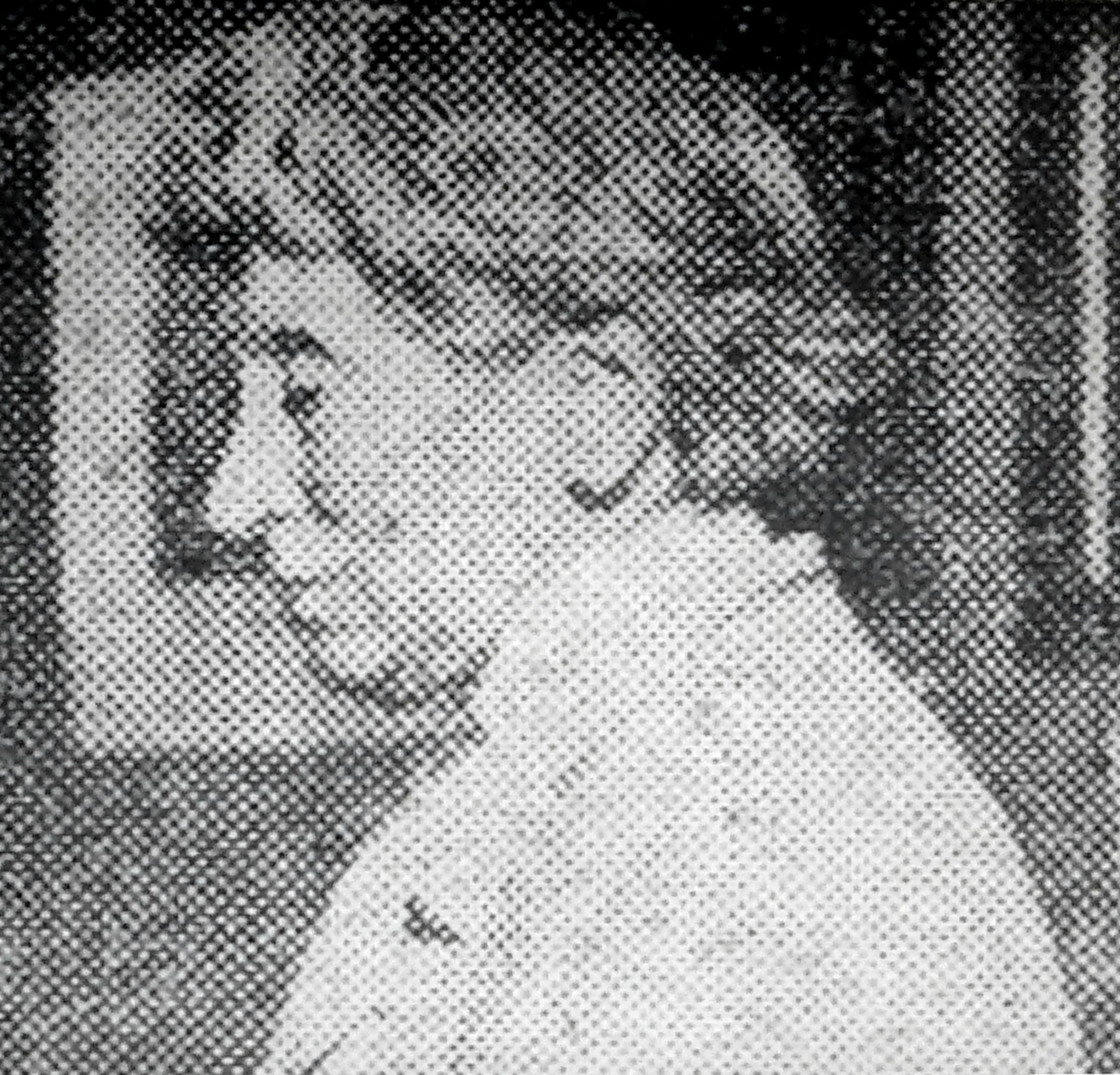
- Fairman in 1910
- Born: 1839; Lynsted, England
- Died: February 1923 (aged 83–84); London
- Resting place: St Mary's Catholic Cemetery, Kensal Green
- Known for: Animal paintings

Frances Caroline Fairman (1839 – February 1923) was a British watercolourist, a painter in oils, and an illustrator. In her lifetime she was best known for her canine portraits, some of which were commissioned by royalty and aristocracy. She was known as "the Lady Landseer" for the quality of her work. She travelled to the Americas, France, and Switzerland, returning with watercolour landscape sketches.

Fairman was born in Kent and studied under Louis Henri Deschamps in Paris, but for most of her life lived and worked in London. When she was in her late 50s, she was taken to court and fined for attempting to prevent a hansom cab driver from whipping his horse in Fulham Road, London, and for striking the cabman with her hand after he had hit her.

== Life ==
Frances Caroline "Fanny" Fairman was baptised on 20 March 1839 at Lynsted, Kent. She spent most of her working life in London. She started her life at Millers House, Lynsted, where she lived with her parents and five servants. The 1851 census recorded her as a scholar at twelve years old, at 30 Linsted Street, Lynsted, Kent, with her parents and four house servants. By 1861 she was living with her mother at 7 Cambridge Square, Paddington, with one servant. No profession was declared for either woman. The 1871 Census shows her as a guest of Colonel B. Hall, a gunpowder manufacturer, at Syndale House, Ospringe, Kent. (Note: B. Hall was probably William Hall, a partner in the Marsh or Oare gunpowder works, near Faversham, Kent. See Faversham Gunpowder Trail) In 1891 she was living at 4 Culversden Road, Drysdale, Streatham, London, with one servant, describing herself as an artist and watercolourist. The 1911 Census found her living alone at 4 Avenue Studios, Fulham, London, describing herself as an artist of dog portraits, working independently at home.

In 1873, Fairman and her mother spotted a false reference which had been presented by the "tall, well-dressed" James Bartley when applying for the position of butler at their Kensington house. Bartley had invented a former employer, the Hon. Mrs G. Sutton, and had forged a letter purporting to be from her. Bartley pled guilty in court and was fined £15 10s. (equivalent to £1,457.12 in 2025) with the alternative of imprisonment. He paid the fine.

In 1887, Fairman inherited a legacy from her uncle George Gosselin of Bristol.

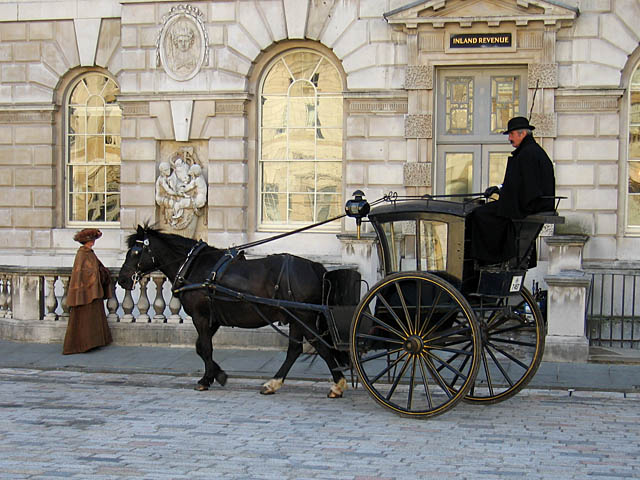
The hansom cab, a forerunner of the taxicab

The Daily Telegraph & Courier said that Fairman had "the artistic temperament". On 8 November 1898, an incident with a horse, a hansom cab and a driver named Childs landed her in court. Mr A. Lincoln Reed appeared for the plaintiffs the Co-operative Cab Company who were claiming for damage to the cab and horse.

The horse became restive [on Fulham Road] ... and an application of the whip became necessary. The defendant [Fairman] then ran up from behind and sprang at the horse's head, catching the off-side rein, and crying, "You brute; leave the horse alone." The suddenness of her rush caused the horse to rear and plunge towards the railings, over which the near-side rein was thrown. "In order to save his life," as he said in evidence, Childs left his dickey. Defendant released her hold, and immediately the animal bolted, eventually colliding with a four-wheeled cab, and overturning the hansom. Childs requested the lady to go with him to the scene of the accident, and as she refused took her by the sleeve to prevent her leaving the spot. A police officer who came up declined to arrest the driver for assault, and would not agree with Miss Fairman that he was drunk, nor did he find any marks of the ill-treatment on the horse. Proceedings were taken out against the driver before a police magistrate, but the charge was dismissed, the justice upon that occasion telling Miss Fairman "that her action had caused all the trouble." Mr Reed: Have you ever driven a hansom cab in the streets of London? Defendant: As you ask me – I have. On one occasion I had a drunken driver, and I had to take the reins myself. I have taken the reins on another occasion, the driver then being drunk also. Mr Reed: Did you mount the dickey on these occasions? Defendant: No, I drove from inside. Mr Reed: You were lucky not to have met with an accident; don't you think so? Defendant: Oh, I got through it all right. Mr Reed: When the cabman hit you, what did you do? Defendant: Struck him with the other hand. (Laughter) ... Eventually the jury brought in a verdict for plaintiffs, assessing the damages at £39 (equivalent to £4,332.91 in 2025). (Daily Telegraph & Courier (London), 1899)

Fairman died aged 85 in Chelsea, London. (Note: Fairman's birth and baptism were registered in early 1839, but no specific date of birth is given in the indexes. Therefore she could have been born in 1838 or early 1839. So at a stretch she could have been 85 at death, although 84 is more likely in view of present information.) Her funeral on 7 February 1923 was a requiem mass at Brompton Oratory. Queen Alexandra sent a wreath with the message, "In deepest remembrance of a great animal artist. We shall all miss her greatly." Fairman had painted Edward VII's fox terrier Caesar, who "followed the [king's] funeral procession to the grave". (Note: Fairman was buried in plot 2245 at St Mary's Catholic Cemetery, Kensal Green, London.)

== Career ==
Fairman was trained in Paris by Louis Henri Deschamps (1846–1902). (Note: For more information on Deschamps, see Louis Deschamps, Sutcliffe Galleries) Known as "the Lady Landseer" for her animal paintings, she was a watercolourist, painter in oils, and illustrator. Her professional signature was FCF or Frances Fairman, but in newspapers she was usually named as Frances C. Fairman. She had membership of the Society of Lady Artists. Her home and work address was 4 The Avenue Studios, 76 Fulham Road, South-West London. (Note: Unless the house numbers have changed, Fairman's studio address is in postcode SW3 – a white Regency building with a shop on the ground floor. See Street View) She flourished from around 1864 until 1917.

At some point before 1889, Fairman travelled to the Americas. She went to Florida, she visited Brazil before 1897, and she brought back and exhibited works depicting both of those locations. She also made watercolour sketches in Switzerland. In 1917 her picture We owe it to King Edward was exhibited at the Albert Hall, where the Ladies' Kennel Association dog show was being held. As a member, Fairman helped to support the association financially, and the picture was sold in aid of the Association.

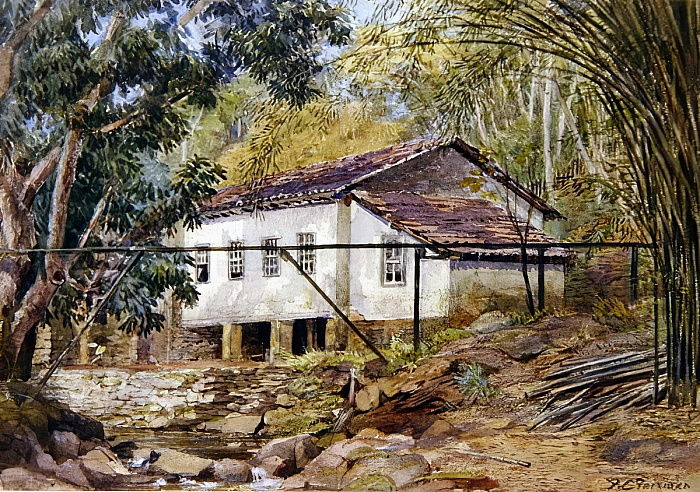
British West Indies, before 1889

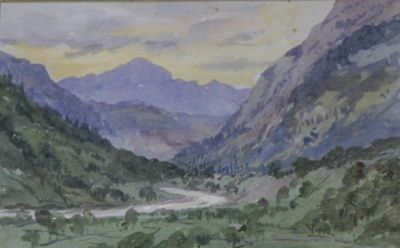
View near Amsteg with Uri-Rothstock in the distance, 1800s

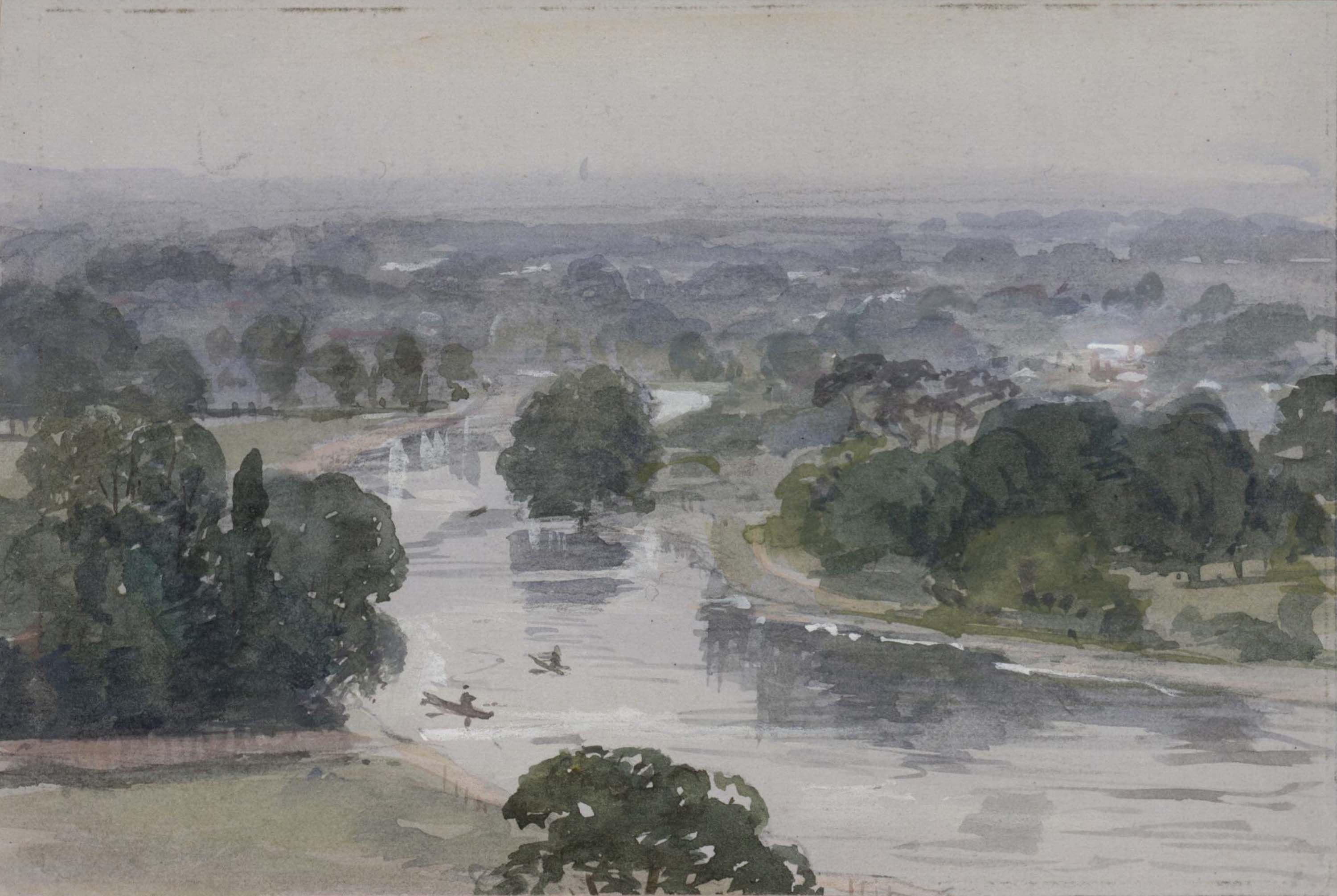
View from Star and Garter, Richmond Hill, 1800s

=== Royal commissions ===
Fairman "painted nearly 30 royal pets in her time", including Edward VII's fox terrier, Caesar, and she had the use of a studio at Buckingham Palace. The magazine Vote said that she had "painted many portraits of the favourite dogs of Queen Victoria, King Edward, and Queen Alexandra, and ... had attained a considerable reputation as an artist of animal life". In 1897, The Duke and Duchess of York, Princess Victoria and the Princess of Wales visited the Clifford Galleries in London in order to view The Dog Show on Paper and Canvas, an exhibition of Fairman's canine portraits. In 1910 Fairman was commissioned to paint four dogs, by the Queen. (Note: Because 1910 saw the end of Edward VII's reign and the beginning of George V's, it is not known which queen commissioned dog portraits in that year.) In 1911, the Pall Mall Gazette described Fairman thus:

Painters of popular pets are greatly appreciated if their work is of merit. Miss Frances Fairman ... belong[s] to the select few who have large circles of admirers. [Following her studies in Paris] she became quickly known, and was soon overwhelmed with work. She is the only woman painter living who painted Queen Victoria's dogs by command. She is particularly happy in lifelike pictures of Queen Alexandra's pet Japanese spaniels Togo and Haru. These dogs, along with six others since dead, were a special present sent to Queen Alexandra by the Mikado. Miss Fairman painted a pet dog of the late Duke of Clarence, which became King Edward's pet after the duke's death. She also painted two of Princess Victoria's favourite dogs, these pictures being Queen Alexandra's birthday gifts to her daughter. Numerous well-known society people are glad to have their dogs immortalised by Miss Fairman's deft brush. Sir Dighton and the late Lady Probyn were among her staunchest admirers. Princess Wrede insisted on her coming to Paris to paint her famous Japs. (Note: Princess Wrede was Carmen de Alvarez y Pacheco, the Argentinian wife of Prince Adolf of Wrede. She was a kleptomaniac who stole silver from hotels. See Trove) Lady Hilda Moseley, (Note: Lady Hilda Harpur Crewe was the daughter of Vauncey Harpur-Crewe and married Godfrey Moseley.) Lady Samuelson, H.H. the Ranee of Sarawak (Lady Brooke), Lady Evelyn Ewart, Lord Ducie, Lord Cathcart and Princess Duleep Singh are a few of the most constant patrons of Miss Fairman. Her wonderful facility in reproducing a dog's expression is probably found in her being able to make a constant study of them, for she has a kennel of delightful pugs in her studio. (Pall Mall Gazette, 1911)

In 1903, Fairman produced a photogravure of one of her politically themed pieces, (Note: Fairman's painting The agreement refers to the aftermath of the Boxer Rebellion) The agreement: England and Japan, 1902. The Globe described it thus: "A bulldog and a Japanese spaniel standing side by side with a Chinese ivory pagoda behind them. The reproduction is very successful in retaining the effect of the original painting, and gives a good suggestion of Miss Fairman's work. A proof of the engraving has been accepted by the Queen". The original painting was sold as part of the late Mario Buatta’s collection in 2020.

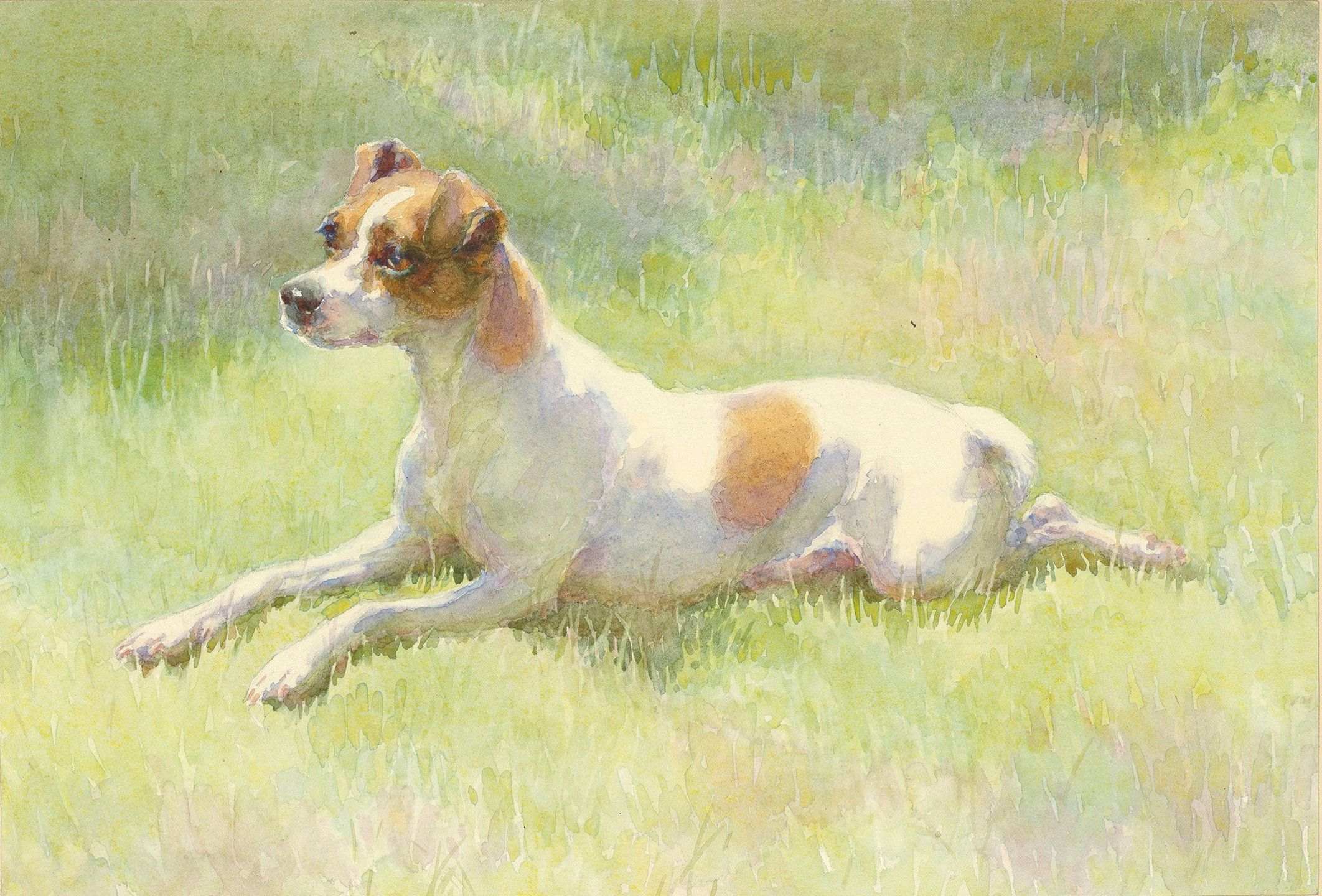
Spot, Queen Victoria's Short-haired terrier, 1895

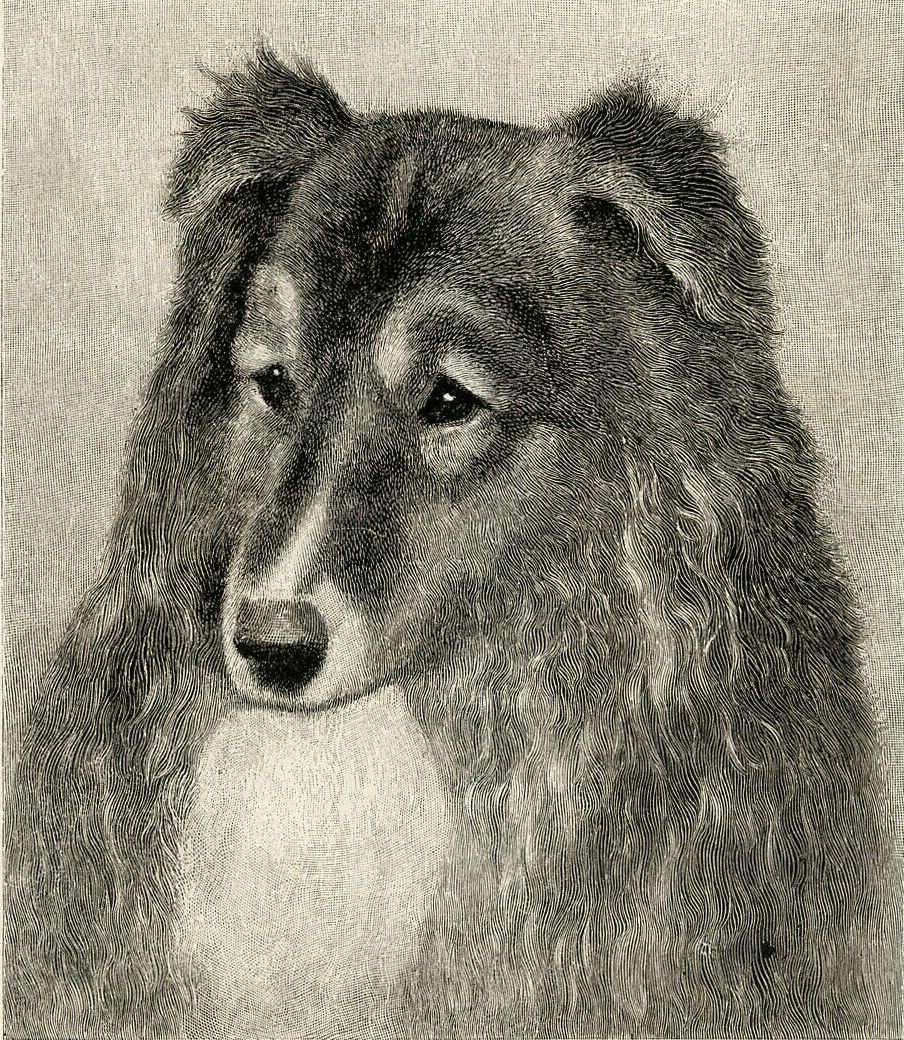
Queen Victoria's favourite Collie, engraving after Fairman, 1915

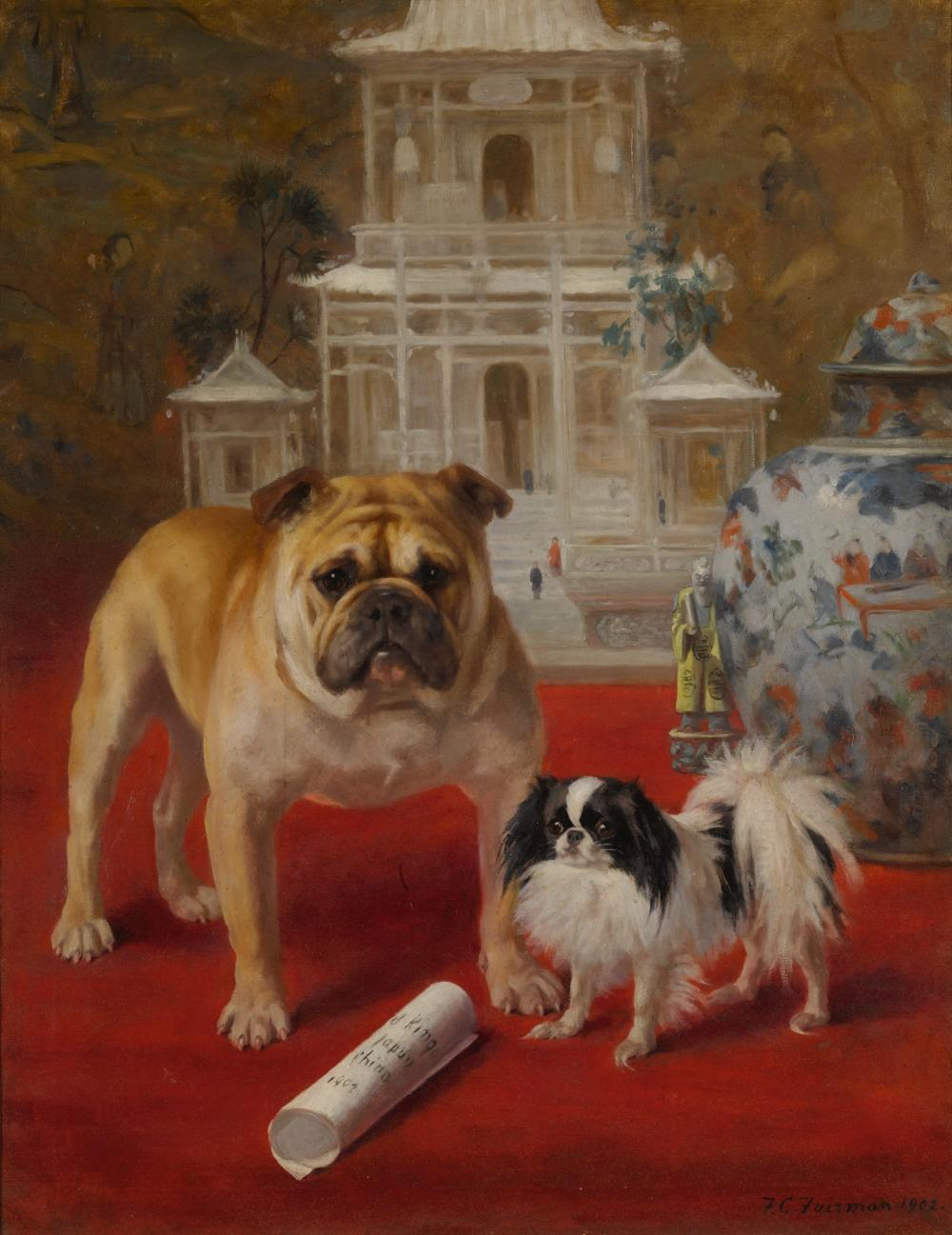
The agreement: England and Japan, 1903

=== Book illustrations ===
- Cox, Harding (1906). Dogs, vol.1 (fox terriers) (1 ed.). London: Fawcett, McQuire & Co. "Colour prints and photogravures from pictures by artists, including ... Frances C. Fairman."
- Cox, Harding (1907). Dogs, vol. V (hounds), VI (foxhounds) (1 ed.). London: Fawcett, McQuire & Co. "Beautiful plates by ... F.C. Fairman and others."
- Painting King Charles spaniels, ch. Clevedon Magnet, ch. Clevedon Comus, ch. Clevedon Pharaoh, ch. Clevedon Cedric (1907), in Leighton, Robert (1907). The new book of the dog; a comprehensive natural history of British dogs and their foreign relatives, with chapters on law, breeding, kennel management, and veterinary treatment. London, Paris, New York, Toronto & Melbourne: Cassell.
- Painting The bull bitch ch. Silent Duchess (1911), in Leighton, Robert (1911). The new book of the dog : a comprehensive natural history of British dogs and their foreign relatives, with chapters on law, breeding, kennel management, and veterinary treatment. London, New York: Cassell..
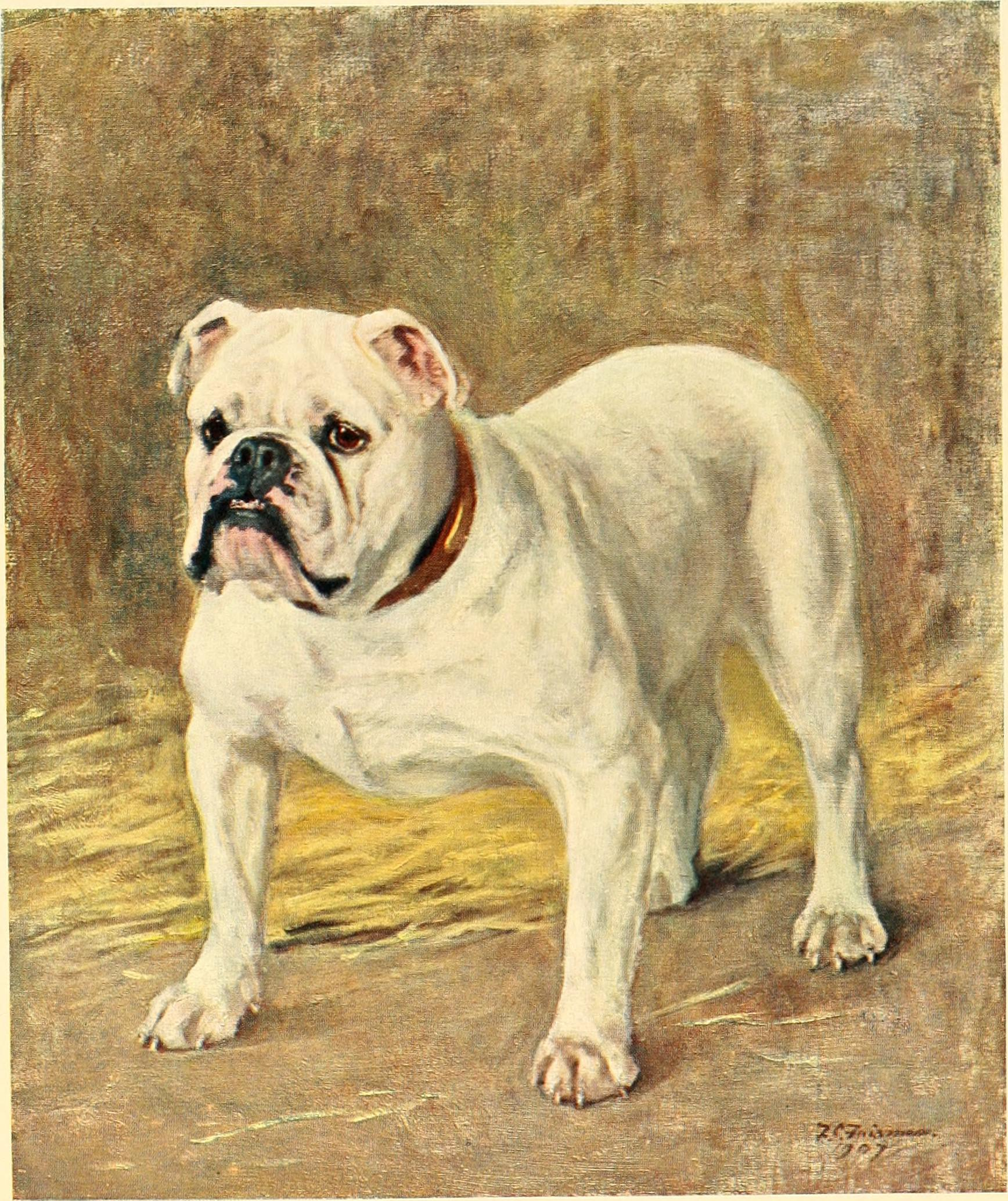
Silent Duchess, from Leighton (1911)

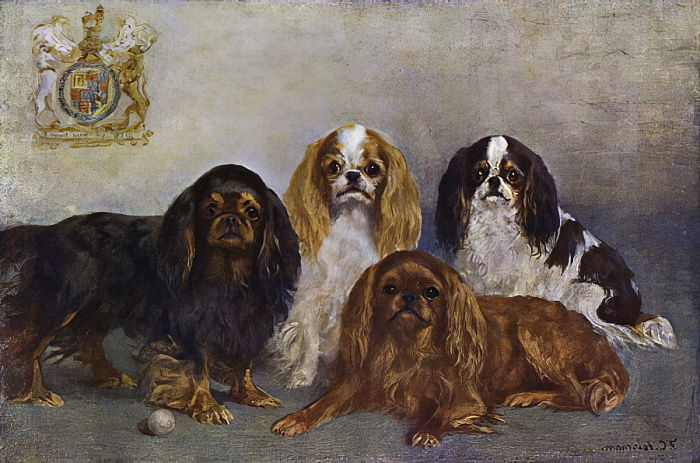
King Charles Spaniels, from Leighton (1907)

=== Exhibitions ===
Fairman's works were exhibited in London from 1865 onwards.

- Dudley Gallery Art Society, Egyptian Hall: One watercolour. "F.C. Fairman ... among those who send promising or attractive sketches". (Illustrated London News, 1886).
- Dudley Gallery Art Society, Egyptian Hall: Bob, the first prize old English Sheepdog, also portraits, flower-study and animal portraits, all watercolours (1889).
- Dudley Gallery: various works (1890).
- Society of Lady Artists: Various watercolours of fruit and flowers (1892).
- Dudley Gallery Art Society, Egyptian Hall: A couple of owls and dead mouse, watercolour, (1890). "Decided merit".
- Art exhibition at Victoria Hall, Bracknell: Three in a tub, oil (1894).
- Society of British Artists: Contemplating the fate of China and Three Japanese spaniels and a broken China doll (1896).
- Society of Lady Artists: Various canine portraits, including Miss Bowyer Smythe's Scotch dogs and Champion dachshund Pterodactyl (1896). Miss Bowyer Smythe's Scotch dogs is a very sympathetic study of canine characteristics".
- Clifford's, Bond Street, London: An exhibition, The Dog Show on Paper and Canvas, dedicated to Fairman's dog portraits (1897).
- Royal Academy Summer Exhibition: The platter clean: portraits of three Japanese dogs, 448, oil (1897).
- Society of Lady Artists: Gilda and Mitzu, watercolour (1898).
- Graves Galleries, Pall Mall, London: Various canine portraits, including United we stand, watercolour (1898).
- Royal Academy Summer Exhibition: Three for the red, 632, oil (1899).
- Society of Women Artists: Various works, including "many of her faithfully-depicted dogs" (1899).
- Grafton Galleries, Women's international Art Club: Four canine portraits, including Tina (1901).
- Dudley Gallery Art Society, Water Colour Society: Two "clever dog studies" (1901).
- No.10 Ryder Street, St James's, London: Various dog portraits in an exhibition devoted to dogs (1901). "Miss F.C. Fairman, both in oil and watercolour, is celebrated for her proficiency in portraying well-known figures in the canine world".
- Mendoza Galleries, St James's, London: Various watercolours, "excellent work" (1903).
- Society of Women Artists: Smooth Chow Yen How, watercolour (1902). "An aptitude for animal painting ... Miss F.C. Fairman's portraits of dogs".
- Society of Women artists: "The best things are Miss F.C. Fairman's large painting of a Newfoundland dog ..." (1903).
- Society of Women Artists: Various works (1904). Fairman was described as "popular ... portraitist of dogs".
- Dore Gallery, Bond Street, London: A collection titled Dogs of all nations (1904).
- Grafton Gallery: "Three of her speaking-dog portraits" (1904).
- Dore Gallery: Various works (1905).
- Society of Women Artists: "Clever studies of animals" (1905).
- Society of Woman Artists: Various works (1906).
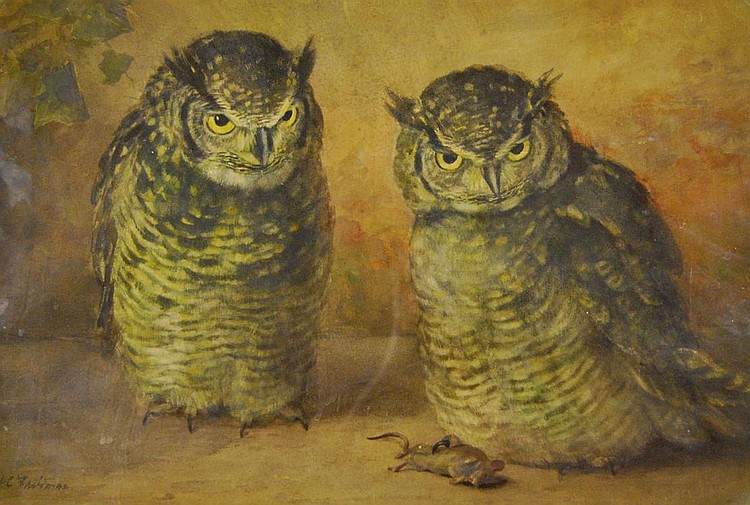
A couple of owls and a dead mouse, 1890

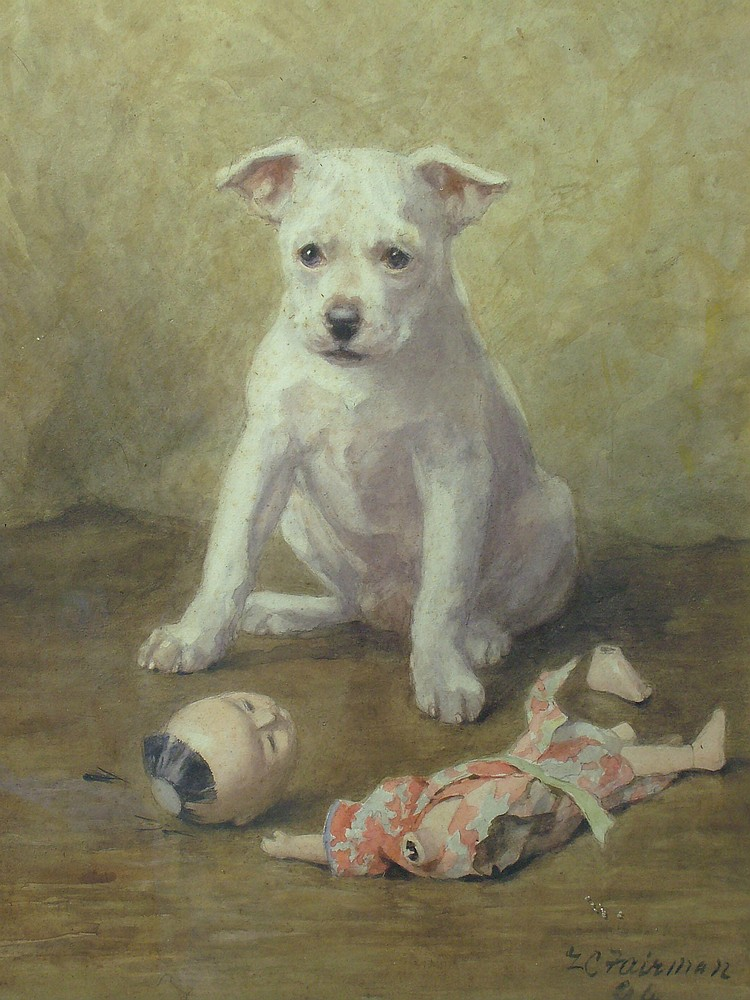
Contemplating the fate of China, 1894

== Collections ==
- Royal Collection Trust: Six canine portraits including Roy (1897), oil on canvas. This picture is displayed at Osborne House. (Note: See also Category:Commissions for the Royal Family by Frances C. Fairman for the other paintings in the Royal Collection)
- National Trust for Places of Historic Interest or Natural Beauty: A longhorn (1864), Gerbils (1872), and Chinchillas (1875).
- Richmond Borough Art Collection: View from Star and Garter, Richmond Hill (undated).
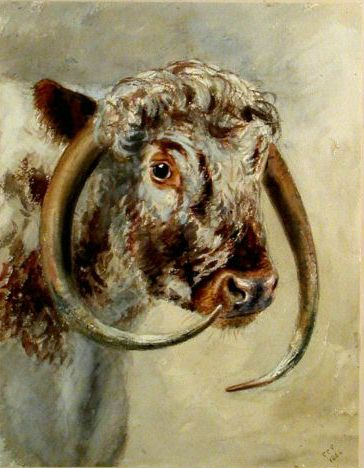
A longhorn, 1864

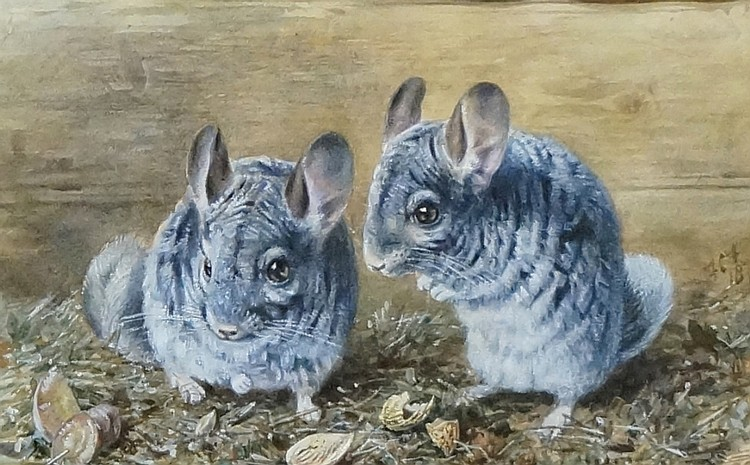
Gerbils, 1872

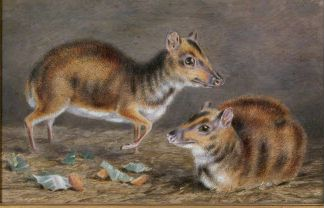
Chinchillas, 1875

== Reviews ==
- "Of the more striking pictures [at Dudley Gallery], above the level of the rest of the exhibition, we may mention ... F.C. Fairman's See what I can do and Le Premier déjeuner – both capital studies of cat and dog life". (Illustrated London News, 1889).
- "A couple of drawings [at Dudley Gallery] by Miss F.C. Fairman seem to me to promise well". (Truth, 1889).
- "The contributions of Miss F.C. Fairman [At Dudley Gallery] are diversified enough in subject, as she exhibits portraits, a flower study and some animals. Bob, the first-prize old English sheepdog is a most excellent study, full of the character of those animals which, as we are aware, sometimes exhibit an intelligence almost human. Another of Miss Fairman's drawings, A wild Florida magnolia, is a careful study of a single blossom and some buds of the beautiful plant". (The Queen, 1889).
- "Miss F.C. Fairman, Sunninghill, can depict dogs ... with exceeding power and fidelity, as was shown in her large oil painting Three in a tub, but we were a trifle doubtful about the breed of the young hound pups which were painted with such skill: are they rough beagles, or Bassets? the faces appeared a trifle snipy for either breed". (Reading Mercury, 1894).
- "Capital canine studies, boldly painted and noteworthy for varied expression". (Morning Post, 1896).
- "A most able study in Contemplating the fate of China ... The artist has here introduced a comic element into her very able painting of Mrs Hanlon's Japanese spaniels. The animals are apparently regarding with surprise a Chinese doll prostrate on the table. The dogs are full of character and painted in masterly fashion". (The Queen, 1896). (Note: The painting, Contemplating the fate of China, has a political slant, containing a reference to the Japanese invasion of Taiwan (1895).)
- "Miss Fairman, who has recently been honoured with commissions from Her Majesty the Queen and the Princess of Wales, draws canine portraits so faithfully that in doggy circles she has earned the sobriquet of the Lady Landseer". (Westminster Gazette, 1897).

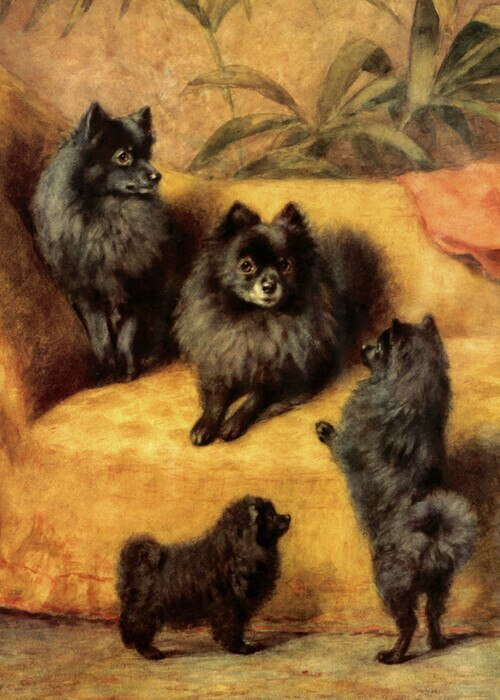
Four generations, 1897

- "The dog show on paper and canvas is an excellent title for the collection of dog portraits by Miss F.C. Fairman, now to be seen in Clifford's Gallery in the Haymarket, for here are gathered together some seventy dogs of note, many of them being champions, and several pets belonging to the Royal Family, amongst them being the well-known Little Billee, belonging to the Princess of Wales, the same dear little black and white face appearing in a group entitled, Punchie, Facey and Little Billee. Venus is lent by the Prince of Wales, and some two or three others are pets of Her Majesty. Four generations consists of a very prettily arranged picture of Mrs Thomas's Black Poms, this is an excellent portrait group, very natural and full of life; the most expressive face of Beira a black pug owned by Mrs Fifleld is remarkably well rendered, so too is a group of little Jap or Chinese dogs which are gravely considering a comical Japanese doll lying uncomfortably on its face with its wooden arms outstretched, this is quaintly called Discussing the fate of China. Number six is a particularly well painted black-headed schipperke answering to the name of Phisto, and is lent by Mrs Krehl. Miss Fairman has succeeded remarkably well so far as portraiture is concerned, imparting many points of likeness and vitality, but there is still something to be desired with regard to her technique of skin texture, also the majority of the heads are highly preferable to the complete figures, as these occasionally have something lacking in the matter of proportion". (Gentlewoman, 1897).
- "Her skill in realising the character of her subjects is quite exceptional. She shows a rare degree of appreciation of the peculiar attributes of the various breeds of dogs with which she has had to deal, and is particularly successful in rendering varieties and subtleties of texture. Her best work is in water-colour; her oil paintings hardly do justice to her unquestionable capacity, and lack something of reality and expressiveness. The success of the exhibition has already been remarkable; among the purchasers of her productions are the Queen, the Prince and Princess of Wales, and various other members of the Royal Family, and commissions for the portraits of several of the royal pets have immediately followed". (Globe, 1897).
- "Miss F.C. Fairman ... is already favourably known for some excellent little object-sketches done in Florida and Brazil. The artist has a most acute perception of those moments when dogs look as if they possessed an intelligence at present unknown to us. Many of the dogs painted are owned by folk of high degree from royalty down, and though their pictures may not commend themselves to those who like muscle as apart from points, Miss Fairman is to be congratulated for much creditable and clever work". (Reynolds's Newspaper, 1897).
- "The canine portraits by Miss F.C. Fairman are excellent, the water colour of Smooth Chow Yen How, with a silky black texture, being particularly good". (Gentlewoman, 1902).
