= Baron Teynham =

Title in the Peerage of England

Barony of Teynham
- Arms of Roper: Per fesse azure and or, a pale counterchanged, and three stags’ heads erased of the second.
- Creation date: 1616
- Created by: James VI and I
- Peerage: Peerage of England
- First holder: Sir John Roper
- Present holder: David Roper-Curzon, 21st Baron Teynham
- Heir apparent: Henry Christopher John Ingham Alexis Roper-Curzon
- Remainder to: the 1st Baron's heirs male of the body lawfully begotten
- Seat: Pylewell Park
- Motto: SPES MEA IN DEO (My hope is in God)

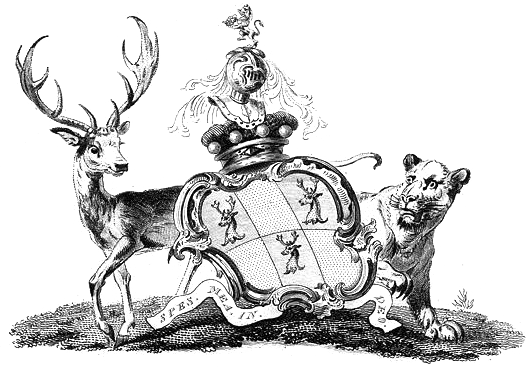
Heraldic achievement of Roper, Baron Teynham

Baron Teynham, of Teynham in the County of Kent, is a title in the Peerage of England. It was created in 1616 for Sir John Roper. The family seat is Pylewell Park, near Lymington, Hampshire.

In 1788, the 14th Baron Teynham inherited his distant cousin’s John Barnewall Curzon’s wealth and estate at Water Perry, Northamptonshire. Thus he adopted, by royal licence, the additional surname of Curzon despite not being related by blood to any Curzons. His descendants, such as John Roper-Curzon, the 21st and present Baron still go by their full surname of 'Roper-Curzon'.

== History ==
The Roper family is an English aristocratic family that can be traced back to 1066 following the Norman Conquest by residing in Derbyshire. Members of the family have held three hereditary titles: Viscount Baltinglass, Baron Dacre, and Baron Teynham.

Upon the accession of James I, John Roper was the first of the gentry in his county to proclaim the new king, for which service he was knighted in 1616 (although according to other sources he may have already been knighted by Queen Elizabeth in 1587) and raised to the peerage as Lord Teynham on the same day. His contribution of £10,000 to the new king's coffers may also have played a role in his elevation to the nobility. Ned Wymarke joked that he was "Baron of Ten M", 10 thousand pound. According to Gardiner, however, Roper's ennoblement was not any sort of sign of gratitude from the king; rather, it was granted (after the payment of £10,000) as a way to induce Roper to relinquish an office he held in the King's Bench. King James hoped to grant the office to his grasping favourite, George Villiers, 1st Duke of Buckingham, and viewed Roper as an obstacle to the plan.

The first Baron's great-great-grandson, the fifth Baron, served as Lord Lieutenant of Kent. The latter's third son, the eighth Baron, married, as his second wife, Anne Barrett-Lennard, 16th Baroness Dacre. His eldest son from this marriage, Charles Roper, was the father of Trevor Charles Roper, 18th Baron Dacre, and Gertrude Trevor Roper, 19th Baroness Dacre (see the Baron Dacre for more information). His youngest son from this marriage, Reverend Richard Henry Roper, was the great-great-great-grandfather of the historian Hugh Trevor-Roper, Baron Dacre of Glanton.

The eighth Baron was succeeded by his eldest son from his first marriage to Catherine Smythe, the ninth Baron. He died unmarried and was succeeded by his younger brother, the tenth Baron. The latter's grandson, the fourteenth Baron, assumed in 1788 by Royal licence the surname of Curzon in lieu of his patronymic but in 1813 he resumed by Royal licence his original surname of Roper in addition to that of Curzon. His great-great-grandson, the nineteenth Baron, served as Deputy Chairman of Committees in the House of Lords from 1946 to 1959. As of 2021 the title is held by the twenty-first Baron, who succeeded in that year.

== Barons Teynham (1616) ==
- John Roper, 1st Baron Teynham (c. 1534 – 1618)
- Christopher Roper, 2nd Baron Teynham (1561–1622)
- John Roper, 3rd Baron Teynham (c. 1591 – 1628)
- Christopher Roper, 4th Baron Teynham (1621–1673)
- Christopher Roper, 5th Baron Teynham (died 1689)
- John Roper, 6th Baron Teynham (died 1697)
- Christopher Roper, 7th Baron Teynham (died 1699)
- Henry Roper, 8th Baron Teynham (c. 1676 – 1723)
- Philip Roper, 9th Baron Teynham (1707–1727)
- Henry Roper, 10th Baron Teynham (c. 1708 – 1781)
- Henry Roper, 11th Baron Teynham (1734–1786)
- Henry Roper, 12th Baron Teynham (1764–1800)
- John Roper, 13th Baron Teynham (1767–1824)
- Henry Francis Roper-Curzon, 14th Baron Teynham (1767–1842)
- Henry Roper-Curzon, 15th Baron Teynham (1789–1842)
- George Henry Roper-Curzon, 16th Baron Teynham (1798–1889)
- Henry George Roper-Curzon, 17th Baron Teynham (1822–1892)
- Henry John Philip Sidney Roper-Curzon, 18th Baron Teynham (1867–1936)
- Christopher John Henry Roper-Curzon, 19th Baron Teynham (1896–1972)
- John Christopher Ingham Roper-Curzon, 20th Baron Teynham (1928–2021)
- David John Henry Ingham Roper-Curzon, 21st Baron Teynham (b. 1965)

The heir apparent is the present holder’s son, Henry Christopher John Ingham Alexis Roper-Curzon (b. 1986)

== See also ==
- Baron Dacre
- Viscount Baltinglass
