= John Roper, 1st Baron Teynham =

British aristocrat

- Arms of Roper: Per fesse azure and or, a pale counter-changed and three buck's heads erased of the second
- Died: 1618
- Spouses: Elizabeth Parke; Elizabeth Dyon
- Issue: Christopher Roper; Elizabeth Roper; Jane (or Mary) Roper
- Father: Christopher Roper
- Mother: Elizabeth Blore

John Roper (died 1618) was an English peer, created Baron Teynham in 1616.

== Early life ==
John Roper was the eldest son of Christopher Roper, Esq. of Lynsted, Kent, and his wife Elizabeth Blore. The Ropers (whose original surname had been Musard) were an old Kentish family with origins in Derbyshire. Bearing strong Catholic connections, his uncle's wife, Margaret Roper, was the daughter of Sir Thomas More.

== Later life and peerage ==
Roper succeeded to his father's manor of Badmangore on the latter's death. In 1599, he had a new house, Lynsted Lodge, built at Lynsted. Upon the accession of James I, Roper was the first of the gentry in his county to proclaim the new king, for which service he was knighted in 1616 (although according to other sources he may have already been knighted by Queen Elizabeth in 1587) and raised to the peerage as Lord Teynham on the same day.

His contribution of £10,000 to the new king's coffers may also have played a role in his elevation to the nobility. Ned Wymarke joked that he was "Baron of Ten M", 10 thousand pound. According to Gardiner, however, Roper's ennoblement was not any sort of sign of gratitude from the king; rather, it was granted (after the payment of £10,000) as a way to induce Roper to relinquish an office he held in the King's Bench. King James hoped to grant the office to his grasping favourite, George Villiers, 1st Duke of Buckingham, and viewed Roper as an obstacle to the plan.

== Marriage and family ==
He firstly married Elizabeth Parke, daughter of Richard Parke, Esq. of Malmaine. They had three children, including;

- Christopher, who would succeed to the barony.
- Elizabeth, who married George Vaux, son of William Vaux, 3rd Baron Vaux of Harrowden, and was the mother of the 4th Baron Vaux
- Jane (or Mary), who married Sir Robert Lovell of Martin Abbey, and was questioned on suspicion of involvement in the Gunpowder Plot. After July 1606, she lived as a widow in Brussels, and her house was robbed during religious processions at Easter 1610.

John Roper's first wife Elizabeth died in 1567. Roper married a second time to Elizabeth Dyon some time between 24 September 1583 (when her first husband died) and 4 April 1584. His second wife also predeceased him, dying prior to 22 September 1593, they had no children.

== Death ==
John Roper died in 1618, and was succeeded in his title by his son Christopher. He was buried in the south chancel of the church at Lynsted Lodge.

Peerage of England
New creation	Baron Teynham; 1616–1618	Succeeded by Christopher Roper
