= House of Lords Yacht Club =

English yacht club

- Burgee

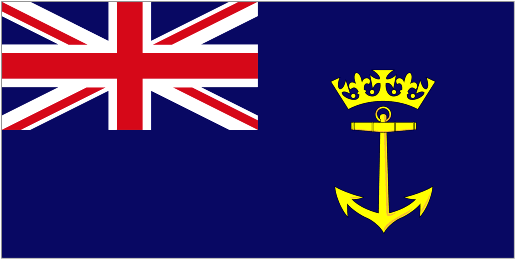
- Ensign
- Founded: 1949; 77 years ago

The House of Lords Yacht Club is a yachting association for members of the House of Lords and some others connected with it, formed in 1949.

== History ==
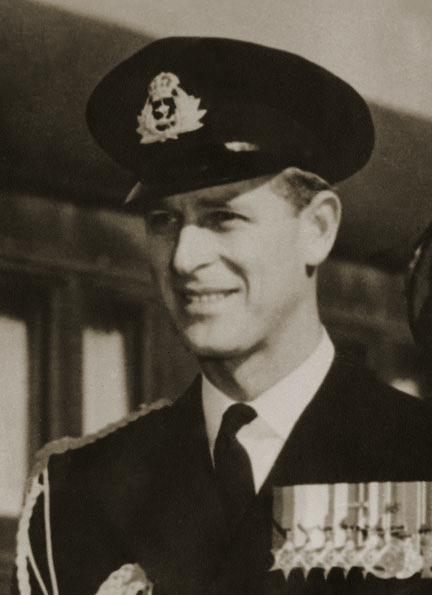
Prince Philip, Duke of Edinburgh

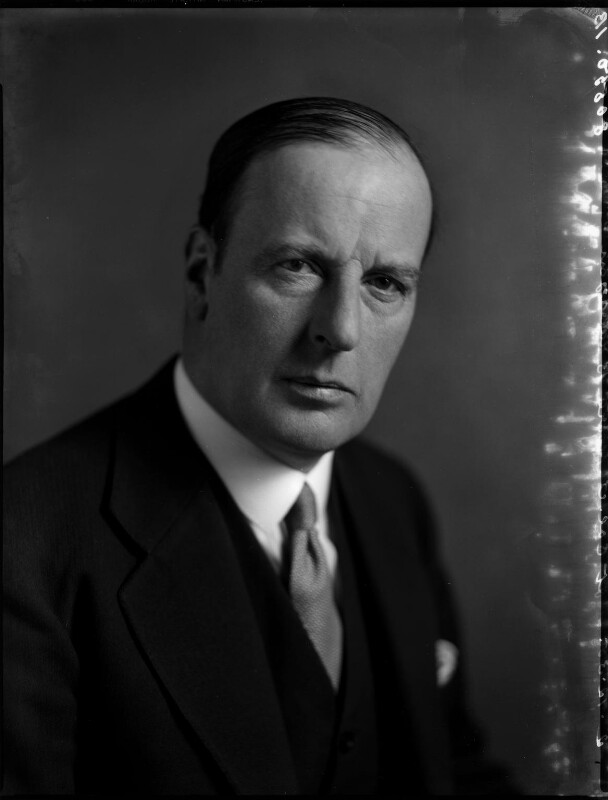
Lord Brabazon

The club was formed at a meeting at the House of Lords in 1949, when it was agreed that membership was open to peers, the eldest sons of peers, officers of the House of Lords, and the staff of the Lord Chancellor. John Moore-Brabazon, 1st Baron Brabazon of Tara, was elected as the first commodore and Christopher Roper-Curzon, 19th Baron Teynham, as vice-commodore.

In June 1949, the Secretary to the Lord Great Chamberlain wrote to the Admiralty on behalf of the club, asking the Lords of the Admiralty to agree to a Club flag based on the White Ensign, defaced with a portcullis, and a white burgee with a red Palace of Westminster portcullis and crown. However, since 1842 the use of the White Ensign by a yacht club had only been permitted to the Royal Yacht Squadron, and the Admiralty would not agree to it. An agreement was finally reached in June 1950 with the base for the club flag being the Blue Ensign, defaced with a plain gold vertical anchor surmounted by a gold royal coronet, and its burgee white with a red portcullis and coronet.

In April 1950, the Secretary of the Club reported that it had 48 members, with 26 yachts.

In 1952, Prince Philip, Duke of Edinburgh, received the title of "Admiral of the House of Lords Yacht Club" and was subsequently Commodore from 1961 to 1968. In 2020, he continued to hold the title of Admiral of the club.

Papers relating to the club's committee and annual meetings, its accounts, and its social events between 1951 and 1983 are held in the Parliamentary Archives.

== Notable members ==
- Lord Brabazon, commodore, 1949
- Lord Teynham, vice-commodore, 1949
- Prince Philip, Duke of Edinburgh, Admiral of the club from 1952 until his death in 2021, and also Commodore 1961–1968
- Peter Hope, 4th Baron Rankeillour, Rear Commodore, 1992
- Malcolm Mitchell-Thomson, 3rd Baron Selsdon, Honorary Treasurer and Honorary Secretary, 2004
- Ambrose Greenway, 4th Baron Greenway, Commodore, 2008
- Edward Douglas-Scott-Montagu, 3rd Baron Montagu of Beaulieu, Vice-Commodore, 2007
- Victor Hervey, 6th Marquess of Bristol
- Ian Macpherson, 3rd Baron Strathcarron, Commodore, 2023
