= Henry Roper-Curzon, 18th Baron Teynham =

(1867–1936), Major

Henry Roper-Curzon, 18th Baron of Teynham
- Born: Henry John Philip Sidney Roper-Curzon; 27 May 1867; London, England
- Died: 19 December 1936 (aged 69)
- Occupation: Baron of Teynham
- Spouse: Mabel Wilkinson (m. 1895)
- Children: Christopher and Ralph

Henry John Philip Sidney Roper-Curzon, 18th Baron of Teynham (1867–1936) was an English soldier and businessman. He studied at Eton College, and then at the Royal Military College, Sandhurst.

== History ==
Henry Roper-Curzon was born on the 27 May 1867 and died in 1936. He was the son of Henry George Roper-Curzon, 17th Baron Teynham, by his marriage to Harriet Anne Lovell Heathcote, a daughter of the Rev. Thomas Heathcote, of Shaw Hill House, Wiltshire.

Roper-Curzon inherited his peerage in 1892 on the death of his father. He was commissioned into the Royal East Kent Yeomanry as a second lieutenant on 14 March 1900. He later transferred to The Buffs (Royal East Kent Regiment), seeing active service overseas in the First World War, rising to the rank of Major. He was appointed as a Chevalier of the French Legion of Honour and later served as a Justice of the Peace and a Deputy Lieutenant for Kent, where he lived at Lynsted Lodge, near Sittingbourne.

On 26 June 1895 Lord Teynham married Mabel Wilkinson, daughter of the late Colonel Henry Green Wilkinson (1822–1894), of Pannington Hall, and they had two sons, Christopher John Henry Roper-Curzon, later the 19th Baron Teynham (1896–1972) and Ralph Henry Roper-Curzon (born 1899).

In 1927 Lord Teynham also had an address at 8, Hertford Street, Mayfair, W1, and he was chairman of Glebofi Grosny Petroleum Company Ltd, Kuranti Syndicate Ltd, Peacehaven Estates Ltd, and Peacehaven Water Company Ltd, and a director of the Fanti Consolidated Investment Company Ltd.

Lord Teynham died in 1936 and was succeeded by his elder son, Christopher Roper-Curzon, a Royal Navy officer who had married Elspeth Whitaker in 1927.

== Family estates ==
- Pylewell Park

== See also ==
- Baron Teynham

== Notes ==
Peerage of England
Preceded by Henry George Roper-Curzon	Baron Teynham; 1892–1936	Succeeded by Christopher John Henry Roper-Curzon
