= Christopher Roper, 2nd Baron Teynham =

English nobleman of the 17th century

Christopher Roper, 2nd Baron of Teynham
- Arms of Roper: Per fesse azure and or, a pale counter-changed and three buck's heads erased of the second
- Born: Dec. 1561; Lynsted, Kent, England
- Died: 16 April 1622 (aged 60); Lynsted, Kent, England
- Noble family: Roper
- Father: John Roper
- Mother: Lady Elizabeth Parke

Christopher Roper, 2nd Baron Teynham (b. Dec. 1561 d. 16 Apr. 1622) was an English peer. He became the second Baron Teynham in 1618, after the death of his father, John Roper, 1st Baron Teynham.

Christopher was the eldest son of John Roper, of Lynsted, Kent, and his wife Elizabeth Parke. The Ropers (whose original surname had been Musard) were an old Kentish family with strong Catholic connections.

Peerage of England
Preceded by John Roper	Baron Teynham; 1618–1622	Succeeded by John Roper
