= Lynsted =

Village in Kent, England

Coordinates: 51.313°N 0.7859°E

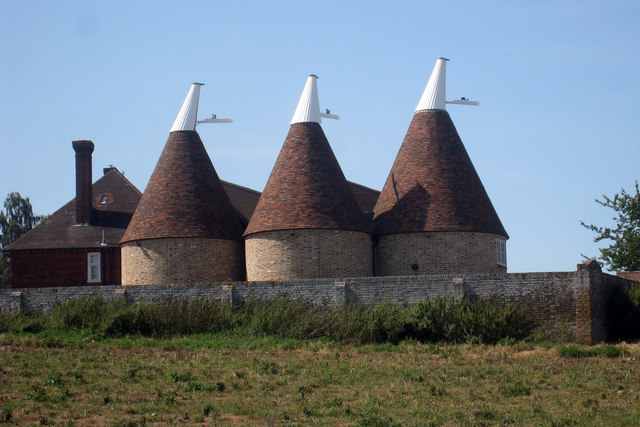
- Scuttington Manor Oast House

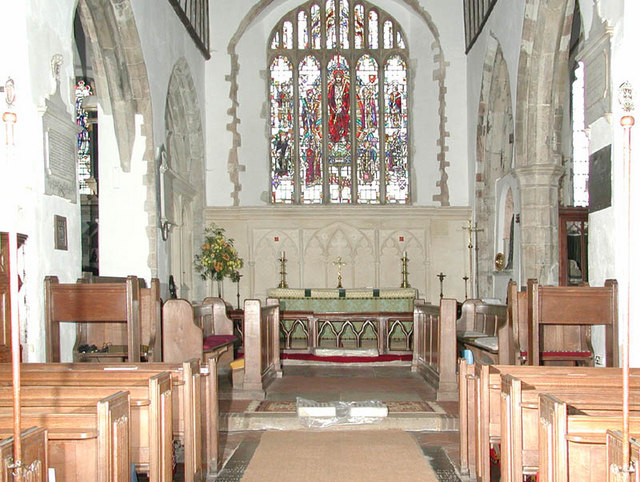
- inside church of St Peter and St Paul, Lynsted

- Location within Kent
- Population: 1,600 (2011 Census)
- OS grid reference: TQ 943608
- Civil parish: Lynsted with Kingsdown
- District: Swale
- Shire county: Kent
- Region: South East
- Country: England
- Sovereign state: United Kingdom
- Post town: Sittingbourne
- Postcode district: ME9
- Dialling code: 01795
- Police: Kent
- Fire: Kent
- Ambulance: South East Coast
- UK Parliament: Faversham and Mid Kent

Lynsted is a village in Lynsted with Kingsdown civil parish in the Swale borough of Kent, England. The village is situated south of the A2 road between Faversham and Sittingbourne and the nearest M2 junction is Faversham three miles east. Lynsted is in many respects an archetypal old English village with church, churchyard with an ancient yew, pub (the Black Lion) and a duck pond. The village is locally referred to as Lovely, Lovely Lynsted and various songs have been written about it.

== Geography ==
The parish's southern part is on the north slope of the North Downs; Bluetown, Kingsdown is at 104 m above mean sea level and Erriottwood at 67 m. Its extent stretches from, in the north, the Roman road Watling Street, later named Greenstreet and now named London Road, where the hamlets south of it are Cellarhill or Cellar Hill and Claxfield (that borders across the road Teynham) to, in the south, Erriottwood. Bogle in the north-centre and Tickham in the east are the two other hamlets, within 1/4 mile of the centre. The land drains well with chalks of the North Downs.

== History ==
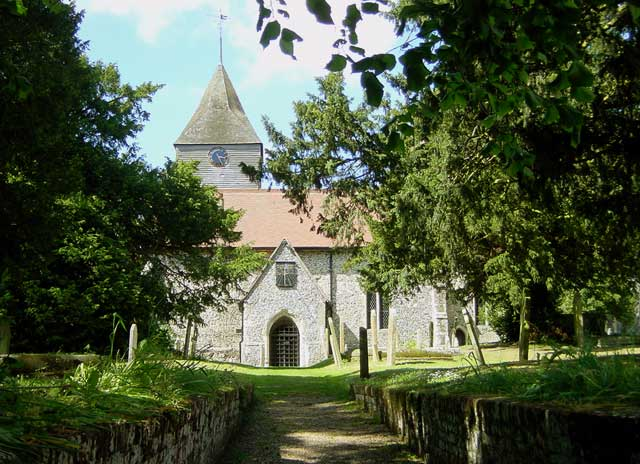
Church of Saints Peter and Paul

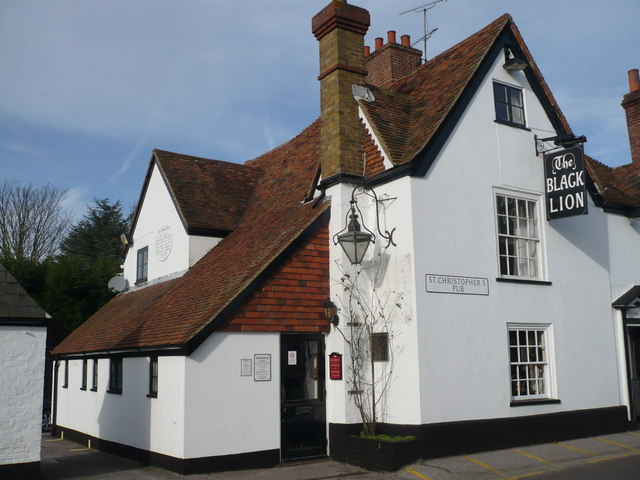
The Black Lion pub

Lyndsted is not featured in the Domesday Book of 1086; the closest featured location is Milton Regis to the north-west.

There is a church to St Peter and St Paul with the highest, grade I, architectural listing status. It is a 14th-century broach-spired church, with 13th-century features and its chancel is 16th century.

The monuments include the south Roper chapel to Sir John Roper, 1st Baron Teynham, d.1618, containing a brass chandelier dated 1686. There are monumental brasses to Elizabeth Roper, d.1567, to John Worley, d.1621, with 2 foot figures, and a painted alabaster effigy of a stiff recumbent knight with his lady on a marble sarcophagus, whilst a son and two daughters kneel on a panel to the rear in a coffered niche, with an architectural surround with corinthian capitals, a dentil cornice, obelisks and a cartouche.

There is an effigy of Lord Christopher Roper, d.1622, signed by sculptor Epiphanius Evesham subtitled 'Me fecit', with plaster figures of a reclining and dying knight draped with his ermine cloak, with his kneeling and mourning wife behind him. He lies on a sarcophagus with a central inscription, flanked by carved panels of 2 sons, their backs turned to their hounds and hawks, and 5 daughters and granddaughters.

The north Huggeson chapel contains a memorial to Catherine Drurye (née Finche) d.1601, an alabaster hanging monument with a kneeling couple facing each other, their children behind, with bracketed base; also there are monuments to John Huggeson d.1634; Josiah Huggeson, d.1639; James Huggeson, d.1646 (a recumbent man and wife on bolection-moulded sarcophagus); Rudolph Weckerlin, d.1667; Anne Delaune, d.1719; Martha Huggeson, d.1753; and William Huggeson, d.1774.

From this it can be seen that the Huggeson and Roper families were among the wealthiest landowners from at least the 16th century; they developed their dedicated chapels with artistically acclaimed monuments.

The village centre is a conservation area containing 24 listed buildings.

== Notable people ==
- Mary Lovel was prob. born here as Jane Roper, (1564–1628), founder of Antwerp convent
- Frances C. Fairman (1839–1923), artist.

== Governance ==
Lynsted in elections every four years elects two representatives to Kent County Council who are currently:

Election	Member	ward
2009	Mr Alan Willicombe	Swale Central
2009	Mr Mark Whiting	Swale Central

Lynsted elects two representatives to Swale Borough Council, they are currently:

Election	Member	Ward
2011	Richard Barnicott	Teynham and Lynsted
2011	Lloyd Bowen	Teynham and Lynsted

== See also ==
- Listed buildings in Lynsted with Kingsdown
