= Teynham =

Village in Kent, England

Coordinates: 51.331°N 0.802°E

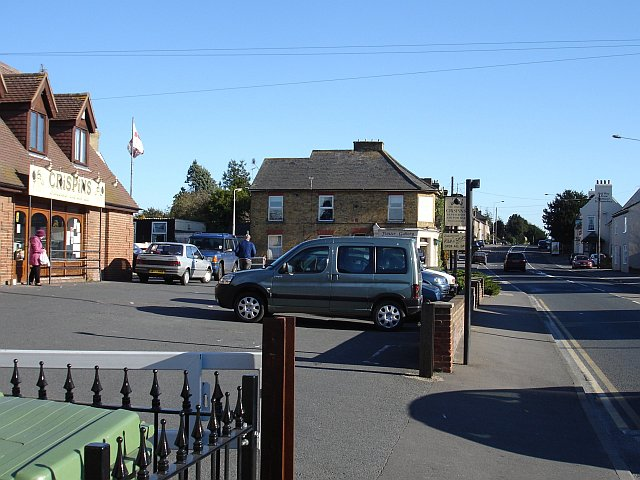
- The A2 London Road, part of the most densely populated area

- Location within Kent
- Population: 2,904 (2001); 2,913 (2011)
- OS grid reference: TQ952628
- Civil parish: Teynham
- District: Swale
- Shire county: Kent
- Region: South East
- Country: England
- Sovereign state: United Kingdom
- Post town: SITTINGBOURNE
- Postcode district: ME9
- Dialling code: 01795
- Police: Kent
- Fire: Kent
- Ambulance: South East Coast
- UK Parliament: Faversham and Mid Kent

Teynham (/ˈtɛnəm/ TEN-əm) is a small village and civil parish in the borough of Swale in Kent, England. The parish lies between the towns of Sittingbourne and Faversham, immediately north of the A2 road, and includes the hamlet of Conyer on an inlet of the Swale, the channel that separates mainland Kent from the Isle of Sheppey. Other hamlets include Deerton Street, Frognal, and Teynham Street.

The village has a railway station, served by Southeastern trains running between London Victoria and Dover.

== Origin of name ==
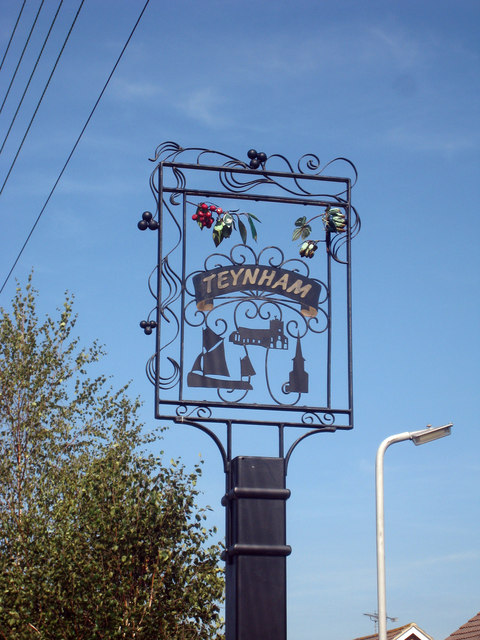
Teynham village sign

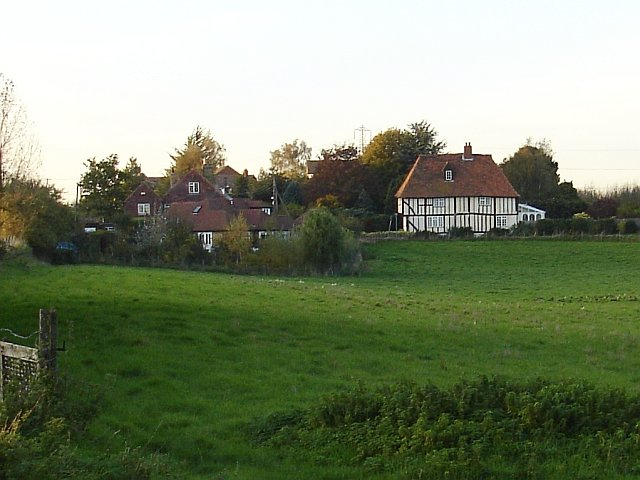
Teynham Street, conservation area surrounded by farmland

Charters of 798 to 801 and Domesday Monachorum – a series of Domesday-related texts kept at Canterbury Cathedral – mention it as Teneham, Taenham, Tenaham and Tenham. In the Domesday Book of 1086 the name occurs as "Therham" (probably a clerical error).

The historian JK Wallenberg (in 1931) suggests an Anglo-Saxon root, tynan, to enclose, followed by the Anglo-Saxon word "Hamm", a land drained by dykes. The philologist Eilert Ekwall (in 1936) suggested an early owner named Teona, whose name is found in Teonanhyll in Berkshire.

In 1590, William Lambarde wrote his book Perambulation of Kent, in which Tenham is called the towne of ten houses. He also notes that in 1533, 105 acres of good ground in 'Brennet' (a former name of Tenham) were divided in ten parcels of land to grow fruit for King Henry.

J Harris, in his History of Kent (1719) calls it the "place of ten houses" (hams) but there must have been hundreds of places with 10 houses in Anglo-Saxon times.

It is also possibly "homestead of a man called Tena" or "homestead near the stream called Tene". Several other etymologies have been suggested.

The "y" in "Teynham" was apparently added by the Roper family, who have been Barons of Teynham from 1616.

== Geography ==
Teynham is an agricultural parish situated three miles east of Sittingbourne. The southern part of the parish is mainly devoted to agriculture, the principal crops being corn and hops with the produce of some famous orchards. Near the Swale is a large tract of land known as the Teynham Levels. This is devoted solely to the raising of sheep and cattle. At one time these marshes were not properly drained, and malaria was prevalent within the parish. So many residents got the disease that Teynham became known as an unhealthy place.

The draining of the marshes eradicated this by 1953, which was carried out under the direction of a Commission formed for the purpose (and who had powers to levy a scot). The disease in the UK threatens a return to the Swale marshes, with dry habitats such as vacant pillboxes allowing over-wintering for vector species, however few carriers frequently come to the area and gradually derelict structures are being removed.

== History ==
Teynham lies on Watling Street, in Roman times the main route from Dover to London. At several places along this route, monumental tombs of Roman age have been found, one of which was discovered to the west of Teynham, just north of the junction of the London Road with Claxfield Road. This probably included a sacred enclosure, dating from the mid-first century, around a central building that sheltered a Roman sculpture of the god Triton, half man and half fish, with a ketos sea monster, which was discovered in 2023. Many fragments of local and continental red, white, and green stone types also indicate the original display of the owner's wealth. He may also have been the owner of the villa rustica at Bax Farm some 1400 metres to the north. The sculpture is one of very few tritons in Britain; other and more sophisticated representations are common on the Continent. It appears to have been ritually decapitated and buried in the early to mid fourth-century, possibly associated with the christianization of the Roman Empire.

Early Archbishops resided in Teynham. Coenwulf of Mercia, who reigned 794–819, gave Teynham to Christ Church, Canterbury, and later a palace, which no longer exists, was built here. Archbishop Baldwin of Forde (1184–91), Hubert Walter (1193–1207), Stephen Langton (1207–29), and Raynold (1313–28) all in turn lived at Teynham. Archbishop John de Stratford in 1345, entertained King Edward III at Teynham. The church, St Mary's, in Teynham Street towards Conyer is Grade I listed, by the oldest buildings, Hinkley's Mill, Thatched Cottage, The Old Vicarage, Banks' farmhouse and cottage, Teynham Court and Crown House. The church stained glass windows date two centuries after its building, to the 15th century, restored 1873.

Later King Henry III granted the town the right to hold a market and fair. Richard Harrys (or Harris – in some accounts) who also lived at Teynham, and was a fruiterer to King Henry VIII instructed to plant 105 acres of land with cherries and apples that he had obtained from Flanders, and thus the village is one of the earliest in which the cherry was grown in Kent and England.

By 1848, Teynham had a population of 845 people. It was part of the Hundred of Teynham, in the Upper Division of the Lathe of Scray. Most of the village income was made from cherry growing, with some from hops. Its patron was still the Archdeacon of Canterbury.

== Amenities ==
There are several pubs throughout the parish, some with restaurants and take-aways, there is a substantial primary school with grounds for sports/games and a few shops, and a post office, and has a library on the London Road. The most historic buildings in Teynham are almost all relatively near the Saxon Shore Way, marina and wharf in Conyer and consequently the village and Conyer has some guesthouses.

== Transport ==
The village is accessible off the M2 from the Sittingbourne junction, with the A2 providing short distance motor journeys and an easy cycle route to Sittingbourne and Faversham. The railway station provides services to key destinations as follows (for London Victoria see above):

== See also ==
- Listed buildings in Teynham

== Sources ==
- Wallenberg, J K, Place-Names of Kent, Lundequistska Bokhandein, Uppsala, 1934.
- Ekwall, Eilert, Concise Oxford Dictionary of English Place-Names, fourth edition (Oxford, 1960)
- Harris, J, History of Kent (1719)
