= Christopher Roper-Curzon, 19th Baron Teynham =

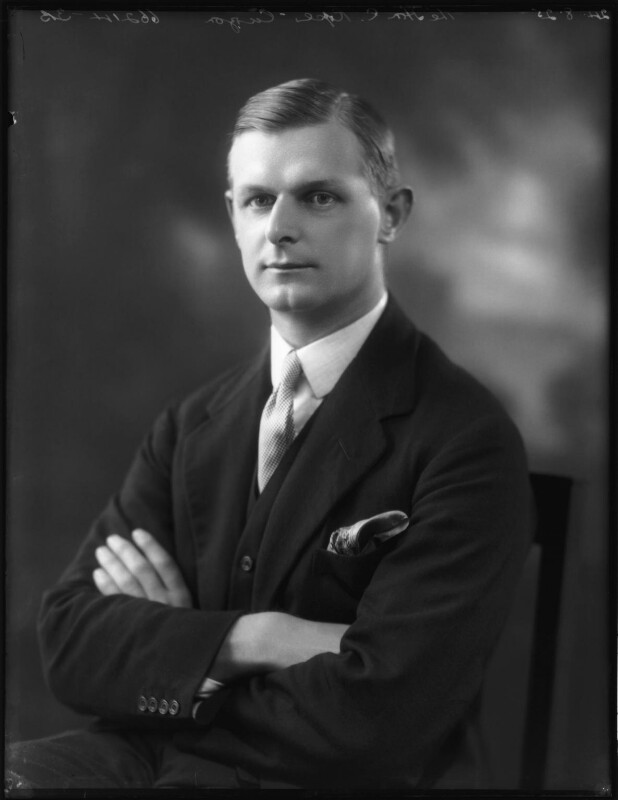
Roper-Curzon in 1925

Christopher John Henry Roper-Curzon, 19th Baron Teynham, DSO, DSC (6 May 1896 – 5 May 1972), was a career officer of the Royal Navy and an English peer, with a seat from 1936 in the House of Lords, where from 1946 to 1959 he was Deputy to the Earl of Drogheda and then to Lord Merthyr as Chairman of Committees.

== Career ==
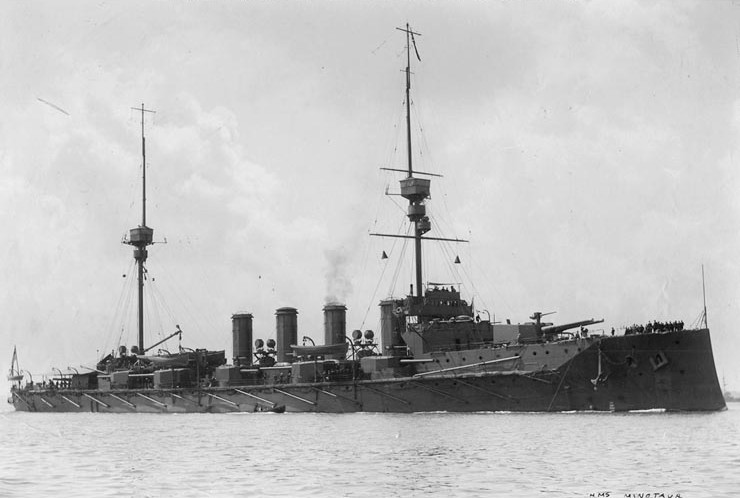
HMS Minotaur

The elder son of Henry Roper-Curzon, 18th Baron Teynham, by his marriage to Mabel Wilkinson, Roper-Curzon was educated at the Royal Naval College, Osborne, and the Royal Naval College, Dartmouth. He saw active service during the First World War, winning both the Distinguished Service Cross and the Distinguished Service Order, serving with the Grand Fleet as Staff Signal Officer on HMS Minotaur. In 1936 he succeeded his father as Lord Teynham. During the Second World War he was Naval Control Service Officer for the Port of London, after which he commanded ships, including HMS Ambitious (F169) on minesweeping duties for the invasion of Europe in 1944. He retired from the navy after the war with the rank of Captain.

In the House of Lords, Teynham served as a Deputy Chairman of Committees from 1946 to 1959, and when the House of Lords Yacht Club was established in 1949, he was its first vice-commodore. Outside parliament he was a Younger Brother of Trinity House, a member of the Council of the Navy League, a Governor of the Royal National Lifeboat Institution, and a director of Grayson Rollo and Clover Docks, Ltd., Coast Lines Ltd, and other companies.

== Personal life ==
On 19 October 1927, Roper-Curzon married Elspeth Grace Whitaker (died 1976), a daughter of William Ingham Whitaker by his marriage to Hilda Guilhermina Dundas. They had two sons, Lord John Christopher Ingham Roper-Curzon, later 20th Baron Teynham (born 1928) and Michael Henry (born 1931), and were divorced in 1955. On 11 February 1955 he married secondly Anne Rita (1923-2007), a daughter of Captain L. C. A. St. J. Curzon-Howe and a granddaughter of Admiral Sir Assheton Curzon-Howe. They had two daughters, Henrietta Margaret Fleur, born in 1955, and Holly Anne-Marie, 1963.

== Modern house ==
In 1788, Henry Francis Roper, the 14th Baron of Teynham inherited his cousin's John Barnewall Curzon's wealth and estate at Water Perry, Northamptonshire when he died. Henry legally added his name to his by Royal Licence and became Henry Francis Roper-Curzon.

== Notes ==
Peerage of England
Preceded by Henry John Philip Sidney Roper-Curzon	Baron Teynham; 1936–1972	Succeeded by John Christopher Ingham Roper-Curzon
