= Pylewell Park =

Coordinates: 50.761°N 1.500°W

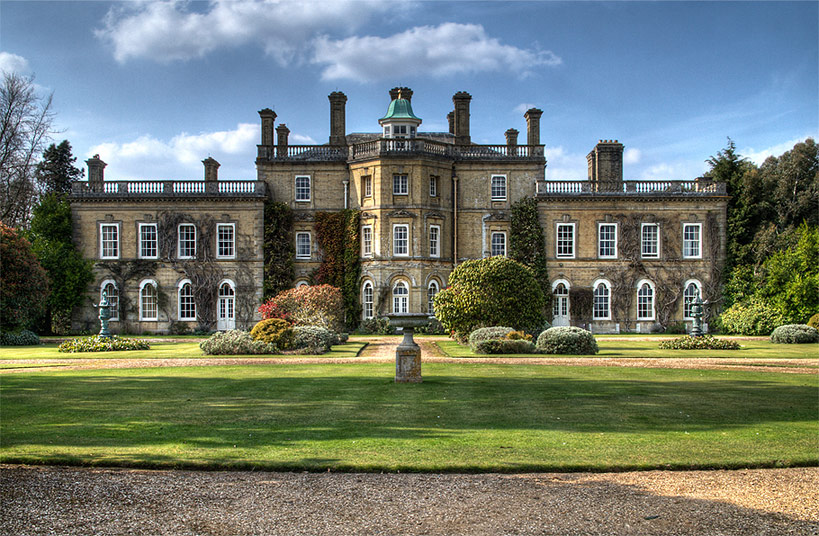
- Pylewell Park in 2016

- Location in Hampshire

Site notes
- Area: Boldre, Hampshire, England

Listed Building – Grade II*
- Official name: Pylewell House
- Designated: 13 May 1987
- Reference no.: 1351015

National Register of Historic Parks and Gardens
- Official name: Pylewell Park
- Type: Grade II*
- Designated: 31 May 1984
- Reference no.: 1000169

Pylewell Park is a country house and park near Lymington in Hampshire. The house is listed at grade II*.

== History ==
A settlement on the site of Baddesley Manor, to the North of the current house, is mentioned in the Domesday Book. Sir Richard Worsley lived in Pylewell Ground in 1609. During the 17th century, Pylewell estate was fortified to Jacobean Lodge.

From 1787 to 1801 Thomas Robbins bought the park and removed most of the formal gardens elements and introduced ornamental walks and informal schemes of parkland. Thomas Weld acquired the estate in 1801 for his third son, Joseph, as a wedding gift. Joseph, aged 25 years, actively dealt with all affairs of the estate up to 1828. He made extensive enhancements to the gardens and farms such as North Park improvements in 1818. Additionally, in 1822 the South Lake was constructed. More improvements continued including the avenue of southern Solent in additional to lay grounds in the formal garden and this occurred in the early eighteen century. By 1854, William Peers of Williams's Freeman started improving Weld's construction as well as the Pylewell grounds. A circular parterre was included in the house of the southeast as more land was bought in the school village of Baddesley.

William Ingham Whitaker acquired the Pylewell estate in 1874. As soon as he acquired the estate, he added a new lodge and drive among other important changes to the house. After his death in 1893 his son William Ingham Whitaker, succeeded him and made more significant alterations. In 1903 he married and travelled to Japan. Accordingly, he developed the pleasure grounds with Australasian and Asian plant collections including bridges and a new lily pond. The East and West wings of the house, which had been added in the early 20th century, were demolished in 1951.

The garden is separately listed at Grade II* in the Register of Historic Parks and Gardens of Special Historic Interest in England.

== Ownership ==
Pylewell Park is currently owned by a trust.
